= List of awards and nominations received by Ciara =

Ciara awards and nominations
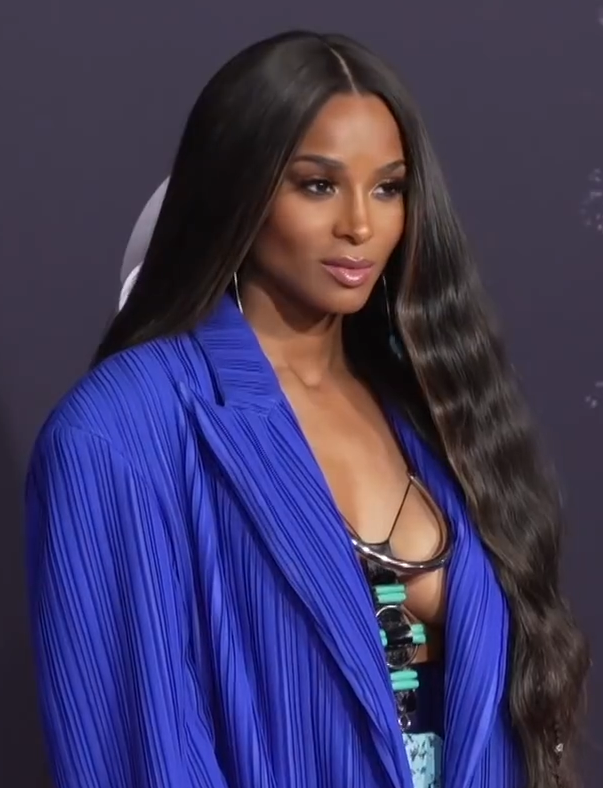
- Ciara at the American Music Awards
Awards and nominations
Award	Wins	Nominations
BET Awards	2	14
Billboard Music Awards	0	4
Critics' Choice Movie Awards	0	1
Grammy Awards	1	5
MTV VMAS	2	9
NAACP Image Awards	2	3
SAG Awards	0	1
Soul Train Music Awards	8	15
Teen Choice Awards	2	10

Totals (Note: Certain award groups do not simply award one winner. They acknowledge several different recipients, have runners-up, and have third place. Since this is a specific recognition and is different from losing an award, runner-up mentions are considered wins in this award tally. For simplification and to avoid errors, each award in this list has been presumed to have had a prior nomination.)
- Wins: 51
- Nominations: 133

This is a list of awards and nominations received by American singer-songwriter and actress Ciara.

Active in the music field since the early 2000s, she has published seven studio albums as well as multiple hit singles and collaborations. Ciara has won seven ASCAP Pop Music Awards and nine ASCAP Rhythm & Soul Music Awards. She was also honored with several non-competitive awards. In 2021, she received the Soul of Justice Award from Soul Train for her humanitarian and social-justice works. The Accessories Council Excellence Awards gave her the Style Icon Award for her contributions to the fashion industry.

Her first album Goodies, released in 2004, garnered her several accolades thanks to three of its singles – "1, 2 Step", "Goodies", and "Oh". The song "1, 2 Step" featuring American rapper Missy Elliott won the BET Award for Best Collaboration and the Teen Choice Awards for Best R&B/Hip-Hop Track. At the 47th Annual Grammy Awards, Ciara was nominated for Best New Artist while "1, 2 Step" was nominated for Best Rap/Sung Collaboration.

Her 2005 collaboration "Lose Control" with Missy Elliott and Fatman Scoop, taken from Elliott's sixth studio album The Cookbook, received three Grammy Award nominations, winning for Best Short Form Music Video. The song's music video also won two MTV Video Music Awards. The same year, Ciara won three Soul Train Lady of Soul Awards.

In the 2010s, Ciara received three Best Dance Performance awards from Soul Train for the songs "Ride" (2010), "Body Party" (2013) and "Level Up" (2019). In 2023, she collaborated with Chris Brown on "How We Roll", winning her first NAACP Image Award for Outstanding Duo or Group (Traditional) at the 55th ceremony.

In 2023 Ciara starred on Blitz the Ambassador's film The Color Purple, receiving a cast nomination at both the Screen Actors Guild Awards and Critics' Choice Movie Awards, while winning an AAFCA Awards, an NAACP Image Award, and a special award at the Celebration of Cinema and Television.

== AAFCA Awards ==
Year	Nominee / work	Award	Result
2024	The Color Purple	Best Ensemble	Won

== ACE Awards ==
Year	Nominee / work	Award	Result
2019	Ciara	Style Icon Award	Won
2023	House of LR&C	Sustainability	Won

== American Music Awards ==
The American Music Awards is an annual awards ceremony created by Dick Clark in 1973. Ciara has received two nominations.

Year	Nominee / work	Award	Result
2005	Ciara	Favorite Soul/R&B Female Artist	Nominated
2013	Ciara	Favorite Soul/R&B Female Artist	Nominated

== ASCAP Pop Music Awards ==
The ASCAP Pop Music Awards is an annual awards ceremony hosted by the American Society of Composers, Authors and Publishers. Ciara has received three awards from three nominations.

Year	Nominee / work	Award	Result
2005	"Goodies"	Most Performed Songs	Won
2006	"Goodies"	Most Performed Songs	Won
2006	"1, 2 Step"	Most Performed Songs	Won
2006	"Oh"	Most Performed Songs	Won
2007	"Like You"	Most Performed Songs	Won
2007	"So What"	Most Performed Songs	Won

== ASCAP Rhythm & Soul Music Awards ==
Ciara has received nine awards.

Year	Nominee / work	Award	Result
2005	"Goodies"	Award Winning R&B/Hip-Hop Songs	Won
2006	"1, 2 Step"	Award Winning R&B/Hip-Hop Songs	Won
2006	"Like You"	Award Winning R&B/Hip-Hop Songs	Won
2006	"Oh"	Award Winning R&B/Hip-Hop Songs	Won
2007	"So What"	Award Winning R&B/Hip-Hop Songs	Won
2008	"Promise"	Award Winning R&B/Hip-Hop Songs	Won
2011	"Ride"	Award Winning R&B/Hip-Hop Songs	Won
2014	"Body Party"	Award Winning R&B/Hip-Hop Songs	Won
2016	"I Bet"	Award Winning R&B/Hip-Hop Songs	Won

== Astra Film and Creative Awards ==
Year	Nominee / work	Award	Result
2024	The Color Purple	Best Cast Ensemble	Won

== BET Awards ==
The BET Awards were established in 2001 by BET. Ciara has received two awards from fourteen nominations.

Year	Nominee / work	Award	Result
2005	"1, 2 Step"	Best Collaboration	Won
2005	"1, 2 Step"	Viewer's Choice	Nominated
2005	Ciara	Best Female R&B Artist	Nominated
2005	Ciara	Best New Artist	Nominated
2006	"Like You"	Best Collaboration	Nominated
2006	"Lose Control"	Video of the Year	Nominated
2007	Ciara	Best Female R&B Artist	Nominated
2007	"Like a Boy"	Video of the Year	Nominated
2007	"Promise"	Viewer's Choice	Nominated
2013	Ciara	Best Smile	Won
2015	Ciara	Best R&B/Pop Female	Nominated
2019	Level Up	BET HER Award	Nominated
2020	Melanin	BET HER Award	Nominated
2021	Rooted	BET HER Award	Nominated

== Billboard AURN R&B/Hip-Hop Awards ==
Year	Nominee / work	Award	Result
2005	Ciara	Top R&B/Hip-hop Artist – Female	Nominated
2005	Ciara	Top R&B/Hip-hop Artist – New	Nominated

== Billboard Music Awards ==
Year	Nominee / work	Award	Result
2004	Ciara	Female New Artist of the Year	Nominated
2004	Ciara	Female R&B/Hip-Hop Artist of the Year	Nominated
2005	Ciara	Female R&B/Hip-Hop Artist of the Year	Nominated
2005	"1,2 Step	Ringtone Of The Year	Nominated
2008	Ciara	Woman of the Year	Won

== Black Beauty Roster ==
Year	Nominee / work	Award	Result
2024	Ciara	Icon Award	Won

== Celebration of Cinema and Television ==
Year	Nominee / work	Award	Result
2023	The cast of The Color Purple	Ensemble Award – Film	Won

== Critics' Choice Movie Awards ==
Year	Nominee / work	Award	Result
2024	The Color Purple	Best Acting Ensemble	Nominated

== Dirty Awards ==
Year	Nominee / work	Award	Result
2005	Ciara	Best R&B Female	Won
2005	Ciara	Best New Dirty Artist	Nominated

== ECHO Awards ==
Year	Nominee / work	Award	Result
2006	Ciara	International Hip-Hop/R&B Artist	Nominated

== Essence Street Style Awards ==
Year	Nominee / work	Award	Result
2015	Ciara	Curator of Cool Award	Won

== Georgia Film Critics Association ==
Year	Nominee / work	Award	Result
2023	The Color Purple	Best Ensemble	Nominated

== Give Her FlowHERS Awards ==
The Give Her FlowHERS Awards is an award gala hosted by Femme It Forward that honors women in music.

Year	Nominee / work	Award	Result
2022	Ciara and Russell Wilson	The Black Love Award	Won
2025	Ciara	Muse Award	Won

== Grammy Awards ==
The Grammy Awards are awarded annually by the National Academy of Recording Arts and Sciences of the United States. Ciara has received one award from five nominations.

Year	Nominee / work	Award	Result
2006	Ciara	Best New Artist	Nominated
2006	"1, 2 Step"	Best Rap/Sung Collaboration	Nominated
2006	"Lose Control" (with Missy Elliott & Fatman Scoop)	Best Rap Song	Nominated
2006	"Lose Control" (with Missy Elliott & Fatman Scoop)	Best Short-Form Music Video	Won
2010	"Love Sex Magic" (feat. Justin Timberlake)	Best Pop Collaboration With Vocals	Nominated

== Groovevolt Music & Fashion Awards ==
Year	Nominee / work	Award	Result
2005	Goodies (feat. Petey Pablo)	Best Song Performance, Duo or Group	Nominated

== Harlem's Fashion Row ==
Year	Nominee / work	Award	Result
2019	Ciara	Icon 360 Award	Won

== Hollywood Beauty Awards ==
Year	Nominee / work	Award	Result
2023	R&C Fragrance	Fragrance of the Year	Won

== International Dance Music Awards ==
Year	Nominee / work	Award	Result
2005	"Goodies"	Best R&B/Urban Dance Track	Nominated

== Jhpiego's "Laughter is the Best Medicine" Gala ==
Year	Nominee / work	Award	Result
2024	Ciara	Visionary Award	Won

== Las Vegas Film Critics Society ==
Year	Nominee / work	Award	Result
2023	The Color Purple	Best Ensemble	Nominated

== MOBO Awards ==
The MOBO Awards is an awards ceremony established in 1995 by Kanya King. Ciara has received five nominations.

Year	Nominee / work	Award	Result
2005	"Lose Control" (with Missy Elliott & Fatman Scoop)	Best Video	Nominated
2005	Ciara	Best R&B Act	Nominated
2009	Ciara	Best R&B Act	Nominated
2009	Ciara	Best International Act	Nominated
2013	Ciara	Best International Act	Nominated

== MuchMusic Video Awards ==
Year	Nominee / work	Award	Result
2005	"1,2 Step"	Best International Video – Artist	Nominated

== MTV European Music Awards ==
Year	Nominee / work	Award	Result
2009	Ciara	Best Urban	Nominated

== MTV Video Music Awards ==
The MTV Video Music Awards is an annual awards ceremony established in 1984 by MTV. Ciara has received nine nominations and two wins so far.

Year	Nominee / work	Award	Result
2005	"1, 2 Step"	Best Dance Video	Nominated
2005	"1, 2 Step"	Best New Artist	Nominated
2005	"Oh"	Best R&B Video	Nominated
2005	"Lose Control"	Best Dance Video	Won
2005	"Lose Control"	Best Hip-Hop Video	Won
2005	"Lose Control"	Breakthrough Video	Nominated
2007	"Like a Boy"	Best Choreography	Nominated
2009	"Love Sex Magic"	Best Choreography	Nominated
2013	"Body Party"	Best Choreography	Nominated

== MTV Video Music Awards Japan ==
Year	Nominee / work	Award	Result
2005	Ciara ft. Petey Pablo - "Goodies"	Best New Artist	Nominated
2006	"Lose Control" (with Missy Elliott and Fatman Scoop)	Best Collaboration	Nominated
2007	"Promise"	Best R&B Video	Nominated

== NAACP Image Awards ==
The NAACP Image Awards is an annual awards ceremony presented by the U.S.-based National Association for the Advancement of Colored People (NAACP) to honor outstanding performances in film, television, theatre, music, and literature.

Year	Nominated work	Category	Result
2024	"How We Roll" (with Chris Brown)	Outstanding Musical Video/Video Album	Nominated
2024	"How We Roll" (with Chris Brown)	Outstanding Duo, Group or Collaboration (Traditional)	Won
2024	The Cast of The Color Purple	Outstanding Ensemble Cast in a Motion Picture	Won

== Nickelodeon Kids' Choice Awards ==
The Nickelodeon Kids' Choice Awards is an annual awards show organized by Nickelodeon. Ciara has received two nominations.

Year	Nominee / work	Award	Result
2006	"1, 2 Step"	Favorite Song	Nominated
2007	Ciara	Favorite Female Singer	Nominated

== Ozone Awards ==
The Ozone Awards is an annual awards ceremony hosted by Ozone Magazine. Ciara has received one award.

Year	Nominee / work	Award	Result
2007	Ciara	Best Female R&B Artist	Won

== Pentawards ==
The Pentawards is an annual packaging design competition and online hub for packaging designers. Participants include designers, freelancers, design agencies, communication & advertising agencies, brands, packaging manufacturers and students.

Year	Nominee / work	Award	Result
2021	Russell Wilson and Ciara's "The Fragrance Duo"	Packaging & Design	Gold

== People's Choice Awards ==
Year	Nominee / work	Award	Result
2014	Ciara	Favorite R&B Artist	Nominated
2016	Ciara	Favorite R&B Artist	Nominated

== Radio Music Awards ==
Year	Nominee / work	Award	Result
2005	Ciara	Artist of the Year/ Mainstream Hit Radio	Nominated
2005	Ciara	Artist of the Year/Urban and Rhythmic Radio	Nominated
2005	"1,2 Step"	Song of the Year/Mainstream Hit Radio	Nominated
2005	"1,2 Step"	Song of the Year/Urban and Rhythmic Radio	Nominated

== Screen Actors Guild Awards ==
Year	Nominee / work	Award	Result
2023	The Color Purple	Outstanding Performance by a Cast in a Motion Picture	Nominated

== Soul Train Music Awards ==
The Soul Train Music Awards is an annual awards show that honors black musicians and entertainers. Ciara has received eight awards from fourteen nominations including the Soul of Justice Award for her philanthropic effort with husband Russel Wilson.

Year	Nominee / work	Award	Result
2005	Ciara	Best R&B/Soul Album: Female	Nominated
2005	Ciara	Best R&B/Soul Single: Female	Won
2005	Ciara	Best R&B/Soul or Rap Dance Cut	Nominated
2005	Ciara	Best R&B/Soul or Rap New Artist	Won
2005	Ciara	Sammy Davis Junior Female Entertainer of the Year	Won
2006	Lose Control	Best R&B/Soul or Rap Music Video	Nominated
2006	Lose Control	Best R&B/Soul or Rap Dance Cut	Won
2010	Ride	Best Dance Performance	Won
2013	Body Party	Best Dance Performance	Won
2018	Level Up	Best Dance Performance	Won
2019	Ciara	Soul Train Certified Award	Nominated
2021	Ciara & Russell Wilson	Soul of Justice Award	Won
2023	Ciara	Soul Train Certified Award	Nominated
2023	"Better Thangs"	Best Dance Performance	Nominated
2023	"How We Roll"	Best Dance Performance	Nominated

== Teen Choice Awards ==
The Teen Choice Awards is an awards show presented annually by the Fox Broadcasting Company. Ciara has received two awards from ten nominations.

Year	Nominee / work	Award	Result
2005	"Oh"	Choice Music Make-Out Song	Won
2005	"Oh"	Choice Summer Song	Nominated
2005	"1, 2 Step"	Choice Music R&B/Hip Hop Track	Won
2005	"1, 2 Step"	Choice Music: Party Starter	Nominated
2005	"1, 2 Step"	Choice Music: Collaboration	Nominated
2005	"Lose Control" (with Missy Elliott and Fatman Scoop)	Choice Summer Song	Nominated
2005	Ciara	Choice: Female	Nominated
2005	Ciara	Choice: R&B Artist	Nominated
2005	Ciara	Choice: Female Breakout Artist	Nominated
2009	"Love Sex Magic"	Best Hook-Up Song	Nominated

== Vibe Awards ==
The Vibe Awards were an annual awards ceremony from 2003 to 2007 hosted by Vibe on UPN for four years and VH1 Soul in its last. Ciara received one award.

Year	Nominee / work	Award	Result
2005	"Oh"	Coolest Collabo	Won
2005	Ciara	Vibe Vixen	Nominated
2005	Ciara	Artist Of The Year	Nominated
2005	"Lose Control"	Reelest Video	Nominated
2005	"Like You""	Coolest Collabo	Nominated

== World Music Awards ==
Year	Nominee / work	Award	Result
2005	Ciara	World's Best Selling R&B Artist	Nominated
2005	Ciara	World's Best Selling New Female Artist	Nominated
2007	Ciara	World's Best Selling R&B Female Artist	Won
2014	Ciara	Best Song "Body Party"	Nominated
2014	Ciara	Best Song "I'm Out"	Nominated
2014	Ciara	Best Video "Body Party"	Nominated
2014	Ciara	Best Video "I'm Out"	Nominated
2014	Ciara	Best Album "Ciara"	Nominated

== Young Hollywood Hall of Fame ==
Year	Nominee / work	Award	Result
2005	Ciara	Musical Artist	Inducted
