= Goodies: The Videos & More =

Goodies: The Videos and More

Video by Ciara
- Released: July 12, 2005
- Length: 90:00
- Label: LaFace
- Director: Jim Swaffield

Goodies: The Videos & More is the first DVD collection released by American R&B singer Ciara. It was released on July 12, 2005. The DVD includes music videos for "Goodies", "1, 2 Step", and "Oh" with interactive, multi-angle formats. Additional features included behind-the-scenes documentaries and a step-by-step demonstration of Ciara's choreography. An audio CD contains unreleased tracks and remixes. The DVD was released in Europe as a CD/DVD combination of Ciara's debut album Goodies.

== North American DVD ==
- The Videos
1. "Goodies" (featuring Petey Pablo)
2. "1, 2 Step" featuring (Missy Elliott)
3. "Oh" (featuring Ludacris)
- Extended Features
1. Behind the Scenes Footage Including Soul Train Awards 2005
2. The Making of "1, 2 Step" (BET's Access Granted)
3. The Making of "Oh" (MTV2's Making the Video)
4. Exclusive Dance Rehearsal Footage
5. Commentary by Ciara on Her Videos **
6. Ciara teaching "1, 2 Step"
7. Alternate Footage from "Oh" with Lyrics **
8. Multi-Angle Footage of "Goodies" **

** Expanded Functionality

- Bonus CD Features
1. "1, 2 Step" [Don Candiani Reggaeton Mix] (featuring Missy Elliott)
2. "Oh" [DJ Volume "South Beach" Remix] (featuring Ludacris)
3. "Crazy"
4. "Represent Me"

== European CD/DVD ==
- European CD track listing
1. "Goodies" (featuring Petey Pablo)
2. "1, 2 Step" (featuring Missy Elliott)
3. "Thug Style"
4. "Hotline"
5. "Oh" (featuring Ludacris)
6. "Pick Up the Phone"
7. "Lookin' at You"
8. "Ooh Baby"
9. "Next to You" (featuring R. Kelly)
10. "And I"
11. "Other Chicks"
12. "The Title"
13. "Goodies" (featuring T.I. & Jazze Pha)
14. "Crazy"
15. "Oh" [DJ Volume "South Beach" Remix] (featuring Ludacris)
16. "1, 2 Step" [Don Candiani Reggaeton Mix] (featuring Missy Elliott)
17. "Goodies" [Richard X Remix] (featuring M.I.A.)
- European DVD
1. Ciara teaching "1, 2 Step"
2. "Goodies" commentary
3. "Goodies" (music video) (featuring Petey Pablo)
4. The Making of "1, 2 Step" (BET's Access Granted)
5. "1, 2 Step" commentary
6. "1, 2 Step" (music video) (featuring Missy Elliott)
7. Behind the Scenes Footage Including Soul Train Awards 2005
8. Make-up chair
9. Exclusive Dance Rehearsal Footage
10. The Making of "Oh" (MTV2's Making the Video)
11. Alternate Footage from "Oh" with Lyrics
12. "Oh" (music video) (featuring Ludacris)
13. Multi-Angle Footage of "Goodies"
