= And I =

Single by Ciara

from the album Goodies
- Released: August 15, 2005
- Recorded: Phoenix Ave. Studios, Atlanta, Georgia
- Genre: R&B
- Length: 3:53
- Label: LaFace, Sho'nuff
- Songwriters: Ciara Harris; Adonis Shropshire
- Producer: Adonis Shropshire

Ciara singles chronology
"Like You" (2005)	"And I" (2005)	"So What" (2006)

Music video
- "And I" on YouTube

"And I" is a song written by American R&B singer Ciara, and produced by Adonis Shropshire for Ciara's first album, Goodies (2004). It was released as the album's fourth and final single on August 15, 2005. "In July 2005, Ciara had mentioned in interviews that the album's fourth single would "most likely be "Thug Style" or "Pick Up the Phone" - or maybe even "And I"", with "And I" being the final choice.

== Chart performance ==
At the time of the US release of "And I", Ciara's collaboration with Bow Wow, "Like You", and her collaboration with Missy Elliott, "Lose Control", were at the height of their popularity. "And I" peaked at 96 on the US Billboard Hot 100 and 27 on Billboard's Hot R&B/Hip-Hop Singles & Tracks chart, which were poor positions compared to those attained by the first three singles from the album Goodies. It was not released outside North America because of this.

== Music video ==
The music video for "And I", directed by the Fat Cats, is loosely based on the 1992 film The Bodyguard with Kevin Costner and Whitney Houston. It takes place in a forest and on the set of a music video. When Ciara's boyfriend (Carmelo Anthony), is flirting with another woman while Ciara is filming her music video. When Ciara's bodyguard (Datari Turner) takes her to visit her boyfriend in her trailer, he opens the door and sees the boyfriend kissing another woman. The bodyguard tells her not to go inside. When she realizes he has been cheating on her, Ciara sits on a log under lights that have been rigged to fall on her (earlier in the video, a man had been acting strangely whilst Ciara was signing autographs). Her bodyguard saves her just before the lights fall and Ciara holds him in her arms.

The Video ranked number 94 on BET’s Top 100 Videos Of 2005 Notarized Countdown

== Format and track listing ==
- Promotional CD
1. "And I" (Album version)
2. "And I" (Instrumental)

== Charts ==
Chart (2005)	Peak position
US Billboard Hot 100	96
US Hot R&B/Hip-Hop Songs (Billboard)	27

== Certifications ==
Region	Certification	Certified units/sales
United States (RIAA)	Platinum	1,000,000^{‡}
^{‡} Sales+streaming figures based on certification alone.
