= Ten To One Rum =

Rum brand

Ten To One
- Native name: Ten To One Rum
- Company type: Private
- Founded: 2019
- Founder: Marc Farrell
- Products: Rum
- Owners: Ciara, Marc Farrell
- Website: www.tentoonerum.com

Ten To One Rum is a Caribbean rum brand founded by Marc Farrell in 2019. Ten To One's name was inspired by the origin of the West Indies Federation, which consisted of 10 countries. The name references a famous quote from Trinidad and Tobago’s first Prime Minister, Dr. Eric Williams

Ciara joined Ten To One Rum as an investor, co-owner, and director in October 2021. In her new role, Ciara will work closely with Marc Farrell across the areas of marketing, creative, business development, and strategic partnerships.

== Varieties ==
The brand's current product selection includes a Caribbean White Rum, a Caribbean Dark Rum, and a Five Origin Select Rum.

In celebration of Black History Month, the company has partnered with Uncle Nearest Premium Whiskey for a Caribbean rum edition.
