= Ciara =

American singer-songwriter (born 1985)

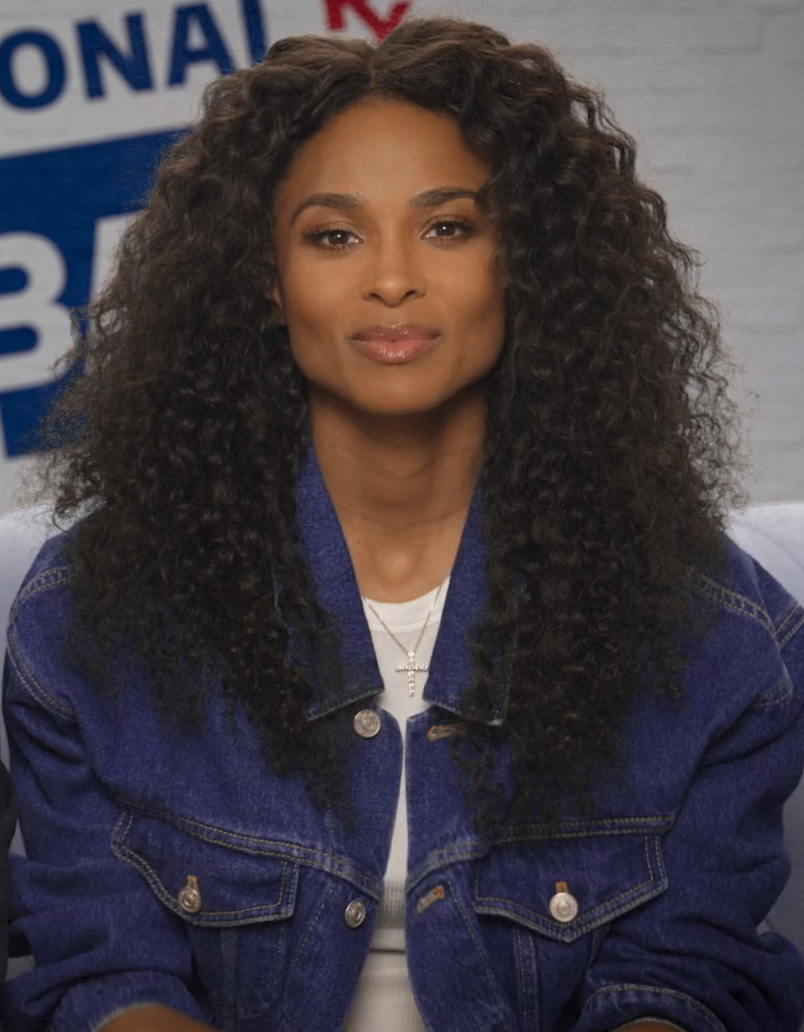
- Ciara in 2019
- Born: Ciara Princess Harris; October 25, 1985 (age 41); Fort Hood, Texas, U.S.
- Other name: CiCi
- Citizenship: United States; Benin (since July 26, 2025)
- Occupations: Singer; songwriter; dancer; actress
- Years active: 2001–present
- Works: Discography; filmography
- Spouse: Russell Wilson (m. 2016)
- Children: 4
- Awards: Full list
- Musical career
- Origin: Atlanta, Georgia, U.S.
- Genres: R&B; pop; hip-hop; dance; crunk
- Instrument: Vocals
- Labels: Uptown; Republic; ADA; Beauty Marks/Vydia; Epic; Jive; Zomba; LaFace; Sho'nuff
- Website: officialciara.com

Ciara Princess Wilson (/siˈɛərə/ see-AIR-ə; née Harris; born October 25, 1985) is an American singer, songwriter, dancer, and actress. She was discovered by record producer Jazze Pha in the early 2000s, and rose to prominence with her debut studio album, Goodies (2004). Its namesake lead single (featuring Petey Pablo) peaked atop the Billboard Hot 100, while the follow-ups, "1, 2 Step" (featuring Missy Elliott) and "Oh" (featuring Ludacris), both peaked at No. 2 on the chart. The album received quadruple platinum certification by the Recording Industry Association of America (RIAA), and received two nominations at the 48th Annual Grammy Awards. Ciara also guest appeared on the 2005 singles "Lose Control" by Missy Elliott and "Like You" by Bow Wow, both of which peaked at No. 3 on the Billboard Hot 100.

Her second studio album, Ciara: The Evolution (2006), topped the Billboard 200 and spawned three platinum-certified songs: the top 10 single "Get Up" (featuring Chamillionaire) and the top 20 singles "Promise" and "Like a Boy". Ciara's third studio album, Fantasy Ride (2009), spawned top 10 single "Love Sex Magic" (featuring Justin Timberlake), which was nominated for Best Pop Collaboration with Vocals at the 52nd Annual Grammy Awards. Her fourth studio album, Basic Instinct (2010), spawned the top 50 single "Ride" (featuring Ludacris), but saw a steep commercial decline. She then signed with Epic Records to release her self-titled fifth album (2013), which peaked at No. 2 on the Billboard 200 and spawned the double platinum single "Body Party". Her sixth album, Jackie (2015) spawned the platinum single "I Bet".

In 2016, Ciara signed a modeling contract with IMG, became a Global Brand Ambassador for the cosmetics company Revlon, and married quarterback Russell Wilson. Her seventh album and first independent release, Beauty Marks (2019), entered the Billboard 200 and spawned the platinum single "Level Up". She signed with Uptown Records for the release of her first extended play, CiCi (2023). Her eighth studio album, also titled CiCi, was released August 22, 2025; it was preceded by the single "Ecstasy".

In her acting career, she has appeared in the films All You've Got (2006), Mama, I Want to Sing! (2012), That's My Boy (2012), and the television series The Game (2013). She starred in the 2023 remake of The Color Purple as Nettie. Ciara has received multiple accolades, including a Grammy Award, two BET Awards, the Woman of the Year award from Billboard Women in Music, two MTV Video Music Awards, eight Soul Train Awards, and 15 Ascap Music Awards. As of 2019, Ciara has sold over 45 million records worldwide.

== Early life ==
Ciara Princess Harris was born in Fort Hood, Texas on October 25, 1985, the only child of Jackie and Carlton Clay Harris. An army brat, she grew up in Georgia, New York, Utah, California, Arizona, and Nevada. She was named after the Revlon fragrance Ciara which was introduced in 1973. During her teens, Ciara and her family settled in College Park, Georgia, a suburb of Atlanta, where she attended North Clayton High School before graduating from Riverdale High School in Riverdale, Georgia.

In her mid-teens, Ciara formed the all-girl group Hearsay with two of her friends. The group recorded demos, but as time went on, they began to have differences and eventually parted ways. Despite this setback, Ciara signed a publishing deal as a songwriter. Her first writing credit was on Blu Cantrell's debut album, So Blu, for the song "10,000 Times". She also wrote the song "Got Me Waiting" for fellow R&B singer Fantasia Barrino's debut album, Free Yourself. It was when she was writing songs that she met music producer Jazze Pha, whom she called her "music soulmate". In 2002, the two recorded four demos: "1, 2 Step", "Thug Style", "Pick Up the Phone", and "Lookin' at You", which all appeared on her debut album that was released two years later. "1, 2 Step" was the second single released from the album and it was a hit.

== Career ==
=== 2003–2005: Goodies ===
After graduating from Riverdale High School in 2003, she was signed by LaFace Records executive, L.A. Reid, to whom she was introduced by Jazze Pha. She began production on her debut album later that year. In early 2004, she wrote a demo with record producer, Sean Garrett, which came to the attention of Lil Jon and became her debut single "Goodies". Lil Jon later said that he knew it would be big seeing how it sounded similar to Usher's international hit, "Yeah!".

Ciara released her debut album Goodies on September 28, 2004. The album debuted at number 3 on the U.S. Billboard 200, selling 125,000 copies in its initial week and topped the Top R&B/Hip-Hop Albums chart. After the release of the album, Ciara was called the "First Lady of Crunk&B". Goodies had a 71-week run on the Billboard 200, and was certified four-times platinum by the Recording Industry Association of America on June 7, 2024. Charting at twenty-two on the Canadian Albums Chart, it was certified Platinum by the Canadian Recording Industry Association. The album charted at No. 26 on the UK Albums Chart, and spent 20 weeks on the chart. It was certified Gold by the British Phonographic Industry.

Goodies' lead single, the title track, featuring Petey Pablo, was released on June 8, 2004. Conceived as a crunk female counterpart to Usher's "Yeah!", the lyrical content goes against the grain, speaking of abstinence, rejecting advances because "the goodies will stay in the jar." Critics hailed it as an "anthem of the summer" and one of the best singles of the year, complimenting its dance-feel and beat, and the irony of the "clever" lyrics. The single performed well worldwide, topping the charts in Canada, the United States and the United Kingdom, and charting in the top 10 of other charts, receiving triple Platinum certification in the United States. "1, 2 Step" featuring Missy Elliott was released as the album's second single. The song peaked in the top 10 of many countries, topping the charts in Canada, and went on to become seven-times Platinum in the United States, as well as Platinum or Gold in many countries. "Oh" featuring Ludacris was released as the third single on March 5, 2005. The song performed well worldwide, appearing in the top 10 of seven charts, and certified either Platinum or Gold in multiple regions.

Following the success of the album, Ciara released a CD/DVD titled Goodies: The Videos & More in the United States on July 12, 2005, which featured remixes to "1, 2 Step" and "Oh", as well as two new songs. The release was certified platinum in the United States. She made guest appearances on Missy Elliott's single "Lose Control" and on Bow Wow's single "Like You", which both peaked at No. 3 in the United States and obtained worldwide success. She was an opening act for Gwen Stefani's Harajuku Lovers Tour 2005 and went on tour with Chris Brown and Bow Wow on the Holiday Jam Tour in December 2005. At the 48th Annual Grammy Awards, Ciara received four nominations for Best New Artist, Best Rap/Sung Collaboration for "1, 2 Step", Best Rap Song for Missy Elliott's single "Lose Control", and won her last nomination, Best Short Form Music Video for "Lose Control".

=== 2006–2007: Ciara: The Evolution and acting debut ===
On December 5, 2006, Ciara released her second studio album, Ciara: The Evolution. According to the singer, the title of the album is "about so much more than just my personal growth – it's about the evolution of music, the evolution of dance, the evolution of fashion." The source of the album's creativity such as the sound and edge comes from Ciara in general. Ciara: The Evolution became Ciara's first and only number 1 album on the U.S. Billboard 200, and her second No. 1 on the Top R&B/Hip-Hop Albums charts with sales of 338,000 in the first week. The album went on to be certified platinum by the RIAA in the United States, and has sold 1.3 million copies according to Nielsen SoundScan.

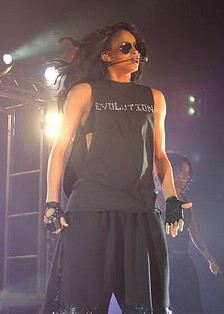
Ciara performing during her debut tour Ciara: Live in Concert in November 2006

The album's international lead single, "Get Up", which features Chamillionaire, reached No. 7 in the United States and gained a platinum accreditation. It reached No. 5 in New Zealand. The song was used for the film Step Up (2006) and featured on the film's soundtrack. The album's US lead single, "Promise", reached number 11 on the Billboard Hot 100 and became her third number 1 single on the Hot R&B/Hip-Hop Songs chart. "Like a Boy" was released as the second international single which reached within the top 20 in the UK, Finland, France, Ireland, Sweden Switzerland, as well as in the United States. The fourth and final single from the album, "Can't Leave 'em Alone", reached number 10 on the Hot R&B/Hip-Hop Songs chart and No. 40 on the Billboard Hot 100. The song became Ciara's fifth single to peak in the top in New Zealand, peaking at No. 4. The song achieved moderate success in other international markets.

In support of the album, Ciara went on her first headlining tour in October 2006. The tour stopped in 17 clubs in cities throughout the United States and was met with mixed to positive reviews; critics were divided regarding the pre-recorded backing tracks and remarked that Ciara was slightly under-prepared to host her headlining tour, but ultimately praised her energetic choreography. In August 2007, she headlined the Screamfest '07 tour with fellow rapper, T.I. Critics praised her performance for her gracious dancing and being able to command a sold-out arena. Ciara, along with Chris Brown and Akon, was a support act for Rihanna's Good Girl Gone Bad Tour in the United Kingdom. She made a guest appearance on "So What" by Field Mob. The single went on to become a top 10 hit on the Billboard Hot 100. She also appeared on Tiffany Evans' single "Promise Ring". The song achieved little success on the Hot R&B/Hip-Hop Songs chart.

In addition to her music, Ciara made her acting debut in the MTV Films production All You've Got in May 2006. In the movie she played Becca Whiley, a teenager who is competing in a volleyball tournament. The movie received mixed to positive reviews; critics said the movie was predictable but still enjoyable.

=== 2008–2011: Fantasy Ride, Basic Instinct and label change ===
In October 2008, Ciara was honored as Billboard's "Woman of the Year", because of her success as a recording artist and leadership in embracing the changing music business. Although her third album was originally scheduled for a September 2008 release, Fantasy Ride was released after several delays in May 2009. The album combines her R&B and hip hop sound from her previous albums along with a new pop and dance sound. While talking to MTV News, Ciara said, "I'm having a bit more fun with my lyrics. I'm not afraid. In the beginning, I was conscious and really protective and somewhat scared about doing some things. With this album I'm not holding back, there's freedom. It's just the space I'm in right now." It became Ciara's first top 10 album in the UK.

"Go Girl" was the first single released from the album. It was originally the lead single from the album, but the single achieved minimum success and was later deemed a promo single. However, the single managed to reach the top of the charts in Japan. The album's official lead single, "Never Ever", which features Young Jeezy, was released in the United States in January 2009 and reached a peak of No. 9 on the U.S. Hot R&B/Hip-Hop Songs. The second single, "Love Sex Magic", featuring Justin Timberlake, became a worldwide hit, peaking within the top 10 in 20 countries including the U.S., where it peaked at No. 10 on the Billboard Hot 100. It went on to be certified platinum in Australia and received a gold accreditation in New Zealand. It received a nomination for "Best Pop Collaboration with Vocals" at the 52nd Annual Grammy Awards and also for Best Choreography in a Video at the 2009 MTV Video Music Awards. "Work", the final single, achieved moderate success in international markets.

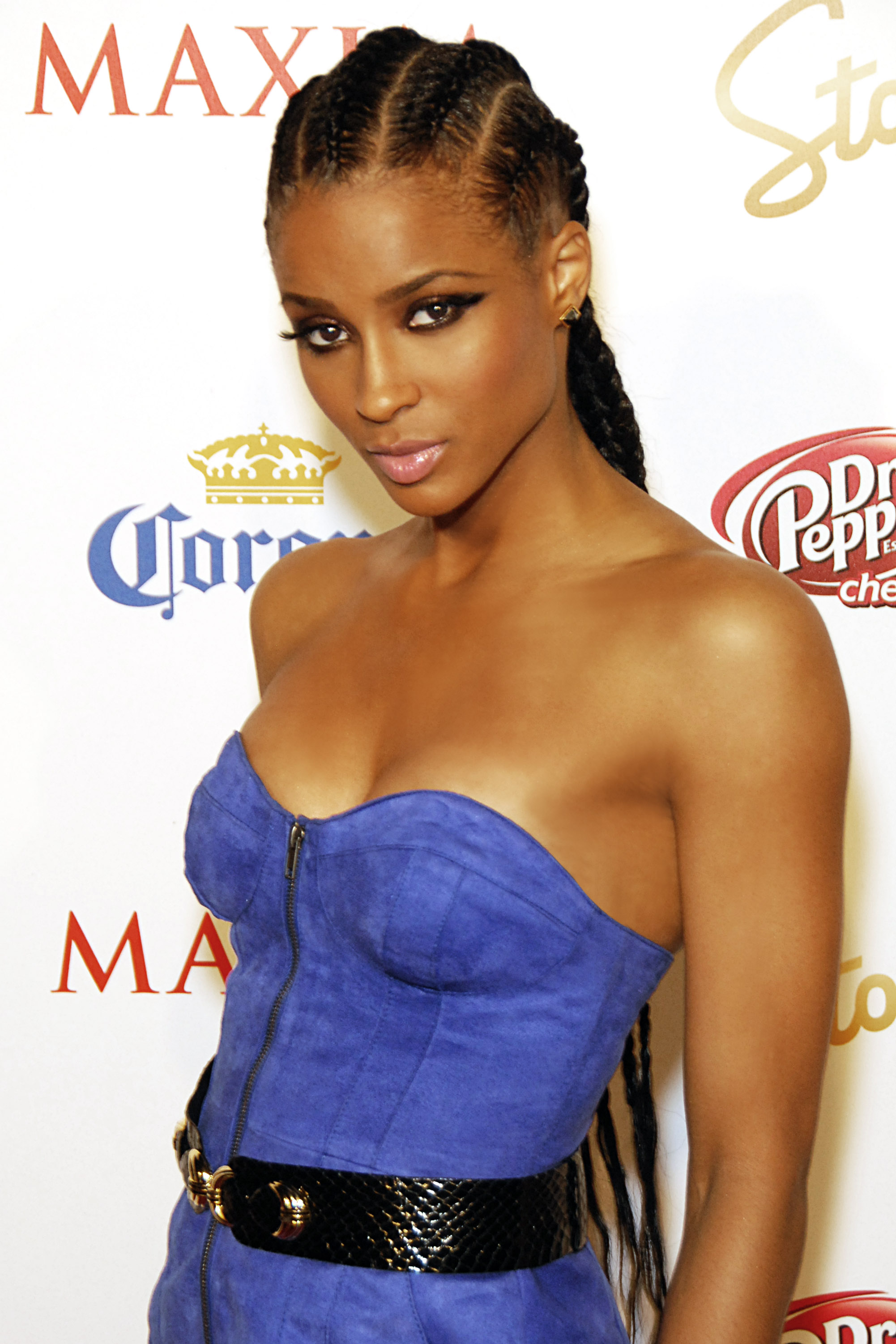
Ciara at Maxim Magazine's 10th Annual Hot 100 Celebration in Santa Monica, California, May 2009

In July 2009, Ciara headlined the Jay-Z & Ciara Live tour with Jay-Z. Her performance received mixed reviews; critics said although her dancing was top-notch, she seemed disconnected from the crowd. She was the support act for Britney Spears's Circus tour, where she performed eight nights at London's prestigious O2 Arena during June 2009. Her performance received rave reviews from critics and fans alike, who noted her dancing skills as being spectacular and arguably better than Britney Spears'. Ciara made a guest appearance on Nelly's single "Stepped On My J'z" from his album Brass Knuckles. The song achieved minimal success in the U.S.. Ciara was also featured on Enrique Iglesias' single, "Takin' Back My Love", from his Greatest Hits album. The song became an international hit, peaking in the top 10 of over 15 countries, and being certified Gold in Russia, with sales of over 100,000. In February 2010, Ciara along with Pitbull was featured on the remix to Ludacris' hit single "How Low". In March 2010, Ciara made a cameo appearance in the music video of Usher's single, "Lil' Freak".

Ciara released her fourth studio album, Basic Instinct, on December 14, 2010. She told Pete Lewis of Blues & Soul magazine that the album is about her trusting her instinct and going back to the R&B/urban basics, in the days of "Goodies" and "1, 2 Step". It was executive-produced by the singer alongside her A&R agent Mark Pitts and writing/production duo Tricky Stewart and The-Dream who also produced records for her previous album, Fantasy Ride. Basic Instinct debuted at number 44 on the U.S. Billboard 200 chart, with first-week sales of 37,000 copies, becoming her first album not to peak within the top three. On the U.S. R&B/Hip-Hop Albums chart, the album opened at No. 11. The lead single, "Ride", which features Ludacris, was released on April 26, 2010. It peaked at number 42 on the U.S. Billboard Hot 100, number 3 on the U.S. Hot R&B/Hip-Hop Songs chart, becoming her 12th top 10 hit on the chart, and number 75 on the UK Singles Chart. The accompanying music video won the award for "Best Dance Performance" at the 2010 Soul Train Music Awards. "Speechless" was released as the second single from the album and achieved minimal success, peaking at only No. 74 on the Hot R&B/Hip-Hop Songs chart. "Gimmie Dat", the third single from the album was praised by critics but failed to become a hit, peaking at only No. 63 on the Hot R&B/Hip-Hop Songs chart, and No. 27 on the urban charts in the UK. In November 2010, Ciara performed at the Summerbeatz tour alongside Flo Rida, Jay Sean, Akon, Travie McCoy and Ja Rule. In the summer of 2011, Ciara was a part of the Malibu Rum Tour. She performed in seven shows across the US.

In February 2011, after rumors came out that Ciara had been dropped by Jive Records, she released an official statement to her Facebook page complaining of inadequate promotion and funding from the label. She stated that she received a lack of support from the label, and even paid for the promotion of some singles, such as "Gimmie Dat", herself. The frustration she felt while working with her third and fourth albums led her to request that she be released from her contract. In May 2011, Ciara was removed from the Jive Records website roster. On July 12, 2011, it was reported that she had reunited with L.A. Reid by signing with his record label Epic Records, and was confirmed in September 2011.

=== 2012–2013: Ciara and further acting ===
During an interview with Sway in the Morning in February 2012, Ciara revealed that she would be taking her time recording her fifth studio album, "It's just really about the vibe, and I'll just tell you that it's a good vibe going. It's really important for me to take my time with this record and it's important for the whole team. It's really, really good energy." She has been working on the album with a number of producers and songwriters, including Hit-Boy, Soundz, Diane Warren, Tricky Stewart, and The Underdogs. In an interview, Ciara said "I worked with some people that are very fresh, which I'm excited about... When it comes to artists, when it comes to writers, when it comes to producers, I really wanted to push. We pretty much reached out and worked with a lot of people that I've never worked with before, which is really fun."

During a press conference with MTV in May 2012, Ciara announced her fifth studio album would be titled One Woman Army and said the lead single, "Sweat", would be out very soon. The single, which features rapper 2 Chainz, premiered online on June 4, 2012, and was to be released via iTunes on June 19, 2012. However, the release of the single was scrapped at the last minute for unknown reasons. On August 13, 2012, Ciara revealed that the official lead single for the album would be titled "Sorry". On September 13, 2012, the official music video for "Sorry" was premiered on BET's 106 & Park as well as VEVO. "Sorry" was made available for purchase as a digital download on September 25, 2012, and impacted U.S. Urban contemporary and Rhythmic radio stations on October 9, 2012. In the United States, "Sorry" reached a peak at 40 on the U.S. Billboard Hot R&B/Hip-Hop Songs chart while charting at number 22 on Billboard's Bubbling Under Hot 100 Singles chart listing of the top 25 songs that have yet to enter the Billboard Hot 100.

On October 21, 2012, a magazine, Rap-Up, posted a behind-the-scenes sneak peek of "Got Me Good", the second single from the album. The song and video, which was directed by Joseph Kahn, premiered on the Sony JumboTron in Times Square in New York City on October 25, 2012. The single was released via digital download on November 6, 2012. "Got Me Good" impacted rhythmic radio on November 13, and mainstream radio on December 4.

On April 15, 2013, the same day the album's track listing was revealed, it was also announced that the album is not titled One Woman Army anymore and that the new title is Ciara. Due to their low performance on the charts, the label decided not to include "Sweat", "Sorry", and "Got Me Good" on the tracklist. Instead, it was later announced that a new song titled "Body Party" would serve as the lead single. It was released in March 2013 and reached number 22 on the Billboard Hot 100 and number 2 on the U.S. Billboard "Hot R&B/Hip-Hop Songs" chart. The second single was "I'm Out" featuring Nicki Minaj. The album was released on July 9, 2013. The album debuted at number 2 on the Billboard 200 chart, with first-week sales of 59,000 copies in the U.S. The album became Ciara's fourth album to chart within the top three entries of the Billboard chart. The album charted at number two on the Top R&B/Hip-Hop Albums

Aside from music in 2012, Ciara also starred in two movies during this time. She starred in the straight-to-DVD film, Mama, I Want to Sing!. She played Amara Winter, a preacher's daughter who was discovered by a well-established musician. She appeared as Brie in the 2012 comedy film, That's My Boy. Ciara made an appearance as herself playing Lauren London's best friend on the Season 6 premiere of BET's The Game which aired on March 26, 2013, she continued to be a recurring cast member throughout the season.

=== 2014–2016: Jackie and motherhood ===
In September 2013, producer Mike WiLL Made It revealed that Ciara had begun work on her sixth studio album. In December 2013, Ciara confirmed she was in the process of making a new album. During an interview with Rap-Up magazine Ciara revealed that recording for her sixth album began around Thanksgiving of 2013 and she would be releasing new music "really soon". In late January 2014, Ciara premiered a live version of a song entitled "Anytime" at the Degree Women Grammys Celebration in Los Angeles, on February 2, 2014, Ciara premiered the studio version, produced Boi-1da and Katalyst featuring her then-boyfriend and rapper Future. After her engagement to Future, Ciara revealed to W in April 2014 that her sixth studio album would be predominantly inspired by her then-fiancé. Ciara gave birth to her first child in May 2014, a boy fathered by Future. After claims of Future's infidelity during their relationship had surfaced, it was reported that the couple's engagement had been called off. After a very public break-up, Ciara's album release was further postponed to 2015, and during that time the singer "quietly" recorded new music, while concentrating on motherhood.

"I Bet", the lead single from her album Jackie, was released on January 26, 2015. In May 2015, Ciara embarked on her first headlining tour in six years. The month-long Jackie Tour kicked off on May 3, 2015, in Chicago and included stops in New York, Boston, New Orleans, Dallas, and Los Angeles. The first round of US dates wrapped May 31 in San Francisco. Ciara's sixth album, Jackie, was released on May 1, 2015. It includes the singles "I Bet" and "Dance like We're Making Love". The album debuted at No. 17 on the Billboard 200 with 25,000 units (19,900 in sales), and has the lowest first-week sales amongst her first six albums. After appearing in the US talent show, I Can Do That, she host the 2016 edition of the Billboard Music Awards. A few months later, she announced during the red-carpet of the American Music Awards that she was pregnant.

=== 2017–2021: Beauty Marks and entrepreneur projects ===
During 2016, Ciara worked on her seventh studio album and stated that the album would feature her undertaking a new musical direction. On January 27, 2017, it was announced that Ciara had signed a deal with Warner Bros. Records. On July 17, 2018, Ciara released the single and its accompanying music video, "Level Up". The song was the first single from her seventh studio album Beauty Marks, released on May 10, 2019. In addition to "Level Up", the album spawned the singles "Freak Me", "Dose", "Greatest Love" and "Thinkin Bout You". Ciara performed "Thinkin Bout You" at the 2019 Billboard Music Awards.

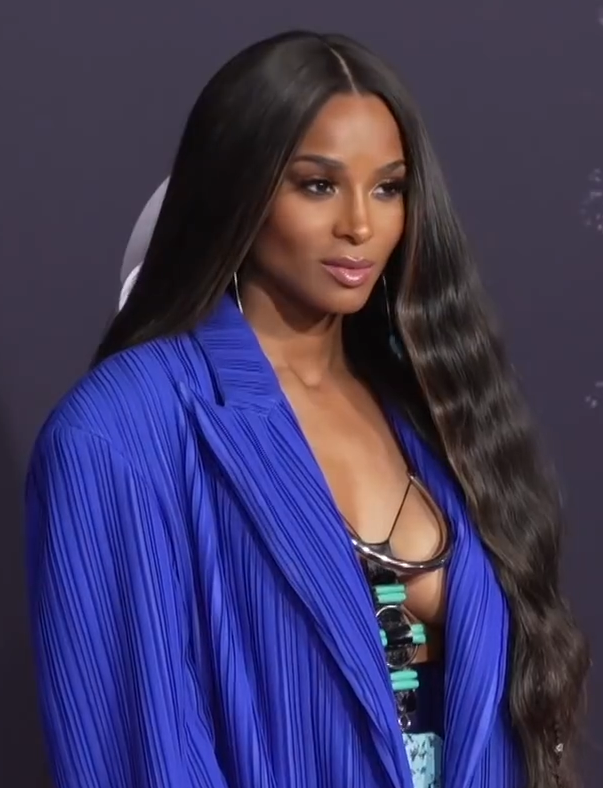
Ciara attending the 2019 American Music Awards in Los Angeles

In July 2019, it was announced that Ciara would appear as a judge alongside David Dobrik and Debbie Gibson in a musical competition on Nickelodeon titled America's Most Musical Family. On December 23, 2019, Ciara featured on the remix of longtime friend Blanco Brown's "The Git Up".

After taking a break from music to focus on her pregnancy, Ciara released a song and video titled "Rooted", featuring Ester Dean, on August 13, 2020. Between 2020 and 2021, Ciara and her husband Russell Wilson embarked on several business projects, opening the fashion house The House of LR&C, and signed a first look deal with Amazon Studios to start Why Not You Productions.

=== 2022–present: The Color Purple and CiCi releases ===
In March 2022, it was announced that Ciara had joined the cast of The Color Purple as Nettie Harris; the film was released in the United States on December 25, 2023, by Warner Bros. Pictures. Ciara appeared on the cover of the 2022 Sports Illustrated Swimsuit Issue, making her the third musician to do so since the issue launched in 1964.

On June 29, 2022, it was announced that Ciara had signed a record deal with Republic and Uptown Records, in partnership with her label, Beauty Marks Entertainment. Ciara's eighth studio album will be released through the partnership. The first release from the deal was announced to be the single, "Jump", released on July 8, 2022. In September 2022, it was insinuated that Ciara had collaborated with Summer Walker for a second time. On September 28, 2022, Ciara released the uptempo single "Better Thangs", which features Walker. The official music video, directed by Mia Barnes premiered online on September 30, 2022. On choosing Walker as a collaborator, Ciara divulged "I've always done collaborations because it felt right, it was authentic. It felt like the artist was going to bring a certain flair to this song that it needed... I played [Summer Walker] a few songs on the album and... this is the one song that I thought was perfect for her, but I wanted it for her because she also really liked it." The single has reached No. 13 on the US Billboard Adult R&B Songs chart, becoming Ciara's first top 20 hit on the chart. In November 2022 a remix of "Better Thangs" featuring rapper GloRilla was released.

On March 24, 2023, Ciara released the single "Da Girls", which was followed on April 14, 2023, with a remix with Lola Brooke and Lady London. Ciara then appeared as a guest performer during Jackson Wang's Coachella performance; the pair performed XG's song "Left Right", and a medley of Ciara's songs: "Lose Control", "Level Up", "Goodies" and "1, 2, Step". The set included a short snippet of Wang and Ciara's song "Slow", which was released as a single on the same day. On April 25, 2023, the pair released the official music video to "Slow", featuring dance-heavy choreography. On May 12, 2023, Ciara released Versions, an EP with remixes to "Da Girls", featuring Derrick Milano, Lay Bankz, and the previously released Girls Mix. On June 30, 2023, Ciara released "Get Loose" with Agnez Mo. In August 2023, Ciara announced her EP, titled CiCi would be released on August 18, 2023. The lead single from the EP was "How We Roll", which also features Chris Brown as co-lead. On August 18, 2023, Ciara released CiCi; the music video to the EP's second single, "Forever", which features Lil Baby, was released the same day. On November 3, 2023, Ciara released a remix to "How We Roll", with a featured rap from Lil Wayne. On November 10, 2023, Ciara released the single "Fantasy", in collaboration with Canadian EDM trio Keys N Krates.

On June 21, 2024, a remix of Hulvey's 2023 song "Altar", featuring Ciara, was officially released. On July 30, the singer announced her single "Run It Up" featuring Bossman Dlow was released August 9, 2024. She followed this release with "Wassup", a single in collaboration with rapper Busta Rhymes, on September 27, 2024. In the summer of 2024, Ciara embarked on the Out of This World: The Missy Elliott Experience Tour as a supporting act for Missy Elliott, alongside Rhymes; the tour lasted for 24 dates across the United States.

On April 4, 2025, Ciara released the single "Ecstasy", garnering universally positive reviews, and announced that her eighth studio album, CiCi (an extension of the EP of the same name), would be released on July 11, 2025. Ciara featured on the cover of the May 2025 issue of L'Officiel USA, sharing details of the upcoming studio album, and discussed her career and family. On May 9, 2025, British DJ Flex (UK) released the single "So & So", featuring Ciara, which contains re-recorded vocals from her 2006 single "Get Up". On June 1, 2025, Ciara headlined the Mighty Hoopla festival in London. A remix to "Ecstasy", featuring singers Normani and Teyana Taylor, was released on June 6, 2025. On July 28, 2025, Ciara surprise released the single "This Right Here", which features Latto and previous collaborator Jazze Pha. After a change of release date, CiCi was delivered on August 22, 2025. On August 29, a music video for the Diamond Platnumz collaboration "Low" was released. It was the second-most added song to U.S. urban contemporary radio the week of September 29, 2025, and reached No. 20 on R&B/Hip-Hop Airplay. On November 14, 2025, she released the super deluxe promotional single "Nice n' Sweet", featuring Ghanaian singer Moliy and Nigerian singer Oxlade. On December 31, 2025, Ciara performed on Dick Clark's New Year's Rockin' Eve; she performed "1, 2, Step", "Oh", "Level Up", "Goodies", "Low", and "Nice n' Sweet".

On July 6, 2026, Ciara released "Yes" in celebration of her 10th wedding anniversary to Wilson. On the same day, she appeared in a video montage in an Aaliyah tribute, where she lauded the singer during the finale at the 2026 Essence Festival of Culture.

== Artistry ==
=== Vocals and musical style ===
"Goodies"
Ciara's debut single "Goodies" boasts the whistle production that characterized her early sound.

Ciara is known for her often "breathy soprano" vocals. Allison Stewart of The Washington Post commented that she has a "reedy, agile voice, capable of conveying the only three emotions (sexy, sassy, sad) an R&B singer needs". Randall Roberts of the Los Angeles Times said that she "has been the most synthetic of the R&B divas over the past decade, an electro-leaning vocalist whose instrumental palate has heavily favored stark 808 beats, sassy and seductive vocal lines, and, often, weird, futuristic Gary Numan-esque bleeps woven through." He commented:

"Ciara's sights are mostly set on one aspect of said universal truth – desire – and how it manifests itself on the dance floor... at the mall... or in the bedroom...

Ciara's debut album featured production from Jazze Pha. In reviewing the album, Slant Magazine noted the influence of Destiny's Child, and compared some of its material to Aaliyah's, albeit "less sexy". In reviewing her second album Ciara: The Evolution, Jody Rosen of Entertainment Weekly wrote: "Ciara's comfort with rave-inspired beats sets her apart from Cassie, Amerie, Rihanna, and other would-Beyoncés...(Her) singing is nimble throughout: She whispers, coos, wails, and reels off speedy syncopations worthy of Beyoncé herself." Her third album, Fantasy Ride, saw the singer showcasing a new pop and dance direction, which she recalled later on her sixth album Jackie. Ciara's music is generally contemporary R&B, but it also incorporates other genres including hip hop, crunk, dance-pop, electropop and funk. Critics have said her singles "Goodies", "1, 2 Step", "Get Up", and "Go Girl" are club bangers. Ciara has also dabbled in performing gospel, country, and afrobeats.

=== Influences ===
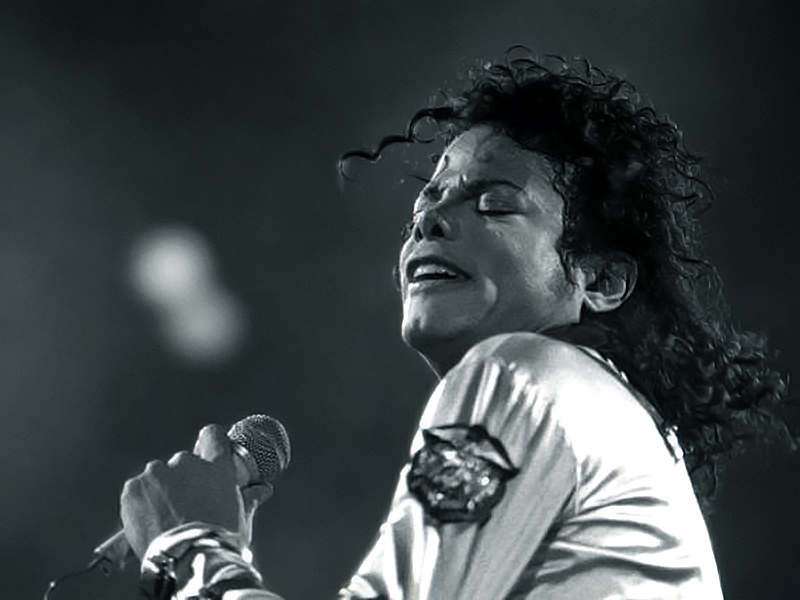
Ciara has cited Michael Jackson as being one of her biggest influences.

Ciara said that watching Destiny's Child and Janet Jackson perform on television inspired her to pursue a career in music, and cites Jackson and her brother Michael as her biggest inspirations. Ciara spoke of Michael Jackson's legacy, "Whenever someone asks me who inspires me to do what I do, I always say Michael. That's it for me. He's everything to me. He's really a part of the reason why. He's going to be remembered in so many ways for me. I feel it's important for me to continue to let my generation know how important he was to music."

Ciara also cites TLC, Jodeci, Sade, Frank Sinatra, Aaliyah, and Whitney Houston as being other musical influences. Her second studio album Ciara: The Evolution (2006) was influenced by Michael Jackson, Prince, and pop singer Madonna. During the recording of her fifth self-titled album Ciara (2013), she was inspired by Al Green and Missy Elliott.

=== Stage presence, dancing, and music videos ===
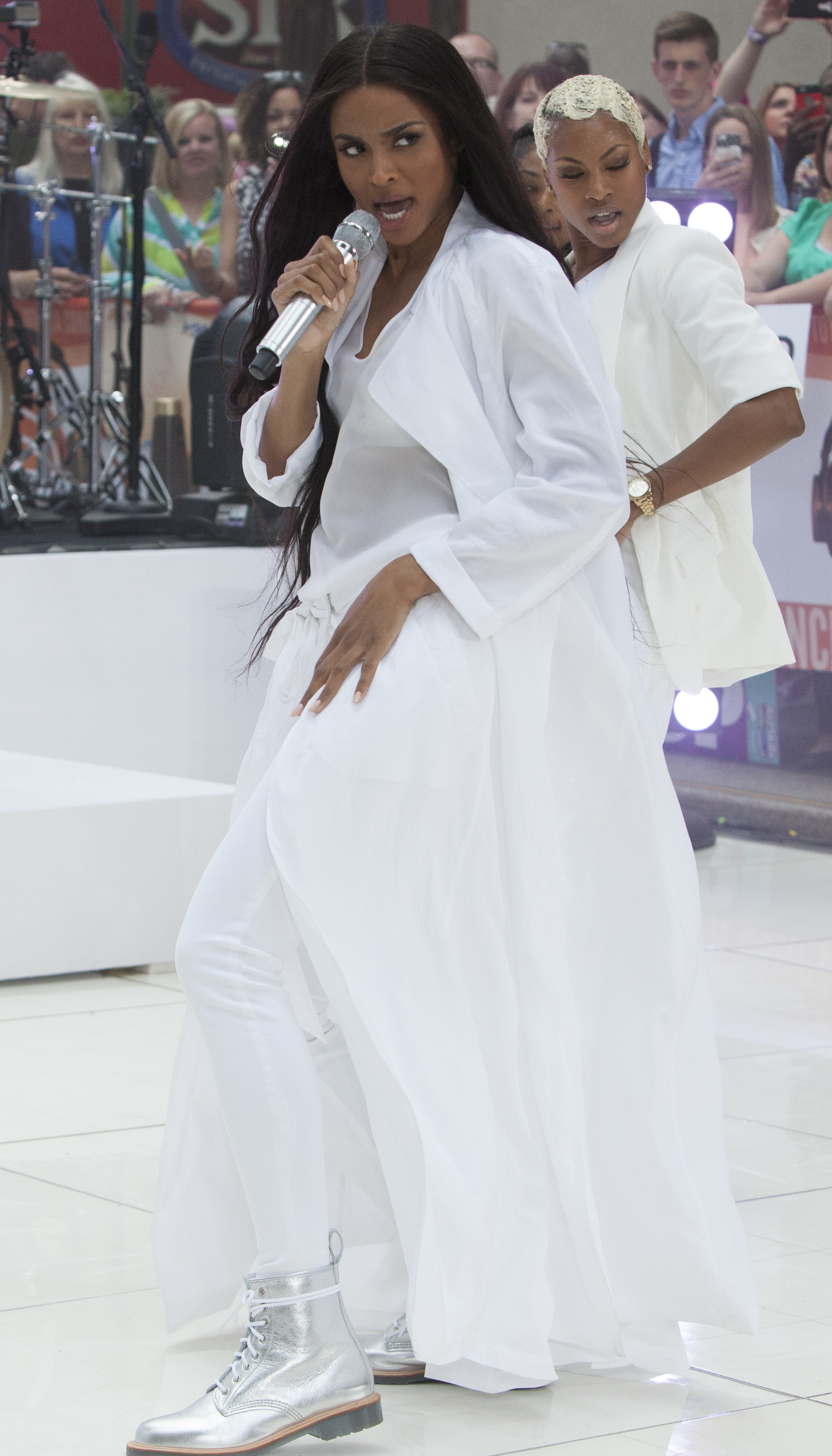
Ciara performing in Midtown Manhattan, New York, May 2015

Ciara has generally received praise for her stage presence and routines during live performances. Dalondo Moultrie of The Morning Call applauded Ciara's stage presence saying that she "put on one of the best performances I have seen yet at [Crocodile Rock]". Moultrie continued to call her dance steps "incredible", notings her "pelvic thrusts", "body bending twists", "periodic bursts of light", and commending her for being in sync with the music. In summary, he praised Ciara's live performances for their "high-energy songs, sexy dance moves, flawless vocals, and [the] top-flight light show". Sia Michel of The New York Times also praised Ciara's relentless professional presence stating: "Ciara led a squad of hip-hop dancers through stylishly choreographed routines. Striding about in a headset, she was a commanding and relentlessly professional presence." Bill White of Seattle Post-Intelligencer wrote that due to Ciara's high energy, "it hardly mattered that she was singing to backing tracks... Usually this type of performance seems cut-rate and dishonest, but Ciara, with the help of slick lighting and sharp choreography, made it work".

Ciara has gotten some criticism for her performances, typically relating to her vocals. Jon Caramanica of The New York Times gave a mixed reception of Ciara's performance ability, writing that her physical style reduced her emotional impact, and that her "lack of vocal presence guarantees that it is easier to connect with her music physically than emotionally." Vincent Jackson of The Press of Atlantic City noted Ciara's limited vocal ability when critiquing her first headlining tour, but praised her confidence and approved of her decision "to put most of her energy into her almost nonstop, aerobic dance performance".

Dance is big part of Ciara's artistry and music videos. Writing for The Guardian, Bim Adewunmi said "She makes music to dance to, and her videos are testament to that ... Ciara's currency as a dancer is precision and high difficulty. Her body becomes a sort of human syncopated beat – an urgent thing, parts moving seemingly independently but all working to a greater good. On a purely technical level, her dancing is damn near untouchable". Ciara's dancing is generally praised and she's often considered one of the best or most emulable dancers in music. Ciara's dance ability has been compared to Michael and Janet Jackson. Her dancing is often described as sexy, energetic, and precise. Ciara is noted for her often tomboyish dance aesthetic and androgynous choreography, particularly in her videos for 1, 2 Step and Like A Boy. Ciara's style of dancing is generally street, but she has also done ballroom and step in her videos and performances. Ciara also did an interpretive dance routine in pointe shoes for her I Bet music video, though her use of the shoes prompted some backlash from the ballet community.

=== Alter ego ===
"Super C is a character that people will learn more about on this record. That is my alter ego. Super C doesn't hold back. She is definitely aggressive. She goes hard. Super C can do some magical and funky things. She works hard. She dances to the 10th power. She does everything to the 10th power."

— Ciara, speaking on her alter ego Super C.

At the time of Fantasy Ride's (2009) release, Ciara introduced her alter ego "Super C". Ciara said that Super C is her "inner strength and aggressive persona" – a futuristic, superhero-esque woman, loosely based on the robotic character Ciara portrayed in the "Go Girl" music video. Ciara described her reasoning for developing an alter ego, "There's so much negative energy in the world, especially within the blogging world, they try so hard to tear you down. [With the superhero concept] it's like, 'I refuse to let you and that negative energy tear me down or stop any blessing that I know is there for me.' That's when the inner superhero comes out."

== Legacy ==
With the release of her debut single "Goodies", Ciara was dubbed the Princess of Crunk or the First Lady of Crunk&B. In the early to mid-2000s, "Goodies" along with other crunk music hits like "Get Low", "Yeah!" and "Freek-a-Leek" produced by Lil Jon climbed to the Top 10 of the Billboard Hot 100 charts. "Yeah!" and "Goodies" were the first tracks to introduce the substyle of crunk music and contemporary R&B, called crunk&B, to the public. Both of those tracks (performed by Usher and Ciara, respectively) were the top mainstream hits of 2004. Since then, crunk&B has been one of the most popular genres of sung African-American music along with electropop, the genre that replaced crunk and crunk&B on the charts in 2008. "Goodies" spent seven weeks at number 1 on the Billboard Hot 100, becoming the longest-running number 1 debut single by a female artist since 1977.

The album's lead single's success exemplified urban music's commercial dominance during the early 2000s, which featured massive crossover success on the Billboard charts by R&B and hip hop artists. In 2004, all 12 songs that topped the Billboard Hot 100 were African-American recording artists and accounted for 80% of the number 1 R&B hits that year. Along with Usher's streak of singles, Top 40 radio and both pop and R&B charts were topped by OutKast's "Hey Ya!", Snoop Dogg's "Drop It Like It's Hot", Terror Squad's "Lean Back", and Ciara's "Goodies". Chris Molanphy of The Village Voice later remarked that "by the early 2000s, urban music was pop music."

Ciara is considered to be "one of the most reliable suppliers" of beat-driven party music and the female face of crunk. Her debut album has been credited with helping "return R&B to Atlanta" and setting the standard for a new generation of R&B singers. Many female R&B and K-pop acts have had their image or style of music compared to Ciara's. Ciara peaked commercially in the mid-2000s, but she continued releasing hit songs in the 2010s. Billboard writer Natalie Weiner said that Ciara's 2013 hit "Body Party" was "one of [her] biggest and most critically acclaimed songs". It was certified double platinum in the U.S. and received numerous accolades. Ciara's 2015 single "I Bet" also went platinum in the U.S. Pitchfork journalist Katherine St. Asaph took note of Ciara's longevity, and responded to her reemergence in 2018:

"Ciara's "Goodies" came out almost 15 years ago. That's a testament to just how improbably resilient Ciara's career has been. Though she's never quite regained that initial "princess of crunk-n-B" level of mainstream stardom, she has sustained a cult fanbase and delivered a remarkably consistent run of songs to back it up.

Ciara's viral 2018 hit "Level Up" was likely the most saturated hit single of her career. Along with the wildly popular #LevelUp dance challenge that accompanied, the song was pushed to the forefront of Arizona politician Mark Kelly's winning campaign for the senate. The song is also noted for helping to bring Jersey and Baltimore club music to the mainstream, with the former being incorporated into its production. Ciara's music in general is popular and influential amongst club and underground music producers, with many remixes sampling her voice gaining popularity over the years. Canadian underground producer Jacques Greene was convinced to prioritize his music career after his song "Another Girl", which leaned on her vocals, gained traction. Latin R&B artist Rauw Alejandro admired Ciara early in his career because her music was 'club-friendly' and 'ripe for remixing'.

Ciara has been credited with elevating the standard of dance, choreography, and visual art in her respective generation, and is regarded as an icon within the fields of dance, entertainment, and R&B for her contributions. According to The Fader, Ciara positioned herself as a "tomboyish, androgynous alternative" to her peers and the gender-swapping looks from her "Like A Boy" video both predates similar efforts from artists like Beyoncé and Lady Gaga, and made gender-swapping "cool" for female popstars. The publication also said her dance videos created a template for artists like Tinashe and raised discussion on female sexuality before feminism became more prominent in the music industry. On July 28, 2024, Ciara was honored with her own official day in Atlanta.

Ciara has been cited as a musical influence or inspiration by many artists, including Ari Lennox, Baby Tate, Chloe × Halle, DaniLeigh, Dawn Richard, Dua Lipa, Flo, Girls' Generation, Grimes, Haim, Iza, Jackson Wang, Jesy Nelson, Jhené Aiko, Kehlani, Keke Palmer, Kyla, LaTocha Scott, Latto, Layton Greene, Lil Mama, Masego, Normani, Rauw Alejandro, Scott Hoying, Tate McRae, Taylor Swift, Tierra Whack, Tinashe, Victoria Monét, and 2NE1's Minzy. Ciara's public relationships have inspired K. Michelle and Summer Walker to release tracks titled "Ciara's Prayer".

== Personal life ==
Ciara and rapper Bow Wow started dating in 2004 and were engaged to be married, but split in 2006. In 2013, Ciara was engaged to rapper Future, with whom she has a son, born in May 2014. She ended their engagement in August 2014.

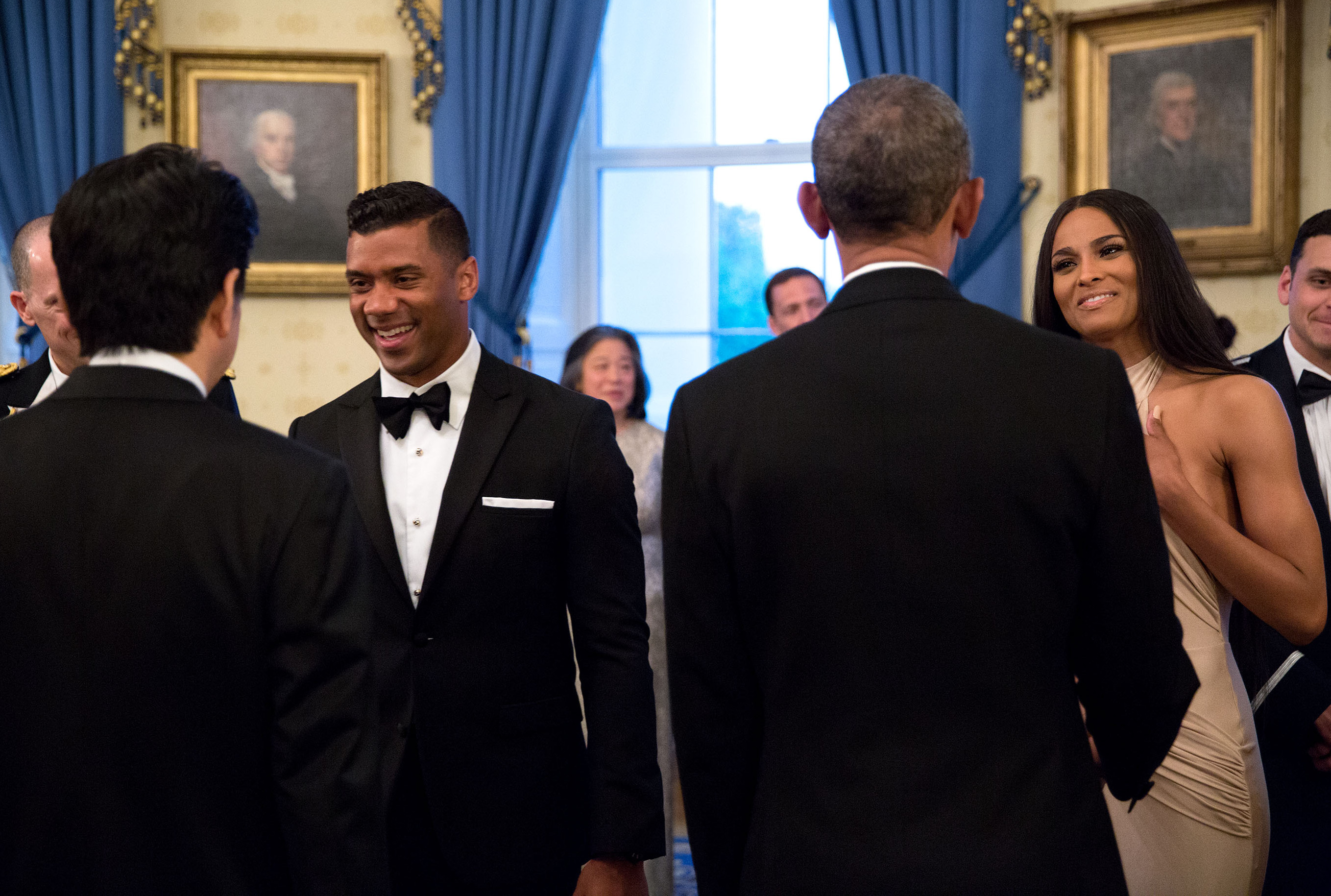
Ciara and Russell Wilson, her husband, meeting President Barack Obama and Shinzō Abe at the White House, April 2015

Ciara began dating NFL quarterback Russell Wilson in early 2015. On March 11, 2016, the couple announced their engagement. They were married on July 6 at Peckforton Castle in Cheshire East, England. Ciara took Wilson's last name when they wed. She and Wilson have three children, born in 2017, 2020 and 2023 respectively. On September 6, 2026, Ciara announced that she is expecting their fourth child, her fifth.

Ciara identifies as being a Christian. On July 26, 2025, she received Beninese citizenship.

== Other ventures ==
=== Business ===
Ciara became the face of Jay-Z's Rocawear clothing line and spokesperson for the women campaign titled "I Will Not Lose", which debuted in the summer of 2007. In the October issue of Vibe Magazine, she appeared, apparently nude, on the magazine cover but claimed Vibe had airbrushed her clothes off. She told MTV News that she was hurt by the photos and was quite shocked when she finally got her hands on the month's issue. She later confirmed that she was in fact clothed.

In 2009, Ciara signed a multimillion-dollar deal with the modeling agency Wilhelmina Models. After signing the deal, she has been in many magazine spreads. In addition to that, she also has her eyes set on beginning a new clothing line. In June 2008, she was in talks with the department store Steve & Barry's to create an affordable clothing line, but it never happened. On November 9, 2009, it was announced that Ciara would be modeling in the German edition of Vogue. During that time, it was also announced that Ciara would be the new face of a major multimedia ad campaign for Verizon's smartphone the LG Chocolate Touch. Ciara filmed a commercial for the campaign, which features her dancing to her 2009 single, "Work". In March 2010, it was officially confirmed and announced that Ciara was the spokesperson in the new ad campaign for Adidas Originals. A commercial for the campaign was released the same month, featuring numerous other celebrities.

On May 12, 2016, it was announced that Ciara signed a modeling contract with IMG. Later that year, she became a Global Brand Ambassador for the cosmetics giant Revlon. In August 2019, she and her husband, Russell Wilson, became part of the ownership group of Seattle Sounders FC in Major League Soccer. In 2020, along with Wilson and entrepreneur and mentor Christine Day, she founded the fashion house The House of LR&C, combining the Good Man Brand, LITA by Ciara and Human Nation collections. In 2021, Ciara releases the Dare To Roam collection of recycled plastic backpacks and bags. A year later, The House of LR&C received B Corp status.

Ciara and her husband, own the television entertainment, advertising, and film production company Why Not You Productions, which has been affiliated with Amazon Prime Video since 2021. In October 2021, Ciara has joined Caribbean rum brand Ten To One Rum as an investor and co-owner. Ciara will be responsible for marketing, creative, and business development, as well as strategic alliances, in her new position.

In September 2021, Ciara and Wilson announced that they were writing a children's book called Why Not You? (Random House, 2022) to help kids pursue their dreams. The book, cowritten with JaNay Brown-Wood and released on March 1, 2022, received a starred review from School Library Journal and was a New York Times bestseller. Later in August, Ciara announced the launch of her skincare line, On A Mission, set for mid-September.

=== Philanthropy ===
In September 2008, Ciara contributed to the song "Just Stand Up!" with fifteen other female artists, who shared the stage to perform the song live on September 5, 2008, during the "Stand Up to Cancer" television special. The proceeds from the single were given to the fundraiser. The television special helped raise $100 million for cancer research. In 2009, Ciara became the face of Dosomething.org's "Do Something 101" campaign to raise school supplies for those in need at the start of the school year. She filmed a public service announcement to endorse the campaign.

In December 2017, Ciara joined her husband's nonprofit 'Why Not You' Foundation as a board director. Through the foundation, she would eventually open a charter school called Why Not You Academy in June 2021 following an announcement eight months prior. They would also partner with the NFL Players Association and Goalsetter to open checking accounts for students at Denny International Middle School with a donation of $35,000 in May 2021. Ciara later partnered with the Black Women's Health Imperative and Hologic's Project Health Equality on their collaborative 'Cerving Confidence' campaign to raise awareness about the disproportionate effects of cervical cancer on black women. Amid the COVID-19 pandemic, Ciara donated one million meals to Food Lifeline to help the Puget Sound Region.

In December 2025, Ciara and Wilson donated $3 million to Mount Sinai Karvis Children's Hospital in New York City to help fund a new therapeutic play and creative arts space for patients. The same month, the couple donated $500,000 through their Why Not You Foundation to support food access initiatives across Atlanta, with a focus on underserved neighborhoods in southwest Atlanta.

== Discography ==
- Goodies (2004)
- Ciara: The Evolution (2006)
- Fantasy Ride (2009)
- Basic Instinct (2010)
- Ciara (2013)
- Jackie (2015)
- Beauty Marks (2019)
- CiCi (2025)

== Tours ==
Headlining

- Ciara: Live in Concert (2006)
- Jackie Tour (2015)
- Beauty Marks Tour (2019)

Co-headlining

- Screamfest '07 (with T.I.) (2007)
- Jay-Z & Ciara Live (with Jay-Z) (2009)

Supporting act

- Harajuku Lovers Tour 2005 (Gwen Stefani) (2005)
- Good Girl Gone Bad Tour (Rihanna) (2007)
- The Circus Starring Britney Spears (Britney Spears) (2009)
- 24K Magic World Tour (Bruno Mars) (2018)
- Out of This World: The Missy Elliott Experience Tour (Missy Elliott) (2024)

== Filmography ==
- All You've Got (2006)
- Mama, I Want to Sing! (2012)
- The Color Purple (2023)
- The Devil Wears Prada 2 (2026)

== See also ==
- List of artists who reached number one in the United States
- List of dancers
