= Goodies (Ciara album) =

2004 studio album by Ciara

Studio album by Ciara
- Released: September 28, 2004
- Recorded: 2002–2004
- Genres: Hip-hop; crunk&B; R&B
- Length: 50:03
- Labels: Jive; Music Line; Sho'nuff; LaFace; Zomba
- Producers: Lil Jon; Robert Kelly; Dre & Vidal; Bangladesh; Flash Technology; French; Adonis Shropshire

Ciara chronology
Goodies (2004)	Ciara: The Evolution (2006)

Singles from Goodies
- 1. "Goodies" Released: June 8, 2004; 2. "1, 2 Step" Released: November 1, 2004; 3. "Oh" Released: March 18, 2005; 4. "And I" Released: August 15, 2005

Goodies is the debut studio album by American singer Ciara. It was released on September 28, 2004, via Jive Records, Music Line Entertainment, Jazze Pha's Sho'nuff Records and LaFace Records. After writing songs for several established acts, Ciara's talents were noticed by Jazze Pha, and she began to work on what became Goodies. The album's conception came through the title track, produced by Lil Jon and created as a female crunk counterpart to other singles produced by Lil Jon such as Usher's "Yeah!" and Petey Pablo's "Freek-a-Leek". Ciara worked with additional writers and producers on the album, including Jazze Pha, Bangladesh, R. Kelly, Johntá Austin, Sean Garrett, and Keri Hilson, among others.

With Goodies, Ciara was referred to as the "Princess" or "First Lady of Crunk&B". The album uses dance music while utilizing pop, R&B, and hip-hop influences. Critics gave the album positive to mixed reviews, commending the "Goodies"-esque songs, while deeming others as unoriginal and noting Ciara's limited vocal abilities. Most critics compared the work to late singer Aaliyah, and also said it had qualities of Destiny's Child.

The album was a commercial success. In the United States, the album debuted at number three on the US Billboard 200, selling 124,750 copies in its opening week. It was later certified quadruple platinum by the Recording Industry Association of America (RIAA), and has sold over 5 million copies worldwide. The album also fared well internationally, being certified platinum by the Music Canada (MC) and gold by the British Phonographic Industry (BPI). Goodies earned Ciara two Grammy nominations at the 48th Grammy Awards including Best New Artist and Best Rap/Sung Collaboration for "1, 2 Step" in 2006.

A 20th Anniversary vinyl edition of the album was released on September 27, 2024.

== Background ==
In her mid-teens, Ciara formed the all-girl group Hearsay with two of her friends. The group recorded demos, but as time went on, they began to have differences and eventually parted ways. Despite this setback, Ciara was still determined to reach her goal and signed a publishing deal as a songwriter. After leaving the group Hearsay, Texas native Ciara earned a writing job via her manager, for Atlanta's Tricky Stewart and The-Dream's RedZone Entertainment, penning songs for Mýa and Fantasia among others. According to Ciara, no one believed in her dreams of hearing her own music on the radio until she met producer Jazze Pha in 2002. Within five months of meeting her, Pha signed her to his Sho'nuff label and they had already recorded five tracks. About Ciara, Jazze Pha said, "What was really lacking is the Janet Jackson, high-energy dance [music]. Ciara fills that void. She's pretty, she can dance, she can write music, and kids love her. Everyone loves her."

== Recording ==
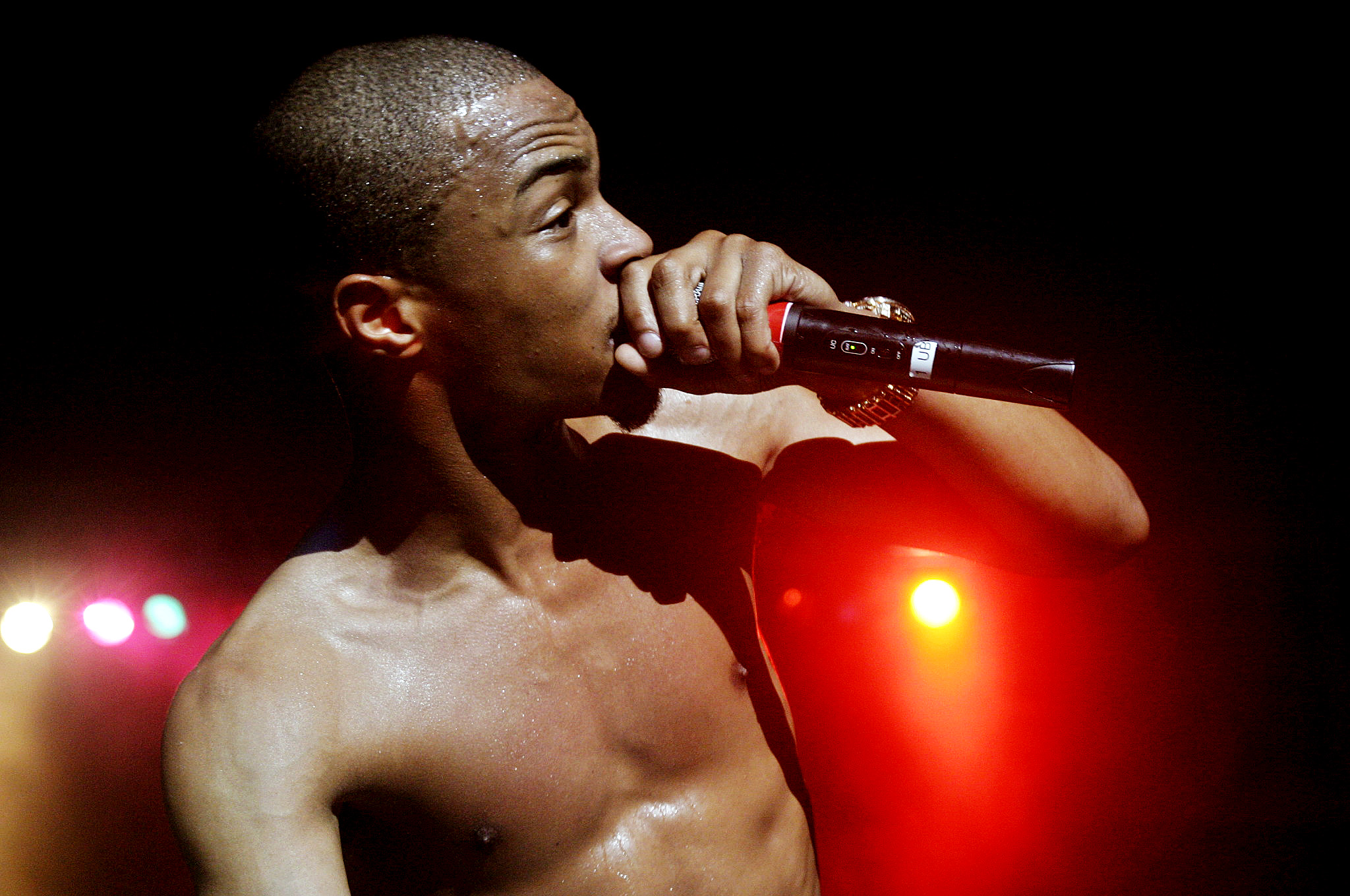
Rapper T.I. was one of the many Atlanta-based musicians that Ciara collaborated with on the album.

After graduating from Riverdale High School in Riverdale, Georgia in 2003, she was signed by LaFace Records executive, L.A. Reid, whom she was introduced to by Jazze Pha. She began production on her debut album later that year. Recording sessions for the album took place at Chocolate Factory, Chicago, IL; Circle House Studios, Miami, FL; Darp Studios, Atlanta, GA; Doppler Studios, Atlanta, GA; Futuristic Recording Studios, Atlanta, GA; Ground Breaking Studios, Atlanta, GA; Hit Factory Criteria, Miami, FL; Hitco, Atlanta, GA; Patchwerk Recordings, Atlanta, GA; Phoenix Ave. Studios, Atlanta, GA; Sony Music Studios, New York, NY; Studio 609 Recordings, Philadelphia, PA; The Studio, Philadelphia, PA.

In early 2004, Ciara wrote a demo with record producer Sean Garrett, co-writer of Usher's crunk hit "Yeah." After hearing a demo, crunk producer Lil Jon, who also produced and was featured on "Yeah", began to work on the full record, to have it released on LaFace. Originally, Ciara was reluctant to work with the track produced by Lil Jon, reportedly disliking crunk music at first. However, she decided to use the song to go against the grain and deliver lyrics in contrast of female promiscuity lines delivered by fellow female artists. To give her a title to stand out, Lil Jon dubbed Ciara as the "Princess of Crunk&B." Dubbed the female counterpart to "Yeah" and fellow crunk hit "Freek-a-Leek" by Petey Pablo, Laface looked to capitalize on the success of the previous songs. In addition to working with Jazze Pha, who produced most of the album, Lil Jon, and Garrett, she worked with several other Atlanta-based writers and producers including Bangladesh, Johntá Austin, Jasper Cameron, and others, while featuring collaborations from Atlanta's T.I. and Ludacris. R&B singer R. Kelly wrote and produced a track.

When talking about the album's theme, Ciara said it was universal, stating, "It's about everybody. You'll have songs with different emotions, happy, sad, 'my heart is broken.' What everybody goes through." On her success with the preluding title track, Ciara said, "I'm very content right now. I take everything a day at a time. Every time I hear good news, I'm shouting out, 'Praise God.' Everybody around me is so excited, I still haven't got it. I haven't really felt it like they're feeling it for me."

== Composition ==
The album consists of bouncy dance music mixed with crunk, combined with either R&B, pop or hip hop music. The ballads on the set utilize Ciara's breathy vocals, as the uptempo pieces. Lyrical content varies on the album. Songs like "Goodies" issue a message of female empowerment and abstinence, and this is contradicted as she hints at teasing sex. Slant Magazine compared this to Britney Spears-esque "layer of tease to the mature" in her early work. Utilizing influences from 80's dance music, qualities of the work of Destiny's Child and Aaliyah are evident.

"Goodies" is heavily influenced by male counterpart crunk song "Yeah" and also has been compared to Kelis's "Milkshake." The song makes use of a repeated whistle, "faux operated vocals" in parts and a western guitar riff near the end. "1, 2 Step," which continues the club music theme, is built around a simple dance and features Missy Elliott in a pas de deux. and according to Mike Pattensden of The Times, "owes plenty to classic New York electro." "Oh," a downtempo song, features a heavy bassline and has been called "brooding electronic grind," and, according to Dorian Lynskey of The Guardian, "sounds like R&B reimagined by Gary Numan." "Pick Up the Phone" was described as a rip-off of Aaliyah's "Rock the Boat" by Sal Cinquemani of Slant Magazine. "Next to You," written by R. Kelly, is part of the album's second half of ballads, and was said to capture "Ciara's youthful indecisiveness." "Hotline" features a "funky clap" and beatboxing.

== Singles ==
Goodies' lead single, the title track, featuring Petey Pablo, was released on June 8, 2004. Conceived as a crunk female counterpart to Usher's "Yeah," the lyrical content goes against the grain, speaking of abstinence, rejecting advances because "the goodies will stay in the jar". Critics hailed it as an "anthem of the summer" and one of the best singles of the year, complementing its dance-feel and beat, and the irony of the "clever" lyrics. The single performed well worldwide, topping the charts in Canada, the United States and the United Kingdom, and charting in the top ten of other charts, receiving Platinum certification in the United States. The music video shot for the song features Ciara partying with friends at a car wash. "1, 2 Step", featuring Missy Elliott, was released as the second single, incorporating a hip-hop and dance-pop feel, deriving influences from 1980s electro music. While topping the charts in Canada, it additionally appeared in the top ten of six other countries, and was certified Platinum or Gold in multiple regions. The accompanying music video features Ciara and others performing the "1, 2 Step" dance. The song was nominated for Best Rap/Sung Collaboration at the 48th Annual Grammy Awards.

"Oh", featuring Ludacris, proclaimed as a love song to Atlanta, was released as the album's third single on March 5, 2005. Carrying a slow, dark tone, critics noted "Oh" as a standout track from Goodies. The song performed well worldwide, appearing the top ten of seven charts, and certified either Platinum or Gold in multiple regions. The song's music video takes place at a block party, and was nominated for Best R&B Video at the 2005 MTV Video Music Awards. In May 2005, Ciara mentioned that the album's fourth single would be "Thug Style" or "Pick Up the Phone" - or maybe even "And I". The final choice, "And I", was released on August 30, 2005, and only managed to peak at ninety-six on the Billboard Hot 100. The music video for "And I" is loosely based on the 1992 film, The Bodyguard, and NBA player Carmelo Anthony portrayed Ciara's love interest. In December 2005, The Washington Post reported that "Hotline" would be the album's fifth single, but the release failed to materialize.

== Critical reception ==
Professional ratings
Review scores
Source	Rating
AllMusic	3.5/5 stars
Blender	3/5 stars
Entertainment Weekly	B
The Guardian	2/5 stars
MTV Asia	7/10
Now	3/5 Ns
PopMatters	6/10 stars
Slant Magazine	2.5/5 stars
The Times	3/5 stars
USA Today	2.5/4 stars

Critics gave Goodies generally positive but mixed reviews, praising its standout singles and production while noting inconsistency and suggesting Ciara had potential but needed further refinement to match top R&B peers. Raymond Fiore of Entertainment Weekly gave the album a B and commented, "If Aaliyah had lived to make another CD, it might have sounded like Goodies," adding that other album cuts "prove she's no one-track pony." Noting the singles "Goodies," "1, 2 Step," and "Oh" as standout tracks, Jason Birchmeier from Allmusic awarded the album three and a half out of five stars. Steve Jones of USA Today wrote, "The voice doesn't blow you away, but as with Goodies, she occasionally takes a lyrically intriguing, offbeat path. Though not every song is a goodie, she does have a few treats in store." Jason Richards from Now concluded thath "Ciara successfully carries the torch lit by Usher's "Yeah!," her lissom vocals bouncing over high-end synth zaps and digital handclaps provided by her handlers Lil' Jon and Jazze Pha." Jalylah Burrell of PopMatters commented that "Goodies is nothing new, but it is executed well."

Although he noted the album was not flawless, Azeem Ahmad of musicOMH said, "The talent is obviously there but if we are to carry out Ciara's wish of forgetting about "the other chicks" then there's some fine-tuning needed. For now there's no direct threat to any other hip-hop divas, but the void left by Aaliyah is still there for someone to try and fill. There's no reason why Ciara can't one day hold her own with the best." Although pointing out the flaws of Goodies, Dorian Lynskey of The Guardian said, "Ciara has no conviction as a sweet-talker but her disconnected style clicks perfectly with the cold, clinical (in a good way) hits." Mike Pattenden of The Times said, "Goodies has some tasty treats, but they're all stacked on top of the jar," commenting that Ciara's "whispery, girlish voice that is often relegated to the background by stronger performers, suggesting she is little more than a pretty mouthpiece for Jon and his posse of producers." Slant Magazine's Sal Cinquemani compared it to the work to Aaliyah, stating some of it was not up to par with the late singer, but complimented the title track-esque tracks.

== Commercial performance ==
Goodies debuted at number three on the US Billboard 200 chart, selling 124,750 copies in its first week. The album also topped the Top R&B/Hip-Hop Albums chart, before being dethroned by the Usher's Confessions. In its second week, the album dropped to number 10 on the chart, selling 66,000 more copies. The album spent a total of 71 weeks on the chart. On October 10, 2006, the album was triple platinum by the Recording Industry Association of America (RIAA) for shipments of over three million copies in the United States. As of June 2010, the album has sold 2.7 million copies in the US.

In Canada, the album debuted at number 35 on the Canadian Albums Chart. The album was eventually certified platinum by Music Canada for sales of over 100,000 copies in Canada.

In the United Kingdom, the album charted at 26 in on the UK Albums Chart, and spent 20 weeks on the chart. The album was certified gold by the British Phonographic Industry (BPI) for sales of over 100,000 copies in the UK. The album also charted moderately in other countries, including the top 40 on the New Zealand Albums Chart and Irish Albums Chart.

== Legacy and vinyl reissue ==
Following the release of her debut single "Goodies", Ciara was dubbed the Princess of Crunk&B by various media outlets. In the early and mid-2000s, "Goodies" joined other crunk music hits produced by Lil Jon in climbing to the Top 10 of the Billboard Hot 100 charts, along with "Get Low", "Yeah!" and "Freek-a-Leek". "Yeah!" and "Goodies" were the first tracks to introduce the substyle of crunk music and contemporary R&B, called crunk&B, to the public. Both of those tracks (performed by Usher and Ciara, respectively) were essential pop hits of 2004. Since then, crunk&B has been one of the most popular genres of sung African-American music, along with electropop, the genre that replaced crunk and crunk&B in the charts in 2008. After the album's lead single reached the summit of the US Billboard Hot 100, it spent seven weeks at number one, becoming the longest-running number-one debut single by a female artist since 1977.

The album's lead singles success exemplified urban music's commercial dominance during the early 2000s, which featured massive crossover success on the Billboard charts by R&B and hip hop artists. In 2004, all 12 songs that topped the Billboard Hot 100 were from African-American recording artists which also accounted for 80% of the number-one R&B hits that year. Along with Usher's streak of singles, Top 40 radio and both pop and R&B charts were topped by OutKast's "Hey Ya!", Snoop Dogg's "Drop It Like It's Hot", Terror Squad's "Lean Back", and Ciara's "Goodies". Chris Molanphy of The Village Voice later remarked that "by the early 2000s, urban music was pop music."

The work helped Ciara earn several nominations, including Best New Artist at the 48th Annual Grammy Awards. Several Goodies singles received several nominations at different ceremonies, which included "1, 2 Step" being nominated at the 48th Grammy Awards for Best Rap/Sung Collaboration. The song "1, 2 Step" from the album Goodies has received numerous awards, including both "Best Performed Songs in the ASCAP Repertory" and "Most Performed Songs" from the American Society of Composers, Authors and Publishers, "Best Collaboration" from the BET Awards, and "Best Dance Cut" from the Soul Train Lady of Soul Music Awards, and "Choice Music R&B/Hip Hop Track" from the Teen Choice Awards. Ciara has received nine nominations from the BET Awards, winning one of them.

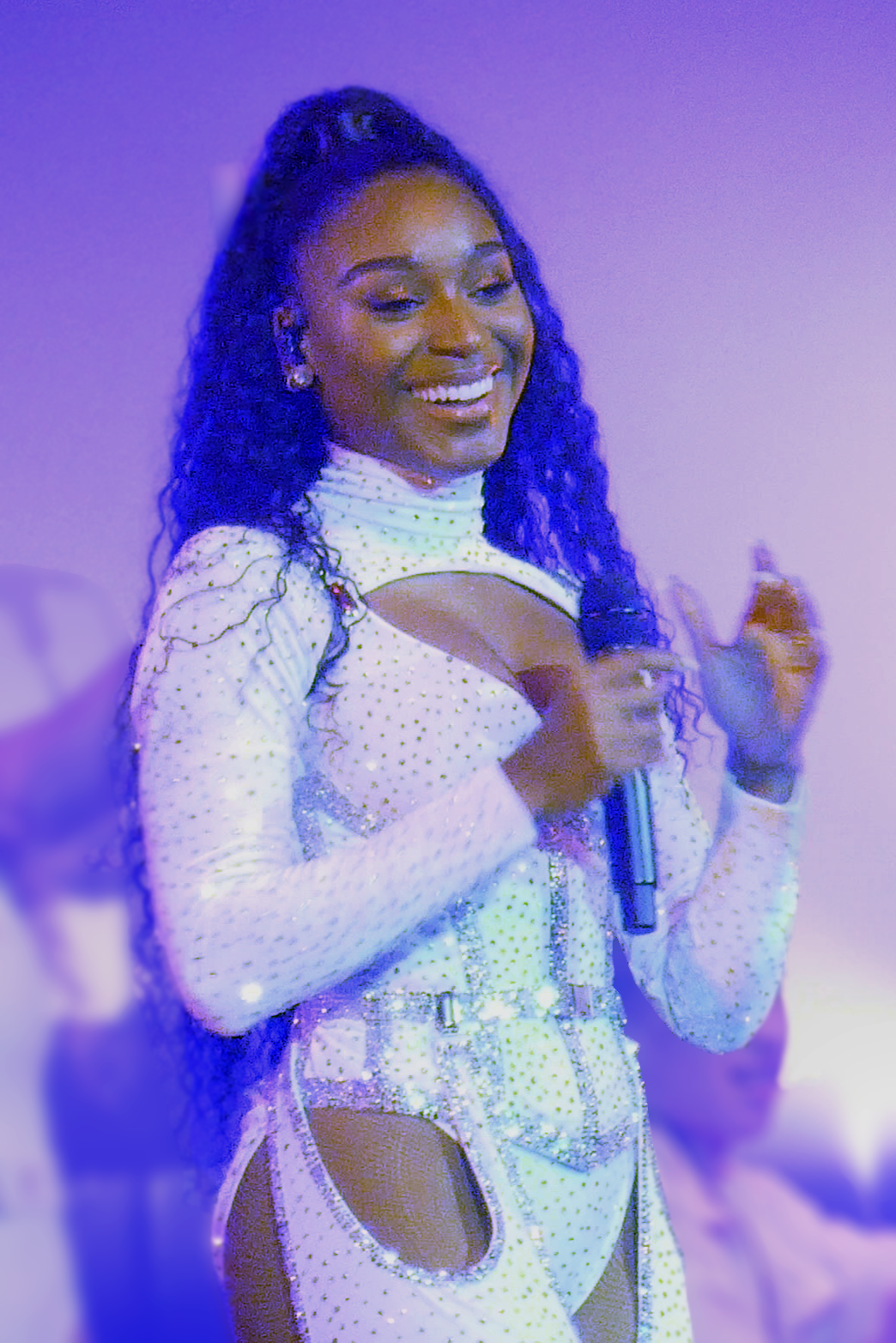
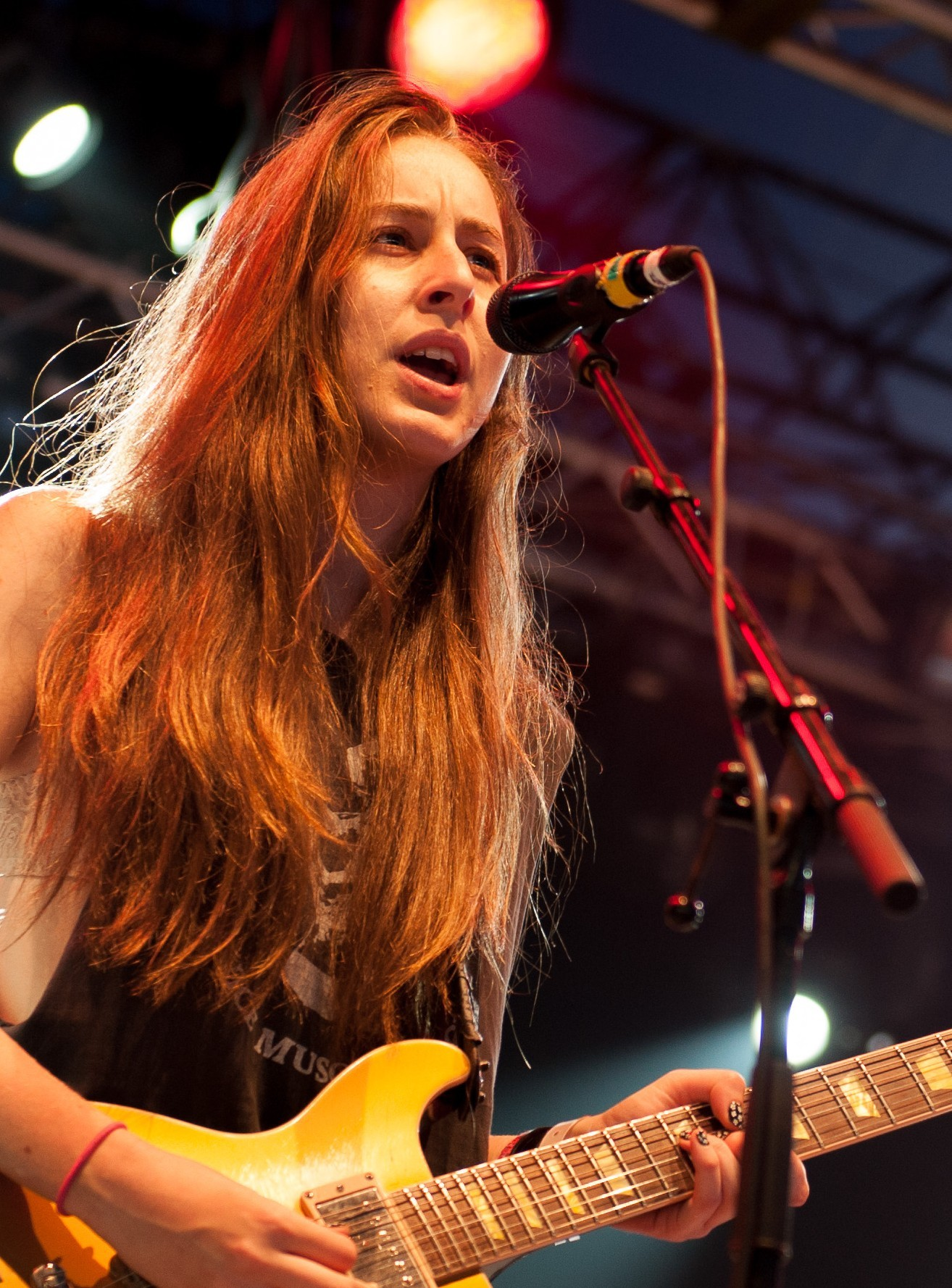
Normani (left) and Alana Haim (right) have credited singles from Goodies as an influence on their own music

In retrospect of Goodies, Bryson Paul wrote for ThisIsRnB on the album and where it placed Ciara in pop culture. "With the Crunk era at its peak, Ciara added a sexy female perspective to the gritty punk-influenced genre, and — along with the likes of fellow ATLien Usher — helped create the subgenre now aptly referred to as Crunk&B. [...] the young songstress separated herself from an all-star pack of new singers that included Rihanna, Ashanti, Nivea and the juggernaut trio, Destiny’s Child. As she rose to the top of the charts, CiCi was often compared to greats ranging as far back as Janet Jackson to the late Aaliyah". He concluded:

"Goodies is often referred to as Ciara’s best work and for good reasoning. It was with this album that the return of R&B to Atlanta was pushed further as it served as a solid follow-up to the release of Monica’s 2003 “After the Storm” and Usher’s iconic “Confessions” album that was released just months before. And at a decade and a half later, the album still resonates with today’s pop culture. The album’s vibe is one that patents its own signature choreographed flow — both physically and vocally. Displaying perfect sequence, delivery, and explosiveness thanks to the crunk-injected 808s, Goodies helped set the standard for a new era of talented R&B stars."

Rob Copsey also wrote on the album's impact for the OCC. "Ciara had immediately established herself on the global stage ... Goodies was a hit in Australia and most of Europe, earning her the dubious title a 'Princess of Crunk&B'". He continued, "16 years on, the influence of Goodies can be felt, most notably on the debut single by Normani, Motivation, on which the former Fifth Harmony singer pays homage to Goodies and several other quintessential '90s/'00s music videos in her visual".

For the album's 20th anniversary, a vinyl reissue was made available with an updated tracklist that included bonus records, a new remix of "Goodies", and omitted the R. Kelly assisted "Next to You". Various publications reported on the album's reissue and offered retrospectives, noting the album's iconic status and impact on music. In writing for the AJC, DeAsia Page called the album a "cultural touchstone" that established a "Southern-Style Standard" for R&B and hip-hop during that time period. She credited Ciara's aesthetic and success for catalyzing a Black teen dance movement, and providing a blueprint for Southern artists to achieve global stardom. Billboard further acknowledged the scarcity of Ciara's debut success amongst modern popstars in a retrospective. They noted that Ciara's commercial dominance in 2005 "set the tone" for mid-00s pop music and defined that era in popular culture.

Several recording artists have also cited singles from Goodies or the album itself as an influence or personal favorite of theirs, such as Normani, Ari Lennox, Latto, Lizzo, Kaash Paige, and Alana Haim. Megan Thee Stallion sampled "Goodies" for her song "Roc Steady" and Charli XCX interpolated 1, 2 Step for her hit song "360".

== Track listing ==
Goodies track listing
No.	Title	Writer(s)	Producer(s)	Length
1.	"Goodies" (featuring Petey Pablo)	Ciara Harris; Jonathan Smith; Sean Garrett; Craig Love; LaMarquis Jefferson	Lil Jon	3:43
2.	"1, 2 Step" (featuring Missy Elliott)	Ciara Harris; Phalon Alexander; Melissa Elliott	Jazze Pha (music); Pierre Medor (vocals)	3:23
3.	"Thug Style"	Ciara Harris; Alexander; Johntá Austin	Jazze Pha	4:25
4.	"Hotline"	Ciara Harris; Shondrae Crawford	Bangladesh	3:23
5.	"Oh" (featuring Ludacris)	Ciara Harris; Andre Harris; Vidal Davis; Christopher Bridges; Doncarlos Price	Dre & Vidal	4:16
6.	"Pick Up the Phone"	Ciara Harris; Alexander; Austin	Jazze Pha	3:48
7.	"Lookin' at You"	Ciara Harris; Alexander; Austin	Jazze Pha	3:25
8.	"Ooh Baby"	Garrett; Herman Lang; Keri Hilson	Flash Technology (music); Garrett (vocals)	3:37
9.	"Next to You" (featuring R. Kelly)	Robert Kelly	R. Kell (music); Carvin "Ransum" Haggins (vocals)	3:13
10.	"And I"	Ciara Harris; Adonis Shropshire	Adonis Shropshire	3:53
11.	"Other Chicks"	Ciara Harris; Lakiesha N. Miles; Demetrius French Spencer	French Spencer	4:21
12.	"The Title"	Ciara Harris; Jasper Cameron; Skip Scarborough	Jasper Cameron	4:21
13.	"Goodies" (Remix featuring T.I. and Jazze Pha) (bonus track)	Ciara Harris; Garrett; Smith; Love; Jefferson; Alexander; Clifford Harris	Lil Jon	4:21
Total length:				50:09

British and Japanese bonus track
No.	Title	Writer(s)	Producer(s)	Length
14.	"Crazy"	Ciara Harris; Spencer; Austin; Kevin Hicks	Spencer; Kevin Hicks	3:52
Total length:				54:01

2024 anniversary edition bonus tracks
No.	Title	Writer(s)	Producer(s)	Length
13.	"Crazy"	Ciara Harris; Spencer; Austin; Kevin Hicks	Spencer; Kevin Hicks	3:52
14.	"Represent Me"	Ciara Harris	Jazze Pha	3:22
15.	"Goodies" (2024 Dipha Barus remix)	Ciara Harris; Jonathan Smith; Sean Garrett; Craig Love; LaMarquis Jefferson	Lil Jon; Dipha Barus	3:15
Total length:				57:24

Notes

- "The Title" contains a sample from "Love Ballad", written by Skip Scarborough, as performed by L.T.D.
- "Next to You" does not appear on the 2024 anniversary edition.

== Personnel ==
Credits adapted from Liner Notes and Allmusic.

- Ciara – lead vocals (All tracks)
- Kori Anders – recording engineer (5), mixing assistant (2, 4, 12)
- Carlos Bedoya – recording engineer (2)
- Jim Bottari – recording engineer (9)
- Leslie Brathwaite – recording engineer (8), mixing (2–4, 6–8, 10–13)
- Ralph Cacciurri – recording engineer (5)
- Tom Coyne – mastering
- Mike Davis – recording engineer (4)
- Vidal Davis – mixing (5)
- Vincent Dilorenzo – recording engineer, mixing (5)
- Rodney East – additional keyboards (9)
- Missy Elliott – rap vocals (2)
- Yolonda Frederick – make-up
- Andy Gallas – music programming, recording engineer (9)
- Abel Garibaldi – music programming, recording engineer (9)
- Serban Ghenea – mixing (9)
- John Hanes – digital editing, pro-tools engineer (9)
- Andre Harris – mixing (5)
- Jazze Pha – backing vocals (2–3, 6–7), rap vocals (13), instrumentation (3, 6–7), executive producer
- LaMarquis Jefferson – bass played by (1, 13)
- Rachael Johnson – stylist
- R. Kelly – musical arrangement, background vocals (9)
- Henry "Noonie" Lee Jr. – executive producer
- Craig Love – guitar (1, 13)
- Ludacris – rap vocals (5)
- Donnie Lyle – guitar (9)
- Carlton Lynn – recording engineer (12)
- Mark Mann – photography
- Ian Mereness – recording engineer (9)
- Jason Mlodzinski – assistant
- Peter Mokran – mixing (14)
- Steve "ESP" Nowacynski – recording engineer (1, 13)
- Petey Pablo – rap vocals (1)
- Mark Pitts – A&R
- Charles Sanders – recording engineer (1, 13)
- Ray Seay – mixing (1, 13)
- Adonis Shropshire – recording engineer (10)
- Shereese Slate – hair stylist
- Jonathan "Lil Jon" Smith – additional rap vocals, production, mixing (1, 13)
- Nico Solis – recording engineer (4, 13), mixing (13)
- French Spencer – instrumentation (11)
- Vern Spencer – recording engineer (11)
- Brian Stanley – recording engineer (1, 13), mixing (1)
- Shakir Stewart – A&R
- Anthony "T.A." Tate – executive producer
- Sam Thomas – recording engineer (2, 4–5)
- T.I. – rap vocals (13)
- Mike Tsarsati – mixing assistant (5)
- Courtney Walter – art direction, design
- Nathan Wheeler – assistant
- Cory Williams – mixing assistant (3, 6–8, 10–11)
- Phillana Williams – marketing
- Arnold Wolfe – recording engineer (3, 6–7)
- Keri Hilson – writer, background vocals (8)
- Sean Garrett – vocal production (1, 13)

== Charts ==
=== Weekly charts ===
Weekly chart performance for Goodies
Chart (2004–2005)	Peak position
Australian Albums (ARIA)	46
Australian Urban Albums (ARIA)	11
Belgian Albums (Ultratop Flanders)	88
Canadian Albums (Nielsen SoundScan)	20
Canadian R&B Albums (Nielsen SoundScan)	9
Dutch Albums (Album Top 100)	79
French Albums (SNEP)	65
German Albums (Offizielle Top 100)	67
Irish Albums (IRMA)	36
Japanese Albums (Oricon)	14
New Zealand Albums (RMNZ)	29
Scottish Albums (Official Charts)	48
Swiss Albums (Schweizer Hitparade)	52
Taiwanese Albums (Five Music)	2
UK Albums (Official Charts)	26
UK R&B Albums (Official Charts)	5
US Billboard 200	3
US Top R&B/Hip-Hop Albums (Billboard)	1

=== Year-end charts ===
2004 year-end chart performance for Goodies
Chart (2004)	Position
US Billboard 200	177
US Top R&B/Hip-Hop Albums (Billboard)	77

2005 year-end chart performance for Goodies
Chart (2005)	Position
US Billboard 200	19
US Top R&B/Hip-Hop Albums (Billboard)	12

== Certifications ==
Region	Certification	Certified units/sales
Canada (Music Canada)	Platinum	100,000^{^}
Ireland (IRMA)	Gold	7,500^{^}
Japan (RIAJ)	Gold	100,000^{^}
New Zealand (RMNZ)	2× Platinum	30,000^{‡}
United Kingdom (BPI)	Gold	100,000^{^}
United States (RIAA)	4× Platinum	4,000,000^{‡}
^{^} Shipments figures based on certification alone.^{‡} Sales+streaming figures based on certification alone.

== See also ==
- List of Billboard number-one R&B albums of 2004 (US)
