= Oh (Ciara song) =

2005 song by Ciara

Single by Ciara featuring Ludacris

from the album Goodies
- Released: March 1, 2005
- Recorded: 2004
- Studio: Studio 609 Recordings (Philadelphia, Pennsylvania); Doppler (Atlanta, Georgia); Patchwerk (Atlanta, Georgia)
- Genre: Crunk&B; R&B
- Length: 4:16
- Label: LaFace; Sho'nuff
- Songwriters: Ciara Harris; Christopher Bridges; Andre Harris; Vidal Davis; Doncarlos Price
- Producer: Dre & Vidal

Ciara singles chronology
| "1, 2 Step" (2004) | "Oh" (2005) | "Lose Control" (2005) |

Ludacris singles chronology
| "Number One Spot" (2005) | "Oh" (2005) | "The Potion" (2005) |

Music video
- "Oh" on YouTube

"Oh" is a song by American singer, Ciara who wrote the song with Ludacris (who features on the song), Andre Harris, and Vidal Davis. "Oh" was produced by Harris and Davis, who work as Dre & Vidal. The song was released on March 1, 2005, as the third single from her debut album, Goodies. The downtempo R&B song features hip-hop elements and a heavy bassline, and can be seen as an anthem to her hometown, Atlanta, Georgia. Ciara sings about the many things the city has to offer, while Ludacris raps the third verse.

The song was well received by music critics, who praised the song's beat, specifically noting its radio-friendliness. It won an award at the 2006 ASCAP Awards for Most Performed Songs with the two previous singles from Goodies, "Goodies" featuring Petey Pablo and "1, 2 Step" featuring Missy Elliott. The song also took home the award for Choice Music Make-Out Song at the 2005 Teen Choice Awards and for Coolest Collabo at the 2006 Vibe Awards. The song was listed at number 127 on Pitchfork Media's Top 500 Songs of the 2000s. The song was placed at number 72 on Slant's The 100 Best Singles of the Aughts. It, along with other songs on Goodies, helped earn Ciara a nomination for Best New Artist at the 48th Annual Grammy Awards.

The single was a commercial success, peaking at number two in the United States, becoming her third consecutive top three hit. It also peaked within the top ten of charts in many international markets, including Germany, New Zealand and the United Kingdom, and was certified platinum in the US, gold in Australia and silver in the UK. The song was accompanied by a music video, which showed the singer dancing with friends in the streets of Atlanta, as well as in an arena and a parking garage.

== Composition and meaning ==
In 2004, Ciara was in the recording studio with Dre & Vidal. She decided to take the beat back to Atlanta, Georgia. It took Ciara one week to complete the lyrics for the love song to Atlanta. She quoted, "I didn't waste time and just write to any beat. If I don't like a beat, I won't work with it." Also she recalled, "I wanted to make sure that we were actually talking about Atlanta".

While composing the lyrics, Ciara spoke to her management to get Ludacris on the track and he agreed. She said, "I think Ludacris is perfect".

"Oh" is written in the key of C minor in common time with a slow tempo of 60 beats per minute.

== Critical reception ==
"Oh" received positive reviews from music critics. PopMatters described the track as "dark" and "infectious", "whose beat approximates the David Banner-constructed "Rubber Band Man" banger." MusicOMH opined that "Oh" is "far and away the album's best track" and the "ultimate cruising tune". Virgin Media wrote that it was "the album's standout track". One negative review of the song, published by The Situation, said the song was "not as strong" as other songs on the album Goodies, "as Luda's raspy vocals overpower Ciara's sweet tone."

"Oh" went on to win an award at the 2006 ASCAP Award Show for Most Performed Songs with the two previous singles from Goodies, "Goodies" featuring Petey Pablo and "1, 2 Step" featuring Missy Elliott. The song also took home the award for Choice Music Make-Out Song at the 2005 Teen Choice Awards and for Coolest Collabo at the 2006 Vibe Awards. The song was listed at number 127 on Pitchfork Media's Top 500 Songs of the 2000s.

== Chart performance ==
The song debuted at number 75 on the US Billboard Hot 100 the week of March 25, 2005, to become Ciara's third top-five single. "Oh" became Ciara's second song in a row (after "1, 2 Step") to reach a peak of number two on the chart. It also peaked at two on the Billboard Hot R&B/Hip-Hop Songs chart and at number one on the Rhythmic Top 40. The song spent a total of 33 weeks on the chart. The song also peaked number six on the Pop 100 and Mainstream Top 40. "Oh" was commissioned dance remixes. The song appeared on the Billboard Hot Dance Airplay chart, peaking at number 20. The "DJ Volume South Beach" remix appears on the bonus CD of Goodies: The Videos & More. The single was certified platinum by the Recording Industry Association of America (RIAA) for sales of over a million digital copies in the United States.

"Oh" was a hit outside the US as well. The song debuted and peaked at number four in the United Kingdom and number five for two weeks in New Zealand. The song also peaked at number seven in Australia, Germany, and Ireland. It was also a top-20 hit in Finland and Switzerland.

== Music video ==
The music video for "Oh" was directed by the Fat Cats. It begins with Ciara sitting with "little" Ciara watching a video player. The camera zooms into the video player and reveals an overview of Atlanta and scenes of Ciara and her friends at a block party in an alley. She performs the first verse and first chorus in the middle of the street, while she is surrounded by guests and their cars. There are dance sequences throughout the remainder of the video and a scene with Ciara performing on top of a car as Ludacris raps. Ciara is also "ridin' slow" in a classic model Oldsmobile. There are also cameos by Gucci Mane, Jazze Pha, and Boyz n da Hood.

Ciara described the choreography as "the real star" and "very intense". Also, Ciara quoted that she and her choreographer tried "to find the best moves that we can". The video was choreographed by Devyne Stephens. It features former dancers of Usher and MC Hammer.

"Oh" was nominated in the Best R&B Video category at the 2005 MTV Video Music Awards, but lost to Alicia Keys's "Karma".

== Formats and track listings ==
US 12-inch single

A1. "Oh" (main) – 4:16
A2. "Oh" (instrumental) – 4:16
B1. "Oh" (main) – 4:16
B2. "Oh" (acappella) – 4:16

UK CD single

1. "Oh" (album version)
2. "Oh" (Kardinal Beats radio edit)
3. "Oh" (Bimbo Jones remix)
4. "Oh" (Bimbo Jones dub)
5. "Oh" (DJ Volume 'South Beach' remix)

UK 12-inch single

A1. "Oh" (Kardinal Beats radio edit)
A2. "Oh" (album version)
A3. "Oh" (instrumental)
B1. "Oh" (Bimbo Jones remix)
B2. "Oh" (Bimbo Jones dub)

European two-track CD single

1. "Oh" (album version) – 4:16
2. "Oh" (Kardinal Beats radio edit) – 3:21

European three-track CD single

1. "Oh" (featuring Ludacris) – 4:16
2. "Oh" (featuring M. Pokora) – 3:47
3. "Oh" (Kardinal Beats radio edit) – 3:21

Australian CD single

1. "Oh" (album version)
2. "Oh" (Kardinal Beats remix)
3. "Oh" (Bimbo Jones remix)
4. "Oh" (DJ Volume 'South Beach' remix)
5. "1, 2 Step" (Phatbelly remix)

== Personnel ==
- Vocals by: Ciara and Ludacris
- Produced by: Dre & Vidal
- Recorded by: Vincent Dilorenzo at Studio 609 recordings, Philadelphia, Pennsylvania, Ralph Cacciuri and Sam Thomas at Doppler Studios, Atlanta, Georgia and Kori Anders at Patchwerk Studios, Atlanta, Georgia
- Mixed by: Vincent Dilorenzo, Andre Harris and Vidal Davis at Studio 609, Philadelphia, Pennsylvania
- Assisted by: Mike Tsarsati

== Charts ==
=== Weekly charts ===
| Chart (2005) | Peak position |
|---|---|
| Australia (ARIA) | 7 |
| Australian Urban (ARIA) | 4 |
| Austria (Ö3 Austria Top 40) | 44 |
| Belgium (Ultratop 50 Flanders) | 38 |
| Belgium (Ultratip Bubbling Under Wallonia) | 3 |
| Canada CHR/Pop Top 30 (Radio & Records) | 4 |
| Europe (European Hot 100 Singles) | 12 |
| Finland (Suomen virallinen lista) | 17 |
| France (SNEP) | 48 |
| Germany (GfK) | 7 |
| Ireland (IRMA) | 7 |
| Italy (FIMI) | 46 |
| Netherlands (Single Top 100) | 44 |
| New Zealand (Recorded Music NZ) | 5 |
| Scotland Singles (Official Charts) | 9 |
| Switzerland (Schweizer Hitparade) | 11 |
| UK Singles (Official Charts) | 4 |
| UK Hip Hop/R&B (Official Charts) | 1 |
| US Billboard Hot 100 | 2 |
| US Dance Airplay (Billboard) | 20 |
| US Hot R&B/Hip-Hop Songs (Billboard) | 2 |
| US Pop Airplay (Billboard) | 6 |
| US Rhythmic Airplay (Billboard) | 1 |

=== Year-end charts ===
| Chart (2005) | Position |
|---|---|
| Australia (ARIA) | 61 |
| Germany (Media Control GfK) | 96 |
| New Zealand (RIANZ) | 43 |
| UK Singles (OCC) | 100 |
| UK Urban (Music Week) | 23 |
| US Billboard Hot 100 | 21 |
| US Hot R&B/Hip-Hop Songs (Billboard) | 16 |
| US Mainstream Top 40 (Billboard) | 35 |
| US Rhythmic Airplay (Billboard) | 8 |

== Certifications ==
| Region | Certification | Certified units/sales |
|---|---|---|
| Australia (ARIA) | Gold | 35,000^{^} |
| United Kingdom (BPI) | Silver | 200,000^{‡} |
| New Zealand (RMNZ) | Platinum | 30,000^{‡} |
| United States (RIAA) | 2× Platinum | 2,000,000^{‡} |
^{^} Shipments figures based on certification alone.^{‡} Sales+streaming figures based on certification alone.

== Release history ==
| Region | Date | Format(s) | Label(s) | Ref. |
|---|---|---|---|---|
| United States | March 1, 2005 | Rhythmic contemporary radio | LaFace; Sho'nuff | |
| United States | May 10, 2005 | Contemporary hit radio | LaFace; Sho'nuff | |
| Germany | July 4, 2005 | CD | LaFace; Sho'nuff | |
| Australia | July 18, 2005 | CD | LaFace; Sho'nuff | |
| United Kingdom | August 1, 2005 | CD | LaFace; Sho'nuff | |
