= 1, 2 Step =

2004 single by Ciara

Single by Ciara featuring Missy Elliott

from the album Goodies
- B-side: "Goodies" (Bimbo Jones full vocal)
- Released: November 1, 2004
- Studio: Doppler (Atlanta); Hit Factory Criteria (Miami)
- Genre: Electro
- Length: 3:22
- Label: LaFace; Sho'nuff
- Songwriters: Ciara Harris; Melissa Elliott; Phalon Alexander
- Producer: Jazze Pha

Ciara singles chronology
"Goodies" (2004)	"1, 2 Step" (2004)	"Oh" (2005)

Missy Elliott singles chronology
"Turn da Lights Off" (2004)	"1, 2 Step" (2004)	"Where Could He Be?" (2005)

Music video
- "1, 2 Step" on YouTube

"1, 2 Step" is a song by American singer Ciara featuring American rapper Missy Elliott. Written alongside producer Jazze Pha, it was released on November 1, 2004, as the second single of Ciara's debut studio album, Goodies (2004). It peaked within the top 10 of the charts in several countries worldwide, including Germany, New Zealand and the United Kingdom. In the United States, the song peaked at number two on the Billboard Hot 100 and stayed there for seven weeks. The song is heavily inspired by 1980s electro music production. Throughout the song, Ciara gives a description of how the song's beat feels as she exhorts party-goers to dance to the music. "1, 2 Step" was ranked 59th on Billboard's Top 100 Songs of the 2000s.

== Background and composition ==
"1, 2 Step" is one of four songs Ciara and Jazze Pha originally recorded at Doppler Studios in Atlanta two years before the release of Goodies. It is explained that Ciara was inspired by Roscoe Blunt, leading to the creation of this song. "The two connected so well, that half of the album was made within eight days or so." Pha asked Missy Elliott to appear on the track and she accepted. Elliott recorded her rap verse at the Hit Factory Criteria in Miami. She did not meet Ciara until the song's music video was filmed.

"1, 2 Step" is an electro song, created on one of Jazze Pha's five Akai MPC3000s. Pha used laser pulses from E-mu Proteus in the 2000s that were used for old school hip hop songs and b-boy break dance tracks. "1, 2 Step" is inspired by Afrika Bambaataa's "Planet Rock". Jazze Pha thought about how he could create a more melodic version and "shared some interesting ideas on what kind of music he would like to produce with her. Let's put it this way, it would be epic." "1, 2 Step" references her past song "Goodies" and "We Will Rock You" by Queen. Missy Elliott's verse was inspired by Teena Marie's song "Square Biz".

== Critical reception ==
"1, 2 Step" received favorable reviews from music critics. Contact Music gave the song three out of five stars and called it "arse shaking floor filling R&B" and a "wicked melodic souful twist." Jason Birchmeier of AllMusic was published that the track is "good, if not great." Gerardo E. wrote it is "a feel good track," something that is not overproduced but works its magic." Kate Watkins of The Situation called it "a funky song in the style we have come to expect from Missy." Fazed stated that the song is about "joys of dancing around with family." Slant thought that "1, 2 Step" was a "fun dance track."

"1, 2 Step" was nominated for the 2006 Grammy Award for "Best Rap/Sung Collaboration," but lost to "Numb/Encore" by Jay-Z and Linkin Park. The song also received a nomination at the Soul Train Lady of Soul Music Awards for "Best Dance Cut." The song was nominated for "Viewer's Choice" at the 2005 BET Awards, but lost to Omarion's "O." The song won the award "Best Performed Songs in the ASCAP Repertory for the 2005 Survey Year," which included the title track from the album as well as third single, "Oh." The song won the award for "Choice Music R&B/Hip Hop Track" at the 2005 Teen Choice Awards and "Best Collaboration" and "Viewer's Choice" at the BET Awards in 2005.

== Chart performance ==
"1, 2 Step" debuted at number 74 on the US Billboard Hot 100. on October 30, 2004. On the January 8, 2005, issue of Billboard, the song climbed to number two on the chart and stayed there for seven weeks, becoming Ciara's second top-10 single. "1, 2 Step" reached number one on the Hot Dance Airplay and Top 40 Mainstream charts. It also peaked within the top five on the Hot R&B/Hip-Hop Songs and Rhythmic Airplay charts and within the top 30 on the Hot Dance Club Play chart. "1, 2 Step" was ranked at number five for the year on the Billboard Year-End Hot 100 singles of 2005 and was certified seven-times platinum by the Recording Industry Association of America (RIAA) for sales of over seven million digital copies in the United States.

Internationally, "1, 2 Step" was successful, reaching the top 10 in several countries. In the United Kingdom and Ireland, "1, 2 Step" entered and peaked at number three on both the UK and Irish Singles Charts. In Ireland, the single stayed at three for three weeks. The song reached number two in Australia for one week and in New Zealand for two weeks. It was a top-30 hit in Belgium (Flanders and Wallonia), France, the Netherlands, and Sweden.

== Music video ==
The music video for "1, 2 Step" was directed by Benny Boom. It takes place in an Atlanta dance studio and on the streets. R&B boy band, B5, makes a short appearance in the video, along with Lloyd and Lil Scrappy. Ciara can be seen teaching others the song's title "one, two step" dance, which is similar to the traditional grapevine.

=== Synopsis ===
The video begins with Ciara putting her Goodies CD in a radio, setting it to the "1, 2 Step" track, and pressing the play button. As the song begins, you see Jazze Pha reciting the introduction, featuring Elliott, and then finally Ciara herself. We see Ciara and her dancers, dancing in the Atlanta dance studio, and certain shots of her teaching her female friend the "1, 2 Step". We then see a clip of Ciara meeting up with B5 and performing the "1, 2 Step". Later, Ciara is seen dancing alone on the streets. While dancing at the studio, she looks behind her, and sees Elliott in the mirror, says she is just looking things. Then Elliott begins to rap her verse and they continue dancing with each other in front of the mirror, until the songs ends. During this time, we also see shots of Ciara teaching a group of young girls the dance and also, she meets a boy who is standing in front of his house and kind of gives him a flirtatious look. We also see four skaters, three male, and one female skater, skating in the streets and a last shot of Ciara and her dancers.

== Track listings ==
US 12-inch single

A1. "1, 2 Step" (main) – 3:22
A2. "1, 2 Step" (instrumental) – 3:22
B1. "1, 2 Step" (main) – 3:22
B2. "1, 2 Step" (acappella) – 3:14

UK CD1

1. "1, 2 Step" (album version) – 3:22
2. "1, 2 Step" (instrumental) – 3:22

UK CD2

1. "1, 2 Step" (album version) – 3:22
2. "1, 2 Step" (Delinquent "Growing Pains" remix) – 4:55
3. "1, 2 Step" (Phatbelly club remix) – 3:30
4. "1, 2 Step" (Eazy remix) – 5:16
5. "1, 2 Step" (video)

UK 12-inch single

A1. "1, 2 Step" (album version) – 3:22
A2. "1, 2 Step" (Phatbelly club remix) – 3:30
B1. "1, 2 Step" (Delinquent "Growing Pains" remix) – 4:55
B2. "1, 2 Step" (Eazy remix) – 5:16

European CD single

1. "1, 2 Step" (album version) – 3:22
2. "1, 2 Step" (Johnny Budz Mixshow edit) – 4:40

Australian CD single

1. "1, 2 Step" (album version) – 3:22
2. "1, 2 Step" (Johnny Budz Mixshow edit) – 4:40
3. "1, 2 Step" (Ford's E-Hop club mix) – 5:28
4. "Goodies" (Bimbo Jones full vocal) – 7:18

== Credits and personnel ==
Credits are taken from the UK CD1 liner notes.

Studios

- Recorded at Doppler Studios (Atlanta, Georgia) and Hit Factory Criteria (Miami)
- Mixed at Patchwerk Studios (Atlanta, Georgia)

Personnel

- Ciara – writing (as Ciara Harris), vocals
- Jazze Pha – writing (as Phalon Alexander), production
- Missy Elliott – writing, featured vocals
- Pierre Medore – vocal production
- Sam Thomas – recording
- Carlos Bedoya – recording
- Leslie Brathwaite – mixing
- Kori Anders – mixing assistant

== Charts ==
=== Weekly charts ===
Chart (2004–2005)	Peak position
Australia (ARIA)	2
Australian Urban (ARIA)	1
Austria (Ö3 Austria Top 40)	42
Belgium (Ultratop 50 Flanders)	14
Belgium (Ultratop 50 Wallonia)	15
Canada CHR/Pop Top 30 (Radio & Records)	1
Croatia (HRT)	7
Czech Republic (IFPI)	35
Europe (European Hot 100 Singles)	3
Finland (Suomen virallinen lista)	10
France (SNEP)	31
Germany (GfK)	7
Hungary (Rádiós Top 40)	30
Ireland (IRMA)	3
Italy (FIMI)	12
Netherlands (Dutch Top 40)	18
Netherlands (Single Top 100)	12
New Zealand (Recorded Music NZ)	2
Scottish Singles Sales (Official Charts)	4
Sweden (Sverigetopplistan)	23
Switzerland (Schweizer Hitparade)	5
UK Singles (Official Charts)	3
UK Hip Hop/R&B	1
US Billboard Hot 100	2
US Dance Club Songs (Billboard)	29
US Dance Airplay (Billboard)	1
US Hot R&B/Hip-Hop Songs (Billboard)	4
US Pop Airplay (Billboard)	1
US Rhythmic Airplay (Billboard)	2

Chart (2015)	Peak position
US R&B/Hip-Hop Digital Songs (Billboard)	37

=== Year-end charts ===
Chart (2004)	Position
US Rhythmic Top 40 (Billboard)	88

Chart (2005)	Position
Australia (ARIA)	13
Australian Urban (ARIA)	9
Belgium (Ultratop 50 Flanders)	73
Belgium (Ultratop 50 Wallonia)	88
Brazil (Crowley)	100
Europe (European Hot 100 Singles)	62
Germany (Media Control GfK)	64
New Zealand (RIANZ)	17
Romania (Romanian Top 100)	8
Switzerland (Schweizer Hitparade)	39
UK Singles (OCC)	44
UK Urban (Music Week)	3
US Billboard Hot 100	5
US Hot Dance Airplay (Billboard)	5
US Hot R&B/Hip-Hop Songs (Billboard)	15
US Mainstream Top 40 (Billboard)	4
US Rhythmic Top 40 (Billboard)	7

=== Decade-end charts ===
Chart (2000–2009)	Position
US Billboard Hot 100	59

== Certifications ==
Region	Certification	Certified units/sales
Australia (ARIA)	Platinum	70,000^{^}
Canada (Music Canada)	Gold	10,000^{*}
Germany (BVMI)	Gold	150,000^{‡}
New Zealand (RMNZ)	4× Platinum	120,000^{‡}
United Kingdom (BPI)	Platinum	600,000^{‡}
United States (RIAA)	7× Platinum	7,000,000^{‡}
^{*} Sales figures based on certification alone.^{^} Shipments figures based on certification alone.^{‡} Sales+streaming figures based on certification alone.

== Release history ==
Region	Date	Format(s)	Label(s)	Ref.
United States	November 1, 2004	Rhythmic contemporary; urban radio	LaFace; Sho'nuff	
United States	December 6, 2004	Contemporary hit radio	LaFace; Sho'nuff	
Australia	February 28, 2005	CD	LaFace; Sho'nuff; Sony BMG	
Germany	March 14, 2005	CD	LaFace; Sho'nuff; Sony BMG	
United Kingdom	April 11, 2005	12-inch vinyl; CD	LaFace; Sho'nuff; Sony BMG	

== See also ==
- List of number-one dance airplay hits of 2005 (U.S.)
