= Goodies (song) =

2004 single by Ciara

Single by Ciara featuring Petey Pablo

from the album Goodies
- Released: June 8, 2004
- Genre: Crunk&B
- Length: 3:43
- Label: LaFace; Sho'nuff
- Songwriters: Ciara Harris; Jonathan Smith; LaMarquis Jefferson; Craig Love; Garrett Hamler
- Producer: Lil Jon

Ciara singles chronology
"Goodies" (2004)	"1, 2 Step" (2004)

Petey Pablo singles chronology
"Freek-a-Leek" (2004)	"Goodies" (2004)	"Vibrate" (2004)

Music videos
- "Goodies" on YouTube

"Goodies" is a song by American singer Ciara featuring American rapper Petey Pablo. It was released as Ciara's debut single and as the lead single from her first studio album, Goodies, in June 2004. "Goodies" was written by Ciara, Sean Garrett, LaMarquis Jefferson, Craig Love, and Lil Jon, who also produced the song. It was recorded as an answer song to Pablo's hit single, "Freek-a-Leek". The song's lead woman refuses men's sexual advances, proclaiming that they will not get her "goodies" because "they stay in the jar."

The single was well-received by critics, who acclaimed its whistling crunk beat and Ciara's breathy vocals. "Goodies" was a commercial success, peaking at number one on the US Billboard Hot 100 for seven weeks, becoming the longest-running number-one debut single by a female artist on the chart since Debby Boone's "You Light Up My Life" in 1977. Internationally, "Goodies" topped the charts in the United Kingdom and peaked within the top 10 of the charts in Germany, New Zealand, and Switzerland. The song gave Ciara the title as the "First Lady or Princess of Crunk&B."

The song's accompanying music video, directed by Benny Boom, featured guest appearances from Bone Crusher, Monica, Rasheeda, Jazze Pha, Young Jeezy, and Lil Jon. The video depicts Ciara dancing in front of a blue and white background with her backup dancers. This scene is where Ciara first does the "Matrix," which later became her signature move. The song was performed on BET's 106 & Park and at the 2005 Billboard Music Awards along with "1, 2 Step" and "Oh".

== Background ==
After leaving the group Hearsay at the age of 15, Atlanta native Ciara earned a writing job via her manager, for Atlanta's Tricky Stewart and The-Dream's RedZone Entertainment, penning songs for Mýa and Fantasia among others. According to Ciara, no one believed in her dreams of hearing her own music on the radio until she met producer Jazze Pha in 2002. Within five months of meeting her, Pha signed her to his Sho'nuff label and they had already recorded five tracks. About Ciara, Jazze Pha said, "What was really lacking is the Janet Jackson, high-energy dance [music]. Ciara fills that void. She's pretty, she can dance, she can write music, and kids love her. Everyone loves her."

== Writing ==
Ciara wrote the song in response to Usher's "Yeah!".

In 2003, Ciara was signed by LaFace Records executive, L.A. Reid, whom she was introduced to by Jazze Pha. She began production on her debut album later that year. In early 2004, Ciara wrote a demo with Sean Garrett, co-writer of Usher, Lil Jon and Ludacris' crunk hit "Yeah!". After hearing a demo, Lil Jon, who also produced and was featured on "Yeah!", began to work on the full record, to have it released on LaFace, which was also Usher's label.

However, she decided to use the song to go against the spot and deliver lyrics in contrast of female promiscuity lines delivered by fellow female artists. To give her a title to stand out, Lil Jon called Ciara as the "Princess of Crunk&B." Called the female counterpart to "Yeah!" and fellow crunk hit "Freek-a-Leek" by Petey Pablo, Laface looked to capitalize on the success of the previous songs.

The song was originally titled "Cookies"; however Lil Jon encouraged Ciara and Sean Garrett to revise the song, with the final version being "Goodies". In August 2020, Ciara revealed that her label almost shopped the song to Britney Spears.

== Composition ==
"Goodies"
"Goodies," the crunk counterpart to "Yeah!," lyrically speaks of female empowerment and abstinence-promoting lyrics.

"Goodies" drew comparisons to the Usher song "Yeah!" and Kelis's "Milkshake." The song makes use of a repeated whistle, "faux operatic vocals" in parts, and a western guitar riff near the end. "Goodies" is a midtempo crunk&B song. The song features a whistling beat, with several crunk-pop synths throughout its course, and a guitar rhythm as it opens into its third verse and in its outro. Petey Pablo raps the first part of the first and third verses, while Ciara sings the rest of the song.

== Critical reception ==
The song received positive reviews from music critics. Fazed.com called the song "both clever and ironic considering how sexy her image is" and that it has a "singularly disarming combination of an empowering message backed by an intoxicatingly sexy beat." The Situation declared the track as "a great dance tune with a solid beat." Also, it noted Ciara shows "a lot of attitude, with girl empowering lyrics." Slant published, "it's not the chorus that gets stuck in your head... but the incessant oscillating whistle (I swear you can hear dogs barking halfway through the song)." MusicOMH reviewed, "Goodies" as "an instantly recognisable tune" and called it a "typically upbeat benefiting from Lil' Jon." Rolling Stone listed it as the 68th best R&B song of the 21st century.

Hiphopgalaxy.com called the track an "ultimate party anthem of the summer, but it's one of the best singles of the year." The song has "an infectious chorus" and "a crunked up groove." Blender published that Ciara "sounds like she's rapping right back at him, delivering her lines in a measured, sultry cadence with hardly any variation in tone or pitch." In 2005, "Goodies" was nominated for Best R&B/Soul or Rap Song of the Year at the Soul Train Lady of Soul Awards and in 2006, it won the Best Performed Songs in the ASCAP Repertory for the 2005 Survey Year at the ASCAP Pop Music Awards, including "1, 2 Step" featuring Missy Elliott and "Oh" featuring Ludacris.

== Chart performance ==
In the issue dated June 19, 2004, "Goodies" debuted at number 85 on the US Hot R&B/Hip-Hop Singles & Tracks—now known as the Hot R&B/Hip-Hop Songs chart. It went on to peak at number one on the chart for six consecutive weeks. The song debuted at number 94 on the US Billboard Hot 100 on June 26, 2004. The song quickly became a commercial success as it reached the summit of the chart after only twelve weeks. It spent seven weeks at number one, becoming the longest-running number-one debut single by a female artist since Debby Boone's "You Light Up My Life" in 1977. It reached three on the Mainstream Top 40 chart. It ranked number nine on the 2004 U.S. Billboard year-end chart. According to the Billboard Hot 100 decade-end chart, it is the 31st most successful song of the 2000s. The single was certified platinum by the Recording Industry Association of America (RIAA) for sales of over a million digital copies in the United States.

In the United Kingdom, "Goodies" debuted at number 68 on the UK Singles Chart on January 9, 2005—for the week ending January 15, 2005. Two weeks later on the week ending January 29, 2005, it went at the top of the charts summit which interrupted Elvis Presley's three week chart reign with various rereleased singles. It topped the chart for one week. "Goodies" became the second ever crunk song to top the UK Singles Chart, after "Yeah!" by Usher featuring Lil Jon and Ludacris achieved the feat 10 months previously. In the Republic of Ireland, the song debuted and peaked at number four on the Irish Singles Chart.

In Switzerland, the song debuted at number 38 on the Swiss Singles Chart, before peaking at number 10 five weeks later. In Australia, "Goodies" debuted at number 22 on the ARIA Singles Chart, before falling to 23 in its second week. The song recovered in its third week to reach a new peak at number 19. In New Zealand, the single debuted at number 12 on the RIANZ Singles chart, and peaked at 10 in the next week. In Germany, the song debuted at number 16 on the German Singles Chart, before peaking at 10 two weeks later. In France, the song debuted at number 29 on the French Singles Chart, before peaking at 27 in its second week.

== Music video ==
The music video for "Goodies" was directed by Benny Boom. It shows Ciara and her friends driving in an Oldsmobile 442 convertible along the Atlanta streets to the local car wash. It features cameo appearances by Bone Crusher, Monica, Rasheeda, Jazze Pha, Jeezy, Lil Jon and among others. Ciara filmed the video for 27 straight hours with director Benny Boom. It begins with Ciara coming out her house. Her friend screams out, "What up dawg?!" and Ciara replies the same way. Ciara's sister then runs outside saying that Jazze Pha is on the phone. Jazze tells Ciara that they are going to the carwash to hang out and Ciara says she will also be coming along. She then gives the phone back to her sister and tells her to stay out of her room. The song then begins and Ciara starts singing her intro once Petey Pablo raps his verse. During this intro, we see Ciara going along with her friends driving to the carwash. On her way there she meets a few young men and invites them to the carwash. She then arrives to the carwash and meets up with different people, including Monica. During the song, Ciara dances in front of a blue and white background with her backup dancers. This scene is where Ciara first does the "Matrix," her signature move. The extended version of the video includes Ciara full-length dance with the backup dancers, and also features more of her and Monica duo shot.

== Live performances ==
Ciara performed "Goodies" several times. Her first-ever performance of "Goodies" was on BET's 106 & Park. In 2005, Ciara performed the song, along with "1, 2 Step" and "Oh," at the 2005 Billboard Music Awards. She also performed the song at various summer festivals around the United States.

== Formats and track listings ==
- US digital download
1. "Goodies" featuring Petey Pablo
- UK CD single number one
1. "Goodies" featuring Petey Pablo
2. "Goodies"
- UK CD single number two
1. "Goodies" featuring Petey Pablo
2. "Goodies" featuring T.I. and Jazze Pha
3. "Goodies (Richard X Remix)" featuring M.I.A. (UK exclusive)
4. "Goodies (Bimbo Jones Remix)" (UK exclusive)
5. "Goodies" (video)
6. "Goodies" (ringtone)
- German and French maxi single
1. "Goodies" featuring Petey Pablo
2. "Goodies"
3. "Goodies" featuring T.I. and Jazze Pha
- French CD single
1. "Goodies" featuring Petey Pablo
2. "Goodies" featuring T.I. and Jazze Pha

== Personnel ==
Recording

- Hitco, Atlanta, Georgia and Circle House Studios, Miami, FL and Sony Music Studios, NYC

Credits

- Ciara – vocals
- Sean Garrett – vocal production
- Petey Pablo – vocals
- Lamarquis Jefferson – bass guitar
- Lil Jon – additional vocals, production, mixing, drum programming, sound design
- Craig Love – guitar
- Steve Nowacynski – engineer
- Charles Sanders – engineer
- Ray Seay – mixing
- Brian Stanley – engineer, mixing

== Charts ==
=== Weekly charts ===
Weekly chart performance for "Goodies"
Chart (2004–2005)	Peak position
Australia (ARIA)	19
Australian Urban (ARIA)	5
Austria (Ö3 Austria Top 40)	35
Belgium (Ultratop 50 Flanders)	24
Belgium (Ultratop 50 Wallonia)	40
Canada CHR/Pop Top 30 (Radio & Records)	7
Europe (European Hot 100 Singles)	3
France (SNEP)	27
Germany (GfK)	10
Greece (IFPI)	24
Ireland (IRMA)	4
Netherlands (Dutch Top 40)	28
Netherlands (Single Top 100)	24
New Zealand (Recorded Music NZ)	10
Norway (VG-lista)	15
Scotland Singles (Official Charts)	4
Sweden (Sverigetopplistan)	39
Switzerland (Schweizer Hitparade)	10
UK Singles (Official Charts)	1
UK Hip Hop/R&B (Official Charts)	1
US Billboard Hot 100	1
US Hot R&B/Hip-Hop Songs (Billboard)	1
US Pop Airplay (Billboard)	3
US Rhythmic Airplay (Billboard)	1

=== Year-end charts ===
2004 year-end chart performance for "Goodies"
Chart (2004)	Position
Germany (Media Control GfK)	84
UK Urban (Music Week)	25
US Billboard Hot 100	9
US Hot R&B/Hip-Hop Singles & Tracks (Billboard)	12
US Mainstream Top 40 (Billboard)	35
US Rhythmic Top 40 (Billboard)	2

2005 year-end chart performance for "Goodies"
Chart (2005)	Position
Europe (Eurochart Hot 100)	76
Switzerland (Schweizer Hitparade)	94
UK Singles (OCC)	59
US Rhythmic Top 40 (Billboard)	87

=== Decade-end charts ===
Decade-end chart performance for "Goodies"
Chart (2000–2009)	Position
US Billboard Hot 100	31

== Certifications and sales ==
Certifications and sales for "Goodies"
Region	Certification	Certified units/sales
France	—	33,211
New Zealand (RMNZ)	Platinum	30,000^{‡}
United Kingdom (BPI)	Gold	400,000^{‡}
United States (RIAA)	4× Platinum	4,000,000^{‡}
^{‡} Sales+streaming figures based on certification alone.

== Release history ==
Release dates and formats for "Goodies"
Region	Release date	Format	Label	Ref.
United States	June 8, 2004	Digital download	LaFace	
United States	August 24, 2004	Mainstream radio	LaFace	
Germany	October 18, 2004	Maxi single	LaFace	
France	October 19, 2004	Maxi single	LaFace	
United Kingdom	January 17, 2005	CD single	LaFace	
France	February 1, 2005	CD single	LaFace	

== See also ==
- List of Hot 100 number-one singles of 2004 (U.S.)
- List of number-one R&B singles of 2004 (U.S.)
- List of number-one singles from the 2000s (UK)

== Bibliography ==
- Ciara (2006). BET Official presents Ciara: The Evolution (BET Exclusive DVD) New York: LaFace Records and Zomba Label Group – Ciara explains the writing process of "Goodies" and filming the music video.
