= List of awards and nominations received by Ludacris =

Ludacris awards and nominations
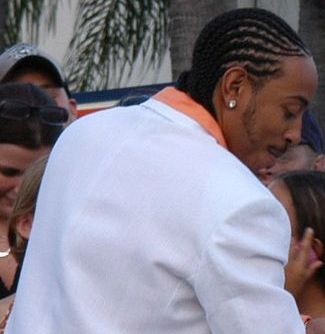
- Ludacris signs autographs at the MTV Music Video Awards in 2004
Awards and nominations
Award	Wins	Nominations
American Music Awards	0	2
BET	9	12
Grammy	3	17
MTV VMA	1	6
MTV Movie Awards	0	1
Screen Actors Guild Awards	1	2
CMT Music Awards	1	2

Totals (Note: Certain award groups do not simply award one winner. They acknowledge several different recipients, have runners-up, and have third place. Since this is a specific recognition and is different from losing an award, runner-up mentions are considered wins in this award tally. For simplification and to avoid errors, each award in this list has been presumed to have had a prior nomination.)
- Wins: 17
- Nominations: 43

Ludacris is a three-time Grammy Award-winning American rapper and actor from Atlanta, Georgia. He has released eight studio albums, all which have been released on the Def Jam Recordings record label: Back for the First Time (2000), Word of Mouf (2001), Chicken-n-Beer (2003), The Red Light District (2004), Release Therapy (2006), Theater of the Mind (2008), Battle of the Sexes (2010) and Ludaversal (2015). His first five albums have all achieved multi-platinum status, and his next 2 albums achieved gold status. In addition, he has 4 albums that peaked at number one on the Billboard 200 charts.

Ludacris has received twenty Grammy Award nominations, and has won three: "Best Rap/Sung Collaboration" for the song "Yeah!" in 2005, and both "Best Rap Song" for "Money Maker" and "Best Rap Album" for the album Release Therapy in 2007. He has also received twelve nominations from the BET Awards, winning two: "Viewer's Choice" for "Yeah!" in 2004 and "Best Collaboration" for "Runaway Love" in 2007. Ludacris has also acted in several films; the Screen Actors Guild presented him the award for "Outstanding Cast in a Motion Picture" for his performance in the film Crash. Overall, Ludacris has received 12 awards from 41 nominations.

== American Music Awards ==
The American Music Awards is an annual awards ceremony created by Dick Clark in 1973. Ludacris has received two nominations.

Year	Nominee / work	Award	Result
2002	Word of Mouf	Favorite Album – R&B/Hip-Hop	Nominated
2005	Ludacris	Favorite Male Hip-Hop Artist	Nominated

== BET Awards ==
=== BET Awards ===
The BET Awards were established in 2001 by the Black Entertainment Television network. Ludacris has received nine awards from twelve nominations.

Year	Nominee / work	Award	Result
2002	"One Minute Man"	Video of the Year	Won
2002	Ludacris	Best Male Hip-Hop Artist	Won
2003	"Gossip Folks"	Best Collaboration	Nominated
2004	"Yeah!"	Viewer's Choice	Won
2004	"Yeah!"	Best Collaboration	Won
2004	"Yeah!"	Video of the Year	Won
2004	Ludacris	Best Male Hip-Hop Artist	Nominated
2005	Ludacris	Best Male Hip-Hop Artist	Won
2006	"Unpredictable"	Best Collaboration	Nominated
2006	Ludacris	Best Actor	Won
2007	Ludacris	Best Male Hip-Hop Artist	Nominated
2007	"Runaway Love"	Best Collaboration	Won
2008	"I'm So Hood"	Best Collaboration	Won

=== BET Hip Hop Awards ===
Year	Nominee / work	Award	Result
2008	"I'm So Hood (Remix)" (with DJ Khaled, Young Jeezy, Busta Rhymes, Big Boi, Lil Wayne, Fat Joe, Birdman & Rick Ross)	Best Hip Hop Video	Nominated
2008	"I'm So Hood (Remix)" (with DJ Khaled, Young Jeezy, Busta Rhymes, Big Boi, Lil Wayne, Fat Joe, Birdman & Rick Ross)	Best Hip Hop Collaboration	Won
2010	"All I Do Is Win" (with DJ Khaled, T-Pain, Ludacris, Rick Ross & Snoop Dogg)	Best Club Banger	Nominated
2011	"Country Sh*t (Remix)" (with Big K.R.I.T. & Bun B)	Reese's Perfect Combo Award	Nominated
2012	"Same Damn Time (Remix)"	Sweet 16: Best Featured Verse	Nominated

== CMT Music Awards ==
The CMT Music Awards is an annual ceremony held in Nashville, Tennessee, dedicated exclusively to honor country music videos. It was established in 1967, and had several names throughout the years. In 2002, it was moved to Country Music Television and, in 2005, was renamed CMT Music Awards. Ludacris has received three nominations and one win.

Year	Award	Nominated work / Recipient	Result	Ref.
2018	"The Champion" (with Carrie Underwood)	Video of the Year	Nominated	
2018	"The Champion" (with Carrie Underwood)	Female Video of the Year	Won	
2018	"The Champion" (with Carrie Underwood)	Collaborative Video of the Year	Nominated	

== ECHO Awards ==
Year	Nominee / work	Award	Result	Ref.
2005	"Yeah!" (with Usher & Lil Jon)	Hit of the Year	Nominated	

== Golden Raspberry Awards ==
The Golden Raspberry Awards (also known in short terms as Razzies and Razzie Awards) is a mock booby prize award in recognition of the worst in film. Thus far, Ludacris has received one nomination (result pending).

Year	Nominee / work	Award	Result
2019	Show Dogs (voice only)	Worst Supporting Actor	Nominated

== Grammy Awards ==
The Grammy Awards are awarded annually by the National Academy of Recording Arts and Sciences of the United States. Ludacris has received three awards from seventeen nominations.

Year	Nominee / work	Award	Result
2002	"One Minute Man" (with Missy Elliott & Trina)	Best Short-Form Music Video	Nominated
2002	"Area Codes" (featuring Nate Dogg)	Best Rap/Sung Collaboration	Nominated
2002	Back for the First Time	Best Rap Album	Nominated
2003	Word of Mouf	Best Rap Album	Nominated
2003	"Rollout (My Business)"	Best Male Rap Solo Performance	Nominated
2004	"Stand Up"	Best Male Rap Solo Performance	Nominated
2004	"Act a Fool"	Best Song Written for a Motion Picture, Television or Other Visual Media	Nominated
2004	"Gossip Folks" (with Missy Elliott)	Best Rap Performance by a Duo or Group	Nominated
2005	"Yeah!" (with Usher & Lil Jon)	Best Rap/Sung Collaboration	Won
2005	"Yeah!" (with Usher & Lil Jon)	Best R&B Song	Nominated
2005	"Yeah!" (with Usher & Lil Jon)	Record of the Year	Nominated
2006	"Number One Spot"	Best Rap Solo Performance	Nominated
2007	"Money Maker" (featuring Pharrell)	Best Rap Song	Won
2007	Release Therapy	Best Rap Album	Won
2007	"Unpredictable" (with Jamie Foxx)	Best Rap/Sung Collaboration	Nominated
2007	"Georgia" (with Field Mob featuring Jamie Foxx)	Best Rap Performance by a Duo or Group	Nominated
2009	"Wish You Would" (featuring T.I.)	Best Rap Performance by a Duo or Group	Nominated
2011	"My Chick Bad" (featuring Nicki Minaj)	Best Rap Performance by a Duo or Group	Nominated
2011	"How Low"	Best Rap Solo Performance	Nominated
2013	"Tonight (Best You Ever Had)" (with John Legend)	Best Rap/Sung Collaboration	Nominated

== International Dance Music Awards ==
Year	Nominee / work	Award	Result	Ref.
2005	"Yeah!" (with Usher and Lil Jon)	Best R&B/Urban Dance Track	Won	
2005	"Get Back"	Best Rap/Hip-Hop Dance Track	Nominated	

== iHeartRadio Music Awards ==
Year	Nominee / work	Award	Result	Ref.
2026	Himself	iHeartRadio Landmark Award	Won	

== MTV Europe Music Awards ==
Year	Nominee / work	Award	Result	Ref.
2004	"Yeah!"	Best Song	Nominated	

== MTV Movie Awards ==
The MTV Movie Awards is an annual awards ceremony established in 1992 by the MTV television network. Ludacris has received one nomination.

Year	Nominee / work	Award	Result
2004	2 Fast 2 Furious	Best Male Breakthrough Performance	Nominated

== MTV Video Music Awards ==
The MTV Video Music Awards is an annual awards ceremony established in 1984 by MTV. Ludacris has received one awards from six nominations.

Year	Nominee / work	Award	Result	Ref.
2002	"One Minute Man (Remix)" (with Missy Elliott and Trina)	Best Hip-Hop Video	Nominated	
2002	"One Minute Man (Remix)" (with Missy Elliott and Trina)	Best Art Direction in a Video	Nominated	
2002	"One Minute Man (Remix)" (with Missy Elliott and Trina)	Best Cinematography in a Video	Nominated	
2002	"One Minute Man (Remix)" (with Missy Elliott and Trina)	Best Direction in a Video	Nominated	
2002	"One Minute Man (Remix)" (with Missy Elliott and Trina)	Best Editing in a Video	Nominated	
2002	"One Minute Man (Remix)" (with Missy Elliott and Trina)	Best Special Effects in a Video	Nominated	
2002	"Area Codes" (with Nate Dogg)	Best Video from a Film	Nominated	
2002	"Saturday (Oooh! Ooooh!)" (with Sleepy Brown)	Best Rap Video	Nominated	
2003	"Move" (with Mystikal)	Best Rap Video	Nominated	
2004	"Stand Up" (with Shawnna)	Best Rap Video	Nominated	
2004	"Yeah!" (with Usher and Lil Jon)	Video of the Year	Nominated	
2004	"Yeah!" (with Usher and Lil Jon)	Best Male Video	Won	
2004	"Yeah!" (with Usher and Lil Jon)	Best Dance Video	Won	
2004	"Yeah!" (with Usher and Lil Jon)	Best Choreography in a Video	Nominated	
2004	"Holidae In" (with Chingy and Snoop Dogg)	Best Hip-Hop Video	Nominated	
2005	"Number One Spot"	Best Rap Video	Won	
2005	"Number One Spot"	Best Special Effects in a Video	Nominated	
2005	"Oh" (with Ciara)	Best R&B Video	Nominated	
2006	"Unpredictable" (with Jamie Foxx)	Best R&B Video	Nominated	
2010	"Baby" (with Justin Bieber)	Best New Artist	Won	
2011	"Tonight (I'm Lovin' You)" (with Enrique Iglesias and DJ Frank E)	Best Latino Artist	Nominated	

== mtvU Woodie Awards ==
Year	Nominee / work	Award	Result	Ref.
2006	Ludacris	Good Woodie	Nominated	
2008	Ludacris	Good Woodie	Nominated	

== Screen Actors Guild Awards ==
The Screen Actors Guild Awards is an annual awards ceremony established in 1995 by the Screen Actors Guild. Ludacris has received one award from two nominations.

Year	Nominee / work	Award	Result
2005	Crash	Outstanding Performance by a Cast in a Motion Picture	Won
2005	Hustle & Flow	Outstanding Performance by a Cast in a Motion Picture	Nominated

== Teen Choice Awards ==
Year	Nominee / work	Award	Result	Ref.
2002	Himself	Choice Male Artist	Nominated	
2002	Himself	Choice R&B/Hip-Hop/Rap Artist	Nominated	
2002	Word of Mouf	Choice Album	Nominated	
2004	Himself	Choice Male Artist	Nominated	
2004	Himself	Choice Rap Artist	Nominated	
2004	"Yeah!"	Choice Single	Nominated	
2004	"Yeah!"	Choice R&B Track	Won	
2004	"Yeah!"	Choice Music Hook Up	Won	
2004	"Stand Up"	Choice Hip-Hop/Rap Track	Nominated	
2005	Crash	Choice Movie: Rap Artist	Nominated	
2005	Himself	Choice Music: Rap Artist	Nominated	
2005	"Lovers and Friends"	Choice Music: Rap Track	Nominated	
2005	"Number One Spot	Choice Music: Rap Track	Nominated	
2005	"Oh"	Choice Music: Make-Out Song	Won	
2005	"Oh"	Choice Summer Song	Nominated	
2006	Crash & Hustle & Flow	Choice Movie Actor: Drama/Action Adventure	Nominated	
2007	Himself	Choice Rap Artist	Nominated	
2010	Himself	Choice Rap Artist	Nominated	
2010	Battle of the Sexes	Choice Music: Rap Album	Nominated	
2012	"All Around the World"	Choice Summer Song	Nominated	
2015	Furious 7	Choice Movie: Chemistry	Nominated	

== World Music Awards ==
Year	Nominee / work	Award	Result
2014	Ludacris	World's Best Male Artist	Nominated
2014	Ludacris	World's Best Live Act	Nominated
2014	Ludacris	World's Best Entertainer of the Year	Nominated
