= List of Billboard number-one R&B/hip-hop albums of 2004 =

This page lists the albums that reached number-one on the Top R&B/Hip-Hop Albums and Top Rap Albums charts in 2004, which had been recently created in 2004. The Rap Albums chart, first published by Billboard in November 2004, partially serves as a distillation of rap-specific titles from the overall R&B/Hip-Hop Albums chart.

== Chart history ==
Key
†	Indicates best-performing album of 2004

Issue date	R&B/Hip-Hop Albums	Artist(s)	Rap Albums	Artist(s)	Refs.
January 3	The Diary of Alicia Keys	Alicia Keys	Did not materialize until the week of June 26, 2004		
January 10	The Diary of Alicia Keys	Alicia Keys	Did not materialize until the week of June 26, 2004		
January 17	The Diary of Alicia Keys	Alicia Keys	Did not materialize until the week of June 26, 2004		
January 24	The Diary of Alicia Keys	Alicia Keys	Did not materialize until the week of June 26, 2004		
January 31	Soulful	Ruben Studdard	Did not materialize until the week of June 26, 2004		
February 7	Soulful	Ruben Studdard	Did not materialize until the week of June 26, 2004		
February 14	Kamikaze	Twista	Did not materialize until the week of June 26, 2004		
February 21	Kamikaze	Twista	Did not materialize until the week of June 26, 2004		
February 28	The College Dropout	Kanye West	Did not materialize until the week of June 26, 2004		
March 6	The College Dropout	Kanye West	Did not materialize until the week of June 26, 2004		
March 13	Tough Luv	Young Gunz	Did not materialize until the week of June 26, 2004		
March 20	The College Dropout	Kanye West	Did not materialize until the week of June 26, 2004		
March 27	Bad Boy's 10th Anniversary... The Hits	Bad Boy Records / Various Artists	Did not materialize until the week of June 26, 2004		
April 3	Split Personality	Cassidy	Did not materialize until the week of June 26, 2004		
April 10	Confessions †	Usher	Did not materialize until the week of June 26, 2004		
April 17	Confessions †	Usher	Did not materialize until the week of June 26, 2004		
April 24	Confessions †	Usher	Did not materialize until the week of June 26, 2004		
May 1	Confessions †	Usher	Did not materialize until the week of June 26, 2004		
May 8	Hurt No More	Mario Winans	Did not materialize until the week of June 26, 2004		
May 15	D12 World	D12	Did not materialize until the week of June 26, 2004		
May 22	Confessions †	Usher	Did not materialize until the week of June 26, 2004		
May 29	Living Legends	8Ball & MJG	Did not materialize until the week of June 26, 2004		
June 5	Tical 0: The Prequel	Method Man	Did not materialize until the week of June 26, 2004		
June 12	Confessions †	Usher	Did not materialize until the week of June 26, 2004		
June 19	Confessions †	Usher	Did not materialize until the week of June 26, 2004		
June 26	Confessions †	Usher	Living Legends	8Ball & MJG	
July 3	To the 5 Boroughs	Beastie Boys	To the 5 Boroughs	Beastie Boys	
July 10	Kiss of Death	Jadakiss	Kiss of Death	Jadakiss	
July 17	The Hunger for More	Lloyd Banks	The Hunger for More	Lloyd Banks	
July 24	The Hunger for More	Lloyd Banks	The Hunger for More	Lloyd Banks	
July 31	The Hunger for More	Lloyd Banks	The Hunger for More	Lloyd Banks	
August 7	The Hunger for More	Lloyd Banks	True Story	Terror Squad	
August 14	True Story	Terror Squad	True Story	Terror Squad	
August 21	The Hunger for More	Lloyd Banks	The Hunger for More	Lloyd Banks	
August 28	Godfather Buried Alive	Shyne	Godfather Buried Alive	Shyne	
September 4	The Hard Way	213	The Hard Way	213	
September 11	Happy People/U Saved Me	R. Kelly	Straight Outta Cashville	Young Buck	
September 18	Beautifully Human: Words and Sounds Vol. 2	Jill Scott	The DEFinition	LL Cool J	
September 25	My Everything	Anita Baker	Straight Outta Cashville	Young Buck	
October 2	Suit	Nelly	Suit	Nelly	
October 9	Suit	Nelly	Suit	Nelly	
October 16	Goodies	Ciara	Suit	Nelly	
October 23	Confessions †	Usher	Suit	Nelly	
October 30	Confessions †	Usher	The New Danger	Mos Def	
November 6	Confessions †	Usher	Suit	Nelly	
November 13	Unfinished Business	R. Kelly and Jay-Z	Unfinished Business	R. Kelly and Jay-Z	
November 20	Thug Matrimony: Married to the Streets	Trick Daddy	Thug Matrimony: Married to the Streets	Trick Daddy	
November 27	Encore	Eminem	Encore	Eminem	
December 4	Encore	Eminem	Encore	Eminem	
December 11	Destiny Fulfilled	Destiny's Child	Encore	Eminem	
December 18	Urban Legend	T.I.	Urban Legend	T.I.	
December 25	The Red Light District	Ludacris	The Red Light District	Ludacris	

== See also ==
- 2004 in music
- 2004 in hip hop music
- List of Hot R&B/Hip-Hop Singles & Tracks number ones of 2004
- List of Billboard 200 number-one albums of 2004
