= Pimpin' All Over the World =

2005 single by Ludacris

Single by Ludacris featuring Bobby Valentino

from the album The Red Light District
- B-side: "Spur of the Moment"
- Released: May 16, 2005
- Length: 5:29
- Label: DTP; Def Jam South
- Songwriters: Christopher Bridges; Jamal Jones; Darnley Scantlebury
- Producers: Polow da Don; Donnie Scantz

Ludacris singles chronology
"The Potion" (2005)	"Pimpin' All Over the World" (2005)	"Georgia" (2005)

Bobby Valentino singles chronology
"Tell Me" (2005)	"Pimpin' All Over the World" (2005)	"My Angel (Never Leave You)" (2005)

Music video
- "Pimpin' All Over the World" on YouTube

"Pimpin' All Over the World" is a song by American rapper Ludacris featuring singer Bobby Valentino. The song was released on May 16, 2005, as the fourth and final single from Ludacris's fourth studio album, The Red Light District (2004), and was produced by Polow da Don and Donnie Scantz. Compositionally, Ludacris performs three verses on the song, Valentino performs the hook with backing harmonies from then-unknown singer Keri Hilson, and comedian Katt Williams provides a spoken word act on the outro. "Pimpin' All Over the World" reached number nine on the US Billboard Hot 100, and number two on the Billboard Hot Rap Tracks chart.

== Music video ==
The video for "Pimpin' All Over the World", filmed in Durban, South Africa, features Ludacris and Bobby Valentino on tropical islands relaxing, drinking, and watching women with binoculars as they dance.

== Track listings ==
US 12-inch single

A1. "Pimpin' All Over the World" (clean) – 4:03
A2. "Pimpin' All Over the World" (main) – 4:03
A3. "Pimpin' All Over the World" (instrumental) – 4:03
B1. "Spur of the Moment" (clean) – 4:15
B2. "Spur of the Moment" (main) – 4:15
B3. "Spur of the Moment" (instrumental) – 4:18

Australian CD single

1. "Pimpin' All Over the World" (album version edited)
2. "Pimpin' All Over the World" (12-inch version)
3. "Pimpin' All Over the World" (instrumental)

== Charts ==
=== Weekly charts ===
Chart (2005)	Peak position
Australia (ARIA)	28
Australian Urban (ARIA)	11
Canada CHR/Pop Top 30 (Radio & Records)	25
Netherlands (Urban Top 100)	63
US Billboard Hot 100	9
US Hot R&B/Hip-Hop Songs (Billboard)	5
US Hot Rap Songs (Billboard)	2
US Pop Airplay (Billboard)	18
US Rhythmic Airplay (Billboard)	3

=== Year-end charts ===
Chart (2005)	Position
US Billboard Hot 100	53
US Hot R&B/Hip-Hop Songs (Billboard)	41
US Mainstream Top 40 (Billboard)	88
US Rhythmic Top 40 (Billboard)	33

== Release history ==
Region	Date	Format(s)	Label(s)	Ref.
United States	May 16, 2005	Rhythmic contemporary; urban radio	DTP; Def Jam South	
United States	July 18, 2005	Contemporary hit radio	DTP; Def Jam South	
Australia	October 24, 2005	CD	DTP; Def Jam South	
