= The Potion =

Single by Ludacris

from the album The Red Light District
- B-side: "Pass Out"
- Released: April 20, 2005
- Recorded: 2004
- Genre: Hip hop
- Length: 3:55
- Label: DTP, Def Jam
- Songwriter(s): Christopher Bridges, Tim Mosley
- Producer(s): Timbaland

Ludacris singles chronology
"Oh" (2005)	"The Potion" (2005)	"Pimpin' All Over the World" (2005)

"The Potion" is the third single from Ludacris' fourth studio album, The Red Light District. It peaked at number 65 on the Hot R&B/Hip-Hop Songs singles chart. The beat was originally offered to Jay-Z for The Black Album, but was rejected in favor of the beat that was used in "Dirt off Your Shoulder". This song was the conclusion to the music video of the preceding single "Number One Spot". The song was also featured in the final dance sequence of Step Up 2: The Streets.

== Track listing ==
1. "The Potion" (Clean version)
2. "The Potion" (Main version)
3. "The Potion" (Instrumental)
4. "Pass Out" (Clean version)
5. "Pass Out" (Main version)
6. "Pass Out" (Instrumental)

== Charts ==
Chart (2004/2005)	Peak Position
U.S. Billboard Hot R&B/Hip-Hop Songs	65
