= Slap (song) =

Single by Ludacris

from the album Release Therapy
- Released: August 28, 2007
- Recorded: 2006
- Genre: Hip-hop
- Label: DTP, Def Jam
- Songwriters: C Bridges, A Harr, J Jackson
- Producer: The Runners

Ludacris singles chronology
"Runaway Love" (2007)	"Slap" (2007)	"Get Buck in Here" (2007)

"Slap" is the fourth single from Ludacris' fifth album Release Therapy (2006).

== Song information ==
"Slap" is an account of poverty in GW Bush's America. Its narrator explains that he is feeling tired about working a lot and getting a low wage, and because of this, he has thoughts about beating (in the uncensored version, killing) his boss. His frustration is then explained to be bigger than that: his best friend was murdered just a day before. He also explains that he has thoughts about robbing a bank to have enough money to feed his newborn baby. Later, at the end of the song, his car is robbed and he expresses an ever-bigger disappointment at the government. According to Allmusic reviewer Marisa Brown, Ludacris' character in the song has these thoughts because he is suffering from depression.

== Music video ==
The music video was released early in 2007. It is based on Martin Scorsese's Taxi Driver, with Ludacris as Travis Bickle, with many references to the movie, including Ludacris kicking over his TV while watching President Bush and doing the iconic "You talkin' to me?" in an interlude. The video shows Ludacris as a taxi driver (wearing the same jacket as Robert De Niro) and the video ends with Ludacris storming a brothel and punching the bouncer and a prostitute's customer, in a similar fashion to Taxi Driver's ending, but without the use of guns. It is dedicated to Ludacris' father and best friend Wayne Bridges as it is said at the end of the video. In the scene where Ludacris is working out he is seen wearing a fan T-shirt of the Paratroopers Brigade of the Israel Defense Forces.

== Usage in television ==
"Slap" first gained media attention after Fox News conservative commentator Bill O'Reilly criticized the lyrical content of the song (which uses the word "nigga" forty times, although it is only used as a repeated element of the chorus, also the anti-Bush lyrical content) in his television program. He stated that Ludacris should have not won the Grammy Award for Best Rap Album in the 49th ceremony (that took place a day earlier, on February 11, 2007) because of the song.

== Credits and personnel ==
The credits for "Slap" are adapted from the liner notes of Release Therapy.

Recording

- Recorded at: The Ludaplex in Atlanta, Georgia and Nasty's Crib and The Field, both in Orlando, Florida.

Personnel

- Ludacris – vocals, songwriting
- The Runners – producers
- Johnny Mollings – songwriting
- Lenny Mollings – songwriting, recording, guitar
- Andrew Harr – songwriting
- Jermaine Jackson – songwriting
- Misty Fluellen – additional vocals
- Joshua Monroy – recording
- Dru Harr – recording
- Mayne – all instruments
- Phil Tan – mixing
- Josh Houghkirk – additional engineering
- Bernie Grundman – mastering

== Charts ==
Chart (2007)	Peak position
US Bubbling Under Hot 100 (Billboard)	13
US Hot R&B/Hip-Hop Songs (Billboard)	56
US Hot Rap Songs (Billboard)	21
US Rhythmic Airplay (Billboard)	34
