= Tical 0: The Prequel =

Studio album by Method Man
- Released: May 18, 2004
- Recorded: 2003–2004
- Genre: Hip hop
- Length: 55:11
- Label: Def Jam
- Producers: Sean "Puffy" Combs; DJ Scratch; Mr. Porter; RZA; No I.D.; Rick Rock; Rockwilder; Yogi; Rich Mae; Tony Dofat; Lee Stone; Nashiem Myrick; Boogz; DJ Fafu; Jelly Roll; E3; Self; Scott Storch; Q

Method Man chronology
Blackout! (1999)	Tical 0: The Prequel (2004)	4:21... The Day After (2006)

Wu-Tang Clan solo chronology
The Pretty Toney Album (2004)	Tical 0: The Prequel (2004)	No Said Date (2004)

Singles from Tical 0: The Prequel
- 1. "What's Happenin'" Released: March 30, 2004; 2. "The Show" Released: September 14, 2004

Tical 0: The Prequel is the third studio album by American rapper Method Man, released on May 18, 2004, by Def Jam Recordings.

Upon its release, Tical 0: The Prequel debuted at number two on the Billboard 200 chart, and was certified gold by the RIAA on July 14, 2004. The album received mostly mixed reviews from critics who criticized its lack of cohesiveness, production, and overall sound.

== Background ==
Tical 0: The Prequel experienced over three years of delays before it was ultimately released. The album was originally scheduled for a December 19, 2000 release (as found in the booklet for Ja Rule's Rule 3:36 album), but was delayed. It was then scheduled for an October 28, 2003 release (as found in the booklet for DMX's Grand Champ), but was again delayed. Tical 0: The Prequel was ultimately released on May 18, 2004.

The album features production from Sean "Puffy" Combs, Rockwilder, and Mr. Porter, among others, as well as guest appearances including Redman, Missy Elliott, Snoop Dogg, Ludacris, and various other Wu-Tang affiliates. Method Man would later voice his displeasure with the album, stating "On the third LP, it was suggested to bring in Harve Pierre and P Diddy. Who am I to argue? Puff knows how to sell some records. But that wasn't the direction to go in, and I know that now."

== Critical reception ==
Professional ratings
Aggregate scores
Source	Rating
Metacritic	51/100
Review scores
Source	Rating
AllMusic	2/5 stars
Blender	3/5 stars
Entertainment Weekly	C+
Mojo	3/5 stars
Q	4/5 stars
Rolling Stone	2/5 stars
The Rolling Stone Album Guide	2.5/5 stars
Spin	B
Stylus Magazine	F
Vibe	2.5/5 stars

Tical 0: The Prequel garnered mixed reviews from music critics who felt it lacked cohesiveness in its production and Meth's lyricism. At Metacritic, which assigns a normalized rating out of 100 to reviews from mainstream critics, the album received an average score of 51, based on 13 reviews.

Chris Ryan from Spin gave praise to Meth's signature hook-filled delivery being utilized well on the various "tried-and-true rap templates" throughout the track listing, highlighting his Wu-Tang features with RZA and Ghostface Killah. Vibe writer Damien Lemon found Meth's usual brand of lyrical bars to be of diminished quality and that the only things keeping the record together are the quality beats from Rick Rock, P. Diddy and Dofat, and the collaborations with Ghostface Killah ("Afterparty") and Busta Rhymes ("What's Happenin'"). AllMusic's Andy Kellman saw the album as having even lower interest to attract listeners than the similar but more ambitious Tical 2000, criticizing the overabundance of guest artists and producers for making the listening experience feel "unfocused and disjointed, not diverse and well-rounded" despite commending Meth for retaining his charismatic personality and strong lyricism, concluding that "[A]s an MC, he's had nothing to prove for quite some time. Give or take a couple hot tracks, this release is not likely to play a significant role in his legacy." Rolling Stone's Peter Relic felt the record lacked the "astro-black ambition" that encapsulated previous Tical installments and found Meth's stoner persona devolved into a "leering grotesque of his former menacing self", saying "Tical 0 finds the thirty-three-year-old still stuck spinning doughnuts in a cul-de-sac of blunts." Scott McKeating of Stylus Magazine was heavily critical towards the album, noting the "scattered production styles" and featured guests making Meth's performance feel lacklustre, and the overall concept lacking focus due to studio interference concluding that, "There’s probably an OK Tical 0 that you could Frankenstein together from the leftovers and leaks, but he wasn’t anywhere near interested or prepared to make this album; it’s a bloody mess."

== Track listing ==
Credits adapted from the album's liner notes.

No.	Title	Writer(s)	Producer(s)	Length
1.	"Intro" (featuring RZA)	Robert Fitzgerald Diggs; Jeremy Graham	Yogi; Rich Mae^{[a]}	1:01
2.	"The Prequel" (featuring Streetlife)	Clifford Smith, Jr.; Patrick Charles; Ricardo Thomas	Rick Rock	2:07
3.	"Say What" (featuring Missy Elliott)	C. Smith, Jr.; Melissa Arnette Elliott; Tony Dofat; Sean John Combs; Christopher Edward Martin; Kendrick Jeru Davis; Fred Lee Scruggs Jr.; Tyrone Taylor; Kirk Jones; Sheldon Manne; James Baker; Lotte Wiggins; Melvin Wilson	Tony Dofat; Sean "P. Diddy" Combs	4:11
4.	"What's Happenin'" (featuring Busta Rhymes)	C. Smith, Jr.; Trevor George Smith Jr.; George Spivey; Anand Bakshi; Rahul Dev Burman	DJ Scratch	3:52
5.	"The Motto"	C. Smith, Jr.; Nashiem Myrick; Lee Stone	Nashiem Myrick; Lee Stone	3:24
6.	"We Some Dogs" (featuring Mr. Porter, Redman, and Snoop Dogg)	C. Smith, Jr.; Denaun Montez Porter; Reginald Noble; Calvin Cordozar Broadus Jr.; Michael Chavarria	Mr. Porter	4:30
7.	"The Turn" (featuring Raekwon)	C. Smith, Jr.; Corey Woods; Diggs; William Davidson; Michael Davies; John Kenneth Goodison; Anthony Toby Hiller	RZA	3:01
8.	"Tease" (featuring Chinky)	C. Smith, Jr.; Talia Burgess; Ernest Dion Wilson; Pearl Williams; Lenny Williams; Michael Bennett	No I.D.	4:50
9.	"Rodeo" (featuring Ludacris)	C. Smith, Jr.; Christopher Brian Bridges; Jahmal "Boogz" Gwin; Betty Gray Mabry	Boogz	2:57
10.	"Baby Come On" (featuring Kardinal Offishall)	C. Smith, Jr.; Jason Drew Harrow; Marc Pfafflin	DJ Fafu	4:01
11.	"Who Ya Rollin Wit" (featuring Streetlife)	C. Smith, Jr.; Charles; David Drew; Raheem Buggs	Jelly Roll	4:26
12.	"Never Hold Back" (featuring E3 and Saukrates)	C. Smith, Jr.; Ellis Hall; Karl Amani Wailoo	E3	3:05
13.	"The Show"	C. Smith, Jr.; Edward Hinson; Martin Deller; Cameron Hawkins; Benjamin Mink	Self Service	2:30
14.	"Act Right"	C. Smith, Jr.; Dana Stinson	Rockwilder	3:17
15.	"Afterparty" (featuring Ghostface Killah)	C. Smith, Jr.; Dennis David Coles; Qur'an Goodman; Cleveland Horne; Joseph Pruitt; Abrim Tilmon	Q	3:12
16.	"Crooked Letter I" (featuring Streetlife and Mr. Porter)	C. Smith, Jr.; Charles; Porter; Mike Chavarria	Mr. Porter	3:48
17.	"Ridin' for Outro" (performed by Black Ice)	Lamar Manson; J. Graham	Yogi; Rich Mae^{[a]}	1:01
Total length:				55:11

Japanese bonus tracks
No.	Title	Writer(s)	Producer(s)	Length
18.	"Uh Huh"	C. Smith, Jr.	Nottz	4:25
19.	"Let's Do It" (featuring Redman)	C. Smith, Jr.; Noble; Scott Spencer Storch	Scott Storch	4:35
Total length:				64:11

Notes

- ^{^[a]} signifies a co-producer

Sample credits

- "Say What" contains interpolations of "Come Clean", written by Chris Martin, Kendrick Davis, Fred Scruggs, Tyrone Taylor, Kirk Jones, and Shelly Manne. It also contains a sample from "Patiently", written by James Baker, Lotte Wiggins, and Melvin Wilson, as performed by New Birth.
- "What's Happenin'" contains a sample of "Dum Maro Dum", written by Anand Bakshi and R. D. Burman, as performed by Asha Bhosle.
- "The Turn" contains a sample from "Where Are You Going To My Love?", written by William Davidson, Michael Davies, John Goodison, and Anthony Hiller, as performed by The Miracles.
- "Tease" contains a sample from "Cause I Love You", written by Lenny Williams and Michael Bennett, as performed by Lenny Williams.
- "Rodeo" contains a sample from "If I'm In Luck I Might Get Picked Up", written by Betty Mabry, as performed by Betty Davis.
- "The Show" contains a sample of "Nothing At All", written by Martin Deller, Cameron Hawkins, and Ben Mink, as performed by FM.
- "Afterparty" contains a sample of "I Just Don't Know About This Girl", written by Cleveland Horne, Joseph Pruitt, and Abrim Tilmon, as performed by The Detroit Emeralds.

== Personnel ==
Credits for Tical 0: The Prequel adapted from AllMusic.

- Method Man – executive producer
- Kevin Liles – executive producer
- Harve Pierre – A&R direction
- Tina M. Davis – A&R
- Mark Brown – A&R
- Folayan Knight – A&R
- Tyson Davis – A&R coordinator
- Patrick "Plain Pat" Reynolds – A&R administrator
- Tony Vanias – recording administrator
- Chris Athens – mastering
- Shante Bacon – marketing
- James Ellis – management
- Dawud S. West – art direction, design and graffiti
- James Porto – cover illustration
- Vurv Inc. – phoenix logo
- Matt Doyle – photography
- Walik Goshorn – bus photo
- Jennifer L. Justice – legal counsel
- Randy "Mac" McMillan – business affairs
- Antoinette Trotman – business affairs
- Ian Allen – business affairs
- Chris Kellam – engineer
- Deborah Mannis-Gardner – sample clearance agent

== Charts and certifications ==
=== Weekly charts ===
Chart (2004)	Peak position
Australian Albums (ARIA)	81
Austrian Albums (Ö3 Austria)	60
Belgian Albums (Ultratop Flanders)	75
Belgian Albums (Ultratop Wallonia)	86
Canadian Albums (Billboard)	3
Canadian R&B Albums (Nielsen SoundScan)	1
Dutch Albums (Album Top 100)	67
French Albums (SNEP)	16
German Albums (Offizielle Top 100)	22
Swiss Albums (Schweizer Hitparade)	7
UK Albums (Official Charts)	29
US Billboard 200	2
US Top R&B/Hip-Hop Albums (Billboard)	1

=== Certifications ===
Region	Certification	Certified units/sales
United States (RIAA)	Gold	500,000^{^}
^{^} Shipments figures based on certification alone.

=== Year-end charts ===
Chart (2004)	Position
US Billboard 200	154
US Top R&B/Hip-Hop Albums (Billboard)	66

== See also ==
- List of Billboard number-one R&B albums of 2004
