= What's Happenin' (Method Man song) =

2004 single by Method Man featuring Busta Rhymes

Single by Method Man featuring Busta Rhymes

from the album Tical 0: The Prequel
- Released: March 30, 2004
- Genre: Hip hop
- Length: 3:52
- Label: Def Jam
- Songwriters: Clifford Smith Jr.; Trevor Smith Jr.; George Spivey; Anand Bakshi; R. D. Burman
- Producer: DJ Scratch

Method Man singles chronology
"Love @ 1st Sight" (2003)	"What's Happenin'" (2004)	"The Show" (2004)

Busta Rhymes singles chronology
"Keep Doin' It" (2004)	"What's Happenin'" (2004)	"Don't Cha" (2005)

Music video
- "What's Happenin'" on YouTube

"What's Happenin'" is a song by American rapper Method Man, released on March 30, 2004 as the lead single from his third studio album Tical 0: The Prequel (2004). It features American rapper Busta Rhymes and was produced by DJ Scratch. The song contains a sample of "Dum Maro Dum" by Asha Bhosle.

== Composition ==
"What's Happenin'" has been considered a more "radio-ready", "club-friendly" song among Method Man's music. It sees Method Man and Busta Rhymes delivering party-themed rhymes over a sample of a "fuzzy, muddled bass line" from "Dum Maro Dum".

== Critical reception ==
Scott McKeating of Stylus Magazine commented "The initially disappointment of lead single 'What's Happenin?' ended up becoming a grower, but it's definitely more of a typical Busta type track with its 'WHUT!' chorus." Mitch Findlay of HotNewHipHop wrote that "The pair are well-matched, with Meth's cool charisma striking a match and Busta Rhyme's madcap energy serving as the fuel", additionally remarking that the song "has aged particularly gracefully, sounding almost fresh despite its raw aesthetic. The premise is simple: two veteran emcees going back and forth in the name of fun and sport, a pickup game that rises in competitive intensity with every taunt."

== Charts ==
Chart (2004)	Peak position
Germany (GfK)	82
UK Singles (OCC)	17
US Hot R&B/Hip-Hop Songs (Billboard)	65
