= Teen Choice Award for Choice Music – R&B/Hip-Hop Artist =

Entertainment award category

The following is a list of Teen Choice Award winners and nominees for Choice R&B/Hip-Hop Artist. From 2003 to 2010 and 2013, the category is awarded as two separate categories: Choice R&B Artist and Choice Hip-Hop Artist.

== Winners and nominees ==
=== 2000s ===
Year	Winner	Nominees	Ref.
2001	Shaggy	Missy Elliott; Eminem; Eve; Jay Z; Mystikal; Nelly; OutKast	
2002	Usher	Mary J. Blige; Eve; Ja Rule; Alicia Keys; Ludacris; Nelly; P. Diddy	
2003	Choice R&B/Hip-Hop Artist		
2003	Jennifer Lopez	B2K; Brandy; Sean Paul; Kelly Rowland; Justin Timberlake; Tyrese; Usher	
2003	Choice Rap Artist		
2003	Eminem	50 Cent; Missy Elliott; Ja Rule; Jay Z; Nas; Nelly; Snoop Dogg	
2004	Choice R&B Artist		
2004	Usher	Beyoncé; The Black Eyed Peas; Alicia Keys; Sean Paul; Justin Timberlake; Kanye West; Mario Winans	
2004	Choice Rap Artist		
2004	D12	Cassidy; Chingy; Missy Elliott; J-Kwon; Jay Z; Ludacris; Twista	
2005	Choice R&B Artist		
2005	Mariah Carey	Ciara; Fantasia; Alicia Keys; John Legend; Mario; Omarion; Usher	
2005	Choice Rap Artist		
2005	Eminem	50 Cent; The Game; Jay Z; Lil Jon; Ludacris; Snoop Dogg; Kanye West	
2006	Choice R&B Artist		
2006	Rihanna	Mary J. Blige; Chris Brown; Mariah Carey; Jamie Foxx; Ne-Yo	
2006	Choice Rap Artist		
2006	The Black Eyed Peas	Missy Elliott; Sean Paul; T.I.; Paul Wall; Kanye West	
2007	Choice R&B Artist		
2007	Rihanna	Akon; Beyoncé; Chris Brown; Ne-Yo	
2007	Choice Rap Artist		
2007	Timbaland	Fabolous; Ludacris; T.I.; Young Jeezy	
2008	Choice R&B Artist		
2008	Chris Brown	Beyoncé; Rihanna; T-Pain; Usher	
2008	Choice Rap Artist		
2008	Lil Wayne	Flo Rida; Lil Mama; Lupe Fiasco; Kanye West	
2009	Choice R&B Artist		
2009	Beyoncé	Jamie Foxx; Jennifer Hudson; Ne-Yo; T-Pain	
2009	Choice Rap Artist		
2009	Kanye West	Bow Wow; Lil Wayne; Soulja Boy; T.I.	

=== 2010s ===
Year	Winner	Nominees	Ref.
2010	Choice R&B Artist		
2010	Beyoncé	Alicia Keys; Rihanna; Trey Songz; Usher	
2010	Choice Rap Artist		
2010	Eminem	Drake; Jay Z; Ludacris; Pitbull	
2011	Eminem	Lupe Fiasco; Nicki Minaj; Pitbull; Kanye West	
2012	Nicki Minaj	Beyoncé; Flo Rida; Pitbull; Kanye West	
2013	Choice R&B Artist		
2013	Bruno Mars	Beyoncé; Alicia Keys; Miguel; Trey Songz	
2013	Choice Hip-Hop/Rap Artist		
2013	Macklemore & Ryan Lewis	Drake; Nicki Minaj; Pitbull; Kanye West	
2014	Iggy Azalea	Eminem; John Legend; Nicki Minaj; Justin Timberlake	
2015	Nicki Minaj	Iggy Azalea; Drake; The Weeknd; Kanye West; Wiz Khalifa	
2016	Beyoncé	Iggy Azalea; Jason Derulo; Drake; Nicki Minaj; The Weeknd	
2017	Beyoncé	Chance the Rapper; Drake; Kendrick Lamar; Nicki Minaj; Rihanna	
2018	Cardi B	Childish Gambino; Drake; Khalid; Nicki Minaj; Post Malone	
2019	Cardi B	Drake; Nicki Minaj; Normani; Post Malone; Travis Scott	
