= DJ Drama Presents: The Preview =

The Preview

Mixtape by Ludacris
- Released: July 28, 2008
- Genre: Hip-hop
- Producer: DJ Drama

DJ Drama Presents: The Preview is a mixtape by Ludacris and DJ Drama as promotion for Ludacris' album Theater of the Mind and his film releases in the fall of 2008. Ludacris wanted to create a mixtape that captured his image as a southern rapper and movie actor. The mixtape was released on July 28, 2008, at WeMix.com.

== Controversy ==
The song "Politics as Usual" has caused a lot controversy due to lyrics in the song criticizing and insulting Reverend Jesse Jackson ("Now Jesse talkin' slick and apologizin' for what?/If you said it then you meant it, how you want it? Head or gut?"), McCain ("McCain don't belong in any chair unless he's paralyzed"), President Bush ("Yeah I said it, 'cause Bush is mentally handicapped/Ball up all of his speeches and just throw 'em like candy wraps/'Cause what you talkin' I hear nothin' even relevant/And you the worst of all 43 presidents") and Hillary Clinton ("Hilary hated on you, so that bitch is irrelevant").

== Track listing ==
#	Title	Featured guest(s)	Producer(s)	Beat(s)	Time
1.	"And Starring..." (Intro)			"Little Child Running Wild" by Curtis Mayfield	1:45
2.	"Still Spittin'"		Salih Williams for Carnival Beats	"Still Tippin'" by Mike Jones	4:27
3.	"DTP Magic"	Willy Northpole	The Neptunes	"Blue Magic" by Jay-Z	4:40
4.	"Get Up Get Out"	Block Xchange	Organized Noize	"Git Up, Git Out" by OutKast	4:47
5.	"So Thoro"		Alchemist	"Keep It Thoro" by Prodigy	2:22
6.	"The Vocalizer" (Skit)				1:46
7.	"Bigg Ass House"		J. R. Rotem	"The Boss" by Rick Ross	3:23
8.	"2 Kings"	I-20	Mr. Lee	"3 Kings" By Slim Thug	3:09
9.	"Politics as Usual"		Polow da Don	"Get Buck" by Young Buck	2:14
10.	"Look What I Got"	Playaz Circle		Original Production	3:06
11.	"Pinky Shinin'"	Small World	Mr. Lee	Original Production	3:41
12.	"Sho'Nuff Revisited"	Lil' Fate	Jazze Pha	"Sho'Nuff" by Tela	3:52
13.	"Ordinary Negroes" (Interlude)		John Legend	"Ordinary People" by John Legend	2:43
14.	"Throw It Up"	Lil Wayne & Busta Rhymes	Cool & Dre	Original Production	4:22
15.	"Coogi Down"	La the Darkman & Willie The Kid			2:59
16.	"I'm a Dog"	Playaz Circle	DJ Paul & Juicy J	"I Got Dat Drank" by Frayser Boy	4:39
17.	"Smokin Big Kill"	Shawnna		"Wood Wheel" by UGK	2:38
18.	"Stay Together"		DJ Paul & Juicy J	Original Production	4:01
19.	"We Ain't Worried Bout You"		Scott Storch	Bonus Track from Japanese import of Release Therapy	3:28
20.	"Roll the Credits" (Outro)				0:20
21.	"Been Puttin On" / "Secret Song"		Drumma Boy/Jon Astley	"Put On" by Young Jeezy / "Sunglasses at Night" by Corey Hart	8:47
