= List of Billboard 200 number-one albums of 2004 =

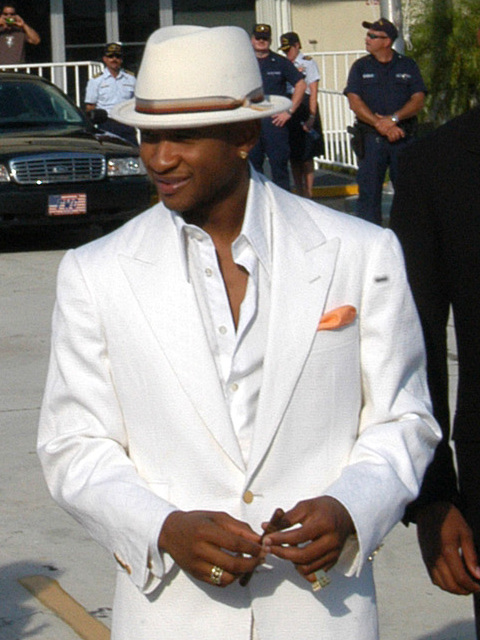
Usher's Confessions was the best-selling album of 2004.

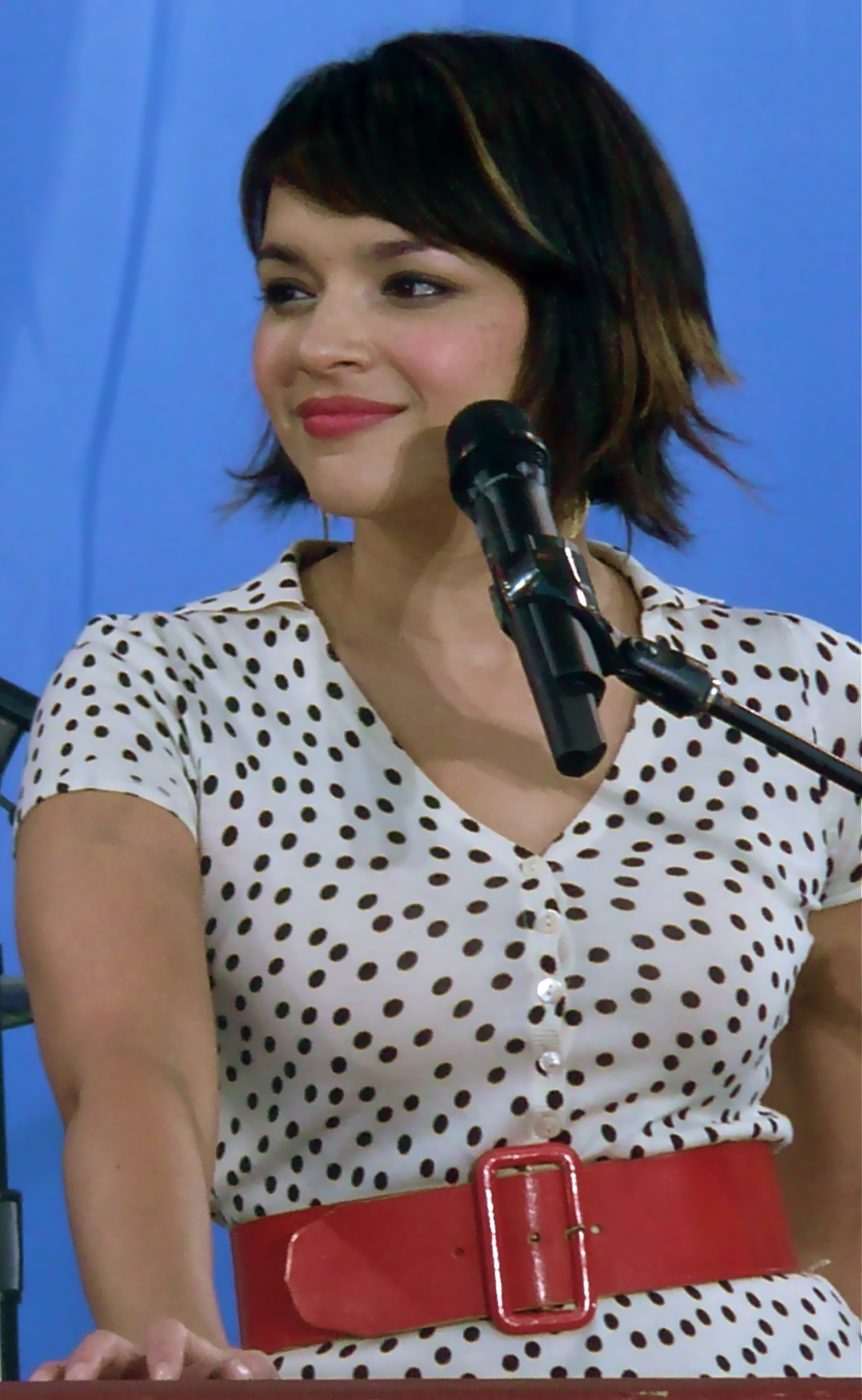
Feels Like Home by Norah Jones sold over a million copies in its first week.

The highest-selling albums and EPs in the United States are ranked in the Billboard 200, published by Billboard magazine. The data are compiled by Nielsen Soundscan based on each album's weekly physical sales.

In 2004, a total of 29 albums reached the #1 spot on the Billboard 200. R&B singer Usher's Confessions is the best-selling album of 2004, accumulating under eight million copies by the end of the year. The album debuted at number one on the Billboard 200 with sales of 1.096 million copies in the United States, breaking the record for the best opening sales week by an R&B act. Confessions gave Usher his first chart topper since he began releasing albums in the 1990s. Singer Norah Jones' Feels Like Home sold 3.8 million units, ranking as the second best-selling album of 2004. Feels Like Home is noted for its debut sales figure of 1.02 million, the second highest in a week by a female artist, behind singer Britney Spears' Oops!... I Did It Again which debuted with 1.32 million in 2000.

== Chart history ==
Key
†	Indicates best performing album of 2004

Issue date	Album	Artist(s)	Sales	Ref.
January 3	The Diary of Alicia Keys	Alicia Keys	370,000	
January 10	Speakerboxxx/The Love Below	OutKast	374,000	
January 17	Speakerboxxx/The Love Below	OutKast	86,000	
January 24	Closer	Josh Groban	100,000	
January 31	Speakerboxxx/The Love Below	OutKast	97,000	
February 7	Speakerboxxx/The Love Below	OutKast	86,000	
February 14	Kamikaze	Twista	312,000	
February 21	When the Sun Goes Down	Kenny Chesney	550,000	
February 28	Feels Like Home	Norah Jones	1,020,000	
March 6	Feels Like Home	Norah Jones	395,000	
March 13	Feels Like Home	Norah Jones	280,000	
March 20	Feels Like Home	Norah Jones	204,000	
March 27	Feels Like Home	Norah Jones	183,000	
April 3	Feels Like Home	Norah Jones	147,000	
April 10	Confessions †	Usher	1,096,000	
April 17	Confessions †	Usher	486,000	
April 24	Confessions †	Usher	463,000	
May 1	Confessions †	Usher	302,000	
May 8	Confessions †	Usher	253,000	
May 15	D12 World	D12	545,000	
May 22	Confessions †	Usher	267,000	
May 29	Confessions †	Usher	227,000	
June 5	Confessions †	Usher	214,000	
June 12	Under My Skin	Avril Lavigne	381,000	
June 19	Confessions †	Usher	194,000	
June 26	Contraband	Velvet Revolver	256,000	
July 3	To the 5 Boroughs	Beastie Boys	360,000	
July 10	Kiss of Death	Jadakiss	246,000	
July 17	The Hunger For More	Lloyd Banks	434,000	
July 24	The Hunger For More	Lloyd Banks	164,000	
July 31	License to Chill	Jimmy Buffett	239,000	
August 7	Autobiography	Ashlee Simpson	398,000	
August 14	Now 16	Various Artists	504,000	
August 21	Autobiography	Ashlee Simpson	286,000	
August 28	Autobiography	Ashlee Simpson	263,000	
September 4	Now 16	Various Artists	207,000	
September 11	Live Like You Were Dying	Tim McGraw	766,000	
September 18	Live Like You Were Dying	Tim McGraw	227,000	
September 25	What I Do	Alan Jackson	178,000	
October 2	Suit	Nelly	396,000	
October 9	American Idiot	Green Day	267,000	
October 16	Feels Like Today	Rascal Flatts	201,000	
October 23	50 Number Ones	George Strait	343,000	
October 30	50 Number Ones	George Strait	190,000	
November 6	Stardust: The Great American Songbook, Volume III	Rod Stewart	240,000	
November 13	Unfinished Business	R. Kelly & Jay-Z	215,000	
November 20	Now 17	Various Artists	407,000	
November 27	Encore	Eminem	711,000	
December 4	Encore	Eminem	871,000	
December 11	How to Dismantle an Atomic Bomb	U2	840,000	
December 18	Collision Course	Jay-Z / Linkin Park	368,000	
December 25	The Red Light District	Ludacris	322,000	

== See also ==
- 2004 in music
- List of number-one albums (United States)
