= Sex Room =

Single by Ludacris featuring Trey Songz

from the album Battle of the Sexes
- Released: May 18, 2010
- Recorded: 2009
- Genre: Hip hop; R&B
- Length: 5:30 (album version)
- Label: DTP; Def Jam
- Songwriters: Christopher Bridges; Tremaine Neverson; Kriss Johnson; Troy Taylor; Tony Scales
- Producer: Kajun

Ludacris singles chronology
"Beamer, Benz, or Bentley (Remix)" (2010)	"Sex Room" (2010)	"Porn Star Dancing" (2010)

Trey Songz singles chronology
"We Got Hood Love" (2010)	"Sex Room" (2010)	"Already Taken" (2010)

"Sex Room" is a hip hop song recorded by American rapper Ludacris, released by Def Jam Recordings on May 18, 2010 as the third single from his seventh studio album, Battle of the Sexes (2010). It features guest vocals from R&B singer Trey Songz, who co-wrote the song with Chef Tone, Troy Taylor, and Ludacris himself. It was produced by Kajun and programmed by Polow da Don.

== Single release and chart performance ==
"Sex Room" debuted on the Billboard Hot R&B/Hip-Hop Songs chart at number 100 in the April 10, 2010 issue, eventually peaking at number 5 on July 10. It was originally supposed to be released to US radio stations on April 20, 2010. However, its release was pushed back to May 18, 2010, for undisclosed reasons. The single debuted at number 98 on the Billboard Hot 100 and has since reached number 69.

== Music video ==
The music video for "Sex Room" premiered on May 25, 2010 on MTV Jams. The video was directed by Chris Robinson. Ludacris confirmed that the video's plot would be similar that of the plot of the movie The Hangover.

== Charts ==
=== Weekly charts ===
Chart (2010)	Peak position
US Billboard Hot 100	69
US Hot R&B/Hip-Hop Songs (Billboard)	5
US Hot Rap Songs (Billboard)	6
US Rhythmic Airplay (Billboard)	39

=== Year-end charts ===
Chart (2010)	Position
US Hot R&B/Hip-Hop Songs (Billboard)	39
