= Battle of the Sexes (album) =

Studio album by Ludacris
- Released: March 9, 2010
- Genre: Hip-hop
- Length: 60:30
- Labels: Disturbing tha Peace; Ebony Son; Def Jam South
- Producers: Christopher "Ludacris" Bridges (exec.), Chaka Zulu (exec.), Jeff Dixon (exec.), T-Minus, Bangladesh, Swizz Beatz, The Neptunes, The Runners, Xcel, The Legendary Traxster, DJ Montay, B Crucial & Tony Dinero, Kajun, Infinity, Khao, Gaggie

Ludacris chronology
Theater of the Mind (2008)	Battle of the Sexes (2010)	Burning Bridges (2014)

Singles from Battle of the Sexes
- 1. "How Low" Released: December 8, 2009; 2. "My Chick Bad" Released: February 23, 2010; 3. "Sex Room" Released: May 18, 2010; 4. "Everybody Drunk" Released: September 24, 2010

Battle of the Sexes is the eighth studio album by American rapper Ludacris, released March 9, 2010 on Disturbing tha Peace and Def Jam South. The album was recorded during 2008 to 2010 and its production was handled by several producers, including T-Minus, Bangladesh, Swizz Beatz, The Neptunes, and The Runners.

Upon its release, Battle of the Sexes received generally positive reviews from most music critics.

== Background ==
Battle of the Sexes was tagged as a collaboration album by Ludacris and label-mate Shawnna. In April 2009, the promotional single titled "Everybody Drunk" which features vocals from Shawnna was released. Shawnna reportedly split from Disturbing tha Peace in 2009 and signed to Nappy Boy Entertainment. It was later reported that Shawnna was removed from the album and became a solo album by Ludacris with guest appearances.

== Recording ==
The album began recording in 2008. Ludacris stated he wanted the album to highlight different view points from males and females; several songs in which he recorded tracks with included artists such as: Nicki Minaj, Lil' Kim, Eve, Trina, Shawnna, Ciara, Ne-Yo, Monica, Flo Rida and Gucci Mane. Pharrell recorded with Ludacris and contributed production and vocals. Bangladesh, Swizz Beatz and J.U.S.T.I.C.E. League also contributed production to the album.

== Release and promotion ==
After several projected release dates, the album was finally released on March 9, 2010, through Disturbing tha Peace and its distributing label Def Jam Recordings. In April 2009, Ludacris released a promotional single for the album, titled "Everybody Drunk", which featured Shawnna. The single failed to chart, and though it appears on the album, the album version features new Disturbing tha Peace signee Lil Scrappy, instead of Shawnna. Official promotion for the album began when Ludacris debuted the first single "How Low" on October 10, 2009, when he performed it at the 2009 BET Hip-Hop Awards. It was made available for digital download on iTunes in December 2009. Ludacris next released three remixes to United States radio stations help promote the song. One of which features Ciara and Pitbull was made available on iTunes on February 9, 2010. He has also filmed a video for the album's second official single, "My Chick Bad" with female rapper Nicki Minaj, and the remix, which featured Eve, Diamond, and Trina. Shawnna provides "additional vocals" on the songs "I Do It All Night", "BOTS Radio" (featuring I-20), "Feelin' So Sexy", and the bonus track "Rollercoaster" (featuring Dru Hill).

=== Singles ===
- "How Low" was released as the first official single on December 8, 2009. It became a huge mainstream success, peaking at number six in the United States. It went on to achieve double platinum status.
- "My Chick Bad", which features Nicki Minaj, was released as the second official single on February 23, 2010. This single was also a big success, peaking at No. 11 in the United States and later also going double platinum.
- "Sex Room", which features Trey Songz, was released as the third single on May 18, 2010. On the week ending April 10, 2010, "Sex Room" debuted on the U.S. Billboard Hot R&B/Hip-Hop Songs at 28.
- In September 2010, Billboard announced that "Everybody Drunk" with Lil Scrappy, would be the next single. A video for the song was released on September 24, 2010.

Apart from its official singles, "Hey Ho", which features Lil' Kim and Lil Fate, was released as a promotional single prior to the release of the album on February 16, 2010, as part of iTunes' countdown to Battle of the Sexes and debuted at No. 8 on the Billboard Bubbling Under Hot 100.

== Critical reception ==
Professional ratings
Aggregate scores
Source	Rating
Metacritic	68/100
Review scores
Source	Rating
Allmusic	3/5 stars
The A.V. Club	B+
Entertainment Weekly	B−
Los Angeles Times	2.5/4 stars
Newsday	B
NOW	1/5 stars
RapReviews	(5.5/10)
USA Today	2.5/4 stars
XXL	(XL)

Upon its release, the album received generally positive reviews from most music critics, based on an aggregate score of 68/100 from Metacritic. Allmusic writer David Jeffries gave it 3 out of 5 stars and viewed it as a "porno-style album", stating "Limited and a little patched together, but if cheap thrills are what you’re after, this one puts the dirty back in dirty south". The A.V. Club's Nathan Rabin viewed its "R&B heavy" material as a weakness, but gave the album a B+ rating and praised Ludacris's lyricism, writing "Ludacris remains an underrated lyricist with unparalleled verbal dexterity. His liquid flow crams an awful lot of polysyllabic words into even the tawdriest sex jam, and no rapper alive conveys joy as effortlessly or infectiously". Giving it 2 1/2 out of 4 stars, Los Angeles Times critic August Brown called Battle of the Sexes "another welcome occasion to listen to Luda enjoying the real love of his life -- the sound of his own voice", and described its music as "fizzy pillow talk and respectfully tawdry club fodder". Despite viewing Ludacris's lyrics as from the male perspective, USA Today's Elysa Gardner commended him for his humor and wrote that the album is "more appealing, and more artful, when Ludacris directs his crude, breezy rhymes where they're best suited: into unabashed displays of loopy lust and boneheaded bravado". XXL writer Rondell Conway gave Battle of the Sexes an XL rating and shared a similar sentiment, stating "Luda may not have evened the playing field, but he certainly created an excellent musical forum for the sexes to air out their differences". Newsday's Glenn Gamboa gave the album a B rating and commended Ludacris for his musical balance, writing "Not only does Luda know when a song needs an R&B crooner or a female voice, he knows when he needs to speed up a flow or rough up a rhyme".

However, Sarah Godfrey of The Washington Post found its "sexed-up, party-oriented music - catchy but hardly groundbreaking" and viewed the female lyrical perspective as minimal, stating "There is plenty of fun happening on 'Battle of the Sexes', but still, the fellas clearly run it; the ladies are hardly even given a chance". NOW's Jason Richards gave the album 1 out of 5 stars and wrote "Battle seems like an opportunity for the rapper to be more ignorant than ever". HipHopDX writer Kathy Iandoli gave it 2 1/2 out of 5 stars and shared a similar sentiment, calling it "an idea that lost momentum somewhere in the middle of its inception, and the result is a haphazard collection of cuts with no clear direction". Jesal Padania of RapReviews gave Battle of the Sexes a 5.5/10 rating and perceived its lyrics as "instantly forgettable". The Harvard Crimson's Araba A. Appiagyei-Dankah gave it 2 1/2 out of 5 stars and wrote "When the album remembers to be a “battle” rather than an endless string of mildly memorable dance tunes and awkward sex songs, it presents a one-sided and misogynistic view of women". Despite noting that "there really isn't much of a battle at all", Exclaim!'s Neil Acharya commended Ludacris for his performance on the album, stating "he seems content to do what he does best: make a pretty run-of-the-mill topic enjoyable with his off-kilter humour and exceptional flow". The Boston Globe writer Ken Capobianco called it "a riotous, raucous set" and wrote favorably of Ludacris's "good-humoured" lyrics. Entertainment Weekly's Simon Vozick-Levinson gave Battle of the Sexes a B− rating and expressed a mixed response towards its themes, but commended Ludacris for his rapping, stating "his gymnastic flow and irrepressible personality redeem more tracks than not".

== Commercial performance ==
The album debuted at number one on Billboard 200, selling 137,300 copies in its first week. This makes it Ludacris' fourth #1 album. In its second week, it dropped to No. 2, selling 61,200 copies. In its third week, the album dropped to No. 6, moving 45,000 units. In its fourth week the album sold 40,000 units. The fifth week it sold 25,000 more copies. It has spent six straight weeks at the top of the Top Rap Albums chart. As of March 16, 2015, the album has sold 632,000 copies in the United States. The album was certified gold by the Recording Industry Association of America in June 2010.

== Track listing ==
Battle of the Sexes track listing
No.	Title	Writer(s)	Length
1.	"Intro"	Christopher Bridges; Bryant Bell	1:28
2.	"How Low" (featuring Shawnna)	Bridges; Tyler Williams; Carlton Ridenhour^{[a]}; Eric Sadler^{[a]}; Hank Shocklee^{[a]}	3:21
3.	"My Chick Bad" (featuring Nicki Minaj)	Bridges; Onika Maraj; Derrelle Davidson; Samuel Lindley	3:36
4.	"Everybody Drunk" (featuring Lil Scrappy)	Bridges; Darryl Richardson III; Montay Humphrey; Shondrae Crawford^{[a]}; Marlon Goodwin^{[a]}; Premo Smith^{[a]}	4:10
5.	"I Do It All Night"	Bridges; Rashawnna Guy; Brian Morton; Tony Ratliff	4:41
6.	"Sex Room" (featuring Trey Songz)	Bridges; Tremaine Neverson; Kriss Johnson; Tony Scales; Troy Taylor	5:30
7.	"I Know You Got a Man" (featuring Flo Rida and Ester Dean)	Bridges; Tramar Dillard; Esther Dean; Jordan Suecof; Roland Bautista^{[a]}; Darryl Gibson^{[a]}; Janice-Marie Johnson^{[a]}; Byron Miller^{[a]}	4:03
8.	"Hey Ho" (featuring Fate Wilson and Lil' Kim)	Bridges; Kimberly Jones; Kevin Cates; Christopher Stewart^{[a]}; Terius Nash^{[a]}	4:12
9.	"Party No Mo'" (featuring Gucci Mane)	Bridges; Crawford; Calvin Ewings^{[b]}	4:21
10.	"B.O.T.S. Radio" (featuring I-20 and Shawnna)	Bridges; Bobby Sandimanie; Guy; Andrew Harr; Jermaine Jackson	4:56
11.	"Can't Live with You" (featuring Monica)	Bridges; Cates; Marcus Allen; Johntá Austin	4:19
12.	"Feelin' So Sexy"	Bridges; Guy; Steven Smith; Fabrice Dumont^{[a]}^{[b]}; Stephane Haeri^{[a]}^{[b]}; Christophe Hetier^{[a]}^{[b]}; Angela McCluskey^{[a]}^{[b]}	3:29
13.	"Tell Me a Secret" (featuring Ne-Yo)	Bridges; Shaffer Smith; Loren Dawson; Kasseem Dean	4:18
14.	"My Chick Bad (Remix)" (featuring Diamond, Trina, and Eve)	Bridges; Davidson; Lindley	3:23
Total length:			55:47

Bonus track
No.	Title	Writer(s)	Length
15.	"Sexting"	Bridges; Pharrell Williams	4:43
Total length:			60:30

Deluxe edition bonus tracks
No.	Title	Writer(s)	Length
16.	"How Low (Remix)" (featuring Ciara and Pitbull)	Bridges; T. Williams; Ridenhour^{[a]}; Sadler^{[a]}; Shocklee^{[a]}	3:53
17.	"Rollercoaster" (featuring Dru Hill and Shawnna)	Bridges; Guy; Crawford; Ewings	5:18
Total length:			69:41

iTunes deluxe edition bonus videos
No.	Title	Director(s)	Length
18.	"How Low"	Dave Meyers	3:53
19.	"My Chick Bad"	Taj	5:18
Total length:			69:41

Notes

- ^{^[a]} signifies a songwriter from a sample.
- ^{^[b]} signifies a songwriter that is only listed on digital editions of the album.

Sample credits

- "How Low" contains samples of "Bring the Noise", written by Carl Ridenhour, Eric Sadler, and Hank Shocklee, as performed by Public Enemy.
- "Everybody Drunk" contains a sample of "You Don't Want Drama", written by Shondrae Crawford, Marlon Goodwin, and Premro Smith, as performed by 8Ball & MJG.
- "I Know You Got a Man" contains elements of "I Got a Man", written by Roland Bautista, Darryl Gibson, Janice-Marie Johnson, and Byron Miller, as performed by Positive K.
- "Hey Ho" contains interpolations of "W.F.Y.", written by Christopher Stewart and Terius Nash, as performed by Electrik Red.
- "Feelin' So Sexy" contains a sample of "Don't Look Back", written by Fabrice Dumont, Stephane Haeri, Christophe Hetier, and Angela McCluskey, as performed by Télépopmusik featuring Angela McCluskey.

== Personnel ==
Credits adapted from Tidal.

- Kevin Cates – production (8, 11)
- Bangladesh – production (9, 17)
- T-Minus – production (2, 16)
- The Legendary Traxster – production (3, 14)
- Xcel – production (1)
- DJ Montay – production (4)
- B-Crucial – production (5)
- Tony Dinero – production (5)
- Kajun – production (6)
- Infinity – production (7)
- The Runners – production (10)
- Gaggie – production (12)
- Swizz Beatz – production (13)
- The Neptunes – production (15)
- Marcus Allen – co-production (11)

== Charts ==
=== Weekly charts ===
Weekly chart performance for Battle of the Sexes
Chart (2010)	Peak position
Canadian Albums (Billboard)	17
Swiss Albums (Schweizer Hitparade)	82
UK Albums (Official Charts)	58
UK R&B Albums (Official Charts)	14
US Billboard 200	1
US Top R&B/Hip-Hop Albums (Billboard)	1
US Top Rap Albums (Billboard)	1

=== Year-end charts ===
Year-end chart performance for Battle of the Sexes
Chart (2010)	Position
US Billboard 200	45
US Top R&B/Hip-Hop Albums (Billboard)	13

== Certifications ==
Certifications for Battle of the Sexes
Region	Certification	Certified units/sales
United States (RIAA)	Platinum	1,000,000^{‡}
^{‡} Sales+streaming figures based on certification alone.

== See also ==
- List of Billboard 200 number-one albums of 2010
