= Release Therapy =

Studio album by Ludacris
- Released: September 26, 2006
- Studios: The Ludaplex in Atlanta, Georgia
- Genre: Hip-hop
- Length: 62:38
- Labels: DTP; Ebony Son; Def Jam South
- Producers: Ludacris (exec.), Chaka Zulu (exec.), Jeff Dixon (exec.), The Neptunes, The Trak Starz, Dre & Vidal, DJ Toomp, Rich Skillz, The Runners, Polow da Don

Ludacris chronology
The Red Light District (2004)	Release Therapy (2006)	Theater of the Mind (2008)

Singles from Release Therapy
- 1. "Money Maker" Released: July 17, 2006; 2. "Grew Up a Screw Up" Released: October 31, 2006; 3. "Runaway Love" Released: February 12, 2007; 4. "Girls Gone Wild" Released: May 24, 2007; 5. "Slap" Released: August 28, 2007

Release Therapy is the sixth studio album by American rapper Ludacris. It was released on September 26, 2006, under Disturbing tha Peace and Def Jam South. Production for the album was done by The Neptunes, The Trak Starz, Dre & Vidal, DJ Toomp, The Runners and Polow da Don, and features guest contributions from rappers Young Jeezy, Field Mob, Beanie Sigel, Pimp C and C-Murder and R&B singers Pharrell, Mary J. Blige, R. Kelly and Bobby Valentino.

Release Therapy garnered a generally mixed reception from critics unsure of Ludacris' exploration into more serious content after previous works being more lighthearted and party-filled. The album debuted at number one on the Billboard 200 chart, with sales of 309,000 copies in its first week, and spawned three singles: "Money Maker", "Grew Up a Screw Up" and "Runaway Love". The record received a Grammy Award for Best Rap Album and its lead single "Money Maker" won Best Rap Song at the 49th Annual Grammy Awards in 2007.

== Background ==
Release Therapy won the Best Rap Album award for the 2007 Grammy Awards.

Ludacris also shaved his cornrows off for a new "caesar" haircut. He said with a new album that was different than his other four albums, there would be a new haircut and a new personality to go with it, similar to what Busta Rhymes did with The Big Bang.

Ludacris released a mixtape called Pre-Release Therapy with DJ Green Lantern and Michael '5000' Watts to precede the album.

== Concept ==
Unlike the previous albums released by Ludacris, Release Therapy has a more mature and serious approach to the music (e.g. the 3rd single "Runaway Love" is Ludacris' first stab at socially concerned music). It is also Ludacris' darkest album to date, both in mood and subject matter. The different approach Ludacris took with Release Therapy has caused many listeners and fans to debate on whether the album is Ludacris's best or worst.

Ludacris also stated that his new album will be somewhat like a tape on CD. "The way we're going to try to format the record is you have your Release side and your Therapy side," he said. "Everybody knows the Release side would be 'War With God,' 'Tell It Like It Is.' I have a record called 'Slap.' Just getting everything off my chest. The Therapy side would be feel-good — a song like 'Woozy' with R. Kelly on it is therapeutic. Even 'Money Maker.' Some women's therapy is getting out, going to the club and shaking they ass. It's therapeutic to them."

== Singles ==
- The first single, "Money Maker", was produced by and features Pharrell Williams. It was released to U.S. radio outlets on July 17, 2006. It became Ludacris' second song to peak the Billboard Hot 100, and did so on the Hot R&B/Hip-Hop Songs, Hot Rap Songs and the Hot 100 Airplay charts. It won Best Rap Song at the 49th Annual Grammy Awards, becoming Ludacris' second Grammy Award.
- The second single, "Grew Up a Screw Up", features fellow Georgia-based rapper Young Jeezy. This collaboration disproved rumors that the artists shared animosity.
- The third single, "Runaway Love", features R&B singer Mary J. Blige and was produced by Polow da Don. It peaked at number two on the Billboard Hot 100.

== Critical reception ==
Professional ratings
Aggregate scores
Source	Rating
Metacritic	60/100
Review scores
Source	Rating
AllMusic	3/5 stars
The A.V. Club	B
Robert Christgau	(2-star Honorable Mention)
Entertainment Weekly	B−
The Guardian	3/5 stars
Pitchfork	5.8/10
RapReviews	8.5/10
Rolling Stone	3/5 stars
Stylus Magazine	B−
XXL	4/5 stars

Release Therapy received generally mixed reviews from music critics divided over Ludacris' foray into more conscious rap territory while still being able to deliver mainstream hip-hop content. At Metacritic, which assigns a normalized rating out of 100 to reviews from mainstream critics, the album received an average score of 60, based on 21 reviews.

In a review for The A.V. Club, writer Nathan Rabin called it "Ludacris' most mature album to date", praising the wordy and energetic party tracks and the surprising foray into introspection later on, concluding that "Always good but seldom great, Release Therapy is the rare major-label rap album that suffers from too much substance. Lyrically and thematically, Ludacris is growing up, so perhaps it's inevitable that he's incurring some growing pains along the way." Robert Christgau gave the album a two-star honorable mention, indicating a "likable effort that consumers attuned to its overriding aesthetic or individual vision may well enjoy." He cited "Tell It Like It Is", "Mouths to Feed" and "Slap" as highlights of Ludacris' transition into more mature content while maintaining his humorous side: "Rap porn clown as rap businessman, a richer choice thematically than rap entertainment mogul or rap crime boss." Brett Johnson of XXL gave praise to Ludacris for having a balanced track list containing his trademark humorous party jams and newfound sociopolitical commentary cuts, calling it "a solid album short on obvious club bangers but long on the more worldly perspective of a rap veteran."

Marisa Brown of AllMusic commended the 'Therapy' half of the album but felt that the 'Release' portion of the tracks was missing some humor, saying that "the witty rhymes that made Chicken-n-Beer so great are in short supply." Entertainment Weekly's Michael Endelman was the opposite in his critique of the record, praising Ludacris for maintaining his lyrical humor and dexterity on tracks like "Ultimate Satisfaction" and "Grew Up a Screw Up", but was less positive towards his attempts at depth on "Runaway Love" and "Do Your Time", saying that "[T]hough well-intentioned, they come across as trite." Pitchfork writer Tom Breihan felt the album was overhyped due to various interviews of Ludacris calling it a classic, resulting in a project with a weak track list structure, diluted punchlines and poor attempts at conscious rap. He gave faint praise to Release Therapy as being "Luda's best album since Back for the First Time, but it's not like that's saying much."

== Commercial performance ==
Release Therapy debuted at number one on the US Billboard 200 chart, selling over 309,000 copies in the first week, making it Ludacris' third number one album in a row. By February 2013, the album has sold about 1.3 million copies domestically.

== Track listing ==
Release Therapy track listing
No.	Title	Writer(s)	Producer(s)	Length
1.	"Warning" (Intro)	Christopher Bridges; Matthew McAllister	Vudu	2:30
2.	"Grew Up a Screw Up" (featuring Young Jeezy)	Bridges; Jay Jenkins; Johnny Mollings; Lenny Mollings; Osten Harvey Jr.; Marshall Mathers; Luis Resto; Tupac Shakur; Christopher Wallace; Edgar Winter	DJ Nasty & LVM	3:59
3.	"Money Maker" (featuring Pharrell)	Bridges; Pharrell Williams	The Neptunes	3:50
4.	"Girls Gone Wild"	Bridges; Williams; Chad Hugo	The Neptunes	3:36
5.	"Ultimate Satisfaction" (featuring Field Mob)	Bridges; Shawn Johnson; Darion Crawford; Richard Velonskis; Alessandro Benassi	Rich Skillz	4:20
6.	"Mouths to Feed"	Bridges; Aldrin Davis	DJ Toomp	4:18
7.	"End of the Night" (featuring Bobby Valentino)	Bridges; Nathan Perez	Happy Perez	4:37
8.	"Woozy" (featuring R. Kelly)	Bridges; Robert Kelly; Kendall Johnson	Ken Jo	5:18
9.	"Tell It Like It Is"	Bridges; Sidney Brown	Omen	3:56
10.	"War with God"	Bridges; Andre Harris; Vidal Davis; Alexander Chiger; Harry Zelnick; Leon Huff; Kenny Gamble	Dre & Vidal; Don Cheegro^{[a]}; Dirty Harry^{[a]}	4:30
11.	"Do Your Time" (featuring Beanie Sigel, Pimp C & C-Murder)	Bridges; Alonzo Lee; Shamar Daugherty; Dwight Grant; Chad Butler; Corey Miller	The Trak Starz	5:15
12.	"Slap"	Bridges; Andrew Harr; Jermaine Jackson; J. Mollings; L. Mollings	The Runners	4:40
13.	"Runaway Love" (featuring Mary J. Blige)	Bridges; Jamal Jones; Keri Hilson; Richard Walters; Douglas Davis	Polow da Don	4:40
14.	"Freedom of Preach" (featuring Bishop Eddie Lee Long)	Bridges; William Jones; Craig King; Eddie Lee Long	Mr. Jonz	7:07
Total length:				62:38

Japanese bonus tracks
No.	Title	Writer(s)	Producer(s)	Length
14.	"We Ain't Worried 'Bout U"	Bridges; Scott Storch	Storch	4:25
15.	"Sweet Revenge"	Bridges; Lee; Daugherty	The Trak Starz	4:07

Notes

- ^{^[a]} signifies a co-producer

Sample credits

- "Grew Up a Screw Up" contains samples from "Runnin' (Dying to Live) by 2Pac.
- "Ultimate Satisfaction" contains a sample from "Satisfaction" by Benny Benassi.
- "War with God" contains except from "War of the Gods" by Billy Paul.
- "Runaway" contains samples from "La Di Da Di" by Slick Rick.

== Charts ==
=== Weekly charts ===
Weekly chart performance for Release Therapy
Chart (2006)	Peak position
Australian Albums (ARIA)	93
Canadian Albums (Nielsen SoundScan)	11
Swiss Albums (Schweizer Hitparade)	57
UK Albums (Official Charts Company)	69
US Billboard 200	1
US Top Rap Albums (Billboard)	1
US Top R&B/Hip-Hop Albums (Billboard)	2

=== Year-end charts ===
2006 year-end chart performance for Release Therapy
Chart (2006)	Position
US Billboard 200	81
US Top R&B/Hip-Hop Albums (Billboard)	20

2007 year-end chart performance for Release Therapy
Chart (2007)	Position
US Billboard 200	102
US Top R&B/Hip-Hop Albums (Billboard)	41

== Certifications ==
Certifications for Release Therapy
Region	Certification	Certified units/sales
United States (RIAA)	Platinum	1,300,000

== See also ==
- List of Billboard 200 number-one albums of 2006
