= Get Back (Ludacris song) =

Single by Ludacris

from the album The Red Light District
- B-side: "Put Your Money"
- Released: November 1, 2004
- Recorded: 2004
- Genre: Original version: Hip-hop; Sum 41 Rock Remix: Rapcore
- Length: 4:30 (Album Version); 4:11 (Sum 41 Rock Remix)
- Label: DTP, Def Jam
- Songwriter: Christopher Bridges
- Producers: The Medicine Men; Tic Toc

Ludacris singles chronology
"Shake Dat Shit" (2004)	"Get Back" (2004)	"Lovers and Friends" (2004)

"Get Back" is a song by American rapper Ludacris, from his album The Red Light District. It was released as the first single from the album and reached #13 on the Billboard Hot 100 in January 2005.

== Music video ==
The music video features Dolla Boy from DTP's Playaz Circle, who makes a brief part of the song in which he and Ludacris both say, "I came I saw I hit 'em right dead in the jaw." The video also features a cameo from Fatlip, a former member of the group The Pharcyde who previously worked with the video's director Spike Jonze.

== In popular culture ==
- A remix of the song featuring rock band Sum 41 was also released as a single, featuring a much more rock and punk sound than the original song. The "Sum 41 Rock Remix" version was released as a bonus track on iTunes in the UK in both Ludacris' album The Red Light District and Sum 41's album Chuck. In addition to this, the remix was featured in the trailer for Smokin' Aces and A Haunted House 2.
- The song is also featured as the ending theme of Tropic Thunder (where Tom Cruise does a hip-hop dance to it). The song was also performed at the 2010 MTV Movie Awards at which Tom Cruise and Jennifer Lopez danced to the song.
- A different rock mix featuring Lazyeye was released on one of the "Get Back" singles in 2005. This version was heard in The Longest Yard and was performed live on The Tonight Show with Jay Leno and at the Spike TV Video Game Awards in 2004.

== Charts ==
=== Weekly charts ===
Chart (2004–2005)	Peak position
US Billboard Hot 100	13
US Hot R&B/Hip-Hop Songs (Billboard)	9
US Hot Rap Songs (Billboard)	5
US Pop Airplay (Billboard)	34
US Rhythmic Airplay (Billboard)	9

=== Year-end charts ===
Chart (2005)	Position
US Billboard Hot 100	77
US Hot R&B/Hip-Hop Songs (Billboard)	50

== Certifications ==
Region	Certification	Certified units/sales
United States (RIAA) Digital	Platinum	1,000,000^{‡}
United States (RIAA) Mastertone	Gold	500,000^{*}
^{*} Sales figures based on certification alone.^{‡} Sales+streaming figures based on certification alone.

== Release history ==
Region	Date	Format(s)	Label(s)	Ref.
United States	November 1, 2004	Rhythmic contemporary · urban contemporary radio	Disturbing tha Peace, Def Jam	
United States	November 22, 2004	Contemporary hit radio	Disturbing tha Peace, Def Jam	
