= Number One Spot =

Single by Ludacris

from the album The Red Light District
- Released: February 15, 2005
- Recorded: 2004
- Genre: Hip hop
- Length: 4:32
- Label: DTP, Def Jam
- Songwriter(s): Christopher Bridges, James D'Agostino, Quincy Jones
- Producer(s): DJ Green Lantern

Ludacris singles chronology
"Sugar (Gimme Some)" (2005)	"Number One Spot" (2005)	"Oh" (2005)

"Number One Spot" is a song by American rapper Ludacris from his fifth studio album The Red Light District. The song heavily samples Quincy Jones' composition "Soul Bossa Nova", which was later made famous as the theme tune to the Mike Myers James Bond parody film series Austin Powers; the films' references play a major part in the song and its music video.

In the song's first verse, Ludacris says: "Respected highly, hi, Mr. O'Reilly/Hope all is well, kiss the plaintiff and the wifey". This line is a response to Bill O'Reilly's criticism of Pepsi for featuring Ludacris in a TV commercial in 2002; it is a reference to a sexual harassment lawsuit brought against O'Reilly by a former employee in 2004.

"Number One Spot" reached #19 on the US Billboard Hot 100 chart and #30 in UK. The song was nominated for Best Rap Solo Performance at the Grammy Awards of 2006, but it lost to Kanye West's "Gold Digger". A remix to the song features Kardinal Offishall.

== Music video ==
The music video features spoofs of scenes from the Austin Powers films, with Ludacris taking the roles of Austin Powers, Fat Bastard, Goldmember and Dr. Evil. The video also features LisaRaye and Verne Troyer, who plays Mini-Me in the film franchise. Quincy Jones, Slick Rick, Katt Williams and DJ Green Lantern also make appearances in the music video. The subsequent single entitled "The Potion" was the conclusion to the music video (lasting approximately 45 seconds). The video won the MTV Video Music Award for Best Rap Video in 2005.

== Track listing ==
CD Single

1. "Number One Spot" (clean version) – 4:34
2. "Number One Spot" (explicit version) – 4:34

12" single

1. "Number One Spot" (explicit version) – 4:34
2. "The Potion" (explicit version) – 3:54
3. "Get Back" (explicit version) – 4:30
4. "Get Back" (Sum 41 rock remix) – 4:11

== Charts ==
=== Weekly charts ===
Chart (2005)	Peak position
UK Singles (OCC)	30
UK Hip Hop/R&B (OCC)	10
US Billboard Hot 100	19
US Billboard Pop 100	38
US Digital Song Sales (Billboard)	20
US Hot R&B/Hip-Hop Songs (Billboard)	8
US Hot Rap Songs (Billboard)	6
US Rhythmic (Billboard)	21

=== Year-end charts ===
Chart (2005)	Position
US Billboard Hot 100	99
US Hot R&B/Hip-Hop Songs (Billboard)	45

== Certifications ==
Region	Certification	Certified units/sales
United States (RIAA)	Gold	500,000^{^}
^{^} Shipments figures based on certification alone.

== Release history ==
Region	Date	Format(s)	Label	Ref.
United States	February 14, 2005	Rhythmic contemporary radio	Def Jam South, IDJMG	
United States	February 14, 2005	Urban contemporary radio	Def Jam South, IDJMG	
