= Runaway Love (Ludacris song) =

Single by Ludacris featuring Mary J. Blige

from the album Release Therapy
- B-side: "Girls Gone Wild" (UK only)
- Released: February 12, 2007
- Recorded: 2006
- Genre: Conscious hip hop; R&B
- Length: 4:41
- Label: DTP; Def Jam
- Songwriters: Christopher Bridges; Douglas Davis; Keri Hilson; Jamal Jones; Richard Walters
- Producers: Polow da Don; J. R. Rotem (add.)

Ludacris singles chronology
"Glamorous" (2007)	"Runaway Love" (2007)	"Slap" (2007)

Mary J. Blige singles chronology
"We Ride (I See the Future)" (2006)	"Runaway Love" (2007)	"Just Fine" (2007)

"Runaway Love" is the third single released from Ludacris' fifth album, Release Therapy (2006). The song, which features Mary J. Blige on the vocals, was produced by Polow da Don and reached #2 on the Billboard Hot 100 singles chart only behind Justin Timberlake's "What Goes Around... Comes Around". The song was the first single from Release Therapy in the United Kingdom and was released as a double A-side with "Girls Gone Wild" included. The song was performed at the 2007 Grammy Awards show by Ludacris, Mary J. Blige and Earth, Wind & Fire. A remix of the song is available by T-Pain featuring Cassie.

== Writing and composition ==
"Runaway Love" was written by Ludacris, Keri Hilson, Polow da Don, Doug E. Fresh, and Slick Rick, while production was handled by Polow da Don. The song contains a sample from the 1985 single "La Di Da Di" by Doug E. Fresh & Slick Rick. It was recorded by Jason Monroy at The Ludaplex and Dan Cheung at Right Track–Sound on Sound Recording – recording studios in Atlanta, Georgia and New York City respectively. During the recording of "Runaway Love", guitars and bass instruments were played by Mike Hartnett, and Jason Monroy and J. R. Rotem provided keyboards. As well as partly writing the song, Hilson provides background vocals, although she is not credited as having appeared on the song. The mix was carried out by Phil Tan at The Tanning Booth, Soapbox Studios, with additional engineering provided by Josh Houghkirk. The song was mastered by Bernie Grundman at Bernie Grundman Mastering.

== Lyrical content ==
Each of the three verses provides a fictional account of the troubles faced by a different runaway female preadolescent: nine-year-old Lisa, ten-year-old Nicole, and eleven-year-old Erika, all of whom end up running away to escape their individual problems.

A brief, commonly used sample of Slick Rick saying "Like this" appears in the beginning and at approximately 1:08 in the song. At the end of the song, Ludacris expresses that he feels like running away himself sometimes.

=== Lisa ===
The 1st account involves nine-year-old Lisa (played by Arielle Lopez), who has never met her father and has a drug-addicted mother (played by Kim Delaney) who brings home men at different hours of the night (including one played by Michael Rapaport). When the drugs render her mother unconscious, the men that her mother brought home go to Lisa's room and molest her, hitting her whenever she resists. Lisa tries to explain this to her mom, who doubts her. She then decides to run away.

=== Nicole ===
The second plot involves lonely ten-year-old Nicole (played by Raquel Castro), who believes she is not beautiful, and thinks nobody likes her, and wonders why this is so. Her alcoholic stepfather (played by Jon Seda) physically abuses her, and when her schoolteachers constantly ask her about her bruises (which her stepfather caused), she lies to them. Nicole promises her only best friend, Stacy, that they'll be close forever. However, one day, Stacy is unintentionally killed in an accidental drive-by shooting. Feeling alone again, Nicole decides to run away.

=== Erika ===
The final tale involves eleven-year-old Erika (played by Keke Palmer), who is taking drugs such as ecstasy to escape pain. She is also, with guilt, having sex with her sixteen-year-old boyfriend (played by Julito McCullum). As the relationship progresses, Erika starts to believe she is truly in love with her boyfriend, and they have sex without protection. After Erika becomes pregnant by him, he leaves her because he feels unprepared to raise a child. Additionally, her family is poor, so she cannot afford an abortion. Aware that if she tells her mom she is pregnant, her mom will be very disappointed and overreact with implied consequences too harsh for her, Erika eventually decides to run away. In the music video, it is shown that as Erika contemplates going home, she imagines her mom yelling at and physically abusing her. She is seen on a park bench crying while Mary J. Blige sings next to her.

== Music video ==
The music video for "Runaway Love" was directed by Jessy Terrero. Ludacris originally wanted Spike Lee to direct the video, but he was unavailable due to filming the motion picture Miracle at St. Anna. It premiered on the Internet on November 29, 2006, on Yahoo! Music. A day later it was released on television, on BET's 106 & Park as a New Joint. The video, which is also divided in three situations, follows a storyline faithfully based on the song. Mary J. Blige is featured in all of the three situations as a pedestrian that passes by the runaway girls. Featured in the background are orange posters for the National Runaway Switchboard, a crisis hotline serving runaway and homeless youth and their families. The hotline for the National Runaway Switchboard is also displayed on several of the "missing child" posters that are shown in the music video. This promotional effort highlights the partnership between The Ludacris Foundation and the National Runaway Switchboard to promote November as National Runaway Prevention Month and to increase awareness of issues related to runaway adolescents.

== Critical reception ==
Whilst Release Therapy was released to a largely mixed reception, "Runaway Love" drew general acclaim from music critics. In particular, many praised Ludacris and the serious subject matter addressed on the song, and the stylistic and thematic departure from his previous work. Writing for Allmusic, Marisa Brown noted that the subject of violence against women had already been addressed in previous conscious hip hop songs, calling it "a fairly normal underground hip-hop theme" but commented that it was "nice to see a new side to Luda". Nathan Rabin of The A.V. Club noted "Runaway Love"'s "bleak ghetto-griot storytelling", calling it a "departure" from the songs he recorded earlier in his career: he went on to praise Ludacris' attempts to address an unfamiliar topic, stating that "the song's grim subject matter works against his innate exuberance, but it's refreshing to see a rap superstar challenging himself". In his review of Release Therapy for Stylus Magazine, Barry Schwartz praised Ludacris for confronting the song's theme with a "solemn resignation no Ludacris song has ever approached", and noted that this was accomplished without "compromising his steez", despite noting that "serious doesn't suit him" on the other introspective material featured on Release Therapy.

== Credits and personnel ==
The credits for "Runaway Love" are adapted from the liner notes of Release Therapy.

Recording

- Recorded at: East Los Angeles in East Los Angeles, California and Right Track–Sound on Sound Recording, New York City.

Personnel

- Ludacris – vocals, songwriting
- Polow da Don – producer, songwriting
- Mary J. Blige – vocals
- Keri Hilson – background vocals, songwriting
- Mike Hartnett – guitar, bass
- Jason Perry – keyboards
- J. R. Rotem – keyboards
- Slick Rick – songwriting
- Doug E. Fresh – songwriting
- Phil Tan – mixing
- Josh Houghkirk – engineering
- Bernie Grundman – mastering

== Charts ==
=== Weekly charts ===
Chart (2007)	Peak position
Canada Hot 100 (Billboard)	73
Ireland (IRMA)	37
New Zealand (Recorded Music NZ)	21
UK Singles (OCC)	52
US Billboard Hot 100	2
US Pop Airplay (Billboard)	6
US Hot R&B/Hip-Hop Songs (Billboard)	3
US Hot Rap Songs (Billboard)	1
US Rhythmic Airplay (Billboard)	2

=== Year-end charts ===
Chart (2007)	position
US Billboard Hot 100	35
US Hot R&B/Hip-Hop Songs (Billboard)	25
US Rhythmic (Billboard)	20

== Certifications ==
Region	Certification	Certified units/sales
United States (RIAA)	Platinum	1,000,000^{‡}
^{‡} Sales+streaming figures based on certification alone.
