= The Red Light District =

Studio album by Ludacris
- Released: December 7, 2004
- Genre: Hip-hop
- Length: 65:22
- Labels: Disturbing tha Peace; Ebony Son; Def Jam South
- Producers: Craig King; DJ Green Lantern; DJ Toomp; DK All Day; Donnie Scantz; Heazy; Icedrake; LT Moe; Needlz; Organized Noize; Polow da Don; Salaam Remi; The Medicine Men; Tic Toc; Timbaland; Vudu

Ludacris chronology
Chicken-n-Beer (2003)	The Red Light District (2004)	Release Therapy (2006)

Singles from The Red Light District
- 1. "Get Back" Released: November 1, 2004; 2. "Number One Spot" Released: February 15, 2005; 3. "The Potion" Released: April 20, 2005; 4. "Pimpin' All Over the World" Released: June 14, 2005; 5. "Blueberry Yum Yum" Released: August 17, 2005

Professional ratings for The Red Light District DVD
Review scores
Source	Rating
PopMatters	5/10
RapReviews	5.5/10

The Red Light District is the fifth studio album by American rapper Ludacris. It was released on December 7, 2004, through Disturbing tha Peace/Def Jam South. The album's title refers to an urban tourist district where the standard industry is prostitution. The CD is accompanied by a 41-minute DVD made by Decon of Ludacris visiting the red-light district, a cannabis grow-room, an adult 'cam-house' and the recording of the Red Light District CD/DVD promo concert in Amsterdam, Netherlands.

Production was handled by Timbaland, Craig King, DJ Green Lantern, DJ Toomp, DK All Day, Donnie Scantz, Heazy, Icedrake, LT Moe, Needlz, Organized Noize, Polow da Don, Salaam Remi, The Medicine Men, Tic Toc and Vudu, with Chaka Zulu and Ludacris serving as executive producers. It features guest appearances from Bobby V, DJ Quik, DMX, Dolla Boy, Kimmi J., Nas, Nate Dogg, Sleepy Brown, Small World, Trick Daddy and Doug E. Fresh. A pre-famous Future co-wrote a track on the album, "Blueberry Yum Yum". The album was supported with four singles: "Get Back", "Number One Spot", "The Potion" and "Pimpin' All Over the World" and a promotional single "Blueberry Yum Yum".

In the United States, the album debuted at number-one on the Billboard 200 album chart with 322,000 copies sold in its first week. On September 29, 2005, it received a double platinum certification by the Recording Industry Association of America for selling 2 million units.

== Critical reception ==
Professional ratings
Aggregate scores
Source	Rating
Metacritic	70/100
Review scores
Source	Rating
AllMusic	3/5 stars
Cokemachineglow	68/100%
Entertainment.ie	3/5 stars
HipHopDX	3.5/5
laut.de	3/5 stars
Los Angeles Times	3/4 stars
Now	2/5 Ns
RapReviews	8/10
Rolling Stone	3.5/5 stars

The Red Light District was met with generally favourable reviews from music critics. At Metacritic, which assigns a normalized rating out of 100 to reviews from mainstream publications, the album received an average score of 70, based on sixteen reviews.

Soren Baker of Los Angeles Times wrote: "Ludacris includes thoughtful rhymes on "Child of the Night" and "Hopeless", but his humour is still his biggest asset and the reason he commands respect". Rob Sheffield of Rolling Stone named it "his most inventive album yet". Dom Sinacola of Cokemachineglow wrote: "so, Ludacris is still a distance from a definitive, unmatched hip-hop statement, but I'm content with his glaciered pace and middling "a-a-a-a-b-b-b-b-etc" frame. It's just too much damn fun to pass up". In mixed reviews, AllMusic's Andy Kellman wrote: "Luda hasn't slipped into the complacent lap of luxury as deeply as some of his fellow platinum contemporaries, but it's evident that he's not as hungry as he once was".

== Commercial performance ==
The Red Light District debuted at number-one on the US Billboard 200 album chart with 322,000 copies sold in its first week. On September 29, 2005, it received a double platinum certification by the Recording Industry Association of America (RIAA) for selling 2 million units.

== Track listing ==
Credits adapted from the album's liner notes.

No.	Title	Writer(s)	Producer(s)	Length
1.	"Intro"	Christopher Bridges; Timothy Mosley	Timbaland	1:25
2.	"Number One Spot"	Bridges; James D'Agostino; Quincy Jones	DJ Green Lantern	4:34
3.	"Get Back"	Bridges; Craig Bazile; Craig Lawson; O'Dell Vickers; Dominic Bazile	The Medicine Men; Tic Toc	4:30
4.	"Put Your Money" (featuring DMX)	Bridges; Michael Guy	Icedrake	4:13
5.	"Blueberry Yum Yum" (featuring Sleepy Brown)	Bridges; Patrick Brown; Rico Wade; Ray Murray; Nayvadius Wilburn	Organized Noize	3:55
6.	"Child of the Night" (featuring Nate Dogg)	Bridges; Nathaniel Hale; Damon McDaniels; Teena Marie Brockert	DK All Day	5:01
7.	"The Potion"	Bridges; Mosley	Timbaland	3:54
8.	"Pass Out"	Bridges; Khari Cain	Needlz	4:21
9.	"Skit"			0:55
10.	"Spur of the Moment" (featuring DJ Quik and Kimmi J.)	Bridges; David Blake; Todd Moore	LT Moe	4:15
11.	"Who Not Me" (featuring Small World and Dolla Boy)	Bridges; Sheldon Bullock; Earl Conyers; Craig King; Mark Morales; Darren Robinson; Damon Wimbley	Craig King	4:56
12.	"Large Amounts"	Bridges; Matthew McAllister; Lionel Bart	Vudu	4:33
13.	"Pimpin' All Over the World" (featuring Bobby Valentino)	Bridges; Jamal Jones; Darnley Scantlebury	Polow da Don; Donnie Scantz	5:29
14.	"Two Miles an Hour"	Bridges; Aldrin Davis; Curtis Mayfield	DJ Toomp	4:45
15.	"Hopeless" (featuring Trick Daddy)	Bridges; Maurice Young; Fred Stamand	Heazy	5:05
16.	"Virgo" (featuring Nas and Doug E. Fresh)	Bridges; Nasir Jones; Douglas Davis; Salaam Gibbs	Salaam Remi	3:31
Total length:				1:05:22

UK iTunes edition
No.	Title	Length
17.	"Get Back" (Sum 41 rock remix)	4:13

Samples credits

- "Number One Spot" samples from "Soul Bossa Nova" by Quincy Jones.
- "Get Back" contains an interpolation from “Fuck You Tonight” by Notorious B.I.G..
- "Child of the Night" samples from "Portuguese Love" by Teena Marie.
- "Who Not Me" samples an interpolation from “Stick Em” by The Fat Boys.
- "Large Amounts" samples from “Pick A Pocket Or Two” by Clive Reville.
- "Two Miles an Hour" samples from "Little Child Runnin' Wild" by Curtis Mayfield and "Summertime" by DJ Jazzy Jeff and the Fresh Prince.

== Charts ==
=== Weekly charts ===
Weekly chart performance for The Red Light District
Chart (2004–2005)	Peak position
Australian Albums (ARIA)	54
Australian Urban Albums (ARIA)	8
Canadian Albums (Nielsen SoundScan)	20
Swiss Albums (Schweizer Hitparade)	91
UK Albums (Official Charts)	98
UK R&B Albums (Official Charts)	13
US Billboard 200	1
US Top R&B/Hip-Hop Albums (Billboard)	1
US Top Rap Albums (Billboard)	1

=== Year-end charts ===
Year-end chart performance for The Red Light District
Chart (2005)	Position
US Billboard 200	22
US Top R&B/Hip-Hop Albums (Billboard)	8

== Certifications ==
Certifications for The Red Light District
Region	Certification	Certified units/sales
Canada (Music Canada)	Gold	50,000^{^}
United Kingdom (BPI)	Silver	60,000^{‡}
United States (RIAA)	2× Platinum	2,000,000^{^}
United States (RIAA) Video	Gold	50,000^{^}
^{^} Shipments figures based on certification alone.^{‡} Sales+streaming figures based on certification alone.

== See also ==
- List of Billboard 200 number-one albums of 2004
- List of Billboard number-one R&B/hip-hop albums of 2004
