= How Low =

Single by Ludacris

from the album Battle of the Sexes
- Released: December 8, 2009
- Recorded: 2009
- Genre: Hip-hop
- Length: 3:21 (album version)
- Label: DTP; Def Jam
- Songwriters: Christopher Bridges; Tyler Williams; Carlton Ridenhour; Eric Sadler; Hank Shocklee
- Producer: T-Minus

Ludacris singles chronology
| "Regret" (2009) | "How Low" (2009) | "Baby" (2010) |

Music video
- "How Low" on YouTube

"How Low" is a hip-hop song by American rapper Ludacris, released via iTunes on December 8, 2009 as the lead single from his seventh studio album Battle of the Sexes. Produced by Canadian producer T-Minus, the song debuted on the U.S. Billboard Hot 100 at #13 before peaking at #6, becoming Ludacris' best-selling single as a lead artist and being certified triple platinum by the RIAA with sales of 3,000,000 units on November 30, 2022.

== Background ==
Prior to releasing it as a single, Ludacris debuted the song live at the 2009 BET Hip Hop Awards in Atlanta, Georgia (held on October 10 and aired on October 27) as the second half of a medley that began with Lil Scrappy's "Addicted to Money", a song in which he is featured.

The track samples Public Enemy's "Bring the Noise" as the primary vocals in the chorus, with additional vocals provided by Carla Henderson. It was also nominated for Best Rap Solo Performance at the 53rd Grammy Awards in 2011, but lost to "Not Afraid" by Eminem.

== Official remixes and freestyles ==
There are two different versions of the official remix.

- The first remix, which features Rick Ross and Twista, was leaked on January 27, 2010.
- The second features Ciara and Pitbull. Ciara sings part of the hook on her remix and adds her own verse. The remix was scheduled for released to on February 9, 2010. It is included on the deluxe edition of the album. The remix was leaked on February 2, 2010.

Remixes

- Ludacris feat. Yelawolf & Rock City - How Low
- Ludacris feat. Rick Ross & Twista - How Low
- Ludacris feat. Ciara & Pitbull - How Low (Official Remix)
- Ludacris feat. Carmelo - How Low
- Ludacris feat. Lil' Rob & Pitbull - How Low (Latino Remix)
- Ludacris feat. Ciara & Chris Brown - How Low
- Ludacris feat. Chris Brown & Twista - How Low
- Ludacris feat. Pitbull, Carmelo, Twista, & Chris Brown - How Low
- The-Dream & Ciara - How Low
- Thieves Like Us - Silence (Dance Mix feat. Ludacris)
- Rock City - How Low (Freestyle)
- Chris Brown - How Low Can You Go (Freestyle)
- Twista - How Low (Freestyle)
- Benzmixer - LOW RIDDIM (ft Ludacris)

== Music video ==
The video, filmed on December 23, 2009 in Los Angeles, California and directed by Dave Meyers, leaked onto the Internet on January 20, 2010 and features a cameo from Disturbing tha Peace artist Lil Fate. It begins with three girls inside a bedroom holding a sleepover; talking directly into a camcorder, they reveal that there is a rumor that if you "go low" enough in front of a mirror, Ludacris will appear. They begin dancing to the song in front of a mirror, and Ludacris' face appears in the reflection and starts rapping. The girls, visibly excited at the sight, continue dancing. The video progresses with shots of Ludacris in a club with a black light. Back in the bedroom, Ludacris, backup dancers and masked men burst out of the mirror and into the room. The girls, frightened, run downstairs and into another room to hide, but Ludacris and his dancers come down the stairs and eventually locate the girls. He then magically tears off the girls' clothing, transforming them into erotic dancers. More people begin to appear and throw a party in the house as all of the girls dance. The video then changes over to different girls, changing in a locker room. Similarly to the original girls, the girls in the locker room also state the rumor and decide to test it by dancing low in front of the mirror, hoping to see Ludacris. Back at the original party, Ludacris raps in front of the dancing girls outside the house. However, because the girls in the locker room have started to "go low", he begins to fade, while emanating an electrostatic discharge, before then appearing in the locker room mirror.

== Charts ==
| Chart (2010) | Peak position |
|---|---|
| Australia ARIA Singles Chart | 54 |
| Belgian Tip Chart (Flanders) | 9 |
| Belgian Tip Chart (Wallonia) | 14 |
| Canadian Hot 100 | 41 |
| Dutch Tipparade (Bubbling Under) | 30 |
| New Zealand Singles Chart | 21 |
| UK Singles Chart | 67 |
| UK R&B Chart | 21 |
| US Billboard Hot 100 | 6 |
| US Pop Airplay (Billboard) | 24 |
| US Hot R&B/Hip-Hop Songs (Billboard) | 2 |
| US Hot Rap Songs (Billboard) | 2 |
| US Rhythmic Airplay (Billboard) | 4 |

=== Year-end charts ===
| Chart (2010) | Position |
|---|---|
| U.S. Billboard Hot 100 | 36 |

== Certifications ==
| Region | Certification | Certified units/sales |
|---|---|---|
| New Zealand (RMNZ) | Gold | 15,000^{‡} |
| United States (RIAA) | 3× Platinum | 3,000,000^{‡} |
^{‡} Sales+streaming figures based on certification alone.
