= Ludacris =

American rapper (born 1977)

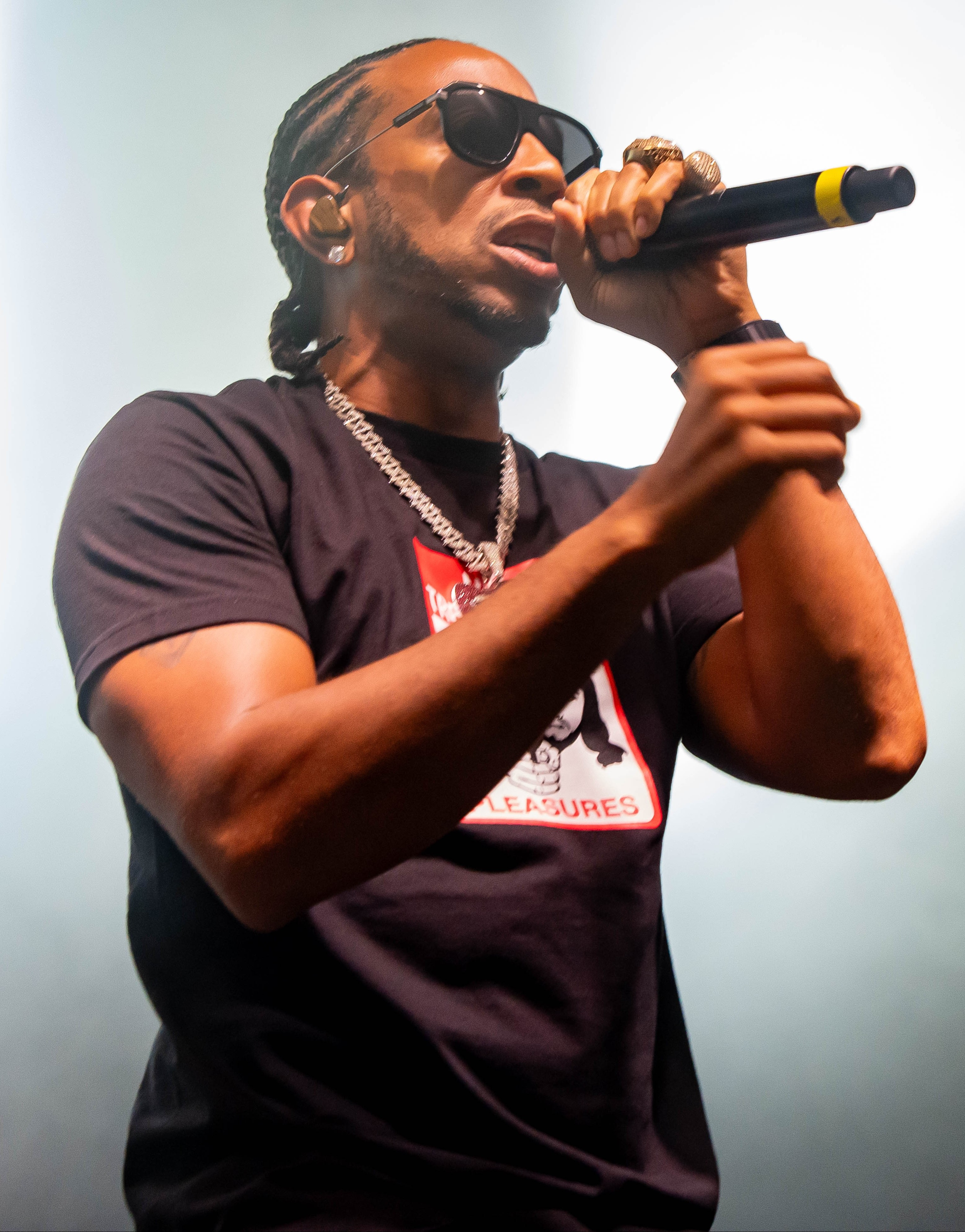
- Ludacris performing in 2024
- Born: Christopher Brian Bridges; September 11, 1977 (age 49); Champaign, Illinois, U.S.
- Other names: Chris Lova Lova; Luda; Velvet Jones; Bronze Bridges
- Occupations: Rapper; songwriter; record producer; record executive; actor
- Years active: 1998–present
- Works: Discography; filmography
- Spouse: Eudoxie Mbouguiengue (m. 2014)
- Children: 4
- Relatives: Richard Pryor (second cousin once removed); Rain Pryor (third cousin); Monica (cousin)
- Awards: Full list
- Musical career
- Origin: Atlanta, Georgia, U.S.
- Genre: Southern hip-hop
- Instrument: Vocals
- Labels: Ebony Son; Disturbing tha Peace; Def Jam; Def Jam South; Universal
- Website: theludacrisfoundation.org

Christopher Brian Bridges (born September 11, 1977), known professionally as Ludacris (/ˈluːdəkrɪs/), is an American rapper and actor. Born in Champaign, Illinois, Ludacris moved to Atlanta, Georgia, where he first began rapping. Starting out with a brief stint as a DJ, he formed the record label Disturbing tha Peace in the late 1990s to release his debut studio album Incognegro (1999). After its single, "What's Your Fantasy" (featuring Shawnna), became a top 40 hit on the Billboard Hot 100, the album was re-released by Def Jam Recordings as his major label debut, Back for the First Time (2000). The latter album peaked at number four on the Billboard 200 and spawned his second top 40 single, "Southern Hospitality" (featuring Pharrell).

Ludacris' subsequent albums—Word of Mouf (2001), Chicken-n-Beer (2003) and The Red Light District (2004)—were each met with continued success, receiving multi-platinum certifications by the Recording Industry Association of America (RIAA). His fifth and sixth albums, Release Therapy (2006) and Theater of the Mind (2008), explored more serious subject matter than their predecessors. His seventh album, Battle of the Sexes (2010), featured a return to the more lighthearted tone of his earlier albums. Throughout his career, Ludacris has scored two number-one singles on the Billboard Hot 100 as a lead artist: "Stand Up" (featuring Shawnna) and "Money Maker" (featuring Pharrell), as well as three singles which did so as a guest performer: Usher's "Yeah!" in 2004, Fergie's "Glamorous" in 2007, and Taio Cruz's "Break Your Heart" in 2009. The following year, he guest appeared on Justin Bieber's single "Baby", which remains one of the highest-certified singles of all time in the United States.

Ludacris was one of the first Dirty South rappers to achieve mainstream success in the early 2000s. He is the recipient of three Grammy Awards, a Screen Actors Guild Award, a Critics' Choice Award and an MTV Video Music Award. Outside of music, he has portrayed the character Tej Parker in the Fast & Furious film series—first appearing in its second film, 2 Fast 2 Furious (2003). His other notable acting roles include Crash (2004), Gamer (2009), and New Year's Eve (2011). In 2021, he created and starred in the children's animated series Karma's World for Netflix. Ludacris is also a private pilot.

== Early life ==
Bridges was born in Champaign, Illinois, and moved to Oak Park as a teenager. After attending Oak Park River Forest High School in ninth grade, Bridges moved to Centreville, Virginia, and attended Centreville High School for one year. He attended Banneker High School in Atlanta, Georgia, and graduated in 1995. From 1998 to 1999, he studied music management at Georgia State University. His great-great-grandfather was a Choctaw. In an interview with A. J. Jacobs, Bridges learned that his great-grandmother had said one of his great-great-grandfathers, who is a white Englishman, was probably Jewish. Bridges is also a distant cousin of the comedian Richard Pryor. He wrote his first rap song at age nine when moving to Atlanta and joined an amateur rap group three years later.

== Music career ==
=== 1998–2000: Incognegro and Back for the First Time ===
Ludacris served as an intern and a DJ at Atlanta's Hot 97.5 (now Hot 107.9) under the name "Chris Lova Lova". During his radio career, Ludacris met music producer Timbaland, whose album Tim's Bio: Life from da Bassment would feature Ludacris on the track "Phat Rabbit" (credited as Ludichris). Speaking with MTV's hip-hop show Direct Effect in 2000, Ludacris explained his stage name was a play on the word "ludicrous".

In 1999, Ludacris released his debut album Incognegro through his independent label Disturbing tha Peace. Def Jam South would later repackage Incognegro with some new songs added into Ludacris's major label debut Back for the First Time in 2000. The album reached number four on the U.S. Billboard 200 and included the singles "What's Your Fantasy" (featuring Shawnna) and "Southern Hospitality" (featuring Pharrell Williams), which respectively reached no. 21 and 23 on the Billboard Hot 100.

=== 2001–2003: Word of Mouf and Chicken-n-Beer ===
In 2001, Ludacris contributed the hit single "Area Codes" (featuring Nate Dogg) to the soundtrack to the film Rush Hour 2. It was also included on his next album, Word of Mouf, released later that year. The Word of Mouf lead single "Rollout (My Business)" was nominated for the Grammy Award for Best Male Rap Solo Performance in the 2003 Grammy Awards. Two other singles reached the Hot 100 in 2002: "Saturday (Oooh! Ooooh!)" featuring Sleepy Brown peaked at no. 22, and "Move Bitch" featuring Mystikal and I-20 peaked at no. 10.

Ludacris also had guest spots on hit singles throughout 2001 and 2002, such as Jermaine Dupri's "Welcome to Atlanta" that peaked at no. 35 on the Hot 100 and no. 15 on the Hot R&B/Hip-Hop chart. Ludacris was among multiple featured rappers on "Bia' Bia'" by Lil Jon and the East Side Boyz, which peaked at no. 47 on the R&B/Hip-Hop chart in August 2001. In the last week of 2002, "Gossip Folks" by Missy Elliott featuring Ludacris was released as a single, and it peaked at no. 8 on the Hot 100 in March 2003.

In April 2003, Ludacris released the single "Act a Fool" from the soundtrack of the movie 2 Fast 2 Furious, in which he played Tej Parker. Director John Singleton brought Ludacris into the franchise after failing to secure Ja Rule's return for the sequel to The Fast and the Furious. In the fall of 2003, Ludacris released his next album Chicken-n-Beer, featuring guest appearances from Playaz Circle, Chingy, Snoop Dogg, 8Ball & MJG, Lil' Flip, I-20, Lil Fate, and Shawnna. The single, "Stand Up" appeared on both Chicken-n-Beer as well as the soundtrack for the teen hip-hop/dance movie You Got Served. Produced by Kanye West, "Stand Up" went on to become one of Ludacris' biggest mainstream hits to date, hitting the top spot on the Billboard Hot 100 garnering heavy airplay on mainstream pop, rhythmic, and urban radio stations, as well as on MTV, MTV2, and BET. Ludacris was sued by a New Jersey group called I.O.F. who claimed that "Stand Up" used a hook from one of their songs, but in June 2006, a jury found that the song did not violate copyrights. "I hope the plaintiffs enjoyed their 15 minutes of fame," Ludacris said after the verdict.

The album's next single, "Splash Waterfalls", was released in early 2004. A huge pop hit (despite its steamy video and explicit, adult-oriented lyrical content and themes), it subsequently became a success at urban radio and BET, and is the only time he has produced two consecutive top 10 singles from a solo album, except for Release Therapy (an unedited version of the video could only be viewed on BET's Uncut program). It was Ludacris' most sexual video yet, an R&B remix that featured Raphael Saadiq and sampled Tony! Toni! Tone!'s "Whatever You Want". Ludacris received his first Grammy Award with Usher and Lil Jon for their hit single "Yeah!". Ludacris next released "Blow It Out", which was accompanied by a low-budget music video.

=== 2004–2007: The Red Light District and Release Therapy ===
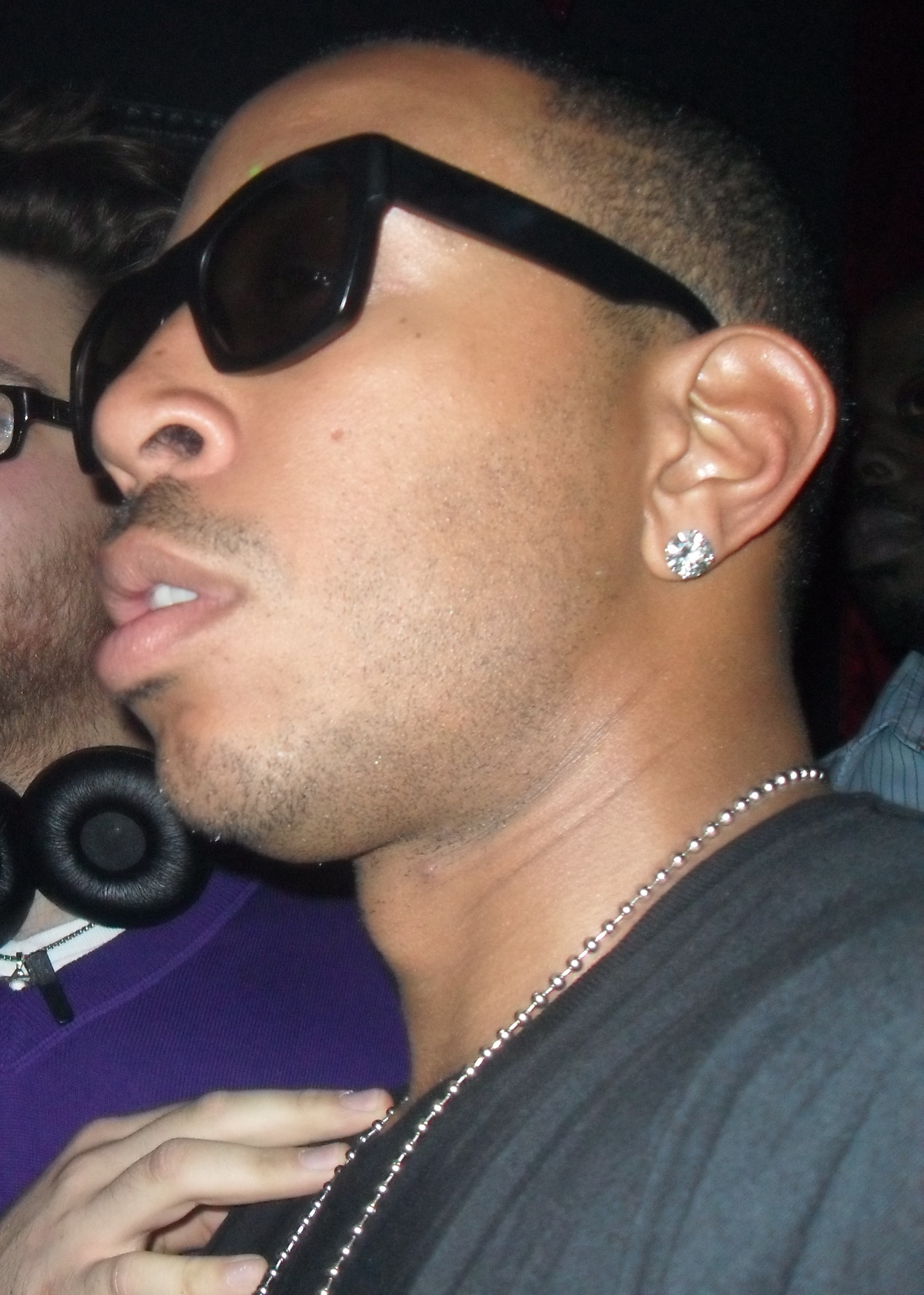
Ludacris during a 2011 New Year's Day concert in a Miami Beach nightclub

Ludacris took a more mature approach to his fourth album The Red Light District. Sohail Khalid helped produce this album with various artists such as T.I., Lil' Flip and Bun B. Ludacris openly boasted that he may be the only rapper able to keep the Def Jam label afloat on the opening track. Ludacris filmed and recorded the single "Get Back" in which he was featured as a muscle-bound hulk who was being annoyed by the media and warned critics to leave him alone. He first appeared on Saturday Night Live as a special guest performing with musical guest Sum 41 on a season 30 episode hosted by Paul Giamatti. He then recorded "Get Back" with Sum 41 to make a rock crossover single. The follow-up single was the Austin Powers-inspired "Number One Spot". It was produced by New York City's Hot 97 personality DJ Green Lantern. It used the Quincy Jones sample of "Soul Bossa Nova" and sped it up to the tempo of Ludacris' rap flow. Featured artists on the album include Nas, DJ Quik, DMX, Trick Daddy, Sleepy Brown and Disturbing tha Peace newcomers Bobby Valentino, Dolla Boi and Small World. The album debuted at number one on the Billboard charts.

In an issue of XXL, Ludacris was placed in the number nine spot for the most anticipated albums of 2006, for Release Therapy. The album Release Therapy was released on September 26, 2006. Ludacris formatted the CD to have two sides: a Release side and a Therapy side on a single CD. Guest appearances include Pharrell Williams, R. Kelly, Young Jeezy, Mary J. Blige, Field Mob, Bobby Valentino, Pimp C, C-Murder and Beanie Sigel. The first single, "Money Maker", which features Williams, was released to U.S. radio outlets on July 17, 2006. "Money Maker" reached number one on the BET program 106 & Park. It then went to become the rapper's second number-one single after 6 years. His second single, "Grew Up a Screw Up", featuring Young Jeezy, dispels rumors that the two are or ever were in a dispute. His third single, "Runaway Love", soon peaked at number one on the U.S. Billboard Hot Rap Tracks and won Best Collaboration in the 2007 BET Awards. Release Therapy won the Best Rap Album award at the 2007 Grammy Awards. His album then reached number one on the Billboard 200 album charts with sales of 309,000 in its first week. With the release of this album, Ludacris marked a change in style in his career with his musical style. The new album itself features a departure of the lighthearted mood of his previous albums, and introduces a darker side. A change of hair accompanied this as he cut off his trademark braids for a more conventional "fade" cut. To promote the album, Ludacris returned to Saturday Night Live (as both host and musical guest) on November 18, 2006.

=== 2008–2010: Theater of the Mind and Battle of the Sexes ===
The Preview, a mixtape to preview the album was released on July 28, 2008. Theater of the Mind was released on November 24, 2008, and in April 2008, the single "Let's Stay Together" appeared on xxlmag.com; supposedly from the new album ("Let's Stay Together" was expected to but was released as a bonus track on the CD). A song with Small World called "Pinky Shinin" was expected to be on the album, but it was dropped. In an interview with Complex Magazine he stated that Chris Brown, Lil Wayne, Rick Ross, T.I., Plies, Common, T-Pain, Jay-Z, Nas and The Game will be on the album; Game is featured in a track with Willy Northpole titled "Call Up the Homies". T.I. was on the album on a track called "Wish You Would" squashing the long feud between them. The album debuted at number five on the Billboard 200 with 213,493 sold first week. The album was released the same day as Kanye West's 808s & Heartbreak, which took the number-one spot. His first single "What Them Girls Like", featuring Chris Brown and Sean Garrett, peaked at number 33 on the Billboard Hot 100. His second single, "One More Drink", featuring T-Pain, peaked at number 24 on the Billboard Hot 100. The third official single is "Nasty Girl", featuring Plies. He confirmed a "sequel" titled Ludaversal due to be released September 11, 2012.

Ludacris was featured on Justin Bieber's hit single "Baby", which became one of the highest-certified singles of all time in the US and gained international success. His eighth studio album was released on March 9, 2010, with his first promotional single for the album being "Everybody Drunk" which features Callum Smith, originally featuring Shawnna. The first concept idea of the album was to have Ludacris and Shawnna battle it out on the album back–to–back, but this was later axed upon Shawnna's departure from Disturbing tha Peace, ending her contract on Ludacris' label and joining T-Pain's Nappy Boy Entertainment label. The first official single released from Battle of the Sexes was "How Low", which was released on December 8, 2009. The follow–up single was "My Chick Bad", released on February 23, 2010. The third single is "Sex Room", peaking at number 69 on the Billboard Hot 100. Ludacris's Battle of the Sexes entered the chart at number one, with 137,000 sales in the first week. The album is currently certified gold.

=== 2012–2015: Ludaversal ===
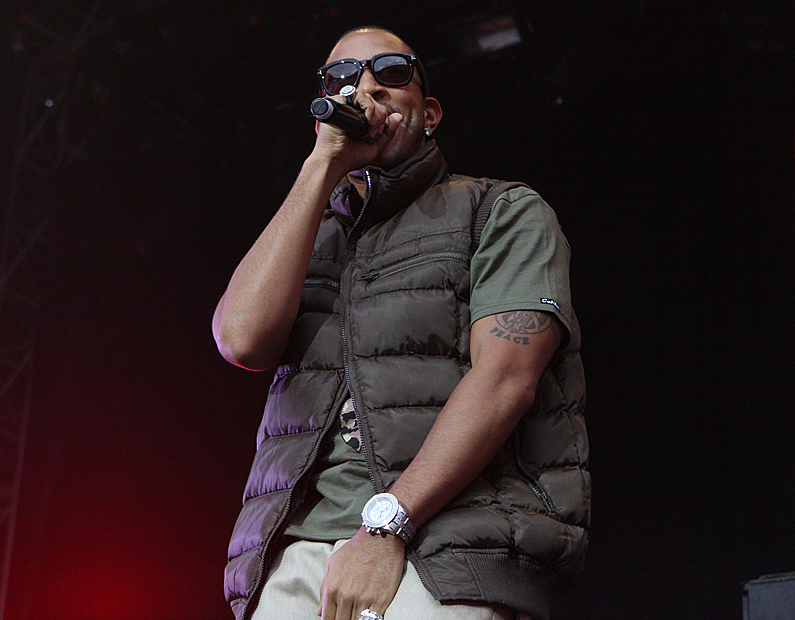
Ludacris performing in 2012 at Supafest 3

In 2012, Ludacris released the singles "Representin" and "Rest of My Life", both of which were scrapped after the songs underperformed and the recording process for his upcoming album Ludaversal stalled.

On May 24, 2013, Ludacris released a mixtape entitled #IDGAF. He had been releasing a new song on Fridays as he was calling these releases IDGAF Fridays. These songs, in order of release, were "Raised in the South" featuring rapper Jeezy, released on April 19. That release was followed by "If I Ain't Fucked Up" on April 26, "9 Times Out of 10" featuring rappers French Montana & Que on May 3, "Speak into The Mic" on May 10, and "I Don't Give A Fuck" on May 17. The last song was released a week before the release of the mixtape. The mixtape had almost 60,000 downloads via datpiff.com within the first day. Ludacris reprised his role as Tej in the blockbuster movie Fast & Furious 6, which opened during Memorial Day Weekend, May 2013. Ludacris had this to say about his upcoming new album: "I think every album is like a progression, I'm working with different producers. Usher, We definitely have this album which is a great thing. Ne-Yo is also on the album and I have producers like David Guetta, we have Stargate, have trainees. [The] Kelly Rowland single just came out that you need to check out. It's called 'Representing'".

On August 3, 2013, Ludacris confirmed to VIBE.com he will be working with Anita Baker. "I don't know if the cat's out the bag. Yeah, Anita Baker is definitely on the album", admitted Luda. "She's on that particular song. [It] is really about my father and growing up and me being a kid and trying to get him to stop and me dealing with that."

After a lengthy hiatus, Ludacris returned to the music on January 30, 2014, with the release of a single "Party Girls" featuring Jeremih, Wiz Khalifa and Cashmere Cat. The song takes a cue from Aqua's 1997 song "Barbie Girl"; however, the single did not appear on the new album. On October 9, 2014, Ludacris announced that Ludaversal would be released on March 31, 2015; which will be preceded by an EP titled Burning Bridges due for release on December 16, 2014. On October 31, 2014, Ludacris premiered the first single from the "Burning Bridges" EP titled "Good Lovin'" featuring American singer Miguel.

Due to its moderate success, "Good Lovin" would go on to serve as the first single from Ludaversal. On March 3, 2015, Ludacris held a listening party for Ludaversal with Def Jam. The tracks "Intro", "Not For Long" featuring Usher, and "Come N See Me" featuring Big K.R.I.T. were revealed to the public After 3 years worth of delays, Ludaversal was released March 31, 2015 to generally positive reviews and peaked at number 3 on the Billboard 200.

=== 2017–present: Upcoming tenth studio album and Karma's World ===
In March 2017, Ludacris confirmed that he was working on his tenth studio album in an interview with Complex magazine. On March 31, 2017, Ludacris released a new single called "Vitamin D" featuring Ty Dolla $ign.

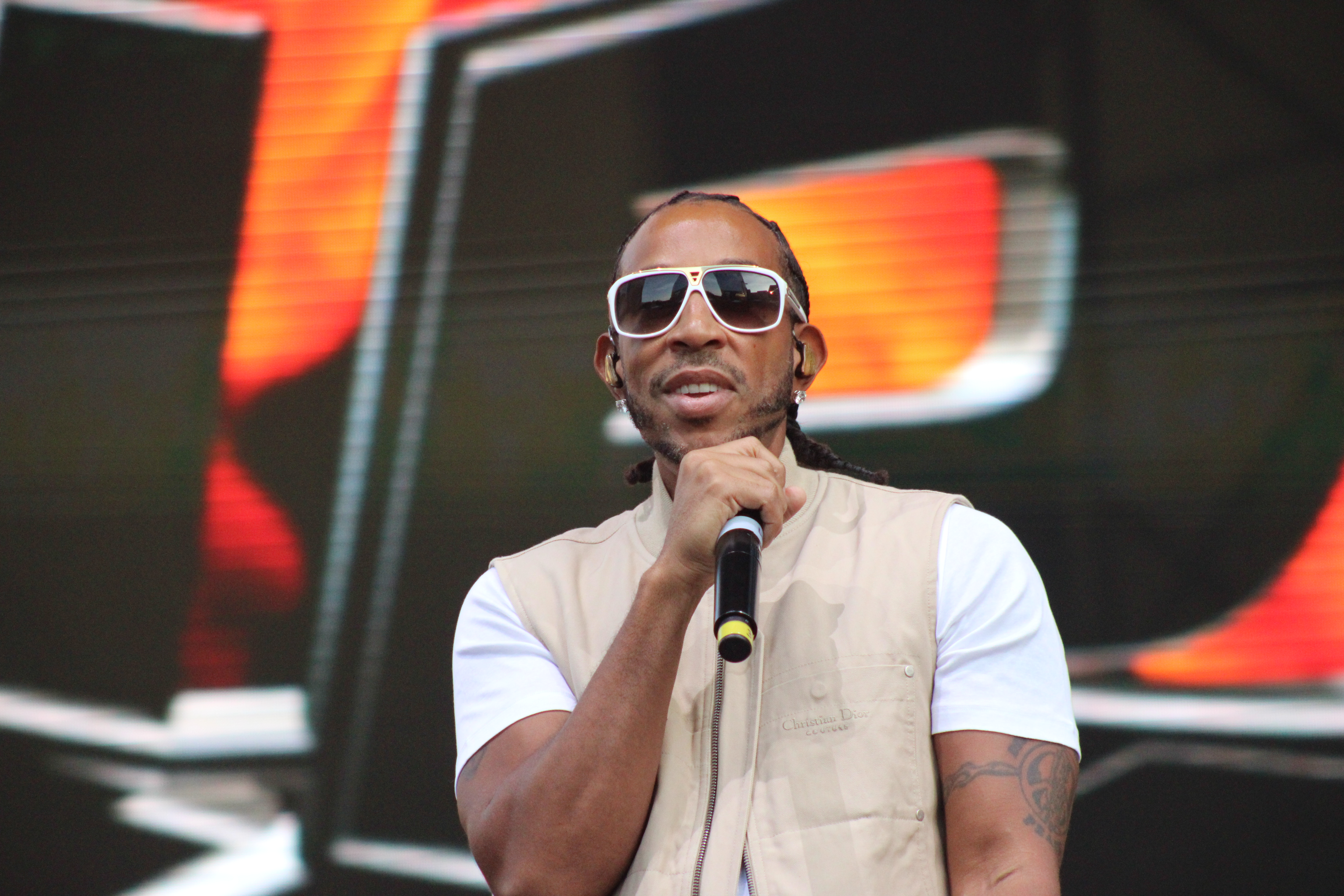
Ludacris performing in 2025 at Taste of Minnesota festival

In 2017, Ludacris hosted YouTube's Best.Cover.Ever show.

In 2018, he was featured on country singer Carrie Underwood's single "The Champion". The song peaked at number 47 on the Billboard Hot 100 and was the opening song for Super Bowl LII and 2018 Winter Olympics and Cry Pretty. On May 8, 2018, Ludacris received three nominations and one win at the 2018 CMT Music Awards.

On October 14, 2020, Netflix commissioned his then-new animated musical children's television series known as Karma's World for an initial 40 episodes from 9 Story Productions, Creative Affairs Group and his production company, Karma's World Entertainment, Using the inspiration of his eldest daughter, Karma Bridges, and the eponymous website created in 2009, Ludacris stated in interviews with People and Billboard that he and Karma "spent close to a decade and a half" working on the "perfection" of the production. The series premiered on Netflix on October 15, 2021, alongside its official soundtrack album, which was produced and released by Def Jam Recordings on global digital music streaming platforms. On January 17, 2022, the series got nominated for three NAACP Image Awards including Outstanding Children's Program and Ludacris himself got nominated for his voice-over performance as Karma's on-screen father. Netflix renewed Karma's World for a second season on back of the encouragements, which premiered on March 10, 2022.

In August 2021, Ludacris released the single "Butter.ATL". In December 2022, it was announced that Ludacris would open up for Janet Jackson's Together Again Tour. In 2024 Ludacris made a cameo in Usher's Super Bowl LVIII halftime show, performing his portion of "Yeah". In 2025 Ludacris released the single "44 Bars". In 2026, Ludacris released the single "Pull Over", which is rumored to be the first single for an upcoming album.

== Personal life ==
From 2009 until their marriage in 2014, he dated model Eudoxie Mbouguiengue. On December 26, 2014, Ludacris became engaged to Mbouguiengue while in Costa Rica, and the two married later that same day. In early June 2015, Eudoxie announced that the couple had welcomed a baby girl. In May 2021, Eudoxie shared via Instagram that she and Ludacris were expecting their second child together. He has two other daughters from previous relationships.

In January 2020, Ludacris acquired Gabonese citizenship along with his mother and his two daughters.

== Business ventures ==
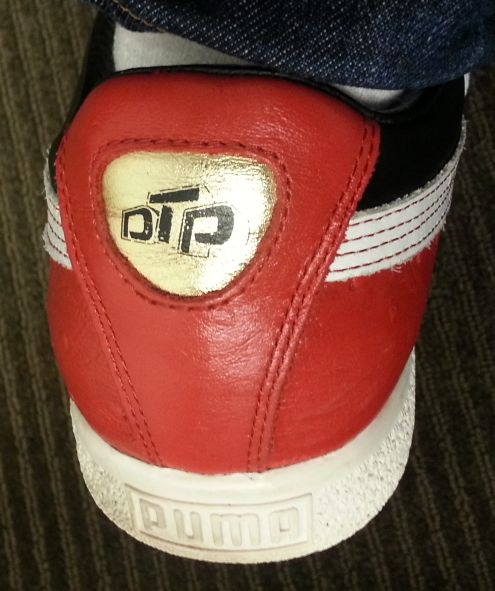
Heel window of the Clyde x Luda Puma Clyde sneaker showing the Disturbing tha Peace logo

Ludacris is the founder of his own record label, Disturbing tha Peace, an imprint distributed by Def Jam Recordings. He is the co-owner of Conjure Cognac. In 2011, Ludacris released his own line of headphones called "Soul By Ludacris" manufactured by Soul Electronics. He also has various real estate holdings.

In 2006, Ludacris appeared in a television and print advertising campaign for Puma, which released three limited edition models of a "Clyde x Luda" Puma Clyde sneaker, with Ludacris' image on the heel of the insole and "DTP" (for Disturbing tha Peace) on the heel window.

In November 2016, Ludacris opened up a restaurant named "Chicken N Beer" at the Hartsfield–Jackson International Airport in Atlanta.

In December 2023, he made his theater producing debut as a producer on the Broadway musical How to Dance in Ohio.

== Philanthropy ==
In 2011, Ludacris joined a joint effort between Do Something and Better World Books to collect books to help restock library shelves in New Orleans. He filmed a public service announcement in support of the Epic Book Drive.

Ludacris also started the Ludacris Foundation at the beginning of his music career in 2002. The aim of the foundation is to inspire the youth through education, memorable experiences and helping the youth help themselves. The focus is what Ludacris calls the "3Ls": Leadership and Education, Living Healthy Lifestyles, and LudaCares.

== Awards and honors ==
Ludacris has won many awards throughout his career, including three Grammy Awards for his music and an ensemble Screen Actors Guild Award for his performance in the 2004 movie Crash.

In October 2019, Ludacris was named the artist-in-residence at Georgia State University, where he will mentor students in the Creative Media Industries Institute.

On April 13, 2022, Georgia State University announced the Georgia Board of Regents had approved Ludacris to receive an honorary Bachelor of Science degree in Music Management. He received this honorary degree on May 4, 2022, at the commencement ceremony at Center Parc Stadium where he also delivered a speech.

== Controversies ==
=== T.I. ===
Tensions began when T.I. saw Disturbing tha Peace rapper I-20's video in which a man wearing a shirt with the words "Trap House", was being beaten. T.I. believed the man's shirt actually said "Trap Muzik", perhaps interpreting this to be a reference to his album of the same name. Later, G-Unit artist Young Buck asked these two fellow Southern rappers to appear on his new record on the track "Stomp". T.I. recorded a verse that contained a line that Young Buck considered to be an insult towards Ludacris, "Me gettin' beat down?/That's ludicrous". Young Buck spoke to Ludacris about his interpretation of the event. Ludacris then later recorded a verse that can be found on the album Straight Outta Cashville. T.I's record company wanted Ludacris to change his verse before they sanctioned it but Ludacris refused and T.I. was therefore replaced by Game on the album version.

On June 24, 2007, at the Sunset Tower Hotel in West Hollywood, California, T.I. was involved in a physical altercation. During a luncheon held by Kevin Liles of Warner Music Group (parent company of T.I.'s label, Atlantic Records), the MC got into a fight with Ludacris' manager Chaka Zulu. According to witnesses, T.I. punched Zulu in the face and choked him and a small, brief melee ensued.

T.I. was awarded honors for Best Hip-Hop Artist at the BET Awards, and took the opportunity to apologize for his scuffle with Zulu. While accepting his award, he expressed regret over the situation. "They say it's a fine line between brilliance and insanity", he said, in an apparent reference to his troublesome alter ego, T.I.P. During the broadcast, cameras showed his onetime rival Ludacris smiling in the audience.

The two rappers have resolved their disagreement and have collaborated on four songs: "Wish You Would" off Ludacris's sixth studio album Theater of the Mind, "On Top of the World" off T.I.'s sixth studio album Paper Trail, and "We in This Bitch" off DJ Drama's album Quality Street Music. The original version of the latter had Kanye West. The two have also collaborated on Big Boi's song called "In The A", released on the 2012 album Vicious Lies and Dangerous Rumors.

=== Bill O'Reilly and Pepsi ===
On August 27, 2002, political pundit Bill O'Reilly called for all Americans to boycott Pepsi products because they hired Ludacris for promotional purposes and O'Reilly objected to Ludacris's style and attitude. The next day, O'Reilly reported that Pepsi had fired Ludacris. Six months later, Russell Simmons and his hip-hop action summit threatened a boycott of all PepsiCo products on the grounds that Pepsi had subsequently hired Ozzy Osbourne for a commercial even though Osbourne is notable for use of profanity and explicit lyrics. Eventually an agreement was reached that resulted in PepsiCo donating $3 million to Ludacris's foundation and other inner city charities.

This is referred to in the 2003 songs "Hoes in My Room" as well as "Blow It Out" from Chicken n' Beer. Three years later, this would be referred to again in the song "Number One Spot". During a summer 2003 appearance on MTV's The New Tom Green Show, Ludacris and host Tom Green launched copies of Bill O'Reilly-authored books into a dumpster using a homemade catapult. In an interview with RadarOnline.com in 2010, Ludacris stated that he and O'Reilly had made amends after having a conversation at a charity event.

=== 2008 presidential election ===
The song "Politics as Usual" from Ludacris's mixtape The Preview has caused controversy due to lyrics in the song criticizing Jesse Jackson; ("Now Jesse talkin' slick and apologizin' for what? If you said it then you meant it", in reference to Jackson stating that he would "like to cut Obama's nuts off"), John McCain ("McCain don't belong in any chair unless he's paralyzed"), President George W. Bush ("Yeah I said it, 'cuz Bush is mentally handicapped / Ball up all of his speeches and throw 'em just like candy wraps / 'Cuz what you talkin' I hear nothin' even relevant / you the worst of all 43 presidents"), and Hillary Clinton ("Hillary hated on you, so that bitch is irrelevant", in reference to Hillary's campaign comments against Obama).

== Discography ==
Studio albums

- Incognegro (1999)
- Back for the First Time (2000)
- Word of Mouf (2001)
- Chicken-n-Beer (2003)
- The Red Light District (2004)
- Release Therapy (2006)
- Theater of the Mind (2008)
- Battle of the Sexes (2010)
- Ludaversal (2015)

Soundtracks

- Karma's World Official Soundtrack (2021)

== Filmography ==
=== Film ===
Year	Title	Role	Notes
2001	The Wash	Customer	
2003	2 Fast 2 Furious	Tej Parker	
2004	Crash	Anthony	
2004	Lil' Pimp	Weathers (voice)	Video
2005	Hustle & Flow	Skinny Black	
2007	The Bros.	Himself	
2007	American Hustle	Himself	Video
2007	Fred Claus	DJ Donnie	
2008	Ball Don't Lie	Julius	
2008	RocknRolla	Mickey	
2008	Max Payne	Jim Bravura	
2009	Gamer	Humanz Brother	
2011	No Strings Attached	Wallace	
2011	Fast Five	Tej Parker	
2011	Breakaway	Himself	
2011	New Year's Eve	Brendan Nolan	
2013	Fast & Furious 6	Tej Parker	
2015	Furious 7	Tej Parker	
2015	Turkey Hollow	Narrator	TV movie
2017	The Fate of the Furious	Tej Parker	
2018	The Ride	Eldridge Buultjens	
2018	Show Dogs	Max (voice)	
2020	John Henry	Hell	
2021	F9	Tej Parker	
2022	End of the Road	Reginald "Reggie" Beaumont	
2023	Fast X	Tej Parker	
2023	Dashing Through the Snow	Eddie Garrick	

=== Television ===
Year	Title	Role	Notes
2002	MTV Cribs	Himself	Episode: "Episode #4.21"
2002	Top of the Pops	Himself	Episode: "Episode #39.24"
2002	Soul Food	Himself	Episode: "Tonight at Noon"
2003	$2 Bill	Himself	Episode: "DMX, Method Man and Ludacris"
2004	Chappelle's Show	Himself	Episode: "The Love Contract & True Hollywood Stories: Rick James"
2004	It's Showtime at the Apollo	Himself	Episode: "Ciara with Petey Pablo/I-20 feat. Ludacris"
2004–08	Saturday Night Live	Himself	Recurring Guest
2005	Driven	Himself	Episode: "Kanye West"
2005	Crank Yankers	Himself (voice)	Episode: "Episode #3.13" & "#3.19"
2005	Eve	Rufus	Episode: "Stay Tuned"
2006	Making the Video	Himself	Episode: "Ludacris: Money Maker"
2006	Diary	Himself	Episode: "Ludacris"
2006	House Band	Himself	Episode: "Ludacris"
2006–07	Law & Order: Special Victims Unit	Darius Parker	Episode: "Venom" & "Screwed"
2007	So You Think You Can Dance	Himself	Episode: "Top 16 Results"
2007	The Simpsons	Himself (voice)	Episode: "You Kent Always Say What You Want"
2008	Robot Chicken	Himself (voice)	Episode: "Monstourage"
2008	Battleground Earth	Himself/Host	Main Host
2009	Played by Fame	Himself	Episode: "Luda's Outstanding Balance"
2009	Rob Dyrdek's Fantasy Factory	Himself	Recurring Guest: Season 2
2010	Sprite Step Off	Himself	Main Guest
2010	When I Was 17	Himself	Episode: "Episode #1.2"
2010	Funk Flex Full Throttle	Himself	Episode: "Episode #1.6" & "#1.8"
2010	La La's Full Court Wedding	Himself	Episode: "Last Minute Details"
2010	Lay It Down	Himself	Episode: "Ludacris"
2010	Brandy & Ray J: A Family Business	Himself	Episode: "It's a Celebration"
2013	Behind the Music	Himself	Episode: "Ludacris"
2013	Criss Angel Believe	Himself	Episode: "Blind"
2014–17	Billboard Music Awards	Himself/Co-Host	Main Co-Host
2014	Being Mary Jane	Terrence Mitchell	Episode: "Exposed"
2014	Rising Star	Himself/Expert	Main Judge
2015	Comedy Central Roast	Himself/Roaster	Episode: "Comedy Central Roast of Justin Bieber"
2015	Teen Choice Awards	Himself/Co-Host	Main Co-Host
2015	Empire	Officer McKnight	Episode: "Without a Country"
2016	Celebrity Sweat	Himself	Episode: "Celebrity Sweat with Eric the Trainer at Super Bowl"
2016	Inside the Label	Himself	Episode: "Disturbing Tha Peace"
2017	My Houzz	Himself	Episode: "Chris "Ludacris" Bridges' Surprise Home Makeover"
2017	Best Cover Ever	Himself	Episode: "Jason Derulo"
2017	Doc McStuffins	Gus (voice)	Episode: "Get-Well Gus Gets Well/Triceratops Trouble"
2017–18	Fear Factor	Himself/Host	Main Host
2018	Wild 'n Out	Himself/Team Captain	Episode: "Ludacris/Denzel Curry"
2020	30 for 30	Himself	Episode: "Vick Part 1"
2020	Gone Mental with Lior	Himself	Episode: "Ludacris"
2021	The Price Is Right	Himself	Episode: "With Ludacris"
2021	Beat Shazam	Himself/Celebrity Player	Episode: "Beat Shazam Celebrity Challenge!"
2021	Ben & Jerry's Clash of the Cones	Himself	Episode: "Ice Cream Yum Yum"
2021	Celebrity Game Face	Himself	Episode: "Rapper's Delight"
2021	Karma's World	Conrad Grant (voice)	Main Cast
2022	Luda Can't Cook	Himself	Main Cast
2023	Top Chef	Himself	Episode: "Street Food Fight"
2023	Celebrity Prank Wars	Himself	Episode: "Ludacris V. Lil Jon"

=== Video games ===
Year	Title	Role	Notes
2003	Def Jam Vendetta	Himself	Playable character
2004	Def Jam: Fight for NY	Himself	Playable character
2006	Def Jam Fight for NY: The Takeover	Himself	Playable character
2006	NBA Ballers: Phenom	Himself	
2007	Def Jam: Icon	Himself	Playable character
2015	Forza Horizon 2 Presents Fast & Furious	Tej Parker	Voice role

=== Documentary ===
Year	Title
2003	Paper Chasers
2004	The Industry
2005	Ludacris: The Red Light District
2007	The Heart of the Game
2007	Ludacris: The Southern Smoke: Unauthorized
2017	Demi Lovato: Simply Complicated

=== Theme park attractions ===
Year	Title	Role	Notes
2018	Fast & Furious: Supercharged	Tej Parker	Universal Studios Orlando

=== Theater ===
Year	Title	Role	Notes
2023	How to Dance in Ohio	producer	Belasco Theater

== See also ==
- List of artists who reached number one in the United States
- List of awards and nominations received by Ludacris
