= Ludacris discography =

Hip hop recording artist discography

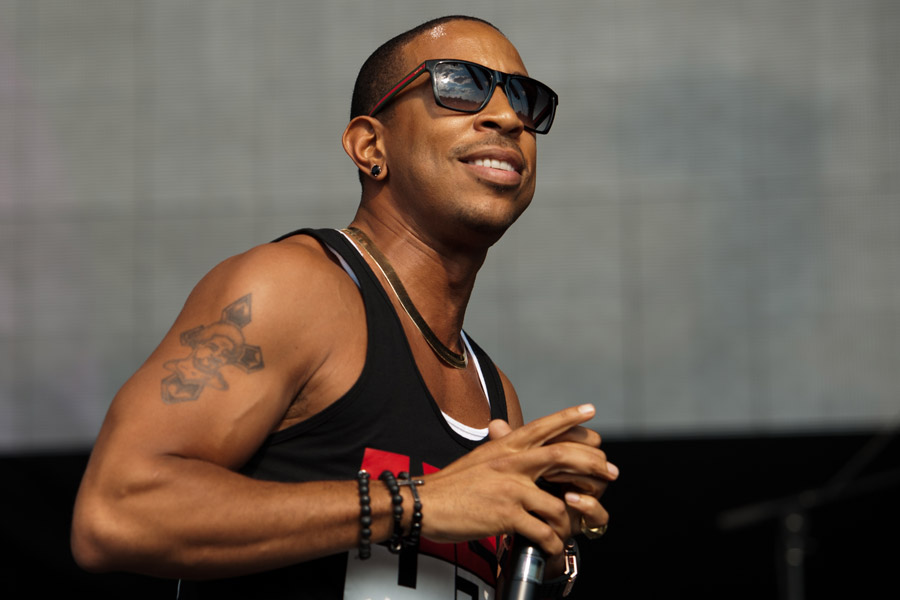
- Ludacris at Music Midtown 2012
- Studio albums: 9
- Extended plays: 1
- Compilation albums: 2
- Singles: 89
- Music videos: 88
- Mixtapes: 6
- Promotional singles: 9

The American rapper Ludacris has released nine full studio albums along with two compilation albums, one extended play (EP), six mixtapes, nine promotional singles and 89 singles—including 51 as a featured artist. From the total number of singles released by or featuring Ludacris, 35 have peaked within the top 40 of the US Billboard Hot 100 chart. Of his nine solo studio albums, four have topped the US Billboard 200 chart, while another four have peaked within the top five.

== Albums ==
=== Studio albums ===
List of albums, with selected chart positions, sales figures and certifications
Title	Album details	Peak chart positions									Sales	Certifications
Title	Album details	US	US R&B /HH	US Rap	AUS	CAN	GER	IRE	SWI	UK	Sales	Certifications
Incognegro	Released: August 17, 1999; Label: Disturbing tha Peace; Format: CD	179	68	—	—	—	—	—	—	—		
Back for the First Time	Released: October 17, 2000; Label: Disturbing tha Peace, Def Jam; Formats: CD, LP, digital download	4	2	—	—	—	—	—	—	160	US: 3,103,000	RIAA: 3× Platinum; MC: Gold
Word of Mouf	Released: November 27, 2001; Label: Disturbing tha Peace, Def Jam; Formats: CD, LP, digital download	3	1	—	—	30	98	—	—	57	US: 3,674,000	RIAA: 4× Platinum; BPI: Gold; MC: Platinum
Chicken-n-Beer	Released: October 7, 2003; Label: Disturbing tha Peace, Def Jam; Formats: CD, LP, digital download	1	1	—	98	5	87	71	—	44	US: 2,648,000	RIAA: 2× Platinum; BPI: Gold; MC: Platinum
The Red Light District	Released: December 7, 2004; Label: Disturbing tha Peace, Def Jam; Formats: CD, LP, digital download	1	1	1	54	—	—	—	91	98	US: 2,084,000	RIAA: 2× Platinum; BPI: Silver; MC: Gold
Release Therapy	Released: September 26, 2006; Label: Disturbing tha Peace, Def Jam; Formats: CD, LP, digital download	1	2	1	93	11	—	—	57	69	US: 1,300,000	RIAA: Platinum
Theater of the Mind	Released: November 24, 2008; Label: Disturbing tha Peace, Def Jam; Formats: CD, LP, digital download	5	2	1	—	22	—	—	46	137	US: 671,000	RIAA: Gold
Battle of the Sexes	Released: March 9, 2010; Label: Disturbing tha Peace, Def Jam; Formats: CD, LP, digital download	1	1	1	—	17	—	—	82	58	US: 632,000	RIAA: Platinum
Ludaversal	Released: March 31, 2015; Label: Disturbing tha Peace, Def Jam; Formats: CD, LP, digital download	3	2	2	—	20	—	—	—	86	US: 130,000	
"—" denotes a recording that did not chart or was not released in that territory.

=== Compilation albums ===
List of albums, with selected chart positions, sales figures and certifications
Title	Album details	Peak chart positions			Sales	Certifications
Title	Album details	US	US R&B	US Rap	Sales	Certifications
Golden Grain (with Disturbing tha Peace)	Released: September 10, 2002; Label: Disturbing tha Peace, Def Jam; Formats: CD, LP, digital download	6	1	—	US: 500,000	RIAA: Gold
Disturbing tha Peace (with Disturbing tha Peace)	Released: December 13, 2005; Label: Disturbing tha Peace, Def Jam; Formats: CD, LP, digital download	11	1	1	US: 630,000	RIAA: Gold
"—" denotes a recording that did not chart.

=== Mixtapes ===
List of mixtapes, with year released
Title	Album details
DTP Takeover: It's an Epidemic (with Disturbing tha Peace and DJ Storm)	Released: 2006; Label: Desert Storm South; Formats: CD, digital download
Pre-Release Therapy (with DJ Green Lantern)	Released: September 19, 2006; Label: Green Lantern; Formats: CD, digital download
The Preview (with DJ Drama)	Released: November 4, 2008; Label: DJ Drama; Formats: digital download
Conjure: A Hustler's Spirit	Released: January 20, 2010; Label: Self-released; Formats: Digital download
1.21 Gigawatts: Back to the First Time	Released: November 15, 2011; Label: Self-released; Formats: Digital download
#IDGAF	Released: May 24, 2013; Label: Self-released; Formats: CD, Digital download

== Extended plays ==
List of extended plays, with selected chart positions, sales figures and certifications
Title	Details	Peak chart positions		
Title	Details	US	US R&B /HH	US Rap
Burning Bridges	Released: December 16, 2014; Label: Disturbing tha Peace, Def Jam; Formats: Digital download	158	23	18

== Singles ==
=== As lead artist ===
List of singles as lead artist, with selected chart positions and certifications, showing year released and album name
Title	Year	Peak chart positions										Certifications	Album
Title	Year	US	US R&B /HH	US Rap	AUS	CAN	GER	IRE	NZ	SWI	UK	Certifications	Album
"What's Your Fantasy" (featuring Shawnna)	2000	21	10	5	—	—	—	—	—	—	19	RIAA: 2× Platinum; RMNZ: Gold	Back for the First Time
"Southern Hospitality"	2000	23	6	5	—	—	—	—	—	—	—		Back for the First Time
"Fatty Girl" (with LL Cool J and Keith Murray)	2001	87	32	6	—	—	—	—	—	—	—		The Good Life
"Area Codes" (featuring Nate Dogg)	2001	24	10	7	83	—	—	—	40	—	25	RIAA: Gold; RMNZ: Platinum	Word of Mouf
"Rollout (My Business)"	2001	17	7	20	84	—	—	48	—	—	20	RIAA: Platinum	Word of Mouf
"Saturday (Oooh! Ooooh!)" (featuring Sleepy Brown)	2002	22	10	4	—	—	—	—	—	—	31		Word of Mouf
"Welcome to Atlanta" (with Jermaine Dupri)	2002	35	15	3	—	—	—	—	—	—	—		Word of Mouf and Instructions
"Move Bitch" (featuring Mystikal and I-20)	2002	10	3	3	—	—	—	—	—	—	—		Word of Mouf
"Act a Fool"	2003	32	20	10	39	—	—	—	—	—	—	RIAA: Gold; RMNZ: Gold	2 Fast 2 Furious and Chicken-n-Beer
"P-Poppin" (featuring Shawnna and Lil' Fate)	2003	—	—	—	—	—	—	—	—	—	—		Chicken-n-Beer
"Stand Up" (featuring Shawnna)	2003	1	1	1	30	—	56	43	13	22	14	RIAA: Platinum	Chicken-n-Beer
"Splash Waterfalls"	2003	6	2	3	—	—	—	—	—	—	—		Chicken-n-Beer
"Diamond in the Back"	2004	94	51	—	—	—	—	—	—	—	—		Chicken-n-Beer
"Blow It Out"	2004	—	56	—	—	—	—	—	—	—	—		Chicken-n-Beer
"Get Back"	2004	13	9	5	—	—	—	—	30	48	30	RIAA: Platinum	The Red Light District
"Number One Spot"	2005	19	8	6	—	—	—	46	—	—	30	RIAA: Gold	The Red Light District
"The Potion"	2005	—	65	—	—	—	—	—	—	—	—		The Red Light District
"Pimpin' All Over the World" (featuring Bobby Valentino)	2005	9	5	2	28	—	—	—	—	—	—		The Red Light District
"Blueberry Yum Yum" (featuring Sleepy Brown)	2005	—	—	—	—	—	—	—	—	—	—	RIAA: Gold; RMNZ: Gold	The Red Light District
"Georgia" (with Field Mob featuring Jamie Foxx)	2005	39	31	21	—	—	—	—	—	—	—	RIAA: Gold	Disturbing tha Peace
"Money Maker" (featuring Pharrell)	2006	1	1	1	—	—	86	—	—	—	—	RIAA: 2× Platinum	Release Therapy
"Grew Up a Screw Up" (featuring Young Jeezy)	2006	—	60	—	—	—	—	—	—	—	—		Release Therapy
"Runaway Love" (featuring Mary J. Blige)	2007	2	3	1	—	—	—	37	21	—	52	RIAA: Platinum	Release Therapy
"Slap"	2007	—^{[A]}	56	21	—	—	—	—	—	—	—		Release Therapy
"What Them Girls Like" (featuring Chris Brown and Sean Garrett)	2008	33	17	8	98	53	—	—	—	—	—	RIAA: Gold	Theater of the Mind
"Wish You Would" (featuring T.I.)	2008	—^{[J]}	—^{[J]}	—	—	—	—	—	—	—	—		Theater of the Mind
"Undisputed" (featuring Floyd Mayweather Jr.)	2008	—^{[K]}	—	—	—	—	—	—	—	—	—		Theater of the Mind
"One More Drink" (featuring T-Pain)	2008	24	15	4	—	—	—	—	—	—	—		Theater of the Mind
"Nasty Girl" (featuring Plies)	2009	—	54	23	—	—	—	—	—	—	—		Theater of the Mind
"How Low"	2009	6	2	1	54	41	—	—	21	—	67	RIAA: 3× Platinum; RMNZ: Gold	Battle of the Sexes
"My Chick Bad" (featuring Nicki Minaj)	2010	11	2	2	—	—	—	—	—	—	—	RIAA: 3× Platinum; RMNZ: Gold	Battle of the Sexes
"Sex Room" (featuring Trey Songz)	2010	69	5	6	—	—	—	—	—	—	—		Battle of the Sexes
"Jingalin"	2012	—^{[B]}	63	—	—	—	—	—	—	—	—		Non-album singles
"Representin" (featuring Kelly Rowland)	2012	97	28	20	—	—	—	—	—	—	—		Non-album singles
"Rest of My Life" (featuring Usher and David Guetta)	2012	72	—	—	16	47	32	57	19	42	41	ARIA: Platinum; RMNZ: Gold	Fast & Furious 6
"Helluva Night"	2013	96	31	23	—	—	—	—	—	—	—		#IDGAF
"Party Girls" (featuring Wiz Khalifa, Jeremih and Cashmere Cat)	2014	113	36	20	—	—	—	—	—	—	—		Non-album single
"Good Lovin''" (featuring Miguel)	2014	91	30	21	—	—	—	—	—	—	—	RIAA: Gold; RMNZ: Gold	Burning Bridges & Ludaversal
"Vitamin D" (featuring Ty Dolla Sign)	2017	—	—	—	—	—	—	—	—	—	—		Non-album singles
"Vices"	2017	—	—	—	—	—	—	—	—	—	—		Non-album singles
"Found You" (with Chance the Rapper)	2020	—	—	—	—	—	—	—	—	—	—		Non-album singles
"Butter.Atl"	2021	—	—	—	—	—	—	—	—	—	—		Non-album singles
"Buying All Black" (featuring Flo Milli and PJ)	2022	—	—	—	—	—	—	—	—	—	—		Non-album singles
"Pull Over"	2026	—	—	—	—	—	—	—	—	—	—		
"—" denotes a recording that did not chart or was not released in that territory.

=== As featured artist ===
List of singles as featured artist, with selected chart positions and certifications, showing year released and album name
Title	Year	Peak chart positions										Certifications	Album
Title	Year	US	US R&B	US Rap	AUS	CAN	GER	IRE	NZ	SWI	UK	Certifications	Album
"One Minute Man" (Missy Elliott featuring Ludacris)	2001	15	8	—	91	—	38	47	—	92	10		Miss E... So Addictive
"Bia' Bia' (Lil Jon & The East Side Boyz featuring Ludacris, Too $hort and Chyna Whyte)	2001	94	47	—	—	—	—	—	—	—	—		Put Yo Hood Up
"B R Right" (Trina featuring Ludacris)	2002	83	50	24	—	—	—	—	—	—	—		Diamond Princess
"Why Don't We Fall in Love" (Remix) (Ameriie featuring Ludacris)	2002	—	—	—	73	—	—	—	—	—	40		All I Have
"Gossip Folks" (Missy Elliott featuring Ludacris)	2002	8	5	2	22	—	28	28	—	50	9		Under Construction
"Holidae In" (Chingy featuring Snoop Dogg and Ludacris)	2003	3	2	2	13	—	56	27	4	43	35	RIAA: Gold; ARIA: Gold; RIANZ: Gold	Jackpot
"Hot & Wet" (112 featuring Ludacris)	2003	70	29	—	—	—	—	—	—	—	—		Hot & Wet
"Yeah!" (Usher featuring Lil Jon and Ludacris)	2004	1	1	—	1	1	1	1	1	1	1	RIAA: 13× Platinum; ARIA: 9× Platinum; BPI: 3× Platinum; BVMI: Platinum; IFPI SWI: Gold; MC: Platinum; RIANZ: 6× Platinum	Confessions
"Break Bread" (I-20 featuring Ludacris and Bone Crusher)	2004	—	78	—	—	—	—	—	—	—	—		Self Explanatory
"Lovers and Friends" (Lil Jon & The East Side Boyz featuring Usher and Ludacris)	2004	3	2	1	36	—	68	22	15	44	10	RMNZ: Platinum	Crunk Juice
"Shake Dat Shit" (Shawnna featuring Ludacris)	2004	63	28	16	—	—	—	—	—	—	—		Worth tha Weight
"Oh" (Ciara featuring Ludacris)	2005	2	2	—	7	—	7	7	5	11	4	RIAA: 2× Platinum; ARIA: Gold; BPI: Silver; RMNZ: Platinum	Goodies
"Sugar (Gimme Some)" (Trick Daddy featuring Cee Lo Green, Ludacris and Lil' Kim)	2005	20	36	12	31	—	—	—	—	—	61	RIAA: Gold	Thug Matrimony: Married to the Streets
"Unpredictable" (Jamie Foxx featuring Ludacris)	2005	8	2	—	22	—	73	26	13	85	16	RIAA: Platinum; RMNZ: Gold	Unpredictable
"Need a Boss" (Shareefa featuring Ludacris)	2006	62	10	—	—	—	—	—	—	—	—		Point of No Return
"Glamorous" (Fergie featuring Ludacris)	2007	1	41	—	2	12	16	3	9	38	6	RIAA: 3× Platinum; ARIA: 3× Platinum; BPI: Platinum; BVMI: Gold; RMNZ: 3× Platinum	The Dutchess
"Get Buck in Here" (DJ Felli Fel featuring Diddy, Ludacris, Akon and Lil Jon)	2007	41	72	13	—	58	—	—	—	—	—	RIAA: Gold	Non-album single
"Rock Star" (R. Kelly featuring Ludacris and Kid Rock)	2007	—	54	—	—	—	—	—	—	—	—		Double Up
"U Can Believe It" (Playaz Circle featuring Ludacris)	2007	—	—	—	—	—	—	—	—	—	—		Supply & Demand
"Gimme Dat" (Chingy featuring Ludacris and Bobby V)	2008	—	—	—	—	—	—	—	—	—	—		Hate It or Love It
"Mr. Magnificent" (Small World featuring Ludacris)	2008	—	—	—	—	—	—	—	—	—	—		World Premiere
"Grippin'" (Sean Garrett featuring Ludacris)	2008	—	40	—	—	—	—	—	—	—	—		Turbo 919
"How We Do It (Around My Way)" (Lloyd featuring Ludacris)	2008	—	77	—	—	—	—	—	—	—	75		Lessons in Love
"Pretty Girl" (Jarvis featuring Ludacris)	2008	—	—^{[C]}	—	—	—	—	—	—	—	—		Dream Girls
"Chopped 'n' Skrewed" (T-Pain featuring Ludacris)	2008	27	3	—	—	—	—	—	14	—	—	RIAA: Gold	Thr33 Ringz
"How Do You Sleep?" (Jesse McCartney featuring Ludacris)	2009	26	—	—	75	40	—	—	—	—	—		Departure: Recharged
"Creepin' (Solo)" (Chamillionaire featuring Ludacris)	2009	—	—^{[D]}	—	—	—	—	—	—	—	—		Non-album single
"Regret" (LeToya featuring Ludacris)	2009	78	8	—	—	—	—	—	—	—	—		Lady Love
"Addicted to Money" (Lil Scrappy featuring Ludacris)	2009	—	96	—	—	—	—	—	—	—	—		The Grustle
"Bulletproof" (Raheem DeVaughn featuring Ludacris)	2009	—	46	—	—	—	—	—	—	—	—		The Love & War MasterPeace
"Baby" (Justin Bieber featuring Ludacris)	2010	5	96	—	3	3	22	7	4	25	3	RIAA: 12× Platinum; ARIA: 8× Platinum; BPI: 2× Platinum; BVMI: Gold; RMNZ: 3× Platinum	My World 2.0
"All I Do Is Win" (DJ Khaled featuring T-Pain, Ludacris, Rick Ross and Snoop Dogg)	2010	24	8	6	—	69	—	—	—	—	—	RIAA: 3× Platinum; MC: Platinum; BPI: Gold; RMNZ: Platinum	Victory
"Atlanta, GA" (Shawty Lo featuring The-Dream, Ludacris and Gucci Mane)	2010	—	—	—	—	—	—	—	—	—	—		Fright Night
"Break Your Heart" (Taio Cruz featuring Ludacris)	2010	1	—^{[E]}	—	2	1	5	2	17	1	1	RIAA: 3× Platinum; ARIA: 2× Platinum; BPI: Platinum; BVMI: Platinum; IFPI SWI: 2× Platinum; MC: 3× Platinum; RMNZ: Gold	Rokstarr
"Porn Star Dancing" (My Darkest Days featuring, Chad Kroeger, Ludacris and Zakk Wylde)	2010	90	—	—	—	—	—	—	—	—	—		My Darkest Days
"Ride" (Ciara featuring Ludacris)	2010	42	3	—	75	—	—	—	—	—	75	RIAA: Platinum	Basic Instinct
"I Like" (Jeremih featuring Ludacris)	2010	—^{[G]}	25	—	—	—	—	—	—	—	—	RIAA: Gold	All About You
"Saturday Night" (Jessica Mauboy featuring Ludacris)	2010	—	—	—	7	—	—	—	—	—	—	ARIA: 2× Platinum	Get 'Em Girls
"Tonight (I'm Lovin' You)" (Enrique Iglesias featuring Ludacris and DJ Frank E)	2010	4	—	—	2	3	12	5	2	4	5	RIAA: 3× Platinum; ARIA: 7× Platinum; BPI: Gold; BVMI: Gold; MC: 3× Platinum; RIANZ: Platinum	Euphoria
"Be with You" (David Banner and 9th Wonder featuring Ludacris and Marsha Ambrosius)	2010	—	44	—	—	—	—	—	—	—	—		Death of a Popstar
"Country Shit" (Remix) (Big K.R.I.T. featuring Ludacris and Bun B)	2011	—	50	23	—	—	—	—	—	—	—		Return of 4Eva
"Little Bad Girl" (David Guetta featuring Taio Cruz and Ludacris)	2011	70	—	—	15	14	5	8	19	7	4	ARIA: Platinum; BPI: Gold; BVMI: Gold; IFPI SWI: Gold	Nothing but the Beat
"Wet the Bed" (Chris Brown featuring Ludacris)	2011	77	6	—	—	—	—	—	—	—	—	RIAA: Platinum; RMNZ: Gold	F.A.M.E.
"Too Easy" (Tyrese featuring Ludacris)	2011	—	38	—	—	—	—	—	—	—	—		Open Invitation
"Just (The Tip)" (Plies featuring Jeremih and Ludacris)	2011	—	75	—	—	—	—	—	—	—	—		Purple Heart
"Tonight (Best You Ever Had)" (John Legend featuring Ludacris)	2012	79	12	—	—	—	—	—	—	—	—	RIAA: 2× Platinum; ARIA: Gold; RMNZ: Gold	Think Like a Man soundtrack
"We in This Bitch" (DJ Drama featuring Young Jeezy, T.I., Ludacris and Future)	2012	—	68	—	—	—	—	—	—	—	—		Quality Street Music
"Changed the Way You Kiss Me" (Remix) (Example featuring Ludacris)	2012	—	—	—	—	—	—	—	—	—	—		Playing in the Shadows
"Everyday Birthday" (Swizz Beatz featuring Chris Brown and Ludacris)	2012	—	44	—	—	—	—	—	—	—	—		Haute Living
"All Around the World" (Justin Bieber featuring Ludacris)	2013	22	—	—	34	10	53	31	15	—	30	RIAA: Platinum; ARIA: Platinum; MC: Platinum; RMNZ: Gold	Believe
"Run the Check Up" (DJ Infamous featuring Jeezy, Ludacris and Yo Gotti)	2016	—	—	—	—	—	—	—	—	—	—		Non-album single
"Grey" (LeToya Luckett featuring Ludacris)	2017	—	—	—	—	—	—	—	—	—	—		Back 2 Life
"Everything" (Tank featuring Trey Songz and Ludacris)	2017	—	—	—	—	—	—	—	—	—	—		Savage
"The Champion" (Carrie Underwood featuring Ludacris)	2018	47	—	—	—	—	—	—	—	—	—	RIAA: Platinum	Cry Pretty
"Quiero Saber" (Pitbull and Prince Royce featuring Ludacris)	2018	—	—	—	—	—	—	—	—	—	—		Non-album singles
"SexBeat" (Usher featuring Lil Jon and Ludacris)	2020	—	—	—	—	—	—	—	—	—	—		Non-album singles
"Tell Me Again" (Pitbull featuring Prince Royce and Ludacris)	2020	—	—	—	—	—	—	—	—	—	—		Libertad 548
"Peaches" (Remix) (Justin Bieber featuring Ludacris, Usher and Snoop Dogg)	2021	—	—	—	—	—	—	—	—	—	—		Non-album single
"Kingpin (Knock Ya Head Off)" (Busta Rhymes and J Dilla featuring Anderson .Paak and Ludacris)	2026	—	—	—	—	—	—	—	—	—	—		Dillagence 2
"—" denotes a recording that did not chart or was not released in that territory.

=== Promotional singles ===
List of promotional singles, with selected chart positions, showing year released and album name
Title	Year	Peak chart positions			Album
Title	Year	US	US R&B	NZ	Album
"I'm So Hood" (Remix) (DJ Khaled featuring Young Jeezy, Ludacris, Busta Rhymes, Big Boi, Lil Wayne, Fat Joe, Birdman and Rick Ross)	2007	—	—	—	We the Best
"Down in tha Dirty" (featuring Bun B and Rick Ross)	2007	—	—^{[H]}	—	Strength in Numbers
"Still Standing" (Monica featuring Ludacris)	2008	—^{[I]}	74	—	Still Standing
"Hey Ho" (featuring Lil' Kim and Lil' Fate)	2010	—^{[L]}	—	—	Battle of the Sexes
"Beamer, Benz or Bentley" (Remix) (Lloyd Banks featuring The-Dream, Ludacris, Jadakiss and Yo Gotti)	2010	—	—	—	Non-album single
"Shake Señora" (Remix) (Pitbull featuring T-Pain, Sean Paul and Ludacris)	2011	—	—	40	Planet Pit
"Dirt Road Anthem" (Remix) (Jason Aldean featuring Ludacris)	2011	7	—	—	Non-album single
"Shera Di Kaum" (RDB featuring Ludacris)	2011	—	—	—	Breakaway
"Welcome to My Hood" (Remix) (DJ Khaled featuring Ludacris, T-Pain, Busta Rhymes, Mavado, Twista, Birdman, Ace Hood, Fat Joe, Jadakiss, Bun B, Game and Waka Flocka Flame)	2011	—	—	—	We the Best Forever
"Same Damn Time" (Remix) (Future featuring Diddy and Ludacris)	2012	—	—	—	Pluto 3D
"22 Jump Street" (Angel Haze featuring Ludacris)	2014	—	—	—	22 Jump Street
"Call Ya Bluff"	2015	—	—^{[X]}	—	Ludaversal
"Beast Mode"	2015	—	—	—	Ludaversal
"—" denotes a recording that did not chart or was not released in that territory.

== Other charted and certified songs ==
List of songs, with selected chart positions, showing year released and album name
Title	Year	Peak chart positions		Certifications	Album
Title	Year	US	US R&B	Certifications	Album
"Ho"	1999	—	—^{[M]}		Incognegro
"Growing Pains" (featuring Fate Wilson and Keon Bryce)	2001	—	—	RMNZ: Gold	Word of Mouf
"Pick Up the Phone" (with Tyrese and R. Kelly)	2003	—	65		2 Fast 2 Furious soundtrack
"Stomp" (Young Buck featuring Ludacris and T.I.)	2004	—	—^{[N]}		Straight Outta Cashville
"In da Club" (Lil Jon & The East Side Boyz featuring R. Kelly and Ludacris)	2004	—	—^{[O]}		Crunk Juice
"Virgo" (with Nas, featuring Doug E. Fresh)	2004	—	69		The Red Light District and Street's Disciple
"Ludacrismas"	2007	—	—^{[P]}		Fred Claus soundtrack
"Dat Girl Right There" (Usher featuring Ludacris)	2007	—	74		Non-album single
"Grown Woman" (Mary J. Blige featuring Ludacris)	2007	—	—^{[Q]}		Growing Pains
"I Do It for Hip Hop" (featuring Nas and Jay-Z)	2008	—	89		Theater of the Mind
"Last of a Dying Breed" (featuring Lil Wayne)	2008	65	—		Theater of the Mind
"Born an OG" (Ace Hood featuring Ludacris)	2009	—^{[R]}	—		Ruthless
"Everybody Drunk" (featuring Lil Scrappy)	2010	—^{[S]}	—		Battle of the Sexes
"Atlanta Zoo" (Gucci Mane featuring Ludacris)	2010	—	—^{[T]}		Burrrprint (2) HD
"She Don't Know" (Usher featuring Ludacris)	2010	—	—^{[U]}		Raymond v. Raymond
"Tongues" (R. Kelly featuring Ludacris)	2010	—	—^{[V]}		Non-album single
"Rich & Flexin'" (featuring Waka Flocka Flame)	2011	—	—^{[W]}		1.21 Gigawatts: Back to the First Time
"—" denotes a recording that did not chart.

== Guest appearances ==
List of guest appearances, with other performing artists, showing year released and album name
Title	Year	Other artist(s)	Album
"Catch Up"	1999	James Prince, Infamous 2-0, Lil' Fate	J Prince Presents R.N.D.S.
"Block Lockdown"	2000	Funkmaster Flex, I-20	The Mix Tape, Vol. IV
"That's How I Get Down"	2001	Ginuwine	The Life
"Cut Somethin'"	2001	Jagged Edge	Jagged Little Thrill
"Get the Hell on with That"	2001	Fat Joe, Armageddon	Jealous Ones Still Envy (J.O.S.E.)
"Considerate Brotha"	2001	Timbaland & Magoo, Playa	Indecent Proposal
"Real Pimp"	2001	Nate Dogg	Music and Me
"Some South Shit'"	2001	Fiend, Yung Wun	Ryde or Die Vol. 3: In the "R" We Trust
"You Got What I Want"	2002	Snoop Dogg, Charlie Wilson, Goldie Loc	Paid tha Cost to Be da Boss
"It Wasn't Us"	2003	I-20	The Neptunes Present... Clones
"Tomb of the Boom"	2003	OutKast, Konkrete, Big Gipp	Speakerboxxx/The Love Below
"Down South"	2003	Big Tymers, Lil Wayne, Jazze Pha	Big Money Heavyweight
"Higher"	2004	Twista	Kamikaze
"The Whole City Behind Us"	2004	The Game, Kanye West	Westside Story: the Compton Chronicles
"Breathe In Breathe Out"	2004	Kanye West	The College Dropout
"Childz Play"	2004	Cee Lo Green	Cee-Lo Green... Is the Soul Machine
"Shot Off"	2004	8Ball & MJG	Living Legends
"Rodeo"	2004	Method Man	Tical 0: The Prequel
"I Came to Bring the Pain"	2004	Lil' Flip, Static Major, Tity Boi	U Gotta Feel Me
"Stomp"	2004	Young Buck, The Game	Straight Outta Cashville
"Give Me a Chance"	2005	Bobby V	Bobby Valentino
"Trill Recognize Trill"	2005	Bun B	Trill
"Pacific Coast" (Remix)	2005	DJ Quik, Kimmi J.	Trauma
"Living the Life"	2005	The Notorious B.I.G., Faith Evans, Cheri Dennis, Bobby V, Snoop Dogg	Duets: The Final Chapter
"Pop U"	2006	Juvenile, Fat Joe	Reality Check
"Smilin'"	2006	Field Mob	Light Poles and Pine Trees
"Gettin' Some" (Remix)	2006	Shawnna, Lil Wayne, Pharrell, Too $hort	Block Music
"Take It Slow"	2006	Shawnna, Bobby V	Block Music
"Playa Cardz Right" (Male)	2006	2Pac, Keon Bryce	Pac's Life
"Do It Well" (Remix)	2007	Jennifer Lopez	Brave
"Rearview (Ridin')"	2007	Bobby Valentino	Special Occasion
"Grown Woman"	2007	Mary J. Blige	Growing Pains
"Ya Heard"	2008	Game	LAX
"Pocketbook"	2008	Jennifer Hudson	Jennifer Hudson
"On Top of the World"	2008	T.I., B.o.B	Paper Trail
"Pop Champagne" (Remix)	2008	Ron Browz, Lil Kim, Swizz Beatz	—N/a
"High Price"	2009	Ciara	Fantasy Ride
"Born an OG"	2009	Ace Hood	Ruthless
"Creepin' (Solo)"	2009	Chamillionaire	Venom Unreleased
"We Must Be Heard"	2009	DJ Drama, Willie the Kid, Busta Rhymes	Gangsta Grillz: The Album (Vol. 2)
"Spanish Fly"	2009	Aventura, Wyclef Jean	The Last
"Coochie"	2009	The Black Keys, Ol' Dirty Bastard	BlakRoc
"She Don't Know"	2010	Usher	Raymond v. Raymond
"Atlanta Zoo"	2010	Gucci Mane	Burrrprint (2) HD
"Black Man's Dream"	2010	Rick Ross	Ashes to Ashes
"Beamer, Benz or Bentley" (Remix)	2010	Lloyd Banks, The-Dream, Jadakiss, Yo Gotti	—N/a
"Porn Star Dancing" (Remix)	2010	My Darkest Days, Chad Kroeger	My Darkest Days
"Soul Bossa Nostra"	2010	Quincy Jones, Naturally 7, Rudy Currence	Q: Soul Bossa Nostra
"Addicted to Money"	2010	Lil Scrappy	The Grustle
"Why You Up in Here"	2010	Flo Rida, Git Fresh, Gucci Mane	Only One Flo (Part 1)
"Yep Dat's Me"	2010	Jamie Foxx, Soulja Boy	Best Night of My Life
"Knockin'"	2011	Travis Barker, Snoop Dogg, E-40, Dev	Give the Drummer Some
"Furiously Dangerous"	2011	Slaughterhouse, Claret Jai	Fast Five
"Shake Senora" (Remix)	2011	Pitbull, T-Pain, Sean Paul	Planet Pit
"Money"	2011	DJ Khaled, Young Jeezy	We the Best Forever
"Welcome to My Hood" (Remix)	2011	DJ Khaled, T-Pain, Busta Rhymes, Twista, Mavado, Birdman, Ace Hood, Fat Joe, Jadakiss, Bun B, Game, Waka Flocka Flame	We the Best Forever
"Country Shit" (Remix)	2011	Big K.R.I.T., Bun B	Return of 4eva
"What U Mean"	2012	Big K.R.I.T.	Live from the Underground
"Candy Paint & Gold Teeth"	2012	Waka Flocka Flame, Bun B	Triple F Life: Friends, Fans and Family
"Little Boy"	2012	I-20, Twista	Endless Pursuit
"My Swag"	2012	I-20	Endless Pursuit
"Hungry in the Streets"	2012	I-20, 2 Chainz, Dolla Boy	Endless Pursuit
"Ridin' Around"	2012	I-20	Endless Pursuit
"In the A"	2012	Big Boi, T.I.	Vicious Lies and Dangerous Rumors
"Ceelo"	2013	DJ Scream, Wale, Future	The Ratchet Superior
"Disappointed"	2013	Los, Diddy	Becoming King
"Rep The Dirty"	2013	Slim Thug, Dre Day, Kez	Welcome to Texas EP
"Hands in the Air"	2013	Miley Cyrus	Bangerz
"Fantasy"	2013	Chris Brown	X Files
"Sleep"	2014	E-40, Plies	Sharp On All 4 Corners: Corner 2
"Errybody" (Remix)	2014	Yo Gotti, Lil Wayne	—N/a
"Turn Down For What" (Remix)	2014	Lil Jon, DJ Snake, Pitbull	—N/a
"Shake Em Off"	2015	Big K.R.I.T., K Camp	It's Better This Way
"Tell Me Again"	2019	Pitbull, Prince Royce	Libertad 548
"Scatter Brain"	2021	Conway the Machine, J.I.D	La Maquina

== Production discography ==
List of producer and songwriting credits (excluding guest appearances, interpolations, and samples)
Track(s)	Year	Credit	Artist(s)	Album
5. "Come On Over"	2001	Producer	Ludacris	Back for the First Time
6. "Hood Stuck"	2001	Producer	Ludacris	Back for the First Time
8. "Mouthing Off"	2001	Producer	Ludacris	Back for the First Time
13. "Catch Up"	2001	Producer	Ludacris	Back for the First Time
3. "Stand Up"	2003	Producer (with Kanye West)	Ludacris	Chicken-n-Beer
—N/a	2004	Executive producer	I-20	Self Explanatory
2. "Party Starter"	2005	Songwriter	Will Smith	Lost and Found
4. "Fly Like Me"	2007	Songwriter	Chingy	Hate It or Love It

== Explanatory notes ==
- A "Slap" did not enter the Billboard Hot 100, but peaked at number 13 on the Bubbling Under Hot 100 Singles chart.
- B "Jingalin" did not enter the Billboard Hot 100, but peaked at number 25 on the Bubbling Under Hot 100 Singles chart.
- C "Pretty Girl" did not enter the Hot R&B/Hip-Hop Songs chart, but peaked at number 3 on the Bubbling Under R&B/Hip-Hop Singles chart.
- D "Creepin' (Solo)" did not enter the Hot R&B/Hip-Hop Songs chart, but peaked at number 1 on the Bubbling Under R&B/Hip-Hop Singles chart.
- E "Break Your Heart" did not enter the Hot R&B/Hip-Hop Songs chart, but peaked at number 21 on the Bubbling Under R&B/Hip-Hop Singles chart.
- F "I Like" did not enter the Billboard Hot 100, but peaked at number 16 on the Bubbling Under Hot 100 Singles chart.
- G "Down in tha Dirty" did not enter the Hot R&B/Hip-Hop Songs chart, but peaked at number 10 on the Bubbling Under R&B/Hip-Hop Singles chart.
- H "Still Standing" did not enter the Billboard Hot 100, but peaked at number 1 on the Bubbling Under Hot 100 Singles chart.
- I "Wish You Would" did not enter the Billboard Hot 100, but peaked at number 14 on the Bubbling Under Hot 100 Singles chart. It did not enter the Hot R&B/Hip-Hop Songs chart, but peaked at number 18 on the Bubbling Under R&B/Hip-Hop Singles chart.
- J "Undisputed" did not enter the Billboard Hot 100, but peaked at number 12 on the Bubbling Under Hot 100 Singles chart.
- L "Hey Ho" did not enter the Billboard Hot 100, but peaked at number 8 on the Bubbling Under Hot 100 Singles chart.
- M "Ho" did not enter the Hot R&B/Hip-Hop Songs chart, but peaked at number 3 on the Bubbling Under R&B/Hip-Hop Singles chart.
- N "Stomp" did not enter the Hot R&B/Hip-Hop Songs chart, but peaked at number 10 on the Bubbling Under R&B/Hip-Hop Singles chart.
- O "In da Club" did not enter the Hot R&B/Hip-Hop Songs chart, but peaked at number 7 on the Bubbling Under R&B/Hip-Hop Singles chart.
- P "Ludacrismas" did not enter the Hot R&B/Hip-Hop Songs chart, but peaked at number 4 on the Bubbling Under R&B/Hip-Hop Singles chart.
- Q "Grown Woman" did not enter the Hot R&B/Hip-Hop Songs chart, but peaked at number 19 on the Bubbling Under R&B/Hip-Hop Singles chart.
- R "Born an OG" did not enter the Billboard Hot 100, but peaked at number 17 on the Bubbling Under Hot 100 Singles chart.
- S "Everybody Drunk" did not enter the Billboard Hot 100, but peaked at number 12 on the Bubbling Under Hot 100 Singles chart.
- T "Atlanta Zoo" did not enter the Hot R&B/Hip-Hop Songs chart, but peaked at number 15 on the Bubbling Under R&B/Hip-Hop Singles chart.
- U "She Don't Know" did not enter the Hot R&B/Hip-Hop Songs chart, but peaked at number 7 on the Bubbling Under R&B/Hip-Hop Singles chart.
- V "Tongues" did not enter the Hot R&B/Hip-Hop Songs chart, but peaked at number 11 on the Bubbling Under R&B/Hip-Hop Singles chart.
- W "Rich & Flexin'" did not enter the Hot R&B/Hip-Hop Songs chart, but peaked at number 22 on the Bubbling Under R&B/Hip-Hop Singles chart.
- X "Call Ya Bluff'" did not enter the Billboard Hot R&B/Hip-Hop Songs, but peaked at number 1 on the Bubbling Under R&B/Hip-Hop Singles chart.
