= Melina Matsoukas =

American Director

- Born: January 14, 1981 (age 45); New York City, U.S.
- Education: New York University
- Occupation: Director
- Years active: 2006–present

Melina Matsoukas (born January 14, 1981) is an American music video, film, commercial and television director. She is a two-time Grammy Award winner and four-time MTV Video Music Awards winner for her "We Found Love" and "Formation" music videos. She was honored with the Franklin J. Schaffner Alumni Medal by the American Film Institute in 2019. Her directorial debut in film was Queen & Slim, starring Jodie Turner-Smith and Daniel Kaluuya, and written by Lena Waithe. She then worked as executive producer and director for television series Insecure, being nominated for the Primetime Emmy Award for Outstanding Comedy Series in 2020.

== Early life and education ==
Matsoukas was born in New York City and grew up in the Co-op City housing development in the Bronx. Her father worked as a builder, and her mother taught math in a local high school. When Matsoukas was eight, the family moved to Hackensack, New Jersey, where she attended Hackensack High School. Her father is of mixed Greek and Jewish descent, and her mother is of Afro-Cuban and Afro-Jamaican descent.

Matsoukas earned her degree at New York University's Tisch School of the Arts and completed her graduate work at the AFI Conservatory with an MFA in cinematography. Her graduate thesis was on music videos.

== Career ==
Matsoukas started out at Black Dog Film, then the now-defunct Gorilla Flix film production company, and is currently a director at Prettybird, which she has been signed to since 2011.

Matsoukas' first film was about how women are viewed in the New York meatpacking industry, though she immediately destroyed it upon completion, describing it as "a really bad film" that "made her fall in love with the medium". In 2006, Matsoukas directed her first music video upon completing grad school in 2006 for Red Handed's "Dem Girls " featuring Scooby and Paul Wall. She would later direct videos for artists such as Jennifer Lopez, Ludacris, Lady Gaga, Katy Perry, Rihanna, Solange, and eventually her most frequent collaborator, Beyonce. In 2016, Matsoukas contributed to Beyonce's visual album Lemonade with a music video for the album's lead single "Formation ". "Formation" went on to be critically acclaimed, winning Matsoukas numerous accolades such as a Grand Prix for Excellence in Music Video at the 2016 Cannes Lion Awards as well as the MTV Video Music Award for Video of the Year.

In her music video filmography, Matsoukas would utilize many of the tropes seen in other music videos at the time, but would find ways to "always articulates her aesthetic: brightly saturated color, vivid imagery, the artist at the center of the frame always establishing a video's center of gravity". Her work is described as "chock full of bright colors or crisp black and white images, smooth spotlights, and tasteful retro video models." Matsoukas says that expensive equipment is not necessary for a quality video and one should never think that way: "A good video has the right visuals, a well conceptualised story and should be exciting and elicit reaction." In an interview for Venus Zine's Fall 2010 issue, she explains about being part of the music video world, "I love it. The quick turnaround, the creativity."

Between 2016 and 2017, Matsoukas became the executive producer and director of several episodes of the critically and publicly acclaimed television series Master of None and Insecure including the acclaimed episode from Master of None "Thanksgiving", which would go on to win several Emmy Awards, though Matsoukas herself would not be nominated for any awards for her work on the program. She was later nominated for Outstanding Comedy Series at the 72nd Primetime Emmy Awards. Matsoukas also was nominated for two NAACP Image Awards for Outstanding Directing in a Comedy Series and the Directors Guild of America Awards for Outstanding Directorial Achievement in Comedy Series.

Matsoukas made her directorial debut in film with Queen & Slim, starring Jodie Turner-Smith and Daniel Kaluuya, and written by Lena Waithe. It was released on November 27, 2019, by Universal Pictures. Though Matsoukas avoids making professional decisions based on personal relationships, she was intrigued by the opportunity to direct the script written by her past collaborator and good friend, Lena Waithe, later stating that she "was looking for something [she] felt was political in a way that had something to say, that was strong and unique and powerful." Queen & Slim was well received critically and financially, and grossed $47.9 million worldwide. Matsoukas won a Black Reel Awards, a BET Award, a National Board of Review Awards and was nominated for the Directors Guild of America Awards for Outstanding Directing - First Time Feature Film.

In 2019, Matsoukas was honored with the 29th Franklin J. Schaffner Alumni Medal by the American Film Institute, and was named to the Ebony Power 100 List in 2020. In 2020 she directed the commercial spot Beats by Dre: You Love Me, being recognized with the Directors Guild of America Awards for Outstanding Directorial Achievement in Commercials.

== Personal life ==
Matsoukas is in a relationship with American music producer William Hazel. The couple had a child in 2024.

== Filmography (director) ==
=== Music videos ===
Year	Title	Artist	Notes
2006	"Dem Girls"	Red Handed feat. Paul Wall & Scooby	
2006	"Go 'Head"	Ali & Gipp feat. Chocolate Tai	
2006	"Need a Boss"	Shareefa feat. Ludacris	
2006	"Cry No More"	Shareefa	
2006	"Hey Hey"	216	
2006	"Money Maker"	Ludacris feat. Pharrell	
2006	"Dangerous"	Ying Yang Twins feat. Wyclef Jean	
2006	"Help"	Lloyd Banks feat. Keri Hilson	
2007	"Because of You"	Ne-Yo	
2007	"Green Light"	Beyoncé	
2007	"Kitty Kat"	Beyoncé	co-directed by Beyoncé
2007	"Suga Mama"	Beyoncé	co-directed by Beyoncé
2007	"Upgrade U"	Beyoncé feat. Jay-Z	co-directed by Beyoncé
2007	"Tambourine"	Eve feat. Swizz Beatz	
2007	"Do You"	Ne-Yo	
2007	"Give It to You"	Eve feat. Sean Paul	
2007	"Bleeding Love"	Leona Lewis	UK version
2007	"Hold It Don't Drop It"	Jennifer Lopez	
2007	"Sensual Seduction"	Snoop Dogg	
2007	"How Do I Breathe"	Mario	
2008	"In My Arms"	Kylie Minogue	
2008	"Wow"	Kylie Minogue	
2008	"Modern World"	Anouk	
2008	"Closer"	Ne-Yo	
2008	"I Decided"	Solange	
2008	"Just Dance"	Lady Gaga feat. Colby O'Donis	
2008	"Energy"	Keri Hilson	
2008	"Beautiful, Dirty, Rich"	Lady Gaga	
2008	"Go Girl"	Ciara	
2008	"Return the Favor"	Keri Hilson feat. Timbaland	
2008	"Diva"	Beyoncé	
2008	"Thinking of You"	Katy Perry	
2009	"I Will Be"	Leona Lewis	
2009	"So Good"	Electrik Red	
2009	"Not Fair"	Lily Allen	
2009	"Sweet Dreams"	Beyoncé	I Am... World Tour interlude video
2009	"Touch My Hand"	David Archuleta	
2009	"Work"	Ciara feat. Missy Elliott	
2009	"I Look to You"	Whitney Houston	
2009	"Million Dollar Bill"	Whitney Houston	
2009	"Sex Therapy"	Robin Thicke	
2009	"Never Knew I Needed"	Ne-Yo	
2009	"Hard"	Rihanna feat. Young Jeezy	
2010	"Rude Boy"	Rihanna	
2010	"Put It in a Love Song"	Alicia Keys feat. Beyoncé	
2010	"Why Don't You Love Me"	Beyoncé	co-directed by Beyoncé
2010	"Rockstar 101"	Rihanna feat. Slash	
2010	"Gimmie Dat"	Ciara	
2011	"S&M"	Rihanna	co-directed by Rihanna
2011	"Move Your Body"	Beyoncé	
2011	"I'm into You"	Jennifer Lopez feat. Lil Wayne	
2011	"We Found Love"	Rihanna feat. Calvin Harris	
2011	"You da One"	Rihanna	
2012	"Your Body"	Christina Aguilera	
2012	"Losing You"	Solange	
2012	"Looking Hot"	No Doubt	
2012	"Keep You"	Wild Belle	
2013	"Pretty Hurts"	Beyoncé	
2013	"RUN"	Beyoncé and Jay-Z	
2016	"Formation"	Beyoncé	

=== Commercials ===
Year	Title	Client	Notes
2011	Year off	Target / Beyoncé	
2011	Fuel for Life	Diesel	
2012	All Originals Represent	Adidas	
2013	Change Lanes	Lexus	
2016	Pop	Stella McCartney / Grimes, Amandla Stenberg, Lola Leon, Kenya Kinski-Jones	
2017	Equality	Nike	
2020	You Love Me	Beats by Dr. Dre	Translation (ad agency)
2022	All Together	Calvin Klein	
2026	The Dreamer	Apple Inc.	

=== Television ===
Year	Title	Notes
2016–2021	Insecure	8 episodes, director and executive producer
2017	Master of None	2 episodes
2021	Y: The Last Man	Executive producer
2023	The Changeling	Director and executive producer

=== Film ===
Year	Title	Notes
2019	Queen & Slim	Also producer
2023	Renaissance: A Film by Beyoncé	Producer

== Awards and nominations ==
Year	Award or organization	Category	Nominee	Result	Ref.
2008	UK Music Video Awards	People Choice Awards	"Bleeding Love" (Leona Lewis)	Won	
2012	Antville Music Video Awards	Best Hip-Hop	"Losing You" (Solange Knowles)	Nominated	
2012	Antville Music Video Awards	Best Performance	"Losing You" (Solange Knowles)	Nominated	
2012	MTV Video Music Awards	Video of the Year	"We Found Love" (Rihanna with Calvin Harris)	Won	
2012	UK Music Video Awards	Best Pop Video – International	"We Found Love" (Rihanna with Calvin Harris)	Nominated	
2013	Grammy Awards	Best Music Video	"We Found Love" (Rihanna with Calvin Harris)	Won	
2013	Music Video Production Awards	Best Direction of a New Artist	"Losing You" (Solange Knowles)	Won	
2013	Music Video Production Awards	Best Direction of a Female Artist	"Losing You" (Solange Knowles)	Won	
2013	UK Music Video Awards	Best Pop Video – International	"Losing You" (Solange Knowles)	Won	
2014	Camerimage	Video of the Year	"Pretty Hurts" (Beyoncé)	Nominated	
2014	Camerimage	Best Cinematography	"Pretty Hurts" (Beyoncé)	Nominated	
2014	MTV Video Music Awards	Best Direction	"Pretty Hurts" (Beyoncé)	Nominated	
2016	Camerimage	Video of the Year	"Formation" (Beyoncé)	Nominated	
2016	Camerimage	Best Cinematography	"Formation" (Beyoncé)	Nominated	
2016	Cannes Lions International Festival	Excellence in Music Video	"Formation" (Beyoncé)	Gran Prix	
2016	Clio Awards	Video of the Year	"Formation" (Beyoncé)	Won	
2016	Kinsale Shark Awards	Best International Director Music Video	"Formation" (Beyoncé)	Won	
2016	Kinsale Shark Awards	Best International Music Video	"Formation" (Beyoncé)	Won	
2016	London International Awards	Best Music Video	"Formation" (Beyoncé)	Bronze	
2016	London International Awards	Music Video Direction	"Formation" (Beyoncé)	Bronze	
2016	MTV Video Music Awards	Video of the Year	"Formation" (Beyoncé)	Won	
2016	MTV Video Music Awards	Best Direction	"Formation" (Beyoncé)	Won	
2016	MTV Video Music Awards	Best Cinematography	"Formation" (Beyoncé)	Won	
2016	UK Music Video Awards	Best Urban Video - International	"Formation" (Beyoncé)	Nominated	
2016	UK Music Video Awards	Best Styling in a Video	"Formation" (Beyoncé)	Won	
2017	Black Reel Awards for Television	Outstanding Comedy Series	Insecure	Nominated	
2017	Black Reel Awards for Television	Outstanding Directing - Comedy Series	"Thanksgiving" (Master of None)	Nominated	
2017	Gold Derby Awards	Best Comedy Episode of the Year	"Thanksgiving" (Master of None)	Won	
2017	Grammy Awards	Best Music Video	"Formation" (Beyoncé)	Won	
2017	NAACP Image Awards	Outstanding Directing in a Comedy Series	"Insecure as F**k" (Insecure)	Nominated	
2017	Webby Awards	Best Music Video - People's Voice	"Formation" (Beyoncé)	Won	
2017	Webby Awards	Best Music Video	"Formation" (Beyoncé)	Nominated	
2018	Black Reel Awards for Television	Outstanding Comedy Series	Insecure	Nominated	
2018	Black Reel Awards for Television	Outstanding Directing - Comedy Series	"Hella Perspective" (Insecure)	Nominated	
2018	Directors Guild of America Awards	Outstanding Directorial Achievement in Comedy Series	"Thanksgiving" (Master of None)	Nominated	
2019	American Film Institute	Franklin J. Schaffner Alumni Medal	Herself	Won	
2019	African-American Film Critics Association	Impact Award	Queen & Slim	Won	
2019	African-American Film Critics Association	Top 10 Best Films	Queen & Slim	Won	
2019	Austin Film Critics Association Awards	Best First Film	Queen & Slim	Nominated	
2019	Florida Film Critics Circle	Best First Film	Queen & Slim	Won	
2019	Los Angeles Online Film Critics Society Awards	Best First Feature	Queen & Slim	Nominated	
2019	National Board of Review Awards	Best Directorial Debut	Queen & Slim	Won	
2019	Online Association of Female Film Critics Awards	Breakthrough Filmmaker	Queen & Slim	Nominated	
2019	Online Film Critics Society	Best Debut Feature	Queen & Slim	Nominated	
2019	Toronto Film Critics Association Awards	Best First Feature	Queen & Slim	Nominated	
2020	BET Awards	Best Movie	Queen & Slim	Won	
2020	Black Reel Awards	Outstanding Motion Picture	Queen & Slim	Nominated	
2020	Black Reel Awards	Outstanding Director	Queen & Slim	Nominated	
2020	Black Reel Awards	Outstanding Emerging Director	Queen & Slim	Won	
2020	Directors Guild of America Awards	Outstanding Directing - First Time Feature Film	Queen & Slim	Nominated	
2020	Hawaii Film Critics Society Awards	Best First Film	Queen & Slim	Nominated	
2020	Hawaii Film Critics Society Awards	Best New Filmmaker	Queen & Slim	Nominated	
2020	NAACP Image Awards	Outstanding Motion Picture	Queen & Slim	Nominated	
2020	NAACP Image Awards	Outstanding Independent Motion Picture	Queen & Slim	Nominated	
2020	Primetime Emmy Awards	Outstanding Comedy Series	Insecure	Nominated	
2020	Black Reel Awards for Television	Outstanding Comedy Series	Insecure	Won	
2021	Directors Guild of America Awards	Outstanding Directorial Achievement in Commercials	Beats by Dre: You Love Me	Won	
2022	NAACP Image Awards	Outstanding Directing in a Comedy Series	"Reunited, Okay?!" (Insecure)	Nominated	
