= Block Music =

Studio album by Shawnna
- Released: June 6, 2006
- Recorded: 2005–06
- Genre: Dirty rap; R&B
- Length: 56:18
- Label: Def Jam South; Disturbing tha Peace
- Producer: Chaka Zulu (exec.); Jeff Dixon (exec.); Ludacris (exec.); 110% Pure; Brian "B-Crucial" Morton; Chucky Thompson; Hitmaka; JFK; J.U.S.T.I.C.E. League; L; Salaam Remi; StayBent Krunk-a-Delic; TC Love; Tony Dinero; Vudu Spellz; Xcel

Shawnna chronology
Worth tha Weight (2004)	Block Music (2006)

Singles from Block Music
- 1. "Gettin' Some" Released: March 7, 2006

Block Music is the second solo studio album by American rapper Shawnna. It was released on June 6, 2006 on Def Jam South Recordings and Disturbing tha Peace. Production was handled by several record producers, including Vudu, 110% Pure, Chucky Thompson, J.U.S.T.I.C.E. League and Salaam Remi. It features guest appearances from Buddy Guy, Ludacris, Avant, Bobby V, I-20, Johnny P., Lil Wayne, Malik Yusef, Pharrell Williams, Shareefa, Smoke of Field Mob, Syleena Johnson, Too Short, 8Ball & MJG. The album peaked at number 13 on the Billboard 200. Its lead single, "Gettin' Some", was certified platinum by the Recording Industry Association of America.

== Critical reception ==
Professional ratings
Review scores
Source	Rating
AllMusic	4/5 stars
PopMatters	6/10 stars
RapReviews	5.5/10
Robert Christgau	(dud)
USA Today	3/4 stars
XXL	4/5 (XL)

Block Music received mixed reviews from music critics. Andy Kellman of AllMusic gave high praise to Shawnna's ability to portray different emotions and deliver topics with complex writing over energetic production, saying that, "With a surprising level of depth and a more complementary set of productions, Block Music makes Worth tha Weight – a decent album in its own right – seem like a clumsy warm-up." Alvin Blanco of XXL also commended Shawnna for side-stepping her usual sex-filled braggadocio to reveal more introspective material delivered in both hard-hitting and soft-spoken styles, concluding that "Offering up more of herself this go-round, Shawnna shows considerable growth. Maybe now she can finally get some… props." Steve Jones of USA Today gave Block Music a three-star rating, praising her lyrical ability and confident flow. He highlighted her collaborations with Ludacris, Pharrell, Lil Wayne, and Too Short, while noting that tracks such as "In tha Chi" and "Can't Break Me" showcased her strongest material.

PopMatters contributor Quentin B. Huff wrote: "Shawnna's song arrangement effectively binds the various topics of her tunes because she's convincing. Sure, there's some posturing and, yeah, she's exaggerating reality a bit. But, just like the movies, where you know an actor or actress isn't performing all the stunts, the trick is to make you suspend your disbelief. And in this regard, Shawnna plays her part with gusto while demonstrating that, sometimes, you get more than what you see." Conversely, Steve "Flash" Juon of RapReviews was unimpressed by Shawnna's lyrics consisting of "every major gangster rap cliche" over quality beats, concluding that: "There's nothing profound about "Block Music" other than how profoundly UNENJOYABLE I found listening to it to be. In fact I think the only enjoyment one could find out of this album would be that if you got horny enough you could masturbate to Shawnna's pictures – that's about it." The blogger made similar sexual references regarding the artist in his 2004 rating of her debut album. Robert Christgau graded the album as a "dud", indicating "a bad record whose details rarely merit further thought."

== Track listing ==
No.	Title	Writer(s)	Producer(s)	Length
1.	"Can't Do It Like Me"	Rashawnna Guy; Carl Thompson	Chucky Thompson	2:52
2.	"Block Music (Bang)" (featuring I-20)	R. Guy; Bobby Sandimanie; Matthew McAllister	Vudu	3:40
3.	"Damn" (featuring Smoke)	R. Guy; Darion Crawford; Brian Morton; Tony Ratliff	Brian "B-Crucial" Morton; Tony Dinero	4:19
4.	"Gettin' Some Remix" (featuring Ludacris, Pharrell Williams, Lil Wayne & Too $hort)	R. Guy; Christopher Bridges; Pharrell Williams; Dwayne Carter; Todd Shaw; Bryant Bell	Xcel	5:42
5.	"Candy Coated" (featuring 8Ball & MJG)	R. Guy; Marlon Goodwin; Premro Smith; McAllister	Vudu	4:33
6.	"Roll Wit Me"	R. Guy; M.J. Bradley	110% Pure	2:29
7.	"In tha Chi" (featuring Johnny P. & Syleena Johnson)	R. Guy; John Pigram; McAllister	Vudu	4:17
8.	"Take It Slow" (featuring Ludacris & Bobby Valentino)	R. Guy; Bridges; Bobby Wilson; Leonard Williams; T.C. Love	L; TC Love	4:12
9.	"Can't Break Me" (featuring Buddy Guy & Shareefa)	R. Guy; Shareefa Cooper; Erik Ortiz; Kevin Crowe; Cliff Brown III	J.U.S.T.I.C.E. League	4:13
10.	"Ghetto Fairy Tales"	R. Guy; McAllister	Vudu	3:02
11.	"Lil Daddy What's Good"	R. Guy; Hernst Bellevue; Salaam Remi Gibbs	StayBent Krunk-a-Delic; Salaam Remi	3:38
12.	"Hit the Back/Slide In"	R. Guy; Christian Ward; Bradley	110% Pure	4:22
13.	"Chicago" (featuring Buddy Guy, Avant & Malik Yusef)	R. Guy; George Guy; Malik Yusef; Jason Fleming; Ward	The Yung Bosses	5:36
14.	"Gettin' Some"	R. Guy; Bell; Shaw; Ramon Gooden; Stuart Jordan	Xcel	3:23
Total length:				56:18

== Charts ==
Chart (2004)	Peak position
US Billboard 200	13
US Top R&B/Hip-Hop Albums (Billboard)	3
US Top Rap Albums (Billboard)	2
