= Self Explanatory =

Self Explanatory may refer to:

- Self Explanatory (I-20 album), 2004
- Self Explanatory (Classified album), 2009
