= Salaam Remi =

American record producer (born 1972)

- Also known as: Chameleon; Salaamremi.com
- Born: Salaam Remi Gibbs; May 14, 1972 (age 54); Queens, New York City, U.S.
- Genres: Hip-hop; R&B; pop
- Occupation: Record producer
- Years active: 1986–present
- Labels: Louder Than Life; Sony Music
- Member of: No Panty
- Website: salaamremi.com

Salaam Remi Gibbs (born May 14, 1972) is an American record producer. He is most known for producing material for close associates Nas, Amy Winehouse, and Jazmine Sullivan, but has also produced for other mainstream acts including Alicia Keys, the Fugees, Doja Cat, Miguel, Fergie, Alessia Cara, Nelly Furtado, and Estelle, among others. Gibbs is noted for his reggae-tinged (often referred to as "broken-bottle") approach to production.

After ten Grammy Award nominations, Gibbs won Best Compilation Soundtrack for Visual Media for his work on The United States vs. Billie Holiday soundtrack (2021). In 2016 he formed the group No Panty, with rappers Bodega Bamz, Joell Ortiz and Nitty Scott, and released the mixtape Westside Highway Story, which he produced entirely.

== Biography ==
=== Early life and career beginnings ===
Salaam Remi Gibbs was born in Queens, New York to a Trinidadian mother and Barbadian father, studio musician Van Joseph Gibbs. Remi first appeared on record as the keyboard player on Kurtis Blow's 1986 release Kingdom Blow. In the late 1980s, Remi began mixing records. His first full production was in 1992, for the hip-hop group Zhigge. He worked with the Fugees and Black Sheep.

Salaam Remi has been associated with releases like Lil' Flip's "I Need Mine", Ini Kamoze's "Here Comes the Hotstepper", The Fugees' multi-platinum The Score LP, and Toni Braxton's "You're Makin' Me High". He produced 10 tracks on the 2002 UK sensation Ms. Dynamite's album titled A Little Deeper, including the hugely successful lead single "Dy-Na-Mi-Tee", which had moderate crossover success in the U.S. market.

Remi contributed tracks to Jurassic 5's 2006 LP Feedback and Nas's 2006 album Hip Hop Is Dead, and racked up production credits on Frank, the platinum debut from North London soul-jazz singer Amy Winehouse. He worked on Winehouse's followup, Back to Black, and was producing her third album that was to be released in 2011, up until her death. Remi worked with Nelly Furtado on her first Spanish language album, Mi Plan. His projects in late 2008 included working with Jazmine Sullivan, Nas, Leona Lewis and Corinne Bailey Rae.

Remi has also done film work. He worked on the soundtracks for Office Space, Zoolander, The Departed, Blood Diamond, and Sex and the City. He also scored the Mike Tyson documentary, TYSON, worked as executive music producer on After the Sunset and Rush Hour 3, and was music supervisor and composer for a 2008 TV pilot called Blue Blood. Salaam Remi was nominated for Non-Classical Producer of the Year at the 55th Grammy Awards, an award won by Dan Auerbach.

== Louder Than Life ==
In 2013, Remi launched his own label imprint, Louder Than Life, as an imprint of Sony Music, with two subimprints, Re Mi Fa Music and Flying Buddha Records. Its first signee, actor Tristan Wilds issued his debut studio album, New York: A Love Story (2013) through the label, becoming its first release and entering the Billboard 200. Since then, Remi has released multiple collaborative albums under Louder Than Life, including BoxTalk (2019) with Joell Ortiz, Northside of Linden and Westside of Slauson both with Terrace Martin, as well as Remi's compilation album Black On Purpose (2020), which featured guest performances from Busta Rhymes, Nas, Jennifer Hudson, Black Thought, CeeLo Green, Mumu Fresh, Doug E. Fresh, Bilal, Teedra Moses, D-Nice, Mack Wilds, Common, Case, Betty Wright, James Poyser, Stephen Marley, Anthony Hamilton, Syleena Johnson, Super Cat, Spragga Benz, and Chronixx.

== Awards and nominations ==
=== Ivor Novello Awards ===
Year	Nominee / work	Award	Result
2004	"Stronger Than Me"	Best Contemporary Song	Won

=== Grammy Awards ===
Year	Nominee / Work	Award	Result
1996	The Score	Album of the Year	Nominated
2007	Back to Black	Album of the Year	Nominated
2008	"Bust Your Windows"	Best R&B Song	Nominated
2009	"Lions, Tigers & Bears"	Best R&B Song	Nominated
2012	"Beautiful Surprise"	Best R&B Song	Nominated
2012	Salaam Remi	Producer of the Year, Non-Classical	Nominated
2013	One: In The Chamber	Best Urban Contemporary Album	Nominated
2017	Amy	Best Compilation Soundtrack for Visual Media	Nominated
2018	"Come Through and Chill"	Best R&B Song	Nominated
2022	The United States vs. Billie Holiday	Best Compilation Soundtrack for Visual Media	Won

== Production discography ==
Executive Production
Year	Album/Film	Artist
2005	After the Sunset	[Film]
2007	Rush Hour 3	[Film]
2008	Sex and the City	[Film]
2008	Fearless	Jazmine Sullivan
2010	Sex and the City 2	[Film]
2010	Love Me Back	Jazmine Sullivan
2012	Tawk Tomahawk	Hiatus Kaiyote
2014	Definitely NOW	Liam Bailey
2015	Reality Show	Jazmine Sullivan
2015	Choose Your Weapon	Hiatus Kaiyote

Releases
Year	Song/Album Title	Artist
1986	"Magilla Gorilla" from Back By Popular Demand	Kurtis Blow
1990	"Fire" (Remix)	Aswad feat. Shabba Ranks
1990	"Blue and UK Blak" (Remix)	Caron Wheeler
1990	"Let's Do It" (Remix)	Jamalski
1991	"No Favors"; "What You're Used To"; "Feel Ya Way" from Now, That's More Like It	Craig G
1991	"Understanding" (Remix)	State of Art
1991	"Piece of My Heart" (Remix)	Tara Kemp
1991	"Just a Little Bit Longer" (Remix)	Maxi Priest
1991	"Cozmik" (Remix)	Ziggy Marley and the Melody Makers
1992	"Voice of da Ghetto"	Fu-Schnickens
1992	"The Heads"; "Unity"; "And the Road"; "Mack Daddy Dancehall"; Bobby Konders & Massive Sounds	Bobby Konders
1992	Zhigge	Zhigge
1992	"Dead End Street" (Remix)	Mad Cobra w/ Geto Boys
1992	"Booty Mission" (Remix)	Runaway Slaves
1992	"Twice My Age" (Remix)	Shabba Ranks
1992	"Slow & Sexy" (Hip Hop Mix)	Shabba Ranks w/ Johnny Gill
1992	"Ghetto Red" (Hip Hop Remix)	Supercat
1992	"Don Da Da" (Remix)	Supercat
1992	"The Money Grip" (Remix)	Doug E. Fresh
1992	"Shamrocks & Shennanigans (Boom-Sha-Lack-Boom)" [Remix]	House of Pain
1992	"Are You Ready" (Remix)	Shomari
1993	"Family Affair"; Addams Family Values: Music from the Motion Picture	Shabba Ranks w/ Patra & Terri & Monica
1993	"Young Girl Bluez"; "The Gator"; All Samples Cleared!	Biz Markie
1993	"Can't Stop We (Remix)"	Prince Ital Joe w/ Markie Mark
1993	"Think (About It)" (Hip Hop Remix); "Worker Man (Remix)"	Patra
1993	"Love Is the Answer" (Remix)	Bad Brains
1993	"Six Million Ways to Die"	Funkmaster Flex w/ N9ne
1993	"Born in the Ghetto" (Remix)	Funky Poets
1994	"Here Comes The Hotstepper" (Heartical Mix); Here Comes The Hotstepper	Ini Kamoze
1994	"Best of My Love (Boss Groove Mix)"	C.J. Lewis
1994	"Greetings"; "Life of a Shorty"; Destination Brooklyn	Vicious
1994	"Just Can't Stand It"; "Remember We" (Remix); Ambushed	Da Bush Babees
1994	"Keep It Right There (Remix)"	Changing Faces
1994	"Nappy Heads" (Remix); "Vocab" (Salaam's Remix)	Fugees
1994	"South Central" (Remix)	Supercat
1994	"Sixth Street" (Remix)	Worl A Girl
1994	"Turn It Up Even Louder (Salaam's Ghetto Shhhhh Remix)"	Raja-Nee
1994	"Without a Doubt" (Remix)	Black Sheep
1994	"Hold On" (Remix)	Brand Nubian
1994	"Sound Boy Killing" (Remix)	Mega Banton
1994	"Mothers and Fathers"/"Original Woman"; "Let's Get It On" (Salaam's Radio Mix)	Shabba Ranks
1995	"Why You Treat Me So Bad (Remix)"	Shaggy w/ Grand Puba
1995	"Pull Up to the Bumper" (Salaam's Party Mix); "Banana"; "Time Fi Wine"; "Goin' to the Chapel"; Scent of Attraction	Patra
1995	"More & More"; "A Day in da Stuy"	Major Stress
1995	"Craziest (Salaam Remi Mix)"	Naughty By Nature
1995	"Lock It Up"; "Homicide Ride"; "Alpha and Omega"; Station Identification	Channel Live
1995	"Brooklyn Movements"; Blue in the Face	Da Bush Babees
1995	"Set It Off"	Greg Nice
1995	"No Pain No Gain (Remix)"	Buckshot LeFonque
1995	"Bad Boy No Go to Jail"; "Blast of the Iron" Clockers (soundtrack)	Mega Banton; Rebelz of Authority
1995	"Hardcore Lovin"; Uncommonly Smooth	Spragga Benz
1995	"Fu-Gee-La"; The Score	Fugees
1996	"Ready or Not (Salaam's Ready for the Show Remix)" Bootleg Versions	Fugees
1996	"Studda Step"; Biz Markie's Greatest Hits	Biz Markie
1996	"Lift Off" (Salaam Remix); We The People	Groove Collective
1996	"Virtual Insanity" (Salaam Remi Remix)	Jamiroquai
1996	"You're Makin Me High" (Norfside Remix)	Toni Braxton
1996	"Trippin'" (Remix)"	Mark Morrison
1996	"Fast Life" (Norfside Remix)	Kool G Rap w/ Nas
1996	"Leaving" (Remix)	Tony Rich
1997	"Bubblegoose"; The Carnival	Wyclef Jean
1997	"We Tryin to Stay Alive" (Salaam Remix); "Bubblegoose - Bakin' Cake"	Wyclef Jean, Refugee All-Stars
1997	"Guantanamera" (Roxanne Roxanne/ Oye Como Va Remix)	Wyclef Jean, Beenie Man, Ky-Mani Marley
1997	"Stallion Ride"; "Mommy Dearest"; Hear My Cry	Rayvon
1997	"Much Love (Remix)"	Shola Ama
1997	"Touch and Play"; Touch and Play	Reign
1997	"Lady (Girls Look So Good) [Remix]"	PLFD
1997	"Back for Good"; "Send My Love/One for Your Love"; Yardcore	Born Jamericans
1997	"The Sweetest Thing" (Mahogany Mix)	Refugee Camp All Stars w/ Lauryn Hill
1998	Cheated (To All the Girls) EP	Wyclef Jean
1998	"Frowsey"; Ghetto Supastar	Pras
1998	"My Love Is Your Love" (Remix)	Whitney Houston
1998	"Born to Win"; Poly Sci	John Forté
1998	"Feelin' You"	Ali
1999	"Star" (Remix)	Caron Wheeler
2000	"Where Fugee At"; The Ecleftic: 2 Sides II a Book	Wyclef Jean
2000	"Wow"; Run Cool	Positive Black Soul
2000	"I've Got a Date"; "Love Me Now" (Remix); Art and Life	Beenie Man
2000	"Watch Who You Beef Wit"; 2000 B.C. (Before Can-I-Bus)	Canibus
2000	"Rude Boy"; "Party's On"; The Journey	Ky-Mani Marley
2000	"Amor" (Remix)	Ricky Martin
2001	"Block Party"; "Let Me Live"; "True Confessions"; Eye Legacy	Lisa Lopes
2001	"What Goes Around"; Stillmatic	Nas
2001	"No Playaz"; "Ladies & Gents"; "Live at Jimmy's"; "Breathe"; "Coast to Coast"; Up Close and Personal	Angie Martinez
2001	"Tina Colada"; Fly	Dante Thomas
2001	"Josephine"	DL
2001	"Badman Bizness"; FB Entertainment Presents: The Good Life	Beenie Man
2001	"Do da Right Thing"	City High
2001	"Can We Get Up"	Exhale
2001	"See Saw"; Same High	Xtatik & Machel Montano
2001	"Souverain" (NY Remix)	Doc Gyneco
2002	"Made You Look"; "Get Down"; "Zone Out"; "Hey Nas"; "I Can"; God's Son	Nas
2002	"Manana"; Ceremony: Remixes & Rarities	Carlos Santana
2002	"So Good"; Animal House	Angie Martinez
2002	A Little Deeper	Ms. Dynamite
2002	"Shape of My Heart" (Remix)	Sugababes w/ Sting
2003	Breathe"; Bittersweet	Blu Cantrell w/ Sean Paul
2003	"Strawbereez"; "Can't Get It Back"; Eye Candy	Misteeq
2003	Frank	Amy Winehouse
2003	"Whenever" (Remix)	Sting w/ Mary J. Blige
2004	"Nazareth Savage"; "Sekou Story"; "Suicide Bounce"; "Bridging the Gap"; "War"; "You Know My Style"; "No One Else in the Room"; "Virgo"; Street's Disciple	Nas
2004	"I Got It"; "My Lady"; "Dancing Like Makin' Love"; Kevin Lyttle	Kevin Lyttle
2004	"1 on 1"; "Do the Damn Thing"; 1 On 1	Rupee
2004	"Tempted to Touch" (Remix)	Rupee
2004	"Meet the Dealer"; "Point 'Em Out"; "Fighting in the Club"; "The Realist"; Self Explanatory	I-20
2004	"Night & Day" (Remix)	Dawn Penn
2004	"Young at Heart"	Joss Stone
2005	"I'll Be Around"; Disturbing Tha Peace	Shareefa
2005	"Talk of New York" Car Show Tour	Funkmaster Flex w/ Nas
2006	"Payaso"; The Underdog/El Subestimado	Tego Calderón
2006	"Me & Mr. Jones"; "Just Friends"; "Tears Dry (on Their Own)"; "Some Unholy War"; "Addicted"; Back to Black	Amy Winehouse
2006	"Radio"; "Get It Together"; "End Up Like This"; Feedback	Jurassic 5
2006	"Where Are They Now"; "Who Killed It?"; "The N"; "Shine On"; "Where Y'all At?"; Hip Hop Is Dead	Nas
2006	"Lil Daddy What's Good"; Block Music	Shawnna
2006	"How Good Luv Feels"; Point of No Return	Shareefa
2007	"Can't Get It Back"; Blaque By Popular Demand	Blaque
2007	"Forgiveness"; Spirit	Leona Lewis
2007	"Good Girl"; "In This for You"; I Am	Chrisette Michele
2007	"B Boy Baby"; Real Girl	Mutya Buena
2008	"Bust Your Windows"; "Lions, Tigers & Bears"; "Call Me Guilty"; "Live a Lie"; Fearless	Jazmine Sullivan
2008	"I Did It for Sho"; The Point of It All	Anthony Hamilton
2008	"I Don't Know"; Intuition	Jamie Foxx
2008	"Trust Me"; The Reason	Lemar
2008	"Open"; After My Time	Noel Gourdin
2008	"Labels or Love"; The Dutchess	Fergie
2008	"You Can't Stop Us Now"; Untitled Nas album	Nas
2009	"Now I'm That Bitch"	Livvi Franc
2009	"Fuerte"; "Suficiente Tiempo"; Mi Plan	Nelly Furtado
2009	Praguenosis	Salaam Remi
2009	"Falling in Love Again" (Salaam Mix)	Marvin Gaye
2009	"ABC (Salaam Remi Remix)"; The Remix Suite	Michael Jackson
2010	"This Is the Way"; Shotta Culture	Spragga Benz
2010	"On a Mission"	Gabriella Climanca w/ Eve
2010	"All I Want Is You"; All I Want Is You	Miguel w/ J. Cole
2010	"10 Seconds"; "Love You Long Time"; "Stuttering"; Love Me Back	Jazmine Sullivan
2010	"Bodies"; "Love Fun"; "Old Fashioned"; "Fool for You"; The Lady Killer	CeeLo Green
2010	"Rapture"; Sex and the City 2	Alicia Keys
2010	"Follow Us"; Sir Lucious Left Foot: The Son of Chico Dusty	Big Boi
2010	"Cold Shoulder"; Love.Live.Life	N-Dubz
2010	"Night Is Young"; "Girlfriend in the City"; The Best of Nelly Furtado	Nelly Furtado
2011	"Back to Love"; Back To Love	Anthony Hamilton
2011	"Don't Look Down"; "Feeling Good"; I Remember Me	Jennifer Hudson
2011	"You Better Leave Me"	Liam Bailey
2011	"Play the Guitar"	B.o.B
2011	"Hater"; Go	Delilah
2011	Lioness: Hidden Treasures	Amy Winehouse
2011	"BGTY"; Pieces of Me	Ledisi
2012	"Kaleidoscope Dream"; "How Many Drinks?"; Kaleidoscope Dream	Miguel
2012	"Cry"; New Life	Monica
2012	"Running" This Girlie Life	Melanie Fiona
2012	"Girl on Fire"; Girl on Fire	Alicia Keys
2012	"A Queens Story"; "The Don"; "Nasty"; "World's an Addiction"; "Cherry Wine"; "Bye Baby"; "Black Bond"; Life Is Good	Nas
2012	"Something"; "The Most Beautiful Thing"; "Enemy"; "End Game"; "Skylight"; "Soak It Up"; The Spirit Indestructible	Nelly Furtado
2012	"Should Be You"; "Alone with You"; R.E.D.	Ne-Yo
2012	"Beautiful Surprise"; Beautiful Surprise	Tamia
2012	"Never Kissed You" Nicole and Natalie"	Nina Sky
2013	"New Tattoo"; James Arthur	James Arthur
2013	New York: A Love Story	Mack Wilds
2013	"Forgive Me"; Lip Lock	Eve
2015	"Veins"; "Mascara"; "Dumb" Jasmine Sullivan	Reality Show
2015	"Lava"; "Clocks" My Garden	Kat Dahlia
2015	"Face the Sun" Wildheart	Miguel
2016	"Take You Home"; "Amen"; What I'm Feelin'	Anthony Hamilton
2016	"Louder Than Life"; "Cinco de Melli"	Louder Than Life Crew
2016	"My Baby Just Cares for Me" Nina Simone Tributes	Usher
2016	Monaco '79	The Champagne Flutes, Salaam Remi, Terri Walker
2016	N15	Miraa May
2017	"Pineapple Skies"; "Come Through and Chill"; War & Leisure	Miguel
2017	"Gonna Be Alright"; The Transition of Mali	Mali Music
2017	"Don't Test Me"; "Can't Get Enough"; "Somebody Knows"; "One in the Same"; The King & I	Faith Evans
2018	"Love Conquers All"	Anthony Hamilton
2018	"Leave It Smokin'"; Passion Like Fire	Tamia
2018	"Sunny Daze"; "Bambina"; "My Chateau"; "MouthTrumpet"; South Beach Social Club EP	Salaam Remi & Kat Dahlia
2018	"March Thirteenth"	Shila J
2018	Streams of Thought, Vol. 2	Black Thought
2019	"The Grass" Grass Is Greener (soundtrack)	The Lox
2019	Bodega's Way	Bodega Bamz
2019	BoxTalk	Joell Ortiz
2019	Northside of Linden, Westside of Slauson	Terrace Martin
2019	"Dreams, Fairytales, Fantasies" Floor Seats	ASAP Ferg w/ Brent Faiyaz
2019	"Rules" Hot Pink	Doja Cat
2020	Black On Purpose	Salaam Remi
2021	"Shape Shifter"	Alessia Cara
2022	"Sincerely Yours" Autograph	Joell Ortiz

== Filmography ==
Releases
Year	Title	Artist(s)
1995	"Bad Boy No Go A Jail"; Clockers	Mega Banton
1995	"Blast of Da Iron"; Clockers	Rebelz of Authority co-prod with Calvin (Trouble) Jones
2004	After the Sunset	Executively Produced by Salaam Remi
2007	"Less Than An Hour"; Rush Hour 3	Nas & CeeLo Green
2007	"L'Amour une Aventure"; Rush Hour 3	Salaam Remi & Katia Cadet
2007	"The Closer I get To You"; Rush Hour 3	Jackie Chan & Chris Tucker
2007	"Who Made The Tater Salad"; Rush Hour 3	Salaam Remi & Vincent Henry
2009	"TYSON"	Scored by Salaam Remi
2011	"Love Is Your Color"; Sex and the City 2	Leona Lewis & Jennifer Hudson
2019	"Grass Is Greener"; Grass Is Greener	Salaam Remi
2021	The United States vs. Billie Holiday	Executively Produced by Salaam Remi
