= Gettin' Some =

Single by Shawnna

from the album Block Music and Disturbing tha Peace
- Released: December 3, 2005
- Recorded: 2005
- Genre: Dirty rap
- Length: 3:21 (Original version); 5:41 (Album Remix); 7:30 (Extended Remix)
- Label: Disturbing tha Peace; Def Jam
- Songwriters: Rashawnna Guy; Bryant Bell; Todd Shaw; Stuart Jordan; Ramone Gooden
- Producer: Xcel

Shawnna singles chronology
"Weight a Minute" (2003)	"Gettin' Some" (2005)	"Damn" (2006)

Music video
- "Gettin' Some" on YouTube

Professional ratings
Review scores
Source	Rating
AllMusic	3/5 stars

"Gettin' Some" (explicitly titled "Gettin' Some Head" in the explicit version) is a song by American hip hop recording artist Shawnna. It was released on December 3, 2005, via Disturbing tha Peace/Def Jam Recordings as a single from her second studio album Block Music. The original version of "Gettin' Some" appears on Block Music as a hidden track. The song samples Too Short's "Blowjob Betty".

The radio edit of the song features rapper Ludacris. The song is a reference to oral sex as the rappers tell in the song's chorus about receiving oral sex from women. The popularity of the song earned Shawnna her first platinum certification as a solo artist by the Recording Industry Association of America on December 6, 2006. The music video included Chicago model Candy Brooks as the "oohs and aahs girl".

== Remixes ==
The official remix that can be found on the Block Music album features Too Short, Pharrell Williams, Ludacris and Lil Wayne. Another remix featuring Rick Ross, Pimp C and the same Lil' Wayne verse can be found on the official Disturbing tha Peace mixtape The DTP Takeover: Its An Epidemic. An extended remix was released on Shawnna's mixtape Block Party - The Mixtape featuring all the artists from the previous remixes, along with Dre of Cool & Dre, Shawn J of Field Mob, Pitbull, Fat Joe, Twista, Busta Rhymes and Jim Jones. Busta Rhymes' verse from this remix is taken from the mixtape freestyle he did over the beat with his artist Labba. Along with providing a verse for the official remix, Lil Wayne also recorded new verses to the instrumental on his 2006 mixtape Dedication 2. This version featured Pharrell's verse from the official remix.

== Track listing ==
12" vinyl
No.	Title	Producer(s)	Length
1.	"Gettin' Some (Clean)" (performed by Shawnna)	Xcel
2.	"Gettin' Some (Main)" (performed by Shawnna)	Xcel
3.	"Gettin' Some (Instrumental)" (performed by Shawnna)	Xcel
4.	"I'll Be Around" (performed by Shareefa)	Salaam Remi
5.	"That's My Shit" (performed by Ludacris, Field Mob, Playaz Circle and Perfect Harmany)	The Trak Starz
6.	"DTP for Life" (performed by Ludacris, I-20 and Lil' Fate)	Salaam Remi; Staybent Krunk-a-Delic

== Charts ==
=== Weekly charts ===
Chart (2006)	Peak position
US Billboard Hot 100	31
US Hot R&B/Hip-Hop Songs (Billboard)	4
US Hot Rap Songs (Billboard)	5
US Rhythmic Airplay (Billboard)	16
US Radio Songs (Billboard)	18

=== Year-end charts ===
Chart (2006)	Position
US Hot R&B/Hip-Hop Songs (Billboard)	35

== Certifications ==
Region	Certification	Certified units/sales
United States (RIAA)	Platinum	1,000,000^{^}
^{^} Shipments figures based on certification alone.
