= Disturbing tha Peace (album) =

Ludacris Presents Disturbing tha Peace

Compilation album by Ludacris and Disturbing tha Peace
- Released: December 13, 2005
- Genre: Hip hop
- Length: 63:12
- Label: Disturbing tha Peace; Ebony Son; Def Jam South
- Producer: Vudu, Needlz, Xcel, Myshmaster, Polow da Don, SALAAM, The Trak Starz, Staybent Krunk-a-Delic, DJ Toomp, LT Moe, Buckwild

Ludacris and Disturbing tha Peace chronology
Golden Grain (2002)	Ludacris Presents Disturbing tha Peace (2005)

Singles from Ludacris Presents: Disturbing tha Peace
- 1. "Georgia" Released: October 9, 2005; 2. "Gettin' Some" Released: May 30, 2006; 3. "Two Miles an Hour (Remix)" Released: 2006

Professional ratings
Review scores
Source	Rating
Allmusic	3.5/5 stars
HipHopDX	2.5/5 stars
IGN	(5.8/10)
Los Angeles Times	3/4 stars
The Phoenix	1.5/4 stars
RapReviews	(5/10)
Stylus Magazine	B−
USA Today	3/4 stars

Disturbing tha Peace is the second compilation album released by record label Disturbing tha Peace. Artists who appear on the album include Ludacris, Bobby V, I-20 and Shawnna. This album has been certified Gold by the RIAA.

The first single from the album was "Georgia" by Ludacris and Field Mob featuring Jamie Foxx. The original edition featured lyrics from Ray Charles's "Georgia On My Mind", but a disagreement with his recording company led to a re-recording of the song. The second single was Shawnna's only song on the album, "Gettin' Some".

== Track listing ==
Credits adapted from the album's liner notes.

No.	Title	Writer(s)	Producer(s)	Length
1.	"Intro" (Ludacris)			0:26
2.	"Georgia" (Ludacris & Field Mob featuring Jamie Foxx)	Matthew McAllister; Christopher Bridges; Darion Crawford; Shawn Johnson; Hoagy Carmichael; Stuart Gorrell	Vudu	4:21
3.	"Put Ya Hands Up" (Norfclk)	Khari Cain; Sheldon Bullock; Derrick Chavis; Princeton Terry	Needlz	5:18
4.	"Word on The Street (Skit)" (Miss Shyneka of Hot 107.9)			0:37
5.	"Gettin' Some" (Shawnna)	Bryant Bell; Rashawnna Guy; Todd Shaw; Ramon Gooden; Stuart Jordan	Excel	3:23
6.	"Come See Me" (Smoke featuring Stat Quo)	Adam Cherrington; Crawford; Stanley Benton; Anand Bakshi; Laxmikant–Pyarelal	Wyshmaster	3:44
7.	"Break a Nigga Off" (Lil' Fate featuring Rich Boy & Gangsta Boo)	Jamal Jones; Arbie Wilson; Marece Richards; Lola Mitchell	Polow da Don	3:41
8.	"Skit" (Ludacris)			0:08
9.	"I'll Be Around" (Shareefa)	Shareefa Cooper; Ryan Toby; Salaam Remi Gibbs; Phil Guilbeau	Salaam Remi	3:54
10.	"Sweet Revenge" (Ludacris)	Bridges; Alonzo Lee; Shamar Daugherty	The Trak Starz	5:06
11.	"DTP for Life" (Ludacris featuring I-20 & Lil' Fate)	Hernst Bellevue; Gibbs; Bridges; Bobby Sandimanie; A. Wilson	Staybent Krunk-A-Delic; Salaam Remi	4:37
12.	"Two Miles an Hour (Remix)" (Ludacris featuring Playaz Circle)	Bridges; Aldrin Davis; Curtis Mayfield; Tauheed Epps; Earl Conyers	DJ Toomp	4:23
13.	"Table Dance" (Bobby Valentino featuring Smoke & Lil' Fate)	Todd Moore; Bobby Wilson; Courtney Stewart; Gregory Colbert; Jamal Tandy; Crawford; A. Wilson	LT Moe	3:56
14.	"That's My Shit" (Ludacris featuring Field Mob, Playaz Circle & Perfect Harmany)	Lee; Daugherty; Bridges; Conyers; Epps; Johnson; Crawford; Terry	The Trak Starz	4:53
15.	"You Ain't Got Enough" (Playaz Circle & I-20)	Anthony Best; Epps; Conyers; Sandimanie; Tom Brock; Barry White; Robert Relf	Buckwild	4:33
16.	"Family Affair" (Ludacris featuring Shareefa, Lil' Fate, Playaz Circle, Norfclk, Field Mob & I-20)	Khaled Khaled; Cooper; A. Wilson; Epps; Conyers; Chavis; Terry; Bullock; Crawford; Johnson; Sandimanie; Bridges; King Floyd	DJ Khaled	7:03
17.	"Blood In The Air" (Bonus Track) (Lazyeye featuring Shawn Jay & Small World)	Paul Lewow; Chris Giessen; Jacob Heaven; Johnson; Bullock	Lazyeye	2:59

Sample Credits

- "Georgia" contains an interpolation from "Georgia on My Mind", written by Hoagy Carmichael and Stuart Gorrell.
- "Gettin' Some" contains a sample from "Blowjob Betty" as recorded by Too Short, written by Todd Shaw, Ramon Gooden, and Stuart Jordan.
- "Come See Me" contains a sample of "Aaja Sajan Aaja" as performed by Alka Yagnik, written by Anand Bakshi and Laxmikant–Pyarelal.
- "I'll Be Around" contains samples from "Send My Lover Back" as recorded by Black Heat, written by Phil Guilbeau.
- "Two Miles an Hour (Remix)" contains samples from "Little Child Runnin' Wild", written and recorded by Curtis Mayfield.
- "You Ain't Got Enough" contains samples from "If We Don't Make It, Nobody Can" as recorded by Tom Brock, written by Tom Brock, Barry White and Robert Relf.
- "Family Affair" contains excerpts from "Please Don't Leave Me Lonely", written and performed by King Floyd.

== Charts ==
=== Weekly charts ===
Chart (2005)	Peak position
US Billboard 200	11
US Top R&B/Hip-Hop Albums (Billboard)	1
US Top Rap Albums (Billboard)	1

=== Year-end charts ===
Chart (2006)	Position
US Billboard 200	105
US Top R&B/Hip-Hop Albums (Billboard)	35

== Certifications ==
Region	Certification	Certified units/sales
United States (RIAA)	Gold	500,000^{^}
^{^} Shipments figures based on certification alone.
