= Bobby Sandimanie =

Bobby Sandimanie may refer to:

- I-20 (rapper) (born 1975), American rapper and father of Destroy Lonely
- Destroy Lonely (born 2001), American rapper and son of I-20
