= Delisha Thomas =

Trinidadian singer-songwriter

- Born: Trinidad
- Origin: Mississauga, Ontario, Canada
- Genres: R&B; soul; gospel; hip-hop
- Occupation: Singer-songwriter

Delisha Thomas is a Trinidadian singer-songwriter, best known for her work with producer Rodney "Darkchild" Jerkins. She has written for Beyoncé, Janet Jackson, and Justin Bieber, among others. Thomas is a member of the Canadian Academy of Vocal Music Hall of Fame.

== Songwriting and production credits ==
Credits are courtesy of Discogs, Tidal, Apple Music, and AllMusic.

Title	Year	Artist	Album
"You Don't Know"	2004	Kierra Sheard	I Owe You
"Get Loose"	2004	Christina Milian	It's About Time
"Step Into My World"	2005	Jennifer Lopez	Rebirth
"I Got U"	2005	Jennifer Lopez	Rebirth
"The Way I Love You"	2006	Tamia	Between Friends
"Cry No More"	2006	Shareefa	Point of No Return
"Need a Boss" (Featuring Ludacris)	2006	Shareefa	Point of No Return
"Déjà Vu (Featuring Jay-Z)	2006	Beyoncé	B'Day
"Back Up"	2006	Beyoncé	B'Day
"This Is Me"	2006	Kierra Sheard	This Is Me
"Hold Me Down"	2006	Danity Kane	Danity Kane
"Follow Me"	2006	Virtue	Testimony
"Walking Miracle"	2007	Vanessa Bell Armstrong	Walking Miracle
"Fall In Love Again"	2007	Vanessa Bell Armstrong	Walking Miracle
"Watch Me"	2007	Vanessa Bell Armstrong	Walking Miracle
"Til The Victory's Won"	2007	Vanessa Bell Armstrong	Walking Miracle
"Truth or Dare"	2008	Janet Jackson	Discipline
"The Meaning"	2008	Janet Jackson	Discipline
"Clockwork" (Unreleased)	2008	Toni Braxton	Pulse
"Crazy"	2008	Mikey Bustos	Memoirs Of A Superhero
"Favorite Girl"	2009	Justin Bieber	My World (EP)
"Jen tak" (Going Going Gone)	2009	Ewa Farna	Virtuální
"Boyfriend" (Featuring Michael Africk)	2010	Mai Kuraki	Future Kiss
"Going Going Gone"	2011	Kimberly Caldwell	Without Regret
"Evolve"	2011	Mya	K.I.S.S. (Keep It Sexy & Simple)

== Awards and nominations ==
Year	Ceremony	Award	Result	Ref
2005	36th GMA Dove Awards	Urban Recorded Song of the Year (You Don't Know)	Won	
2007	49th Annual Grammy Awards	Best R&B Song (Déjà Vu)	Nominated	
