= So What (Field Mob song) =

Single by Field Mob featuring Ciara

from the album Light Poles and Pine Trees
- Released: April 2, 2006
- Recorded: 2005
- Genre: Electro hop; R&B
- Length: 3:43
- Label: Disturbing tha Peace; Geffen
- Songwriters: D. Crawford; K. Johnson; S. Johnson; Z. Wallace; C. Williams
- Producer: Jazze Pha

Field Mob singles chronology
"Georgia" (2005)	"So What" (2006)	"Bend Over" (2006)

Ciara singles chronology
"And I" (2005)	"So What" (2006)	"Get Up" (2006)

"So What" is the first single from Field Mob's third and final album, Light Poles and Pine Trees, featuring multi-platinum recording artist Ciara, who performs the chorus and the bridge. The single peaked at #10 on the Billboard Hot 100 chart making it Field Mob's first Top 10 single and Ciara's sixth.

The first two lines from the first verse (I'm a slut, I'm a hoe, I'm a freak, I got a different girl everyday of the week) are taken from the chorus rapped by The Notorious B.I.G. from Lil' Kim's 1997 single "Crush on You."

The single debuted on the Billboard Hot 100 at #88 on April 22, 2006, and peaked at #10 on July 15, 2006.

== Music video ==
At the beginning of the music video Jazze Pha is standing in front of a car giving the introduction. The shot then switches over to Ciara who is reclining on a banister of a house, and sings the chorus. Smoke's girlfriend confront him about all of the horrible things she's heard about him. Smoke tries convince her that it's all a lie in his rap, but eventually she went back to her friends.

The shot changes to Ciara, who is shopping for clothes at a mini mall and see two "haters" gossiping about Shawn Jay. Shawn Jay's girlfriend is in a dressing room and overhears all of this nonsense. Soon as the chorus stats playing towards the end she quickly pulls the curtains away and stares at the two "haters". She then confronts Shawn Jay about what the two "haters" were talking about. He denies it all through his rap, but she eventually left the store.

Then there comes a shot with Ciara singing the chorus in an urban neighborhood setting. Jazze Pha then comes in to introduce Ciara's part in the bridge. She sings and dances to it, and while doing that both Smoke and Shawn Jay's girlfriends come to the basketball game in which they are watching. They make up, and hug each other, and Smoke and Shawn Jay had gotten them both a gift: a puppy and a necklace. The song then fades out and we see a shot of Smoke and Shawn Jay dancing in the same urban neighborhood setting that Ciara was singing in at the beginning of the video.

== Charts ==
=== Weekly charts ===
Chart (2006)	Peak position
Australia (ARIA)	40
Australian Urban (ARIA)	10
Canada CHR/Pop Top 40 (Radio & Records)	19
Canada CHR/Top 40 (Billboard)	21
UK Singles (Official Charts)	56
UK Hip Hop/R&B (Official Charts)	11
US Billboard Hot 100	10
US Hot R&B/Hip-Hop Songs (Billboard)	4
US Hot Rap Songs (Billboard)	3
US Pop Airplay (Billboard)	15
US Rhythmic (Billboard)	1

=== Year-end charts ===
Chart (2006)	Position
US Billboard Hot 100	55
US Hot R&B/Hip-Hop Songs (Billboard)	20
US Rhythmic (Billboard)	13

== Certifications ==
Certifications
Region	Certification	Certified units/sales
New Zealand (RMNZ)	Gold	15,000^{‡}
^{‡} Sales+streaming figures based on certification alone.

== Release history ==
Release dates and formats for "So What"
Region	Date	Format	Label(s)	Ref.
United States	May 8, 2006	Mainstream airplay	Disturbing Tha Peace; Geffen	
