= Move Bitch =

Single by Ludacris featuring Mystikal and I-20

from the album Word of Mouf and Golden Grain
- Released: May 21, 2002
- Recorded: 2001
- Genre: Crunk
- Length: 4:30 (album version); 3:51 (video edit)
- Label: Disturbing tha Peace; Def Jam South
- Songwriters: Jonathan Smith; Michael Tyler; Bobby Sandimanie; Craig Lawson
- Producer: KLC

Ludacris singles chronology
| "Welcome to Atlanta" (2002) | "Move Bitch" (2002) | "B R Right" (2002) |

Mystikal singles chronology
| "Tarantula" (2002) | "Move Bitch" (2002) | "Oochie Pop" (2004) |

I-20 singles chronology
| "Move Bitch" (2002) | "Fightin' in the Club" (2004) |

Music video
- "Ludacris - Move B***H (Official Music Video) ft. Mystikal, I-20" on YouTube

"Move Bitch" marketed and censored as "Move B***h" or simply "Move" is the fourth official single from American rapper Ludacris' album Word of Mouf. The single features American rappers Mystikal and I-20. The single reached number 10 on the Billboard Hot 100, making it Ludacris's first top-ten hit on the chart. It also reached number 3 on the Hot Rap Tracks chart and number 3 on the Hot R&B/Hip-Hop Singles & Tracks chart. Also, it featured in an episode of the TV series Castle. Retired NBA star and now ESPN analyst Jalen Rose is featured in the music video.

== Legacy ==
The song has been covered by rock band Start Trouble, on their album Every Solution Has Its Problem. It was sampled by Girl Talk on the first track of his album All Day, "Oh No". Puerto Rican reggaeton duo Maicol & Manuel sampled the song on "Hoy Me Levanté" on their 2002 release Yakaleo. German Hip Hop group 257ers has sampled the song on Aus Dem Weg of the album Boomshakkalakka.

The song was referenced in chants by people protesting U.S. President George W. Bush, who changed the words to “Move, Bush, get out the way!” starting with protests of the 2003 Iraq War.

== Charts ==
=== Weekly charts ===
| Chart (2002) | Peak position |
|---|---|
| US Billboard Hot 100 | 10 |
| US Hot R&B/Hip-Hop Songs (Billboard) | 3 |
| US Hot Rap Songs (Billboard) | 3 |
| US Rhythmic Airplay (Billboard) | 10 |

=== Year-end charts ===
| Chart (2002) | Position |
|---|---|
| US Billboard Hot 100 | 55 |
| US Hot R&B/Hip-Hop Songs (Billboard) | 16 |
