= Dedication 2 =

Mixtape by Lil Wayne
- Released: May 22, 2006
- Genre: Hip-hop
- Length: 81:07
- Labels: Cash Money; The Aphilliates
- Producers: Hannon Lane; Jamall "Pimpin" Wingham; Maurice "Parlae" Gleaton; Don Cannon; Infamous; DJ Green Lantern; Clayton Haraba; Swizz Beatz; Organized Noize; 9th Wonder; Kanye West; DJ Paul; Juicy J; DJ Toomp; The Runners; Xcel; Pimp C; N.O. Joe; Just Blaze; Vudu Spellz; Daz Dillinger
- Compiler: DJ Drama

Lil Wayne chronology
Tha Carter II (2005)	Dedication 2 (2006)	Like Father, Like Son (2006)

Back cover

Professional ratings
Review scores
Source	Rating
AllMusic	link
Pitchfork	(8.1/10)
RapReviews	(8/10) link
Rhapsody	(favorable) link
Robert Christgau	link
Slate	(favorable)
Stylus	B link
Village Voice	(favorable)
Washington Post	(favorable)
XXL	4/5 stars

Dedication 2 is the sixth mixtape by Lil Wayne, hosted by DJ Drama. It is a sequel to Lil Wayne's previous mixtape, The Dedication, and is second in DJ Drama's Gangsta Grillz series with Lil Wayne. It is one of the few mixtapes in the hip-hop genre to be both financially successful and critically acclaimed. Despite its illegal use of unlicensed instrumentals and samples, it was sold through iTunes and retail stores such as Best Buy and FYE, was widely reviewed in the mainstream media, and peaked at #69 on Billboard's "Top R&B/Hip-Hop Albums” chart. The cover shows Lil Wayne with "Fear God" tattooed on his eyelids. Much of the mixtape showcases Lil Wayne's free associating rhymes and "liquid non-sequiturs."

== Critical reception ==
Dedication 2 became a highly acclaimed mixtape by appearing on the year-end top ten lists from the New Yorker critic Sasha Frere-Jones, The New York Times critic Kelefa Sanneh, the Baltimore City Paper's Jason Torres, and appearing on a panel of critics at the Washington City Paper. Tom Breihan of The Village Voice proclaimed it the best summer album of 2006, praising DJ Drama's "impeccable beat selection". "SportsCenter" was complimented for its "free associating brain bursts." The track titled "Georgia... Bush" was also acclaimed for its "mesmerizing indictment" of President Bush. In 2009, Rhapsody ranked this album at number 15 on its "100 Best Albums of the Decade" list.

== Track listing ==
- All tracks were arranged by DJ Drama.

#	Title	Length	Producer(s)	Featured guest(s)	Sample(s)
1	"The Best in the Business"	0:41			
2	"Get 'Em"	3:20	Hannon Lane		"Get From Round Me" by The Diplomats
3	"They Still Like Me"	2:18	Jamall Willingham; Maurice Gleaton		"Oh, I Think They Like Me" by Dem Franchize Boyz
4	"I'm the Best Rapper Alive"	1:16			"Bang Bang" by Young Buck; "Ground Zero" by The Diplomats
5	"Cannon (AMG Remix)"	6:15	Don Cannon	DJ Drama; Freeway; Willie the Kid; Detroit Red & Juice	"Bankstaz" by Sunz of Man; "Cannon" by DJ Drama featuring T.I. & Busta Rhymes
6	"Workin Em"	3:12	DJ Infamous		
7	"SportsCenter"	2:49	DJ Green Lantern		"The Game Iz Mine" by Jay-Z
8	"Welcome To Tha Concrete Jungle"	2:29	Clayton Haraba	Juelz Santana	
9	"Spitter"	3:15	Swizz Beatz		"Spit Your Game" by The Notorious B.I.G.
10	"South Muzik"	3:16	Organized Noize		"Player's Ball (Reprise)" by Outkast
11	"This What I Call Her"	2:44	9th Wonder		"Lovin' It" by Little Brother
12	"Dedication 2"	2:43	Kanye West; Spike N' Jamahl		"Bang Bang" by Nancy Sinatra; "Ground Zero" by The Diplomats
13	"Weezy on Retirement"	0:42			
14	"Poppin them Bottles"	4:33	DJ Paul; Juicy J	Currensy; Mack Maine	"Poppin' My Collar" by Three 6 Mafia
15	"What You Know (Remix)"	4:09	DJ Toomp	T.I.	"What You Know" by T.I.
16	"Where da Cash At"	4:24	The Runners	Currensy; Remy Ma	"Fireman" by Lil Wayne
17	"Ridin wit the AK"	4:17	The Beat Bullies; Clayton Haraba	Currensy; Mack Maine	"Kryptonite (I'm on It)" by Purple Ribbon All-Stars
18	"Weezy on the Streetz of N.O."	0:26			
19	"Walk It Off"	5:40			"Don't U Be Greedy" by U.N.L.V.
20	"Hustlin"	4:00	The Runners		"Hustlin'" by Rick Ross
21	"Gettin Some Head"	3:47	Xcel	Pharrell	"Gettin' Some" by Shawnna
22	"A Dedication After Disaster"	0:48			
23	"No Other"	5:27	Pimp C; N.O. Joe; Just Blaze	Juelz Santana	"Murder" by UGK; "Intro" by Jay-Z; "Guess Who's Back Intro" by Chamillionaire
24	"Outta Here"	0:53			
25	"Georgia... Bush"	7:27	Vudu Spellz		"Georgia" by Field Mob & Ludacris featuring Jamie Foxx
25	"Weezy's Ambitionz" (Hidden Track)	7:27	Daz Dillinger		"Ambitionz az a Ridah" by 2Pac

== Charts ==
Chart (2007)	Peak position
US Independent Albums (Billboard)	30
US R&B/Hip-Hop Albums (Billboard)	69
