= Cry No More (Shareefa song) =

Single by Shareefa

from the album Point of No Return
- Released: November 1, 2006
- Recorded: 2006
- Genre: Hip hop
- Label: DTP, Def Jam
- Songwriters: Birchett, A./Creatore, L./Daniels, L./Jerkins, R./Peretti, H./Thomas, D./Weiss, G.
- Producer: Darkchild

Shareefa singles chronology
"Need a Boss" (2006)	"Cry No More" (2006)	"On Fire" (2008)

"Cry No More" is a hip hop song by hip hop artist Shareefa. It is the second and final single from her debut album, Point of No Return. The single was produced by Darkchild and samples The Stylistics' "The Miracle", and contains an interpolation of "Soul Survivor" by Young Jeezy and Akon. It was released in November 2006. The video for this single premiered on BET's Access Granted on November 1, 2006. The video features Young Buck.

== Song information ==
"Cry No More" is about a woman in an unhealthy relationship. Her man cheats on her and she always cries. In the song, she sings that she can't cry anymore because she is over and through with her ex-boyfriend. Because she has a lot on her mind, she has no time to cry over him.

== Charts ==
Chart (2006)	Peak Position
U.S. Billboard Hot R&B/Hip-Hop Songs	43
