= Golden Grain =

Ludacris Presents Disturbing tha Peace: Golden Grain

Compilation album by Various Artists
- Released: September 10, 2002
- Genre: Hip hop
- Length: 64:34
- Label: Disturbing tha Peace; Ebony Son; Def Jam South
- Producer: Chaka Zulu (exec.); Ludacris (exec.); Bangladesh; Craig Love; Derrick Williams; Digga; DJ Nasty & LVM; Jook; Michael Antonio "Icedrake" Guy; Mixzo; P. King "The Specialist"; KLC

Various Artists chronology
Ludacris Presents Disturbing tha Peace: Golden Grain (2002)	Disturbing tha Peace (2005)

Singles from Golden Grain
- 1. "Growing Pains (Do It Again)" Released: July 23, 2002; 2. "N.S.E.W." Released: 2002

Professional ratings
Review scores
Source	Rating
AllMusic	3/5 stars
RapReviews	5/10

Golden Grain is a compilation album by American record label Disturbing tha Peace. It was released on September 10, 2002 via Def Jam South.

It debuted on the US top 200 selling 95,000 in the first week. The album had only one single produced, the remix of Ludacris' song, "Growing Pains", from his Word of Mouf album. The single achieved limited airplay, reaching #61 on U.S. R&B.

== Track listing ==
No.	Title	Writer(s)	Producer(s)	Length
1.	"Break Sumthin'" (performed by Ludacris, Shawnna, Lil' Fate, Tity Boi and I-20)	Christopher Bridges; Rashawnna Guy; Arbie Wilson; Tauheed Epps; Bobby Sandimanie; Michael Johnson	Mixzo	4:37
2.	"Growing Pains (Do It Again) [Remix]" (performed by Lil' Fate, Shawnna, Ludacris, Scarface and Keon Bryce)	Bridges; R. Guy; Wilson; Keon Bryce; Peter Francis; William Bell; Curtis Mayfield	P. King "The Specialist"	4:51
3.	"Posted" (performed by Shawnna)	R. Guy; Michael Antonio Guy	Michael Antonio "Icedrake" Guy	4:18
4.	"Smokin' Dro" (performed by Tity Boi, I-20 and Ludacris)	Bridges; Wilson; Epps; Lenny Mollings; Johnny Mollings; Ed Greene	DJ Nasty & LVM	4:17
5.	"Big Chain Records" (Skit)		I-20; James "Choir Boy" Bennett	2:26
6.	"Pimp Council" (performed by Ludacris, Too $hort, Shawnna and Lil' Fate)	Bridges; R. Guy; Wilson; Todd Shaw; Craig Love	Craig Love	5:13
7.	"Play Pen to the State Pen" (performed by Playaz Circle)	Epps; Earl Conyers; Torey Cook; Andre Young; Andrew Noland; Charles Carter; Eric Wright; Gregory A. Webster; O'Shea Jackson; Walter Morrison; Leroy Bonner; Lorenzo Patterson; Marshall Jones; Marvin Pierce; Norman Bruce Napier; Ralph Middlebrooks; Roger Parker; Steve Arrington; Suzanne Vega; William DeVaughn; Wuang Hankerson	Jook	4:39
8.	"R.P.M." (performed by Ludacris, Twista and Shawnna)	Bridges; R. Guy; Carl Terrell Mitchell; Shondrae Crawford	Bangladesh	4:35
9.	"Can't Be Stopped (I Know)" (performed by I-20)	Sandimanie; Darrell Branch; Ernest Gold	Digga	3:16
10.	"Behind the Chain" (Skit)		I-20; James "Choir Boy" Bennett	2:20
11.	"A-Town Hatz" (performed by I-20, Lil' Fate, Tity Boi and Chimere)	Wilson; Epps; Sandimanie; Derrick Williams	Derrick Williams	4:48
12.	"N.S.E.W." (performed by Shawnna, Lil' Fate, Tity Boi and I-20)	R. Guy; Wilson; Epps; Sandimanie; Cook	Jook	4:53
13.	"When I Touch Down" (performed by Lil' Fate and Jazze Pha)	Wilson; Williams	Derrick Williams	5:06
14.	"Outro on Ya Ass" (performed by I-20, Tity Boy, Lil' Fate and Ludacris)	Bridges; Wilson; Epps; Sandimanie; Johnson	Mixzo	4:43
15.	"Move Bitch (Bonus track)" (performed by Ludacris, Mystikal and I-20)	Bridges; Sandimanie; Michael Lawrence Tyler; Craig S. Lawson	KLC	4:32
Total length:				1:04:34

== Charts ==
=== Weekly charts ===
Chart (2002)	Peak position
US Billboard 200	6
US Top R&B/Hip-Hop Albums (Billboard)	1

=== Year-end charts ===
Year-end chart performance for Golden Grain
Chart (2002)	Position
Canadian R&B Albums (Nielsen SoundScan)	139
Canadian Rap Albums (Nielsen SoundScan)	71
US Top R&B/Hip-Hop Albums (Billboard)	82
