= Georgia (Field Mob and Ludacris song) =

Single by Field Mob & Ludacris featuring Jamie Foxx

from the album Light Poles and Pine Trees & Ludacris Presents: Disturbing tha Peace
- B-side: "Gettin' Some" (Shawnna)
- Released: October 9, 2005
- Recorded: 2005
- Genre: Hip hop, Southern hip hop
- Length: 4:23
- Label: Disturbing tha Peace, Geffen, Def Jam
- Songwriters: Ludacris, Field Mob, Hoagy Carmichael, Stuart Gorrell
- Producer: Vudu Spellz

Field Mob singles chronology
"Friday Night" (2005)	"Georgia" (2005)	"So What" (2006)

Ludacris singles chronology
"Pimpin' All Over the World" (2005)	"Georgia" (2005)	"Unpredictable" (2005)

Jamie Foxx singles chronology
"Extravaganza" (2005)	"Georgia" (2005)	"Unpredictable" (2005)

"Georgia" is a single by Southern hip hop duo Field Mob and Atlanta-based rapper Ludacris featuring R&B singer and actor Jamie Foxx, with production by DJ Vudu Spellz. It first appeared on Ludacris Presents: Disturbing tha Peace, a compilation album released by Ludacris' own Disturbing tha Peace record label, showcasing the company's new talent as of 2006. The track was reprised on the Field Mob album Light Poles and Pine Trees released later the same year.

In the original radio version of the song, the background chorus was a sampling of Ray Charles' "Georgia On My Mind". Appropriately, because he portrayed him in the film Ray, Jamie Foxx performed Charles' parts on the version that appeared on the subsequent albums and video. However, despite being featured in the chorus, Foxx was absent from the music video.

"Georgia" reached #39 on US Hot 100 and #31 on the US R&B/Hip-Hop chart.

A remix by Lil Wayne with lyrics focusing on the Hurricane Katrina disaster appeared on his mixtape Dedication 2.

== Track listing ==
1. "Georgia" (Clean version)
2. "Georgia" (A capella)
3. "Gettin' Some" (Clean version)
4. "Gettin' Some" (Main version)
5. "Gettin' Some" (Instrumental)

== Charts ==
Chart (2005)	Peak position
U.S. Billboard Hot 100	39
U.S. Billboard Hot R&B/Hip-Hop Songs	31
U.S. Billboard Hot Rap Tracks	21
U.S. Billboard Pop 100	36

== Certifications ==
Region	Certification	Certified units/sales
United States (RIAA)	Gold	500,000^{^}
^{^} Shipments figures based on certification alone.
