= Point of No Return (Shareefa album) =

Studio album by Shareefa
- Released: October 24, 2006
- Recorded: 2005–06
- Genres: R&B; hip hop
- Length: 53:25
- Labels: Disturbing tha Peace; Def Jam South
- Producers: Chaka Zulu (exec.); Jeff Dixon (exec.); Ludacris (exec.); Adida; Chucky Thompson; Rodney "Darkchild" Jerkins; J.U.S.T.I.C.E. League; KQ; Needlz; Rich Nice; Salaam Remi; Ski Beatz

Singles from Point of No Return
- 1. "Need a Boss" Released: 2006

Professional ratings
Review scores
Source	Rating
About.com	3/5 stars
AllMusic	3.5/5 stars
Stylus	B−

Point of No Return is the first and only studio album by American singer Shareefa. It was released on October 24, 2006 on Disturbing tha Peace and Def Jam South. Production was handled by Chucky Thompson, Rodney Jerkins, J.U.S.T.I.C.E. League, Rich Nice, Needlz, Salaam Remi, Ski Beatz, Adida and KQ. It features guest appearances from Ludacris and Bobby V. The album debuted at #25 on the Billboard 200 with nearly 37,000 copies sold in its first week. Its lead single "Need a Boss" peaked at number 62 on the Billboard Hot 100.

== Track listing ==
No.	Title	Writer(s)	Producer(s)	Length
1.	"The Start"	Carl Thompson; Richard Jackson	Chucky Thompson; Rich Nice	1:03
2.	"Cry No More"	Rodney Jerkins; Anesha Birchett; Delisha Thomas; LaShawn Daniels; George David Weiss; Hugo Peretti; Luigi Creatore	Darkchild	3:27
3.	"U Told Me"	Erik Ortiz; Kevin Crowe; Charles Goodrum; Jay Graydon; Clifford Lee Brown III; S. Jordan, Jr.	J.U.S.T.I.C.E. League	4:20
4.	"Need a Boss" (featuring Ludacris)	Christopher Bridges; Jerkins; Birchett; Thomas; Daniels; Weiss; Peretti; Creatore	Darkchild	3:51
5.	"No One Said Prelude" (Skit)	Jackson	Rich Nice	1:08
6.	"No One Said"	Shareefa Cooper; Thompson; Harvey Mason	Chucky Thompson	3:12
7.	"Butterfly"	Ortiz; Crowe; Brown III; Barry Eugene Carter; Tom James Brocker; Robert Taylor; K. Johnson	J.U.S.T.I.C.E. League	4:09
8.	"How Good Luv Feels"	Cooper; Salaam Remi Gibbs; Ryan Toby; R. Jackson	Salaam Remi	4:23
9.	"Phony"	Cooper; Adida; KQ; Maurice White; Clarence Scarborough	Adida; KQ	3:59
10.	"Assumptions"	Cooper; David Willis; K. Johnson; Sam Dees	Ski Beatz	3:40
11.	"Hey Babe (Give Me Ya Good Lovin')" (featuring Bobby Valentino)	Cooper; Bobby Wilson; Khari Cain; Ralph Bass; Lowman Pauling	Needlz	4:20
12.	"Eye Wonder"	Cooper; Thompson	Chucky Thompson	4:49
13.	"Trippin'"	Cooper; Thompson; K. Johnson; William Collins; George Clinton; Gary Cooper; Garry Shider	Chucky Thompson	4:18
14.	"Fevah (He Don't Know)"	Cooper; Thompson; Kenneth Hairston	Chucky Thompson	3:45
15.	"The End"	Cooper; Thompson	Chucky Thompson	2:55
Total length:				53:25

Japan bonus track
No.	Title	Writer(s)	Producer(s)	Length
16.	"I’ll Be Around"	Cooper; Toby; Remi Gibbs; Phil Guilbeau	Remi	3:54

Sample credits

- "Cry No More" contains samples of "The Miracle" by The Stylistics.
- "U Told Me" contains an interpolation of "Haunting Me" by Dave Grusin.
- "Need a Boss" contains samples of "Let's Put It All Together" by The Stylistics.
- "Butterfly" contains samples of "Mellow Mood (Part 1)" by Barry White.
- "Phony" contains samples of "Earth, Wind and Fire" by Earth, Wind & Fire.
- "Assumptions" contains samples of "Win or Lose" by Windy City.
- "Hey Babe" contains an interpolation of "Dedicated to the One I Love" by The Shirelles.
- "Trippin'" contains samples of "Munchies for Your Love" by Bootsy Collins.
- "Fevah (He Don't Know)" contains samples of "Hangin Downtown" by Cameo.

== Charts ==
Chart (2006)	Peak position
US Billboard 200	25
US Top R&B/Hip-Hop Albums (Billboard)	3
