= Nasty Girl (Ludacris song) =

Single by Ludacris featuring Plies

from the album Theater of the Mind
- Released: January 20, 2009
- Genre: Hip hop
- Length: 4:32
- Label: DTP, Def Jam
- Songwriters: C. Bridges, A. Washington, K. Dean
- Producer: Swizz Beatz

Ludacris singles chronology
"Creepin' (Solo)" (2008)	"Nasty Girl" (2009)	"How Do You Sleep?" (2009)

Plies singles chronology
"Want It, Need It" (2009)	"Nasty Girl" (2009)	"Plenty Money" (2009)

"Nasty Girl" is a song by American rapper Ludacris, released as the third single from his sixth studio album, Theater of the Mind. The song features fellow southern hip hop artist Plies and was produced by musician Swizz Beatz. The song was released to radio on January 20, 2009.

== Music video ==
A music video was shot for "Nasty Girl". Just like the music videos for the first two singles this one is directed by Chris Robinson. A "behind-the-scenes" video was shot to prepare for the release of the music video. The video premiered on the Def Jam website February 10, 2009. DRANK, the world's first hip hop relaxation beverage, which has found its way into several rap videos throughout the last six months is featured in the video. It also appeared as the New Joint of the Day on 106 & Park February 11, 2009.

== Chart positions ==
Chart (2009)	Peak Position
US Hot R&B/Hip-Hop Songs (Billboard)	54
US Hot Rap Songs (Billboard)	23
