= Grew Up a Screw Up =

Single by Ludacris featuring Young Jeezy

from the album Release Therapy
- Released: October 31, 2006
- Recorded: 2006
- Genre: Gangsta rap
- Length: 4:00
- Label: DTP, Def Jam
- Songwriters: Christopher Bridges, Christopher Wallace, Edgar Winter, Osten Harvey, Jr., Jay Jenkins, Johnny Mollings, Leonardo Mollings, Luis Resto, Marshall Mathers, Tupac Shakur
- Producer: DJ Nasty & LVM

Ludacris singles chronology
"Need a Boss" (2006)	"Grew Up a Screw Up" (2006)	"Glamorous" (2007)

Young Jeezy singles chronology
"Say I" (2006)	"Grew Up a Screw Up" (2006)	"I Luv It" (2006)

"Grew Up A Screw Up" is a song by American rapper Ludacris, released by Def Jam Recordings and Disturbing tha Peace on October 31, 2006 as the second single from his fifth album, Release Therapy (2006). The song features Young Jeezy, while production was handled by DJ Nasty & LVM. Its hook samples Tupac Shakur and the Notorious B.I.G.'s posthumous 2003 single "Runnin' (Dying to Live)". Two versions of the song exist, both identical beyond featuring alternate verses from Jeezy—one is heard on the album, while the other is heard in the song's music video.

== Music video ==
The video premiered on BET's 106 & Park as a New Joint on Friday October 13, 2006.

== Remix ==
The official remix is the video version with an alternate Young Jeezy verse. Rappers Lil Wayne, 2 Chainz, and Brisco freestyled over the beat on Wayne's mixtape Lil Weezy Ana Vol. 1.

== Credits and personnel ==
The credits for "Grew Up a Screw Up" are adapted from the liner notes of Release Therapy.

Recording

- Recorded at: The Ludaplex and Thug Mansion Studios, both in Atlanta, Georgia and Nasty's Crib in Orlando, Florida.

Personnel

- Ludacris – vocals, songwriting
- DJ Nasty & LVM – producers
- Young Jeezy – vocals, songwriting
- Johnny Mollings – songwriting
- Lenny Mollings – songwriting, recording, guitar
- Joshua Monroy – recording
- Tony Rey – recording
- Phil Tan – mixing
- Josh Houghkirk – additional engineering
- Osten Harvey, Jr. – songwriting
- Marshall Mathers – songwriting
- Luis Edgardo Resto – songwriting
- Tupac Shakur – songwriting
- Chris Wallace – songwriting
- Edgar Winter – songwriting
- Bernie Grundman – mastering

Samples

- Contains elements of "Runnin' (Dying to Live)", performed by The Notorious B.I.G. and 2Pac and written by Osten Harvey, Jr., Marshall Mathers, Luis Edgardo Resto, Tupac Shakur, Chris Wallace and Edgar Winter.

== Charts ==
Chart (2006)	Peak Position
US Hot R&B/Hip-Hop Songs (Billboard)	60
