= Self Explanatory (I-20 album) =

Studio album by I-20
- Released: October 5, 2004
- Recorded: 2000–2004
- Genre: Southern hip hop
- Length: 58:51
- Label: Disturbing tha Peace; Capitol
- Producer: Chaka Zulu (exec.); Ludacris (exec.); Craig Love; DJ Paul; Groove Junkees; Hotrunner; Jayson Dyer; Joe Traxx; Juicy J; Lil Jon; Red Spyda; Salaam Remi; Ski; The Heatmakerz

Singles from Self Explanatory
- 1. "Break Bread" Released: July 13, 2004

Professional ratings
Review scores
Source	Rating
AllMusic	3/5 stars
RapReviews	7/10

Self Explanatory is the only studio album by American rapper I-20. It was released on October 5, 2004 via Disturbing tha Peace and Capitol. Production was handled by Salaam Remi, Groove Junkeys, the Heatmakerz, Craig Love, DJ Paul, Hot Runner, Joe Traxx, Juicy J, Lil Jon, Red Spyda and Ski. It features guest appearances from Butch Cassidy, Ludacris, 2 Chainz, Bone Crusher, Chingy, Devin the Dude, Juvenile, Lil' Fate, Shawnna and Three 6 Mafia. The album peaked at number 42 on the U.S. Billboard 200 and at #5 on the Top R&B/Hip-Hop Albums chart.

Its lead single "Break Bread" was released on July 13, 2004. Two songs from the album, "Fightin' in the Club" and "Hennessey & Hydro" were released as promotional singles in 2003 and 2004 respectively.

== Track listing ==
No.	Title	Writer(s)	Producer(s)	Length
1.	"Eyes Open" (Intro)	Bobby Sandimanie; Gregory Green; Sean Thomas	The Heatmakerz	1:46
2.	"Meet the Dealer" (featuring Ludacris)	Sandimanie; Christopher Bridges; Green; Thomas	The Heatmakerz	3:40
3.	"Fightin' in the Club" (featuring Lil Fate, Tity Boi and Chingy)	Sandimanie; Arbie Wilson; Tauheed Epps; Howard Bailey; Salaam Gibbs	Salaam Remi; Jayson Dyer	3:54
4.	"The Realist"	Sandimanie; Gibbs; Norman Whitfield	Salaam Remi	3:53
5.	"Backstage" (featuring Butch Cassidy)	Sandimanie; Danny Means; Richard Jackson; Louis Tineo; David Anthony	Groove Junkeys	3:37
6.	"Break Bread" (featuring Ludacris and Bone Crusher)	Sandimanie; Bridges; Jonathan Smith	Lil' Jon	4:37
7.	"May Sound Crazy"	Sandimanie; David Willis; Anthony Hester	Ski	3:43
8.	"Hennessey & Hydro" (featuring Three 6 Mafia)	Sandimanie; Jordan Houston; Paul Beauregard; Gene McFadden; Jerry Cohen; John Whitehead	DJ Paul; Juicy J	3:47
9.	"Point 'Em Out" (featuring Juvenile)	Sandimanie; Gibbs; Joseph Simmons; Darryl McDaniels; Lawrence Smith	Salaam Remi	3:47
10.	"So Decatur"	Sandimanie; Joseph Howard; Jackson	Joe Traxx	4:00
11.	"OG Anthem" (featuring Butch Cassidy)	Sandimanie; Means; Andy Thelusma	Red Spyda	5:27
12.	"Slow Fuckin'" (featuring Shawnna)	Sandimanie; Rashawnna Guy; Craig Love	Craig Love	5:43
13.	"Kisha"	Sandimanie; Anthony; Jackson; Ewanya "Puff" Johnson	Groove Junkeys	4:36
14.	"Hey Shawty" (featuring Devin the Dude)	Sandimanie; Devin Copeland; Terrance Lovelace	Hot Runner	3:50
Total length:				58:51

Sample credits

- Track #4 sampled Yvonne Fair's "Let Your Hair Down"
- Track #7 sampled The Dramatics' "In the Rain"
- Track #8 sampled Teddy Pendergrass's "Let Me Love You"
- Track #9 sampled Run-DMC's "Darryl & Joe"

== Charts ==
Chart (2004)	Peak position
US Billboard 200	42
US Top R&B/Hip-Hop Albums (Billboard)	5
US Top Rap Albums (Billboard)	3
