= Disturbing tha Peace =

American record label based in Atlanta, Georgia

- Parent company: Universal Music Group
- Founded: July 9, 1998; 28 years ago
- Founder: Chaka Zulu; Jeff Dixon; Ludacris
- Distributor: Def Jam (United States) Capitol (Chingy/I-20) Mercury Records (United Kingdom)
- Genre: Hip hop, R&B
- Country of origin: United States
- Location: Atlanta, Georgia, U.S.
- Official website: dtprecords.com

Disturbing tha Peace Records (or DTP) is an American record label founded by rapper Ludacris, Ludacris' manager Chaka Zulu, and Chaka Zulu's brother Jeff Dixon in 1998.

== History ==
=== Beginnings ===
Disturbing tha Peace was founded in 1998 by Christopher "Ludacris" Bridges, manager Chaka Zulu, and Zulu's brother Jeff Dixon. The record label started as an independent label and was created to serve as an outlet for musicians hailing from the "Dirty South" especially for Ludacris who at the time failed to get a major label record deal. Incorporating all aspects of A&R Guidance, Marketing/Publicity, Promotions, Creative Sponsorship Opportunities, Touring and Performance set-up, and Long-term Artist Development.

That same year the label released Ludacris' independent album Incognegro which it sold more than 50,000 copies that Ludacris sold himself out of the trunk of his car. Also that same year the Atlanta-based rapper caught his big break when he signed to The Island Def Jam Music Group's newly established Southern rap subsidiary, Def Jam South, and became the label's flagship Dirty South artist. In late 2000 Def Jam repackaged his underground album Incognegro as Back for the First Time, adding a few new songs: a UGK collaboration ("Stick 'Em Up"), a Neptunes production ("Southern Hospitality"), and a remix of his previously released song with Timbaland (retitled "Phat Rabbit"). The album's lead single, "What's Your Fantasy" became a major hit nationally, peaking at number 21 on the Hot 100, and the follow-up single, "Southern Hospitality", was similarly popular, charting at number 23. This pair of hits helped drive sales of Back for the First Time, which climbed all the way to number four on the Billboard 200, since its release, it has been certified triple platinum with over 3 million copies sold.

=== 2001–2003 ===
In 2001 the label released Ludacris' second album Word of Mouf which was an even greater success for Ludacris, selling over 281,000 copies in its first week of sales, charting at number three and spawning a series of hit singles that carried over well into 2002: "Area Codes", "Rollout (My Business)", "Saturday (Oooh! Ooooh!)", "Welcome to Atlanta", and "Move Bitch". The album was certified 3× Platinum becoming Ludacris' bestselling album to date with sales of over 3,616,000 copies in the United States, as of July 2009.

In 2002 the label released a collaboration album Golden Grain showcasing the assembly of talent signed to Ludacris' revived Disturbing tha Peace label in which it featured Shawnna, I-20, Tity Boi, Lil Fate, DJ Jay Cee also known as DJ JHB, and Ludacris himself on the album. That same year, St. Louis, Missouri rapper Chingy was signed.

In 2003 the label released the soundtrack to the movie 2 Fast 2 Furious it spawned three hit singles "Act a Fool", "Pick Up the Phone", and Pump It Up". That same year, Chingy released his debut studio album Jackpot through Disturbing Tha Peace. The album was a commercial success, selling over 157,000 units in its first week and ultimately being certified Double Platinum in America. In late 2003 the label released Ludacris' third album Chicken-n-Beer his first to reach number one on the Billboard 200. Chicken -n- Beer brought with it another series of hits, including the Hot 100 number-one, Kanye West produced "Stand Up" and number-six "Splash Waterfalls".

=== 2004–2006 ===
In 2004, the label released Shawnna's debut album Worth tha Weight. It spawned two singles; "Shake Dat Shit" and "Weight a Minute". The album has sold 380,000 copies to date. That same year, the label released I-20's debut album. The album spawned two singles; "Fightin' in the Club" and "Break Bread". By the end of 2004, Ludacris released his fourth album The Red Light District, another number-one album loaded with hit singles "Get Back", "Number One Spot" and "Pimpin' All Over the World" which featured the label's new artist, R&B singer Bobby Valentino.

In 2005, the label released Valentino's self-titled debut album Bobby Valentino. A Billboard Top R&B/Hip-Hop Albums chart-topper, it spawned three singles; "Slow Down", "Tell Me" and "My Angel (Never Leave You)". The sultry "Slow Down" announced the singer's rebirth as a DTP member in early 2005 and soon became a BET and radio favorite as the ballad was landing on numerous schools' prom ballots. By the end of 2005, Disturbing tha Peace released their second collaboration album Ludacris Presents: Disturbing tha Peace, featuring the label's roster of talent including the label's new artists Shareefa, Field Mob, Norfclk, Lazyeye, and Small World. The album spawned two singles; "Georgia" and "Gettin' Some". The album was certified gold.

In 2006, the label released Shawnna's second album Block Music. The album immediately followed "Gettin' Some", a highlight from the second Disturbing tha Peace album. The second single was "Damn" featuring Smoke of Field Mob. The album has so far sold over 240,000 copies in the U.S., and over 260,000 copies worldwide. That same year, Field Mob released their third album and their first under the label, Light Poles and Pine Trees. It spawned one single, the Jazze Pha-produced song "So What" featuring Ciara. This has become the duo's most successful hit to date (9-07), climbing to #10 on the US Billboard Hot 100, and #3 and #4 on the US Hot Rap Tracks and US Hot R&B/Hip Hop Songs charts, respectively. The album itself achieved #1 on the US Billboard Top Rap Albums and #7 on the US Billboard 200. It has sold over 200,000 copies. The album's success has been at least partially attributed to better promotion of the group by DTP than that at their previous label, MCA Records. In late 2006, the label released Ludacris' Grammy Award-winning fifth album Release Therapy an introspective album on which he vowed that he would be taken more seriously than in the past. Another chart-topper, Release Therapy included only two Hot 100-charting singles, yet both were smashes: "Money Maker" (number one), "Runaway Love" (number two). The album debuted at #1 on the Billboard 200 album chart selling over 309,000 copies in the first week making it Ludacris' third number-one album in a row. To date, the album has sold over 1.3 million copies. In the fall of 2006, the label released Shareefa's debut album Point of No Return it spawned two singles "Need a Boss", featuring rapper labelmate Ludacris, and "Cry No More", both singles were released that same year.

=== 2007–2009 ===
In 2007 the label released Bobby Valentino's second album Special Occasion, Valentino released the album's first single titled "Turn the Page" with mixed reviews. His second single, "Anonymous" featuring Timbaland, was released on April 9, 2007. Overall, the album received positive reviews from critics and audiences. Special Occasion debuted at No. 3 on the U.S. Billboard 200, selling about 92,000 copies in its first week, just over one-half of his previous album's first-week sales. The album eventually peaked at No. 1 on the Billboard Top R&B/Hip-Hop Albums chart. Since then the album has sold approximately 270,000 copies In fall of 2007 the label released Playaz Circle's debut album Supply & Demand, their highly anticipated debut album featured the hit singles "Duffle Bag Boy" with Lil Wayne, "Betta Knock" and "U Can Believe It" with Ludacris. That same year Chingy returned to the label and released his fourth album and second with the label Hate It or Love It, the first official radio single was "Fly Like Me" featuring Amerie. The second single was announced by his Myspace and was "Gimme Dat" Feat. Ludacris and Bobby Valentino. The album debuted at #84 on the charts, selling 31,000 copies. The album failed to match the success like his first studio album, which was why Chingy was dropped from the label months after.

In early 2008 Bobby Valentino confirmed that he was no longer signed to either Def Jam or Disturbing The Peace during an interview with DJBooth.net. He stated:

The decision to leave [the label] was totally mine. I sat down with Ludacris and Chaka Zulu, and I explained to them that it was time for me to venture out on my own. They had no problem with it; they are cool with it, no beef at all.

Despite Special Occasion's gold certification, Valentino was reportedly frustrated with the album's delays and less than expected sales, culminating in his decision to leave the labels. Although business ties have been severed, Valentino maintains positive relationships with CEO Chaka Zulu, Ludacris and the DTP/Def Jam staff. Nearly the end of 2008 the label released Ludacris' sixth album Theater of the Mind, the album spawned three singles the first official single was "What Them Girls Like", "co-starring" Chris Brown & Sean Garrett. The single peaked at #33 on the Billboard Hot 100. The second official single was "One More Drink", "co-starring" T-Pain, peaking at #24 on the Billboard Hot 100. The third single was "Nasty Girl", "co-starring" Plies. Though the album was well received by music critics, it debuted at number five on the Billboard 200, selling 214,000 copies in its first week. It was his first album since 2001's Word of Mouf to not reach number-one status, and his lowest charting album since his debut. To date, the album has sold about 671,000 copies, achieving a gold certification.

In 2009 the label released Willy Northpole's debut album Tha Connect. The album's first single was "Body Marked Up" and second "#1 Side Chick" featuring Bobby Valentino. The album's first week sales were 2,896. As of October 18, 2009, the album has 7,000 record sales. The album reviews were positive for a debut album, but at the same time, it was bashed for providing few features. Ludacris was supposed to be on his album, but the track he was to collaborate on did not clear in time for the album release date. Poor sales for the album were blamed on a lack of promotion and the death of Michael Jackson two days after the release of the album. By late 2009 the label released Playaz Circle's second album Flight 360: The Takeoff. It spawned five singles "Stupid", "Hold Up", "Can't Remember", "Yeah We Gettin' Rich", and "Big Dawg". The album debuted at #74 on the Billboard 200, selling 8,000 copies. As of December 2009 the album has currently sold 31,000. That same year the label signed new talent, Rudy Currence, rap group B.X.C., rap group TK N CA$H, and Lil Scrappy who left Lil Jon's BME Recordings. Also that same year Ludacris and Shawnna confirmed that they would release a collaboration album together titled Battle of the Sexes, set for Summer 2009, but Shawnna reportedly split from the label later that year and signed to T-Pain's Nappy Boy Entertainment. Then it was later reported that Shawnna was removed from the album and became a solo album by Ludacris with guest appearances.

=== 2010–present ===
Ludacris' seventh album Battle of the Sexes was released on March 9, 2010. Originally tagged as a collaboration album by Ludacris and Shawnna, it became a solo album by Ludacris with guest appearances after Shawnna was cut from the album for unknown reasons. Despite the mixed to negative reviews surrounding the album, it debuted at #1 on the Billboard 200 upon its release making this his 4th number-one album in a row. The album has currently spawned three singles; "How Low", "My Chick Bad" and "Sex Room". On November 2, 2011, it was announced that Lil Scrappy had parted ways with the label.

In 2026, Disturbing tha Peace members Ludacris, Chingy, Shawnna, I-20 and DJ Infamous reunited in a Super Bowl commercial for Frank's RedHot.

== Roster ==
=== Artists ===
- Ludacris
- Lil Fate

=== Former ===
- I-20
- Chingy
- Bobby V
- Shawnna
- Willy Northpole
- Playaz Circle
- Tity Boi
- Lil Scrappy
- Shareefa
- Field Mob (Shawn Jay and Smoke)
- Rudy Currence
- Lazyeye
- Jarvis
- Steph Jones (Garrain Jones)
- Serius Jones
- Block XChange (Lyriq and Commando)
- TK N CASH
- Norfclk (Small World, Brolic D, Perfect Harmany)
- 4-Ize

=== Producers ===
- DJ Infamous
- Shondrae
- Ludacris
- DJ Jay Cee

== Discography ==
| Year | Information |
|---|---|
| 2000 | Ludacris – Incognegro: Released: May 16, 2000; Singles: "What's Your Fantasy" |
| 2000 | Ludacris – Back for the First Time: Released: October 17, 2000; Singles: "What's Your Fantasy", "Southern Hospitality"; RIAA certification: 3× Platinum |
| 2001 | Ludacris – Word of Mouf: Released: November 27, 2001; Singles: "Rollout (My Business)", "Saturday (Oooh Oooh!)", "Move Bitch"; RIAA certification: 4× Platinum |
| 2002 | Ludacris & Disturbing tha Peace Presents: Golden Grain: Released: September 17, 2002; Singles: "Growing Pains (Do It Again)", "N.S.E.W."; RIAA certification: Gold |
| 2003 | 2 Fast 2 Furious: The Soundtrack: Released: May 27, 2003; Singles: "Act a Fool", "Pick Up the Phone", "Pump It Up"; RIAA certification: Gold |
| 2003 | Chingy – Jackpot: Released: July 15, 2003; Singles: "Right Thurr", "Holidae In", "One Call Away"; RIAA certification: 2× Platinum |
| 2003 | Ludacris – Chicken-n-Beer: Released: October 7, 2003; Singles: "P-Poppin", "Stand Up", "Splash Waterfalls", "Diamond in the Back"; RIAA certification: 2× Platinum |
| 2004 | Shawnna – Worth tha Weight: Released: September 28, 2004; Singles: "Shake Dat Shit", "Weight a Minute"; RIAA certification: Gold |
| 2004 | I-20 – Self Explanatory: Released: October 5, 2004; Singles: "Fightin' in the Club", "Break Bread"; RIAA certification: Gold |
| 2004 | Ludacris – The Red Light District: Released: December 7, 2004; Singles: "Get Back", "Number One Spot", "The Potion", "Pimpin' All Over the World"; RIAA certification: 2× Platinum |
| 2005 | Bobby Valentino – Bobby Valentino: Released: April 26, 2005; Singles: "Slow Down", "Tell Me", "My Angel (Never Leave You)"; RIAA certification: Platinum |
| 2005 | Ludacris Presents: Disturbing tha Peace: Released: December 13, 2005; Singles: "Georgia", "Gettin' Some", "Two Miles an Hour (Remix)"; RIAA certification: Gold |
| 2006 | Shawnna – Block Music: Released: June 6, 2006; Singles: "Gettin' Some", "Damn" |
| 2006 | Field Mob – Light Poles and Pine Trees: Released: June 20, 2006; Singles: "Georgia", "So What" |
| 2006 | Ludacris – Release Therapy: Released: September 26, 2006; Singles: "Money Maker", "Grew Up a Screw Up", "Runaway Love", "Slap"; RIAA certification: Platinum |
| 2006 | Shareefa – Point of No Return: Released: October 24, 2006; Singles: "Need a Boss", "Cry No More" |
| 2007 | Bobby Valentino – Special Occasion: Released: May 8, 2007; Singles: "Turn the Page", "Anonymous"; RIAA certification: Gold |
| 2007 | Playaz Circle – Supply & Demand: Released: October 30, 2007; Singles: "Duffle Bag Boy", "Betta Knock", "U Can Believe It" |
| 2007 | Chingy – Hate It or Love It: Released: December 18, 2007; Singles: "Fly Like Me", "Gimme Dat" |
| 2008 | Ludacris – Theater of the Mind: Released: November 25, 2008; Singles: "What Them Girls Like", "One More Drink", "Nasty Girl"; RIAA certification: Gold |
| 2009 | Willy Northpole – Tha Connect: Released: June 23, 2009; Singles: "Body Marked Up", "Hood Dreamer", "#1 Side Chick" |
| 2009 | Playaz Circle – Flight 360: The Takeoff: Released: June 23, 2009; Singles: "Stupid", "Hold Up", "Can't Remember", "Yeah We Gettin' Rich", "Big Dawg" |
| 2010 | Ludacris – Battle of the Sexes: Released: March 9, 2010; Singles: "How Low", "My Chick Bad", "Sex Room"; RIAA certification: Gold |
| 2014 | Ludacris – Burning Bridges: Released: December 16, 2014; Singles: "Good Lovin'" |
| 2015 | Ludacris – Ludaversal: Released: March 31, 2015; Singles: "Good Lovin'", "Come & See Me", "Grass Is Always Greener" |
