= Need a Boss =

Single by Shareefa featuring Ludacris

from the album Point of No Return
- Released: July 25, 2006
- Recorded: 2005
- Genre: Hip hop, R&B
- Length: 3:53
- Label: DTP, Def Jam
- Songwriter(s): Anesha Birchett, Christopher Bridges, Luigi Creatore, LaShawn Daniels, Rodney Jerkins, Hugo Peretti, Delisha Thomas, George David Weiss
- Producer(s): Darkchild

Shareefa singles chronology
"Need a Boss" (2006)	"Cry No More" (2006)

Ludacris singles chronology
"Money Maker" (2006)	""Need a Boss" (2006)	"Grew Up a Screw Up" (2006)

"Need a Boss" is the debut single from singer Shareefa from her debut album Point of No Return. The single features label mate and DTP's founder Ludacris and was produced by Rodney "Darkchild" Jerkins. It samples The Stylistics "Let's Put It All Together". "Need a Boss" peaked on the Billboard Hot 100 at number 62, on the Hot R&B/Hip-Hop Singles & Tracks at number 10, and BET's 106 & Park at number 4. It had success on BET and receiving heavy airplay on the 106 & Park countdown for a long span of time and peaking in the top 5 at number 4. A cover remix was made by Ace Valentine entitled "Need A Ghetto Girl".

== Charts ==
=== Weekly charts ===
Chart (2006)	Peak position
US Billboard Hot 100	62
US Hot R&B/Hip-Hop Songs (Billboard)	10
US Rhythmic (Billboard)	24

=== Year-end charts ===
Chart (2006)	Position
US Hot R&B/Hip-Hop Songs (Billboard)	69
