= I-20 (rapper) =

American rapper

- Also known as: Infamous 2-0
- Born: Bobby Wardell Sandimanie II; July 8, 1975 (age 50)
- Origin: Decatur, Georgia, U.S.
- Genres: Southern hip-hop
- Occupations: Rapper; singer; songwriter
- Years active: 1996–present
- Labels: Disturbing tha Peace; Capitol; E1
- Children: Destroy Lonely (son)
- Website: i20music.com

Bobby Wardell Sandimanie II (born July 8, 1975), better known by his stage name I-20, is an American rapper. Noted for his deep voice and Southern drawl, he is best known for his guest appearance alongside Mystikal on fellow Southern rapper Ludacris' 2002 single, "Move Bitch", which peaked at number ten on the Billboard Hot 100.

Sandimaie signed with Ludacris' Disturbing tha Peace (DTP) label in 1999, and appeared on Ludacris' first two albums: Incognegro (1999) and Back for the First Time (2000). I-20 was also featured on the label's compilation albums Golden Grain (2002) and Ludacris Presents: Disturbing tha Peace (2005), as well as several of Ludacris' subsequent albums. His debut album, Self Explanatory (2004), was released by DTP in a joint venture with Capitol Records; it peaked at number 42 on the Billboard 200 and remains his only release by a major label. That same year, he guest performed alongside Chingy and Nate Dogg on Houston's single "I Like That", which peaked at number 11 on the Billboard Hot 100.

His original stage name was Infamous 2-0, but was later changed to tribute Interstate 20, the route which runs through the Southeastern United States.

== Personal life ==
Sandimanie's son is Bobby Wardell Sandimanie III, known professionally as Destroy Lonely.

== Discography ==
Studio albums

- 2004: Self Explanatory
- 2008: Blood in the Water

Mixtapes

- 2011: Interstate Trafficking (with DJ Noize)
- 2011: 20/20 Vision (with DJ Kurupt)
- 2011: The Grey Area (with DJ Bobby Black)
- 2012: Celebrity Rehab
- 2012: Celebrity Rehab 2
- 2013: The Amphetamine Manifesto: Part One
- 2013: The Amphetamine Manifesto: Part Two
