= Def Jam South =

American Southern hip-hop record label

- Parent company: Universal Music Group
- Founded: 2000; 26 years ago
- Founder: Lyor Cohen
- Status: Active
- Distributors: Def Jam (United States); Universal Music Group (International)
- Genre: Southern hip-hop
- Country of origin: United States
- Location: New York City, New York

Def Jam South is an American record label, conceived as a Southern Hip Hop division of Def Jam Recordings. The label focused primarily on southern acts. It was best known for launching the career of its first artist signed, Ludacris and his own imprint, Disturbing tha Peace. In 2004, following the signing of Jeezy and hip-hop's overdominance of trap music, the division was folded into Def Jam.

== Company history ==
=== History ===
In the late 1990s, hip-hop's main popularity moved from West Coast hip-hop and East Coast hip-hop to Southern hip-hop following the successes of rap labels Rap-A-Lot Records, Cash Money Records, and No Limit Records. Then president of Island Def Jam Music Group, Lyor Cohen, wanted to capitalize off of the success of southern rap. He recruited Southern rap veteran Scarface to be the head of the label and, by 2000, the label was established with a headquarters in Atlanta, Georgia. Later that year, a former Atlanta DJ named Chris Luva Luva began rapping under the moniker Ludacris and released his debut solo album, Incognegro, independently on his own record label Disturbing Tha Peace. Scarface listened to the album while visiting Atlanta and signed Ludacris and his label Disturbing Tha Peace to Def Jam South. In October 2000, Ludacris repackaged Incognegro as his commercial debut studio album, Back for the First Time. The album was a critical and commercial success, debuting and peaking in the top 5 on the Billboard 200 and selling over three million copies in America. Ludacris became one of the biggest stars in the southern hip-hop market and would lead the Def Jam South division to great heights with the releases of Word of Mouf (2001) and Chicken-N-Beer (2003). Scarface would end up releasing only one album under Def Jam South, The Fix, in August 2002, as he left the label for Rap-A-Lot Records soon after. Following this, Universal Music Group could not afford to finance the label's division anymore, due to the ongoing music piracy crisis, so Def Jam South was folded into to Def Jam in 2004, as they were in the process of signing then-newcomer Young Jeezy.

=== "Unofficial" revival (2005) ===
In the summer of 2005, Atlanta rapper Young Jeezy would release his debut album, Let's Get It: Thug Motivation 101. It would later go platinum and claim a so-called "revival" of the label. In 2009, DJ Khaled was named president of Def Jam South. As president, Khaled would oversee releases from Def Jam's southern artists like Young Jeezy, Ludacris, and Khaled's new protege, Ace Hood. Despite this, the artists' projects were released through the main Def Jam label. DJ Khaled left Def Jam South in 2011 after his label, We the Best Music, would be a part of Cash Money Records, a division of Def Jam's sister Universal Music label, Republic Records. There has been no official releases under Def Jam South, as of 2022.

Despite the shutdown, an official Spotify playlist exists under the label's profile with the division name, included with songs by Ludacris, Jeezy and recent Def Jam signees Fredo Bang and Kaash Paige.

== Former artists ==
- Big Boi
- DJ Khaled
- Ludacris
- Scarface
- Young Jeezy
