= Shareefa =

American singer-songwriter

- Born: Shareefa Faradah Cooper; March 12, 1984 (age 42); Newark, New Jersey
- Origin: Charlotte, North Carolina, U.S.
- Genres: R&B, hip hop
- Occupation: Vocalist
- Years active: 2005–present
- Labels: Disturbing tha Peace, Interscope
- Website: Official Shareefa website

Shareefa Faradah Cooper (born March 12, 1984), known professionally as Shareefa, is an American R&B singer. Shareefa has lived in Charlotte, North Carolina. She signed with Disturbing tha Peace/Def Jam Recordings in 2005. Her first single, "Need a Boss", featuring the rapper and labelmate Ludacris, was produced by Rodney "Darkchild" Jerkins, and reached #62 on the Billboard Hot 100. Her only album Point of No Return was released in October 2006 and charted at #25 on the Billboard 200.

== Discography ==
=== Albums ===
==== Studio albums ====
List of albums, with selected chart positions, sales figures and certifications
Title	Album details	Peak chart positions	
Title	Album details	U.S.	U.S. R&B
Point of No Return	Released: October 24, 2006; Label: Disturbing tha Peace, Def Jam; Formats: CD, LP, digital download	25	3

==== Compilation albums ====
List of albums, with selected chart positions, sales figures and certifications
Title	Album details	Peak chart positions			Sales	Certifications
Title	Album details	US	US R&B	US Rap	Sales	Certifications
Disturbing tha Peace (with Disturbing tha Peace)	Released: December 13, 2005; Label: Disturbing tha Peace, Def Jam; Formats: CD, LP, digital download	11	1	1	US: 630,000	RIAA: Gold
"—" denotes a recording that did not chart.

==== Mixtapes ====
- The Misunderstanding Of Shareefa (2010)

== Singles ==
=== As lead artist ===
Year	Song	U.S. Hot 100	U.S. R&B	Album
2006	"Need a Boss" (featuring Ludacris)	62	10	Point of No Return
2006	"Cry No More"	—	43	Point of No Return
2010	"By My Side" (featuring Rick Ross)	—	—	The Misunderstanding Of Shareefa
2010	"Should I Stay"	—	—	N/A
2013	"They Gon Learn"	—	—	N/A
2015	"Reloaded"	—	—	N/A
2017	"Boy Bye"	—	—	N/A
