= Shawnna discography =

- Studio albums: 2
- Singles: 36
- Mixtapes: 3
- Collaborative albums: 1

The discography of Shawnna, an American rapper from Chicago, consists of two studio albums, one collaborative studio album with Lateefa "Teefa" Harland as Infamous Syndicate, three mixtapes, and thirty-six singles (including twenty-two as a featured artist).

== Studio albums ==
Year	Album details	Peak chart positions		
Year	Album details	US	US R&B	US Rap
2004	Worth tha Weight: Release date: September 28, 2004; Label: DTP/Def Jam	22	5	4
2006	Block Music: Release date: June 6, 2006; Label: DTP/Def Jam	13	3	2
"—" denotes releases that did not chart

=== Infamous Syndicate albums ===
Year	Album details	Peak chart positions	
Year	Album details	US R&B	US Heat
1999	Changing the Game: Release date: March 16, 1999; Label: Relativity Records	50	18
"—" denotes releases that did not chart

== Official mixtapes ==
List of mixtapes, with year released
Title	Album details
Block Music: The Mixtape (Hosted by Clinton Sparks)	Released: 2006
M.O.E. Compilation Vol 1 (Hosted by DJ Dirty Money)	Released: 2012
She's Alive (Hosted by DJ Pharris)	Released: 2012

== Singles ==
=== Solo singles ===
Year	Single	Peak chart positions			Certifications (sales threshold)	Album
Year	Single	US	US R&B	US Rap	Certifications (sales threshold)	Album
2004	"Shake Dat Shit" (featuring Ludacris)	63	28	16		Worth tha Weight
2004	"Weight a Minute"	—	95	—		Worth tha Weight
2006	"Gettin' Some"	31	4	5	RIAA: Platinum	Block Music
2006	"Damn" (featuring Smoke of Field Mob)	—	91	—		Block Music
2011	"Big Booty Judy"	—	—	—		N/A
2013	"Tuesday" (featuring Mikkey Shilon)	—	—	—		N/A
2014	"What You Lookin For"	—	—	—		N/A
2017	"She a Freak"	—	—	—		N/A
2018	"Wobble"	—	—	—		N/A
2018	"Welcome to Chicago" (featuring Cold Hart of Crucial Conflict)	—	—	—		N/A
2019	"Round Here"	—	—	—		N/A
2019	"No Regular" (featuring Mikey Dollaz & Jucee Froot)	—	—	—		N/A
2019	"Jangalang"	—	—	—		N/A
2019	"What You Mean"	—	—	—		N/A
"—" denotes releases that did not chart

=== Featured singles ===
Year	Song	Chart positions				Album	
Year	Song	US	US R&B	US Rap	UK	Album	
1999	"Here I Go" (Infamous Syndicate)	—	63	8	—	Changing the Game	
2000	"What's Your Fantasy" (Ludacris featuring Shawnna)	21	10	5	19	Back for the First Time	
2003	"P-Poppin'" (Ludacris featuring Shawnna & Lil Fate)	—	—	—	—	Chicken-n-Beer	
2003	"Stand Up" (Ludacris featuring Shawnna)	1	1	1	14	Chicken-n-Beer	
2004	"I Caught Him Lookin'" (Janielle featuring Shawnna)	—	—	—	—	—N/a	
2009	"Juicy Like a Peach" (Rasheeda featuring Shawnna)	—	—	—	—	Certified Hot Chick	
2011	"Main Chick" (Yaddy Marquis featuring Shawnna & Klip Kapone)	—	—	—	—	—N/a	
2012	"Naked" (JayDoubL featuring Shawnna)	—	—	—	—	—N/a	
2014	"Get Low" (D Vokalz featuring Shawnna)	—	—	—	—	—N/a	
2014	"Late Night Session" (Fred Milla featuring Shawnna & Ricco Maze)	—	—	—	—	—N/a	
2014	"Good Good" (Wyldthang featuring Ray Wonder & Shawnna)	—	—	—	—	Rize	
2015	"Talkin Bandz" (Future Brown featuring Shawnna & DJ Victoriouz)	—	—	—	—	Future Brown	
2016	"Take Off the Edge" (HearonTrackz featuring Ty Money, Shawnna & Lyriq)	—	—	—	—	—N/a	
2016	"1st Class Chick" (J.R James featuring Shawnna)	—	—	—	—	—N/a	
2016	"2 the Moon (Send It Up)" (HearonTrackz featuring Shawnna & King Louie)	—	—	—	—	—N/a	
2017	"Like It" (Bandana Rose featuring Shawnna)	—	—	—	—	—N/a	
2018	"Spend tha Nite" (Hot Onez featuring Klip Kapone & Shawnna)	—	—	—	—	—N/a	
2018	"Cloud" (Archangel! featuring Shawnna & Cerioso)	—	—	—	—	—N/a	
2018	"Chicago" (Range Rover Hang featuring Shawnna)	—	—	—	—	Velar Music	
2019	"King God Legend" (M L Underwood featuring Boosie Badazz, Mutt Dogg, Shawnna & Trice da Artist)	—	—	—	—	—N/a	
2019	"New Shit" (Chi-P featuring Shawnna)	—	—	—	—	—N/a	
2020	"Hunnid" (Spacejam Melo featuring Shawnna)	—	—	—	—	—N/a	
2020	"Tear It Down" (featuring Chantay Savage)	—	—	—	—	—N/a	
2024	"Burning In My Soul (Just A Freak)" (Syleena Johnson featuring Twista & Shawnna)	—	—	—	—	—	—N/a
2024	2025	"WYM (What You Mean)" (featuring HearonTrackz)	—	—	—	—	—N/a

== Other charted songs ==
List of non-single songs, with selected chart positions, showing year released and album name
Title	Year	Peak chart positions		Album
Title	Year	US	US R&B	Album
"Diddy Rock" (Diddy featuring Twista, Timbaland & Shawnna)	2007	—	124	Press Play

== Guest appearances ==
List of non-single guest appearances, with other performing artists, showing year released and album name
Title	Year	Other artist(s)	Album
"What That Girl"	1999	Big Nastee'	My Life, Dreams & Feelings
"Fantasies"	1999	Bootleg	Death Before Dishonesty
"What's Your Fantasy"	2000	Ludacris	Incognegro, Back for the First Time and How High the Soundtrack
"What's Your Fantasy" (Remix)	2000	Ludacris, Trina, Foxy Brown	Back for the First Time
"Chi Town's Finest"	2000	Cap.One, Twista	Through the Eyes of a Don
"Pure Pressure"	2000	Cap.One	Through the Eyes of a Don
"Loverboy" (Remix)	2001	Mariah Carey, Ludacris, Twenty II, Da Brat	Glitter
"Get the Fuck Back"	2001	Ludacris, I-20, Fate Wilson	Word of Mouf
"Break Sumthin'"	2002	Ludacris, Lil' Fate, Tity Boi, I-20	Golden Grain
"Growing Pains (Do It Again)" (Remix)	2002	Ludacris, Lil' Fate, Scarface, Keon Bryce	Golden Grain
"Posted"	2002	—N/a	Golden Grain
"Pimp Council"	2002	Ludacris, Lil' Fate, Too $hort	Golden Grain
"R.P.M."	2002	Ludacris, Twista	Golden Grain
"N.S.E.W."	2002	Lil' Fate, Tity Boi, I-20	Golden Grain
"Slum"	2003	I-20, Tity Boi	2 Fast 2 Furious Soundtrack
"Block Reincarnated"	2003	Kardinal Offishall	2 Fast 2 Furious Soundtrack
"Stand Up"	2003	Ludacris	Chicken-n-Beer
"Pussy Poppin'"	2003	Ludacris, Lil' Fate	Chicken-n-Beer
"Ready 2 Move"	2003	Cap.1	Theory of Life
"Dip It Low" (Remix)	2004	Christina Milian	—N/a
"Slow Fuckin'"	2004	I-20	Self Explanatory
"Higher" (Remix)	2005	Do Or Die, Kanye West	D.O.D.
"I Caught Him Lookin'"	2006	Janielle	—N/a
"Diddy Rock"	2006	Diddy, Timbaland, Twista	Press Play
"4 Minutes" (Remix)	2006	Avant, Krayzie Bone, Layzie Bone	Director
"Gucci Bag"	2007	Playaz Circle	Supply & Demand
"Hold N' Back"	2007	Marques Houston, Mýa	Veteran
"Backseat Action"	2007	T-Pain	Epiphany
"I Might Be"	2007	Gucci Mane, The Game	Back to the Trap House
"Ballers"	2007	Gucci Mane	Back to the Trap House
"Wheaties"	2008	Tech N9ne	Killer
"Juicy Like a Peach"	2009	Rasheeda	Certified Hot Chick
"Bastards and Bitches"	2012	Don Cannon, Twista	Reloaded
"Topless"	2013	Young Noble, Gage Gully	The Year of the Underdogz
"Talking Bandz"	2015	Future Brown, DJ Victorious	Future Brown
"Good Good"	2015	Wyldthang, Raywonder	Rize
"Chicago"	2018	Range Rover Hang	Velar Music
"Look at Me"	2019	Spacejam Melo	Pearlitos Way Reloaded

== Videography ==
- "What’s Your Fantasy" (Ludacris featuring Shawnna)
- "Stand Up" (Ludacris featuring Shawnna)
- "Shake Dat Shit" (featuring Ludacris)
- "Gettin' Some"
- "Damn"
- "Caught Him Lookin'"
- "Loverboy (Remix)" (Mariah Carey featuring Da Brat, Ludacris, Shawnna & Twenty II)
- "Dude (Remix)" (Beenie Man featuring Ms. Thing & Shawnna)
- "All The Way Turnt Up NB Remix" (One Chance featuring T-Pain)
- "Point Em Out" (Tay Dizm featuring Shawnna)
- "Never Leave My Girl"
- "Lap Dance" She-Mix Ft GMGIRLS
- "Horror Show" Ft GMGIRLS
- "Big Fat" Ft Chella H
- "Snapbacks & Tattoo" She-Mix
