= Hussein Fatal discography =

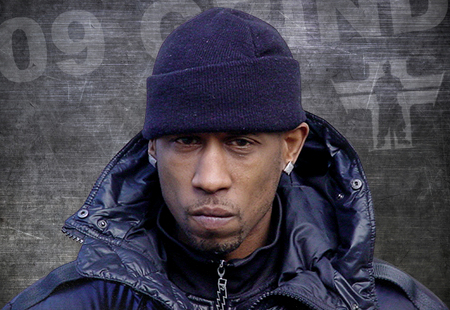
- Studio albums: 5
- Singles: 3
- Collaborative albums: 4
- Mixtapes: 20

This is the discography of rapper Hussein Fatal.

== Albums ==
=== Solo albums ===
- In the Line of Fire (March 24, 1998, Relativity) - chart position: 50 U.S.
- Fatal (November 19, 2002, Rap-A-Lot/Asylum Records)
- Born Legendary (June 16, 2009, Thugtertainment)
- The Interview: It's Not a Gimmik 2 Me (February 13, 2013, Thugtertainment)
- Ridin' All Week on 'Em (February 28, 2015, Thugtertainment)
- Legendary Status (July 10, 2018, Hussein Entertainment)

=== Collaboration albums ===
- With Young Noble - Thug in Thug Out (September 11, 2007, High Powered Entertainment, Thugtertainment, 1Nation & Koch Records)
- With Nutt-So - Outkasted Outlawz (October 5, 2010, Nutty's Playhouse Entertainment, Thugtertainment)
- With Outlawz - Perfect Timing (September 13, 2011, Krude Productions Inc.)
- With Young Noble - Jerzey Giantz (March 17, 2014, Outlaw, Thugtertainment)
- With T-Dhurr - Frapaveli EP (July 18, 2015, TriangularMarketProd, Thugtertainment)

=== Official mixtapes ===
Year	Title
2003	Fatalveli Vol. 1
2004	Fatalveli Vol. 2
2006	Section 8: Hustlin' in Front of Housing
2007	1090 Official (with Hardtimerz)
2007	Fatalveli Point 50
2007	Hussein Fatal Presents: New Jersey D.O.C
2008	Thugtertainment Presents: Essex County Kings
2008	Thugtertainment Presents: No Way Out
2008	Hussein Fatal Presents: New Jersey D.O.C Vol. 2
2008	Thugtertainment Presents: YAS - The Getaway
2008	Makaveli Soldiers
2009	Hussein Fatal Presents: Thugtertainment Soldiers
2009	Thugtertainment Presents: Pain Muzik
2009	Thugtertainment Presents: Ali Bang - Look At Me Now
2009	Digital Dynasty 8
2009	Thugtertainment Presents: Hussein Fatal - Trouble
2010	Bully The Block 4
2010	Unsigned On The Grind Vol. 5
2010	Killuminati 2K10 (with Outlawz)
2011	Capo Commission
2011	DJ Fatal Presents: The Official Hussein Fatal Remixes
2011	Killuminati 2K11 (with Outlawz)
2013	If U Aint Know Now U Do Vol.12: Special Edition
2013	Outlaw Nation Vol. 3 (with Young Noble)

== Singles ==
=== Solo ===
Year	Title	Peak chart positions	Album
Year	Title	US R&B	Album
1998	"Everyday" (featuring Antoinette Roberson)	79	In the Line of Fire
2009	"Wut You Talkin Bout" (featuring Jim Jones)	—	Born Legendary
2014	"Ridin All Week On Em'"	—	Ridin' All Week On 'Em

=== As featured performer ===
- 2005: "Rain on Me (Remix)" (Ashanti feat. Ja Rule, Charli Baltimore & Hussein Fatal)
- 2007: "Move Over" (Hydro feat. Rock City & Hussein Fatal)

== Guest appearances ==
Year	Title song	With performer(s)	Album
1996	"All About U"	2Pac, Yaki Kadafi, Dru Down, Nate Dogg, Snoop Dogg	All Eyez on Me
1996	"When We Ride"	2Pac, Mopreme Shakur, Yaki Kadafi, Big Syke, E.D.I., Kastro, Napoleon	All Eyez on Me
1996	"Hit 'Em Up"	2Pac, Outlawz	"How Do U Want It" (single)
1997	"Usual Suspects"	Mic Geronimo, DMX, Ja Rule, Cormega	How to Be a Player
1998	"Initiated"	Daz Dillinger, Kurupt, 2Pac, Kastro, E.D.I.	Retaliation, Revenge And Get Back
1998	"Oh No"	Gangsta Boo, Three 6 Mafia	Enquiring Minds
1999	"Clock Strikes 12"	Infamous Syndicate	Changing the Game
1999	"Paper Chase"	Tear Da Club Up Thugs	CrazyNDaLazDayz
2000	"Ride"	Do or Die	Victory
2000	"Playas Dream"	8Ball & MJG	Memphis Under World
2001	"War Tactics"	Guru, New Child, James Gotti	Baldhead Slick & Da Click
2001	"Save Me"	Mac Mall	Immaculate
2001	"We Gone Ride"	Yukmouth, Napoleon, Young Noble	Thug Lord: The New Testament
2002	"Redemption Rosary"	Benzino, Kid Javi	Redemption
2003	"Hit 'Em Up (Nu-Mixx)"	2Pac, The Outlawz	Nu-Mixx Klazzics
2003	"The Life"	Ja Rule, Caddillac Tah, James Gotti	Blood in My Eye
2003	"Blood in My Eye"	Ja Rule	Blood in My Eye
2003	"It's Murda (freestyle)"	Ja Rule	Blood in My Eye
2003	"The Wrap (freestyle)"	Ja Rule	Blood in My Eye
2003	"Somebody Gone Die 2 Nite"	Yukmouth, Tha Realest, Tech N9ne, Benjilino	Godzilla
2004	"Jaws Tight (OG Cypher)"	2Pac, Yaki Kadafi, E.D.I., Boot Camp Clik	Son Rize Vol.1
2004	"They Don't Give A F..."	2Pac, Yaki Kadafi	Son Rize Vol.1
2004	"First 2 Bomb (Remix)"	2Pac, Yaki Kadafi	Son Rize Vol.1
2004	"Secretz Rearranged (OG)"	2Pac, Yaki Kadafi	Son Rize Vol.1
2004	"Who Believes?"	2Pac, Yaki Kadafi	Son Rize Vol.1
2004	"Fresh Like Celery"	Yaki Kadafi	Son Rize Vol.1
2004	"Fresh Like Part 2"	Yaki Kadafi	Son Rize Vol.1
2004	"How Do U Want It (Remix)"	2Pac, Alicia Keys	Outlaw Warriorz Vol. 1
2005	"Every Hood"	Cormega, Niko	The Testament
2005	"Tupac Join"	Jim Jones, 40 Cal.	Harlem: Diary of a Summer
2005	"Rain on Me (Remix)"	Ashanti, Charli Baltimore, Ja Rule	Collectables by Ashanti
2005	"I Wanna' Be Free (Remix)"	2Pac, Young Noble	The Way He Wanted It
2006	"Dumpin'"	2Pac, Carl Thomas, Papoose	Pac's Life
2006	"Don't Stop"	2Pac, Yaki Kadafi, Big Syke, Young Noble, Stormey	Pac's Life
2006	"Untouchable"	2Pac, Gravy, Yaki Kadafi	Pac's Life
2007	"Keep Goin'"	2Pac	Nu-Mixx Klazzics Vol. 2
2007	"Got My Mind Made Up (Nu-Mixx)"	2Pac, Kurupt, The Outlawz	Nu-Mixx Klazzics Vol. 2
2007	"Picture Me Rollin' (Nu-Mixx)"	2Pac, The Outlawz, Danny Boy	Nu-Mixx Klazzics Vol. 2
2007	"Gangsta Party Part 2"	Daz Dillinger, Young Noble	Gangsta Party
2008	"Got Dat"	Yas da Hak, B. Drama, Ali Phaze	The Getaway
2008	"Loadin Up Bangaz"	S.K., Big Mizz	Essex County Kings
2008	"Hak Mob Athem"	Mass, Big Mizz, S.K., Phaze Ali, Ali Bang	Essex County Kings
2009	"This My Life"	Hardtimerz, Mass	Let Us In Vol. 2
2009	"Road Trip"	Verbal Assassin, Ali Bang	Play Timez Ova
2009	"Haters Get Cho Paper"	Outlawz, Crooked I	Outlaw Culture Vol. 1
2009	"Name Game"	Ali Bang, 2Tall, Sulaw	Look at Me Now
2009	"Feens"	Ali Bang, 2Tall	Look at Me Now
2009	"This Is How We Roll"	Ali Bang, 2Tall	Look at Me Now
2009	"She Loves Me Not"	Ali Bang, Bentley	Look at Me Now
2009	"Talkin That Talk"	Ali Bang	Look at Me Now
2009	"The Money"	Ali Bang	Look at Me Now
2009	"Alright We Getting Money"	Ali Bang, Hardtimerz	Look at Me Now
2009	"Gettin Money"	Talent of Da Hardtimerz, Hittman Da Menace, Ali Bang	Pay Attention
2009	"Where I Come From (Remix)"	Tha Advocate, Willy Northpole, Killah Priest, Stat Quo, DoItAll, Big Lou, Sha Stimuli, Mr. Probz	I Killed The Devil Last Night
2009	"Get That Money"	Kasinova Tha Don, Mr Bo'z	Heart of a Hustler
2009	"Label Me A Rebel"	Kasinova Tha Don	Thug Life
2009	"Gotta Have It"	Outlawz, Stormey Coleman, Tey Martel	Outlaw Culture Vol. 3
2009	"Move Over"	Hydro, Rock City	The Hydro Conspiracy
2010	"Everybody Goes Thru It"	Stormey Coleman, stic.man of Dead Prez, Young Noble, Janelle Hamilton	Big City Nightlife
2010	"Cleaned Off"	Young Buck, C-Bo, Young Noble, E.D.I.DON	Back on My Buck Shit Vol. 2: Change of Plans
2010	"Legends In Tha Game"	EDIDON, Young Noble	The Stash Spot
2010	"M.O.E."	Gonzoe	Gladiator School
2010	"The Struggle Continues (Alternative Original)	2Pac, Big Syke, O.F.T.B.	The Way He Wanted It Vol. 5
2010	"U Can Be Touched (Original)"	2Pac, The Outlawz, Suge Knight	The Way He Wanted It Vol. 5
2010	"Secrets Of War (Original I)	2Pac, The Outlawz	The Way He Wanted It Vol. 5
2011
2011	"Gettin To It"	Hypnotiq, Ace Hood	—N/a
2011	"Stolen Tears"	Hypnotiq, Sky	—N/a
2011	"Finally Made It"	Hypnotiq, Young Noble, Alegra Dolores	—N/a
2011	"Here Comes the Pain"	F.A.T.E The Future	Your Fates Been Sealed Vol. 1
2011	"Is Someone There"	F.A.T.E The Future, Five Star General	Your Fates Been Sealed Vol. 1
2011	"Live of a Hustla"	Shadoe, Picosso Stakks	Nail Bitting Season: New World Order Vol. 3
2011	"Invisible Man"	Professor A.L.I.	Carbon Cycle Diaries
2011	"M.O.E"	Gonzoe	Capo Commission
2011	"Over Here"	Aspects, Paragraph	Capo Commission
2011	"Stack Dough"	Gonzoe, Aspects, Bizarre	Capo Commission
2011	"U Don't Like That"	Young Noble, EDIDON	Capo Commission
2011	"What You Talkin' Bout"	Jim Jones	Capo Commission
2011	"Who We Are"	Aspects, Macadoshis	Capo Commission
2011	"D1"	—N/a	Capo Commission
2011	"Live That Life"	Gonzoe, Aspects, Jesse James	Capo Commission
2011	"All My Respect"	Nameless Kx, Young Noble	Nameless Begins / Ends
2012	"Get It Done"	Lye	Why Lye?
2012	"Car Cloudy"	Young Buck, Young Noble, EDIDON	Live Loyal Die Rich
2012	"Morning Light"	Gonzoe	The Dispensary
2012	"Salute"	Young Ridah, P-Thoro	A-State Heavyweight
2012	"All About the Franklins"	Young Noble, Gudda Gudda, Trae The Truth	Outlaw Rydahz Vol. 1
2012	"Vibe Wit Me"	Yas da Hak, Cash G Hakavelli	HAKin' Like My Daddy Vol. 2
2012	"Ride Out"	Bonze Roc, S.K., Big Mizz a.k.a. V12	HAK Muzik Vol. 3
2012	"Till I Die"	Young Noble, Suicide Ru, Yukmouth	Outlaw Nation
2012	"Rule of the Street"	Stormey Coleman, EDI	Outlaw Nation
2012	"Emancipation"	Young Noble, EDIDON	Son of God
2012	"Welcome To Real Life"	Young Noble, Arsonal Da Rebel, Tony Atlanta, King Malachi, Krayzie Bone	Son of God
2013	"I Wonder"	Young Noble, Deuce Deuce of Concrete Mob	Fast Life
2013	"Pay Witcha Life"	Young Noble, Suicide Ru, AKK	Outlaw Nation Vol. 2
2013	"Tonite"	EDIDON, Young Buck, Young Noble	O.G. Est. 1992
2013	"Angel"	Young Noble, Gage Gully, EDIDON	The Year of the Underdogz
2013	"Play Wit Your Life"	Da Kid Akk, Suicide Ru, Young Noble	Unfinished Business
2013	"Whats I Stand"	Tre Dolla, Young Noble	—N/a
2013	"Rapper wissen nicht wer sie sind"	Eko Fresh, Massiv	Eksodus
2014	"Dat Money"	Gritty Boi, Supa King	—N/a
2014	"Modern Day"	R.A.W., Young Shaad	—N/a
2014	"Why Explain The Game?"	F.D.T., Lil Mac, Young Noble	—N/a
2014	"Outlawz"	Wollidon	—N/a
2014	"You Ain't Bout Dat"	Get Rich	The Game Don't Sleep
2015	"Love U"	Troublez, B-Legit	Grandma's House
2015	"Interstate"	Rip The General	—N/a
2015	"Field of Fire"	Rich Roze	Uprize
2015	"Konspiracy Theory"	Rich Roze	Uprize
2015	"Carlitos Way"	Aspects	—N/a
2015	"Ya Don't Want It Wit Me"	Hypnotiq	—N/a
2015	"Invisible Man"	Professor A.L.I.	—N/a
2015	"Fuck With Ya"	C-Bo, Young Noble	The Mobfather II
2015	"Thats What I Do"	Rawsome Russ, Z-Ro	To Big To Fail
2015	"M.O.B."	Rawsome Russ, Lil Keke	From The Southside To WTX
2015	"Back In The Dayz"	MC Ron & Speechless, Joe	—N/a
2015	"Whats Poppin Scoob"	Parashoot Ent.	Parashoot Class 102
