= Diamond in the Back =

Single by Ludacris

from the album Chicken-n-Beer
- B-side: "We Got"
- Released: May 11, 2004
- Recorded: 2003
- Genre: Hip-hop
- Length: 4:12
- Label: DTP; Def Jam
- Songwriters: Christopher Bridges; Paul Beauregard; Jordan Houston; William DeVaughn
- Producers: DJ Paul; Juicy J

Ludacris singles chronology
| "Splash Waterfalls" (2004) | "Diamond in the Back" (2004) | "Break Bread" (2004) |

Music video
- "Ludacris - Diamond In The Back" on YouTube

"Diamond in the Back" is the fifth and final single released from the album Chicken-n-Beer by Ludacris. It is based on William DeVaughn's "Be Thankful for What You Got" and samples it heavily in the southern chopped and screwed format. It was produced by DJ Paul and Juicy J of Three 6 Mafia. This was Ludacris's first single to not hit the Billboard Hot 100's Top 40 and the Billboard Hot R&B/Hip-Hop Singles & Tracks' Top 20. The music video is directed in Atlanta and features cameo appearances by Lil Duval, Atlanta-based comedian Shawty, members of Ludacris' Disturbing the Peace label Shawnna, I-20, Bobby V, Tity Boi, David Banner, and the producer duo of DJ Paul and Juicy J.

== Chart positions ==
| Chart (2004) | Peak position |
|---|---|
| US Billboard Hot 100 | 94 |
| US Hot R&B/Hip-Hop Songs (Billboard) | 51 |
| US Rhythmic Airplay (Billboard) | 40 |

== Composers ==
- Beauregard, P.
- Devaughn, W.
- Houston, J.
- Bridges, C. R.
- Moody

== Release history ==
| Region | Date | Format(s) | Label(s) | Ref. |
|---|---|---|---|---|
| United States | June 1, 2004 | Rhythmic contemporary · urban contemporary radio | Def Jam South, IDJMG | |
