= Get Involved =

Get Involved may refer to:

- "Get Involved" (Raphael Saadiq and Q-Tip song), 1999
- "Get Involved" (Ginuwine song), 2010
- "Get Involved", a 2018 song by Craig David from The Time Is Now
- "Get Involved", a 1972 song by George Soulé
