= The PJs (soundtrack) =

The PJs: Music from & Inspired by the Hit Television Series

Soundtrack album by Various Artists
- Released: March 30, 1999
- Recorded: September–December 1998
- Length: 65:51
- Label: Hollywood Records
- Producer: Byron Phillips (exec.); Michael S. Traylor (exec.); Adam West; Ali Shaheed Muhammad; American Cream Team; DJ U-Neek; Jermaine Dupri; Jerry Wonder; Larry "Rock" Campbell; Meech Wells; No I.D.; Organized Noize; QDIII; Q-Tip; Raphael Saadiq; Rashad Coes; Rob Fusari; Rockwilder; Shabazz Curtis; Timbaland; Timmy Allen; Vincent Herbert; Wyclef Jean; Carl So-Lowe (co.); Maurice White (co.)

Singles from The PJs: Music from & Inspired by the Hit Television Series
- 1. "Here I Go" Released: January 26, 1999; 2. "Get Involved" Released: March 23, 1999

The PJs: Music from & Inspired by the Hit Television Series is the soundtrack to the animated sitcom The PJs issued in March 1999 by Hollywood Records. The soundtrack rose to No. 25 on the Billboard Top R&B/Hip-Hop Albums chart.

== Critical reception ==
Professional ratings
Review scores
Source	Rating
AllMusic	3/5 stars
Entertainment Weekly	B

With a B grade Ken Tucker of Entertainment Weekly commented "There's also uneven filler, but for a TV soundtrack, this is tough stuff." Heather Phares of Allmusic gave a 3 out of 5 stars rating saying "The PJs' soundtrack captures the energy and creativity of today's urban music."

== Track listing ==
No.	Title	Producer(s)	Length
1.	"It's Nothing" (performed by Jermaine Dupri, Da Brat and R.O.C.)	Jermaine Dupri; Carl So-Lowe (co.)	3:42
2.	"Talkin' Trash" (performed by Timbaland and Bassy)	Timbaland	4:35
3.	"Life in the Projects" (performed by Snoop Dogg)	Meech Wells	4:18
4.	"Hat Low" (performed by Goodie Mob)	Organized Noize	4:32
5.	"Way 2 Strong" (performed by Bizzy Bone)	DJ U-Neek	5:03
6.	"The Ghetto" (performed by Krayzie Bone and O)	DJ U-Neek	5:07
7.	"Giant Size" (performed by Raekwon and American Cream Team)	Rockwilder; American Cream Team	3:47
8.	"Rapid Fire" (performed by O)	Rashad Coes	3:51
9.	"Holiday" (performed by Earth, Wind & Fire featuring Marie Antoinette)	Jerry Wonder; Wyclef Jean; Maurice White (co.)	4:40
10.	"Get Involved" (performed by Raphael Saadiq and Q-Tip)	Raphael Saadiq; Q-Tip	3:14
11.	"What I Am" (performed by Sy Smith)	Ali Shaheed Muhammad	4:34
12.	"No More Rainy Days" (performed by Destiny's Child)	Rob Fusari; Vincent Herbert	4:25
13.	"Here I Go" (performed by Infamous Syndicate)	No I.D.; Shabazz Curtis	3:55
14.	"Til It's Over" (performed by Krumb Snatchas)	Adam West	3:40
15.	"Always Been You" (performed by Imajin)	Larry "Rock" Campbell; Timmy Allen	4:37
16.	"PJs" (performed by George Clinton feat. LaRita & Marie Norman)	QDIII	1:51
Total length:			1:05:51

== Charts ==
Chart (1999)	Peak position
US Billboard 200	86
US Top R&B/Hip-Hop Albums	25
