= Splash Waterfalls =

Single by Ludacris

from the album Chicken-n-Beer
- Released: February 17, 2004
- Recorded: 2003
- Length: 4:50; 4:30 (Whatever You Want remix)
- Label: Disturbing tha Peace, Def Jam
- Songwriters: Christopher Bridges, Michael Guy, Lawrence Mizell, Carl Wheeler, D'wayne Wiggins
- Producer: Icedrake

Ludacris singles chronology
"Yeah!" (2004)	"Splash Waterfalls" (2004)	"Diamond in the Back" (2004)

Music video
- "Ludacris - Splash Waterfalls (Official Music Video)" on YouTube

"Splash Waterfalls" is a song by Ludacris, released as the fourth single from his 2003 album Chicken-n-Beer. The song describes a desired love between two people, continually contrasting intimate romantic scenarios with more sexually explicit ones. The song features Sandy Coffee responding to Ludacris' verses, but she is not credited as featured guest on the single. This song's video and song content resembles another famous Ludacris single called "What's Your Fantasy", with its explicit lyrics and adult-like content. In the radio/music video version's lyrics, "touch me" replaces the explicit version's "fuck me". The song samples the 1978 version of "Be Ever Wonderful" by Ted Taylor.

== Remix ==
The official remix, "Splash Waterfalls (Whatever You Want Remix)", sampling Tony! Toni! Toné!'s "Whatever You Want", was released and features Sandy Coffee and Raphael Saadiq. The song was produced by The Trak Starz.

== Music video ==
In the video, Ludacris appears in a background of cold, blue mountains that resemble a utopia with Sandy Coffee singing "Make love to me" and "Touch me" ("F**k me" in the explicit version) every time Ludacris raps a verse accompanied with "Say it" and "What?" Along with Luda's previous videos, it alludes to the song's lyrics. Midway through the video, the song cuts out and the "Whatever You Want" remix of the song plays for the rest of the video, with Raphael Saadiq appearing. Malaysia Pargo, future wife of Jannero Pargo and co-star of Basketball Wives: LA, is among the women featured in the latter half of the video.

== Charts ==
=== Weekly charts ===
Chart (2004)	Peak position
US Billboard Hot 100	6
US Hot R&B/Hip-Hop Songs (Billboard)	2
US Hot Rap Songs (Billboard)	3
US Rhythmic Airplay (Billboard)	5

=== Year-end charts ===
Chart (2004)	Position
US Billboard Hot 100	42
US Hot R&B/Hip-Hop Songs (Billboard)	18
US Hot Rap Songs (Billboard)	8

== Composers ==
The composers of the song are:

- Guy, M.
- Mizell, L.
- Bridges, C
