= Bangladesh (music producer) =

American record producer (born 1978)

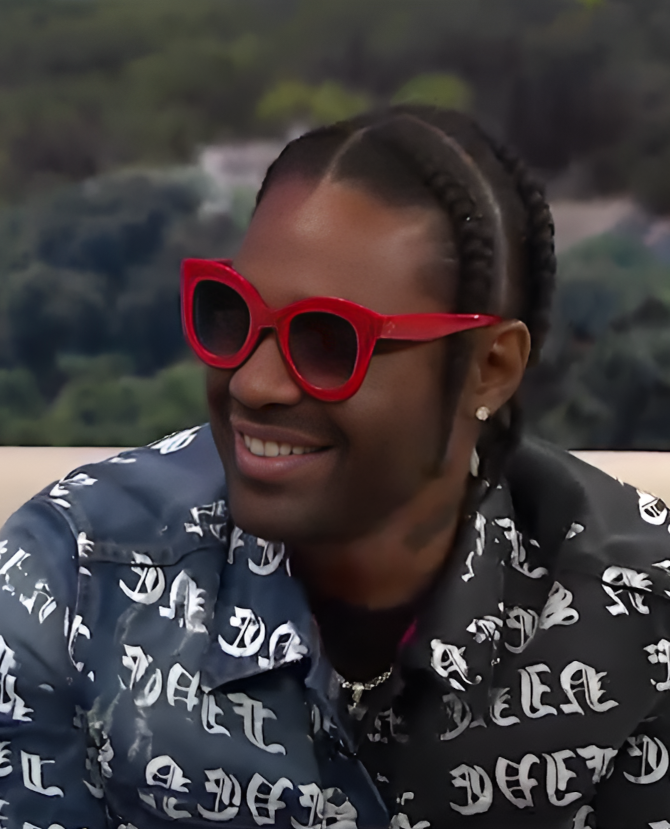
- Crawford in 2019

Background information
- Also known as: Bangladesh, Mr. Bangladesh, Shondrae
- Born: Shondrae Lee Crawford; February 24, 1978 (age 48); Des Moines, Iowa, U.S.
- Origin: Des Moines, Iowa, U.S.
- Genres: Midwestern hip-hop; R&B; pop
- Occupations: Record producer; songwriter; rapper; disc jockey
- Label: Disturbing Tha Peace

Shondrae Lee Crawford (born February 24, 1978), known professionally as Bangladesh, is an American record producer, songwriter, and rapper from Des Moines, Iowa. Crawford has stated that his professional moniker has nothing to do with the country of Bangladesh, noting that he and his friends originally used the term as slang to describe anything "cool or exotic." He has been credited with production work on the Billboard Hot 100-top 40 singles "What's Your Fantasy" by Ludacris, "A Milli" and "6 Foot 7 Foot" by Lil Wayne, "Diva" by Beyoncé, "Break Up" by Mario, and "Bossy" by Kelis. A two-time Grammy nominee, Crawford has also worked with Usher, Nicki Minaj, Brandy, Rihanna, Alicia Keys, and Ciara, among others.

Crawford established an eponymous record label in 2015, through which he signed fellow Midwestern producer Harv.

== Publishing disputes ==
In 2010, Crawford sued Lil Wayne over unpaid royalties stemming from "A Milli"; the lawsuit was settled amicably in 2012.

In 2023, Crawford finally received unpaid royalties from his contributions to Kelis' "Bossy" after 17 years as a result of her finally agreeing to the split-sheet created in 2006. According to Crawford, the singer never signed off on a split sheet for the song, which meant no royalties were paid out to those involved.

== Songwriting and production credits ==
Credits are courtesy of Discogs, Tidal, Apple Music, and AllMusic.

Title	Year	Artist	Album
"What's Your Fantasy" (Featuring Shawnna)	1999	Ludacris	Incognegro/Back for the First Time
"U Got a Problem?"	1999	Ludacris	Incognegro/Back for the First Time
"1st & 10" (Featuring Infamous 2-0 and Fate Wilson)	1999	Ludacris	Incognegro/Back for the First Time
"Ho"	1999	Ludacris	Incognegro/Back for the First Time
"Stick 'Em Up" (Featuring UGK)	2000	Ludacris	Back for the First Time
"What's Your Fantasy (Remix)" (Featuring Trina, Foxy Brown & Shawnna)	2000	Ludacris	Back for the First Time
"Coming 2 America"	2001	Ludacris	Word of Mouf
"Go 2 Sleep" (Featuring Three 6 Mafia, I-20 & Fate Wilson)	2001	Ludacris	Word of Mouf
"Get the Fuck Back" (Featuring Fate Wilson, Shawnna & I-20)	2001	Ludacris	Word of Mouf
"Freaky Thangs" (Featuring Twista & Jagged Edge)	2001	Ludacris	Word of Mouf
"Block Lockdown" (Featuring I-20)	2001	Ludacris	Word of Mouf
"R.P.M." (Featuring Shawnna, Twista and Ludacris)	2002	DTP	Golden Grain/Worth tha Weight
"Slum" (Featuring Shawnna and Tity Boi)	2003	I-20	2 Fast 2 Furious Soundtrack
"Intro"	2004	8Ball & MJG	Living Legends
"You Don't Want Drama" (Featuring Diddy)	2004	8Ball & MJG	Living Legends
"Forever" (Featuring Lloyd)	2004	8Ball & MJG	Living Legends
"Living Legends (Interlude)"	2004	8Ball & MJG	Living Legends
"Don't Make"	2004	8Ball & MJG	Living Legends
"Vibrate" (Featuring Rasheeda)	2004	Petey Pablo	Still Writing in My Diary: 2nd Entry
"Hotline"	2004	Ciara	Goodies
"I Be Comin' Down"	2004	Chamillionaire	The Mixtape Messiah
"I Tried to Tell Ya"	2004	Yung Wun	The Dirtiest Thirstiest
"Same Shit Different Day"	2005	Young Gunz	Brothers from Another
"Click Clack"	2005	Missy Elliott	The Cookbook
"No... Say No"	2005	N2U	Issues
"Bossy" (Featuring Too Short)	2006	Kelis	Kelis Was Here
"Aww Shit!" (Featuring Smoke)	2006	Kelis	Kelis Was Here
"Handful"	2006	Kelis	Kelis Was Here
"Pussy Poppin'" (Featuring Lloyd)	2006	Lil Scrappy	Bred 2 Die, Born 2 Live
"Make Dat Pussy Pop" (Featuring Paul Wall)	2006	Tha Dogg Pound	Cali Iz Active
"Spin the Bottle" (Featuring Shorty Da Kid)	2007	Cupid	Time for a Change
"Get Low"	2007	8Ball & MJG	Ridin High
"A Milli"	2008	Lil Wayne	Tha Carter III
"Diva"	2008	Beyoncé	I Am... Sasha Fierce
"Video Phone"	2008	Beyoncé	I Am... Sasha Fierce
"Talkin' Out da Side of Ya Neck!"	2008	Dem Franchize Boyz	Our World, Our Way
"Lemonade"	2009	Gucci Mane	The State vs. Radric Davis
"Stupid Wild" (Featuring Lil Wayne & Cam'ron)	2009	Gucci Mane	The State vs. Radric Davis
"Break Up" (Featuring Gucci Mane & Sean Garrett)	2009	Mario	D.N.A.
"Beam Me Up" (Featuring T-Pain & Rick Ross)	2009	Tay Dizm	Welcome to Tte New World
"Cut My Check"	2009	Tyga	The Potential
"Ghetto Tour Guide" (Skit)"	2009	Willy Northpole	Tha Connect
"Ghetto Tour Guide"	2009	Willy Northpole	Tha Connect
"Get Up, Get Down"	2009	Willy Northpole	Tha Connect
"Get It All" (Featuring Nicki Minaj)	2010	Sean Garrett	The Inkwell
"Did It On'em"	2010	Nicki Minaj	Pink Friday
"She Don't Know" (Featuring Ludacris)	2010	Usher	Raymond v. Raymond
"Everybody Drunk" (Featuring Lil Scrappy)	2010	Ludacris	Battle of the Sexes
"Party No Mo'" (Featuring Gucci Mane)	2010	Ludacris	Battle of the Sexes
"Rollercoaster" (Featuring Dru Hill & Shawnna)	2010	Ludacris	Battle of the Sexes
"She Couldn't Make It on Her Own" (Featuring OMG & Doughboy)	2010	Ice Cube	I Am the West
"Speak French" (Featuring Gucci Mane)	2010	Jamie Foxx	Best Night of My Life
"Get 'Em Girls" (Featuring Snoop Dogg)	2010	Jessica Mauboy	Get 'Em Girls
"Picture Phone Foreplay" (Featuring Kevin Cossom)	2010	Sheek Louch	Donnie G: Don Gorilla
"By My Side"	2010	Shareefa	The Misunderstanding Of Shareefa
"Sleazy"	2010	Kesha	Cannibal (EP)
"Move That Body" (Featuring T-Pain & Akon)	2010	Nelly	5.0
"Orange Juice"	2010	EarlWolf	Radical
"Don't Play No Game (That I Can't Win) (Remix)"	2011	Beastie Boys	Hot Sauce Committee Part Two
"Cockiness (Love It)"	2011	Rihanna	Talk That Talk
"6 Foot 7 Foot" (Featuring Cory Gunz)	2011	Lil Wayne	Tha Carter IV
"A Kiss"	2011	Bad Meets Evil	Hell: The Sequel
"So Obvious"	2011	Pusha T	Fear of God II: Let Us Pray
"So Sick"	2012	Brandy	Two Eleven
"Let Me Go"	2012	Brandy	Two Eleven
"Put It Down" (Featuring Chris Brown)	2012	Brandy	Two Eleven
"What You Need"	2012	Brandy	Two Eleven
"Love Through the Speaker"	2012	Kevin Cossom	Hook Vs. Bridge II
"Basshead" (Featuring YG)	2012	Far East Movement	Dirty Bass
"Dessert"	2012	JLS	Evolution
"Hottest Girl in the World"	2012	JLS	Evolution
"All the Way"	2012	JLS	Evolution
"Gotta Try It"	2012	JLS	Evolution
"Dope Peddler"	2012	2 Chainz	Based on a T.R.U. Story
"Drop"	2012	Rye Rye	Go! Pop! Bang!
"Hotter"	2012	Rye Rye	Go! Pop! Bang!
"They Point" (Featuring Juicy J & 2 Chainz)	2012	E-40	The Block Brochure: Welcome to the Soil 1
"IDGAF"	2013	Ludacris	#IDGAF
"Can I Have Your Attention"	2014	Lil Bibby	Free Crack 2
"Come Up"	2014	Kap G	Like a Mexican
"That Paper"	2014	Kap G	Like a Mexican
"Trappin Out the Mansion"	2014	Gucci Mane	East Atlanta Santa
"Classic" (Featuring Swizz Beatz)	2015	Meek Mill	Dreams Worth More Than Money
"El Chapo" (With Skrillex)	2015	The Game	The Documentary 2.5
"Kill" (Featuring Lil Wayne)	2015	Jadakiss	Top 5 Dead or Alive
"Bales"	2016	Gucci Mane	The Return of East Atlanta Santa
"Pay the Price"	2016	Yo Gotti	The Art of Hustle
"Breathe"	2017	T-Pain & Lil Wayne	T-Wayne
"Been a Minute" (Featuring August Alsina)	2017	Sevyn Streeter	Girl Disrupted
"Peace Sign" (Featuring Dave East)	2017	Sevyn Streeter	Girl Disrupted
"On Me" (Featuring Cardi B)	2018	Meek Mill	Championships
"Jefe" (Featuring Meek Mill)	2018	T.I.	Dime Trap
"I'm In Love U Lost" (Featuring Jacquees)	2020	Luke James	For No Reason
"6:30 Tip-Off"	2021	Conway the Machine	La Maquina
"Old Memories (Unlocked)" [songwriting]	2021	Alicia Keys	Keys
"Feinin"[ songwriting]	2022	Erica Banks	Diary of The Flow Queen
"Andre 3000" (With 7 & D Smoke)	2023	Conway the Machine	Drumwork: the Album
"F Everybody"	2023	idontknowjeffery	The Jeffery LP
"Presha"	2023	2 Chainz & Lil Wayne	Welcome 2 Collegrove
"I Luv It" (with Playboi Carti) [songwriting]	2024	Camila Cabello	C,XOXO
"Edible" (featuring Gunna) [songwriting]	2024	Flo Milli	Fine Ho, Stay
"Gucci Mane" [songwriting]	2025	Jessie Murph	Sex Hysteria
"This Right Here" (featuring Latto and Jazze Pha) [songwriting]	2025	Ciara	CiCi

== Guest appearances ==
List of guest appearances, with other performing artists, showing year released and album name
Title	Year	Other performer(s)	Album
"Rep Yo Click"	2018	Lil Jon, Freeway & Cyhi the Prynce	Superfly (soundtrack)

== Awards and nominations ==
Year	Ceremony	Award	Result	Ref
2009	ASCAP Rhythm & Soul Awards	Award-Winning R&B/Hip-Hop Songs (A Milli)	Won	
2009	ASCAP Rhythm & Soul Awards	Award-Winning Rap Songs (A Milli)	Won	
2009	51st Annual Grammy Awards	Grammy Award for Album of the Year (Tha Carter III)	Nominated	
2010	52nd Annual Grammy Awards	Grammy Award for Album of the Year (I Am... Sasha Fierce)	Nominated	
2010	BMI Urban Awards	BMI Top Urban Producers Award	Won	
2010	BMI Urban Awards	BMI Most-Performed Urban Songs Of The Year (Break Up)	Won	
2010	BMI Urban Awards	BMI Most-Performed Urban Songs Of The Year (Diva)	Won	
2010	ASCAP Rhythm & Soul Awards	Award-Winning R&B/Hip-Hop Songs (Diva)	Won	
