= Saturday (Oooh! Ooooh!) =

Single by Ludacris featuring Sleepy Brown

from the album Word of Mouf
- Released: January 8, 2002
- Recorded: 2001
- Genre: Hip hop
- Length: 3:52
- Label: Disturbing tha Peace, Def Jam
- Songwriters: R. Murray, R. Wade, P. Brown and C. Bridges
- Producer: Organized Noize

Ludacris singles chronology
"Growing Pains (Remix)" (2002)	"Saturday (Oooh! Ooooh!)" (2002)	"Why Don't We Fall in Love" (2002)

Sleepy Brown singles chronology
"Rollout (My Business)" (2001)	"Saturday (Oooh! Ooooh!)" (2002)	"Land of a Million Drums" (2002)

"Saturday (Oooh! Ooooh!)" is the third official single from Ludacris's third album, Word of Mouf. The song was written by R. Murray, R. Wade, P. Brown and C. Bridges and was produced by Organized Noize.

The song debuted on the Billboard Hot 100 at number 95 on February 16, 2002, reached the top 40 at number 37 on April 6, 2002, and peaked at number 22 on April 20.

== Charts ==
=== Weekly charts ===
Chart (2002)	Peak position
UK Singles (Official Charts)	31
US Billboard Hot 100	22
US Hot R&B/Hip-Hop Songs (Billboard)	10
US Hot Rap Songs (Billboard)	10

=== Year-end charts ===
Chart (2002)	Position
US Hot R&B/Hip-Hop Songs (Billboard)	60

== Release history ==
Region	Date	Format(s)	Label(s)	Ref.
United States	February 25, 2002	Rhythmic contemporary · urban contemporary radio	Def Jam South	
