= Chicken-n-Beer =

Chicken-N-Beer

Studio album by Ludacris
- Released: October 7, 2003
- Recorded: 2002–03
- Studio: PatchWerk Recording Studios
- Genre: Southern hip-hop; comedy rap
- Length: 60:22
- Label: Disturbing tha Peace; Ebony Son; Def Jam South
- Producer: Ludacris; Kanye West; Ruh Anubis "Moby Dick" Yazid; DJ Nasty & LVM; Icedrake; DJ Paul; Juicy J; Zukhan Bey; Erick Sermon; Black Key; T-Storm; Jook

Ludacris chronology
Word of Mouf (2001)	Chicken-N-Beer (2003)	The Red Light District (2004)

Singles from Chicken-N-Beer
- 1. "P-Poppin" Released: June 11, 2003; 2. "Stand Up" Released: August 19, 2003; 3. "Blow It Out" Released: September 28, 2003; 4. "Splash Waterfalls" Released: February 17, 2004; 5. "Diamond in the Back" Released: May 11, 2004

Chicken-n-Beer is the fourth studio album by American rapper Ludacris. It was released on October 7, 2003, by Disturbing tha Peace and Def Jam South Recordings. Recording sessions took place from 2002 to 2003, and it was handled by several record producers, including DJ Nasty & LVM, Kanye West, Mo B. Dick, DJ Paul, Juicy J and Ludacris himself. The album, Chicken-n-Beer is musically similar to Ludacris' previous work, with his use of a fast, highly versatile flow. Some of the songs on the album take a political overtone.

The album debuted at number one on the US Billboard 200, selling 429,000 copies in its first week; unlike Ludacris' previous albums, the album achieved success outside the United States, charting in several European territories; including Germany and the United Kingdom. Upon its release, Chicken-n-Beer received positive reviews, with critics praising Ludacris' technical rapping abilities and production choices, although some criticized the adult humor in the lyrics as excessive. It was supported by four singles that were released from the album, two of which – "Stand Up" and "Splash Waterfalls" – became Ludacris' first to peak in the top 10 on the US Billboard Hot 100.

== Lyrics and themes ==
Ludacris frequently employs a fast-paced flow on Chicken-n-Beer, whilst often suffusing the words he raps with humorous punchlines and innuendos. Writing for BBC Music, Lewis Dene noted Ludacris to typically incorporate "lightning-quick phrasing, cutting wit and reference points a plenty" into his lyrics. Many of the songs on Chicken-n-Beer are of a predominantly sexual nature, and there were compared by Nathan Rabin of The A.V. Club, to the material recorded by the likes of the hip-hop group 2 Live Crew. "Stand Up" was described as a "steamy sex rap", and "Hoes in My Room", a collaboration with fellow rapper Snoop Dogg, details a fictional encounter with a collection of groupies following a live performance. Rabin further observed that Ludacris addresses such topics with "irreverent glee", despite describing these themes "well-worn" and clichéd. Ludacris attacks political commentator Bill O'Reilly, who specifically criticized Ludacris for the content of his lyrics and noted him as a bad influence. "Blow It Out" and "Screwed Up" contain direct references to O'Reilly and his comments, as well as observations on the difficulties of fame.

== Commercial performance ==
The album debuted at number one on the US Billboard 200, becoming Ludacris' first album to top the chart: the overall first-week sales of 429,000 copies were an improvement on Ludacris' previous album Word of Mouf (2001), which sold 282,000 copies in its first week in the United States, debuting at number 3 on the Billboard 200. In its second week, Chicken-n-Beer fell to number 2, selling 194,000 copies, representing an overall sales decrease of 55% and bringing overall sales of the album to 623,000. The album spent five weeks inside the top ten of the chart, selling 936,000 copies in that time: it went on to spend a total of 45 weeks on the chart. It also peaked at number one on the US Top R&B/Hip-Hop Albums chart, although it remained on the chart for a longer length of time than on the Billboard 200, lasting a total of 51 weeks before exiting the chart. On June 18, 2004, the album was certified double platinum by the Recording Industry Association of America (RIAA) for shipments of 2,000,000 copies within the United States.

Unlike Ludacris' previous releases, Chicken-n-Beer achieved reasonable commercial success outside the United States. It became Ludacris' first album to chart in Australia, where it debuted and peaked at number 98, then exited the chart after a single week. The album peaked at number five on the Canadian Albums Chart: although it only spent a single week on the chart, no other Ludacris album has achieved a higher position on the chart, and was certified platinum by the Canadian Recording Industry Association on January 8, 2004. In Ireland, the album debuted and peaked at number 71 on the Irish Albums Chart, before exiting the chart the following week: to date, it remains Ludacris' only album to appear on the chart. In the United Kingdom, Chicken-n-Beer achieved a peak position of number 44 on the UK Albums Chart, spending a total of four weeks on the chart – the longest length of time any Ludacris album has lasted on the chart. It also became Ludacris' most commercially successful album in Germany, appearing at number 87 on the German Albums Chart in the only week in which it charted.

== Critical response ==
Professional ratings
Aggregate scores
Source	Rating
Metacritic	75/100
Review scores
Source	Rating
Allmusic	4.5/5 stars
The Austin Chronicle	3.5/5 stars
Blender	4/5 stars
Chicago Sun-Times	3/4 stars
Christgau's Consumer Guide	B+
Entertainment Weekly	B−
Los Angeles Times	3.5/4 stars
Q	3/5 stars
Rolling Stone	3/5 stars
USA Today	3/4 stars

Upon its release, Chicken-n-Beer received generally positive reviews from music critics. At Metacritic, which assigns a normalized rating out of 100 to reviews from mainstream critics, the album received an average score of 75, based on 10 reviews, which indicates "generally favorable reviews". John Bush of Allmusic noted Ludacris' "lightning-quick phrasing and cutting wit" and "rollicking, all-in-good-fun persona": he went on to commend the eccentric and upbeat nature of Ludacris' music, calling him "one of the few who's actually celebrating something – and having a great time doing it". Writing for Entertainment Weekly, Neil Drumming praised Ludacris' rapping skills, including his "explosive enunciation", "witty wordplay" and "punchline potency", although he reacted negatively towards the album's newer producers, feeling they use "campy sampling and cartoonish composition". Nathan Rabin of The A.V. Club complimented Ludacris' "impeccable comic timing" and his ability to "wring the most out of every line", although he also noted the album to be Ludacris' most "emotional, autobiographical major-label release to date". Although he dismissed much of the album's production as "duds", Rolling Stone writer Toure praised Ludacris' musical style as appealing to genres outside hip-hop music, calling him "cocksure, witty and just hard enough to be taken seriously" yet "playful enough to be pop": he further noted Ludacris to be one of the most technically skilled rappers of the time, stating:

Ludacris is one of the most liquid MCs in the game today. He varies his flows with such dexterity and has so much musicality in his tones that his mouth truly seems like an instrument. Ludacris is an outsize character – he's Mr. Fantastic from the Fantastic Four, perhaps a Southern Busta Rhymes, a guy who started as an Atlanta radio DJ but whose third album... finds him part of the hip-hop establishment.

— Toure

However, some felt the adult humour displayed on many the songs was excessive, and detracted from Ludacris' technical abilities. Jeffries called Ludacris' personality "cartoonish": Drumming noted "too many cuts are simply one-note jokes stretched out to three or four minutes", and criticized the album's female-orientated material as "cringeworthy, misogynistic snorefests", but admitted Ludacris to be "a funny guy" and called many of the featured insults and boasts "gut-busting... for days". In contrast, Rabin described Ludacris as "fun incarnate, the joyous embodiment of rap's commitment to hedonism at all costs" and felt that few rappers covered sexually orientated topics as well as Ludacris, "writing few of his peers mine the well-worn topics of freaky sex and drugged-out debauchery with such irreverent glee".

== Track listing ==
No.	Title	Writer(s)	Producer(s)	Length
1.	"Southern Fried Intro"	Christopher Bridges; Burt Bacharach; Charles Bobbit; Isaac Hayes; James Brown; Gloria Collins; Hal David; Johnny Mollings; Lenny Mollings; Fred Wesley	DJ Nasty & LVM	3:55
2.	"Blow It Out"	Bridges; Rondell Turner	Ron Browz	4:05
3.	"Stand Up" (featuring Shawnna)	Bridges; Kanye West; Rashawnna Guy	West; Ludacris^{[a]}	3:33
4.	"Rob Quarters" (skit, not included on censored version)	Terrence Battle	T-Storm	1:04
5.	"Splash Waterfalls"	Bridges; Michael Guy; Laurence Mizell	Icedrake	4:50
6.	"Hard Times" (featuring 8Ball & MJG and Carl Thomas)	Bridges; Marlon Goodwin; J. Mollings; L. Mollings; Mizell; Premro Smith	DJ Nasty & LVM	5:15
7.	"Diamond in the Back"	Bridges; Paul Beauregard; William DeVaughn; Jordan Houston	DJ Paul; Juicy J	4:12
8.	"Screwed Up" (featuring Lil' Flip)	Bridges; Wesley Weston, Jr.; Raymond Poole	Mo B. Dick	4:52
9.	"T Baggin'" (skit, not included on censored version)	Battle	T-Storm	0:53
10.	"P-Poppin" (featuring Shawnna and Lil' Fate)	Bridges; Zukhan Bey; R. Guy; Chad Hugo; Michael Tyler; Pharrell Williams; Arbie Wilson	Bey	4:50
11.	"Hip Hop Quotables"	Bridges; Erick Sermon	Sermon	3:09
12.	"Black Man's Struggle" (skit, not included on censored version)	Battle	T-Storm	0:35
13.	"Hoes in My Room" (featuring Snoop Dogg)	Bridges; Calvin Broadus, Jr.; Poole	Mo B. Dick	4:40
14.	"Teamwork"	Bridges; Mickey Davis	Black Key	3:46
15.	"Interactive" (skit, not included on censored version)	Battle	T-Storm	1:03
16.	"We Got" (featuring Chingy, I-20 and Tity Boi)	Bridges; Howard Bailey, Jr.; Beauregard; Tauheed Epps; Houston; Bobby Sandimanie	DJ Paul; Juicy J	4:21
17.	"Eyebrows Down" (featuring Playaz Circle)	Bridges; Torrey Cook	Jook	5:20
Total length:				60:22

United Kingdom bonus tracks
No.	Title	Writer(s)	Producer(s)	Length
18.	"Act a Fool"	Bridges; Keith McMasters	Keith Mack	4:30
19.	"Southern Hospitality (Remix)" (featuring Ms. Dynamite and Maxwell D)	Bridges; S. Santiago; Williams	The Neptunes	4:03
Total length:				68:55

Re-release bonus track
No.	Title	Writer(s)	Producer(s)	Length
18.	"Blow It Out (Remix)" (featuring 50 Cent)	Bridges; Curtis Jackson; Turner	Ron Browz	4:03
Total length:				64:25

Notes

- ^{^[a]} signifies a co-producer

== Personnel ==
Credits for Chicken-n-Beer adapted from Allmusic.

- Geoff Allen – engineer
- Burt Bacharach – composer
- Ken Bailey – A&R
- Mark Berto – engineer
- Zukhan Bey – composer, producer
- Black Key – producer
- Samuel Branch – engineer
- Ron Browz – producer
- Chingy – guest appearance, vocals
- Sandy Coffee – vocals
- T.F. Cook – composer
- M. Davis – composer
- Mickey Davis – engineer
- Jeff Dixon – marketing
- DJ Nasty – producer
- Dolla Boy – guest appearance, vocals
- Jimmy Douglass – mixing
- William "Poon Daddy" Engram – A&R
- Steve Fisher – engineer
- Cypress Fluellen – vocals
- John Frye – mixing
- Robert Hannon – engineer
- Matt Hennessey – engineer
- Eddie Hernandez – engineer
- Chad Hugo – composer
- Bill Importico – engineer
- Tia Johnson – art direction, design
- Scott Kieklak – engineer
- Portia Kirkland – marketing
- KLC – engineer
- Eritza Laues – vocals
- Lil' Fate – guest appearance, vocals
- Lil Pat – mixing
- Lil' Flip – guest appearance, vocals
- Ludacris – composer, executive producer, producer, vocals
- LVM – producer
- Tasniima Malik – vocals
- Deborah Mannis-Gardner – sample clearance
- MJG – guest appearance, vocals
- Lenny Mollings – Engineer, Keyboards
- Josh Monroy – engineer
- Roger Moody – engineer
- Phil Mucci – collage, photography
- Joel Mullis – engineer
- Erica Novich – A&R
- Jason Rea – engineer
- Patrick "Plain Pat" Reynolds – A&R
- Jason Rome – engineer
- Glenn Schick – mastering
- Erick Sermon – composer, producer
- Shawnna – guest appearance, vocals
- Azuolas Sinkevicius – engineer
- Snoop Dogg – guest appearance, vocals
- Sean Taylor – A&R
- Carl Thomas – guest appearance, vocals
- Tity Boi – guest appearance, vocals
- Michael Tyler – composer
- Kanye West – composer, producer
- Cory Williams – engineer
- Pharrell Williams – composer
- A. Wilson – composer
- Mike "Hitman" Wilson – engineer
- Ruh Anubis "Moby Dick" Yazid – engineer, instrumentation, keyboards, producer
- Chaka Zulu – executive producer, producer

== Charts ==
=== Weekly charts ===
Weekly chart performance for Chicken-n-Beer
Chart (2003)	Peak position
Australian Albums (ARIA)	98
Canada (Canadian Albums Chart)	5
Canadian R&B Albums (Nielsen SoundScan)	8
Germany (Media Control Charts)	87
Ireland (IRMA)	71
UK Albums (Official Charts Company)	44
US Billboard 200	1
US Top R&B/Hip-Hop Albums (Billboard)	1

=== Year-end charts ===
2003 year-end chart performance for Chicken-n-Beer
Chart (2003)	Position
US Billboard 200	63
US Top R&B/Hip-Hop Albums (Billboard)	32

2004 year-end chart performance for Chicken-n-Beer
Chart (2004)	Position
US Billboard 200	41
US Top R&B/Hip-Hop Albums (Billboard)	13

=== Decade-end charts ===
Decade-end chart performance for Chicken-n-Beer
Chart (2000–2009)	Position
US Billboard 200	186

== Certifications ==
Certifications for Chicken-n-Beer
Region	Certification	Certified units/sales
Canada (Music Canada)	Platinum	100,000^{^}
United Kingdom (BPI)	Gold	100,000^{^}
United States (RIAA)	2× Platinum	2,000,000^{^}
^{^} Shipments figures based on certification alone.

== See also ==
- List of Billboard 200 number-one albums of 2003
