= Word of Mouf =

Studio album by Ludacris
- Released: November 27, 2001
- Recorded: 2000–2001
- Studios: Patchwerk Recording (Atlanta, GA); Manhattan Center Studios (New York, NY); Hypnotized Minds Studio (Memphis, TN); The Hit Factory (New York, NY); Dungeon Recording Studios (Atlanta, GA); Noontime (Atlanta, GA); The Medicine Cabinet (Baton Rouge, LA); Quad Recording (New York, NY)
- Genre: Hip-hop
- Length: 78:52
- Labels: Disturbing tha Peace; Def Jam South
- Producers: Bangladesh; I-20; Jazze Pha; Jook; KLC; Ludacris; Mike Johnson; Organized Noize; P. King "The Specialist"; Swizz Beatz; Timbaland

Ludacris chronology
Back for the First Time (2000)	Word of Mouf (2001)	Chicken-n-Beer (2003)

Singles from Word of Mouf
- 1. "Area Codes" Released: July 3, 2001; 2. "Rollout (My Business)" Released: October 16, 2001; 3. "Saturday (Oooh! Ooooh!)" Released: January 8, 2002; 4. "Move Bitch" Released: May 21, 2002

Word of Mouf is the third studio album by American rapper Ludacris. It was released on November 27, 2001, through the record labels Disturbing tha Peace and Def Jam South.

Recording sessions took place at PatchWerk Recording Studios, Dungeon Recording Studios and Noontime in Atlanta, Georgia; Manhattan Center Studios, The Hit Factory and Quad Recording in New York, New York; Hypnotized Minds Studio in Memphis, Tennessee; and The Medicine Cabinet in Baton Rouge, Louisiana.

Production of the album was handled I-20, Jook, Swizz Beatz, Bangladesh (Shondrae Lee Crawford), Jazze Pha, Organized Noize, KLC, Mike Johnson, P. King "The Specialist", Timbaland, and Ludacris himself, who executive produced together with Chaka Zulu.

Word of Mouf features guest vocals from Fate Wilson, I-20, 4-Ize, Chimere, Jagged Edge, Jazze Pha, Keon Bryce, Mystikal, Nate Dogg, Shawnna, Sleepy Brown, Three 6 Mafia and Twista.

Four singles charted from the album: "Rollout (My Business)", "Area Codes", "Move Bitch", and "Saturday (Oooh! Ooooh!)".

Ludacris took part in the second edition of the Anger Management Tour, a popular concert series which took place from 2000 through 2005, in the Summer of 2002. The Summer 2002 Anger Management Tour performances were headlined by Eminem, and featured Ludacris, Papa Roach, Xzibit, X-Ecutioners and Bionic Jive. It was the only concert series in which Ludacris toured alongside both rap acts and rock acts at the same time.

Word of Mouf was nominated for a Grammy Award for Best Rap Album at the 45th Annual Grammy Awards on February 23, 2003, but lost to Eminem's The Eminem Show.

== Critical reception ==
Professional ratings
Aggregate scores
Source	Rating
Metacritic	67/100
Review scores
Source	Rating
AllMusic	3.5/5 stars
Entertainment Weekly	B
HipHopDX	3.5/5
Los Angeles Times	3/4 stars
NME	3.5/5 stars
RapReviews	8/10
Rolling Stone	3/5 stars
The New Rolling Stone Album Guide	3.5/5 stars
The Village Voice	B−
Tom Hull	A−

Word of Mouf was met with generally favourable reviews from music critics. At Metacritic, which assigns a normalized rating out of 100 to reviews from mainstream publications, the album received an average score of 67 based on eight reviews.

Tom Sinclair of Entertainment Weekly wrote: "with his fashionably foul worldview, Ludacris could indeed be Foxx's bastard son, and Word often seems like nothing so much as an extended Dolemite routine set to hip-hop beats". Robert Christgau of The Village Voice found Ludacris "raps and rhymes with gusto", adding: "song after song pumps the pimp theory that all women are whores. Rotate good-humored dance songs in which the best thing you say about female persons is that they crave your tallywhacker and the worst is that you'll murder them if they bother, and you'll change how real human beings of both sexes think and behave". Dele Fadele of NME stated that "there's a more commercial edge to the beats, as well as a subversive edge you'd expect from an MC who's cribbed from Eddie Murphy routines". Soren Baker of the Chicago Tribune also praised the album's comedic nature, commenting that "whether he's delivering a punchy one-liner, exaggerating his rhyme flow to a silly extreme or cleverly deploying pop culture references, Ludacris keeps the mood light and festive. Even his skits are funny enough that they could serve as the foundation for a top-tier comedy album".

In his mixed review, AllMusic's Jason Birchmeier called the album a "superstar affair that aims for mass appeal with a broad array of different styles" and enjoyed "witty puns and sly innuendoes" displayed in songs such as "Area Codes". However, he felt that "amid all of these various team-ups you do lose a little bit of the sincere, personal edge that had characterized much of Ludacris' debut".

== Commercial performance ==
In the United States, the album debuted at number three on the Billboard 200 and number-one on the Top R&B/Hip-Hop Albums charts, with first-week sales of 281,000 copies. On November 30, 2022, the album was certified four times platinum by the Recording Industry Association of America for selling 4,000,000 units in the US alone.

The album reached number 30 on the Canadian Albums and number 6 on the Canadian R&B Albums charts, and by June 27, 2002, was received platinum certification by Canadian Recording Industry Association for the sales of 100,000 copies in Canada.

In the United Kingdom, Word of Mouf peaked at number 57 on the UK Albums Chart, number 12 on the UK R&B Albums, and also number 74 on the Scottish Albums charts. It was certified gold by the British Phonographic Industry on July 22, 2013, selling 100,000 copies in the UK.

== Track listing ==
No.	Title	Writer(s)	Producer(s)	Length
1.	"Coming 2 America"	Christopher Bridges; Shondrae Crawford	Bangladesh	4:21
2.	"Rollout (My Business)"	Bridges; Timothy Mosley	Timbaland	4:56
3.	"Go 2 Sleep" (featuring I-20, Fate Wilson and Three 6 Mafia)	Bridges; Bobby Sandimanie; Arbie Wilson; Paul Beauregard; Darnell Carlton; Jordan Houston; Crawford	Bangladesh	5:10
4.	"Cry Babies (Oh No)"	Bridges; Kasseem Dean	Swizz Beatz	5:56
5.	"She Said" (featuring Fate Wilson)	Bridges; Patrick Brown; Ray Murray; Rico Wade	Organized Noize	4:33
6.	"Howhere" (Skit)	Bridges; Sandimanie	Ludacris; I-20	1:11
7.	"Area Codes" (featuring Nate Dogg)	Bridges; Nathaniel Hale; Phalon Alexander; William Lee Nichols	Jazze Pha	5:03
8.	"Growing Pains" (featuring Fate Wilson and Keon Bryce)	Bridges; Wilson; Keon Bryce; Peter Francis; William Bell; Booker T. Jones	P. King "The Specialist"	4:49
9.	"Greatest Hits" (Skit)	Bridges; Sandimanie	Mike Johnson	1:16
10.	"Move Bitch" (featuring Mystikal and I-20)	Bridges; Michael Tyler; Sandimanie; Craig Lawson	KLC	4:30
11.	"Stop Lying" (Skit)	Bridges; Sandimanie	Ludacris; I-20	1:36
12.	"Saturday (Oooh Oooh!)" (featuring Sleepy Brown)	Bridges; Brown; Murray; Wade	Organized Noize	3:50
13.	"Keep It on the Hush" (featuring Jazze Pha)	Bridges; Alexander	Jazze Pha	4:46
14.	"Word of Mouf (Freestyle)" (featuring 4-Ize)			2:11
15.	"Get the Fuck Back" (featuring Shawnna, I-20 and Fate Wilson)	Bridges; Rashawnna Guy; Sandiemanie; Wilson; Crawford	Bangladesh	5:21
16.	"Freaky Thangs" (featuring Twista and Jagged Edge)	Bridges; Carl Mitchell; Brandon Casey; Brian Casey; Tony Hayes; Crawford	Bangladesh	5:32
17.	"Cold Outside" (featuring Chimere)	Bridges; Torrey Cook	Jook	6:03
18.	"Block Lockdown" (featuring I-20)	Bridges; Sandimanie; Crawford	Bangladesh	7:48
Total length:				1:18:52

Sample credits

- Track 7 contains a sample of "Do It ('Til You're Satisfied)" written by Billy Nichols and performed by B. T. Express.
- Track 8 contains excerpt from the composition "I Forgot to Be Your Lover" written by William Bell and Booker T. Jones and performed by William Bell.

Notes

- Track 6, 9 and 11 are omitted from the clean version of the album.
- Track 18 is a bonus track containing "Welcome to Atlanta" as a hidden track that begins at 4:25 and lasts for 3:23 bringing the total time for track 18 to 7:48.

== Personnel ==
- Christopher "Ludacris" Bridges – vocals, producer (tracks: 6, 11), executive producer
- Mimi – additional vocals (track 1)
- Tauheed "Titty Boy" Epps – additional vocals (track 1)
- Shondrae "Bangladesh" Crawford – additional vocals (track 1), producer (tracks: 1, 3, 15, 16, 18)
- Shawty – additional vocals (track 1)
- Bobby "I-20" Sandimanie – vocals (tracks: 3, 10, 15, 18), producer (tracks: 6, 11)
- Arbie "Lil' Fate" Wilson – vocals (tracks: 3, 5, 8, 15)
- Paul "DJ Paul" Beauregard – vocals (track 3)
- Darnell "Crunchy Black" Carlton – vocals (track 3)
- Jordan "Juicy J" Houston – vocals (track 3)
- Brad "Scarface" Jordan – additional vocals (track 4)
- Nathaniel "Nate Dogg" Hale – vocals (track 7)
- Keon Bryce – vocals (track 8)
- Michael "Mystikal" Tyler – vocals (track 10)
- Patrick "Sleepy" Brown – vocals (track 12), producer (tracks: 5, 12)
- Phalon "Jazze Pha" Alexander – additional background vocals (track 7), vocals (track 13), producer (tracks: 7, 13)
- Vennessa Rolle – additional vocals (track 13)
- Dimitrius "Meet Meet" Stevens – additional vocals (track 13)
- Jeff A. Williams – additional vocals (track 13)
- Al D. Dickerson – additional vocals (track 13)
- Parrish D. Williams – additional vocals (track 13)
- Gospel Pasalmist Roxyedock – additional vocals (track 13)
- Devynaire Soul – additional vocals (track 13)
- Nard Holston – additional vocals (track 13)
- Tony "4-Ize" Hayes III – vocals (track 14), additional vocals (track 16)
- Rashawnna "Shawnna" Guy – vocals (track 15)
- Carl "Twista" Mitchell – vocals (track 16)
- Jagged Edge – vocals (track 16)
- Langston "Faizon Love" Santisima – additional vocals (track 16)
- Chimere Scott – additional vocals (track 17)
- Calvin Loatman – guitar (track 5)
- Marvin "Chanz" Parkman – piano (track 5)
- Ray Murray – bass (track 5), producer (tracks: 5, 12)
- DJ JayCee – scratches (track 5)
- Timothy "Timbaland" Mosley – producer (track 2)
- Kasseem "Swizz Beatz" Dean – producer (track 4)
- Rico Wade – producer (tracks: 5, 12)
- Peter "P. King 'The Specialist'" Francis – producer (track 8)
- Mike Johnson – producer (track 9)
- Craig "KLC" Lawson – producer & mixing (track 10)
- Torrey "Jook" Cook – producer (track 17)
- Kevin Parker – recording (track 1)
- Jimmy Douglass – recording & mixing (track 2)
- Derrick Williams – recording (tracks: 2, 16)
- Josh Butler – recording (tracks: 3, 16)
- Chris Theis – recording (track 4)
- Sean Davis – recording (track 5)
- Ramone Campbell – recording (track 5)
- AJ Wolfe – recording (track 7)
- Michael "Mike Fresh" Wilson – recording (tracks: 8, 10, 12, 15, 16, 18), mixing (track 18)
- Jason Rome – recording (track 13)
- Bill Importico – recording (track 16)
- Ismel "Nino" Ramos – recording (track 17)
- Ken "Duro" Ifill – mixing (tracks: 1, 3, 5, 7, 8, 12, 13, 15–18)
- Pat Viala – mixing (track 4)
- Jason Staten – recording assistant (tracks: 3, 8)
- Rob Herrera – recording assistant (track 4)
- Malcolm Gossett – recording assistant (track 10)
- Kin Bengoa – recording assistant (track 16)
- Chaka Zulu – executive producer
- Tia Johnson – art direction, design
- Butch Belair – photography

== Charts ==
=== Weekly charts ===
Chart (2001–2002)	Peak position
Canadian Albums (Nielsen SoundScan)	30
Canadian R&B Albums (Nielsen SoundScan)	6
German Albums (Offizielle Top 100)	98
Scottish Albums (Official Charts)	74
UK Albums (Official Charts)	57
UK R&B Albums (Official Charts)	12
US Billboard 200	3
US Top R&B/Hip-Hop Albums (Billboard)	1

=== Year-end charts ===
Chart (2002)	Position
Canadian Albums (Nielsen SoundScan)	108
Canadian R&B Albums (Nielsen SoundScan)	20
Canadian Rap Albums (Nielsen SoundScan)	9
US Billboard 200	10
US Top R&B/Hip-Hop Albums (Billboard)	2

== Certifications ==
Certifications for Word of Mouf
Region	Certification	Certified units/sales
Canada (Music Canada)	Platinum	100,000^{^}
United Kingdom (BPI)	Gold	100,000^{*}
United States (RIAA)	4× Platinum	4,000,000^{‡}
^{*} Sales figures based on certification alone.^{^} Shipments figures based on certification alone.^{‡} Sales+streaming figures based on certification alone.

== See also ==
- List of Billboard number-one R&B albums of 2001
