= The Code (album) =

Studio album by Young Noble & Deuce Deuce
- Released: April 25, 2016
- Recorded: 2015–2016
- Genre: Hip hop
- Length: 41:49
- Label: Concrete Enterprises; Outlaw Recordz

Young Noble & Deuce Deuce chronology
Fast Life (2013)	The Code (2016)	For My People (2017)

Young Noble chronology
The Year of the Underdogz (2013)	The Code (2016)	Powerful (2016)

Deuce Deuce chronology
Fast Life (2013)	The Code (2016)	Godz Plan (2017)

The Code is a collaborative studio album by rappers Young Noble of Outlawz & Deuce Deuce of Concrete Mob. It was released on April 25, 2016, on Concrete Enterprises. It is their second collaborative album their first one Fast Life was released in 2013.

== Track listing ==
No.	Title	Length
1.	"Nuthin' 2 Lose"	2:27
2.	"The Rules" (featuring EDIDON & Aktual)	3:16
3.	"90z Shit"	2:55
4.	"Politricks"	2:07
5.	"Anuther Day" (featuring Oso)	4:10
6.	"Eyez Open" (featuring Bad Azz & Tray Deee)	4:25
7.	"Used Too"	2:48
8.	"Turn Down" (featuring stic.man)	4:17
9.	"Time Waits for No One"	3:09
10.	"The Code" (featuring EDIDON)	4:30
11.	"Can’t Take No More" (featuring Spittin Cobra)	4:39
12.	"Progress"	3:06
