= Blow It Out (Ludacris song) =

Single by Ludacris

from the album Chicken-n-Beer
- Released: September 28, 2003
- Recorded: 2002
- Genre: Hip hop; Southern hip hop
- Length: 4:05
- Label: Def Jam; Disturbing Tha Peace
- Songwriters: Christopher Bridges; Rondell Turner
- Producer: Ron Browz

Ludacris singles chronology
| "Hot & Wet" (2003) | "Blow It Out" (2003) | "Yeah!" (2004) |

"Blow It Out" (also known as "Blow It Out Yo Ass") is the third single by Ludacris from the album Chicken-n-Beer. The diss song reportedly targets Bill O'Reilly due to O'Reilly's successful campaign against the artist to have the soft drink brand Pepsi end their professional relationship.

50 Cent made a remix to the song which was never officially released. In 2006 a re-issue of this album was released internationally, mostly Europe, the Middle East and China, with the 50 Cent remix as a bonus.

== Charts ==
| Chart (2003) | Peak position |
|---|---|
| US Hot R&B/Hip-Hop Songs (Billboard) | 56 |
