= Back for the First Time =

Studio album by Ludacris
- Released: October 17, 2000
- Genres: Southern hip-hop; dirty rap
- Length: 56:30
- Labels: Def Jam South; Disturbing Tha Peace
- Producers: Shondrae; I-20; Jermaine Dupri; Lil' Fate; Ludacris; Mike Johnson; Organized Noize; Timbaland; The Neptunes

Ludacris chronology
Incognegro (1999)	Back for the First Time (2000)	Word of Mouf (2001)

Singles from Back for the First Time
- 1. "What's Your Fantasy" Released: September 12, 2000; 2. "Southern Hospitality" Released: January 2, 2001

Professional ratings
Review scores
Source	Rating
AllMusic	3/5 stars
Christgau's Consumer Guide	(neither)
Entertainment Weekly	B+
NME	2/5 stars
RapReviews	7/10
Rolling Stone	3/5 stars

Back for the First Time is the commercial debut and second studio album by American rapper Ludacris. It was released on October 17, 2000, via Def Jam South and Ludacris's Disturbing tha Peace.

Production was handled by Shondrae, I-20, Jermaine Dupri, Lil' Fate, Mike Johnson, Organized Noize, Timbaland, The Neptunes, and Ludacris himself. It features guest appearances from I-20, Lil' Fate, Shawnna, 4-Ize, Foxy Brown, Pastor Troy, Trina, UGK and Pharrell Williams.

The album debuted at number 4 on the Billboard 200 and number 2 on the Top R&B/Hip-Hop Albums charts, with 133,000 copies sold in its first week in the United States. It was certified triple platinum by the Recording Industry Association of America on May 7, 2002 for selling over 3 million units in the US and also received a gold certification by Music Canada on April 19, 2001 for shipments of more than 50,000 copies in Canada.

Its lead single, "What's Your Fantasy", which previously appeared on Incognegro, made it to No. 21 on the Billboard Hot 100 and No. 10 on the Hot R&B/Hip-Hop Songs in the US and number 19 on the UK singles chart. On November 30, 2022, it was certified double platinum by the RIAA. The second single off of the album, "Southern Hospitality", peaked at No. 23 on the Billboard Hot 100 and No. 6 on the Hot R&B/Hip-Hop Songs in the US and number 25 on the UK singles chart. The album track, "Ho", which previously appeared on Incognegro, reached No. 103 on the US Hot R&B/Hip-Hop Songs.

== Track listing ==
No.	Title	Producer(s)	Length
1.	"U Got a Problem?"	Shondrae	4:55
2.	"Game Got Switched"	Organized Noize	4:09
3.	"1st & 10" (featuring Infamous 2-0 and Fate Wilson)	Shondrae	3:43
4.	"What's Your Fantasy" (featuring Shawnna)	Shondrae	4:35
5.	"Come on Over" (Skit)	Ludacris; Infamous 2-0	1:03
6.	"Hood Stuck"	Ludacris	4:21
7.	"Get Off Me" (featuring Pastor Troy)	Jermaine Dupri	2:45
8.	"Mouthing Off" (featuring 4-Ize)	Ludacris	3:01
9.	"Stick 'Em Up" (featuring UGK)	Shondrae	5:05
10.	"Ho (Skit)" ((Removed From The Clean Version))	Ludacris; Infamous 2-0	0:42
11.	"Ho" ((Removed From The Clean Version))	Shondrae	2:50
12.	"Tickets Sold Out" (Skit)	Mike Johnson	0:32
13.	"Catch Up" (featuring Infamous 2-0 and Fate Wilson)	Ludacris; Fate Wilson	4:14
14.	"Southern Hospitality" (featuring Pharrell)	The Neptunes	5:00
15.	"What's Your Fantasy (Remix)" (featuring Trina, Shawnna and Foxy Brown)	Shondrae	4:37
16.	"Phat Rabbit" (featuring Timbaland)	Timbaland	4:58
Total length:			56:30

== Critical reception ==
Initial reception for Back for the First Time ranged from positive to mixed. Rolling Stone gave the album three out of five stars, and noted Ludacris's lyricism, which "range from sublime," to "whimsical," to "head-scratching." AllMusic gave the album three out of five stars, noting how successful the original content originally in Incognegro, and praising the four new songs not included in the previous album.

NME gave the album two out of five stars, saying that the album is "...more thug rap with little depth or skills," and while people may find something in the album, they'd "have to be a serious hip-hop head – or have way too much time on [their] hands – to do so."

== Charts ==
=== Weekly charts ===
Chart (2000)	Peak position
UK Albums (Official Charts)	160
UK R&B Albums (Official Charts)	28
US Billboard 200	4
US Top R&B/Hip-Hop Albums (Billboard)	2

=== Year-end charts ===
Year-end chart performance for Back for the First Time
Chart (2000)	Position
US Top R&B/Hip-Hop Albums (Billboard)	96
Chart (2001)	Position
Canadian Albums (Nielsen SoundScan)	193
Canadian R&B Albums (Nielsen SoundScan)	42
Canadian Rap Albums (Nielsen SoundScan)	20
US Billboard 200	29
US Top R&B/Hip-Hop Albums (Billboard)	11

== Certifications ==
Region	Certification	Certified units/sales
Canada (Music Canada)	Gold	50,000^{^}
United States (RIAA)	3× Platinum	3,000,000^{^}
^{^} Shipments figures based on certification alone.
