= P-Poppin =

Single by Ludacris featuring Shawnna and Lil Fate

from the album Chicken-n-Beer
- Released: June 11, 2003
- Recorded: 2003
- Studio: Sound On Sound (New York, NY); Tree Sound Studios (Norcross, GA); Chicago Recording Company (Chicago, IL)
- Genre: Dirty rap
- Length: 4:49
- Label: Def Jam South
- Songwriters: Christopher Bridges; Rashawnna Guy; Arbie Wilson; Zukhan Bey; Pharrell Williams; Chad Hugo; Michael Tyler
- Producers: Zukhan Bey; The Neptunes

Ludacris singles chronology
"Act a Fool" (2003)	"P-Poppin" (2003)	"Stand Up" (2003)

Music video
- "Pussy Poppin'" on YouTube

"P-Poppin'" (edited as "Booty Poppin'" to make it less explicit) is the first single from Ludacris's fourth album Chicken-n-Beer. It features Shawnna and Lil Fate, and was jointly produced by Zukhan Bey and The Neptunes. The song samples "Danger (Been So Long)" by Mystikal.

== Music Video ==
In the music video Ludacris speaking with 2 Chainz in an early cameo, about a woman wearing stilettos despite having big feet. The video was filmed in Magic City, a popular strip club in Atlanta.

== Track listing ==
No.	Title	Writer(s)	Producer(s)	Length
1.	"Stand Up (Radio Version)" (featuring Shawnna)	Christopher Bridges; Kanye West	Kanye West; Ludacris (co.)
2.	"Stand Up (Main Version)" (featuring Shawnna)	Bridges; West	Kanye West; Ludacris (co.)
3.	"Stand Up (Instrumental)"	Bridges; West	Kanye West; Ludacris (co.)
4.	"P-Poppin' (Radio Version)" (featuring Shawnna and Lil' Fate)	Bridges; Rashawnna Guy; Arbie Wilson; Zukhan Bey; Pharrell Williams; Chad Hugo; Michael Tyler	Zukhan Bey
5.	"P-Poppin' (Main Version)" (featuring Shawnna and Lil' Fate)	Bridges; Guy; Wilson; Bey; Williams; Hugo; Tyler	Zukhan Bey
6.	"P-Poppin' (Instrumental)"	Bey; Williams; Hugo	Zukhan Bey
