= Instructions (album) =

Studio album by Jermaine Dupri
- Released: October 30, 2001
- Genre: Hip-hop
- Length: 52:42
- Labels: So So Def; Columbia
- Producers: Jermaine Dupri; Emmanuel Dean; The Neptunes; Swizz Beatz; Bryan-Michael Cox; Kanye West

Jermaine Dupri chronology
Life in 1472 (1998)	Instructions (2001)	Young, Fly & Flashy, Vol. 1 (2005)

Singles from Instructions
- 1. "Ballin' Out of Control" Released: 2001; 2. "Welcome to Atlanta" Released: May 14, 2002

Instructions is the second album by the American rapper and producer Jermaine Dupri, released by So So Def Recordings and Columbia Records on October 30, 2001. The album debuted at number 15 on the Billboard 200 on November 17, 2001.

== Critical reception ==
Professional ratings
Review scores
Source	Rating
AllMusic	2.5/5 stars
Blender	2/5 stars
The Source	3.5/5 stars
USA Today	1.5/4 stars

Blender editor Anthony Decurtis wrote: "An outstanding judge of talent, Dupri doesn’t get the difference between making hits and making statements. "Ballin’ Out of Control" (featuring the ubiquitous Nate Dogg) and "Get Some" (featuring Usher) sparkle like champagne bubbles. The rest falls as flat as an opened bottle of Cristal the morning after." Jason Birchmeier from AllMusic felt that "JD doesn't live up to his own hype on Instructions. His rhymes flow well but are overflowing with clichés and constant boasting. He's better at co-opting rhymes than coming up with his own [...] Like JD himself, Instructions seems to rely more on its surface gloss than its substance. Even so, there are several highlights, mostly courtesy of the guests."

== Commercial performance ==
Instructions debuted at number 15 on the US Billboard 200 on November 17, 2001.

== Track listing ==
No.	Title	Writer(s)	Producer(s)	Length
1.	"LP Intro"			0:24
2.	"Welcome to Atlanta" (featuring Ludacris)	Jermaine Dupri; Christopher Bridges; Kris Parker	Jermaine Dupri; Bryan-Michael Cox (co.)	3:20
3.	"Money, Hoes & Power" (featuring UGK, Pimpin' Ken and Manuel Seal)	Dupri; Bryan-Michael Cox; Chad Butler; Bernard Freeman	Dupri; Cox (co.)	3:50
4.	"The Dream (Interlude)" (featuring Wanda Sykes)	Wanda Sykes; Macio Parrilla		0:49
5.	"Get Some" (featuring Usher, R.O.C., Boo & Gotti)	Dupri; Cox; Rahman Griffin; Mwata Mitchell; Sabrian Sledge	Dupri; Cox	2:28
6.	"Hate (Interlude)"			1:06
7.	"Hate Blood" (featuring Jadakiss and Freeway)	Dupri; Jason Phillips	Dupri; Cox (co.)	3:55
8.	"Ballin' Out of Control" (featuring Nate Dogg)	Dupri; Nathaniel Hale; Cox; Griffin	Dupri; Cox (co.)	3:08
9.	"Supafly" (featuring Bilal)	Dupri; LaMarquis Jefferson; Bilal Oliver	Dupri; LaMarquis "ReMarqable" Jefferson (co.)	3:11
10.	"Instructions Interlude"			0:38
11.	"Rules of the Game" (featuring Manish Man)	Albert Lee Harris; Dupri	Manish Man; Dupri (co.)	3:36
12.	"Prada Bag (Interlude)"			0:15
13.	"Whatever" (featuring Nate Dogg, R.O.C., Tigah, Skeeter Rock, Trey Lorenz & Katrina)	Dupri; Griffin; Sheppard Daniels; Hale; Emanuel Dean	Dupri; Emanuel Dean (co.)	4:18
14.	"Let's Talk About It" (featuring Clipse and Pharrell Williams)	Dupri; Pharrell Williams; Chad Hugo; Gene Thornton; Terrence Thornton	The Neptunes	5:22
15.	"Yours & Mine" (featuring Jagged Edge)	Dupri; Kasseem Dean; Brandon Casey; Brian Casey	Swizz Beatz	3:25
16.	"Jazzy Hoe's Part 2" (featuring Kurupt, Too Short, Field Mob, Backbone and Eddie Cain)	Dupri; Carl Lowe; Shawn Johnson; Darion Crawford; Jamahr Williams; Ricardo Brown; Eddie Cain; Todd Shaw	Dupri; Cox (co.)	4:47
17.	"Hot Mama (Interlude)"			0:14
18.	"You Bring the Freak Out of Me" (featuring Da Brat and Kandi)	Dupri; Shawntae Harris; Kandi Burruss; Nick Ingram	Dupri; Cox (co.)	3:04
19.	"The Morning After"			0:24
20.	"Rock with Me" (featuring Xscape)	Dupri; Berry Gordy; Freddie Perren; Alphonse Mizell; Deke Richards	Dupri	4:30
21.	"Definition of a Pimp" (Japanese bonus track)	Dupri; Kanye West	Kanye West	3:13

Sample credits

- "Money, Hoes & Power" contains a sample of "Midnight and You" by Love Unlimited Orchestra.
- "Welcome to Atlanta" contains a sample of "Do It Baby" by Redd Holt Unlimited.
- "Let's Talk About It" contains a sample of "Rico Suave" by Gerardo.

== Charts ==
=== Weekly charts ===
Chart (2001)	Peak position
US Billboard 200	15
US Top R&B/Hip-Hop Albums (Billboard)	3

=== Year-end charts ===
Chart (2002)	Position
US Top R&B/Hip-Hop Albums (Billboard)	77
