= Area Codes (Ludacris song) =

2001 single by Ludacris and Nate Dogg

Single by Ludacris featuring Nate Dogg

from the album Rush Hour 2 Soundtrack and Word of Mouf
- Released: July 3, 2001
- Recorded: 2000
- Genre: Hip hop
- Length: 5:03
- Label: Disturbing tha Peace, Def Jam
- Songwriters: Jones, R. Walters, C. Bridges, Fred Tatlow
- Producer: Jazze Pha

Ludacris singles chronology
"One Minute Man" (2001)	"Area Codes" (2001)	"Rollout (My Business)" (2001)

Nate Dogg singles chronology
"Can't Deny It" (2001)	"Area Codes" (2001)	"I Got Love" (2001)

"Area Codes" is a song by the American hip hop recording artist Ludacris, released as the first single from his third album, Word of Mouf (2001). It features Nate Dogg. The song was originally released on the soundtrack to Rush Hour 2. The song's lyrics focus on U.S. telephone area codes that denote the location of women with whom the rapper has had sexual relations in cities across the United States.

The song was written by D. Davis, K. Hilson, J. Jones, R. Walters and C. Bridges and was produced by Jazze Pha.

== Overview ==
It entered the Billboard Hot 100 at No. 84 on July 14, 2001, and peaked at No. 24 on September 8, 2001.

== Music Video ==
The music video was filmed at an airport with dozens of women wearing clothing featuring the area codes of cities they are from. It even contained short clips of Rush Hour 2, in which the song was a soundtrack for. It premiered on 106 & Park as a "New Joint" on July 3, 2001.

The song was also included briefly in a scene from The Fast and the Furious.

== Cultural legacy ==
Because telephone area codes have increasingly become less constrained to particular geographic areas, a cultural critic has noted that the core conceit of the "Area Codes" song may become confusing to future generations of listeners not raised with the concept that a particular area code must be tied to residence in a particular region and not knowledgeable about the assigned area code numbering for major urban areas.

American rapper Kali interpolates the song in her song of the same name, released in 2023.

== Charts ==
=== Weekly charts ===
Chart (2001)	Peak position
Australia (ARIA)	97
France (SNEP)	43
New Zealand (Recorded Music NZ)	40
UK Singles (Official Charts)	25
UK Hip Hop/R&B (Official Charts)	1
US Billboard Hot 100	24
US Hot R&B/Hip-Hop Songs (Billboard)	10
US Hot Rap Songs (Billboard)	7
US Rhythmic Airplay (Billboard)	9

=== Year-end charts ===
Chart (2001)	Position
US Hot R&B/Hip-Hop Songs (Billboard)	60

== Certifications ==
Region	Certification	Certified units/sales
New Zealand (RMNZ)	Platinum	30,000^{‡}
United States (RIAA)	Gold	500,000^{‡}
^{‡} Sales+streaming figures based on certification alone.
