= Incognegro =

Studio album by Ludacris
- Released: August 17, 1999
- Recorded: 1998–1999
- Genre: Hip-hop; Southern hip-hop
- Length: 51:07
- Label: DTP
- Producer: Ludacris; Jermaine Dupri; Organized Noize; Infamous 2-0; Fate Wilson; Bangladesh

Ludacris chronology
Incognegro (1999)	Back for the First Time (2000)

Professional ratings
Review scores
Source	Rating
AllMusic	2/5 stars

Incognegro is the debut studio album by American rapper Ludacris. It was released on August 17, 1999, by Ludacris' newly founded independent record label, DTP Entertainment. Recording sessions took place from 1998 to 1999, with Ludacris serving as the record's executive producer, while the additional production was provided by Jermaine Dupri, Bangladesh and Organized Noize, among others. Eleven tracks would later appear on his second album.

== Promotion ==
The album track, "Ho", was released on July 15, 1998. The song was produced by American hip-hop record producer Bangladesh.

== Track listing ==
No.	Title	Producer(s)	Length
1.	"Intro"		0:15
2.	"U Got a Problem?"	Bangladesh	5:06
3.	"Game Got Switched"	Organized Noise	4:09
4.	"1st & 10" (featuring Infamous 2-0 and Fate Wilson)	Bangladesh	3:42
5.	"It Wasn't Us"	Ludacris	4:33
6.	"Come on Over (Skit)"		1:03
7.	"Hood Stuck"	Ludacris	4:26
8.	"Get Off Me" (featuring Pastor Troy)	Jermaine Dupri	2:45
9.	"Mouthing Off" (featuring 4-Ize)	Ludacris	3:00
10.	"Midnight Train" (featuring Chimere)	Ludacris	4:52
11.	"Ho (Skit)"		0:42
12.	"Ho"	Bangladesh	2:50
13.	"Tickets Sold Out (Skit)"		0:32
14.	"Catch Up" (featuring Infamous 2-0 and Fate Wilson)	Ludacris; Fate Wilson	4:16
15.	"What's Your Fantasy" (featuring Shawnna)	Bangladesh	4:35
16.	"Rock and a Hard Place"	Ludacris; Fate Wilson	4:21

== Chart positions ==
Chart (1999)	Peak position
US Billboard 200	179
US Top R&B/Hip Hop Albums (Billboard)	68
