= Welcome to Atlanta =

Single by Jermaine Dupri featuring Ludacris

from the album Instructions and Word of Mouf
- Released: November 24, 2001
- Recorded: 2001
- Genre: Hip-hop; Southern hip-hop
- Length: 3:16
- Label: So So Def; Columbia; Disturbing tha Peace; Def Jam South
- Songwriters: Jermaine Mauldin; Christopher Bridges; Bryan-Michael Cox; Jalil Hutchins; John Fletcher; Lawrence Smith; Frederick Perren; Christine Yarian
- Producers: Jermaine Dupri; Bryan-Michael Cox

Jermaine Dupri singles chronology
"Ballin' Out of Control" (2001)	"Welcome to Atlanta" (2001)	"Welcome to Atlanta (Coast 2 Coast Remix)" (2002)

Ludacris singles chronology
"Rollout (My Business)" (2001)	"Welcome to Atlanta" (2002)	"Fatty Girl" (2001)

"Welcome to Atlanta" is a song by American rapper Jermaine Dupri featuring fellow American rapper Ludacris. It was released in 2001 as the second single from Dupri's 2001 album Instructions, and appeared as a hidden track on Ludacris' second album, Word of Mouf. The song praises Dupri and Ludacris' hometown of Atlanta, Georgia. It interpolates "Five Minutes of Funk" by Whodini and samples "Do It Baby" by The Miracles.

Dupri released an official remix of the song, "Welcome to Atlanta (Coast 2 Coast Remix)", which features, in addition to Dupri and Ludacris, three rappers from other American cities extolling their own hometowns: P. Diddy (for New York City), Murphy Lee (for St. Louis) and Snoop Dogg (for Long Beach, California).

== Music video ==
The music video for "Welcome to Atlanta" was directed by Marc Klasfeld. It shows a tour bus being taken around Atlanta by the duo, as well as scenes of nightlife within the city. It features cameo appearances by many notable Atlanta-based rappers, singers and athletes, including Lil Jon, Lil Bow Wow, MC Shy D, Da Brat, T.I., Monica, Blaque, Usher, Tameka Cottle, Evander Holyfield, Vernon Forrest, Dominique Wilkins, Ying Yang Twins, CeeLo Green and Big Tigger.

== Coast 2 Coast Remix and music video ==
The official remix, "Welcome To Atlanta (Coast 2 Coast Remix)", features Murphy Lee, Snoop Dogg, Diddy and Ludacris on the intro and outro. Ludacris does not appear in the video. The Music Video was directed by Benny Boom. Murphy Lee would collaborate with Dupri again in 2003 on "What Da Hook Gon Be?" & would collaborate with Diddy again in 2003 on "Shake Ya Tailfeather".

=== Scene 1: Atlanta ===
Filming Locations:

- 2277 Cheshire Bridge Road NE, Atlanta, Georgia 30324
- 241 Forsyth St. SW, Atlanta, GA 30303

It starts with Jermaine Dupri coming out from the Dunk N Dine diner mixed with flashing pictures from the highway leading to Atlanta. He is seen wearing T-shirt a drawn face of Lisa "Left Eye" Lopes, which is an obvious tribute to her (deceased in April the same year). He is joined by fellow Atlantans including Lil Jon and Jazze Pha in the parking lot of the Magic City strip club. In the lyrics and some seconds-long camera shots he refers to hometown places Fuel, Kaya, Velvet Room, Club 112, Strokers club, Ritz club, Shark Bar, and Plush Limousine Service.

=== Scene 2: New York ===
Filming Location: 4 Penn Plaza, New York, New York 10001

P. Diddy is standing on the top of the Madison Square Garden entrance roof. Cut to scenes of other parts of the city, including Yankee Stadium are seen throughout. It has cameo appearances by Loon, Fabolous, Paul Cain, Maino, Black Rob, Stack Bundles DJ Clue?, Swizz Beatz and Jermaine Dupri. Mention is made about the September 11 attacks during the outro of the New York segment when Diddy boasts "we're still here...and we building four more new towers!"

=== Scene 3: St. Louis ===
Filming Location: 250 Stadium Plaza, St. Louis, Missouri 63102

The members of St. Lunatics (Murphy Lee, Nelly, Ali, Kyjuan and Slo'Down) are gathered in the Busch Memorial Stadium accompanied by 2002 season's St. Louis Cardinals player Fernando Viña and St. Louis Blues hockey goaltender Fred Brathwaite. Murphy Lee dressed in a Spirits of St. Louis jersey speaks about his loyalty expressed throughout his tattoos and jewelry. The St. Lunatics also dance outside of the stadium next to the statue of Stan Musial.

=== Scene 4: Long Beach ===
Filming Location: 1014 East Pacific Coast Highway, Long Beach, California 90806

Snoop Dogg invites the whole LBC to have a party with him at the same spot where they had one 9 years earlier in the square in front of the World Famous V.I.P. Records store, where Snoop performs his verse mounting the top of the building, like he did during the "What's My Name" video shoot. He also presents his Snoop Deville lowrider car, which was later used in the "From tha Chuuuch to da Palace" music video. Some of Snoop's entourage show up on the set, including Soopafly and Uncle Junebug.

== Other remixes ==
- The TNA Wrestling pay-per-view Bound for Glory 2007, which took place at the Arena at Gwinnett Center near Atlanta, used a metal-influenced instrumental cover of the song as its main theme.
- A remix called "Welcome to L.A". is done by Warren G where he presents his town. It appeared on the mixtape of DJ Felli Fel Featuring Snoop Dogg–The Heavy Hitters in 2002.
- Pitbull did an additional version of the song called "Welcome to Miami"
- Kardinal Offishall and Ones Project did a remix track entitled "Welcome to Toronto"
- Lil Boosie did a freestyle of the song entitled "Welcome to da Boot."

== Charts ==
=== Weekly charts ===
Chart (2002)	Peak position
US Billboard Hot 100	35
US Hot R&B/Hip-Hop Songs (Billboard)	15
US Hot Rap Songs (Billboard)	14
US Rhythmic Airplay (Billboard)	7

=== Year-end charts ===
Chart (2002)	Position
US Hot R&B/Hip-Hop Songs (Billboard)	48
