= Act a Fool (Ludacris song) =

Single by Ludacris

from the album 2 Fast 2 Furious
- Released: 2003
- Recorded: 2002–2003
- Genre: Hip hop
- Length: 4:30
- Label: DTP; Def Jam
- Songwriters: Christopher Bridges; Keith McMasters
- Producer: Keith Mack

Ludacris singles chronology
"Gossip Folks" (2002)	"Act a Fool" (2003)	"P-Poppin" (2003)

Music video
- "Ludacris - Act A Fool (Official Music Video)" on YouTube

"Act a Fool" is a song by American rapper Ludacris from the soundtrack for the 2003 film 2 Fast 2 Furious (in which he stars as Tej Parker). The song also appears on the U.K, edition of his fourth album Chicken-n-Beer. It was nominated for the Grammy Award for Best Song Written for a Motion Picture, Television or Other Visual Media.

== Charts ==
=== Weekly charts ===
Chart (2003)	Peak position
Australia (ARIA)	39
Australian Urban (ARIA)	15
US Billboard Hot 100	32
US Hot R&B/Hip-Hop Songs (Billboard)	20
US Hot Rap Songs (Billboard)	10
US Rhythmic Airplay (Billboard)	7

=== Year-end charts ===
Chart (2003)	Position
US Hot R&B/Hip-Hop Songs (Billboard)	90

== Certifications ==
Region	Certification	Certified units/sales
New Zealand (RMNZ)	Gold	15,000^{‡}
United States (RIAA)	Gold	500,000^{‡}
^{‡} Sales+streaming figures based on certification alone.
