= Stand Up (Ludacris song) =

2003 single by Ludacris

Single by Ludacris featuring Shawnna

from the album Chicken-n-Beer
- Released: September 2, 2003
- Genre: Crunk
- Length: 3:33
- Label: Def Jam South; Disturbing tha Peace; Ebony Son Entertainment
- Songwriters: Christopher Bridges; Kanye West
- Producer: Kanye West

Ludacris singles chronology
| "P-Poppin" (2003) | "Stand Up" (2003) | "Holidae In" (2003) |

Shawnna singles chronology
| "P-Poppin" (2003) | "Stand Up" (2003) | "Shake dat Shit" (2004) |

Music video
- "Stand Up" on YouTube

"Stand Up" is a song by American rapper Ludacris, released as the second single from his fourth album, Chicken-n-Beer (2003), on September 2, 2003. It contains a guest appearance from American rapper Shawnna, who provides a call-and-response dichotomy with Ludacris for the song's chorus. Production was handled by Roc-A-Fella Records producer Kanye West, while co-production was helmed by Ludacris, both of whom wrote the song.

"Stand Up" became Ludacris's first song to peak atop the US Billboard Hot 100, rising to number one on the week dated December 6, 2003. It also topped three other Billboard charts and entered the top 20 in Canada, Italy, New Zealand, and the United Kingdom. It received a Grammy Award nomination for Best Male Rap Solo Performance at the 46th Annual Grammy Awards, losing to Eminem's "Lose Yourself".

== Music video ==
A music video was made for "Stand Up", directed by Dave Meyers. Ludacris raps at a night club with many bizarre elements, such as a huge beer bottle, which he drinks from, a giant sneaker that he later wears, disabled people in wheelchairs dancing, a woman whose behind grows to a humongous proportion after kissing Ludacris, him and another woman as toddlers, and much more, with scenes mostly alluding to the song's lyrics. Chingy, Katt Williams, 2 Chainz, Scooter Braun, Kanye West (the song's producer), Tyra Banks and Lauren London made cameo appearances in the video.

== Charts ==
=== Weekly charts ===
| Chart (2003–2004) | Peak position |
|---|---|
| Australia (ARIA) | 30 |
| Australian Urban (ARIA) | 12 |
| Austria (Ö3 Austria Top 40) | 63 |
| Canada CHR (Nielsen BDS) | 7 |
| Germany (GfK) | 56 |
| Ireland (IRMA) | 43 |
| Italy (FIMI) | 19 |
| New Zealand (Recorded Music NZ) | 13 |
| Scotland Singles (Official Charts) | 28 |
| Switzerland (Schweizer Hitparade) | 22 |
| UK Singles (Official Charts) | 14 |
| UK Hip Hop/R&B (Official Charts) | 8 |
| US Billboard Hot 100 | 1 |
| US Hot R&B/Hip-Hop Songs (Billboard) | 1 |
| US Hot Rap Songs (Billboard) | 1 |
| US Pop Airplay (Billboard) | 9 |
| US Rhythmic Airplay (Billboard) | 1 |

=== Year-end charts ===
| Chart (2003) | Position |
|---|---|
| UK Urban (Music Week) | 29 |
| US Billboard Hot 100 | 51 |
| US Hot R&B/Hip-Hop Singles & Tracks (Billboard) | 26 |
| US Hot Rap Tracks (Billboard) | 14 |
| US Rhythmic Top 40 (Billboard) | 31 |

| Chart (2004) | Position |
|---|---|
| US Billboard Hot 100 | 45 |
| US Hot R&B/Hip-Hop Singles & Tracks (Billboard) | 53 |
| US Hot Rap Tracks (Billboard) | 23 |
| US Mainstream Top 40 (Billboard) | 40 |
| US Rhythmic Top 40 (Billboard) | 36 |

=== Decade-end charts ===
| Chart (2000–2009) | Position |
|---|---|
| US Billboard Hot 100 | 87 |

== Release history ==
| Region | Date | Format(s) | Label(s) | Ref. |
|---|---|---|---|---|
| United States | September 2, 2003 | Rhythmic contemporary; urban radio | Def Jam South; Disturbing tha Peace; Ebony Son Entertainment | |
| United States | October 6, 2003 | Contemporary hit radio | Def Jam South; Disturbing tha Peace; Ebony Son Entertainment | |
| United Kingdom | November 10, 2003 | 12-inch vinyl; CD | Def Jam South | |
| Australia | January 19, 2004 | CD | Def Jam South; Disturbing tha Peace; Ebony Son Entertainment | |

== Certifications ==
| Region | Certification | Certified units/sales |
|---|---|---|
| United States (RIAA) | Platinum | 1,000,000^{‡} |
^{‡} Sales+streaming figures based on certification alone.

== Remixes and cover versions ==
An official remix was also recorded, in which Ludacris' third verse was removed and replaced with a verse from Kanye West. The remix appeared on the Akademiks: JeaniusLevelMusikKanye West Vol. 2 and Kon The Louis Vuitton Don mixtapes.

Richard Cheese and Lounge Against the Machine covered the song as a lounge-style version on his 2004 album, I'd Like a Virgin.

Ludacris also made a remix of the song for the Atlanta Falcons.

Ludacris mixed this song with "Sweet Dreams (Are Made of This)" in a faster tone for some club radio stations.

== In popular culture ==
"Stand Up" appeared in a commercial for the all-new 2019 Mercedes-Benz A-Class Sedan that appeared during Super Bowl LIII on February 3, 2019. The commercial features Ludacris performing the song at an opera and also featured Wile E. Coyote and the Road Runner and Free Willy.
