= Shake Dat Shit =

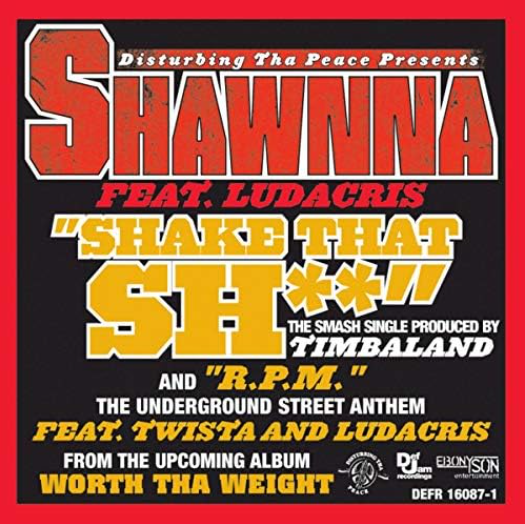

Single by Shawnna featuring Ludacris

from the album Worth tha Weight
- Released: July 20, 2004
- Recorded: PatchWerk Recording Studios (Atlanta, GA)
- Genre: Hip hop
- Length: 3:55
- Label: Disturbing tha Peace; Def Jam
- Songwriters: Christopher Bridges; Tim Mosley
- Producer: Timbaland

Shawnna singles chronology
"Stand Up" (2003)	"Shake Dat Shit" (2004)	"Weight a Minute" (2004)

Ludacris singles chronology
"Break Bread" (2004)	"Shake Dat Shit" (2004)	"Get Back" (2004)

Professional ratings
Review scores
Source	Rating
AllMusic	3/5 stars

"Shake dat Shit" often censored as Shake Dat S*** is the debut single by American rapper Shawnna featuring fellow American rapper Ludacris from the former's debut solo studio album Worth tha Weight. It was released on March 16, 2004 via Disturbing tha Peace/Def Jam Recordings. Produced by Timbaland, the song peaked at number 63 on the Billboard Hot 100.

== Track listing ==
No.	Title	Length
1.	"Shake That Sh** (Radio)" (featuring Ludacris)
2.	"Shake That Sh** (Main)" (featuring Ludacris)
3.	"Shake That Sh**" (Instrumental)
4.	"R.P.M. (Radio)" (featuring Twista and Ludacris)
5.	"R.P.M. (Main)" (featuring Twista and Ludacris)
6.	"R.P.M." (Instrumental)

== Charts ==
Chart (2004)	Peak position
US Billboard Hot 100	63
US Hot R&B/Hip-Hop SIngles Sales (Billboard)	31
US R&B/Hip-Hop Airplay Recurrents (Billboard)	1
US Hot R&B/Hip-Hop Songs (Billboard)	28
US R&B/Hip-Hop Airplay (Billboard)	27
US Hot Rap Songs (Billboard)	16
US Rhythmic Airplay (Billboard)	26
US Radio Songs (Billboard)	62

== Release history ==
Region	Date	Format(s)	Label(s)	Ref.
United States	July 19, 2004	Rhythmic contemporary · Urban contemporary radio	Disturbing tha Peace, Def Jam	
