= Here I Go (Infamous Syndicate song) =

1999 single by Infamous Syndicate

Single by Infamous Syndicate

from the album Changing the Game
- B-side: "Clock Strikes 12"
- Released: January 26, 1999
- Recorded: 1998
- Studio: CRC (Chicago)
- Genre: Hip hop
- Length: 3:56
- Label: Relativity
- Songwriters: Rashawnna Guy; Lateefa Harland; Ernest Wilson; Shabazz Curtis
- Producers: No I.D.; Shabazz Curtis

Shawnna singles chronology
"Here I Go" (1999)	"What's Your Fantasy" (2000)

Music video
- "Here I Go" on YouTube

Professional ratings
Review scores
Source	Rating
AllMusic	2/5 stars

"Here I Go" is the only single released from the Infamous Syndicate's debut album Changing the Game. It was written by Rashawnna Guy, Lateefa Harland, Ernest Wilson and Shabazz Curtis, recorded at CRC Studios in 1998, and released via Relativity Records on January 26, 1999. Produced by No I.D., "Here I Go" became a minor hit, making it to #63 on the Hot R&B/Hip-Hop Songs chart and #8 on the Hot Rap Songs.

== Track listing ==
No.	Title	Writer(s)	Producer(s)	Length
1.	"Here I Go" (Clean)	Rashawnna Guy; Lateefa Harland; Ernest Wilson; Shabazz Curtis	No I.D.; Shabazz Curtis	3:56
2.	"Here I Go" (Main)	Guy; Harland; Wilson; Curtis	No I.D.; Shabazz Curtis	3:56
3.	"Here I Go" (Instrumental)	Guy; Harland; Wilson; Curtis	No I.D.; Shabazz Curtis	3:56
4.	"Clock Strikes 12 (Clean)" (featuring Fatal)	Guy; Harland; Bruce Washington; Kanye West	Kanye West	4:38
5.	"Clock Strikes 12 (Main)" (featuring Fatal)	Guy; Harland; Washington; West	Kanye West	4:18
6.	"Clock Strikes 12 (Instrumental)" (featuring Fatal)	Guy; Harland; Washington; West	Kanye West	4:18

== Charts ==
Chart (1999)	Peak position
US Hot R&B/Hip-Hop Songs (Billboard)	63
US Hot Rap Songs (Billboard)	8
