= Get Involved (Raphael Saadiq and Q-Tip song) =

Single by Raphael Saadiq and Q-Tip

from the album The PJs: Music from & Inspired by the Hit Television Series
- Released: 1999
- Recorded: September 1998
- Genre: R&B; soul; hip hop
- Length: 3:14
- Label: Hollywood
- Songwriters: Raphael Saadiq; Kamaal Fareed; Gene McFadden; Kenny Gamble; Leon Huff; John Whitehead
- Producers: Raphael Saadiq; Q-Tip

Raphael Saadiq singles chronology
"Ask of You" (1995)	"Get Involved" (1999)	"Be Here" (2002)

Q-Tip singles chronology
"Got 'til It's Gone" (1997)	"Get Involved" (1999)	"Vivrant Thing" (1999)

"Get Involved" is a song by Raphael Saadiq and Q-Tip, released in 1999, from the soundtrack The PJs: Music from & Inspired by the Hit Television Series. Produced by the duo, the song contains elements of "I'll Always Love My Mama" by The Intruders. It peaked at 67 on the Billboard Hot 100 chart as well as 21 on the US Hot R&B/Hip-Hop Songs.

== Track listing ==
=== 12" single ===
A-side

1. "Get Involved" (Album Version)
2. "Get Involved" (Instrumental)

B-side

1. "Get Involved" (DJ Thomilla's Benztown RMX [Extended Version])
2. "Get Involved" (DJ Thomilla's Benztown RMX [Edit])

== Personnel ==
- Tasha Taylor - Backing vocals
- Dexter Simmons - Mixing engineer

== Charts ==
=== Weekly charts ===
Chart (1999)	Peak position
Netherlands (Dutch Top 40 Tipparade)	19
Netherlands (Single Top 100)	90
New Zealand (Recorded Music NZ)	42
UK Singles (OCC)	36
UK Dance (OCC)	12
UK Hip Hop/R&B (OCC)	5
UK Indie (OCC)	5
US Billboard Hot 100	67
US Hot R&B/Hip-Hop Songs (Billboard)	21
US Rhythmic Airplay (Billboard)	29

=== Year-end charts ===
Chart (1999)	Position
UK Urban (Music Week)	9
