= Rollout (My Business) =

Single by Ludacris

from the album Word of Mouf
- Released: October 2001
- Recorded: 2001
- Studio: Manhattan Center Studios (New York City, New York)
- Genre: Hip hop, comedy hip-hop
- Length: 4:56 (album version); 3:59 (radio edit)
- Label: Disturbing tha Peace, Def Jam
- Songwriters: Ludacris, Timbaland
- Producer: Timbaland

Ludacris singles chronology
"Area Codes" (2001)	"Rollout (My Business)" (2001)	"Welcome to Atlanta" (2001)

Music video
- "Rollout (My Business)" on YouTube

“Rollout (My Business)” is a song by American rapper Ludacris. It was the second single released from his third studio album Word of Mouf. The song, on whose writing and composition Ludacris collaborated with music-producer Timbaland, who also produced it, debuted at number 95 on the Billboard Hot 100 on November 10, 2001, reached the top 40 at number 34 on December 29, and peaked at number 17 on February 2, 2002. It was also nominated at the 45th Annual Grammy Awards in 2002 for Best Male Rap Solo Performance.

== Music video ==
The official music video for "Rollout (My Business)" was directed by Jeremy Rall. The music video consists of Ludacris driving around in a Mercedes-Benz to a variety of locations in Atlanta, partying, and rapping with a background of special effects applied to exaggerate the size of his head.

== Track listing ==
1. "Rollout (My Business)" (radio edit)
2. "Rollout (My Business)" (album version)
3. "Rollout (My Business)" (instrumental)

== Charts ==
Chart History
Chart Date	Position
2001-11-10	95
2001-11-17	85
2001-11-24	78
2001-12-01	71
2001-12-08	60
2001-12-15	47
2001-12-22	42
2001-12-29	34
2002-01-05	28
2002-01-12	32
2002-01-19	22
2002-01-26	22
2002-02-02	17
2002-02-09	17
2002-02-16	19
2002-02-23	23
2002-03-02	24
2002-03-09	24
2002-03-16	29
2002-03-23	33
2002-03-30	47

=== Weekly charts ===
Chart (2001–2002)	Peak position
Australia (ARIA)	84
Australia Urban (ARIA)	19
Ireland (IRMA)	48
Scottish Singles Sales (Official Charts)	33
UK Hip Hop/R&B (Official Charts)	2
UK Singles (Official Charts)	20
US Billboard Hot 100	17
US Hot R&B/Hip-Hop Songs (Billboard)	7
US Hot Rap Songs (Billboard)	20
US Pop Airplay (Billboard)	23
US Rhythmic Airplay (Billboard)	3
US Top 40 Tracks (Billboard)	25

=== Year-end charts ===
Chart (2002)	Position
US Billboard Hot 100	77
US Hot R&B/Hip-Hop Songs (Billboard)	50

== Certifications ==
Region	Certification	Certified units/sales
United States (RIAA)	Platinum	1,000,000^{‡}
^{‡} Sales+streaming figures based on certification alone.

== In popular culture ==
In 2026, the song is used in commercials for the hardware chain retail store Lowe's.
