= Fast Life (Young Noble & Deuce Deuce album) =

Studio album by Young Noble & Deuce Deuce
- Released: February 5, 2013
- Recorded: 2012–2013
- Genre: Hip hop
- Length: 52:19
- Label: Concrete Enterprises; Outlaw Recordz

Young Noble & Deuce Deuce chronology
Fast Life (2013)	The Code (2016)

Young Noble chronology
Son of God (2012)	Fast Life (2013)	The Year of the Underdogz (2013)

Deuce Deuce chronology
Fast Life (2013)	The Code (2016)

Fast Life is a collaborative studio album by rappers Young Noble of Outlawz & Deuce Deuce of Concrete Mob. It was released on February 5, 2013, on Concrete Enterprises. They released a second collaborative album The Code in 2016.

== Track listing ==
No.	Title	Length
1.	"Intro"	1:10
2.	"Fast Life"	2:36
3.	"Go Back"	3:03
4.	"Started With" (featuring Lucho)	3:25
5.	"Dollarz n Sense" (featuring EDI DON)	4:00
6.	"Beware" (featuring C-Bo & Stump Gets)	4:56
7.	"Sorry Ma"	3:58
8.	"I Wonder" (featuring Hussein Fatal)	4:12
9.	"No More"	3:06
10.	"Depend on Me" (featuring Kardinal Offishall)	4:57
11.	"Stay with Me" (featuring EDI DON)	4:39
12.	"Good Life" (featuring EDI DON)	4:10
13.	"The Streets" (featuring EDI DON & Black Jack)	3:38
14.	"AmeriCanadian Dream" (featuring Spice 1)	3:08
15.	"Outro"	1:12
