= Worth tha Weight =

Studio album by Shawnna
- Released: September 28, 2004
- Recorded: 2002–04
- Genre: Dirty rap; R&B
- Length: 57:02
- Label: Disturbing tha Peace; Def Jam
- Producer: Chaka Zulu (exec.); Jeff Dixon (exec.); Ludacris (exec.); Bangladesh; Brian "All Day" Miller; Brian "B-Crucial" Morton; DJ Nasty & LVM; Jermaine Dupri; Just Blaze; Kanye West; Keith McMasters; Michael Antonio "Icedrake" Guy; Rich Nice; Terrace Martin; Timbaland; Trackboyz; Dave Kelly; Sami Wilf

Shawnna chronology
Changing the Game (1999)	Worth tha Weight (2004)	Block Music (2006)

Singles from Worth tha Weight
- 1. "Shake Dat Shit" Released: July 20, 2004; 2. "Weight a Minute" Released: 2004

Worth tha Weight is the debut solo studio album by American rapper and singer Shawnna. Originally scheduled to be released in 2002, it was then delayed to Fall 2003. The album was ultimately released on September 28, 2004, by Def Jam Recordings and Disturbing tha Peace. Production was handled by several record producers, including B-Crucial, Just Blaze, Kanye West, Bangladesh, DJ Nasty & LVM, and Shawnna's brother Michael Antonio "Icedrake" Guy. It features guest appearances from Ludacris, Jermaine Dupri, Kardinal Offishall, Katt Williams, Missy Elliott, Noreaga, Rich Nice and Twista. The album peaked at number 22 on the Billboard 200 and, to date, has sold 136,000 copies to date in the U.S.

It was supported by two singles: Timbaland-produced "Shake Dat Shit" and Trackboyz-produced "Weight a Minute". The album contains three remixed tracks: "Posted" from DTP's 2002 compilation album Golden Grain, "Block Reincarnated" from the 2003 soundtrack album for John Singleton's action movie 2 Fast 2 Furious, and "Dude" from Beenie Man's 2004 album Back to Basics. The song "Let's Go" was featured on the 2004 video game Def Jam: Fight for NY, in which Shawnna also appeared as playable character.

== Critical reception ==
Professional ratings
Review scores
Source	Rating
AllMusic	3/5 stars
HipHopDX	4/5
RapReviews	7/10
USA Today	3/4 stars

Worth tha Weight received positive reviews from music critics. K.B. Tindal of HipHopDX gave high praise to Shawnna's display of technical delivery and knowledgeable vocabulary throughout her debut, saying that "At the end of the day Shawnna comes through with a great display for a freshman release on the solo end. Def Jam does it again but don't get it twisted, DTP is what's really poppin'". Steve 'Flash' Juon of RapReviews praised Shawnna and the production team for elevating the material with lyrical dexterity and energetic beats, saying that "At eighteen tracks and nearly 60 minutes long, you're not left with the impression Shawnna said anything really profound, but she did say it in an enjoyable way over an impressive selection of beats". AllMusic editor Andy Kellman praised the album's production and Shawnna's skills as a rapper despite tracks like "Posted (Remix)" and "Kick This One" being weak contributions, concluding that "Even with these nagging flaws, Shawnna holds her own and is only complemented -- never outshined -- by the many guest MCs".

== Commercial performance ==
Worth tha Weight debuted and peaked at number 22 on the US Billboard 200. By May 2006, it had sold 136,000 copies in the United States, according to Nielsen SoundScan.

== Track listing ==
No.	Title	Writer(s)	Producer(s)	Length
1.	"My Chicago (Part 1)"	Rashawnna Guy; Brian Morton	Brian "B-Crucial" Morton	1:02
2.	"Let's Go"	R. Guy; Justin Smith	Just Blaze	4:15
3.	"R.P.M." (featuring Twista and Ludacris)	R. Guy; Christopher Bridges; Carl Terrell Mitchell; Shondrae Crawford	Shondrae "Bangladesh" Crawford	4:35
4.	"Money Mike (Skit)" (performed by Katt Williams)	Micah Sierra Williams		0:14
5.	"Shake Dat Shit" (featuring Ludacris)	Bridges; Tim Mosley	Timbaland	3:55
6.	"U Crazy" (featuring Jermaine Dupri)	R. Guy; Jermaine Dupri; Sami Wilf; Leo Nocentelli; Art Neville; George Porter Jr.; Joseph Modeliste	Jermaine Dupri; Sami Wilf	3:53
7.	"Weight a Minute"	R. Guy; Mark Williams; Joe Kent; B. Booker; T. Luster	Trackboyz	4:19
8.	"My Chicago (Part 2)"	R. Guy; Morton	Brian "B-Crucial" Morton	1:27
9.	"What Can I Do" (featuring Missy Elliott)	R. Guy; Melissa Elliott; Brian Miller; Kanye West	Brian "All Day" Miller; Kanye West	3:25
10.	"Posted (Remix)" (featuring N.O.R.E.)	R. Guy; Michael Antonio Guy	Michael Antonio "Icedrake" Guy	4:18
11.	"So Real So Right"	R. Guy; Morton	Brian "B-Crucial" Morton	3:51
12.	"Dude? (Skit)" (performed by Rich Nice)	Rich Nice	Rich Nice	1:59
13.	"Kick This One"	Kirk Robinson; Lana Moorer	DJ Nasty & LVM	2:22
14.	"Super Freak"	R. Guy; Terrace Martin	Terrace Martin	4:13
15.	"Turn It Up"	R. Guy; M. Guy	Michael Antonio "Icedrake" Guy	3:49
16.	"Block Reincarnated (Remix)" (featuring Kardinal Offishall)	R. Guy; Jason Harrow; Keith McMasters	Keith McMasters	3:59
17.	"Cami's Solo"	C. Bradlee		0:40
18.	"Dude (The Remix)" (featuring Beenie Man and Ms. Thing)	R. Guy; Dave Kelly	Dave Kelly	4:34
Total length:				57:02

== Charts ==
Chart (2004)	Peak position
US Billboard 200	22
US Top R&B/Hip-Hop Albums (Billboard)	5
US Top Rap Albums (Billboard)	4
