= Changing the Game (album) =

Studio album by Infamous Syndicate
- Released: March 16, 1999
- Recorded: 1998–99
- Studio: CRC Studios; Chung King Studios
- Genre: Hip hop
- Length: 45:39
- Label: Relativity
- Producer: Peter Kang (exec.); Lenzy Harvey (exec.); Infamous Syndicate (exec.); Andy C.; Echo; Kanye West; Michael Antonio "Icedrake" Guy; Mr. Khaliyl; No I.D.

Shawnna chronology
Changing the Game (1999)	Worth tha Weight (2004)

Singles from Changing the Game
- 1. "Here I Go" Released: January 26, 1999

Changing the Game is the only studio album by Rashawnna "Shawnna" Guy and Lateefa "Teefa" Harland together known as Infamous Syndicate. It was released on March 16, 1999, via Relativity Records. Production was handled by No I.D., Kanye West, Andy C., Echo, Mr. Khaliyl, and Shawnna's brother Michael Antonio "Icedrake" Guy. It features guest appearances from Big Nastee, Cap.One, Fatal, Franklin Williams Jr., Kanye West and Kia Jeffries. The album peaked at number 50 on the US Billboard Top R&B/Hip-Hop Albums and at number 18 on the Heatseekers Albums. Its lead single, "Here I Go", was also featured on The PJs: Music from & Inspired by the Hit Television Series.

== Critical reception ==
Professional ratings
Review scores
Source	Rating
AllMusic	3/5 stars
The Source	3.5/5 stars

Changing the Game received positive reviews from music critics. Roxanne Blanford of AllMusic thought the duo brought a new perspective on common topics by offering an "eclectic music base and rap style that is both unique and appealing". The critic also praised the production on the album, saying that it adds "instrumental versatility and depth". The Source's André LeRoy Davis commended the duo's vocal performance, particularly "spiritually charged energy and a staccato flow", but thought some of the tracks lacked polish.

== Track listing ==
No.	Title	Producer(s)	Length
1.	"Intro"		0:29
2.	"Here I Go"	No I.D.; Shabazz Curtis^{[a]}	3:58
3.	"Bouncer" (Skit)		0:48
4.	"Hold It Down"	No I.D.	4:12
5.	"I Gave You Me" (featuring Kia Jeffries)	Mr. Khaliyl	4:57
6.	"What You Do to Me" (featuring Kanye West and Franklin Williams Jr.)	Kanye West	5:01
7.	"What That Boy Like" (featuring Bigg Nastee)	No I.D.	4:49
8.	"Clock Strikes 12" (featuring Hussein Fatal)	Kanye West	4:18
9.	"West Side" (featuring Cap.One)	Michael Antonio "Icedrake" Guy	3:38
10.	"It's Alright"	No I.D.	3:28
11.	"You Are Falling Off" (Skit)		0:28
12.	"It's on You"	Echo	3:59
13.	"City of Hustlas"	Kanye West	5:49
14.	"Jenny Jonez"	Andy C	3:57
Total length:			45:39

Notes

- ^{^[a]} signifies a co-producer

== Charts ==
Chart (1999)	Peak position
US Top R&B/Hip-Hop Albums (Billboard)	50
US Heatseekers Albums (Billboard)	18
