= Southern Hospitality (song) =

Single by Ludacris

from the album Back for the First Time
- Released: January 2001
- Recorded: 2000
- Studio: Master Sound Studios (Virginia Beach, Virginia)
- Genre: Hip-hop
- Length: 4:40
- Label: Disturbing tha Peace; Def Jam
- Songwriters: Christopher Bridges; Pharrell Williams; Charles Hugo
- Producer: The Neptunes

Ludacris singles chronology
"What's Your Fantasy" (2000)	"Southern Hospitality" (2001)	"Bia' Bia'" (2001)

"Southern Hospitality" is a song by American rapper Ludacris, released by Disturbing tha Peace and Def Jam Recordings in January 2001 as the second single from his second album Back for the First Time (2000). It was written alongside Pharrell Williams and Chad Hugo, both of whom produced the song as members of the production duo the Neptunes. Williams also performs the line "nigga, throw dem bows", heard in the song's hook and outro.

"Southern Hospitality" debuted at number 86 on the Billboard Hot 100 on the issue dated January 20, 2001, and peaked at number 23 on the issue dated March 24.

== Background ==
In an interview with GQ, Ludacris stated that he had eaten before hanging upside down for the music video, and vomited soon after recording the scene.

The song was a last-minute addition to the album, and Ludacris himself was surprised by its popularity.

== Music video ==
The official music video for the song was directed by Jeremy Rall. and cinema choreographed by Chuck Ozeas. It features cameo appearances by Lil Jon, Jazze Pha, Scarface and Too Short.

The video contains references to Atlanta life, including Ludacris' clothes (such as his limited-edition Atlanta 05 jersey from FUBU, and his Atlanta Hawks and Atlanta Braves jackets). The video highlights popular fast food restaurant Church's Chicken, which is headquartered in Atlanta. The video features locations on Auburn Avenue, also known as Sweet Auburn, which is considered the "commercial, cultural, and spiritual center of African American life in Atlanta prior to the civil rights movement." Thelma's Rib Shack, previously known as Auburn Avenue Rib Shack, is known to have been favored by Martin Luther King Jr.

=== Video description ===
The video opens with Ludacris walking out of a large mansion with two men behind him. He is wearing baggy clothes with a large chain and a grill. His friends are wearing similar attire. They pull up in front of a garage and get into an expensive Cadillac. They drive while looking at women on the side of the street. They begin to dance with the music. After rapping on top of the car, Ludacris and his friends stand in front of a rib shack, showing off their jerseys with "ATLANTA" on them. A man shows fried catfish and gives a shout out to the dirty south, while Black men in suits and suitcases start dancing to the music. Luda shows off his grill again, then begins to dance with a woman. The video switches between these scenes with everyone dancing along to the song. The beat changes, and two women are shown walking along the street, while Ludacris and his friends are smoking. He runs away into the street and gets hit by a car. Then Ludacris (now with an afro) keeps rapping upside down on the street, showing off people with big afros. The people introduced in all of the scenes continue to dance until the end of the video.

== Chart performance ==
The song entered music charts in January 2001, as the single from Lucadris' major label debut album, Back for the First Time. At the time of its debut in mid-January, the song sat at 86 on the Billboard Hot 100, but would see more commercial success as the year went on.

When asked in a 2023 interview on the ALL THE SMOKE podcast, Ludacris said there was immediate positive response from general audiences for the single. He stated that although he was satisfied with the song and the input he got from other artists, it was almost removed from the album because he did not think it would turn into the hit that it became.

While steadily continuing to climb the Billboard Hot 100 chart, the song also entered the Hot R&B/Hip-Hop Songs at number six, as well as the Hot Rap Songs chart at number five. In March 2003, it peaked at number 23 on the former chart. It remained on the charts for the following 12 weeks, before leaving with its final placement at 81 on June 2, 2001.

== Charts ==
"Southern Hospitality" Billboard Top 100 (2001) chart performance
Date	Position
2001-01-20	86
2001-01-27	68
2001-02-03	56
2001-02-10	38
2001-02-17	33
2001-02-24	25
2001-03-10	24
2001-03-03	25
2001-03-17	24
2001-03-24	23
2001-03-31	25
2001-04-07	36
2001-04-14	41
2001-04-21	46
2001-04-28	46
2001-05-05	55
2001-05-12	58
2001-05-19	66
2001-05-26	74
2001-06-02	81

=== Weekly charts ===
Chart (2001)	Peak position
US Billboard Hot 100	23
US Hot R&B/Hip-Hop Songs (Billboard)	6
US Hot Rap Songs (Billboard)	5
US Rhythmic Airplay (Billboard)	10

=== Year-end charts ===
Chart (2001)	Position
US Billboard Hot 100	77
US Hot R&B/Hip-Hop Songs (Billboard)	25
