= The Year of the Underdogz =

Studio album by Young Noble & Gage Gully
- Released: May 7, 2013
- Recorded: 2013
- Genre: Hip hop
- Length: 58:21
- Label: A.G.E. Entertainment; EMPIRE; Outlaw Recordz
- Producer: Cozmo

Young Noble chronology
Fast Life (2013)	The Year of the Underdogz (2013)	The Code (2016)

Gage Gully chronology
Cash On Delivery (2012)	The Year of the Underdogz (2013)	Harvest Season (2014)

The Year of the Underdogz is a collaborative studio album by rappers Young Noble & Gage Gully. It was released on May 7, 2013 by A.G.E. Entertainment and Empire Distribution.

== Track listing ==
No.	Title	Length
1.	"Intro: The Year of the Underdogz"	1:28
2.	"The Year of the Underdogz" (featuring Crooked I)	4:17
3.	"The Majority"	3:23
4.	"The Times"	3:31
5.	"Music Ease the Pain"	3:31
6.	"Northern California"	4:15
7.	"Hustleholic" (featuring Krayzie Bone)	4:36
8.	"My Way" (featuring Yukmouth)	3:46
9.	"All Green"	4:26
10.	"Runnin' Outta Time"	3:59
11.	"Loyalty Don't Exist"	3:15
12.	"Topless" (featuring Shawnna)	5:20
13.	"From the Start"	3:25
14.	"Angel" (featuring Outlawz)	5:27
15.	"Sold They Soul"	3:28
