= What's Your Fantasy =

2000 single by Ludacris

Single by Ludacris featuring Shawnna

from the album Incognegro and Back for the First Time
- Released: August 15, 2000
- Studio: The Hit Factory (New York City)
- Genre: Hip hop
- Length: 4:35
- Label: Disturbing tha Peace; Def Jam South
- Songwriters: Christopher Bridges; Shondrae Crawford
- Producer: Bangladesh

Ludacris singles chronology
"What's Your Fantasy" (2000)	"Southern Hospitality" (2000)

Shawnna singles chronology
"Here I Go" (1999)	"What's Your Fantasy" (2000)	"Loverboy (Remix)" (2001)

Alternative Cover

Music video
- "What's Your Fantasy" on YouTube

Professional ratings
Review scores
Source	Rating
AllMusic	3/5 stars
AllMusic	2/5 stars

"What's Your Fantasy" is a song by American rapper Ludacris from his independently released debut album Incognegro and his first major label studio album, Back for the First Time. It was released as his debut single on August 15, 2000, via Disturbing tha Peace and Def Jam South. Produced by Bangladesh and features fellow DTP rapper, Shawnna. The song is focused around the narration of explicit sexual fantasies. In addition to discussion of sexual intercourse and fellatio, Ludacris hints at cunnilingus and role-playing in the song.

The song peaked at number 21 on the US Billboard Hot 100 and number 19 on the UK Singles Chart. It was certified platinum by the Recording Industry Association of America (RIAA). In 2008, the song was ranked number 58 on VH1's "100 Greatest Hip-Hop Songs" list.

== Remix and sequel ==
The official remix of the song features verses from Trina, Shawnna and Foxy Brown. The single version runs 4:50 (clean radio edit) or 5:44 (explicit) and includes a new verse by Ludacris on the single version, while the album version runs 4:36 and only features him on the chorus In the remix, the three female artists go even further with explicit lyrics referencing cunnilingus, analingus, and other sex acts.

The fifth song off Chris Brown's six-track mixtape X Files is titled "Fantasy 2" which features Ludacris. He raps the famous "lick lick lick you from your head to your toes" line from "What's Your Fantasy" prior to his verse. The mixtape was released on November 19, 2013.

== Live performances ==
On April 2, 2015, in promotion of his eighth studio album Ludaversal, Ludacris performed a special acoustic rendition of the song with The Roots on The Tonight Show Starring Jimmy Fallon.

== Track listings ==
CD single

1. "What's Your Fantasy" (radio edit)
2. "What's Your Fantasy" (album version explicit)
3. "What's Your Fantasy" (remix) feat. Trina, Shawna and Foxy Brown
4. "What's Your Fantasy" (video)

12-inch single

A1. "What's Your Fantasy" (album version clean)
A2. "What's Your Fantasy" (instrumental)
B1. "What's Your Fantasy" (album version explicit)
B2. "What's Your Fantasy" (remix explicit) feat. Trina, Shawna and Foxy Brown

== Charts ==
=== Weekly charts ===
Chart (2000–2001)	Peak position
UK Singles (Official Charts)	19
US Billboard Hot 100	21
US Hot R&B/Hip-Hop Songs (Billboard)	10
US Hot Rap Songs (Billboard)	12
US Rhythmic Airplay (Billboard)	5

=== Year-end charts ===
Chart (2000)	Position
US Hot R&B/Hip-Hop Singles & Tracks (Billboard)	68
US Rhythmic Top 40 (Billboard)	62

Chart (2001)	Position
US Hot R&B/Hip-Hop Singles & Tracks (Billboard)	93
US Rhythmic Top 40 (Billboard)	23

== Certifications ==
Region	Certification	Certified units/sales
New Zealand (RMNZ)	Gold	15,000^{‡}
United States (RIAA)	2× Platinum	2,000,000^{‡}
^{‡} Sales+streaming figures based on certification alone.

== Release history ==
Region	Date	Format(s)	Label(s)	Ref.
United States	August 15, 2000	Rhythmic contemporary; urban radio	Disturbing tha Peace; Def Jam South	
United States	November 28, 2000	Contemporary hit radio	Disturbing tha Peace; Def Jam South	
United Kingdom	May 28, 2001	12-inch vinyl; CD	Disturbing tha Peace; Def Jam South	
