= Infamous Syndicate =

American hip hop group

- Also known as: Syndicate; The Syndicate
- Origin: Chicago, Illinois, U.S.
- Genres: Hip hop
- Years active: 1997–2000
- Label: Relativity
- Past members: Shawnna; Teefa

Infamous Syndicate was an American hip hop duo from Chicago, comprising the female rappers Rashawnna "Shawnna" Guy and Lateefa "Teefa" Harland.

== History ==
Rashawnna Guy and Lateefa met at Lateefa's 17th birthday party in 1997. After scoring local radio play with their demos, they signed with Relativity Records, who released their lone LP, Changing the Game, in 1999. The album peaked at No. 50 on the Billboard Top R&B/Hip-Hop Albums chart and No. 18 on the Heatseekers Albums chart on the strength of the single "Here I Go", which reached No. 63 on the Hot R&B/Hip-Hop Songs chart and No. 8 on the Hot Rap Songs chart. Relativity dropped the group in 2000, after which Shawnna pursued a solo career signing with Disturbing tha Peace; Lateefa worked in radio and as a street poet.

They also contributed to two Tetsuya Komuro-produced songs, Ami Suzuki's Please stay tuned (featuring Infamous Syndicate) from her album INFINITY EIGHTEEN Vol.2 released in 2000 and True Kiss Destination's Love Obligation from their single Everybody's Jealous in 1999.

== Discography ==
- Changing the Game (Relativity Records, 1999)
