= Shawnna =

American rapper (born 1978)

- Born: Rashawnna Guy; January 3, 1978 (age 48)
- Origin: Chicago, Illinois, U.S.
- Genre: Hip hop
- Occupations: Rapper; singer; songwriter
- Works: Shawnna discography
- Years active: 1996–present
- Labels: Get Money Gang; DTP; Def Jam South
- Formerly of: Infamous Syndicate

Rashawnna Guy (born January 3, 1978), better known by her stage name Shawnna, is an American rapper and singer from Chicago, Illinois. She is best known for her guest appearances on Ludacris' 2000 single "What's Your Fantasy", as well as his 2003 single "Stand Up"; the songs peaked at numbers 21 and one on the Billboard Hot 100, respectively. She signed with his record label Disturbing tha Peace, an imprint of Def Jam South to release her debut studio album, Worth tha Weight (2004) and its follow-up, Block Music (2006). The former spawned the single "Shake Dat Shit" (featuring Ludacris), while the latter spawned the top 40 single "Gettin' Some".

Guy is also a former member of the female Chicago rap duo Infamous Syndicate; they released their only studio album, Changing the Game (1999) through Relativity Records.

She is the daughter of the blues musician Buddy Guy.

== Career ==
Before she recorded her first album, Shawnna was featured on the remix to the song "Loverboy" by Mariah Carey for the album and movie Glitter. She was featured in the video along with Ludacris, Da Brat, and Twenty II.

She released two albums, Worth tha Weight (2004) which produced the singles "Shake Dat Shit" and "Weight a Minute", and Block Music (2006). Before Block Music was released she released an "official prelude", Block Music: The Mixtape, with Clinton Sparks.

She was also a playable in the video game Def Jam Fight For NY in 2004.

== Discography ==
- Worth tha Weight (2004)
- Block Music (2006)
