= Ciara discography =

Artist discography

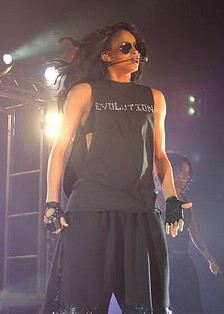
- Ciara performing during her debut tour Ciara: Live in Concert in November 2006
- Studio albums: 8
- Extended plays: 1
- Singles: 61

American singer Ciara has released eight studio albums, one extended play, one DVD, 61 singles (which includes 14 as a featured artist), eight promotional singles, and 28 music videos, including seven as a featured artist. She made her debut in 2004 with her debut album Goodies which debuted at three in the US and charted within the top 40 in several international markets. The album's title track peaked at number-one in the United States for seven weeks and gave the singer the title of "The First Lady of Crunk&B", while singles "1, 2 Step" and "Oh" reached the top three in the US. All three singles reached the top 10 in many international markets, with "Goodies" topping charts in the UK. Goodies was certified triple-Platinum in the United States, Platinum in Canada, and sold over five million copies worldwide. Ciara also participated in a number of successful collaborations, including US top five hits "Lose Control" with Missy Elliott, and "Like You" with rapper Bow Wow, as well as the US top 10 "So What" with group Field Mob.

Two years later in 2006, Ciara returned with her second album, Ciara: The Evolution. Having the similar success that Goodies had, Ciara: The Evolution debuted at number one on the Billboard 200, and charted in the top 30 of several international markets, reaching Platinum status in the US. The international lead single, "Get Up", reached the top 10 in the US and charted in international markets, while the US lead single, "Promise", topped the US R&B charts, and became her first top 20 hit in the US without a featured act. "Like a Boy" reached the top 20 in the US and many other international markets. During this time, Ciara took part as a featured artist in two songs, "Promise Ring" by Tiffany Evans and "Stepped on My J'z" by Nelly. In mid-2008, she was a part of Stand Up to Cancer's charity campaign and appeared on the single "Just Stand Up!". In May 2009, Ciara returned with her third album, Fantasy Ride. While sticking to her R&B and hip-hop sound, the album had a new pop and dance sound, as well as soul influences. Although the album debuted in the top 10 of the US, Ireland, and the United Kingdom, it was notably less successful compared to Ciara's previous albums, only selling 193,000 copies in the US in a year. One single from the album, "Love Sex Magic", however, was a worldwide top 10 hit. The album also spawned the top 10 US R&B hit "Never Ever", as well as the international single, "Work", which achieved moderate success. Also in 2009, Ciara collaborated with Spanish singer Enrique Iglesias on the international top ten hit, "Takin' Back My Love". Ciara's fourth studio album, Basic Instinct, was released on December 10, 2010. It saw the singer returning to her urban roots. The album's lead single, "Ride", was a top three hit on the US R&B/Hip-Hop chart.

Ciara's fifth album, Ciara was released on July 5, 2013, and reached number two on the US Billboard 200. Its lead single, "Body Party", peaked at number 22 on the Billboard Hot 100 and number six on the Billboard R&B/Hip Hop chart, making it her thirteenth Top 10 hit and thirteenth Top 40 hit, respectively. It was also preceded by the single "I'm Out", featuring Nicki Minaj, which reached No. 44 on the Billboard Hot 100. Albums Jackie (2015) and Beauty Marks (2019) soon followed. Ciara's EP Ci Ci was released on August 18, 2023. It was preceded by the collaboration single "How We Roll", with Chris Brown, was released on August 4, 2023. Ciara's eighth studio album, also titled CiCi, was released on August 22, 2025; the single "Ecstasy" was released in April 2025.

Prior to the release of her third studio album, Ciara sold over seven million albums worldwide, and as of June 2010, she had sold more than 4.3 million albums and 6.9 million digital tracks in the US alone. As of 2019, Ciara's worldwide sales total 45 million, including 23 million records and 22 million singles.

== Albums ==
=== Studio albums ===
List of studio albums, with selected chart positions, sales figures and certifications
Title	Details	Peak chart positions										Sales	Certifications
Title	Details	US	US R&B/ HH	AUS	CAN	FRA	GER	IRL	NZ	SWI	UK	Sales	Certifications
Goodies	Released: September 28, 2004; Label: Sho'nuff, LaFace; Formats: CD, vinyl, cassette, digital download	3	1	46	20	65	67	36	29	52	26	US: 2,748,000	RIAA: 4× Platinum; BPI: Gold; IRMA: Gold; MC: Platinum; RMNZ: 2× Platinum
Ciara: The Evolution	Released: December 5, 2006; Label: LaFace; Formats: CD, cassette, digital download	1	1	76	32	49	32	29	21	15	17	US: 1,326,000	RIAA: Platinum; BPI: Silver; RMNZ: Gold
Fantasy Ride	Released: May 3, 2009; Label: LaFace; Formats: CD, digital download	3	2	39	22	34	77	10	—	13	9	US: 206,000	
Basic Instinct	Released: December 10, 2010; Label: LaFace, Jive; Formats: CD, digital download	44	11	—	—	—	—	—	—	83	— (Note: Basic Instinct did not enter the UK Albums Chart, but did peak at number 30 on the UK R&B Albums Chart and number 61 on the UK Album Downloads Chart.)	US: 116,000	BPI: Gold
Ciara	Released: July 5, 2013; Label: Epic; Formats: CD, digital download	2	2	35	21	163	—	—	—	63	42	US: 208,000	
Jackie	Released: May 4, 2015; Label: Epic; Formats: CD, digital download	17	2	53	—	—	—	—	—	—	46		
Beauty Marks	Released: May 10, 2019; Label: Beauty Marks; Formats: CD, digital download	87	48	— (Note: Beauty Marks did not enter the ARIA Albums Chart, but peaked at number 28 on the ARIA Digital Album Chart.)	—	—	—	—	—	—	— (Note: Beauty Marks did not enter the UK Albums Chart, but did peak at number ten on the UK R&B Albums Chart and number 40 on the UK Album Downloads Chart.)		
CiCi	Released: August 22, 2025; Label: Beauty Marks; Formats: CD, digital download, LP, streaming	—	—	—	—	—	—	—	—	—	—		
"—" denotes a recording that did not chart or was not released in that territory.

=== Compilation albums ===
List of compilation albums
Title	Album details
Playlist: The Very Best of Ciara	Released: May 29, 2012; Label: LaFace; Formats: CD, digital download
The Collection	Released: October 19, 2012; Label: Camden, Sony Music; Formats: CD, digital download; Track listing: 1. Goodies (featuring Petey Pablo); 2. Like a Surgeon; 3. Love Sex Magic (featuring Justin Timberlake) (Jason Nevins Sex Club Radio Mix); 4. Keep Dancin' On Me; 5. Promise; 6. Heavy Rotation; 7. Gimmie Dat (Slow Bass Remix); 8. Speechless; 9. Bang It Up; 10. Pick Up the Phone; 11. The Title; 12. Turn It Up (featuring Usher); 13. Yeah I Know; 14. Hotline; 15. And I 16. Turntables (featuring Chris Brown); 17. Like a Boy (Jonathan Peters Deeper Mix 1 Club)

== Extended plays ==
List of extended plays
Title	EP details	Peak chart positions	
Title	EP details	US Cur.	UK DL
CiCi	Released: August 18, 2023; Label: Beauty Marks; Formats: Streaming, digital download	90	42

== Singles ==
=== As lead artist ===
==== 2000s ====
List of singles as lead artist, with selected chart positions and certifications, showing year released and album name
Title	Year	Peak chart positions										Certifications	Album
Title	Year	US	US R&B/ HH	AUS	CAN	FRA	GER	IRL	NZ	SWI	UK	Certifications	Album
"Goodies" (featuring Petey Pablo)	2004	1	1	19	— (Note: "Goodies" did not enter the Canadian Singles Chart, but peaked at number seven on the Canada CHR/Pop Top 30 chart.)	27	10	4	10	10	1	RIAA: 4× Platinum; RIAA: Platinum (Mastertone); BPI: Gold; RMNZ: Platinum	Goodies
"1, 2 Step" (featuring Missy Elliott)	2004	2	4	2	— (Note: "1, 2 Step" did not enter the Canadian Singles Chart, but peaked at number one on the Canada CHR/Pop Top 30 chart.)	31	7	3	2	5	3	RIAA: 7× Platinum; RIAA: Platinum (Mastertone); ARIA: Platinum; BPI: Platinum; BVMI: Gold; MC: Gold; RMNZ: 4× Platinum	Goodies
"Oh" (featuring Ludacris)	2005	2	2	7	— (Note: "Oh" did not enter the Canadian Singles Chart, but peaked at number four on the Canada CHR/Pop Top 30 chart.)	48	7	7	5	11	4	RIAA: 2× Platinum; RIAA: Platinum (Mastertone); ARIA: Gold; BPI: Silver; RMNZ: Platinum	Goodies
"And I"	2005	96	27	—	—	—	—	—	—	—	—	RIAA: Platinum	Goodies
"Get Up" (featuring Chamillionaire)	2006	7	10	—	— (Note: "Get Up" did not enter the Canadian Singles Chart, but peaked at number 24 on the Canada CHR/Top 40 chart.)	—	29	—	5	17	189	RIAA: Platinum; BPI: Silver; RMNZ: Gold	Ciara: The Evolution
"Promise"	2006	11	1	—	—	—	—	—	—	—	—	RIAA: Platinum; RIAA: Platinum (Mastertone)	Ciara: The Evolution
"Like a Boy"	2007	19	6	—	— (Note: "Like a Boy" did not enter the Canadian Singles Chart, but peaked at number 37 on the Canada CHR/Top 40 chart.)	20	29	11	29	16	16	RIAA: Platinum; RIAA: Gold (Mastertone); BPI: Silver; RMNZ: Gold	Ciara: The Evolution
"Can't Leave 'em Alone" (featuring 50 Cent)	2007	40	10	—	—	—	44	—	4	67	109	RIAA: Gold (Mastertone); RMNZ: Platinum	Ciara: The Evolution
"Go Girl" (Note: "Go Girl" was originally intended to be the lead single from Ciara's third studio album, Fantasy Ride (2009), but was later cut from the tracklist, only appearing as a bonus track on the Japanese edition of the album) (featuring T-Pain)	2008	78	26	—	—	—	—	—	—	—	—		Non-album single
"Never Ever" (featuring Young Jeezy)	2009	66	9	—	—	—	—	—	—	—	—	RIAA: Gold	Fantasy Ride
"Love Sex Magic" (featuring Justin Timberlake)	2009	10	83	5	6	8	7	4	6	11	5	RIAA: Platinum; ARIA: Platinum; BPI: Gold; RMNZ: Gold	Fantasy Ride
"Work" (featuring Missy Elliott)	2009	—	—	66	—	—	—	31	—	—	52		Fantasy Ride
"—" denotes a recording that did not chart or was not released in that territory.

==== 2010s ====
List of singles as lead artist, with selected chart positions and certifications, showing year released and album name
Title	Year	Peak chart positions							Certifications	Album
Title	Year	US	US R&B/ HH	AUS	CAN	FRA	NZ Hot	UK	Certifications	Album
"Ride" (featuring Ludacris)	2010	42	3	75	—	—	—	75	RIAA: Platinum; RMNZ: Gold	Basic Instinct
"Speechless"	2010	—	74	—	—	—	—	—		Basic Instinct
"Gimmie Dat"	2010	— (Note: "Gimmie Dat" did not enter the Billboard Hot 100, but peaked at number 16 on the Bubbling Under Hot 100 Singles chart.)	63	—	—	—	—	111		Basic Instinct
"Sorry"	2012	— (Note: "Sorry" did not enter the Billboard Hot 100, but peaked at number 22 on the Bubbling Under Hot 100 Singles chart.)	42	—	—	—	—	173		Non-album singles
"Got Me Good"	2012	—	—	—	—	—	—	—		Non-album singles
"Body Party"	2013	22	6	—	—	—	—	174	RIAA: 2× Platinum; BPI: Silver; RMNZ: Platinum	Ciara
"I'm Out" (featuring Nicki Minaj)	2013	44	13	41	86	159	—	54	RIAA: Gold	Ciara
"Overdose"	2013	—	— (Note: "Overdose" did not enter the Hot R&B/Hip-Hop Songs chart, but peaked at number 33 on the Mainstream R&B/Hip-Hop Airplay chart.)	—	—	—	—	—		Ciara
"I Bet"	2015	43	15	—	95	—	—	56	RIAA: Platinum; BPI: Silver; RMNZ: Platinum	Jackie
"Dance like We're Making Love"	2015	100	28	—	83	199	—	—		Jackie
"Level Up"	2018	59	23	—	—	88	7	— (Note: "Level Up" did not enter the UK Singles Chart, but peaked at number 79 on the UK Singles Downloads Chart.)	RIAA: 2× Platinum; BPI: Silver; RMNZ: Platinum; SNEP: Gold	Beauty Marks
"Freak Me" (featuring Tekno)	2018	—	— (Note: "Freak Me" did not enter the Hot R&B/Hip-Hop Songs chart, but peaked at number 22 on the R&B/Hip-Hop Digital Songs chart.)	—	—	— (Note: "Freak Me" did not enter the France Top Singles, but peaked at number 134 on the France Downloads chart.)	—	—		Beauty Marks
"Dose"	2018	—	— (Note: "Dose" did not enter the Hot R&B/Hip-Hop Songs chart, but peaked at number 7 on the R&B Digital Song Sales chart.)	—	—	—	—	—		Beauty Marks
"Greatest Love"	2019	—	— (Note: "Greatest Love" did not enter the Hot R&B/Hip-Hop Songs chart, but peaked at number 21 on the R&B Digital Song Sales chart.)	—	—	—	—	—		Beauty Marks
"Thinkin Bout You"	2019	—	— (Note: "Thinkin Bout You" did not enter the Hot R&B/Hip-Hop Songs chart, but peaked at number 21 on the R&B/Hip-Hop Digital Song Sales chart.)	—	—	— (Note: "Thinkin Bout You" did not enter the France Top Singles, but peaked at number 193 on the France Downloads chart.)	—	—		Beauty Marks
"Evapora" (with Iza and Major Lazer)	2019	— (Note: "Evapora" did not enter the Billboard Hot 100, but peaked at number 11 on the World Digital Song Sales chart.)	—	—	—	—	—	—		As Melhores de IZA
"Melanin" (featuring Lupita Nyong'o, Ester Dean, City Girls, and La La)	2019	—	—	—	—	—	—	—		Non-album single
"—" denotes a recording that did not chart or was not released in that territory.

==== 2020s ====
List of singles as lead artist, with selected chart positions and certifications, showing year released and album name
Title	Year	Peak chart positions					Certifications	Album
Title	Year	US Bub	US R&B/ HH	US R&B	NZ Hot	UK DL	Certifications	Album
"Rooted" (featuring Ester Dean)	2020	—	—	— (Note: "Rooted" did not enter the Hot R&B Songs chart, but peaked at number 14 on the R&B Digital Song Sales chart.)	—	—		Non-album singles
"Jump" (featuring Coast Contra)	2022	—	— (Note: "Jump" did not enter the Hot R&B/Hip-Hop Songs chart, but peaked at number 12 on the R&B/Hip-Hop Digital Songs chart.)	— (Note: "Jump" did not enter the Hot R&B Songs chart, but peaked at number 4 on the R&B Digital Song Sales chart.)	—	—		Non-album singles
"Better Thangs" (featuring Summer Walker)	2022	—	— (Note: "Better Thangs" did not enter the Hot R&B/Hip-Hop Songs chart, but peaked at number 35 on the R&B/Hip-Hop Airplay chart and at number 13 on the Adult R&B Songs chart.)	—	—			Non-album singles
"Da Girls"	2023	—	— (Note: "Da Girls" did not enter the Hot R&B/Hip-Hop Songs chart, but peaked at number 20 on the R&B/Hip-Hop Digital Songs chart.)	— (Note: "Da Girls" did not enter the Hot R&B Songs chart, but peaked at number 12 on the R&B Digital Song Sales chart.)	—	—		Non-album singles
"Slow" (with Jackson Wang)	2023	—	—	—	—	—		Non-album singles
"Get Loose" (with Agnez Mo)	2023	—	—	—	—	—		Non-album singles
"How We Roll" (with Chris Brown)	2023	5	34	7	2	21	RIAA: Gold; RMNZ: Gold	CiCi (Note: "How We Roll" and "Forever" were released from the CiCi extended play (2023), while "Run It Up", "Wassup" (first as non-album singles) and "Ecstasy" were released from the full-length album, CiCi (2025), on which the aforementioned releases were also included.)
"Forever" (featuring Lil Baby)	2023	—	— (Note: "Forever" did not enter the Hot R&B/Hip-Hop Songs chart, but peaked at number 21 on the R&B/Hip-Hop Digital Songs chart.)	21	—	—		CiCi
"Fantasy" (with Keys N Krates)	2023	—	—	—	—	—		In: Tension
"Run It Up" (featuring BossMan Dlow)	2024	—	—	—	—	—		CiCi
"Wassup" (with Busta Rhymes)	2024	—	—	—	—	—		CiCi
"Ecstasy"	2025	—	— (Note: "Ecstasy" did not enter the Hot R&B/Hip-Hop Songs chart, but peaked at number 39 on the R&B/Hip-Hop Airplay chart.)	10	—	—		CiCi
"So & So" (with Flex)	2025	—	—	—	—	—		Non-album singles
"Low" (featuring Diamond Platnumz)	2025	—	— (Note: "Low" did not enter the Hot R&B/Hip-Hop Songs chart, but peaked at number 19 on the R&B/Hip-Hop Airplay chart.)	—	—	—		CiCi (deluxe edition)
"Yes"	2026	—	—	—	—	—		Non-album single
"—" denotes a recording that did not chart or was not released in that territory.

=== As featured artist ===
List of singles as featured performer, with selected chart positions and certifications, showing year released and album name
Title	Year	Peak chart positions										Certifications	Album
Title	Year	US	US R&B/ HH	AUS	CAN	FRA	GER	IRL	NZ	SWI	UK	Certifications	Album
"Lose Control" (Missy Elliott featuring Ciara and Fatman Scoop)	2005	3	6	7	— (Note: "Lose Control" did not enter the Canadian Singles Chart, but peaked at number 12 on the Canada CHR/Pop Top 30 chart.)	—	25	16	2	21	7	RIAA: 3× Platinum; ARIA: Gold; BPI: Gold; RMNZ: Platinum	The Cookbook
"Like You" (Bow Wow featuring Ciara)	2005	3	1	16	— (Note: "Like You" did not enter the Canadian Singles Chart, but peaked at number 12 on the Canada CHR/Pop Top 30 chart.)	—	39	4	—	72	17	RIAA: Platinum; BPI: Silver; RMNZ: 2× Platinum	Wanted
"So What" (Field Mob featuring Ciara)	2006	10	4	40	— (Note: "So What" did not enter the Canadian Singles Chart, but peaked at number 21 on the Canada CHR/Top 40 chart.)	—	—	—	—	—	56	RMNZ: Gold	Light Poles and Pine Trees
"Promise Ring" (Tiffany Evans featuring Ciara)	2007	— (Note: "Promise Ring" did not enter the Billboard Hot 100, but peaked at number 1 on the Bubbling Under Hot 100 Singles chart.)	66	—	—	—	—	—	—	—	—		Tiffany Evans
"Stepped on My J'z" (Nelly featuring Ciara and Jermaine Dupri)	2008	90	— (Note: "Stepped on My J'z" did not enter the Hot R&B/Hip-Hop Songs chart, but peaked at number 4 on the Bubbling Under R&B/Hip-Hop Singles chart.)	—	—	—	—	—	—	—	—		Brass Knuckles
"Just Stand Up!" (with Artists Stand Up to Cancer)	2008	11	57	39	10	—	—	11	19	—	26		Non-album single
"Takin' Back My Love" (Note: Two single versions of "Takin' Back My Love" were released: the first features Ciara, and the second features Sarah Connor.) (Enrique Iglesias featuring Ciara)	2009	— (Note: "Takin' Back My Love" did not enter the Billboard Hot 100, but peaked at number 4 on the Dance Club Songs chart.)	—	—	—	2	9	7	—	23	12	BPI: Silver	Greatest Hits
"Get Up" (R3hab with Ciara)	2016	—	—	—	—	—	—	—	—	—	—		Non-album single
"Nails, Hair, Hips, Heels" (Todrick Hall featuring Ciara)	2019	—	—	—	—	—	—	—	—	—	—		Haus Party, Pt. 2
"The Git Up Remix" (Blanco Brown featuring Ciara)	2019	—	—	—	—	—	—	—	—	—	—		Non-album single
"In Spite of Me" (Tasha Cobbs Leonard featuring Ciara)	2020	— (Note: "In Spite of Me" did not enter the Billboard Hot 100, but peaked at number 1 on the Gospel Airplay chart and number 7 on the Hot Gospel Songs chart.)	—	—	—	—	—	—	—	—	—		Royalty: Live at the Ryman
"Y'all Life" (Walker Hayes featuring Ciara)	2022	—	—	—	—	—	—	—	—	—	—		Non-album singles
"Left Right Remixx" (XG featuring Ciara & Jackson Wang)	2023	—	—	—	—	—	—	—	—	—	—		Non-album singles
"SK8" (JID featuring Ciara and EarthGang)	2025	—	— (Note: "SK8" did not enter the Hot R&B/Hip-Hop Songs chart, but peaked at number 30 on the R&B/Hip-Hop Airplay chart.)	—	—	—	—	—	— (Note: "SK8" did not enter the NZ Singles Chart but peaked at number 21 on the NZ Hot Singles Chart.)	—	—		God Does Like Ugly
"—" denotes a recording that did not chart or was not released in that territory.

=== Promotional singles ===
List of promotional singles, with selected details
Title	Year	Peak chart position	Album
Title	Year	US R&B/ HH	Album
"Feedback" (So So Def Remix) (Janet Jackson featuring Busta Rhymes, Ciara and Fabolous)	2008	—	Non-album singles
"My Girl" (Remix) (Mindless Behavior featuring Ciara, Tyga and Lil Twist)	2011	—	Non-album singles
"Sweat" (featuring 2 Chainz)	2012	86	Non-album singles
"Paint It, Black"	2015	— (Note: "Paint It, Black" did not enter the Hot R&B/Hip-Hop Songs, but peaked at number 21 on the R&B Digital Songs chart.)	The Last Witch Hunter
"Treat" (with Rice Krispies Treats)	2022	—	Non-album single
"This Right Here" (featuring Latto and Jazze Pha)	2025	—	CiCi
"Yes (Unfinished Business)" (featuring Akeem Ali)	2026	—	Yes Pack
"Yes (ATL)" (featuring Young Dro)	2026	—	Yes Pack
"—" denotes a recording that did not chart.

== Other charted songs ==
List of other charted songs, with selected chart positions, showing year released and album name
Title	Year	Peak chart positions								Album
Title	Year	US Bub	US R&B/ HH	US R&B/ HH Dig.	CAN	NZ Urban	KOR (Int.)	UK	UK R&B	Album
"That's Right" (featuring Lil Jon)	2008	—	—	—	—	37	—	—	—	Ciara: The Evolution
"Ciara to the Stage"	2009	4	—	—	—	—	—	—	—	Fantasy Ride
"Turntables" (featuring Chris Brown)	2009	—	—	—	—	—	—	80	22	Fantasy Ride
"I'm On"	2009	—	—	—	79	—	—	—	—	Fantasy Ride
"Like a Surgeon"	2009	—	59	—	—	—	—	—	—	Fantasy Ride
"Thug Style"	2010	2	—	—	—	—	—	—	—	Goodies
"Pretty Girl Swag"	2010	—	90	—	—	—	—	—	—	—N/a
"We Can Get It On" (Yo Gotti featuring Ciara)	2010	—	40	—	—	—	—	—	—	Cocaine Musik 5: White Friday
"Turn It Up" (featuring Usher)	2010	—	—	49	—	—	3	—	—	Basic Instinct
"I'm Legit" (Nicki Minaj featuring Ciara)	2012	—	40	15	—	—	—	97	14	Pink Friday: Roman Reloaded – The Re-Up
"Sophomore"	2013	—	—	—	—	—	161	—	—	Ciara
"Keep On Lookin'"	2013	—	—	—	—	—	190	—	—	Ciara
"Read My Lips"	2013	—	—	—	—	—	5	—	—	Ciara
"Where You Go" (featuring Future)	2013	—	—	—	—	—	171	—	—	Ciara
"Super Turnt Up"	2013	—	—	—	—	—	126	—	—	Ciara
"DUI"	2013	—	—	—	—	—	172	—	—	Ciara
"Livin' It Up" (featuring Nicki Minaj)	2013	—	—	—	—	—	2	—	—	Ciara
"Beauty Marks"	2019	—	—	— (Note: "Beauty Marks" did not enter the R&B/Hip-Hop Digital Songs chart, but peaked at number 22 on the R&B Digital Song Sales chart.)	—	—	—	—	—	Beauty Marks
"Ciara's Prayer" (with Summer Walker)	2021	1	49	—	—	—	—	—	—	Still Over It
"Dance with Me" (featuring Tyga)	2025	—	—	10	—	—	—	—	—	CiCi (album)
"—" denotes a recording that did not chart or was not released in that territory.

== Guest appearances ==
List of non-single guest appearances, with other performing artists, showing year released and album name
Title	Year	Other performer(s)	Album
"I Wish"	2004	ATL	The ATL Project
"It's Us"	2004	ATL	The ATL Project
"Roll wit' You"	2005	None	Coach Carter soundtrack
"If I Hit" (Remix)	2005	112, T.I.	None
"Wanna Move"	2006	Diddy, Big Boi, Scar	Press Play
"King and Queen"	2007	T.I.	None
"Goodbye, My Dear"	2007	T.I.	None
"Click Flash"	2008	None	Sex and the City: Volume 2
"Blowing Up"	2008	T-Pain	Three Ringz
"How Low" (Remix)	2010	Ludacris, Pitbull	Battle of the Sexes
"We Can Get It On"	2010	Yo Gotti	Cocaine Musik 5: White Friday
"Another Girl"	2011	Jacques Greene	Non-album single
"Turn on the Lights" (Remix)	2012	Future	None
"I'm Legit"	2012	Nicki Minaj	Pink Friday: Roman Reloaded – The Re-Up
"Wake Up No Make Up"	2013	Mike Will Made It	Been Trill
"Ciara's Prayer"	2021	Summer Walker	Still Over It
"On and On"	2021	Maverick City Music, Harolddd, Rapsody	Jubilee: Juneteenth Edition
"The Color Purple"	2023	Fantasia, Danielle Brooks, Taraji P. Henson, Corey Hawkins, Colman Domingo, The Color Purple ensemble	The Color Purple (Original Motion Picture Soundtrack)
“Get Loose”	2023	AGNEZ MO	None
"Good 2 You"	2024	Latto	Sugar Honey Iced Tea
"Sk8"	2025	JID	God Does Like Ugly

== Songwriting credits ==
List of non-feature songwriting credits, showing artist written for, year released and album name
Title	Year	Performer	Album
"10,000 Times"	2001	Blu Cantrell	So Blu
"Got Me Waiting"	2004	Fantasia	Free Yourself
"Letters"	2023	Monica	Trenches
