= Ciara videography =

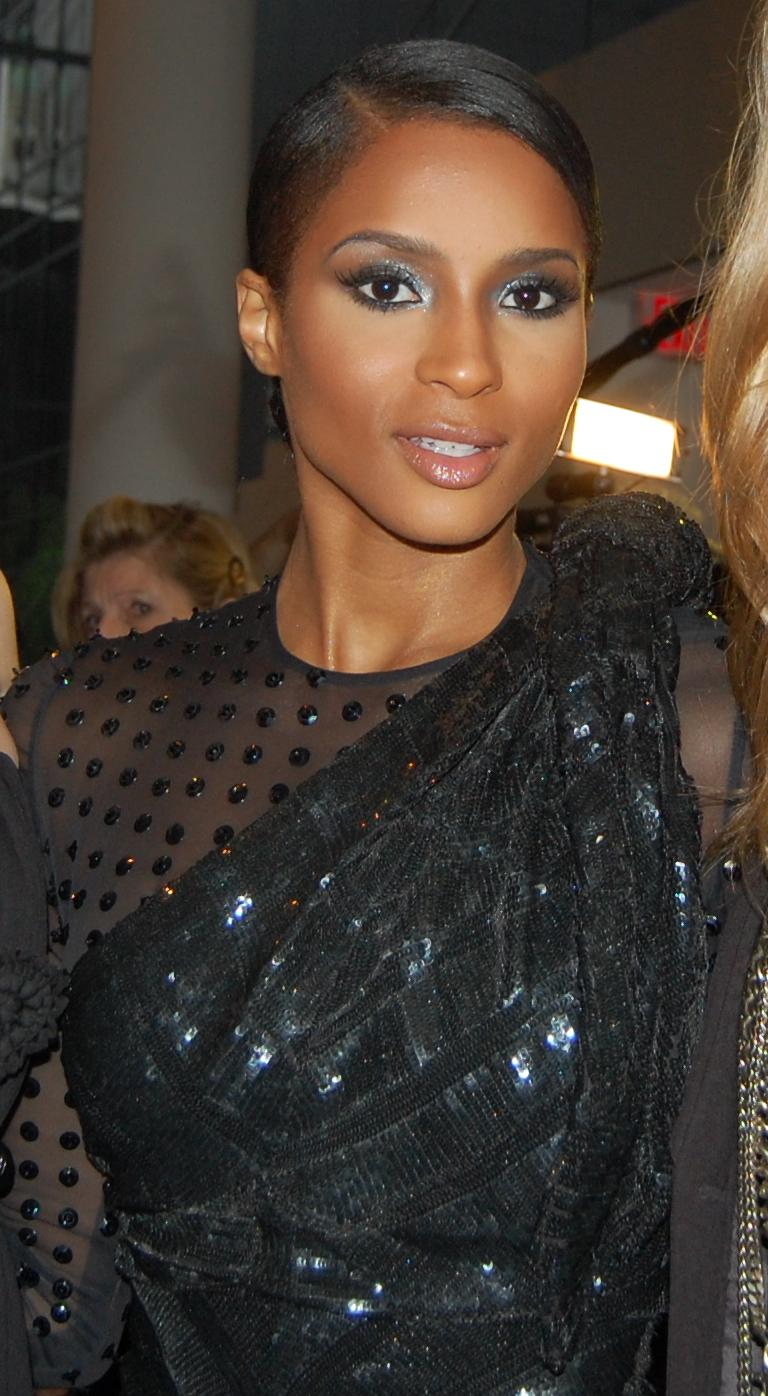
Ciara in 2007

American singer Ciara has appeared in numerous music videos and films. Her videography includes twenty two music videos, six guest appearances in other artists' videos as a featured artist, two guest appearances in other artists videos and three film appearances.

Ciara's debut studio album, Goodies, was released in September 2004 and spawned the number-one hit "Goodies" and top-ten hits, "1, 2 Step" and "Oh". It was followed by the DVD/EP, Goodies: The Videos & More, which was certified Platinum by the RIAA and included the videos for its three hit singles and behind-the scenes content. In 2005, Ciara was featured on rapper, Missy Elliott's top-ten hit, "Lose Control"; the video of which received the awards for Best Short Form Music Video at the 48th Grammy Awards (2006) and Best Dance Video and Best Hip-Hop Video at the 2005 MTV Video Music Awards. Ciara's second studio album, Ciara: The Evolution, and third studio album, Fantasy Ride, were released in December 2006 and May 2009, respectively. Her fourth album, Basic Instinct, was released in December 2010 and spawned the single, "Ride'; its music video received the award for Best Dance Performance at the 2010 Soul Train Music Awards and was banned by BET and UK music channels for its sexual dances. The singer's self-titled fifth studio album, Ciara was her first release on Epic Records and featured the single, "Body Party", whose music video received the award for Best Dance Performance at the 2013 Soul Train Music Awards. It was followed by her sixth LP, Jackie in 2015.

Ciara made her first film appearance in 2006, in the film All You've Got, she made her second appearance as a struggling singer in the 2012 film Mama, I Want to Sing!. Ciara made her latest film appearance in That's My Boy alongside Adam Sandler.

== Video albums ==
List of video albums, with selected chart positions and certifications
Title	Album details	Peak chart positions	Certifications
Title	Album details	US Video	Certifications
Goodies: The Videos & More	Released: June 7, 2005 (US); Label: LaFace; Formats: DVD	2	RIAA: Platinum

== Music videos ==
=== As lead artist ===
List of music videos as lead artist, with other performers, directors, and showing year released
Title	Year	Other performer(s)	Director(s)	Ref.
"Goodies"	2004	Petey Pablo	Benny Boom	
"1, 2 Step"	2004	Missy Elliott	Benny Boom	
"Oh"	2005	Ludacris	Fat Cats	
"And I"	2005	—N/a	Fat Cats	
"Get Up"	2006	Chamillionaire	Joseph Kahn	
"Promise"	2006	—N/a	Diane Martel	
"Like a Boy"	2007	—N/a	Diane Martel	
"Can't Leave 'em Alone"	2007	50 Cent	Fat Cats	
"That's Right"	2007	Lil Jon	Fat Cats	
"Go Girl"	2008	T-Pain	Melina	
"Never Ever"	2009	Young Jeezy	Chris Robinson	
"Love Sex Magic"	2009	Justin Timberlake	Diane Martel	
"Work"	2009	Missy Elliott	Melina	
"Basic Instinct (U Got Me)"	2010	—N/a	Phil the God	
"Ride"	2010	Ludacris	Diane Martel	
"Speechless"	2010	—N/a	Colin Tilley	
"Gimmie Dat"	2010	—N/a	Melina	
"Sorry"	2012	—N/a	Christopher Sims	
"Got Me Good"	2012	—N/a	Joseph Kahn	
"Body Party"	2013	—N/a	Director X	
"I'm Out"	2013	Nicki Minaj	Hannah Lux Davis	
"Livin' It Up"	2013	—N/a	Hannah Lux Davis	
"DUI"	2013	—N/a	Hannah Lux Davis	
"Read My Lips"	2013	—N/a	Hannah Lux Davis	
"Sophomore"	2013	—N/a	Hannah Lux Davis	
"Keep On Lookin'"	2013	—N/a	Hannah Lux Davis	
"Super Turnt Up"	2013	—N/a	Hannah Lux Davis	
"I Bet"	2015	—N/a	Hannah Lux Davis	
"I Got You"	2015	—N/a	Jordan Taylor Wright	
"Dance Like We're Making Love"	2015	—N/a	Dave Meyers	
"Level Up"	2018	—N/a	Parris Goebel	
"Freak Me"	2018	Tekno	Tim Milgram	
"Dose"	2018	—N/a	Ciara, Jamaica Craft, Diane Martel	
"Dose" (Version 2)	2018	—N/a	Timothee Alex, Ciara, Jamaica Craft	
"Greatest Love"	2019	—N/a	Sasha Samsonova	
"Thinkin Bout You"	2019	—N/a	Hannah Lux Davis	
"Beauty Marks"	2019	—N/a	Hannah Lux Davis	
"Set"	2019	—N/a	—N/a	
"Evapora"	2019	Iza, Major Lazer	Felipe Sassi	
"Rooted"	2020	Ester Dean	Annie Bercy	
"Jump"	2022	Coast Contra	Dave Meyers, Ciara, Jamaica Craft	
"Better Thangs"	2022	Summer Walker	Mia Barnes	
"Da Girls"	2023	—N/a	Sara Lacombe	
"Da Girls (Girls Mix)"	2023	Lola Brooke, Lady London	Sara Lacombe	
"How We Roll"	2023	Chris Brown	Christian Breslauer	
"Forever"	2023	Lil Baby	Andre Jones, Taj Stansberry	
"Ecstasy"	2025	—N/a	Diane Martel	
"Dance with Me"	2025	Tyga	Kat Webber	
"Low"	2025	Diamond Platnumz	Sammy Rawal	

=== As featured artist ===
List of music videos as lead artist, with other performers, directors, and showing year released
Title	Year	Other performer(s)	Director(s)	Ref.
"Lose Control"	2005	Missy Elliott, Fat Man Scoop	Dave Meyers, Missy Elliott	
"Like You"	2005	Bow Wow	Bryan Barber	
"So What"	2006	Field Mob	Jessy Terrero	
"Promise Ring"	2007	Tiffany Evans	Fat Cats	
"Stepped on My J'z"	2008	Nelly, Jermaine Dupri	Benny Boom	
"Takin' Back My Love"	2009	Enrique Iglesias	Ray Kay	
"My Girl" (Remix)	2011	Mindless Behavior, Tyga, Lil Twist	Ryan Pallota	
"Slow"	2023	Jackson Wang	Daniel "Cloud" Campos	
"Get Loose"	2023	Agnez Mo	Loris Russier	

=== Guest appearances ===
Year	Song	Artist
2004	"Calling All Girls"	ATL
2008	"Party People"	Nelly featuring Fergie
2010	"Lil Freak"	Usher featuring Nicki Minaj
2016	"M.I.L.F. $"	Fergie
2019	"You Need to Calm Down"	Taylor Swift

== Filmography ==
Film	Year	Director	Character	Description
All You've Got	2006	Neema Barnette	Becca Watley	Television film
Mama, I Want to Sing!	2012	Charles Randolph-Wright	Amara Winter	Straight-to-DVD film. Amara becomes a huge star in her own right, taking the R&B world by storm.
That's My Boy	2012	Sean Anders	Brie	Theatrical debut. A bartender and Donny's friend, Todd's secondary love interest.
Justin Bieber: The New Me	2021	Lucy Ciara McCutcheon	Herself	Documentary film
The Color Purple	2023	Blitz Bazawule	Nettie	
The Devil Wears Prada 2	2026	David Frankel	Herself	

== Television ==
Year	Title	Role	Notes
2004	Showtime at the Apollo	Herself	Episode: "Ciara with Petey Pablo/I-20 feat. Ludacris"
2004	Steve Harvey's Big Time Challenge	Herself	Episode: "Episode #2.10"
2005	Top of the Pops	Herself	Recurring Guest
2005	Punk'd	Herself	Episode: "Episode #4.7"
2005	Soul Train	Herself	Episode: "Ciara/T.I./P$C"
2005	My Super Sweet 16	Herself	Episode: "Amanda"
2005–09	Access Granted	Herself	Recurring Guest
2006	In the Mix	Herself	Episode: "Word Cup, And-1, ASCAP and Superman Returns..."
2006	So You Think You Can Dance	Herself	Episode: "Finale"
2009	America's Next Top Model	Herself	Episode: "Take Me to the Photo Shoot"
2009	E.S.L.	Herself	Episode: "Makano, Ciara Y MáS!"
2009	Saturday Night Live	Herself	Episode: "Justin Timberlake/Ciara"
2009	Sound	Herself	Episode: "Episode #3.37"
2011	Kourtney and Kim Take New York	Herself	Episode: "Dream A Little Dream"
2011	Hellcats	Herself	Episode: "Land of 1,000 Dances"
2011	Keeping Up with the Kardashians	Herself	Episode: "Kim's Fairytale Wedding: A Kardashian Event - Part 2"
2013	The Game	Herself	Recurring Cast: Season 6
2015	I Can Do That	Herself	Episode: "Episode #1.1" & "#1.3"
2015	Project Runway	Herself/Guest Judge	Episode: "Make It Sell"
2015	Nicky, Ricky, Dicky & Dawn	Herself	Episode: "Go Hollywood: Part 1 & 2"
2015–16	Hollywood Game Night	Herself/Celebrity Player	Episode: "Episode #3.3" & "#4.7"
2015–16	Live with Kelly and Mark	Herself/Guest Co-Host	Recurring Guest Co-Host
2016	Billboard Music Awards	Herself/Co-Host	Main Co-Host
2016	Love Advent	Herself	Episode: "Ciara"
2017	So Cosmo	Herself	Episode: "Vol. 1, No. 3: Before Heads Roll"
2018	RuPaul's Drag Race All Stars	Herself/Guest Judge	Episode: "Super Girl Groups, Henny"
2018–23	Dick Clark's New Year's Rockin' Eve	Herself/Co-Host	Main Co-Host
2019	Song Association	Herself	Episode: "Ciara"
2019	All That	Herself	Recurring Guest
2019	American Music Awards	Herself/Host	Main Host
2019–20	America's Most Musical Family	Herself/Judge	Main Judge
2021	Cardi Tries	Herself	Episode: "Cardi Tries Thanksgiving Dinner"
2022	Janet Jackson	Herself	Episode: "Part 3 & 4"
2022	Billboard Women in Music	Herself/Host	Main Host
2022	Soul of a Nation	Herself	Episode: "Sound of Freedom – A Juneteenth Celebration"
2022	Carpool Karaoke	Herself	Episode: "Ciara & Russell Wilson"
2022	Earnin' It	Herself/Narrator	Main Narrator
2024	Finding Your Roots	Herself	Episode: "Born to Sing"
2024	American Idol	Herself	Episode: "Adele Night"
