= CiCi (album) =

- Standard edition cover

Studio album by Ciara
- Released: August 22, 2025
- Length: 43:12
- Label: Beauty Marks
- Producers: Black Man Chant; Blaq Tuxedo; Carrington Brown; Tommy (TBHITS) Brown; Jasper Cameron; Ciara; Deli Banger; Ebenezer Fabiyi; Flo Beats; Courtlin Jabrae; Jaydot; Lucky Jones; Kevo; Leather Jacket; Mr Kamera; Andy D. Park; Tommy Parker; Precision Productions; J.R. Rotem; Travis Sayles; Shine; Tiggi; Theron Thomas; Dewain Whitmore Jr.

Ciara chronology
CiCi (2023)	CiCi (2025)

Singles from CiCi
- 1. "Ecstasy" Released: April 4, 2025

Singles from CiCi (deluxe edition)
- 1. "Low" Released: August 25, 2025

CiCi is the eighth studio album by American singer Ciara. It was released on August 22, 2025, by Beauty Marks Entertainment. It followed her seventh studio album, Beauty Marks (2019), and was supported by the release of the lead single, "Ecstasy". Developed as an extension of her 2023 extended play of the same title, it features all of the songs from the previous release, including previously released singles "How We Roll" and "Forever"; standalone releases "Wassup" and "Run It Up" are also included. The album features collaborations with Big Freedia, BossMan Dlow, Chris Brown, Diamond Platnumz, Latto, Lil Baby, Moliy, Normani, Oxlade, Jazze Pha, Busta Rhymes, Teyana Taylor, and Tyga.

== Background and conception ==
In 2017, Ciara founded her own independent label, Beauty Marks Entertainment, following what she described as one of the "most disappointing" meetings with her former label's new CEO. In June 2022, it was reported she signed a joint-venture contract between Republic and Uptown Records, in collaboration with her label. Under the agreement, the singles "Jump", featuring Coast Contra, and "Better Thangs", featuring Summer Walker, were released in July and September 2022, respectively; however, with the release of "Da Girls" in March 2023, copyright was credited solely through Beauty Marks. In August 2023, the extended play CiCi was released and featured the new single "How We Roll" with Chris Brown. In 2024, Ciara, along with Busta Rhymes, joined long-time collaborator Missy Elliott's Out of This World Tour. That same year, "Run It Up" and "Wassup" were released in August and September, respectively. In April 2025, it was announced an extension of the 2023 extended play would release on July 11 of the same year, featuring all previously included songs, the 2024 releases, and five brand-new songs, including "Ecstasy".

In the May 2025 issue of L'Officiel USA, Ciara discussed her career, her family, and all about the CiCi album; she revealed that she had collaborated once again with Jazze Pha, and there would be collaborations with rappers Tyga and Latto. She stated, "With this project, I want to say thank you to my fans. I've been doing things independently, running my own label, and it has not been the easiest journey by far [...] There are some amazing moments [on the album]—I've always wanted to work with Tyga; the way he rides the beat is so special. Jazze Pha produced a song for me, and we hadn't done a song together since my second album [...] to have Latto join us, it's super A-Town love. There's a bit of a nostalgic undertone that does happen throughout, and also meeting where I am now". In a video interview with the magazine, she expanded saying that the "song of the summer" for her would either be single "Ecstasy" or the Tyga-assisted "Dance with Me".

In a post on Instagram announcing the album and unveiling its album artwork, Ciara stated, "This album right here is my love letter. A celebration of the journey—and more importantly, a thank you to you, my Day 1s and Day 21s." In conclusion, she teased the era was "just getting started" and revealed the album took five years "to build". In June 2025, she announced the album's release had been rescheduled to August 22. Speaking to the Associated Press, she revealed the album took nearly five years to complete, revealing: "I put a lot of blood, sweat, and tears, as they would say, into this project [...] I literally gave birth to two babies while I was making this project, too. So, a lot has happened."

== Artwork, title and composition ==
On May 1, 2025, Elite Daily posted an exclusive interview with Ciara, where she explained the album's title, stating, "That's my nickname my fans have called me since Day 1." Three days later, she shared the album's artwork on her Instagram page. The artwork features the singer standing against an all-red background, wearing a 3D-printed breastplate, with the album's title evenly split on either side of her; in response to the breastplate, she shared, "That's not just a fashion statement. That's my armor. A symbol of the strength I've had to summon, the boundaries I've had to set, and the power I've learned to wear with pride." During an appearance on Keke Palmer's podcast, Baby, This Is Keke Palmer, Ciara revealed the album would feature platform-specific content variations, "creating multiple listening experiences rather than a single unified version". In August 2025, during an episode of Kylie Kelce's podcast Not Gonna Lie, she further revealed the standard edition of the album would be released on August 22 with fourteen tracks, with the deluxe edition following three days later. On November 14, 2025, deluxe editions were updated to include the Moily and Oxlade-assisted "Nice n' Sweet", which was previously a fizy exclusive. The standard edition of the album features Ciara standing against an all-red backdrop; on the deluxe edition, the backdrop is all-blue.

== Promotion ==
"Ecstasy" was released as the album's lead single on April 4, 2025, alongside the Diane Martel-directed music video. During the week of April 13, 2025, it was the second-most added song to U.S. urban contemporary radio. The song garnered positive reviews; it debuted at number 11 on the R&B/Hip-Hop Digital Songs chart and peaked at 39 on R&B/Hip-Hop Airplay. A remix featuring Teyana Taylor and Normani was released on June 6. "This Right Here", featuring Latto and Jazze Pha, was released on July 28, 2025, to celebrate the annual "Ciara Day" in Atlanta, Georgia. A dance video for the previously released "Wassup" was published on August 16, 2025. A music video for the Tyga-assisted "Dance with Me" was released simultaneously with the album. On the R&B/Hip-Hop Digital Songs chart, it debuted at number ten.

On August 29, a music video for the Diamond Platnumz collaboration "Low" was released. It was the second-most added song to U.S. urban contemporary radio the week of September 29, 2025, and reached number 19 on R&B/Hip-Hop Airplay.

Ciara headlined the 2025 edition of Mighty Hoopla on May 31. She appeared on Today as part of their Citi Concert Series on July 11, 2025, performing several songs from her discography, as well as debuting "Drop Your Love". On September 24, 2025, Ciara performed "Low" during the season twenty finale of America's Got Talent. In speaking with Elite Daily, she also expressed her interest in touring, telling the platform, "I'm manifesting a tour coming sooner than later".

== Critical reception ==
Professional ratings
Review scores
Source	Rating
AllMusic	3/5 stars

In a review for AllMusic, Andy Kellman gave the album a three out of five star rating. He further noted that while Ciara played it safe with the album, she "maintains a fine balance between earnest and playful".

== Track listing ==
Standard track listing
No.	Title	Writer(s)	Producer(s)	Length
1.	"Made It"	Chalra Warmley; Ciara Harris; Justin Kent; Kasey Michael Phillips; Theron Thomas; William Hood	Andy D. Park; Ciara; Precision Productions	2:42
2.	"How We Roll" (with Chris Brown)	Warmley; Chris Brown; Christopher John Taylor; Harris; Claudell Monsanto; Phillips; Tatenda Terence Kamera; Theron Thomas; Hood	Ciara; Deli Banger; Mr Kamera; Precision Productions; Theron Thomas	3:20
3.	"Run It Up" (featuring BossMan Dlow)	Harris; Courtlin Jabrae; Devante McCreary; Theron Thomas	Park; Ciara; Jabrae; J. R. Rotem	3:12
4.	"Dance with Me" (featuring Tyga)	Brandon Hamelin; Warmley; Harris; Michael Ray Nguyen-Stevenson; Ryan Ogren; Theron Thomas; Hood	Park; B Ham; Ciara; Ryan OG; Theron Thomas	2:23
5.	"BRB"	Calvin Tarvin; Harris; Kevin Yancey; Yone	Ciara; Kevo; Tiggi	2:28
6.	"Low Key"	Harris; Jonathan Rotem; Jasper Cameron; Theron Thomas	Ciara; Rotem; Cameron	3:30
7.	"Type a Party"	Warmley; Harris; Dwight Kerry Florent; Phillips; Theron Thomas; Hood	Ciara; Flo Beats; Precision Productions; Theron Thomas	3:46
8.	"Ecstasy"	Harris; Jabrae; Theron Thomas	Leather Jackettt; Tommy (TBHITS) Brown	3:59
9.	"Wassup" (with Busta Rhymes)	Andre Clark; Harris; Jabrae; Rotem; Trevor George Smith Jr.	Park; Black Man Chant; Ciara; Jabrae; Rotem	2:52
10.	"Drop Your Love"	Harris; Jabrae; Rotem; Michael Jones; Theron Thomas	Park; Ciara; Jones; Rotem	3:26
11.	"This Right Here" (featuring Latto and Jazze Pha)	Alyssa Stephens; Christopher Bridges; Harris; Jourdin Pauline; Phalon Alexander; Quinton Gray; Shondrae Crawford; Theron Thomas; Hood	Park; Ciara; Jazze Pha; Quin with the Keyz; Theron Thomas	3:10
12.	"2 in Luv"	Adam Duggins; Warmley; Harris; Jhaye Chayenne McKie; Phillips; Maurice Young; Rafe Van Hoy; Theron Thomas; Hood	Ciara; Jaydot; Precision Productions; Theron Thomas	2:58
13.	"Forever" (featuring Lil Baby)	Warmley; Harris; Dominique Armani Jones; Phillips; Theron Thomas; Timothy Thomas; Hood	Ciara; Jaydot; Precision Productions; Theron Thomas	2:55
14.	"Winning" (featuring Big Freedia)	Warmley; Harris; Claudell Mosanto; Phillips; Theron Thomas; Hood	Ciara; Deli Banger; Precision Productions; Theron Thomas	2:31
Total length:				43:12

Deluxe edition track listing
No.	Title	Writer(s)	Producer(s)	Length
15.	"Low" (with Diamond Platnumz)	Charlotte Wilson; Harris; Jabrae; Darius Logan; Dominique Logan; Ebenezer Fabiyi; Magnum Klausen; Naseeb Abdul Juma Isaack	Blaq Tuxedo; Fabiyi; Park^{[v]}; Ciara^{[v]}; Jabrae^{[v]}	3:31
16.	"Nice n' Sweet" (with Moliy and Oxlade)	Christopher Chan; Harris; Jabrae; Ikuforiji Olaitan Abdulrahman; Moliy Ama Montgomery; Kwaku Etwi	Lucky Jones; Shine; Park^{[v]}; Ciara^{[v]}; Jabrae^{[v]}	2:39
17.	"Infinite Imagination"	Harris; Jabrae; Darius Logan; Dewain Whitmore Jr.; Dominique Logan; Eric Zareski	Blaq Tuxedo; Whitmore Jr.; Park^{[v]}; Ciara^{[v]}; Jabrae^{[v]}	3:46
18.	"LMOL"	Park; Harris; Jabrae; Darius Logan; Dominique Logan; Marqueze Parker; Travis Sayles	Park^{[pvp]}; Blaq Tuxedo; Jabrae^{[pvp]}; Leather Jacket; Sayles; Ciara^{[v]}	3:32
19.	"Ecstasy" (remix; with Normani) (featuring Teyana Taylor)	Harris; Jabrae; Theron Thomas	Park; Carrington Brown; Ciara; Jabrae; Leather Jackettt; (TBHITS) Brown; Tommy Parker	3:30
Total length:				60:10

=== Notes ===
- ^{^[v]} signifies a vocal producer
- ^{^[pvp]} signifies a producer and vocal producer
- Sample credits taken from the album's liner notes:
  - "BRB" contains a sample from "Ride Out" by DJ Trans and the Shake Something Crew.
  - "Low Key" contains a sample from "I Wanna Rock" by Uncle Luke.
  - "Wassup" contains a sample from "Moments in Love" by Art of Noise.
  - "Drop Your Love" contains a sample from "Love Come Down" by Evelyn "Champagne" King.
  - "This Right Here" contains a sample from "What's Your Fantasy", as written by Christopher Bridges and Shondrae Crawford, and as performed by Ludacris featuring Shawnna.
  - "2 in Luv" contains a sample from "I'm a Thug", as written by Maurice Young, Adam Duggins and Rafe Van Hoy, and as performed by Trick Daddy.
  - "Forever" contains a sample of "All I Do" by B5.

== Release history ==
Release history
Initial release date	Format	Edition	Label	Ref.
August 22, 2025	CD; music download; LP; music streaming	Standard	Beauty Marks	
August 25, 2025	Music download; music streaming	Deluxe	Beauty Marks	
June 26, 2026	CD; vinyl	Deluxe	Beauty Marks	
