= CiCi (EP) =

EP by Ciara
- Released: August 18, 2023
- Genre: R&B
- Length: 21:26
- Label: Beauty Marks
- Producer: Precision Productions; Deli Banger; Mr Kamera; Flo Beats; Theron Thomas; Ciara Harris

Ciara chronology
Beauty Marks (2019)	CiCi (2023)	CiCi (2025)

Singles from CiCi
- 1. "How We Roll" Released: August 4, 2023; 2. "Forever" Released: August 18, 2023

CiCi is the first extended play (EP) by American singer Ciara, released on August 18, 2023. It was promoted with the release of two singles: "How We Roll", and "Forever", which featured Chris Brown and Lil Baby respectively. In April 2025, Ciara announced that her eighth studio album, also titled CiCi, would be an extension of the EP; the album was released on August 22, 2025.

== Background ==
Ciara's seventh studio album, Beauty Marks, was released on May 10, 2019, through her independent record label, Beauty Marks Entertainment. In July 2022, it was announced that Ciara had signed a new partnership between Beauty Marks Entertainment and major labels, Republic Records and Uptown Records, under which she would release her eighth studio album. Through the joint venture, Ciara released the singles, "Jump" (featuring Coast Contra) and "Better Thangs" (featuring Summer Walker), in July and September 2022. However, her next single, "Da Girls", was released solely through her label in March 2023.

On August 2, 2023, Ciara announced the release of the single, "How We Roll" (with Chris Brown); on August 4, 2023, Ciara announced that she would be releasing the EP CiCi on August 18, with "How We Roll" as its first track. She premiered the tracklist on August 11, 2023, revealing that Lil Baby and Big Freedia would also feature on the EP.

== Composition ==
In an interview with Rated R&B, Ciara shared: "There's always an intentional tone of empowerment in my music [...] I always want to uplift my Queens and take them on my journey with me. There's no better platform to be able to accomplish that than through my music." The album's opening track, "How We Roll", is a collaboration with Chris Brown and "finds the pair expressing their affection for each other over a laidback and groovy beat." The second track, "BRB", is a "nod to Jersey club bounce", featuring "fast-paced rhythm and kick drums"; the song finds Ciara singing about missing her significant other. Apple Music described "Type a Party", "Forever" and "2 in Luv" as traditional R&B and "Low Key" and "Winning" as uptempo.

== Singles ==
On August 4, 2023, Ciara released the single "How We Roll", in collaboration with Chris Brown. A remix, featuring rapper Lil Wayne, was released on November 3, 2023.

On August 18, 2023, Ciara released a music video for "Forever", the EP's second single, featuring Lil Baby. The video was directed by Taj and Dre.

== Commercial performance ==
In the United States, CiCi debuted and peaked at number 90 on the US Top Current Album Sales chart. In the United Kingdom, the EP debuted and peaked at number 42 on the UK Album Downloads Chart, spending one week on that chart.

== Track listing ==
CiCi track listing
No.	Title	Writer(s)	Producer(s)	Length
1.	"How We Roll" (with Chris Brown)	Ciara Harris; Chris Brown; Theron Thomas; Skrrt Skrrt	Precision Productions; Deli Banger; Mr Kamera	3:19
2.	"BRB"	Calvin Lamar Tarvin; Wilson; Kevin Yancey; Yone	Harris; TIGGI; I Am Kevo	2:27
3.	"Low Key"	Harris; J.R. Rotem; Jasper Cameron; Theron Thomas	Harris; Rotem; Cameron	3:29
4.	"Type a Party"	Chalra Warmley; Harris; Dwight Florent; Kasey Phillips; Theron Thomas; William Hood	Theron Thomas; Harris; Flo Beats; Precision Productions	3:45
5.	"Forever" (featuring Lil Baby)	Harris; Dominique Jones; Hood; Warmley; Timothy Thomas; Phillips; Theron Thomas	Harris; Jaydot; Precision Productions; Theron Thomas	2:55
6.	"2 in Luv"	Harris; Theron Thomas; Jhaye McKie; Phillips; Warmley; Hood; Adam Duggins; Rafe Van Hoy; Maurice Young	Theron Thomas; Jaydot; Precision Productions; Wilson	2:58
7.	"Winning" (featuring Big Freedia)	Warmley; Harris; Claudell Mosanto; Phillips; Theron Thomas; Hood	Harris; Precision Productions; Deli Banger; Theron Thomas	2:30
Total length:				21:23

=== Notes ===
- "2 in Luv" contains a sample from "I'm a Thug", as written by Maurice Young, Adam Duggins and Rafe Van Hoy, and as performed by Trick Daddy.

== Charts ==
Chart performance for CiCi
Chart (2023)	Peak position
UK Album Downloads (OCC)	42
US Top Current Album Sales (Billboard)	90

== Release history ==
Region	Date	Edition	Format	Label	Ref.
Various	August 18, 2023	Standard	Digital download; streaming	Beauty Marks	
