= Queen & Slim (soundtrack) =

Queen & Slim: The Soundtrack

Soundtrack album by Various artists
- Released: November 15, 2019
- Length: 69:26
- Label: Motown
- Producers: Ethiopia Habtemariam (exec.); Melina Matsoukas (exec.); Lena Waithe (exec.); "Wacko" Wade; Benny Cassette; Blaqnmild; Blood Orange; Choker; Edwin Birdsong; Hit-Boy; J. Pettiford; James Green; Lauryn Hill; LeKenn; Matt Otto; Maurice Green; Moses Sumney; PRGRSHN; Raphael Saadiq; Roy Ayers; Salih Williams; Syd; The-Dream; Tricky Stewart; William Allen

Singles from Queen & Slim: The Soundtrack
- 1. "Collide" Released: October 10, 2018; 2. "Ride or Die" Released: November 15, 2019; 3. "Guarding the Gates" Released: November 15, 2019

Professional ratings
Review scores
Source	Rating
HipHopDX	3.9/5
Pitchfork	6.5/10

Queen & Slim: The Soundtrack is the soundtrack to Melina Matsoukas' 2019 film Queen & Slim. It was released on November 15, 2019, through Motown Records.

== Track listing ==
=== Queen & Slim: The Soundtrack ===
No.	Title	Writer(s)	Producer(s)	Length
1.	"Ride or Die" (performed by Megan Thee Stallion and VickeeLo)	Megan Pete; Victoria Phillips; Adam Pigott	Blaqnmild	2:03
2.	"Soul Sista (Remix)" (performed by Bilal and Raphael Saadiq)	Bilal Oliver; James Mtume; Saadiq	Saadiq	5:40
3.	"Yo Love" (performed by Vince Staples, 6lack, and Mereba)	Staples; Ricardo Valentine; Marian Mereba; Jairus Mozee; LeKen Taylor	LeKenn	2:24
4.	"Collide" (performed by Tiana Major9 featuring EarthGang)	Akil King; Benedetto Rotondi; Josh Lopez; Kaveh Rastegar; Olu Fann; Sam Barsh; Sonyae Elise; Stacy Barthe	Benny Cassette; PRGRSHN^{[a]}	3:25
5.	"Getting Late" (performed by Syd)	Sydney Bennett	Syd	3:07
6.	"Still Tippin'" (performed by Mike Jones featuring Slim Thug and Paul Wall)	M. Jones; Paul Slayton; Salih Williams; Stayve Thomas	Williams	4:31
7.	"Queen & Slim" (performed by the Coast Contra and BJ the Chicago Kid)	Eric Jamal; Mario Lozano; Ras Austin; Taj Austin; Brian Sledge; J. Pettiford	Pettiford	4:14
8.	"Frame" (performed by Choker)	Christopher Lloyd	Choker	5:01
9.	"Catch the Sun" (performed by Lil Baby)	Dominique Jones; Chauncey Hollis	Hit-Boy	3:03
10.	"Searching" (performed by Roy Ayers)	Ayers	Ayers; Edwin Birdsong; William Allen; Maurice Green; James Green	4:08
11.	"Guarding the Gates" (performed by Ms. Lauryn Hill)	Hill	Hill	6:00
12.	"My Money, My Baby" (performed by Burna Boy)	Damini Ogulu; Rotondi	Benny Cassette	3:05
13.	"Cedes Benz" (performed by The-Dream)	Terius Nash; Christopher Stewart	The-Dream; Tricky Stewart	5:38
14.	"Standin' At Yo Door" (Live at DBA Music Club, New Orleans, LA / 2017) (performed by Little Freddie King)	Fread E. Martin	"Wacko" Wade	6:57
15.	"Runnin' Away" (performed by Blood Orange, Ian Isiah, and Jason Arce)	Derrick Stewart; Emandu Wilcox; Romye Robinson; Trevant Hardson; Luiz Bonfá; James Dewitt Yancey; Maria Chermont	Blood Orange	5:42
16.	"Doomed" (performed by Moses Sumney)	Sumney; Matt Otto	Sumney; Otto	4:28
Total length:				1:09:26

Notes

- ^{^[a]} signifies a vocal producer

=== Queen & Slim (Original Motion Picture Score) ===
No.	Title	Length
1.	"Kids"	1:01
2.	"Hair"	2:09
3.	"Slim Lets Go"	0:43
4.	"Opening"	2:07
5.	"This Is A Safe Place"	0:36
6.	"Bed"	0:45
7.	"A Couple Deer"	2:24
8.	"Slim’s Haircut"	0:35
9.	"What’s Next"	1:35
10.	"Love Theme (Dance)"	2:33
11.	"Slim’s Horse"	1:17
12.	"Slim Calls Home"	1:31
13.	"Uncle’s House"	1:41
14.	"Love Theme (Photograph)"	1:57
15.	"Get Upstairs"	1:33
16.	"The Sheriff"	0:44
17.	"Start The Car"	2:15
18.	"Sneak Out"	4:17
19.	"Arrival"	3:40
20.	"Kissed All Your Scars"	3:10
Total length:		36:30

== Accolades ==
Award	Date of ceremony	Category	Recipients	Result	Ref.
Hollywood Music in Media Awards	November 20, 2019	Best Music Supervision – Film	Kier Lehman	Nominated	
Hollywood Music in Media Awards	November 20, 2019	Best Soundtrack Album	Queen & Slim	Nominated	
Black Reel Awards	February 6, 2020	Outstanding Original Score	Devonté Hynes	Nominated	
Black Reel Awards	February 6, 2020	Outstanding Original Song	"Collide" by Tiana Major9 and EarthGang	Won	
Black Reel Awards	February 6, 2020	Outstanding Original Song	"Guarding the Gates" by Lauryn Hill	Nominated	
Guild of Music Supervisors Awards	February 6, 2020	Best Music Supervision for Films Budgeted Under $25 Million	Kier Lehman	Won	
NAACP Image Awards	February 22, 2020	Outstanding Soundtrack/Compilation	Queen & Slim	Nominated	

== Charts ==
Chart positions for Queen & Slim: The Soundtrack
Chart (2019)	Peak position
US Billboard 200	122
US Soundtrack Albums (Billboard)	9
US Top Rap Albums (Billboard)	16
US Top R&B Albums (Billboard)	16
