= Choker (musician) =

American singer-songwriter and record producer

- Born: Christopher Lloyd; December 16, 1995 (age 30); Detroit, Michigan, United States
- Genres: R&B; hip hop; soul; psychedelic rock
- Occupations: Singer-songwriter; rapper; record producer
- Label: Jet Fuzz

Christopher Lloyd, known professionally as Choker, is an American singer-songwriter, rapper and record producer. Known for his eclecticism, his coded lyricism and his falsetto laced vocals. Choker has gained acclaim for blending genres and subgenres of R&B, rap, soul and psychedelic rock.

== Early life ==
Lloyd was born on the 16th of December 1995 and raised in Detroit, Michigan. His parents immigrated from Rae Town, Jamaica. He has described his adolescence as "quite isolated". At a young age he became interested in filmmaking, script writing, and poetry. He began learning music production at age 18 through tutorials on YouTube, and began singing the following year.

== Career ==
Lloyd released his first mixtape, Die Slow, in 2015. In 2017, he released his debut album, Peak, a self-produced 10-track album. The following year, he released a 14-track album Honeybloom which contained elements of R&B, acoustic folk, and cloud rap. In 2019, he released 3 extended plays: "Mono No Moto", "Dog Candy", and "Forever & A Few" under his "Filling Space" series. He featured on Queen & Slim: The Soundtrack, released in November 2019, with the song "Frame". He released the album Heaven Ain't Sold on February 20, 2026, following after a 7 year hiatus.

== Artistry ==
His music has been described as containing elements of R&B, rap, soul, acoustic folk, cloud rap, and psychedelic rock. He has listed J Dilla, Brian Eno, Susumu Yokota, Aphex Twin, Elzhi, and Danny Brown as influences on his music. He has stated that his stage name "stems from the energy and mystique surrounding old metal acts."

== Personal life ==
As of February 2026, Lloyd lives in Los Angeles, California.

== Discography ==
=== Studio albums ===
Title	Details
Peak	Released: May 6, 2017; Label: Self-released; Formats: Digital download, streaming, vinyl
Honeybloom	Released: August 3, 2018; Label: Jet Fuzz; Formats: Digital download, streaming, CD, vinyl
Heaven Ain't Sold	Released: February 20, 2026; Label: Jet Fuzz; Formats: Digital download, streaming, CD, cassette, vinyl

=== Extended plays ===
Title	Details
Mono No Moto	Released: January 25, 2019; Label: Jet Fuzz; Formats: Digital download, streaming
Dog Candy	Released: February 1, 2019; Label: Jet Fuzz; Formats: Digital download, streaming
Forever & A Few	Released: February 8, 2019; Label: Jet Fuzz; Formats: Digital download, streaming
