= Dose (song) =

Single by Ciara

from the album Beauty Marks
- Released: September 14, 2018
- Studio: Beauty Marks Studios
- Genre: Dance-pop; R&B
- Length: 3:42
- Label: Beauty Marks
- Songwriters: Rodney Jerkins; Ciara Harris; Carmen Reece
- Producer: Rodney Jerkins

Ciara singles chronology
"Freak Me" (2018)	"Dose" (2018)	"Greatest Love" (2019)

Music video
- "Dose" on YouTube

"Dose" is a song recorded by American singer Ciara released on September 14, 2018. The song was composed by Rodney Jerkins, Ciara, Carmen Reece and Sam Fischer.

== Background and composition ==
"Dose" was written by Ciara, Rodney Jerkins, Carmen Reece and Sam Fischer, and produced by Rodney Jerkins.

The song is a bass-heavy, drumline beat track played by a marching band. It contains lyrics of strength and female empowerment.

== Live performances ==
She has performed the song at the 2018 American Music Awards as a medley with "Level Up". The song was also performed on Bruno Mars' 24K Magic World Tour, where Ciara served as an opening act.

== Music video ==
The music video for "Dose" was released on October 25, 2018, Ciara's 33rd birthday. It was directed by Ciara, Jamaica Craft and Diane Martel, who all also choreographed the video.

The video gives a tribute to Atlanta, Georgia, which is the singer's hometown. The video features known faces including the mayor of Atlanta, Keisha Lance Bottoms, and also hip hop dancer Jaylah Johnson.

== Charts ==
Chart (2018)	Peak position
US R&B Digital Song Sales (Billboard)	7
