= Super Girl Groups, Henny =

Episode of RuPaul's Drag Race All Stars

- RuPaul's Drag Race All Stars episode
- Episode no.: Season 4 Episode 2
- Presented by: RuPaul
- Original air date: December 21, 2018

Guest appearances
- Ciara (guest judge); Kacey Musgraves (guest judge); Leland; Stacy Layne Matthews

Episode chronology
← Previous "All Star Super Queen Variety Show"	Next → "Snatch Game of Love"

"Super Girl Groups, Henny" is the second episode of the fourth season of the American television series RuPaul's Drag Race All Stars. It originally aired on December 21, 2018. The episode's main challenge tasks the contestants with performing in two competing girl groups, both featuring former competitor Stacy Layne Matthews. Ciara and Kacey Musgraves are guest judges. American singer and songwriter Leland also makes a guest appearance to assist. Farrah Moan is eliminated from the competition by Valentina, who places in the top and wins a lip-sync contest against Monét X Change to "Into You" (2016) by Ariana Grande.

== Episode ==
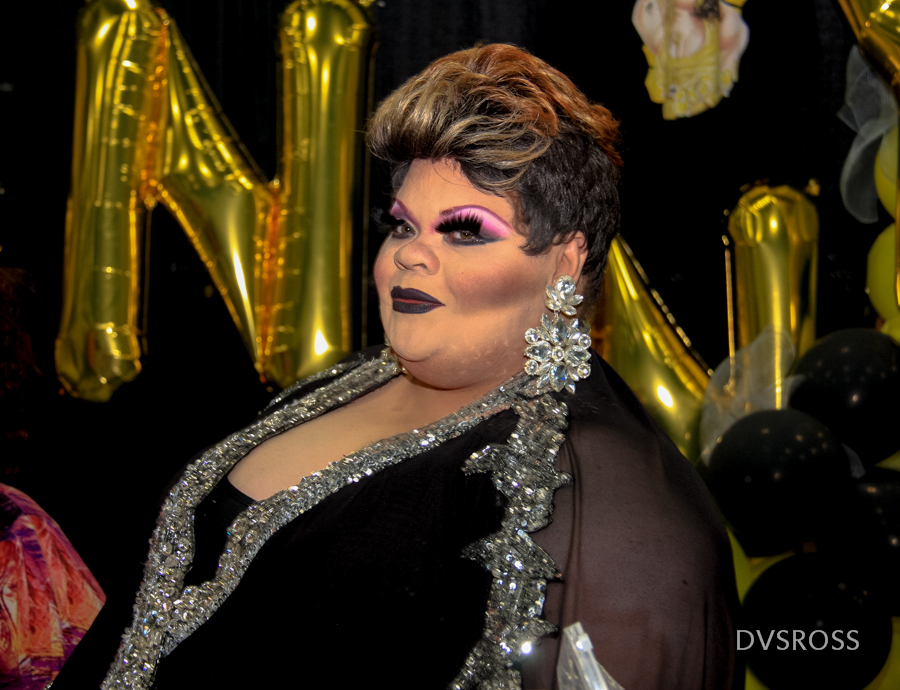
Former contestant Stacy Layne Matthews (pictured in 2018) makes a guest appearance for the main challenge.

The contestants return to the workroom after Jasmine Masters was eliminated by Trinity the Tuck on the previous episode. Monique Heart reveals that she would have eliminated Jasmine Masters from the competition, had she won the lip-sync contest. On a new day, RuPaul greets the group and reveals the main challenge, which tasks the contestants with writing, recording, and performing to original verses in competing girl groups. Leland and Freddy Scott will assist with the recording process. As the winners of the last main challenge, Monique Heart and Trinity the Tuck are designated captains and select their team members. Gia Gunn, Latrice Royale, Manila Luzon, Trinity the Tuck, and Valentina are on Team Don't Funk It Up. Farrah Moan, Monét X Change, Monique Heart, and Naomi Smalls are on Team Errybody Say Love. Before leaving, RuPaul reveals that both teams will be working with former contestant Stacy Layne Matthews, who enters the workroom. The contestants are tasked with highlighting her talents.

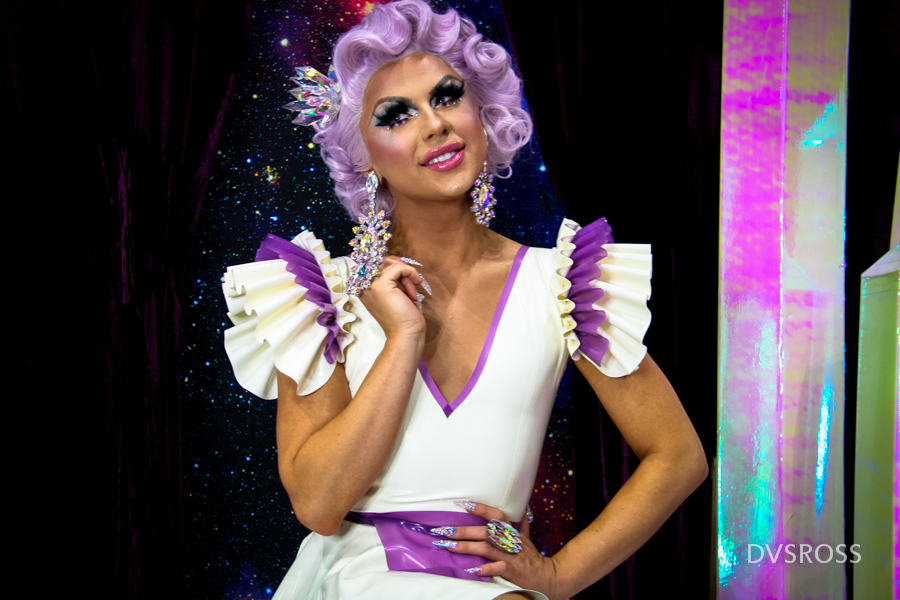
Farrah Moan (pictured in 2018) is eliminated from the competition.

The contestants separate into teams and start to develop their concepts. Gia Gunn shares with the teammates that she and Farrah Moan had a falling out. The two groups then record vocals with Leland and Scott, based on tracks vocals by Lizzo. The contestants then rehearse choreography with Stacy Layne Matthews on the main stage. On elimination day, the contestants make final preparations for the performances and fashion show. Farrah Moan and Gia Gunn get into an argument. On the main stage, RuPaul welcomes fellow judges Michelle Visage and Ross Mathews, as well as guest judges Ciara and Kacey Musgraves. RuPaul shares the assignment of the main challenge, then the performances commence. RuPaul shares the runway category ("Eleguence After Dark"), then the fashion show commences.

After the contestants present their looks, the judges deliver their critiques and share the results with the group. Monét X Change and Valentina place in the top two. Farrah Moan and Monique Heart place in the bottom two. The contestants deliberate in the workroom, then Monét X Change and Valentina face off in a lip-sync contest to "Into You" (2016) by Ariana Grande. Valentina wins the lip-sync and decides to eliminate Farrah Moan from the competition. Farrah Moan returns to the workroom and uses lipstick to write a message on the mirror for the remaining contestants.

== Production and broadcast ==
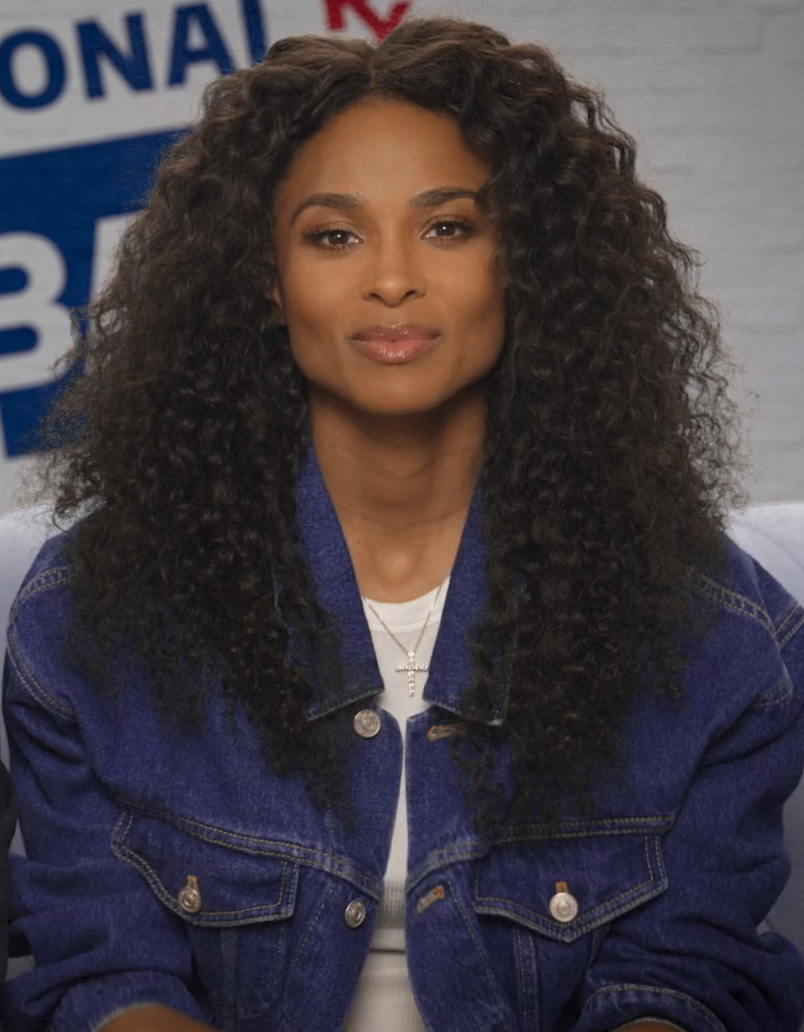
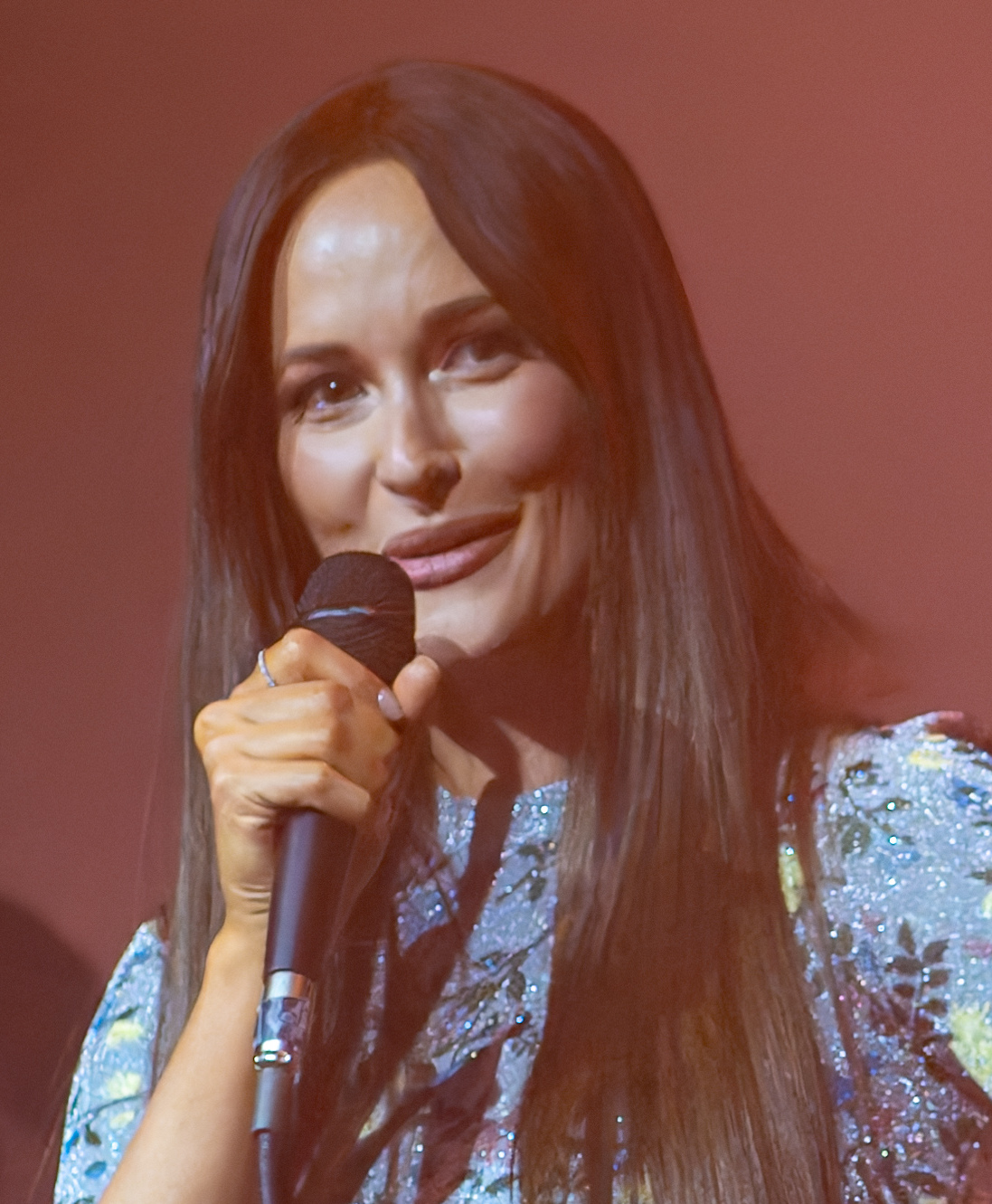
Ciara (top, pictured in 2019) and Kacey Musgraves (bottom) are guest judges.

The episode originally aired on December 21, 2018.

Stacy Layne Matthews's catchphrase "henny" appears in the episode's title.

=== Fashion ===
For the main stage, RuPaul wears a blue-and-gold dress and a blonde wig. For Team Don't Funk It Up's performance, Gia Gunn has a colorful outfit with a removable tutu. Latrice Royale wears a white outfit and a pink wig. Manila Luzon has a bodysuit and a wig that is both blonde and dark. Trinity the Tuck has a silver bodysuit with tall matching boots and a large wig. Valentina has a red outfit, large hoop earrings, and a dark wig. For Team Errybody Say Love's performance, Naomi Smalls wears a glittery outfit and a blonde blonde wig. Monique Heart has black pants, a red jacket, a collar, and a dark wig. Farrah Moan has a pink-and-tan bodysuit and a blonde wig with pink highlights. Monét X Change wears a purple-and-white bodysuit, red high-heeled shoes, sunglasses, and a brown wig. For both performances, Stacy Layne Matthews has black pants, a gold shirt, and a short brown wig.

For the fashion show, Gia Gunn wears a pink-and-silver dress and a large dark wig. Latrice Royale has a black outfit with matching earrings and a dark wig. Manila Luzon wears a silver outfit with toule and a blonde wig. Trinity the Tuck has a red dress with matching high-heels and a red wig. Valentina wears a long dress with a hydrangea pattern, a brown wig, and a floral headpiece. Naomi Smalls has a silver outfit and a dark wig with a fascinator. Monique Heart wears a purple dress, part of which is removed, as well as a long blonde wig. Farrah Moan has a long silver dress, a white boa with ostrich feathers, and a pink wig. Monét X Change wears a red outfit with matching gloves, silver jewelry, and a dark wig.

For the lip-sync contest, Monét X Change wears a long green dress, matching high-heels, and a blonde wig. She removes part of her dress during the performance. Valentina has a short with crystals and sequins, hoop earrings, and a long brown wig.

== Reception ==
Kate Kulzick of The A.V. Club gave the episode a rating of 'B+'. Writing for Vulture, Matt Rogers rated the episode four out of five stars. LA Weekly's Michael Cooper said Valentina's win was "perhaps [her] most shining moment so far". Kevin O'Keeffe of Xtra Magazine said Valentina's performance during "Into You" was "good". Sam Brooks ranked the performance number 31 in The Spinoff's 2019 "definitive ranking" of 162 Drag Race lip-syncs to date. Stephen Daw ranked the "Into You" contest third in Billboard's 2021 overview of lip-syncs to songs by Grande.

== See also ==
- Ciara videography
- Girl groups in the Drag Race franchise
