= How We Roll (Ciara and Chris Brown song) =

Single by Ciara and Chris Brown

from the EP CiCi
- Released: August 4, 2023
- Genre: R&B
- Length: 3:19
- Label: Beauty Marks
- Songwriters: Ciara Harris; Chalra Warmley; Chris Brown; Christopher John Taylor; Claudell Monsanto; Kasey Michael Phillips; Tatenda Terence Kamera; William Hood
- Producers: Ciara; Precision Productions; Deli Banger; Mr Kamera; Theron Thomas

Ciara singles chronology
"Get Loose" (2023)	"How We Roll" (2023)	"Forever" (2023)

Chris Brown singles chronology
"Summer Too Hot" (2023)	"How We Roll" (2023)	"IDGAF" (2023)

Music video
- "How We Roll" on YouTube

"How We Roll" is an R&B duet by American singers Ciara and Chris Brown. It was released on August 4, 2023, through Beauty Marks, and is the lead single from Ciara's EP CiCi. A remix featuring Lil Wayne was released November 3, 2023.

== Background and release ==
Ciara released the singles "Jump", "Better Thangs" featuring Summer Walker, and "Da Girls", which were all expected to be singles from her then-untitled eighth studio album. On August 2, 2023, Ciara announced the single "How We Roll", in collaboration with Chris Brown. "How We Roll" marks the second collaboration for the two artists after their first collaboration on Ciara's album, Fantasy Ride (2009) on the track, "Turntables". Prior to "Turntables", the two performed a dance sequence at the BET Awards in 2008 during Brown's performance of "Take You Down".

In 2022, it was suggested that Ciara was slated to join Brown on stage for a Michael Jackson tribute at the American Music Awards that was unexplainably canceled by the show organizers. Afterwards, Ciara posted a dance rehearsal video of her and Brown to her Instagram.

On August 4, 2023, Ciara released the song, and announced her EP, CiCi. The official remix of "How We Roll", featuring Lil Wayne, was released on November 3, 2023.

== Chart performance ==
"How We Roll" debuted at 18 on the US Bubbling Under Hot 100 Singles chart on November 18, 2023 and peaked at 5 on January 13, 2024, spending 8 weeks on the chart. It reached 9 on the US R&B/Hip-Hop Airplay chart, becoming Ciara's fifteenth top ten hit and biggest hit on the chart since "I Bet" reached 8 in May 2015; it also reached 9 on the US Rhythmic Songs chart, becoming her tenth top ten hit and first since "Like a Boy" in May 2007.

== Music video ==
The official music video was directed by Christian Breslauer, and visual effects were created by The Kroot. and released on August 4, 2023. It features Ciara and Chris Brown performing the song on moving trucks. Marc Griffin, reviewing for Vibe, praised the video, stating it was "laidback" and "groovy", whilst noting the artists' obvious dance influences from Michael and Janet Jackson.

== Accolades ==
The music video received a nomination for Best Dance Performance at the 2023 Soul Train Music Awards. The song helped songwriter Theron Thomas win Songwriter of the Year, Non-Classical at the 66th Annual Grammy Awards. At the 55th NAACP Image Awards, "How We Roll" won the award for Outstanding Duo, Group or Collaboration (Traditional) and the video was nominated for Outstanding Music Video/Visual Album in 2024.

== Track listings ==
Single

1. "How We Roll" – 3:19
2. "How We Roll" (clean version) – 3:19
3. "How We Roll" (instrumental) – 3:19

Versions extended play

1. "How We Roll" – 3:19
2. "How We Roll" (sped up) – 2:47
3. "How We Roll" (slowed) – 3:43
4. "How We Roll" (instrumental) – 3:19

Remix single

1. "How We Roll" (remix with Lil Wayne) – 3:41

Major League Djz Remix

1. "How We Roll" (Major League Djz & Yumbs Remix) – 3:41

== Charts ==
=== Weekly charts ===
Chart performance for "How We Roll"
Chart (2023–2024)	Peak position
New Zealand Hot Singles (RMNZ)	2
South Africa (Billboard)	22
UK Singles Downloads (Official Charts)	21
US Bubbling Under Hot 100 (Billboard)	5
US Digital Song Sales (Billboard)	24
US Radio Songs (Billboard)	39
US Hot R&B/Hip-Hop Songs (Billboard)	34
US R&B/Hip-Hop Airplay (Billboard)	9
US Rhythmic Airplay (Billboard)	9

Chart performance for "How We Roll" (remix)
Chart (2023)	Peak position
New Zealand Hot Singles (RMNZ)	17

=== Year-end charts ===
2024 year-end chart performance for "How We Roll"
Chart (2024)	Position
US R&B/Hip-Hop Airplay (Billboard)	34

== Certifications ==
Certifications from "How We Roll"
Region	Certification	Certified units/sales
New Zealand (RMNZ)	Gold	15,000^{‡}
United States (RIAA)	Gold	500,000^{‡}
^{‡} Sales+streaming figures based on certification alone.

== Release history ==
Release dates and formats for "How We Roll"
Region	Date	Version	Format(s)	Label(s)	Ref.
Various	August 4, 2023	Original	Digital download; streaming	Beauty Marks Entertainment	
Various	September 22, 2023	Versions	Digital download; streaming	Beauty Marks Entertainment	
Various	November 3, 2023	Lil Wayne Remix	Digital download; streaming	Beauty Marks Entertainment	
Various	December 15, 2023	Major League Djz & Yumbs Remix	Digital download; streaming	Beauty Marks Entertainment	
