= Coast Contra =

American hip hop group

- Origin: Los Angeles, California; Philadelphia, Pennsylvania
- Genres: Hip hop; underground hip hop; alternative hip hop; golden age hip hop; conscious hip hop; hardcore hip hop; West Coast hip hop; East Coast hip hop; jazz rap; boom bap; spoken word
- Years active: 2015–present
- Members: Mario Lozano Mosquera; Eric Jamal Morrison; Taj Austin; Ras Austin
- Website: https://coastcontra.com/

Coast Contra is an American hip hop group formed in 2015 by Mario Lozano Mosquera, Eric Jamal Morrison, and twin brothers Taj Austin and Ras Austin (twin sons of R&B singer Teedra Moses and West Coast rapper Ras Kass). They are known for their choreography and classic hip-hop sound.

Their first single, "Queen & Slim" featuring BJ the Chicago Kid was the featured title track from the 2019 film Queen & Slim. In 2022, they had a television debut on The Tonight Show Starring Jimmy Fallon and were featured on the song "Destruction" in the album moMINTs by rapper Tobe Nwigwe.

Coast Contra built up a following in 2022 with multiple freestyle videos which are featured on their YouTube channel, with their single "Never Freestyle" gaining the most attention. They released their debut studio album in 2022 titled Apt. 505.

They were featured on Ciara's 2022 single "Jump".

In 2025, off of their EP named The Fifth, they gained attention from the track, "Don’t Worry."

== Discography ==
=== Albums ===
- Apt. 505 (2022)
- The Old Way Mixtape (2023)
- In Case You Forgot - EP (2025)
- The Fifth - EP (2025)

=== Singles ===
- "Queen & Slim" (featuring BJ the Chicago Kid) (2019)
- "My Lady" (2021)
- "AF1" (2021)
- "Pimpin' Benjamin" (2021)
- "Intentional" (2021)
- "Explicit" (2022)
- "Legacy" (2022)
- "Never Freestyle" (2022)

== Awards and nominations ==
=== Berlin Music Video Awards ===
The Berlin Music Video Awards is an international festival that promotes the art of music videos.

| Year | Nominated work | Award | Result | Ref. |
|---|---|---|---|---|
| 2025 | "DON'T WORRY" | Best Cinematography | Won | |
