= Greatest Love (Ciara song) =

Single by Ciara

from the album Beauty Marks
- Released: February 12, 2019
- Studio: Beauty Marks Studios
- Genre: R&B
- Length: 3:43
- Label: Beauty Marks
- Songwriters: Ciara; Jasper Cameron; Rod Cameron; Theron Thomas
- Producers: Jasper Cameron; Rod Cameron

Ciara singles chronology
"Dose" (2018)	"Greatest Love" (2019)	"Thinkin Bout You" (2019)

Music video
- "Greatest Love" on YouTube

"Greatest Love" is a song by American singer-songwriter Ciara released on February 12, 2019, by Beauty Marks Entertainment.

The track was written and produced by regular collaborators, Theron Thomas, who previously worked on Ciara and Jackie, and Jasper Cameron, who has been working with Ciara since her debut album Goodies (2004).

== Composition ==
The song lasts for 3 minutes and 43 seconds and has a slower tempo compared to previously released singles "Level Up", "Freak Me" and "Dose". It has been described as having a grinding R&B groove punctuated by heavy bass and layered with waves of airy synths.

== Music video ==
The music video was released the same day as the song.

== Track listing ==
- Digital download
1. "Greatest Love" – 3:43

== Charts ==
Chart (2019)	Peak position
US R&B Digital Song Sales (Billboard)	21
