= Thinkin Bout You (Ciara song) =

Single by Ciara

from the album Beauty Marks
- Released: March 29, 2019
- Studio: Beauty Marks Studios; Space Primates Palace
- Genre: Pop; disco
- Length: 3:48
- Label: Beauty Marks
- Songwriters: Ciara Wilson; Ester Dean; Marc Sibley; Nathan Cunningham
- Producer: Space Primates

Ciara singles chronology
"Greatest Love" (2019)	"Thinkin Bout You" (2019)	"Nails, Hair, Hips, Heels (Remix)" (2019)

Music video
- "Thinkin Bout You" on YouTube

"Thinkin Bout You" is a song by American singer-songwriter Ciara, from her seventh studio album Beauty Marks (2019). The song was released on March 29, 2019, as the fifth single from the album. It was distributed to digital download and streaming formats by Beauty Marks Entertainment, Ciara's own record label. The song was written by Ciara, Ester Dean, Marc Sibley, Nathan Cunningham, and produced by Space Primates. The music video for the track was released alongside the single, and was directed by American director Hannah Lux Davis. She worked alongside British stylist Phoebe Lettice Thompson for the visual and it features Ciara dancing around a hotel suite as she gets ready for a date. To promote its release, Ciara has performed the song live at the 2019 Billboard Music Awards.

"Thinkin Bout You" has received positive reviews from music critics. The song's upbeat rhythm has been favoured and branded pop, disco and a homage to 1980's popular music. The single has so far achieved modest success on the US R&B Digital Songs Billboard chart, peaking at number three.

== Background ==
Ciara announced the single on March 28, 2019 via her Twitter account. The song was released the following day on March 29 and it serves as the fifth single from her seventh studio album "Beauty Marks". Ciara started her own record label in 2017 and "Beauty Marks" is named after her label and the first album to have been released on it. "Thinkin Bout You" was distributed to digital download and streaming formats via the label.

The song was written by Ciara, Ester Dean, Marc Sibley and Nathan Cunningham. It was produced by Space Primates.

Ciara told Ericka Franklin from The Hollywood Reporter that the song is "retro with a modern twist" and "has a bit of a disco vibe to it." She told Liz Calvario‍ from Entertainment Tonight that "Thinkin Bout You" is about the "special feeling" you have in the early stages of a relationship.

== Music video ==
The music video for the track was teased via the singer's Instagram account on March 29, 2019. It was released alongside the single the following day. It was directed by the American director Hannah Lux Davis. The video features Ciara singing and dancing around a luxury hotel suite as she gets ready for a date. As the video progresses, she is seen taking a bath, dancing on the bed while getting ready and changing into multiple outfits as she dances around the hotel suite. At the end of the video, she decides on a final outfit just as her date arrives at the door. Ciara worked with the British stylist Phoebe Lettice Thompson for the video. She did not have many different styles in the video because the narrative of the video is simply getting ready for a date. Ciara added that she was "very comfortable dancing around in my room and letting go and getting lost in my thoughts."

Glenn Rowley from Billboard called the video a "bubbly clip" which opens like a scene out of the movie Pretty Woman.

== Live performances ==
Ciara performed the song live for the first time at the April 2019 New Orleans Jazz & Heritage Festival. Ciara's first live televised performance was at the 2019 Billboard Music Awards on May 1, 2019. To promote the set Ciara partnered with music identification application Shazam. Viewers who used the application to identify her performance could access exclusive backstage rehearsal footage. The performance was compared to the works of Janet Jackson. On May 15, 2019 Ciara sang the track live on Sirius XM. On May 17, Ciara performed the song on the outdoor stage on Jimmy Kimmel Live!. She wore a red jumpsuit as part of a choreographed set and she was accompanied by the dance group The Lab.

== Critical reception ==
Emily Zemler from Rolling Stone branded it a "buoyant pop song" accompanied by a "hooky chorus and disco-tinged dance floor beat." Zemler interpreted the song as Ciara "reflecting on a missed love connection." Jessica Bennett (Ebony) labelled it a "feel-good single". Billboard's Rowley said that "Thinkin Bout You" has a "effervescent" first verse and a "fizzy chorus". Fellow Billboard journalist Carl Lamarre called it an "uptempo bop". In a review posted by GQ the song is described as "a really good pop track is this intangible quality that make you feel sexy and great." It also stated that "it's upbeat in a way that feels genuine" and "it's one part sentimental, and one part feeling herself." The use of pop guitars and synths were compared to those featured on a typical Carly Rae Jepsen song. Chris DeVille writing for Stereogum said that the track is a "peppy Prince-inspired pop song" that sounds similar to Janelle Monáe's song "Make Me Feel" crossed with Justin Timberlake's "Can't Stop The Feeling".

Mike Wass from Idolator said that the song rivalled her previous singles "Level Up" and "Greatest Love" as the best release from "Beauty Marks". He concluded that the song is "a sugary sweet delight that promises great things for the album." Glennisha Morgan from Kiss 95.1 said "the uptempo pop track has a bit of an '80s feel to it." A writer for Mix 93.3 called it a "love song" with a "upbeat but laid back feel." Fox Life's Elena Arrisico said that the "fresh" song has an eighties sound that could make it a commercial success during summer months. Quinn Keaney from PopSugar said that the very danceable record is the kind "you sing embarrassingly loud in the shower." Hugo Gloss said that "Thinkin Bout You" described Ciara's delivery as "soft vocals" to a "dance beat".

== Charts ==
Chart (2019)	Peak position
France Downloads (SNEP)	193
US R&B/Hip-Hop Digital Songs (Billboard)	20
