= The ATL Project =

Studio album by ATL
- Released: May 4, 2004
- Genre: R&B
- Length: 41:02
- Label: Sony Music Entertainment
- Producer: The Partners and David McPherson (executive); Johnta Austin (co-executive); Jazze Pha, R. Kelly, Mario Winans

The ATL Project is the debut and only studio album by ATL released on May 4, 2004.

This album marks the first appearance of then-unknown American singer Ciara. This album and the two songs she's featured on "It's Us" and "I Wish" were released on May 4, 2004. Whereas Ciara's first single "Goodies" didn't release until the next month on June 8, 2004.

== Track listing ==
No.	Title	Producer(s)	Length
1.	"Intro"	Flash Technology	2:50
2.	"Calling All Girls" (featuring R. Kelly)	R. Kelly	4:32
3.	"Make It Up With Love"	Jazze Pha	3:49
4.	"Let Me"	Mishke	4:29
5.	"It's Us" (featuring Ciara)	Bryan-Michael Cox	3:54
6.	"Shawty" (featuring Cassidy)	Mario Winans	3:58
7.	"Holla At Ya Boy"	Jazze Pha	4:13
8.	"You Are"	Teddy Bishop	3:55
9.	"I Wish" (featuring Ciara)	Jazze Pha	4:40
10.	"No More"	Teddy Bishop	4:42

- NB: The last song, "No More" contains a sample of Aaliyah's posthumously released song "Come Over".

=== Other recorded songs ===
- "I Know."
- "Dangerous (For the Record)"
- "One"
- "Too Perfect for Me"
