= Ecstasy (Ciara song) =

Single by Ciara

from the album CiCi
- Released: April 4, 2025
- Genre: R&B
- Length: 3:59
- Label: Beauty Marks
- Songwriter(s): Ciara; Courtlin Jabrae; Theron Thomas
- Producer(s): Leather Jackett; Tommy (TBHITS) Brown

Ciara singles chronology
"Wassup" (2024)	"Ecstasy" (2025)	"This Right Here" (2025)

"Ecstasy" is a song by American singer Ciara, which was released as a single on April 4, 2025. It is the lead single from Ciara's eighth studio album, CiCi. A remix with Normani and Teyana Taylor was released on June 6, 2025. "Ecstasy" became Ciara's seventh top ten hit on the US Hot R&B Songs chart.

== Music video ==
An official music video was released on April 4, 2025; it was directed by Diane Martel who previously shot the videos for Ciara's singles "Promise" (2006) and "Ride" (2010). It was showcased on the billboards of Times Square in New York City. It was the final video Martel directed before her death in September 2025.

== Reception ==
Emily Zemler, reviewing for Rolling Stone, called the single "empowering". Buddy Iahn, for The Music Universe praised the single, calling it "a classic R&B sultry song", adding that it "empower[ed] individuals to embrace authentic love and revel in the intoxicating freedom of owning their identity". Essence added "Ecstasy" to their "Best New Music This Week" list, with reviewer Okla Jones stating the song was a "dazzling return" for Ciara, adding the song was "a sultry groove that proves [Ciara's] still queen of the dance floor".

== Remix ==
A new version of the song which features Normani on the second verse and Teyana Taylor in the middle, was released on June 6, 2025. The remix was described as "slick" by Rollingstone.

== Charts ==
Chart performance for "Ecstasy"
Chart (2025)	Peak position
US Hot R&B Songs (Billboard)	10
US R&B/Hip-Hop Airplay (Billboard)	39
US R&B/Hip-Hop Digital Songs (Billboard)	11
