= ATL (group) =

R&B/hip hop group from Atlanta

- Origin: Atlanta, Georgia, United States
- Genres: R&B, hip hop
- Years active: 2001–2005
- Labels: Sony Music Entertainment
- Past members: Trè'Kas "Trè" Simms; Marvin "Will" Williams, Jr. Lawrence "L-Rock" Gibbs IV; Cory "Danger" Griffin
- Website: www.atlmusic.com

ATL was an R&B group from Atlanta, Georgia. The Vocalists were Trè'Kas "Tré" Simms, Marvin "Will" Williams, Lawrence "L-Rock" Gibbs and Rapper Cory "Danger" Griffin. They had enlisted R. Kelly to produce their debut album The ATL Project, released in July 2004. Two singles were released from the album: "Calling All Girls" (#12 UK Singles Chart, May 2004), and "Make It Up With Love" (#21 UK, August 2004).

== Biography ==
Simms, Williams, Gibbs, and Griffin came together after being chosen though an Atlanta-area talent search where previous R&B groups (112, Jagged Edge) had crossed over into hip-hop, by either featuring a guest rapper, or appearing on someone else's album. ATL was a self-contained R&B/hip-hop/fusion band. The quartet enlisted R. Kelly to produce their debut single, "Calling All Girls", which was released in 2003.

Several of ATL's songs started leaking onto the internet in 2006 whether they are from an upcoming album or previously recorded for "The ATL Project" is unknown. Their songs include "All Grown Men", "Throwback", "In The Club Tonight" featuring Jagged Edge, "Do It" featuring UK MC Doctor, "Foolin' Around", "L.O.V.E.", "Riding Dirty" and "What I'm Looking For". However, the songs were very outdated, as they were actually three years old at the time, even though they were then-recently released. ATL has indeed disbanded, but the members are working on individual projects, according to Gibbs. It was announced in 2013 that ATL would be making a comeback for one night only in the summer. It is yet to be determined when the date will be for this reunion.

== Discography ==
=== Albums ===
- 2004: The ATL Project (#76 UK)

=== Singles ===
Year	Song	Peak chart positions			Album
Year	Song	US	US R&B	UK	Album
2003	"Calling All Girls"	—	48	12	The ATL Project
2004	"Make It Up With Love"	—	51	21	The ATL Project
