= Jump (Ciara song) =

Single by Ciara featuring Coast Contra
- Released: July 8, 2022
- Genre: Dance
- Length: 3:26
- Label: Beauty Marks; Uptown; Republic
- Composers: Sam Sumser; Sean Small
- Lyricists: Ciara; Theron Thomas
- Producers: Ciara; Sumser; Small; Thomas

Ciara singles chronology
"Rooted" (2020)	"Jump" (2022)	"Better Thangs" (2022)

Coast Contra singles chronology
"Never Freestyle" (2022)	"Jump" (2022)

Music video
- "Jump" on YouTube

"Jump" is a song by American singer Ciara, featuring American hip hop group Coast Contra. It was released on July 8, 2022, through Ciara's own label Beauty Marks Entertainment, in partnership with Uptown and Republic Records. It was intended as the lead single from Ciara's eighth studio album CiCi, but was not included on the final tracklist.

"Jump", a mid-tempo dance song, was praised by critics for its anthemic qualities. The release was followed by an accompanying music video the same day, which received praise for its 14 outfits and looks and high octane dancing which paid tribute to previous Ciara music videos, as well as earning comparisons to Ciara's inspiration, Janet Jackson.

== Background and release ==
In an interview with Rated R&B in May 2022, Ciara confirmed that her eighth album was complete and its first music video has been filmed. Around the same time, Ciara announced a new record which would see her record label Beauty Marks Entertainment partner with Uptown Records and Republic Records to release her eight studio album, at the time of announcement the album title and release date had not been unveiled. Speaking of the deal to work with Uptown and Republic, Ciara said:

"[Republic co-president] Wendy [Goldstein] and I have been in discussion to work together for some time and the enthusiasm that her and the entire team have expressed over this new project marks an exciting new chapter in my career. I am grateful to be able to continue my mission of making the world dance with a team I admire, who are at the forefront of empowering artists."

— interview with Billboard in June 2022.

Chris Malone Méndez from Forbes commented on Ciara's time in the music industry saying that during the 2000s, "Ciara's music was inescapable, reverberating from club walls and car speakers everywhere". Méndez also noted however that in the 2010s, although still popular, Ciara's "personal circumstances" were more public than her music. Following Beauty Marks, Ciara had also launched a clothing label, LITA by Ciara, as well as writing a children's novel Why Not You? with husband Russell Wilson. "Jump" is Ciara's first single in two years, following 2020 single "Rooted". Prior to this, Ciara released another standalone single "Melanin" featuring Lupita Nyong'o, La La Anthony and City Girls, as well as promoting her then-latest album Beauty Marks (2019). Describing the song, Ciara said "I'm back on my mission to make the world dance", while also confirming that it would be the first single from her then-upcoming eight album. "Jump" features upcoming American hip hop group Coast Contra and was released on July 8, 2022. The music video was released at 12pm EST.

== Music and lyrics ==
"Jump" is a mid-tempo dance song, described by Stereogum's Rachel Brodsky as bass-heavy, stating that it "sounds ready-made for sports arenas". Ciara wrote the lyrics alongside Theron Thomas from songwriter-artist duo Rock City, while Sam Sumser and Sean Smill composed the music. All four musicians are credited with producing the song. Rachel Blum, DJ Riggins, Jaycen Joshua, Jacob Richards and Mike Seaberg were all involved in mixing the track, while Joshua and Andrew "Andy" Park engineered the song. Thomas previously collaborated with Ciara on her single 2018 single "Level Up", which was also the first single from her previous album Beauty Marks (2019).

Lyrics include the lines "I know what you want from me / If you wanna have fun with me / Wanna be on the winning team." During promotion for the song, Ciara said "Jump" was a celebratory anthem, reflecting on her journey since her previous album Beauty Marks (2019), "it celebrates the beautiful shades of culture that comprise the inner and outer beauty of everyone. Embracing the unique nature of our skin tones threads together the tapestry of humankind." Describing the song, Ciara said "I feel like some of my best music is what I call stadium music ... It's also what I call 'Ghetto-Pop,' Its songs that can play in the hood and beyond, and that's always been important to me since day one."

== Critical reception ==
Writing for The Denver Post, Tiney Ricciardi called "Jump" a "booty bouncing blowout with enough jiggle and shake to carry you through to football season". Writing for Rap-Up, Devin said "Jump" was a "TikTok-ready anthem that will have you dancing all summer long." Parlemag noted that even based on social media teasers, fans called the song a bop. Meredith B. Kile from ET agreed, saying that "Jump" was a "club-ready" anthem. "Jump" was picked for inclusion on BrooklynVegan's "our favorite songs of the week playlist".

== Promotion ==
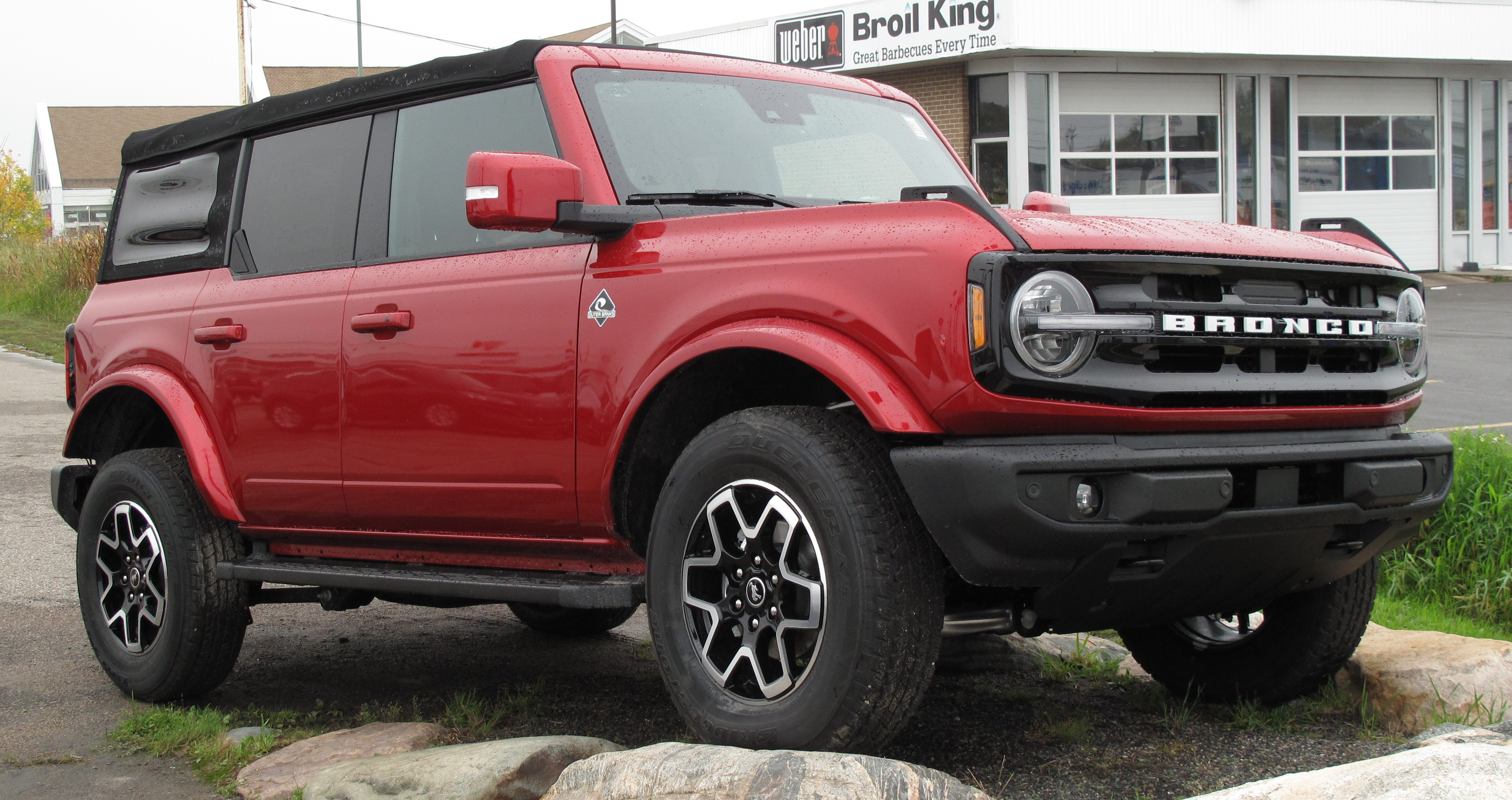
The use of the Ford Bronco in teasers was linked to husband Russell Wilson's move to the Denver Broncos.

Ciara began promoting the song with short clips via Twitter in June 2022. One such clip featured the singer twerking atop a Ford Bronco. The inclusion of a Bronco was a significant bit of cross-promotion, given that her husband, quarterback Russell Wilson, had recently moved to the Denver Broncos. The video itself garnered attention from fans for gas station where it was filmed, due to the inclusion of high gas prices. Alongside the song's release, Ciara released a media statement and made appearances on Good Morning America to promote the release. The wide-ranging interview discussed the song's meaning as well as her journey to becoming an independent artist.

A social media post on Instagram about the song said, "I wanna see you… Jump into the new YOU. Jump into LOVE (Loving on you:)) Jump into FUN. Jump into DANCE. What you waiting for? [sic]". Further posts leading up to the song's released included more teasers and also the song's single cover, which featured an outfit made of Air Jordan 4 sneakers. The outfit was made by Cierra Boyd, who previously made similar looks for the likes of Cardi B, Kat Graham and Kim Petras amongst others. The look from the cover art had been teased by Ciara a few days prior during a brief video on Instagram.

== Music video ==
=== Background and concept ===
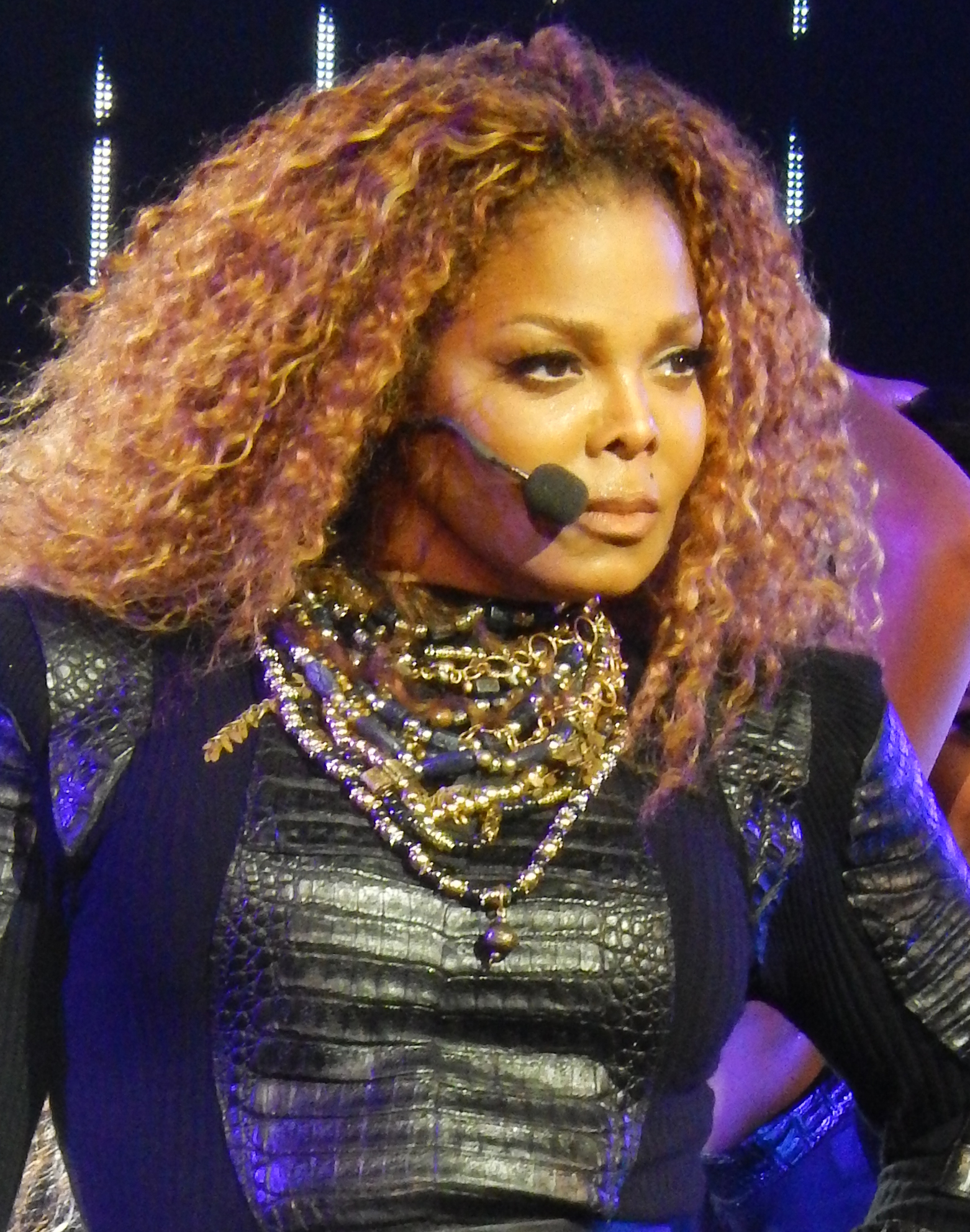
Janet Jackson (pictured above) was said to be the inspiration behind some of the looks and dances in "Jump".

A music video for "Jump" was directed by Dave Meyers, who Ciara previously worked with on Missy Elliott's "Lose Control" (2005) and her own "Dance Like We're Making Love" (2015). The music video premiered on July 8, 2022, at 12PM EST. Describing the moment the video premiered, Ciara said "this moment is special for so many reasons… just considering the timing of where we've all been in this world, this time of creativity for me", going on to describe dance as a universal language, and wanting to make people dance and have the best time while listening to the song. The video features no fewer than 14 outfits/looks, with Ciara stating it was the most work and effort she had put into a music video. Some of the looks drew comparisons to Janet Jackson and the video was filmed across four days. According to Vibe, the video high energy and paid tribute to a number of Ciara's own "iconic dance moves" and looks, including recreating a scene dancing atop a car from her 2010 song "Ride". The Winston-Salem State University Powerhouse Red & White cheerleading squad also feature in the music video. The group flew out to Los Angeles to film for the music video and praised Ciara and her team for how the squad were treated; each squad member was assigned a crew member to look after them on set. Speaking about how the squad became involved in the video, one of their coaches NeSheila Washington explained that one of Ciara's dancers spotted the squad on Instagram, before sending a message via the app to say "they would be a great fit for the song".

=== Synopsis ===
The video opens with a scene of Ciara chanting the song's chorus and performing a cheer routine with the WSSU 'Powerhouse of Red and White Cheerleaders'. During this segment, the group chant: "You like it when I make that thang jump, You go Wow when I make that thing jump/ It get loud when I make that thing jump, It’s a party when I make that thing jump." Across 14 looks, Ciara dances across multiple scenes including "dancing through the roof", "moving trains" and "power lines". Following the cheer scene, the music video jumps to Ciara in red curly hair, twerking "in a parking lot full of low riders" before transitioning to a rooftop scene featuring Ciara in "an all black-ensemble in knee-high sneakers", recreating the "Ciara walk" from her "Goodies" music video (2004). The fourth scene finds Ciara dancing on an electrical wire in a set consisting of loose-fitting trousers, a white crop top, trench coat, and bucket hat, with a silver chain necklace and white sneakers.

The next scene features Ciara as a daytime "1, 2 Step" dance instructor, shouting, "They can't jump with us, can't mess with us, drop that ass girl! Make 'em say 'wow!' Drop that ass girl, make it clap loud. Let's go!" before her and women perform aerobics to the song's chorus. In the next scene, Ciara dances at the beach in a taupe swimsuit, supported by dancers in similar attire. The next scene features Ciara dancing on top of car, which she noted as a reference to her video for "Oh" in 2005. It is followed by a scene in which "her hair turned into sparkler candles as she whipped it around in a black bikini top and latex pants."

Subsequent scenes feature Ciara dancing in the street in football uniform and then performing with Coast Contra during their verse, "surrounded by 4-wheelers". The next scene features Ciara and dancers in an alley while objects float around them. The video concludes with Ciara in a Canadian tuxedo-inspired outfit, dancing atop a freight train.

=== Reception ===
Amber Corrine from Vibe praised the music video for being a visual experience and event, "'Jump' brings us back to the days when music videos actually felt like an experience. From a 14-outfit wardrobe change to epic scenery, choreographed dance routines, coupled with captivating graphic effects." Fellow artist, British singer Sam Smith gave the song a positive review having watched the video upon its release; Smith said "I just saw the 'JUMP' video. I’m trying not to swear right now. [Laughs] Unbelievable! Unbelievable. Amazing. [Points to fans] You are going to die! Insane, insane! Ugh!".

== Credits and personnel ==
Song credits

Adapted from Tidal.

- Rachel Blum – assistant audio mixer
- Ciara – lead vocals, producer
- Coast Contra – featured vocals
- DJ Riggins – assistant audio mixer
- Jaycen Joshua – engineer, mixer
- Andrew "Andy" Park – engineer
- Jacob Richards – assistant audio mixer
- Mike Seaberg – additional audio mixer
- Sam Small – producer, programmer
- Sam Sumser – producer, programmer
- Theron Thomas – producer, programmer

Music video credits

Adapted from YouTube.

- Nathan Adams – tailor
- Tevin Allen – assistant coach (WSSU)
- Stephen Bielecki – producer
- Monika Breg – producer
- Oth'than Burnside – stylist (for Coast Contra, and hip-hop segment)
- Storm Debarge – freestyle dancer
- Bianca Delone Brewton – dancer
- Lindsay Ducos – dancer
- Kollin Carter – lead wardrobe stylist
- Ciara – creative direction, editor
- Scott Cunningham – director of photography
- Jamaica Craft – creative direction, lead choreographer
- Stephanie Desiree – tailor
- Yolanda Frederick-Thompson – make-up artist (for Ciara)
- Saya Fukushi – manicurist assistant
- Anthony Gilbert – dancer
- Brianna Gret – freestyle dancer
- Marc Inniss – dancer
- Lord Fin – freestyle dancer
- Jeff Malen – sound mixer
- Kyvon McFashion – stylist assistant (for Coast Contra and hip-hop segment)
- Dave Meyers – director
- Franceleslia Millien – wardrobe assistant
- Mod Creations – post-production effects
- Erina Nogushi – manicurist assistant
- Rafael Nsar – make-up assistant
- Miho Okawara – manicurist (for Ciara)
- Tom Paolantonio – sound mixer
- Ahsia Pettigrew – dancer
- Cesar Deleon Ramirez – hairstylist (for Ciara)
- Trinity Ringer – dancer
- Tacir Robertson – dancer
- Candace Savage – dancer
- Nathan Scherrer – executive producer
- Arthur Pa'yton Silver – club cardio
- Zeandre Simpson – wardrobe assistant
- Josh Smith – choreographer, dancer
- Stefan Sonnenfeld – colorist
- Jai Shukla – editor
- Kenny Taylor – 1st assistant director
- Taylor Terry – choreographer, dancer
- Les Umberger – VFX supervisor
- Destiny Vaughn – choreographer, dancer
- Alaini Walker – dancer
- Nesheila Washington – head cheer coach (Powerhouse of Red & White WSSU)
- Terry Watson – set design
- Todd Williamson – choreographer
- Winston-Salem State University (WSSU) – powerhouse cheerleaders
- Airi Yamada – manicurist assistant
- Morgan Yamamoto – stylist assistant (for Coast Contra and hip-hop segment)

== Charts ==
Chart (2022)	Peak position
US R&B/Hip-Hop Digital Songs (Billboard)	12

== Release history ==
Release history for "Jump"
Region	Date	Format	Label	Ref.
Various	July 8, 2022	Digital download; streaming	Beauty Marks; Uptown; Republic	
