= Beauty Marks (album) =

Studio album by Ciara
- Released: May 10, 2019
- Recorded: 2017–2019
- Studios: Sphere Studios (London); Rocco's Castle; Beauty Marks Studios; Neptune Valley (Los Angeles); Space Primates Palace
- Genres: Pop; R&B
- Length: 40:03
- Label: Beauty Marks
- Producers: Jasper Cameron; Rod Cameron; Benny Cassette; Maejor; Skylar Grey; Rodney "Darkchild" Jerkins; J. Pierre Medor; Moonbeat; J. R. Rotem; Space Primates; Tricky Stewart

Ciara chronology
Jackie (2015)	Beauty Marks (2019)	CiCi (2023)

Singles from Beauty Marks
- 1. "Level Up" Released: July 18, 2018; 2. "Freak Me" Released: August 10, 2018; 3. "Dose" Released: September 14, 2018; 4. "Greatest Love" Released: February 12, 2019; 5. "Thinkin Bout You" Released: March 29, 2019

Beauty Marks is the seventh studio album by American singer Ciara. It was released on May 10, 2019, through her own independent label, Beauty Marks Entertainment with distribution from Alternative Distribution Alliance. It is her first album since Jackie (2015). The album was preceded by five singles "Level Up", "Freak Me", "Dose", "Greatest Love" and "Thinkin Bout You".

== Background ==
After the release of her sixth studio album, Jackie (2015), Ciara decided to leave Epic Records in early 2016. Although the album spawned the Platinum-certified single, "I Bet", it failed to make much of a commercial impact, selling only around 160,000 copies worldwide within a three-month period. The singer had planned to further promote the album with a second leg of the Jackie Tour in March 2016, after postponing the dates from November 2015; however, on February 27, 2016, Ciara announced that the remaining dates of the tour had been cancelled and that she'd instead focus on recording her seventh studio album, while expressing that the album would see her undertaking a new musical direction. On January 27, 2017, it was announced that Ciara had signed a new recording contract with Warner Bros. Records. As a part of the deal, Ciara began working on her seventh studio album and shot a music video for its lead single, "Level Up", in 2017. Ciara quietly departed the label later that year. The departure followed a period of creative tension between the artist and the label, particularly surrounding the release of her empowering single, Level Up. Despite Ciara's passion for the track and its potential to resonate with her fanbase, Warner hesitated to release it, prompting her to take control of her artistic vision.

I had to meet with the new CEO, and I had my game plan. I had this song called 'Level Up.' I had the video for this song as well. I had a whole vision for my project, and I sat down, and I talked to him, to the CEO at that time,” she says. “Like you know, once the meeting was over, and I knew he didn't want to go forward with my project, I was like, this is my chance and I'm going to ask back for my masters...I'm literally going to level up.

The record label ended up returning them to Ciara for free.

In 2017, Ciara launched her own record and entertainment company, Beauty Marks Entertainment (BME); the venture was launched for her to follow her own creative direction and release her music on her own terms, with the singer eventually hoping to sign additional artists. BME's first endeavor was the release of the singles "Level Up", "Freak Me", and "Dose" in 2018, while Ciara officially announced its formation on February 7, 2019, at the MAKERS Conference.

On March 28, 2019, Ciara announced that her seventh studio album would be titled Beauty Marks after her label and that it would be released on May 10, 2019. The album was made available for pre-order the following day, along with its fifth single, "Thinkin' Bout You". In speaking on the album's development process, Ciara expressed that she now feels as she did at the start of her career, stating:

I was this young girl excited to be living my dreams and having the best time. I'm back to that phase again.

Ciara revealed that she co-wrote the title track "Beauty Marks" with Skylar Grey.

== Singles ==
"Level Up" was released via digital download and through streaming platforms on July 18, 2018, as the album's lead single, alongside a high-octane music video. The single peaked at 59 on the US Billboard Hot 100 and at 23 on the US Hot R&B/Hip-Hop Songs chart, while its music video inspired the viral "level up dance challenge". Ciara also challenged fans to share three ways that they hoped to "level up" in life in promotion of the single. The song was certified Platinum by the RIAA. With the success of "Level Up", Ciara released the album's second single, "Freak Me", featuring Nigerian rapper, Tekno, less than a month later on August 10, 2018. The single peaked at 22 on the US R&B/Hip-Hop Digital Songs Chart.

"Dose" was released as the album's third single on September 14, 2018, after premiering on ESPN’s Monday Night Football halftime show. The song's music video premiered on October 25, 2018 (Ciara's 33rd birthday). The single peaked at 7 on the US R&B Digital Songs Sales chart. The album's fourth single, "Greatest Love", was released alongside its music video on February 11, 2019, to coincide with Valentine's Day. The single peaked at 21 on the US R&B Digital Songs Sales chart.

"Thinkin Bout You" was released as the fifth single on March 29, 2019, along with the album's pre-order. Its music video premiered that same day. The single peaked at 20 on the US R&B/Hip-Hop Digital Songs Chart.

Ciara released a music video for the album's title track on May 11, 2019 and one for the album's third track, "Set", on June 14, 2019. Despite not being released as a single, the title track peaked at 22 on the R&B Digital Songs Sales chart.

== Critical reception ==
Professional ratings
Aggregate scores
Source	Rating
Metacritic	57/100
Review scores
Source	Rating
AllMusic	2.5/5 stars
NME	3/5 stars
Pitchfork	6.5/10
Spectrum Culture	3/5
Spin	mixed
Time	positive

Beauty Marks received generally mixed reviews from music critics. At Metacritic, which assigns a normalized rating out of 100 to reviews from mainstream critics, the album received an average score of 57, based on 4 reviews. Andy Kellman, writing for AllMusic, noted that Ciara "retreads just about every move she has made before," and praised the ballads for "easily prevail[ing] over the up-tempo numbers, not one of which is a match for the singer's previous dancefloor conquests." In his Spin review, Alfred Soto called the album "mediocre", but remarked that "[it] manages to land in the middle of Ciara's discography when boldness is required." Nick Levine rated the album with 3 out of 5 stars, claiming that "[t]hough ‘Beauty Marks’ is rarely innovative, Ciara shows a respectable amount of range throughout the record. During his review for Pitchfork, Eric Torres perceived that "despite a handful of highlights, Beauty Marks is marred by filler, moving between frothy pop-R&B and stale empowerment anthems that leave Ciara's talents largely underused." In a more positive note, Steven J. Horowitz praised the album's themes of happiness and contentment, claiming that they "suit her well, as does her newfound openness. This is the Ciara that we deserve, and that she deserves too."

== Commercial performance ==
The album debuted at number 87 on the US Billboard 200 and number 48 on the Top R&B/Hip-Hop Albums chart. As of May 2019, the album has sold over 135,000 equivalent album units globally.

== Track listing ==
All songs were written by Ciara. Additional writers are noted below.

No.	Title	Writer(s)	Producer(s)	Length
1.	"I Love Myself" (featuring Macklemore)	Benny Cassette; Benjamin Haggerty; Clara Calaway; Kimberly Perry	Cassette^{[a]}; Ciara^{[a]}; Tyler Dopps^{[a]}	5:28
2.	"Level Up"	Theron Thomas; Jonathon "J.R. Rotem"; Telly Brown Jr.	Rotem^{[a]}; Ciara^{[a]}	3:24
3.	"Set"	Thomas; Dallas Caton	Moonbeat; Ciara^{[a]}; Andy D. Park^{[a]}	2:56
4.	"Thinkin Bout You"	Ester Dean; Marc Sibley; Nathan Cunningham	Space Primates; Ciara^{[a]}; Park^{[a]}	3:48
5.	"Trust Myself"	Colby Green; Brandon Green	Maejor; Ciara^{[a]}; C. Green^{[a]}	3:38
6.	"Girl Gang" (featuring Kelly Rowland)	J. Pierre Medor; Christopher "Tricky" Stewart; C. Green	Medor; Tricky Stewart; Ciara^{[a]}; Park^{[a]}; Rowland^{[a]}; Kyle Coleman^{[a]}	3:19
7.	"Dose"	Rodney Jerkins; Carmen Reece; Samuel Fischer	Darkchild; Ciara^{[a]}; Park^{[a]}	3:42
8.	"Na Na"	Cassette; Rosina "Soaky" Siren; Kaveh Rastegar; Brandon Coleman; Josh Lopez	Cassette^{[a]}; Ciara^{[a]}	3:08
9.	"Freak Me" (featuring Tekno)	Thomas; Rotem; Tiwatope Savage; Charles Enebeli; Michael Ajereh Collins	Rotem^{[a]}; Ciara^{[a]}	3:20
10.	"Greatest Love"	Thomas; Jasper Cameron; Rod Cameron	J. Cameron; R. Cameron; Ciara^{[a]}; Park^{[a]}	3:43
11.	"Beauty Marks"	Skylar Grey	Grey^{[a]}; Ciara^{[a]}; Eric Ross^{[a]}	3:38
Total length:				40:03

Beauty Marks – Japan CD release bonus track
No.	Title	Writer(s)	Producer(s)	Length
12.	"Level Up (Remix)" (featuring Missy Elliott & Fatman Scoop)	Thomas; Rotem; Elliot; Brown, Jr.; Isaac Freeman III	Rotem	3:49
Total length:				43:52

Notes

- ^{^[a]} signifies a vocal producer, this may be in addition to music production

Sample credits

- "Level Up" contains a sample of the composition "Fuck It Up Challenge" by DJ Telly Tell, written by Telly Brown Jr.
- "Freak Me" contains a sample of the composition "Before NKO" by Tiwa Savage, written by Tiwatope Savage, Charles Enebeli and Michael Ajereh Collins.

== Personnel ==
Credits for Beauty Marks adapted from Allmusic.

=== Studios ===
Recording locations

- Sphere Studios (London) – recording (track 1)
- Rocco's Castle – recording (track 1)
- Beauty Marks Studios – recording (tracks 1, 3, 4, 6, 7, 10, 12)
- Neptune Valley (Los Angeles) – recording (tracks 2, 5, 8, 9)
- Space Primates Palace – recording (track 4)

Mixing locations

- Larrabee Sound Studios (North Hollywood) – mixing (all tracks)

=== Performers and Vocals ===
- Ciara – primary artist, vocals (all tracks), background vocals (tracks 4, 7)
- Macklemore – featured vocals (track 1)
- Kelly Rowland – featured vocals (track 6)
- Tekno – featured vocals (track 9)
- Missy Elliott – featured vocals (track 12 (bonus))
- Fatman Scoop – featured vocals (track 12 (bonus))
- Theron Thomas – background vocals (track 3)
- Marc Sibley – background vocals (track 4)
- Nathan Cunningham – background vocals (track 4)
- Carmen Reece – background vocals (track 7)
- Benny Cassette – synths (track 1)
- Kimberly Perry – wurltizer (track 1)
- Josh Lopez – guitar (track 1)
- J. R. Rotem – keyboard (tracks 2, 12(bonus))
- Space Primates – instruments (track 4)
- Andy D.Park – instruments (track 4)
- Simone Vitucci – cello (track 11)

=== Production ===
- Ciara – executive production, vocal production (all tracks), A&R
- Monti Olson – A&R Partner
- Benny Cassette – production, vocal production (tracks 1, 8)
- Tyler Dopps – vocal production (track 1)
- J.R. Rotem – production, vocal production (tracks 2, 9, 12(bonus))
- Moonbeat – production (track 3)
- Andy D. Park – vocal production (tracks 3–4, 6–7, 10)
- Space Primates – production (track 4)
- Brandon Green – production (track 5)
- Colby Green – vocal production (track 5)
- J. Pierre Medor – production (track 6)
- C. "Tricky" Stewart – production (track 6)
- Kelly Rowland – vocal production (track 6)
- Kyle Coleman – vocal production (track 6)
- Rodney "Darkchild" Jerkins – production (track 7)
- Jasper Cameron – production (track 10)
- Rod Cameron – production (track 10)
- Skylar Grey – production, vocal production (track 11)
- Eric Ross – vocal production (track 11)

=== Technical ===
- Jacob Richards – engineering assistance (tracks 1–7, 9–12)
- Rashawn McLean – engineering assistance (tracks 1–7, 9–12)
- Mike Seaberg – engineering assistance (tracks 1–7, 9–12)
- Benny Cassette – programming, engineering (track 1)
- Andy D. Park – engineering (tracks 1, 3–4, 6–7, 10–11)
- Tyler Dopps – engineering (tracks 1, 3)
- Jaycen Joshua – mixing (tracks 1–7, 9–12(bonus))
- Samuel Kalandjian – engineering (tracks 2, 9, 12(bonus))
- Rodney Jenkins – mixing (tracks 3–4, 7, 9)
- Space Primates – programming, engineering (track 4)
- Chris Szczech – engineering (tracks 5, 8, 11)
- Kyle Coleman – engineering (track 6)
- Derek Keota – engineering (track 7)
- Joseph Hurtado – engineering (track 7)
- Manny Marroquin – mixing (track 8)
- Chris Athens – mastering (all tracks)

=== Artwork ===
- Sasha Samsonova – photography
- Dianne Garcia – styling
- Alejandra Hernandez – styling
- César DeLeön Ramirez – hair
- Yolanda Frederick-Thompson – make-up
- Miho Okawara – nails
- JP Robinson – art direction and design
- Stevie – art direction and design

== Charts ==
Chart (2019)	Peak position
Australian Digital Albums (ARIA)	28
UK Album Downloads (Official Charts)	40
UK R&B Albums (Official Charts)	10
US Billboard 200	87
US Top R&B/Hip-Hop Albums (Billboard)	48
US Independent Albums (Billboard)	6

== Release history ==
Region	Date	Edition	Format	Label	Ref.
Various	May 10, 2019	Standard	Digital download; streaming; CD	Beauty Marks	
Japan	June 5, 2019	Japanese	CD	Warner Music Japan	

== Beauty Marks Tour ==
Beauty Marks Tour
- National tour by Ciara
- Location: U.S., North America
- Associated album: Beauty Marks
- Start date: September 13, 2019
- End date: October 4, 2019
- Legs: 1
- No. of shows: 7 in North America

Ciara concert chronology
- Jackie Tour (2015); Beauty Marks Tour (2019)

The Beauty Marks Tour was the fifth concert tour by American singer Ciara. The tour supported her seventh studio album, Beauty Marks.

=== Background ===
Ciara announced the tour on June 1, 2019, during a performance on Good Morning America.

=== Reception ===
Reviewing the Houston date for the Houston Chronicle, Joey Guerra said that "every song was a renewed blast of energy" and that regardless of whether she was singing her first hits or her newest songs, "it's still an intoxicating sound".

=== Tour dates ===
Date	City	Country	Venue
September 13, 2019	Puyallup	United States	Washington State Fair
September 17, 2019	Los Angeles	United States	The Wiltern
September 24, 2019	Houston	United States	House of Blues
September 26, 2019	Atlanta	United States	Center Stage Theater
September 29, 2019	Silver Spring	United States	The Fillmore
October 1, 2019	New York City	United States	Sony Hall
October 4, 2019	Chicago	United States	Park West

=== Set list ===
1. "Dose"
2. "Set"
3. "Goodies"
4. "That's Right"
5. "Get Up"
6. "Ride"
7. "Oh"
8. "Promise"
9. "And I"
10. "Sorry"
11. "I Bet"
12. "Like a Boy"
13. "Girl Gang"
14. "If"
15. "Freak Me"
16. "Ciara to the Stage"
17. "Like a Surgeon"
18. "Body Party"
19. "Thinkin Bout You"
20. "1, 2 Step"
21. "Tootsee Roll"
22. "Level Up"
