= Forever (Ciara song) =

Single by Ciara featuring Lil Baby

from the EP CiCi
- Released: August 18, 2023
- Genre: R&B
- Length: 2:55
- Label: Beauty Marks
- Songwriters: Ciara Harris; Dominique Jones; William Hood; Chalra Warmley; Timothy Thomas; Kasey Phillips; Theron Thomas
- Producers: Ciara; Jaydot; Precision Productions; Theron Thomas

Ciara singles chronology
"How We Roll" (2023)	"Forever" (2023)

"Forever" is the second single from American singer Ciara's EP, CiCi, which features rapper Lil Baby. The single and official music video were released on August 18, 2023, the same day as the song's parent EP.

== Music video ==
Ciara released the official music video on August 18, 2023. The video was directed by Taj & Jay.

== Chart performance ==
The single debuted and peaked at number 21 on the US Hot R&B Songs and R&B/Hip-Hop Digital Songs charts.

== Charts ==
Chart performance for "Forever"
Chart (2023)	Peak position
US Hot R&B Songs (Billboard)	21
US R&B/Hip-Hop Digital Songs (Billboard)	21
