= Better Thangs =

2022 single by Ciara featuring Summer Walker

Single by Ciara featuring Summer Walker
- Released: September 28, 2022
- Genre: R&B
- Length: 3:34
- Label: Beauty Marks; Uptown; Republic

Ciara singles chronology
"Jump" (2022)	"Better Thangs" (2022)	"Da Girls" (2023)

Summer Walker singles chronology
"No Love" (2022)	"Better Thangs" (2022)

"Better Thangs" is a song by American singer Ciara featuring Summer Walker. It was released on September 28, 2022, through Beauty Marks, Uptown and Republic as the intended second single to her eighth studio album CiCi, but was not included on the final track list.

== Critical reception ==
Tallie Spencer of Billboard described the song as a "feel-good, uptempo R&B anthem". Tomás Mier of Rolling Stone described the song as "sunshine-kissed". Rachel Brodsky of Stereogum described the song as "sunshiny". David Renshaw of The Fader described the song as "mood-boosting".

== Promotion ==
Ciara previewed a snippet of the song via TikTok on August 4, 2022. A remix for the song featuring American rapper GloRilla was released on November 4, 2022.

== Charts ==
Chart performance for "Better Thangs"
Chart (2023)	Peak position
US R&B/Hip-Hop Airplay (Billboard)	35
