= Da Girls =

2023 single by Ciara

Single by Ciara
- Released: March 24, 2023
- Length: 3:44
- Label: Beauty Marks
- Composers: Brad Feeny; Derrick Milano; Jason Cornet; Joshua Parker; Michael Woods; Naquan Reece; Terrence Williams
- Lyricists: Ciara Harris; Theron Thomas; Layton Greene
- Producers: Derrick Milano; OG Parker; Romano; Tenroc; Woods

Ciara singles chronology
"Better Thangs" (2022)	"Da Girls" (2023)	"Slow" (2023)

"Da Girls" is a song by American singer Ciara. It was released on March 24, 2023, through label Beauty Marks.

== Background and release ==
In March 2023, Ciara announced that her next single, following "Better Thangs" with Summer Walker, would be "Da Girls" and would be released on March 24, 2023. "Da Girls" has been described as a female empowerment song.

== Music video ==
The official music video for "Da Girls" was released on March 24, 2023, and was directed by Sara Lacombe.

== Remixes ==
Ciara recruited Lola Brooke and Lady London for the first remix, the Girls Mix. It was released on April 14, 2023. An official music video was released on the same day.

On May 12, 2023, Ciara released a Versions EP featuring the original version of "Da Girls", plus two new remixes: the Slow Mix featuring Derrick Milano and the Dance Mix featuring Lay Bankz.

== Chart performance ==
The original, solo version of "Da Girls" debuted at number 20 on Billboards' R&B/Hip Hop Digital Song Sales Chart.

== Personnel ==
Credits adapted from Spotify.

Producers

- Derrick Milano
- Joshua Parker
- Romano
- Tenroc
- Michael Woods

== Track listings ==
Original

1. "Da Girls" – 3:44

Girls Mix

1. "Da Girls" (Girls Mix) (featuring Lola Brooke and Lady London) – 3:04

Versions

1. "Da Girls" (Dance Mix) (featuring Lay Bankz) - 2:26
2. "Da Girls" (Slow Mix) (featuring Derrick Milano) - 3:09
3. "Da Girls" – 3:44

== Charts ==
Chart (2023)	Peak position
US R&B/Hip-Hop Digital Songs (Billboard)	20

== Release history ==
Release history for "Da Girls"
Region	Date	Version	Format	Label	Ref.
Various	March 24, 2023	Original	Digital download; streaming	Beauty Marks	
Various	April 14, 2023	Girls Mix	Digital download; streaming	Beauty Marks	
Various	May 12, 2023	Versions	Digital download; streaming	Beauty Marks	
