= Level Up (Ciara song) =

2018 single by Ciara

Single by Ciara

from the album Beauty Marks
- Released: July 17, 2018
- Studio: Neptune Valley (Los Angeles)
- Genre: Jersey club; electronic
- Length: 3:24
- Label: Beauty Marks
- Songwriters: Ciara; Theron Thomas; J. R. Rotem; Telly Brown Jr.
- Producer: J.R. Rotem

Ciara singles chronology
"Get Up" (2016)	"Level Up" (2018)	"Freak Me" (2018)

Music video
- "Level Up" on YouTube

"Level Up" is a song by American singer-songwriter Ciara released on July 17, 2018, through her independent label, Beauty Marks Entertainment. The single artwork was shot by Haley Blavka.

Influenced by the Jersey club variety of electronic dance music, the song was written by Ciara, J. R. Rotem, Theron Thomas, Telly Brown Jr. and Theron Feemster, with production by J.R. Rotem and Nas Luke. It samples the Jersey Remix of "We Are Young" by Fun. that was also used in DJ Telly Tellz's 2017 viral hit "Fuck It Up Challenge". Its music video was directed and choreographed by New Zealand dancer Parris Goebel, who also appears in the video alongside fellow New Zealanders ReQuest Dance Crew.

Reception to the music video was positive, with "Level Up" becoming the number one trending video on YouTube and spawning the #LevelUpChallenge on social media, featuring fans and celebrities recording their own version of the video's choreography. The official remix for "Level Up" was released a week later featuring additional vocals from Missy Elliott and Fatman Scoop. Chartwise, "Level Up" peaked within the upper half of the US Hot R&B/Hip-Hop Songs chart in the United States, top forty in Hungary and top sixty on the US Billboard Hot 100.

== Composition ==
"Level Up" is a song about empowerment and growth. The song's title directly references Ciara's controversial #LevelUp marriage tweet, which some felt blamed women for being single. She later cleared up the message, explaining that she wanted to empower women as she felt her "lowest moment" as a solo parent before learning to love herself. Some critics also believed parts of the song were aimed at ex-fiancé, American rapper Future.

== Promotion ==
In promotion of the single, fans initiated the "Level Up Challenge", which generated hundreds of thousands of responses on social media. The challenge consisted of fans mimicking the choreography performed in the accompanying music video. Ciara added onto the challenge by encouraging fans to share three ways in which they want to "level up" or better themselves. Fans and celebrities alike participated in the challenge, including Chris Pratt, Kelly Clarkson, Serena Williams, Macklemore, Janelle Monáe, Missy Elliott, Jennifer Hudson, and Ciara's husband, Russell Wilson. Ciara also performed the song as a part of her set list as an opening act for singer, Bruno Mars' 24K Magic World Tour (2018).

=== Remix ===
On July 26, 2018, Ciara premiered the song's official remix, featuring Missy Elliott and Fatman Scoop. The three of them previously worked together on Elliott's single "Lose Control".

== Chart performance ==
In the United States, "Level Up" debuted at 77 on the US Billboard Hot 100 on July 31, 2018, for the chart week dated August 4, 2018; it ascended to number 59 the following week. It debuted at number 10 on the US Digital Songs chart that same week, becoming Ciara's sixth top-ten hit on the chart and first since "Love Sex Magic" in March 2009.

== Music video ==
The music video for "Level Up" was filmed in 2017 but initially went unreleased as Ciara's contract with Warner Bros. Records was terminated. It eventually premiered, alongside the single, on July 18, 2018. The video, which features the New Zealand dancers of ReQuest Dance Crew, was directed and choreographed by New Zealander Parris Goebel, who also appears as a dancer. The music video was filmed in the Auckland War Memorial Museum in Auckland. Ciara premiered a "Behind the Scenes" video through Trace Me on August 6, 2018.

The dance-centric clip opens with the words: "Be your own boss, love yourself, get up and dance. Level up!". Then Ciara dances while wearing headphones and a black leotard with the words "Level Up", accompanied by the all-female Request Dance Crew, dressed in matching red activewear and Bose headphones.

=== Reception ===
The music video received a positive critical response. Spin magazine's Israel Daramola opined "Choreographed by dancer Parris Goebel, Ciara and ReQuest put on an electric, mesmerizing performance and make it look easy." Within 24 hours of release, it became the #1 trending video on YouTube.

== Live performances ==
Ciara has performed the song on the American Music Awards of 2018 and on The Ellen DeGeneres Show. The song is also performed on Bruno Mars' 24K Magic World Tour, where Ciara serves as an opening act.

== Track listing ==
- Digital download
1. "Level Up" – 3:24
- Digital download – remix
1. "Level Up" (remix featuring Missy Elliott and Fatman Scoop) – 3:49

== Personnel ==
- Chris Athens — Mastered
- Ciara — vocal producer
- Jaycen Joshua - mixed
- Samuel Kalandjian — engineer
- Rashawn McLean — assistant mixer
- Jacob Richards — assistant mixer
- J.R. Rotem — keyboards, producer, vocal producer
- Mike Seaberg — assistant mixer

== Charts ==
Chart (2018–2019)	Peak position
Belgium (Ultratip Bubbling Under Flanders)	34
Belgium Urban (Ultratop Flanders)	27
Hungary (Single Top 40)	36
France (SNEP)	88
New Zealand Hot Singles (RMNZ)	7
Slovakia Singles Digital (ČNS IFPI)	42
UK Singles Downloads (Official Charts)	79
US Billboard Hot 100	59
US Hot R&B/Hip-Hop Songs (Billboard)	23

== Certifications ==
Region	Certification	Certified units/sales
New Zealand (RMNZ)	Platinum	30,000^{‡}
Poland (ZPAV)	Gold	25,000^{‡}
United Kingdom (BPI)	Silver	200,000^{‡}
United States (RIAA)	2× Platinum	2,000,000^{‡}
^{‡} Sales+streaming figures based on certification alone.

=== Remix ===
Region	Certification	Certified units/sales
France (SNEP)	Gold	100,000^{‡}
^{‡} Sales+streaming figures based on certification alone.
