= I Bet =

Single by Ciara

from the album Jackie
- Released: January 26, 2015
- Recorded: 2014
- Genre: Pop; R&B
- Length: 4:47
- Label: Epic
- Songwriters: Ciara; Harmony "H-Money" Samuels; Timothy Thomas; Theron Thomas
- Producers: Harmony Samuels; Chris "TEK" O'Ryan

Ciara singles chronology
"Overdose" (2013)	"I Bet" (2015)	"Dance like We're Making Love" (2015)

Music video
- "I Bet" on YouTube

"I Bet" is a song by American singer Ciara from her sixth studio album, Jackie (2015). Released as the lead single from the album by Epic Records on January 26, 2015, "I Bet" serves as Ciara's first single following the birth of her first child and widely publicized break-up with American rapper Future. The song was written by the singer, Harmony "H-Money" Samuels and Timothy and Theron Thomas of the production duo Rock City. It was produced by Samuels, and Chris "TEK" O'Ryan was responsible for its vocal production.

Developed as a "raw" and emotional track originating from a personal place in Ciara's life, "I Bet" was intended to resonate as "much bigger than any one person's experience". A slow-tempo, somber R&B ballad—with sparse, throwback 1990s-style R&B production—"I Bet" shifts from the sound of the singer's later discography to recall her earlier works, "And I" (2005) and "Promise" (2006). The track's lyrical content deal with subjects of betrayal, trust issues and infidelity in a romantic relationship.

"I Bet" was well received by music critics who deemed it a strong comeback for the singer, and commended her vocal range, as well its rare and honest showcase of her private life. Described as a realest, scathing breakup song, a variety of publications opined that the ballad was written about Ciara's break-up with Future as a diss track, and noted that it was the first time the singer weighed in on their split. Upon its release the song debuted at number 96 on the US Billboard Hot 100 and peaked at number 43.

Three official remixes have been released – one featuring T.I., another featuring Joe Jonas and a dance remix by Dutch DJ R3hab with additional vocals added for R3hab's remix.

== Background ==
Following the release of her self-titled fifth studio album in July 2013 and her engagement to American rapper Future, Ciara revealed to W in April 2014 that her sixth studio album would be predominantly inspired by her then-fiancé. Named after the rapper, the singer gave birth to her first child, Future Zahir Wilburn on May 19, 2014. After claims of Future's infidelity during their relationship had surfaced, it was reported that the couple's engagement had been called off. Following their very public break-up, Ciara's album release was further postponed to 2015, and during this time the singer "quietly" recorded new music, while concentrating on motherhood.

"I Bet" was co-written by Ciara, Harmony "H-Money" Samuels, and Timothy and Theron Thomas of Rock City. Samuels produced the track with Chris "TEK" O'Ryan handling its vocal production. "I Bet" was engineered by O'Ryan with the assistance of Carlos King, Ryan Kaul and Maddox Chim. While Jaycen Joshua and Dave Kutch were responsible for its mixing and mastering respectively. Developed as a "raw" and emotional track which originates from a personal place in Ciara's life, she wrote the song with the intention to resonate with her listeners as "much bigger than any one person's experience". Ciara felt that the experience of recording the track "truly fulfilled her" at the time, and saw "I Bet" as a manifestation of a renewed artist with a renewed attitude.

== Release ==
On January 13, 2015, music website All Access announced the name of the single in their radio format release schedule. The song's planned release to rhythmic contemporary and urban contemporary radio, resulted in media speculating that "I Bet" would recall the works of Ciara's last two lead singles, "Ride" (2010) and "Body Party" (2013). Mike Wass of Idolator observed: "She could also be going for a multi-format release—with one track sent to urban radio and another being serviced to pop stations. That could be one way of returning the 29-year-old to her early 2000s dominance". Other critics noted the length of Ciara's musical hiatus prior to the release of "I Bet", with The BoomBox commenting, "It seems like ages since Ciara's bedroom banger 'Body Party'". The same day, it was revealed that Samuels had produced "I Bet" which critics felt was "somewhat surprising," considering Ciara's previous studio sessions with producer Dr. Luke which garnered widespread media coverage.

"I Bet" then received a surprise premiere online by Billboard later that evening. Following its premiere, publications noted that the release of the song was reminiscent of Ciara's 2012 single "Sorry", which also served as a comeback for the singer in the form of a ballad. The single's cover artwork, a black-and-white close-up of Ciara's face, was first posted on Instagram by the singer also on January 13, 2015. The artwork was shot during a photoshoot for L'Uomo Vogue with whom Ciara partnered with for the release of "I Bet". The track serves as the lead single from Ciara's upcoming sixth studio album, Jackie, and was released by Epic Records as a digital download on January 26, 2015. The song was then solicited to rhythmic and urban contemporary radio in the United States with an impact date of January 27, 2015. "I Bet" was made available on streaming media the same day. Several acoustic snippets of the track alongside visuals from the singer's shoot with L'Uomo Vogue were also released on January 27.

== Composition ==
"I Bet"
A 20-second sample of "I Bet", featuring Ciara singing the track's chorus hook, accompanied by acoustic and piano-laden production, and complemented with a throwback style, R&B ballad sound.

"I Bet" is a slow-tempo, somber, R&B ballad. Comprising snapping snares and canned synths, it is accompanied by throwback 1990s-style R&B production, and includes the use of string and keyboard instrumentation, and a steady beat. A quiet, contemplative and deeply personal record, "I Bet" moves away from the sound of Ciara's later discography and recalls some of her earlier work, namely "And I" (2005), and "Promise" (2006). Samuels' piano-laden, acoustic-driven, sparse production allowed Ciara to solicit a venting, passionate vocal in the song. The track features prominent background ad-libs by its co-writer, Theron Thomas, which were noted to share similarities with the works of Future. The vocal range displayed by Ciara on "I Bet" spans two octaves, from the low note of (Eb3) up to the belted note of (Eb5).

The lyrical content in "I Bet" are based on subjects of betrayal, trust issues and infidelity in a romantic relationship. They are aimed at an ex-lover who took Ciara for granted, and see her relive a relationship gone awry. "I Bet" also details a story about life in the public eye. Described as a realest, scathing breakup song, its content feature the singer making a stand to tell-off an ex-lover for not appreciating her. "I Bet" goes through the motions of feeling bitter, by acting as a callout of her former love interest's new girlfriend, manifested in the line, "Is that your bitch over there givin' me the ugly stare / The one with the silicone ass and the Brazilian hair". Despite her ex-lover's wrongdoings, Ciara admits she still loves him, namely in the lyric, "I'm singing this song 'cause I love you… Right now it's killing me 'cause now I have to find someone else when all I wanted was you". The track's hook serves as a revelation that the singer's former lover will want her back, manifested in the lines, "I bet you start loving me / As soon as I start loving someone else / Somebody better than you / I bet you start needing me / As soon as you see me with someone else / Somebody other than you". Later in the song, it is revealed that in the situation, Ciara is not as boastful as the chorus would suggest; and tells a story of the pain of finding a new lover when her future was planned with her former one.

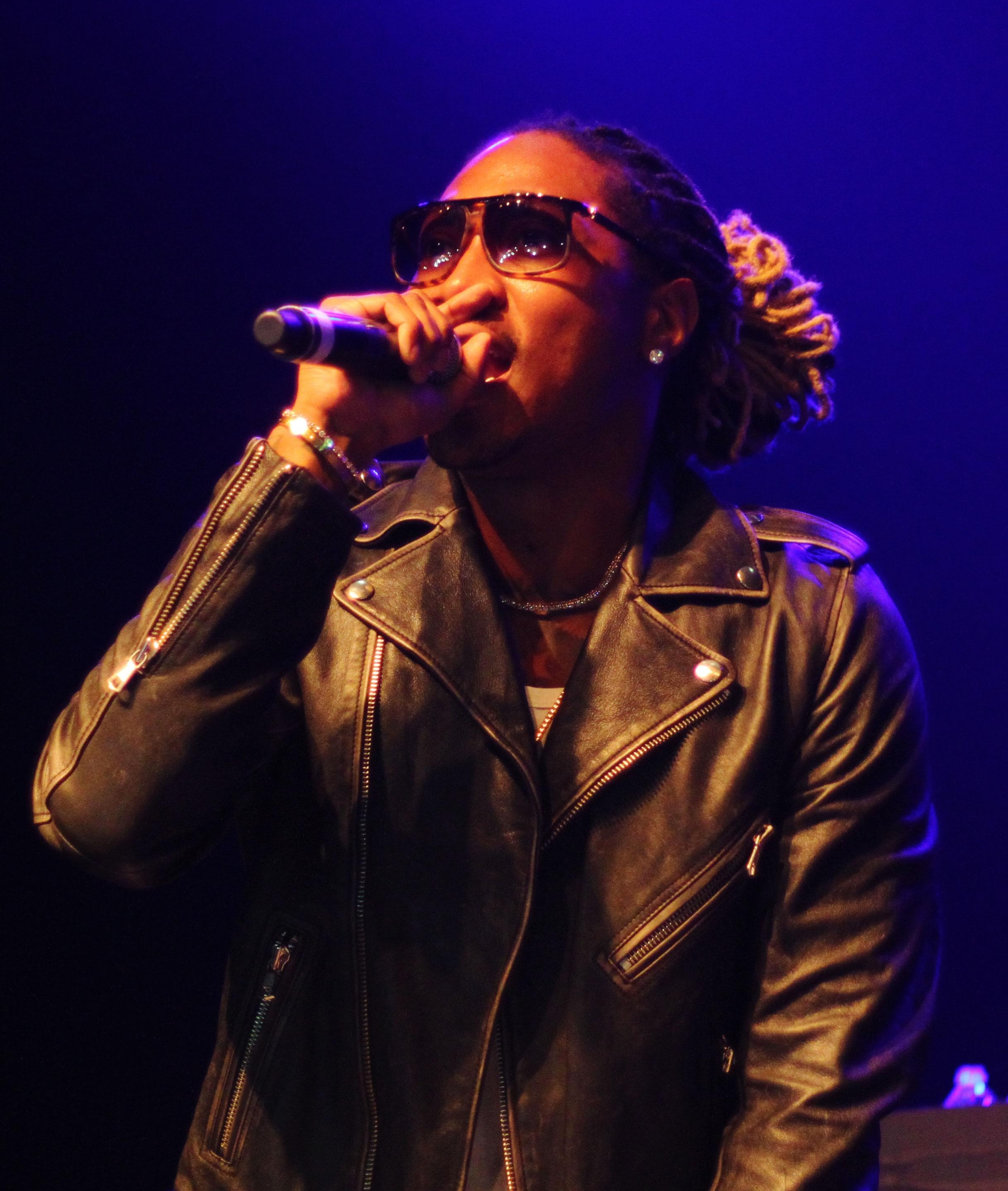
Several publications opined that "I Bet" was written about Ciara's widely publicized break-up with American rapper Future.

Regarding the subject of the track's lyrics, a number of journalists opined that they were based on Future, and in part insulted him as a diss track. Some critics noted that "I Bet" was the first time the Ciara weighed in on her break-up with Future, and wrote that the track "bit back at Future" and was essentially Ciara's take on their split. Referring to "I Bet" and Future's "Just like Bruddas", Stereogum's Tim Breihan observed: "Future and Ciara were the two halves of one of rap and R&B's greatest power couples. But now, their ugly public breakup has reached the point where they're both writing songs about it". Rap-Up mentioned, "a hurt CiCi sings about a lover who did her wrong, much like her ex-fiancé Future". The lyrics in "I Bet" were described by radio station WKYS as telling a very clear story of Ciara's feelings towards Future. While Larry Fitzmaurice of The Fader noted that the track's cutting lyrics also depicted that there was no love lost between Ciara and Future, and opined that the lines—"I mean, I would stay if you could tell the truth / But you can't / No matter how much time I ask"—served as a "seriously withering burn" in the former couple's relationship. Other critics opined that "I Bet" showcased Ciara as self-assured and working through her past relationship. Ciara has not confirmed or denied how "I Bet" was inspired by her relationship with Future, despite the personal weight that the track carries.

== Critical reception ==
"I Bet" received praise from music critics. Erika Ramirez of Billboard felt that "I Bet" was a strong comeback for the singer. Exclaim! journalist Josiah Hughes praised Ciara's "excellent vocal delivery" and called the track "a likely hit". The song was deemed "bold," "sumptuous" and "Ciara's most memorable song in years" by Melissa Ruggieri of The Atlanta Journal-Constitution. Ruggieri went on to opine that "I Bet" "will surely inspire plenty of chatter," and quipped, "Ciara is back, and she's not messing around". British magazine Fact wrote, "Ciara's not mincing her words on her new single". Carolyn Menyes of the Music Times described the track's chorus as "universal" and felt the song was "stunning" and "some of her best music in years". Complex's Justin Davis commended Samuels' production on the track for providing Ciara with "plenty of instrumentation to show off her impressive vocal range". Maria Sherman of Fuse said, "If you need a new heartbreak anthem, you've found it here". Digital Spy's Lewis Corner and Amy Davidson described the ballad as "a nice and smooth introduction of what's to come," adding, "['I Bet' is] a soft launch of sorts, suitably hyping us up for what is still to come". Nolan Feeney of Time commented, "Let's hope the Jackie album campaign has more luck than her personal life [because 'I Bet'] deserves better".

The track received a mixed review from Idolator's Bianca Gracie who opined that the track failed to provide the "expected punch" reminiscent in the singer's 2013 single "I'm Out". However, she commended the song for showcasing "a more honest side to the often-private singer". Emily Tan of The BoomBox shared Gracie's view, writing, "Since [Ciara's] known to be on the private side, we're pleased to hear her get in touch with her emotions here". Feministing's Clover Hope wrote: "This isn't super hit status, but it's... Ciara. Good job Ciara." Simarly to Stereogum's Breihan, Lindsey Weber of New York Magazine compared "I Bet" with Future's break-up song, "Just like Bruddas". She opined that Future's version of the story was "just awful," and Ciara's "less so, although still pretty biting". Weber went on to conclude her review, writing: "But isn't success the best revenge? Too bad 'I Bet' isn't much of a banger." Breihan, however, deemed the ballad "a triumphant, badass single," where Ciara sounds "less robotic than ever".

== Accolades ==
Publication	Country	Accolade
Spin	The 63 Best Songs of 2015 So Far	13
Spin	The 101 Best Songs of 2015	58

== Commercial performance ==
On January 23, 2015, "I Bet" debuted at number 12 on Billboard Top Twitter Tracks, marking Ciara's first entry on the chart. According to Next Big Sound, its debut was contributed by the 1.8 million views the song's audio received on YouTube in its first week. Following its rhythmic contemporary impact date in the United States on January 27, 2015, "I Bet" became the second most-added single on the format with 25 adds in its first day. The song debuted at 96 on the US Billboard Hot 100 on February 14, 2015; it also debuted at 50 on the US Hot R&B/Hip-Hop Airplay chart and at 27 on the US Hot R&B/Hip-Hop Songs chart. On March 20, 2015, it re-entered the US Billboard Hot 100 at 95. The following week, "I Bet" climbed 52 spots from 95 to 43 on the Hot 100, while also entering the US Streaming Songs chart at 28 and the US Digital Songs chart at 37, with most of its gains attributed to the release of its video. "I Bet" was certified Platinum by the Recording Industry Association of America (RIAA) for sales of over one million units in December 2015 and was the only female R&B song released in 2015 to earn this achievement. "I Bet" is Ciara's sixteenth top 50 hit on the US Billboard Hot 100, since "Goodies" reached number one in 2004.

According to Official Charts, "I Bet" is at 36 on the UK Singles midweek chart dated May 13, 2015; with song's assent, it is expected to become Ciara's first top 40 hit in the UK in six years. "I Bet" was certified Platinum on December 15, 2015. It was also the only song by an African American woman to be certified platinum in 2015.

== Music video ==
In an interview with The Daily Frontrow, Ciara confirmed that she filmed the music video for "I Bet" in New York City on February 13, 2015, stating "I did things I’ve always wanted to do in the video, style-wise and performance-wise. I had a vision!". The video was directed by Hannah Lux Davis, who previously directed the video for 2013 single, "I'm Out" and the video snippets from the album, Ciara (2013). It made its television premiere on Extra on March 9, 2015, followed by an immediate release to Vevo and YouTube.

== Track listing ==
- CD single and digital download
1. "I Bet" – 4:47
2. "I Bet" (R3hab Remix) – 3:28
3. "I Bet" (Remix) (featuring T.I.) – 3:52
- Digital download – Remix
1. "I Bet" (Remix) (featuring T.I.) – 3:52
- Digital download – Remix
1. "I Bet" (Remix) (featuring Joe Jonas) – 4:49
- Digital download – R3hab Remix
1. "I Bet" (R3hab Remix) – 3:28

== Credits and personnel ==
- Ciara – songwriter
- Harmony "H-Money" Samuels – songwriter, producer
- Timothy Thomas – songwriter
- Theron Thomas – songwriter
- Chris "TEK" O'Ryan – engineer, vocal producer
- Carlos King – assistant engineer
- Ryan Kaul – assistant engineer
- Maddox Chimm – assistant engineer
- Jaycen Joshua – mixer
- Dave Kutch – mastering

Credits adapted from Qobuz.

== Charts ==
Chart (2015)	Peak position
Belgium Urban (Ultratop Flanders)	33
Canada Hot 100 (Billboard)	95
Scottish Singles Sales (Official Charts)	30
UK Singles (Official Charts)	56
UK Hip Hop/R&B (Official Charts)	13
US Billboard Hot 100	43
US Hot R&B/Hip-Hop Songs (Billboard)	15
US Rhythmic Airplay (Billboard)	22

== Certifications ==
Region	Certification	Certified units/sales
New Zealand (RMNZ)	Platinum	30,000^{‡}
United Kingdom (BPI)	Silver	200,000^{‡}
United States (RIAA)	Platinum	1,000,000^{‡}
^{‡} Sales+streaming figures based on certification alone.

== Release history ==
Country	Date	Format	Label	Ref.
United States	January 26, 2015	Digital download	Epic	
United States	January 27, 2015	Rhythmic contemporary	Epic	
United States	January 27, 2015	Urban contemporary	Epic	
United States	January 27, 2015	Streaming	Epic	
United Kingdom	April 14, 2015	Digital download – Remix	RCA	
