= Livin' It Up (Ciara song) =

Song by Ciara featuring Nicki Minaj

from the album Ciara
- Recorded: Triangle Sound Studios (Atlanta); Jungle City Studios (New York City)
- Genre: Electropop; Europop
- Length: 3:45
- Label: Epic
- Songwriters: Ciara Harris; Dernst "D'Mile" Emile II; Wynter Gordon; Onika Maraj; Kenneth Carter; Walter Carter; Dave Ferguson; William Hull; Curtis Reynolds; Keith Samuels; Brian Sherrer
- Producer: D'Mile

"Livin' It Up" is a song recorded by American singer-songwriter Ciara for her fifth studio album, Ciara (2013), featuring guest vocals from American female rapper Nicki Minaj. It was written by Ciara, D'Mile, Wynter Gordon and Nicki Minaj, with D'Mile also producing it. "Livin' It Up" contains a portion of the composition "I Don't Know What It Is, But It Sure Is Funky", as performed by Kid 'n Play.

The song leaked in 2012, without Minaj's verses, on a playlist for the Cosmopolitan website, and only in 2013, Minaj was included on the track. The song is also the third time Minaj and Ciara work together, and the second on the same album; with the other being its second single, "I'm Out". "Livin' It Up" is an "Island-flavored", "feel-good track" about enjoying life and living life to the fullest.

"Livin' It Up" received positive reviews from music critics who praised the "feel-good" track for energetic, memorable, affirming that it could be a hit, when released. The song was also a huge success in South Korea, where it has charted at number 2 on the Gaon Charts, selling over 1,000,000 copies in its first week. To promote the album, Ciara recorded "video shorts" for some songs, including one for "Livin' It Up", which lasts for 1:48.

== Background and release ==
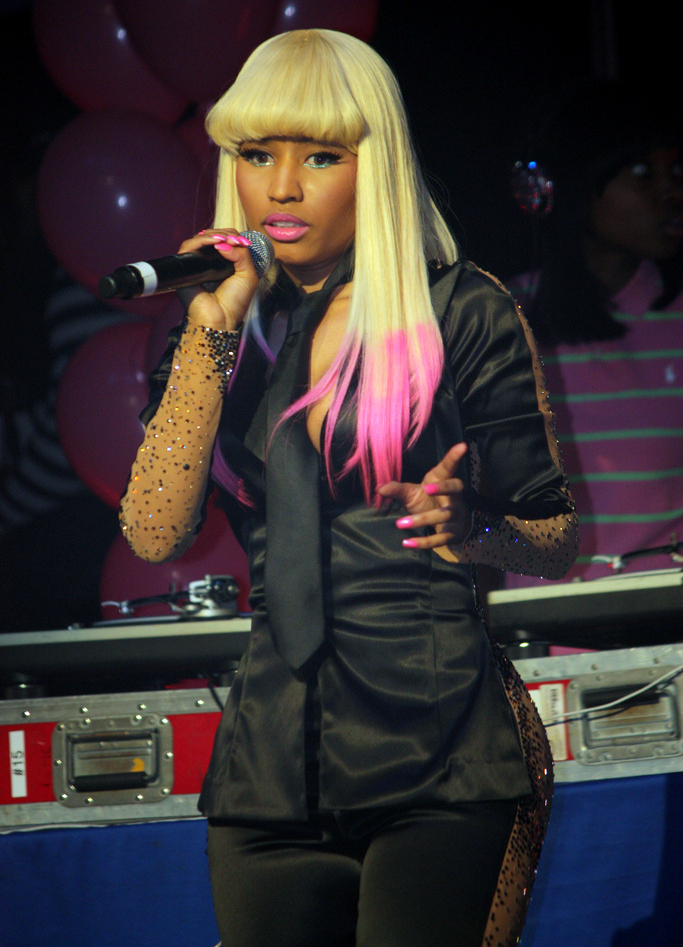
Nicki Minaj (pictured) has worked with Ciara in three songs, two being on Ciara's self-titled album.

"It was actually something I've been wanting to do for a while, and [she] reached out to me to do something and then it just worked out," she said of their collaboration. "Now we're gonna be doing two songs so it's gonna be fun."
—Ciara talking about working with Nicki Minaj.

While Ciara was releasing what was then to be lead-single of her then-titled One Woman Army album, titled "Sorry", "Livin' It Up" surfaced online, appearing on an Epic Records playlist for Cosmopolitan.com, on August 20, 2012. Website Digital Spy reported that the song was expected to receive its radio premiere in the coming weeks, while she had already filmed the accompanying music video. However, the song and the supposed video were never released. In October 2012, in an interview on Jimmy Kimmel Live!, Ciara was asked about working with Minaj on her album, replying "on my album, no".

However, in 2013, a new version of the song was made, including guest vocals from American female rapper Nicki Minaj, who had already worked with Ciara on another track from Ciara's eponymously titled album, "I'm Out". Ciara previously recorded the track "I'm Legit", for Minaj's second studio album, Pink Friday: Roman Reloaded – The Re-Up (2012). In an interview for Paper, Ciara talked about the collaboration, saying, "She invited me to be on her album, and I invited her to be on mine. I didn’t feel like there was any other person I wanted for that song. She came in and murdered the verse!".

== Composition and lyrics ==
"Livin' It Up" was written by Ciara, Wynter Gordon, Nicki Minaj, while Dernst "D'Mile" Emile II co-wrote and produced it. "Livin' It Up" contains a portion of the composition "I Don't Know What It Is, But It Sure Is Funky", written by K. Carter, W. Carter, D. Ferguson, W. Hull, C. Reynolds, K. Samuels and B. Sherrer, as performed by Kid 'n Play. Lyrically, for Mesfin Fekadu of Yahoo! Music, the song "has an empowering feel," talking about living life to the fullest, with Minaj's verses affirmes her partner's greatness.

"I have my doubts in love, but I know it’s true/ I don’t have many friends, but I’ve got you," sings Ciara, chanting "Ola ola ey!" on the catchy chorus. "Cause a girl's got to do what a girl's got to do/ Making up her own rules" Ciara sings. Musically, "Livin' It Up" is a mid-tempo, "Island-flavored", Euro and electropop "feel-good" track, with Pip Elwood pointing out that, "it has an 80s vibe that is ridiculously infectious." In this song Ciara displays a vocal range spanning from the harmonized low note of C#3 to the high belt of Eb5.

== Critical reception ==
"Livin' It Up" received generally favorable reviews from most music critics. Andy Kellman of Allmusic named it "one of the album's highlights", calling it "functional and memorable". In a review for the album, Tim Finney of Pitchfork considered "Overdose" and "Livin' It Up" "highlights", "because their obviousness transformed into a virtue through the singer’s palpable enjoyment." Erika Ramirez of Billboard wrote that "Livin' It Up", "is not only a boost of energy, but you guessed it, confidence," praising Minaj for giving "a well-deserved pat on the back." Jon Caramanica of New York Times called the song and wrote that it "could pass for an old Erasure song." Nick Henderson of Tiny Mix Tapes called it "a kinda-contrived mid-tempo number whose self-affirming mantra rehashes Minaj’s own 'Starships'." Robert Copsey of Digital Spy wrote the song "has huge hit potential and is about as radio friendly as Ciara gets." Website This Is R&B wrote that Ciara "looks to appeal to the young Top 40 market with this feel-good catchy track."

Lauren Martin of Fact praised the track, writing that "Nicki’s second welcome outing on the joyous ‘Livin’ It Up’ – in which grinning from ear to ear to is a prerequisite – is as much an affirmation of the dominance of female pop stars in 2013 overall as an ode to Cici's decade in the game. Female artists are currently at the forefront of R&B like never before and it gives ‘Livin’ It Up’ its backbone; Nicki and Cici are holding hands and throwing smug smiles around for all to see, and these two tracks are particular highlights because of it." For Sam Lansky of Idolator, "Livin' It Up" "sounds more robust in the context of the album." Bradley Stern of MuuMuse called it a "fresh, Island-infused anthem shimmers with a summery vibe, embracing the #YOLO-pop phenomenon without ever coming off as trite." Rob Harvilla also of Spin was not favorable, calling the song "a vapid romantic-comedy shopping montage."

On November 21, 2017, Billboard magazine ranked "Livin' it Up" at #57 on its list of 100 Best Deep Cuts by 21st Century Pop Stars, writing "With feel-good lyrics like "Ima live life to the fullest/ I'll be speeding like a bullet/ I'll be rolling like a train / I'll be dancing in the rain," the only conclusion as to why it wasn't pulled as a single was that Minaj was already featured on the album's second hit, "I'm Out"—arguably the weaker of the two tracks."

== Music video ==
In order to further promote her "self-titled album", Ciara shot a number of "video shorts" to bring songs from the album to life. According to herself, "I did video snippets of many of the songs on the album for my fans so they can have the best experience of my music possible. I wanted my fans to see the music for the first time while they are also hearing it." "Livin' It Up" was one of the songs to have a "video short", which lasts for 1 minute and 48 seconds, premiering on July 9, 2013, alongside "Read My Lips video. The video short for "Read My Lips" was directed by Hannah Lux Davis. The "short video" sees the singer performing the track in a corridor lit up in blue and pink, while she also mimes Nicki Minaj's guest verse.

Sam Lanksy of Idolator commented on the video, writing that, "While the song may be great, the video isn’t the most compelling from the little clips CiCi’s shot over the course of this album era — it’s oversaturated in pink and purple and is mostly just one long shot of Ciara dancing in a hallway. But! I do quite like that she lip-syncs to Nicki Minaj's verse rather than cutting around it. Sort of a nifty touch.

== Charts ==
"Livin' It Up" was a huge success on South Korea's Gaon Download Chart, debuting at number 2, selling 1,142,651, only in its first week. In the second week, the song remained at number 2, selling 736,290 copies, In the third week, the song only fell to number 4, selling 538,973 copies, bringing a total of 2,417,914 copies. As of August 24, 2013, the song was already with 3,159,366 copies sold.

Aside of the "International Digital Chart", "Livin' It Up" also debuted on the main digital chart, charting with all the Korean singles at number 129.

Chart (2013)	Peak position
South Korea (Gaon Digital Chart)	129
South Korea (Gaon International Digital Chart)	2
