= Read My Lips (Ciara song) =

Song by Ciara

from the album Ciara
- Released: July 23, 2013
- Recorded: 2012–2013: Triangle Sound Studios (Atlanta); Jungle City Studios (New York City)
- Genre: Electropop
- Length: 4:08
- Label: Epic
- Songwriters: Ciara Harris; Rodney Jerkins; Olivia Waithe
- Producer: Darkchild

"Read My Lips" is a song recorded by American singer-songwriter Ciara for her fifth studio album, Ciara (2013). It was written by Ciara, Livvi Franc, and co-written and produced by Rodney "Darkchild" Jerkins. The song was set to be released as the third single from the album, but was cancelled. To promote the album, Ciara recorded "video shorts" for some songs, including one for "Read My Lips", which lasts for 1:30.

Musically, "Read My Lips" is an electropop song, with sunshine-y chords and bouncy, half-organic drums. Lyrically, the song features a lot of innuendos about cunnilingus, where Ciara uses a sweet vocal to talk about it. "Read My Lips" received favorable reviews from music critics who praised the song for being both ridiculously lubricious and kind of sweet. The song has charted at number 5 on the South Korea charts, selling over 890,000 copies.

== Background and release ==
In March 2013, "Body Party" was released as "Ciara"'s lead single. After "Body Party" success, the song "I'm Out" was released to radio stations, becoming a moderate success. In August 2013, Ciara announced in an interview with "Hollywood Life" that "Where You Go", featuring her boyfriend Future, will serve as the third official single from the album in the United States, while "Overdose" will serve as the next international single. However, in September 2013, Ciara confirmed in an interview and on her Twitter that "Read My Lips" was set to be the album's new single, but in the same month, the cover of "Overdose" was released and it was announced that the song would set to hit radio on October 14, 2013. As of November, "Read My Lips" has not been released as a single however, the song is available on iTunes.

== Composition and lyrics ==
"Creatively, we just have a strong creative connection that it was only right [to work with him on the album]. I think it makes the experience so much more fun. We’re all about the challenge."
—Ciara talking about working with "Darkchild".

"Read My Lips" was written by Ciara, Livvi Franc, while Rodney "Darkchild" Jerkins co-wrote and produced it. "Darkchild" is responsible for producing several of Ciara's past songs, including the 2007 single "Can't Leave 'Em Alone" and "Make It Last Forever," both from Ciara: The Evolution (2006), as well as the 2012 single "Got Me Good." Speaking about collaborating with Jerkins, Ciara said, "I like Rodney for so many reasons," Ciara explains. "He’s a friend of mine but musically, he’s one of the few music geniuses left that have had the history of the old school seasoning and the modernized way. He has it all in one. That’s what makes him very special."

Lyrically, "Read My Lips" is a double entendre-filled cunnilingus ode, with the singer singing, "So we're staying in tonight, everybody is going out, can we sit this one out, baby? I got something else in mind, close the blinds, dim the lights and you better bring your appetite." The singer also intones, "you’re the only one I wanna give it to." Musically, "Read My Lips" is a mid-tempo "perky" electropop, "80s-inflected" synth song, featuring "sunshine-y" chords and "bouncy", half-organic drums, with Jon Caramanica of The New York Times calling it "girl-group future-soul."

== Critical reception ==
"Read My Lips" received generally favorable reviews from most music critics, for being racy and sweet at the same time. For Sam Lansky of Idolator, "Read My Lips" "is sugary sweet, a singalong number that should be an instant fan favorite." Erika Ramirez of Billboard wrote that "A 2013 R&B album, from a female R&B singer, wouldn't be complete without an ode to the oral-obsessed," writing that "the singer kicks off a domino affect of innuendos that prove tasty and tart." Tim Finney of Pitchfork analyzed that the song is "delivered with such frothy, wide-eyed innocence that it’s hard even to notice the subject matter." In another review for Idolator, Sam Lansky agreed with Finney, writing that the song is "bouncy, wobbly and sweet even as it’s hilariously explicit." For Hermione Hoby of The Observer wrote the song "manages to be both ridiculously lubricious and kind of sweet with its promise of a 'home-cooked meal'." Pip Elwood of Entertainment Focus called it one of the album's best moments, writing that it's "beat-heavy and catchy, where Ciara uses her sweeter vocal tone whilst still conveying plenty of attitude.

Nick Henderson of Tiny Mix Tapes wrote that "Read My Lips", "finds Cici in full-on bubblegum mode, doing "Disney Teenstar Young-Girl" better than some people who actually fit that description, telling the listener to 'savor it, savor it' in an adolescent whine totally void of the emotional drive and minor-key iciness that typifies a Ciara vocal, a naive devotional that's positively and uncannily Taylor Swift." Lauren Martin of Fact wrote that the song "sounds strictly PG, with the sugary sweet beat bounces down a Demi Lovato route with the insipid 'I’ll make you something real nice', instead of honing in on the sweatbox sultriness." Robert Copsey of Digital Spy called it "an eye-poppingly explicit number that, despite its earworm hooks and killer chorus, is unlikely to soar up the charts in the current climate." Rob Harvilla also of Spin was not favorable, writing that the song "would've benefited greatly from even 90 seconds of R. Kelly's undivided attention and sounds like something Miley Cyrus would put out if she was consciously trying to break the Internet," recommending "Read My Lips", "primarily to 12-year-olds."

== Music video ==
“I did video snippets of many of the songs on the album for my fans so they can have the best experience of my music possible,” I wanted my fans to see the music for the first time while they are also hearing it.”

— Ciara speaking on the concept for releasing multiple videos.

In order to further promote her "self-titled album", Ciara shot a number of "video shorts" to bring songs from the album to life. According to herself, "I did video snippets of many of the songs on the album for my fans so they can have the best experience of my music possible. I wanted my fans to see the music for the first time while they are also hearing it." "Read My Lips" was one of the songs to have a "video short" of 1 minute and 30 seconds, premiering on July 9, 2013. Following the release of snippets of the album's songs “DUI” and "Sophomore" Ciara released the third of five video snippets on July 9, 2013. The video preview premiered exclusively at Glamour magazine. The video short for "Read My Lips" was directed by Hannah Lux Davis. In it, she sports high-street fashion, according to "Glamour Magazine"'s Mickey Woods.

== Live performances ==
Ciara performed the track on 106 & Park, on July 9, 2013, in order to promote the album. Ciara also visited The Recording Academy's headquarters in Santa Monica, California, to participate in an exclusive Grammy.com interview. Following the interview, Ciara performed a brief acoustic set featuring tracks from her self-titled album, including "Overdose", "DUI" and "Read My Lips."

== Charts ==
"Read My Lips" has charted on the South Korea's Gaon Download Chart, debuting at number 5, with sales of 639,962. In the second week, the song fell to number 36, selling 177,586 copies, bringing a total of 895, 834 copies.

Chart (2013)	Peak position
South Korea (Gaon International Digital Chart)	5
