= Sweat (Ciara song) =

Song performed by 2 Chainz, Ciara

Promotional single by Ciara featuring 2 Chainz
- Released: June 18, 2012
- Genre: R&B
- Length: 3:50
- Label: Epic
- Songwriters: Ciara Harris; Tauheed Epps; William Wesson; Patrizio Pigliapoco; Christopher Trujillo; Kenneth Townsend; Stanley Randolph
- Producers: Stanley Randolph; Kenneth Townsend

"Sweat" is a song recorded by American recording artist Ciara for her self-titled fifth album Ciara (2013), originally titled One Woman Army. Featuring guest vocals from rapper 2 Chainz, "Sweat" is Ciara's debut release under Epic Records after publicly asking to leave previous label Jive Records. The label failed to support Ciara creatively and financially on previous albums, Fantasy Ride (2009) and Basic Instinct (2010), contributing to poor performance of both albums. Ciara's contract with Epic Records reunited the singer with her mentor L.A. Reid, who is credited as originally signing the singer to his LaFace Records label during the beginning of her career in 2004, as well as having a hand in producing her debut album, Goodies (2004).

Initially touted as the lead single from Ciara, "Sweat" received mixed reviews from music critics, with some describing the song as a heavy club song, while others referred to the song as boring. "Sweat" was likened to previous urban singles "Goodies" (2004) and "Like a Boy" (2006). It was serviced to rhythmic radio stations on June 18, 2012; however, its planned digital release for June 19, 2012 was cancelled. Epic Records subsequently noted the song as a promotional single when it charted at number eighty-six on the US Billboard Hot R&B/Hip-Hop Songs chart. The song was replaced by a ballad called "Sorry" as the lead single from Ciara but what when that underperformed too, both songs were scrapped from the album and replaced with an R&B midtempo song called "Body Party", subsequently touted as the album's new lead single.

== Background and release ==
Ciara's previous two albums, Fantasy Ride (2009) and Basic Instinct (2010), both underperformed commercially compared to the singer's first two albums; Ciara: The Evolution (2006) debuted at number one, while her debut album, Goodies (2004), debuted at number three. Following a heavy period of legal issues and unauthorized leaking of songs from the Fantasy Ride recording sessions, Ciara recorded Basic Instinct in strict confidentiality. Ciara reflected on the album's progress at the time, stating that she wasn't interested in first week sales or performance. However, Gerrick Kennedy from the Los Angeles Times attributed Basic Instinct's lack of success to multiple pushbacks and the leaking of material from the album's recording sessions. Eventually, Ciara broke her silence revealing that Jive Records had not financially supported her with Fantasy Ride and Basic Instinct. Ciara was left to pay for promotion herself, which included funding the music video and radio release of her last single "Gimmie Dat". She publicly asked to be released from Jive on February 14, 2011.

On July 12, 2011, it was reported that she had reunited with L.A. Reid by signing with his record label Epic Records. Reid had previously signed Ciara to LaFace Records at the start of her career and was a factor in the commercial success of her debut album, Goodies (2004). Billboard magazine went on to confirm her move to Epic in September 2011. On May 30, 2012 during promotional appearances for That's My Boy, a film Ciara stars in, the singer announced she had a new single on the way called "Sweat". Just five days later on June 4, 2012, "Sweat" premiered online, the bass-heavy record features upcoming rapper 2 Chainz and was unveiled as the lead single from Ciara's fifth album Ciara (2013). The record was serviced to rhythmic radio stations on June 18, 2012 and was scheduled for release as a digital download on June 19, 2012. However, the digital release did not happen as planned, and when charting Billboard listed the song as a promotional single. On August 13, 2012, Ciara revealed through a handwritten letter that a song called "Sorry" would be released as the album's lead single.

== Composition and reception ==
"Sweat" is an uptempo "bass-heavy" club song which features rapper 2 Chainz. Serving as Ciara's debut release with Epic Records, "Sweat" was described by MTV News as a throwback to "Ciara's old roots," particularly drawing comparisons to "Like a Boy." It was written by Ciara, 2 Chainz, William Wesson, Patrizio Pigliapoco, Christopher Trujillo, K. Townsend, and S. Randolph. The song was described as "bass-heavy banger" by Rap-Up. Becky Bain from Idolator, however, was disappointed with "Sweat," describing the song as "not very exciting." In her review, Bain said, "Ciara's vocals go nowhere, the beat doesn't pick up or drop off or twist or turn unexpectedly, and the repetitive lyrics are your generic sexy-dancefloor bon mots."

== Chart performance ==
"Sweat" peaked at number 86 on the Hot R&B/Hip-Hop Songs chart in Billboard magazine.

Chart (2012)	Peak position
US Hot R&B/Hip-Hop Songs (Billboard)	86

== Release history ==
Region	Date	Format	Label
Worldwide	June 4, 2012	Premiere	Epic Records
United States	June 18, 2012	Rhythmic airplay	Epic Records
