= Ciara (album) =

Studio album by Ciara
- Released: July 5, 2013
- Recorded: 2011–2013
- Studios: Los Angeles (2nd Floor Studios, Glendwood Palace, Larrabee Sound, Mason Sound, Paramount Studios); Miami (Circle House Studios); Atlanta (The Love Zone, Triangle Sound)
- Genres: Pop; crunk&B; R&B; electronic
- Length: 43:20
- Label: Epic
- Producers: Ciara; Mike Will Made It; Josh Abraham; Fuego; Cam Wallace; King X; D'Mile; Rodney "Darkchild" Jerkins; The Co-Captains; The Rockstars; Soundz; The Underdogs

Ciara chronology
Playlist: the Very Best of Ciara (2012)	Ciara (2013)	Jackie (2015)

Singles from Ciara
- 1. "Body Party" Released: March 8, 2013; 2. "I'm Out" Released: June 3, 2013; 3. "Overdose" Released: September 18, 2013

Ciara is the fifth studio album by American singer Ciara, which was released on July 5, 2013. This album is the artist's first release under Epic Records, since publicly asking the once-defunct Jive Records to release her from her contractual obligations. The singer cited a lack of label support and financial funding for her previous albums Fantasy Ride (2009) and Basic Instinct (2010). On this fifth studio album, Ciara is reunited with her long-term mentor and friend L.A. Reid, chairman of Epic Records. Reid is credited with discovering Ciara in 2003 along with signing her to his LaFace Records label and executive-producing her debut studio album, Goodies (2004).

On Ciara, the singer is reunited with music producers Rodney Jerkins and Jasper Cameron, who have respectively worked on previous Ciara singles and albums. The duo were joined by The Underdogs, Soundz, D'Mile, Oligee, Josh Abraham and Mike Will Made It, amongst others. Writing contributions come from the likes of singer-songwriters: Wynter Gordon, Livvi Franc and Ali Tamposi, along with a number of contributions from Ciara herself. Rappers Future and Nicki Minaj respectively have guest vocals on the album, whilst Ciara herself is listed as a featured artist on the song "Super Turnt Up", a record where she raps and takes credit for co-producing the song.

Promoting the release of this album, all three singles; including "Sweat" featuring 2 Chainz, "Sorry", and "Got Me Good" were released, when the album was titled One Woman Army. None of the songs impacted on the US Billboard Hot 100 and were subsequently swept aside in favor of a new single, titled "Body Party", which reached at number 22 on the US Billboard Hot 100 and number one on the US Billboard Hot R&B/Hip-Hop Songs chart. "I'm Out" featuring Nicki Minaj, was released as the album's second single in June 2013. "Overdose" was released as the album's third single, it was serviced to American Urban and Rhythmic radio in September and October 2013, respectively.

Upon its release, Ciara was met with a warm reception from music critics, who complimented the album as one of the strongest in her discography. The album debuted at number two on the US Billboard 200 chart, with first-week sales of 59,000 copies, becoming her fourth top three album on the chart. As of April 2015, the album has sold 208,000 copies in the United States.

== Background ==
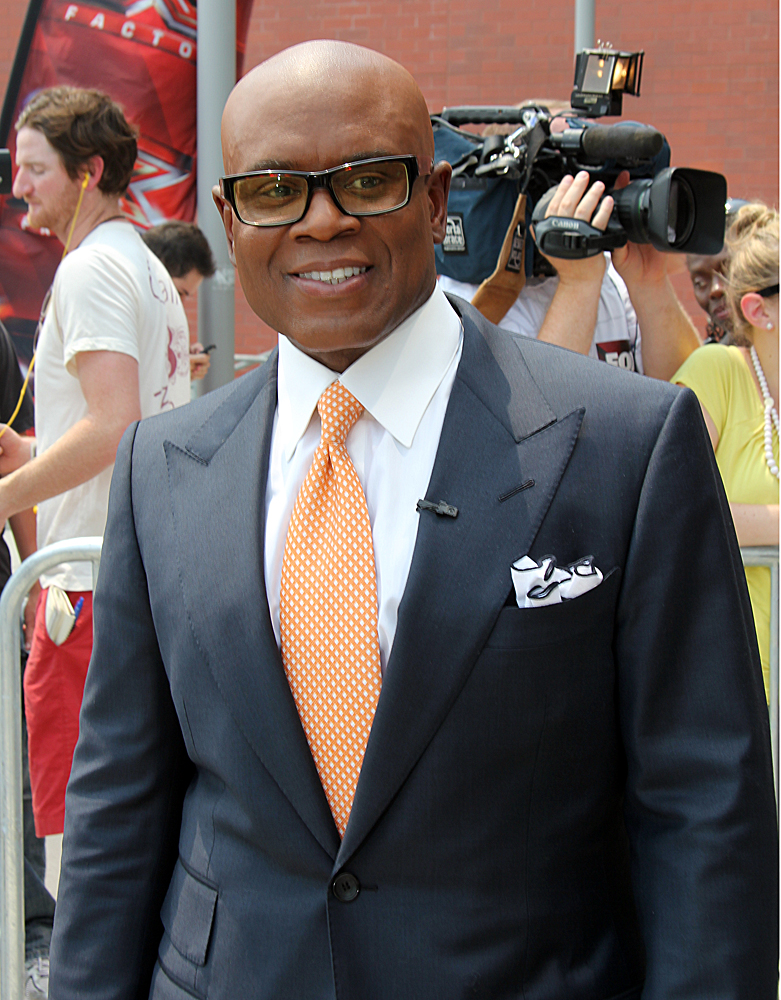
Following her departure from Jive Records, Ciara signed a new record deal with the president of Epic Records, L.A. Reid.

Under LaFace Records (and later Jive Records), Ciara released her 3× platinum-certified debut album Goodies (2004) and its follow-up, the platinum-certified Ciara: The Evolution (2006). Album three, Fantasy Ride (2009), was plagued with issues which resulted in Ciara changing management part way through the album's production and dropping the idea of a 3-disc concept album. Additionally many of the records leaked online prior to the album's release; as a result, Basic Instinct (2010) was recorded in strict confidentiality. Basic Instinct sold just 37,000 copies in its first week in the United States, and became Ciara's first album to miss the top-three on the Billboard 200. At the time, Ciara said that she wasn't interested in first week sales or the album's commercial performance, but rather in building her brand as an artist. According to the Los Angeles Times' Gerrick Kennedy, the lack of commercial success with Basic Instinct was attributable to multiple pushbacks, and the leaking of material from the album's recording sessions. In February 2011, Ciara revealed that her relationship with her record label was not on positive terms; Jive had not properly financial supported Fantasy Ride or Basic Instinct. Ciara self-funded some of the albums promotions, including her last single "Gimmie Dat" and in the end wrote a public letter asking to be released from her record obligations.

"It's just really about the vibe, and I'll just tell you that it's a good vibe going. It's really important for me to take my time with this record and it's important for the whole team. It's really, really good energy."

— Ciara, talking about taking her time with album number five.

Several months later in July of the same year, it was revealed that Ciara would be reuniting with L.A. Reid by signing to his Epic Records label. Reid had previously signed Ciara to LaFace at the start of her career, and played a role in executively producing her debut album Goodies (2004). Billboard magazine officially confirmed Ciara's signing to Epic in September 2011. During an interview with Sway in the Morning in February 2012, Ciara revealed that she would be taking her time recording her fifth studio album. In June 2012, Ciara spoke about the album saying "It really is just me pouring my heart into the record, and I think my fans deserve that. I really had to be in a comfortable place, and I really am and I'm excited about it, that's the beauty of music. Music is like really being able to express yourself. I wanted to make sure that I expressed myself in the best way that I could, and I let the music also be a healing process for me at points. There's a lot of happy moments as well, so that's what it's about. That's music. You laugh, you cry, you dance, you love, you hurt, you feel all kinds of things. That's the beauty of music."

== Writing, production and collaborations ==
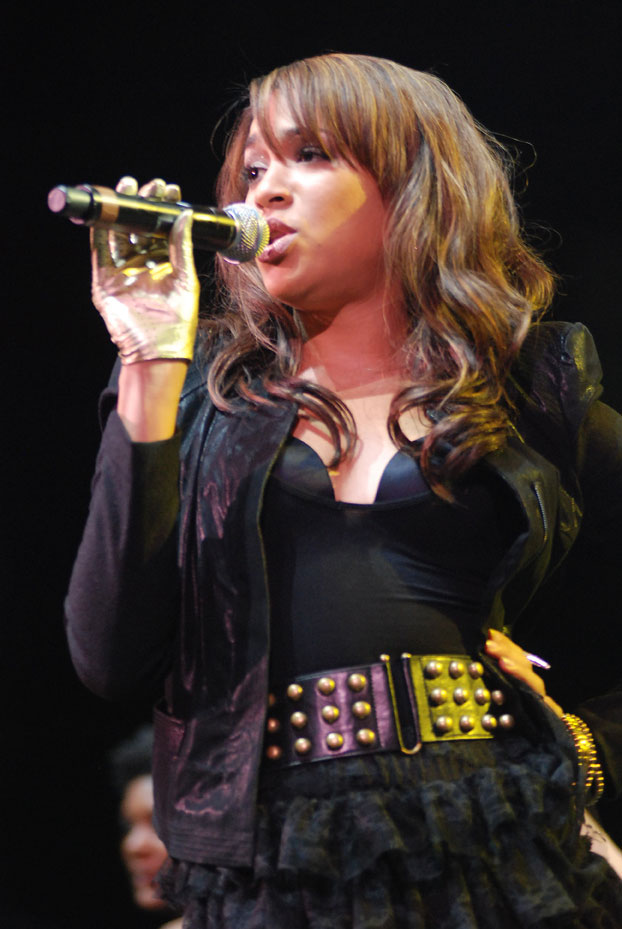
Livvi Franc was originally contracted to co-write the album. She co-wrote "Read My Lips" and "Overdose" which appear on the album. "One Woman Army" originally written for this album by Franc was included on Ciara's next album Jackie (2015).

On her fifth album, Ciara contributed to both the writing and production of the album's songs. She wrote "Sweat" (featuring 2 Chainz), a song that was originally supposed to be the album's first single when the album was called One Woman Army. Ciara also co-wrote and co-produced "Sorry", the song that was chosen to supersede "Sweat" as one of One Woman Army's two lead singles, along with "Got Me Good", also written by Ciara. None of these records made the final album. "Sorry" was co-written and co-produced by Jasper Cameron, who previously worked with Ciara on her 2006 single "Promise" and 2009 single "Never Ever". Together the duo wrote and produced "Super Turnt Up" which did make the final listing for Ciara. "Got Me Good" was co-written with Rodney Jerkins and Livvi Franc (Olivia Waith). When interviewed by Rap-Up TV, Jerkins said "I had a meeting with her about what her future holds and I told her I was there if she ever needed my creative juices, so hopefully me and her get in the studio and work." Jerkins previously produced records for Ciara: The Evolution and Fantasy Ride.

Waithe meanwhile, was originally enlisted to write the majority of the album's songs along with songwriter and vocal coach Ali Tamposi; in an interview about the project, Tamposi said "it's been really cool and laid back so that's been fun. There's a lot of angst and edge in Ciara's music and we've tried to be really conceptual and write things that haven't been done before and real strong women empowerment songs." Along with The Underdogs (Harvey Mason and Damon Thomas), the duo wrote the album's original title track "One Woman Army". They also contributed at least one other song, "Washaway", though neither song appears on the final album following the change of album titles. "Washaway" and another song called "Running" were amongst several songs previewed by the media which didn't make the album. It was the first time in her career that Ciara had collaborated with The Underdogs. Not all of the Waithe and Tamposi collaborations went to waste, "Read My Lips" (written by Harris, Waithe and Jerkins) and "Overdose" (written by Waithe, Tamposi, Oliver Goldstein and Josh Abraham) both made the album.

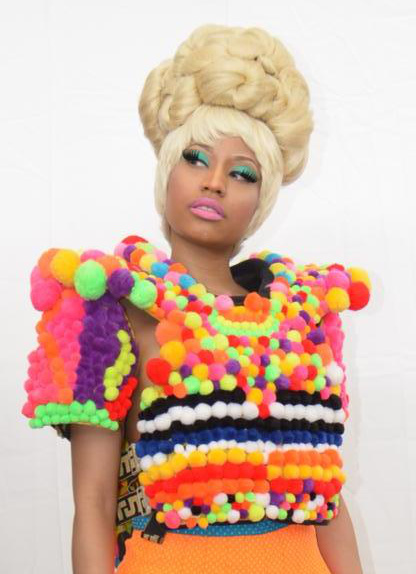
Minaj features on "I'm Out" and "Living it Up"; Ciara previously featured on Minaj's song "I'm Legit" from Pink Friday: Roman Reloaded – The Re-Up.

Ciara also worked with Bangladesh, Hit-Boy, Soundz and Jermaine Dupri. Hit-Boy produced a record written by Soundz named after himself, which he described as "energetic, for the club, for the radio." However, while Ciara recorded the full song, months went by after its production with no response. Thus, he gave the beat to Kendrick Lamar, and it became his single, "Backseat Freestyle" (2013). Whilst that record did not appear on the album, "Sophomore" produced by Soundz and "DUI" co-produced by Soundz and The Rockstarz both made the album. Soundz previously produced records for Basic Instinct. Another of Ciara's frequent collaborators, Tricky Stewart, also worked on the album. On July 22, 2012, it was revealed that singer-songwriter Wynter Gordon had written a song for Ciara. Speaking about the song, Gordon said, "It's pop. She sounds really good. She's singing like I've never actually heard Ciara sound... I'm very proud of her vocal ability on this record." The song titled "Livin' It Up" was produced by Jerkins' close friend and musical associate D'Mile.

After collaborating with American rapper Nicki Minaj on the song "I'm Legit" for Minaj's album Pink Friday: Roman Reloaded - The Re-Up, Minaj agreed to appear on Ciara's album in return. Originally, the duo had worked on just one collaboration for Ciara called "I'm Out". Speaking about Minaj's version on the song, Ciara said "The energy of the record is so dope, and it's really for the ladies, and Nicki she just killed the verse. She literally murdered it, like she got that throw-back, that thing that she does that's so special. She went in." Having enjoyed the process Minaj said "I was supposed to only do one song for her album and I think I'm going to end up doing two. I just love what she's doing and I'm so proud and I'm really excited for people to hear it." In April, Ciara confirmed that Minaj was finished with a second record for the album; in an interview with MTV News, Ciara said, "She's actually finishing up one now that's really it's a monster too. The moments that we have had so far have just been crazy. It's just been magical, it's been something special and I feel like the fans have always wanted to see she and I rock together." In the end, Minaj also recorded vocals for the aforementioned "Livin' It Up". On June 23, 2013, rapper, Future confirmed that the track, "Where You Go", was originally recorded for his second studio album, Future Hendrix (2013); however, he gave it to Ciara, stating, "She's like, 'I need this song. It just seems like it was just speaking to me. Give it to me, give it to me.' I was like, 'Man cool, you can have it."

== Concept ==
"As we were moving along, I started to take a different creative turn. I found some new inspiration along the way, so the One Woman Army movement still exists and it's still a part of who I am because it represents my strength and my struggles and my journey. However, the best way for me to title the record at the time period or at this moment was simply Ciara."

— Ciara, speaking on changing the title.

Ciara's fifth album was originally called One Woman Army after a song of the same name produced by The Underdogs. Speaking on the concept Ciara said "It really is the best way to represent what the body of work is, On One Woman Army, I talk about where I am and the things that I want as a woman and the things that I need." However, on April 15, 2013, Ciara confirmed the album's track listing and simultaneously revealed that her fifth album was now eponymously titled. According to Spin, the self-titled incarnation of Ciara's fifth studio album is "more inventive enough to separate itself from her previous work" compared to the album's previous direction, under the title One Woman Army.

During a press release, Epic Records described the album as a deeply personal record; speaking about the concept and themes on the album, Ciara said "I can sometimes be afraid of my own vulnerability, but this time I let myself face it. I let myself feel. I let myself be real. I let myself hurt and be healed." Spin and Idolator described the album as an updated version of crunk&B, a sound that Ciara was familiar with in 2004, and contained my pop moments. Ciara explained the influence behind the album's theme saying,

"the way this one was different is, I think, it was really more so the freedom that I felt with being vulnerable and my confidence. Me starting with just wanting to completely be free and be me in my song and not care about what anybody has to say. It's not about being over-independent, but it does represent my independence as a woman and it represents my strength. It represents where I stand with love. It represents what I want out of life as a woman. It's all of that in one and more."

== Release and artwork ==
On June 4, 2012, Ciara began the album campaign for One Woman Army with the premiere of "Sweat", featuring American rapper 2 Chainz. It was released to rhythmic contemporary radio stations in the United States on June 18, 2012. It was initially intended to serve as the album's lead single; Upon charting at eighty-six on the US Hot R&B/Hip-Hop Songs chart, it was demoted to promotional single status. On September 11, 2012, Epic Records informed fans via Twitter that they could expect Ciara's fifth album in Winter 2012. A new lead single, "Sorry", was confirmed and released on September 25, 2012. It impacted on rhythmic radio stations on October 9, 2012. The song's music video premiered on September 13, 2012. The single was well received by music critics, who compared it to Ciara's previous single, "Promise". "Sorry" underperformed commercially, as it only reached forty-two on the US Billboard Hot R&B/Hip-Hop Songs chart while charting at twenty-two on the Billboard Bubbling Under Hot 100 Singles chart. "Got Me Good" was released as the second single via digital download on November 6, 2012. The single impacted US Rhythmic radio on November 13, 2012 and mainstream radio on December 4, 2012. The song's accompanying music video, which was directed by Joseph Kahn, premiered on the Sony JumboTron in Times Square in New York City on October 25, 2012. The video features the all-girl dance crew 8 Flavahz, who placed 2nd on the seventh season of MTV's America's Best Dance Crew. Although the song was well received by critics, who praised its electronic fast-paced rhythms and called it "dance food-ready", it failed to chart.

That same month, Ciara said that there was no release date for the album. She instead said "I think I'm almost done. I think there was a date December 4 that was supposedly put in the universe, but the date was never ever confirmed, not from my mouth, but they can definitely look out for this album this winter. I'll be telling you soon. Stay tuned. You know what? I'm giving you guys my video [for "Got Me Good"] on my birthday, so you never know what could happen around Christmas-time. I love giving gifts." After the premiere of the "Got Me Good" video, the album was slated to drop in early 2013. On April 15, 2013, Ciara revealed the official tracklist for the album and confirmed that it is now titled Ciara. Additionally, she stated that it would be released on June 4, 2013. The album was then postponed to July 9, 2013. The aforementioned singles were swept aside from the album and subsequently under the title Ciara, the album is now led by the single "Body Party". The album artwork features a mirror-flipped image of Ciara.

== Music and lyrics ==
Following the album listening party, Spin described the album as having no ballads except "Body Party" whilst John Kennedy, writing for Vibe, described the album as "feel-good midtempo" songs akin to Ciara's Goodies era (circa 2004). In an interview with MTV News Ciara said that creating her fifth album was the most personal experience of her career thus far. She elaborated that she had asked close friend and collaborator Missy Elliott to review her early progress on Ciara, "I always share my projects with her early. I'll go to her house and play her the records really early in the process, and it's always so cool, but I just have to pinch myself in moments when I see her a lot. I'll be like, 'OK, this is really my friend,' but it's dope because I really respect her. She's done something in music that no one has done and when you look at her old references and just her references period, you wonder what the mind of that person is, and she's my friend, so I get to get a little bit more out of that mind, and it's really cool."

The album opens with "I'm Out", a "crystalline" rhythmic pop ladies' anthem, which features Trinidadian-American rapper Nicki Minaj. Its melody is backed by "clattering percussion". It was written by Timothy and Theron Thomas (Planet VI), who also wrote track number four, "Keep On Looking". Other pop songs on the album include the Wynter Gordon-penned "Livin' It Up", which was described by Billboard as a "feel-good track" that "infuses island flavors." It samples elements of the bridge from rap duo Kid 'n Play's 1988 song "Rolling with Kid 'n Play". According to Idolator, it also contains Euro influences. "Overdose" is also a pop song, though this time utilising an electropop production and electronic dance music (EDM) beat, that was described by Idolator as the "most straightforward pop track that Ciara has ever cut". The Rodney Jerkins-produced "Read My Lips" features a 1980s-inspired synthpop production with a sing-along chorus, whilst "Sophomore" is "sexy-but-aggressive [and] grown-as-fuck." On "Sophomore", Ciara educates her partner on "sex education", with lyrics such as "So soft, my skin/ So soft, my booty/ So soft, my bed/ So soft, I got 'em sayin'/ Give me more". The song was originally leaked by DJ Orator in September 2012. It was produced by Soundz, who also co-produced "DUI" with The Rockstars. The album's lead single "Body Party" is the album's only ballad, it was co-written by Ciara's boyfriend Future and features a sample of Ghost Town DJ's 1996 single "My Boo".

== Promotion ==
Promotion for Ciara's fifth album (then titled One Woman Army) began on June 2, 2012 when Ciara released several promotional pictures. Several days later, Ciara previewed songs at an album listening party for industry executives and a variety of internet bloggers in New York City. Amongst the songs played were collaborations with Rick Ross and Nicki Minaj. Ciara would later confirm that it was not Minaj's, but her own vocals, that reviewers has heard at the listening party [on "Super Turnt Up"]. Many positive reviews came from the listening party. Patrik Sandberg of V Magazine said it was the "Hardest @ciara record I've heard. She's reconstructing the lanes. So future." "This album is ridiculous. It's coming for everything!" The Ross collaboration made the album as a bonus track exclusively at Target.com and for the Japanese release. On August 20, 2012, Epic Records sent an exclusive playlist of songs to Cosmopolitan magazine which contained the album's ninth track, "Livin' It Up", sans Minaj's vocals.

Promotion in 2013 began with Ciara's appearances on BET's 106 & Park on April 23, 2013 and on The Wendy Williams Show on May 8, 2013. She performed on Jimmy Kimmel Live! on June 4, 2013; the performance aired on television on July 2, 2013. Ciara went on to premiere the album's eighth track, "Super Turnt Up", on California radio station, Power 106, on June 7, 2013. She headlined the Los Angeles Gay Pride festival on June 9, 2013, performing several songs, including past hits "Goodies" (2004) and "Ride" (2010), and lead single, "Body Party". Ciara performed "Body Party" and "I'm Out" with Nicki Minaj at the 2013 BET Awards on June 30, 2013.

On July 2, 2013, it was announced that Ciara will release video snippets for five of the album's tracks in promotion for its release. Each was directed by Hannah Lux Davis. The first snippet was for the album's eighth track, "DUI", which premiered on CBS' omg! Insider the same day. The second snippet was for the album's second track, "Sophomore", which premiered on E! News later that day. Ciara premiered snippets for the album's fifth track, "Read My Lips", and ninth track, "Livin' It Up", on July 9, 2013. On July 11, 2013, the fifth and final video "Keep On Lookin'" was released. Ciara appeared on 106 & Park from July 8 to 12, where she premiered new songs each day. She performed "DUI" and "Body Party (Remix)" with B.o.B on July 8, Further promotion continued. Ciara performed many shows across the US. She made an appearance at the Grammy Recording Academy and performed acoustic versions of the songs "Read My Lips", "DUI", and "Overdose".

== Singles ==
"Body Party" was released via digital download on March 8, 2013, as the lead single from Ciara. It was sent to US urban contemporary radio on March 18, 2013 and to rhythmic contemporary radio on April 9, 2013. The single was well received by music critics who praised its "smooth R&B beat," while noting it as "legitimately clever" and comparing it to the work of Prince and R. Kelly. On the week ending April 28, 2013, "Body Party" debuted at number 35 on the US Billboard Hot 100, becoming Ciara's highest debut on the chart and the highest entry that week; it has since peaked at 22. It also ascended to number six on the US Billboard Hot R&B/Hip-Hop Songs chart, becoming her thirteenth top ten hit on that chart. The song became Ciara's first Top twenty-five hit on the former chart since her 2009 single "Love Sex Magic" with Justin Timberlake. Its accompanying music video tells the story of how Ciara met her boyfriend – rapper, Future – who also stars in the clip. The song's official remix, featuring B.o.B and Future, was released as a digital download in May 2013, and is included on physical editions of the album.

"I'm Out", featuring Nicki Minaj, premiered online on May 22, 2013 and was officially sent to urban radio in the US on June 3, 2013 as the album's second single. Additionally, it was the most added song to Canadian urban radio stations during the week of June 7, 2013. The song's music video was inspired by Michael and Janet Jackson's "Scream" music video and Marilyn Monroe, and premiered at the 2013 BET Awards pre-show on June 30, 2013. On the chart issue dated July 20, 2013, "I'm Out" debuted at number 50 on the US Billboard Hot 100, and peaked at 44 the following week.

In August 2013, Ciara confirmed that she would be releasing further singles from the album, the first "Where You Go" featuring Future would serve the American market whilst "Overdose" would serve international markets. However, in September 2013, Ciara confirmed that plans had changed and that "Read My Lips" would now be the album's third single as it was her favourite song, and that "it seems to be a song that my fans really love too, so we are both on the same page. Me and my fans are insync." The release of "Overdose" still went ahead; its single cover was unveiled on September 18, 2013. "Overdose" officially impacted Urban radio stations in the US on September 18, 2013 and a month later, it impacted Rhythmic stations.

== Critical reception ==
Professional ratings
Review scores
Source	Rating
AllMusic	4/5 stars
The A.V. Club	C+
Fact	4/5 discs
The Guardian	4/5 stars
Los Angeles Times	3/4 stars
The Observer	4/5 stars
Pitchfork Media	7.3/10
PopMatters	7/10
Slant Magazine	3/5 stars
Spin	8/10

Ciara received generally positive reviews from critics. At Metacritic, which assigns a normalized rating out of 100 to reviews from mainstream critics, the album received an average score of 72, based on 15 reviews. Writing for The Guardian, Alex Macpherson viewed the album as a high-quality addition to her already "formidable discography", particularly for its breadth. He also felt that the features from Nicki Minaj were welcome in a time where artists like Rihanna had maligned Ciara's previous work as commercial failures. Mikael Wood of the Los Angeles Times found "Keep on Lookin'" and "I'm Out" to be particular highlights, saying the rest of the album had a mellow sound compared to those tracks; he ultimately praised Ciara for not playing it safe, however, seeing her adventurous with both lyrics and production. Allmusic's Andy Kellman praised Ciara's use of producers and writers stating "the result isn't a muddled mess but another lean and focused set, despite the involvement of several writers and producers." Pitchfork Media's Tim Finney felt that Ciara improves the songs with her charisma and wrote that her "uncomplicated exhilaration raises the straightforward, 2013 carbon dated club-pop of 'Livin' It Up' and 'Overdose' from throwaway to highlight status, their obviousness transformed into a virtue through the singer's palpable enjoyment."

In a mixed review, Evan Rytlewski of The A.V. Club found the album to be too dance and R&B-oriented and felt that it should have explored her "airy voice", as found on singles like "Body Party", that recaptured the zeitgeist of her earlier work. At USA Today, Steve Jones said that "bass-fueled club bangers and libido-driven ballads tend to hit their mark but ultimately, don't leave a lasting impression." The Boston Globe's Ken Capobianco criticized the album for "missing a unique lyrical or musical vision", further elaborating, "we've heard these tropes before," and concluding their review that "now deep into her career, the real Ciara still proves elusive." Jon Carmanica of The New York Times found the production "vivid", but felt that Ciara's voice lacks personality and said that she sounds monotonous throughout the album.

=== Accolades ===
Pitchfork Media has named the lead single, "Body Party", as the fifth best song of 2013. Spin ranked "Body Party" at number 30 on its "50 Best Songs of 2013" list and the album at number four on its "20 Best R&B Albums of 2013" list. Fact listed the album at number 41 on its "50 Best Albums of 2013" list. Digital Spy ranked the album number twenty-four of the top albums of 2013. British website Popjustice ranked the album at number 17 on its "Top 33 Albums of 2013" list. The Village Voice ranked "Body Party" at number 12 on its "25 Best Songs of 2013" list.

== Commercial performance ==
Upon its release in the United States, the album was predicted to sell between 55–65,000 copies in its opening week, almost double the 37,000 copies her previous album Basic Instinct (2010) did. Ciara debuted at number two on the US Billboard 200 chart, selling 59,000 copies in its first week. The album became Ciara's fourth album to chart within the top three of the Billboard chart. The album also debuted at number two on the US Top R&B/Hip-Hop Albums becoming her second album to peak at that position. The also charted at number one on the US Top R&B Albums chart becoming her first album to debut at number one on the chart. As of April 2015, the album has sold 208,000 copies in the United States.

In other territories, the album debuted at number 42 on the UK Albums Chart. It fared better on the UK R&B Albums chart, where it opened at number 4. In the Netherlands, the album opened at number 77, becoming her first album to chart since 2004's debut set Goodies, which peaked at number 79, while in Switzerland the album debuted at number 63, Ciara's second lowest charting album in the country, charting 20 positions higher than her lowest charting album Basic Instinct did. The album debuted at number 35 in Australia becoming Ciara's first album to chart in the region since 2009, as well as becoming Ciara's highest peaking album on the chart.

== Track listing ==
No.	Title	Writer(s)	Producer(s)	Length
1.	"I'm Out" (featuring Nicki Minaj)	Theron Thomas; Timothy Thomas; Onika Maraj; Ciara Harris	Rock City; The Co-Captains	3:58
2.	"Sophomore"	Kenneth Coby; Harris	Soundz; Ciara^{[a]}	3:44
3.	"Body Party"	Harris; Nayvadius Wilburn; Jasper Cameron; Michael L. Williams II; Pierre "P-Nasty" Slaughter; Carlton Mahone; Rodney Terry	Mike Will Made-It; P-Nasty^{[b]}; Ciara^{[a]}; Wilburn^{[a]}	3:54
4.	"Keep on Lookin'"	Theron Thomas; Timothy Thomas; Harris	Rock City; Cameron Wallace	3:17
5.	"Read My Lips"	Harris; Rodney "Darkchild" Jerkins; Olivia Waithe	Jerkins; Tommy Lumpkins^{[a]}; Ciara^{[a]}	4:08
6.	"Where You Go" (featuring Future)	Williams II; Slaughter; Harris; Wilburn	Mike Will Made-It; P-Nasty^{[b]}; Ciara^{[a]}; Wilburn^{[a]}	3:43
7.	"Super Turnt Up"	Harris; Cameron	Ciara; Cameron	4:28
8.	"DUI"	Coby; Chris "The Rockstars" Llewellyn; Brian "The Rockstars" Cohen; Sean "Elijah Blake" Fenton; Harris	Soundz; The Rockstars; Kuk Harrell^{[a]}; Ciara^{[a]}	4:35
9.	"Livin' It Up" (featuring Nicki Minaj)	Dernst Emile II; Wynter Gordon; Harris; Maraj; Kenneth Carter; Walter Carter; Dave Ferguson; William Hull; Curtis Reynolds; Keith Samuels; Brian Sherrer	D'Mile	3:45
10.	"Overdose"	Josh Abraham; Oliver "Oligee" Goldstein; Ali Tamposi; Waithe; Harris	Abraham; Oligee; Harrell^{[a]}; Ciara^{[a]}	3:47
Total length:				39:38

iTunes Store bonus track
No.	Title	Writer(s)	Producer(s)	Length
11.	"Backseat Love"	Harvey Mason, Jr.; Damon Thomas; Harris; Dominque Logan; Darius Logan; Michael Jiminez; Dewain Whitmore; Steven Russell; Jeannine Sharp	The Underdogs; D&D^{[b]}	3:39
Total length:				43:02

CD bonus track
No.	Title	Writer(s)	Producer(s)	Length
11.	"Body Party" (Remix) (featuring Future and B.o.B)	Harris; Wilburn; Cameron; Williams II; Slaughter; Mahone; Terry; Bobby Simmons, Jr.	Mike Will Made-It; P-Nasty^{[b]}; Ciara^{[a]}; Wilburn^{[a]}	3:57
Total length:				43:20

United States Target and Japan bonus tracks
No.	Title	Writer(s)	Producer(s)	Length
12.	"Boy Outta Here" (featuring Rick Ross)	Mason, Jr.; Thomas; Blake "King X" Reynolds; Coby; Harris; William Roberts II	The Underdogs; King X	3:51
13.	"One Night with You"	Mason, Jr.; Thomas; Michael Jiminez; Steven Russell; Harris; Alexander "Fuego" Palmer	The Underdogs; Fuego	3:13
Total length:				50:24

=== Notes ===
- ^a signifies a vocal producer
- ^b signifies a co-producer
- "Super Turnt Up" credits Ciara as a featured artist, where she raps in the song.
- "Body Party" contains a sample of "My Boo" performed by Ghost Town DJ's, written by Carlton Mahone and Rodney Terry.
- "Livin' It Up" contains a portion of the composition "I Don't Know What It Is, But It Sure Is Funky" performed by Ripple.

=== Special editions ===
Four limited editions of the album featuring branded merchandise were available from Ciara's official artist store.

Summary of the contents of the four special editions of the album
Contents	Bundle title			
Contents	Keep on Lookin' Bundle	Super Turnt Up Bundle	Livin' It Up Bundle	Body Party Bundle
Album	check	check	check	check
Signed lithograph	check	X mark	X mark	X mark
Poster	X mark	check	check	check
T-shirt	X mark	check	X mark	check
Black or white beanie hat	X mark	check	check	X mark

== Personnel ==
Credits for Ciara adapted from Allmusic.

- Ciara – art direction, design, executive producer, featured artist, primary artist, vocal producer, background vocals
- Josh Abraham – producer
- Drew Adams – assistant
- Josie Aiello – background vocals
- B.o.B – featured artist
- Triana Bowman – production coordination
- LaTrice Burnette – marketing
- Brandon N. Caddell – assistant engineer
- Jasper Cameron – instrumentation, producer, vocal arrangement
- Nayvadius "Future" Cash – executive producer, vocal producer
- Lauren Ceradini – publicity
- Matt Champlin – engineer
- Ariel Chobaz – engineer
- The Co-Captains – instrumentation, producer, programming
- Paul "Hot Sauce" Dawson – scratching
- Briele Douglass – publicity
- Josh Drucker – assistant, mixing assistant
- Dernst Emile – producer
- Asiah'h Eperson – background vocals
- Seth Firkins – engineer
- Livvi Franc – background vocals
- Yolonda Frederick – make-up
- Joe Fritz – engineer
- Future – featured artist
- Dalia Glickman – A&R
- Kuk Harrell – vocal producer
- Ciara Harris – producer, vocal arrangement, vocal producer, background vocals
- Trehy Harris – assistant, mixing assistant
- James Hunt – assistant
- Jaycen Joshua – mixing
- Rodney Jerkins – instrumentation, mixing, producer
- Taryn Kaufman – A&R
- Dave Kutch – mastering
- Courtney Lowery – publicity
- Kim Lumpkin – production coordination
- Tommy Lumpkins – vocal producer
- The Madd Scientist – engineer
- Maria Paula Marulanda – art direction, design
- Harvey Mason, Jr. – engineer
- Susan McDonald – packaging manager
- Mike Will Made It – producer
- Nicki Minaj – featured artist
- Greg Morgan – sound design
- Vernon Mungo – engineer
- Luis Navarro – A&R
- Chris "Tek" O'Ryan – engineer
- Oligee – producer
- Keith Parry – engineer
- P-Nasty – producer
- Cesar Ramirez – hair stylist
- L.A. Reid – executive producer
- Rock City – producer
- The Rockstars – producer
- Heather Santos – A&R
- John Shullman – assistant
- Soundz – producer, vocal producer, background vocals
- Christopher "Tricky" Stewart – A&R
- Mark Stewart – A&R
- Ken Sunshine – publicity
- Theron Thomas – vocals
- Pat Thrall – engineer
- Dan Tobiason – engineer
- Stephen Villa – assistant
- Robert Wadlington – A&R
- Cam Wallace – programming
- Cameron Wallace – producer
- Ryan Williams – engineer
- Andrew Wuepper – engineer, mixing
- Yutsai – photography

== Charts ==
=== Weekly charts ===
Chart (2013)	Peak position
Australian Albums (ARIA)	35
Australian Urban Albums (ARIA)	7
Belgian Albums (Ultratop Flanders)	188
Belgian Albums (Ultratop Wallonia)	98
Canadian Albums (Billboard)	21
Dutch Albums (MegaCharts)	77
French Albums (SNEP)	163
South Korean Albums (Circle)	59
Swiss Albums (Hitparade)	63
UK Albums (OCC)	42
UK R&B Albums (OCC)	4
US Billboard 200	2
US Top R&B/Hip-Hop Albums (Billboard)	2

=== Year-end charts ===
Chart (2013)	Position
US Top R&B/Hip-Hop Albums (Billboard)	48

== Release history ==
Country	Date	Format	Label
Australia	July 5, 2013	CD; Digital download	Sony Music
Brazil	July 5, 2013	CD; Digital download	Sony Music
Germany	July 5, 2013	CD; Digital download	Sony Music
United Kingdom	July 8, 2013	CD; Digital download	RCA Records
United States	July 9, 2013	CD; Digital download	Epic Records
Canada	July 9, 2013	CD; Digital download	Sony Music
New Zealand	July 12, 2013	CD; Digital download	Sony Music
Japan	July 24, 2013	CD	Sony Music Japan
