= I Am Beautiful =

Single by Candice Glover
- Released: May 16, 2013
- Recorded: 2013
- Genre: Pop, R&B
- Length: 2:56
- Label: 19, Interscope
- Songwriters: Joleen Belle, Jaden Michaels
- Producers: Roahn Hylton, John Lock

Candice Glover singles chronology
"I Am Beautiful" (2013)	"Cried" (2013)

"I Am Beautiful" is the debut single and coronation song from American recording artist and American Idol season 12 winner, Candice Glover. The song was co-written by Joleen Belle and Jaden Michaels, and co-produced by Roahn Hylton and John Lock.

Her recording of "I Am Beautiful" was released as a single on May 16, 2013. An acoustic version of the song appeared on her debut album, Music Speaks as a bonus track. The original is not included on the album.

== Live performances ==
Glover first performed the song on the season's final performance night on May 15, 2013, and then again on the finale after she was declared the winner. Glover then performed the single on The Tonight Show with Jay Leno the following night. On May 20, 2013, Glover performed on Live! with Kelly and Michael.

== Track listing ==
Digital download
No.	Title	Length
1.	"I Am Beautiful"	2:56

== Chart performance ==
In its first week of release, the single sold 48,000 copies in the US. The song debuted at No. 5 on the R&B Digital Songs chart, No. 6 on the Heatseekers Songs chart, No. 33 on the Hot R&B/Hip-Hop Songs chart and No. 93 on the Hot 100. At the time, it was the lowest charting Idol winner single in history, until Caleb Johnson's "As Long as You Love Me" failed to enter the Hot 100.

== Charts ==
Chart (2013)	Peak position
US Billboard Hot 100	93
US Hot R&B/Hip-Hop Songs (Billboard)	33

== Release history ==
Country	Date	Format	Label
United States	May 16, 2013	Digital download	19 Recordings, Interscope
