= The Co-Captains =

American record production team

Background information
- Years active: 2007–present
- Members: Jovan J. Dawkins, Jevon Hill, Stanley Green Jr.

The Co-Captains are an American production team, consisting of Jovan J. Dawkins, Jevon Hill and Stanley Green Jr. They have produced songs for Travis Barker ("Sixteen"), Mario ("Music for Love") and Nelly ("U Know U Want To"). One of their most notable productions was for Ciara and Nicki Minaj's 2013 song "I'm Out", which debuted at No. 44 on the Billboard charts. The Co-Captains, who have also produced for Omarion and season 12 American Idol winner Candice Glover, credit part of their musical style and influences to Teddy Riley, Timbaland and Phil Collins. Dawkins is also the founder of Heritage Music Group, which earned five Grammy wins in 2018. Among those awards were R&B Album of The Year (Bruno Mars, 24K Magic), Song of The Year (Bruno Mars, "That's What I Like"), and Best R&B Song of The Year (Bruno Mars, "That's What I Like").

== Production credits ==
Year	Song	Artist	Album
2007	"Music for Love"	Mario	Go
2009	"Lucky Me"	Chris Brown	Graffiti
2009	"Movie"	Chris Brown	Graffiti
2009	"The Rebirth"	Bobby V.	The Rebirth
2009	"Hands on Me"	Bobby V.	The Rebirth
2009	"My Girl"	Bobby V.	The Rebirth
2009	"Butterfly Tattoo"	Bobby V.	The Rebirth
2009	"Be My Love"	Bobby V.	The Rebirth
2009	"Dance the Night Away"	Bobby V.	The Rebirth
2012	"Hallelujah"	T.I.	Trouble Man: Heavy Is the Head
2013	"I'm Out"	Ciara	Ciara
2013	"Know You Better"	Omarion	Self Made Vol. 3
2013	"U Know U Want To"	Nelly	M.O.
2014	"Damn"	Candice Glover	Music Speaks
2014	"Die Without You"	Candice Glover	Music Speaks
2014	"Kiss Me"	Candice Glover	Music Speaks
2014	"The Only One"	Omarion	Sex Playlist
2017	"Craving"	Tye Tribbett	Bloody Win
2017	"Everything In Me"	Sevyn Streeter	Girl Disrupted
2017	"Savage"	Tank	Savage
2017	"My Forever"	Tamar Braxton	Bluebird of Happiness
2017	"Savage"	Tank	Savage
2018	"You"	Snoop Dogg	Bible of Love
2019	"Tell me where it hurts"	Fred Hammond	Tell me where it hurts
2019	"He Won't"	Shanice	He Won't
2019	"Enough"	Fantasia	Enough

== Single credits ==
Year	Song	Artist
2012	"Sixteen"	Travis Barker
2014	"Rich"	Kirko Bangz feat. August Alsina
2018	"You"	Snoop Dogg feat. Tye Tribett
2018	"Tell Me Where It Hurts"	Fred Hammond
