= Music Speaks =

Studio album by Candice Glover
- Released: February 18, 2014
- Recorded: 2013
- Genres: R&B; soul
- Length: 44:32
- Labels: Interscope; 19
- Producers: The Co-Captains; Darkchild; D'Mile; Hot Sauce; The Jackie Boyz; Rob Kleiner; Macs & Vans; Mike Will Made-It; Rock City; The Underdogs

Singles from Music Speaks
- 1. "Cried" Released: November 25, 2013

Music Speaks is the debut studio album by American recording artist and American Idol twelfth season winner Candice Glover, released on February 18, 2014, by Interscope Records. It was preceded by the release of two digital singles, "I Am Beautiful" and "Cried". In the album, Glover combined the styling of contemporary R&B with 1960s-style lounge music.

== Background ==
Immediately following the broadcast on May 16, 2013, Music Speaks was made available for pre-order on iTunes. Originally scheduled for release on July 16, 2013, the album got pushed back twice, to October 8, 2013, and February 18, 2014. "Cried" was released to promote the album before its release.

== Promotion ==
Glover took part of the American Idols Live! Tour 2013, from July 19 to August 31, 2013, in which she performed Music Speaks tracks "In the Middle" and "Lovesong."

On January 5, 2014, she performed "Cried" at the Progressive Skating & Gymnastics Spectacular. On January 19, 2014, the song "Damn" leaked online, however, Glover stated she was ok with it.

On February 3, 2014, Glover did an exclusive performance of Music Speaks' tracks "Lovesong", "In the Middle" and "Cried" for Yahoo! Music. On February 10, 2014, she performed "Cried" at The View and on 106 & Park. On February 12, 2014, snippets of all songs were released by Yahoo! Music.

== Critical reception ==
Professional ratings
Aggregate scores
Source	Rating
Metacritic	62/100
Review scores
Source	Rating
AllMusic	3/5 stars
Idolator	4/5 stars
Los Angeles Times	2.5/5 stars
New York Daily News	4/5 stars
Rolling Stone	2.5/5 stars
Slant	2.5/5 stars

Music Speaks received generally favorable reviews. At Metacritic, which assigns a normalized rating out of 100 to reviews from mainstream publications, the album received an average score of 62, based on six reviews. Christopher R. Weingarten of Rolling Stone gave the album 2.5 stars out of 5, saying "American Idol's 12th victor deserves better than this much-delayed hodgepodge of styles and ideas. The voice that pushed Alicia Keys and U2 songs into unimagined octaves all season long – inspiring judge Nicki Minaj to say, "I want to skin you and wear you" – is on full display. But the songs reveal a serious identity crisis. An entire album of cosmopolitan Mark Ronson-esque pop soul like "Same Kinda Man" and the Shabba Ranks-interpolating "In the Middle" could have been revelatory. Instead, those highlights are jumbled between too many grooves that recall a vague, anonymous version of the decade between Jennifer Holliday and Mary J. Blige."

Mikael Wood of The Los Angeles Times gave the album a positive review, saying "There are signs of individual life here: the palpable regret in "Damn," about falling in love "with someone else's man"; the old-fashioned sass suffusing "In the Middle"; the tension between desire and virtue in "Passenger," with a characteristically woozy beat by producer Mike Will Made It. And, reprised from the show, there is Glover's powerful rendition of the Cure's "Lovesong," which may go down as the final must-see "Idol" performance. TV's loss is music's gain."

Jonathan Frahm of Yahoo! Voices lauded the album, saying "'Music Speaks' is a fantastic debut that is astoundingly exquisite in design, offering a homage to all eras of soul and, most importantly, Candice's prime talents." Continuing to praise Glover's musical ability, Frahm stated, "In knowing her musical journey is far from over and this is just the surprisingly refined beginning of her showcasing what she's able to do, whatever the more experienced artist in Candice Glover's future looks like, I'm sure I'm speaking for all R&B and Idol fans when I say it's going to be a tough wait for her based on the existing product's being so darn talented already."

The Daily News' Jim Farber also praised Glover's artistry, saying "It helps that her smooth voice sits so comfortably on the songs, content to illuminate their fine tunes rather than over-embellish them with flash."

== Commercial performance ==
The album debuted at No. fourteen on the Billboard 200 chart with sales of 19,000 for the week, at the time, the lowest first week sales of any American Idol winner. By its second week, the album had sold 27,000 copies.

== Track listing ==
No.	Title	Writer(s)	Producer(s)	Length
1.	"Cried"	Jazmine Sullivan, Anthony Taylor	The Underdogs, Taylor^{[a]}	3:20
2.	"Die Without You"	Timothy Thomas, Theron Thomas, Stanley Green, Theodore Thomas	Rock City, The Co-Captains	4:04
3.	"Same Kinda Man"	Richard Velonskis, Nikki Leonti, Norman Feels	Rob Kleiner, Harvey Mason, Jr.^{[b]}	3:58
4.	"Damn"	Timothy Thomas, Theron Thomas, Hill, Theodore Thomas	Rock City, The Co-Captains	3:43
5.	"Passenger"	Timothy Thomas, Theron Thomas, Michael Williams, Pierre Ramon Slaughter	Mike Will Made-It, P-Nasty^{[a]}, Hill^{[b]}, Rock City^{[b]}	4:36
6.	"Forever That Man"	Candice Glover, Carlos Battey, Steven Battey, Timothy "Christian Minor" Zimnoch, Jay Dmuchowski, Charles "Chizzy" Stephens III	The Jackie Boyz, Apex	4:12
7.	"Kiss Me"	Timothy Thomas, Theron Thomas, Hill, Theodore Thomas	Rock City, The Co-Captains	4:36
8.	"In the Middle"	Kleiner, Fantasia Barrino, Redd Stylez, Rexton Gordon, Wycliffe Johnson, Cleveland Constantine Browne, Greville Gordon	Kleiner, Mason, Jr.^{[b]}	3:51
9.	"Coulda Been Me"	Ester Dean, Marcos Palacios, Ernest Clark, Aaron Michael Cox	Darkchild, Hot Sauce, Da Internz^{[a]}	3:32
10.	"Thank You"	Anesha Birchett, Antea Shelton, Dernst "D'Mile" Emile II	D'Mile, Mason, Jr.^{[b]}	3:57
11.	"Love Song"	Simon Gallup, Roger O'Donnell, Robert Smith, Paul Thompson, Laurence Tolhurst	The Jackie Boyz, Apex	4:43
Total length:				44:32

ZinePak / iTunes Store bonus track
No.	Title	Writer(s)	Producer(s)	Length
12.	"I Am Beautiful" (Acoustic Version)	Jaden Michaels, Joleen Belle	The Jackie Boyz, Macs & Vans	3:11
Total length:				47:43

Notes

- ^{^[a]} signifies a co-producer
- ^{^[b]} signifies a vocal producer

Sampling credit

- "In the Middle" contains interpolations of "Ting-A-Ling", written by Rexton Gordon, Wycliffe Johnson, Cleveland Constantine Browne, and Greville Gordon.

== Charts ==
=== Weekly charts ===
Weekly chart performance for Music Speaks
Chart (2014)	Peak position
US Billboard 200	14
US Top R&B/Hip-Hop Albums (Billboard)	4
US Top R&B Albums (Billboard)	3

=== Year-end charts ===
2014 year-end chart performance for Music Speaks
Chart (2014)	Position
US Top R&B/Hip-Hop Albums (Billboard)	79
