= Overdose (Ciara song) =

Single by Ciara

from the album Ciara
- Released: September 18, 2013
- Recorded: Pulse Recording (Los Angeles, CA)
- Genre: Dance-pop; electropop; nu-disco
- Length: 3:47
- Label: Epic
- Songwriters: Josh Abraham; Oliver Goldstein; Ali Tamposi; Olivia Waithe; Ciara
- Producers: Josh Abraham; Oligee; Kuk Harrell; Ciara

Ciara singles chronology
"I'm Out" (2013)	"Overdose" (2013)	"I Bet" (2015)

Licensed audio
- "Ciara - Overdose (audio)" on YouTube

"Overdose" is a song recorded by American singer Ciara for her self-titled fifth studio album (2013). It was written by Josh Abraham, Oliver Goldstein, Ali Tamposi, Olivia Waithe and Ciara, while its production was handled by the former two. Ciara and Kuk Harrell were responsible for the song's vocal production. Notable for its shift from her more contemporary R&B sound towards a predominantly pop-orientated vocal style for the singer, "Overdose" served as a product of Ciara's experimentation and was recognized as the purest pop track on Ciara. An uptempo dance-pop, electropop and nu-disco song, its "club-friendly" production comprises rupturing synths and gritty, automatic beats. Its lyrical content act as an ode to codependency and are based on the subject of unhealthy infatuation.

"Overdose" initially leaked as an extended snippet on July 17, 2012, and then in full in June 2013. The song was originally recognized as a "fan favorite", before garnering favorable reviews from music critics, some of which went on to publish campaigns for the track be released as a single. Its accompanying artwork features Ciara's then-fiancé Future and resulted in widespread media attention for its provocative imagery. Though the song impacted urban contemporary and rhythmic contemporary radio in the United States—on September 18 and October 15, 2013, respectively—it failed to receive a full-scale single release, when its digital release was later cancelled and its accompanying music video and promotional performances failed to materialize. As a result, "Overdose" failed to enter the Billboard Hot 100 and garner success commercially.

== Background ==
"Overdose" was written by Josh Abraham, Oliver Goldstein, Ali Tamposi, Olivia Waithe and Ciara, while its production was handled by the former two. Ciara and Kuk Harrell were responsible for the song's vocal production, and Ciara's vocals were recorded by Ryan Williams at Pulse Recording, Los Angeles, CA. Background vocals on the track were provided by Ciara and House Aiello, and the song was engineered by Chris "TEK" Ryan. "Overdose" was mixed by Jaycen Joshua, with the assistance of Trehy Harris, at Larrabee Sound Studios in North Hollywood, CA. The song was then mastered by Dave Kutch at The Mastering Palace in New York City, NY. In an interview with GQ, Ciara discussed the development of "Overdose": "The song's got a throwback '80s vibe with a modern twist; I think that's unexpected. It's more a product of my experimentation—it has a vintage-y feel, but I feel like everyone can love it. And what's better than to dance to the feeling of love? The song's about embodying that energy."

== Release ==
"Overdose" initially leaked online on July 17, 2012, as an extended snippet, and was later rumored to serve as the second single from her fifth studio album, titled One Woman Army at the time. On April 30, 2013, Ciara hinted at a single release for the track in an interview with MuuMuse. In June 2013, a month prior to the release of Ciara, Epic Records accidentally released the album on Ciara's online store, before removing it a few minutes later. Due to the song's initial popularity as a snippet, it became the only non-single from the album to leak in full online during the accidental release. Epic, however, managed to cover up the majority of the full version's leak, during the build-up to the release of Ciara. Ciara later announced in an interview with Hollywood Life that "Overdose" would be released as a joint third single from Ciara with "Where You Go". She stated that it would serve as the album's third single in international markets, while "Where You Go" would be released in the United States.

However, on September 18, 2013, "Overdose" was announced as the third single from Ciara, in turn canceling initial plans for the release of "Where You Go". Ciara stated on Instagram that her fanbase played a considerable role in the song being chosen as a single. It was noted that thousands of her fanbase had rallied the single release for several months. With regard to the single release of "Overdose", Popjustice's Brad O'Mance commented, "Having faffed about for a bit, Ciara has finally come to her senses". MuuMuse's Bradley Stern published an article entitled, "Ciara Finally Makes 'Overdose' A Single, Restores Faith In Humanity," and later wrote, "Let us now form a prayer circle, call a doctor, get super turnt up and prepare to request 'Overdose' on the hotline". The single's cover artwork was premiered on the same day, resulting in widespread media attention for its provocative imagery. It garnered comparisons to Janet Jackson's 1993 Rolling Stone cover. The artwork features Ciara, with one hand grabbing the crotch of her then-fiancé Future, and the other down his underwear. Rap-Up deemed the cover "racy". O'Mance acknowledged its explicit imagery, describing it as "a lady lightly fingering a man's pubic hair with one hand, and his cock and balls with another". HipHollywood's Eric Berry wrote that some might find the artwork "questionable", later asking, "Artistic or sleazy?" Sam Lansky of Idolator called the artwork "typically provocative," adding, "Par for the course for the sultriest chick in the game". Other critics predicted that with the imagery, the single's accompanying music video would serve as an extension of the singer's video for "Body Party". It was announced that "Overdose" would impact radio and receive a digital release in the United States on October 14, 2013. However, Epic solicited the song to urban contemporary radio in the United States, the same day as its announcement as a single (September 18, 2013). It then impacted rhythmic contemporary radio in the United States on October 15, 2013. "Overdose" was scheduled for a release in the United Kingdom on December 16, 2013. Popjustice wrote, "if the video is anything like the artwork 'Overdose' could be the greatest UK Christmas Number One for about eight million years." However, the single's release in the country and an accompanying music video failed to materialize. According to Idolator, "Overdose" failed to receive a "proper single release".

== Composition ==
Notable for its shift from her more classical R&B sound towards a predominantly pop-orientated vocal style for the singer, "Overdose" was recognized as the "purest pop track" on Ciara. It is an uptempo, dance-pop, electropop, and nu-disco song. The track incorporates "club-friendly" production, made up of pounding EDM drums and rupturing synths, with elements of nu-disco, and funk. Comprising a club groove, and gritty, automatic beat, its sound garnered comparisons to the works of American singer Britney Spears, with whom its producers collaborated with on Femme Fatale (2011). The production in "Overdose" was noted by Katherine St. Asaph of MTV News to recall that of a "slightly less busy Dr. Luke". The track's chanting post-chorus, "Don't let, don't let, don't let go" was noted to be reminiscent of the pre-choruses in Lady Gaga's "Bad Romance" and Jordin Sparks' "Battlefield" (2009), and Spears' "Till the World Ends" (2011).

Its lyrical content act as an ode to codependency and are based on the subject of unhealthy infatuation. Some critics opined that "Overdose" served as description of Ciara's relationship with Future. It incorporates the theme of a drug overdose as a metaphor for love in a romantic relationship, with Ciara's love interest being depicted as a drug she is addicted to. Cheyenne Davis of SoulCulture viewed the lyrics as a "plea for help".

== Critical reception ==
"Not only could it be used as the official anthem for national drug prevention programs like D.A.R.E., but it will inspire today's youth to train to become EMTs, nurses and [...] surgeons. 'Overdose' on the charts equals a win for American healthcare. It's a massively catchy electro-pop stormer that could and should hit Top 10 on the Billboard Hot 100 if promoted properly by Epic. Even if it doesn't succeed, at least Ciara can say that she came out swinging with the best song that Ciara has to offer."

— Bradley Stern, MuuMuse

"Overdose" was originally recognized as a "fan favorite", before garnering favorable reviews from music critics, some of which went on to publish campaigns for the track be released as a single. Erika Ramirez of Billboard deemed "Overdose" the best the song on Ciara, and wrote that the track "appeals to fans of all genres, oozing funk and featuring an addictive hook". GQ journalist Stelios Phili called the track "club-ready". Idolator's Lansky named it as one of the album's best songs, quipping, "Prepare your body for yet another party". Opining that the song "actually [had] a fighting chance on mainstream radio", he said, "If there is any justice in the charts, it'll be a radio smash". Similarly to Ramirez and Lansky, USA Today also named the song as one of four highlights on Ciara. St. Asaph of MTV News opined that along with "Livin' It Up", "Overdose" had the most crossover potential on the record. Jordan Sargent of Spin called "Overdose" the album's "most striking" track and a "tasteful experiment". Writing for The New York Times, Jon Caramanica deemed the song "killer nu-disco". Andy Kellman of AllMusic felt that "Overdose" was "functional if not as memorable" as other tracks on the album. Pitchfork Media's Tim Finney opined that despite the track's "straightforward, 2013 carbon dated club-pop" sound, it was "perky electro-pop delivered with such frothy, wide-eyed innocence that it's hard to even notice the subject". Finney went on to write that its delivery and "uncomplicated exhilaration" raised it from "throwaway to highlight status" on Ciara. Finney's view was shared by Consequence of Sound's Michael Madden who said while the song was "musically unadventurous," its hooks were "packed tightly together, producing an especially memorable end" to the album. Madden went on to highlight "Overdose" as one of the record's three "essential" tracks. A writer for DJ Booth opined that "Overdose" was "intoxicating", "unforgettable" and "unrivaled", and called its production "irresistible". In a negative review, Fact felt that the "unnecessary dance-pop sheen" of the song "fell flat" and criticized its "unfortunate" use of metaphors. While Nick Henderson of Tiny Mix Tapes dismissed "Overdose" as an "uncharacteristic sidestep" and felt its sound was "uninspired" and its melodies "familiar".

== Credits and personnel ==
Recording

- Recorded at Pulse Recording, Los Angeles, CA.
- Mixed at Larrabee Sound Studios, North Hollywood, CA.
- Mastered at The Mastering Palace, New York City, NY.

Personnel

- Songwriting – Josh Abraham, Oliver Goldstein, Ali Tamposi, Olivia Waithe, Ciara
- Production – Josh Abraham, Oligee
- Engineer – Chris "TEK" O'Ryan
- Vocal recording – Ryan Williams
- Vocal recording – House Aiello, Ciara
- Vocal production – Kuk Harrell, Ciara
- Mixing – Jaycen Joshua
- Mixing assistant – Trehy Harris
- Mastering – Dave Kutch

Credits adapted from the liner notes of Ciara, Epic Records.

== Charts ==
Chart (2013-2014)	Peak position
Netherlands Urban (MegaCharts)	29
US Mainstream R&B/Hip-Hop Airplay (Billboard)	33

== Release history ==
Country	Date	Format	Label	Ref.
United States	September 18, 2013	Urban contemporary radio	Epic	
United States	October 15, 2013	Rhythmic contemporary radio	Epic	
