= Got Me Good (Ciara song) =

2012 single by Ciara

Single by Ciara
- Released: November 6, 2012
- Recorded: 2012
- Genre: Miami Bass; R&B; Dance-pop
- Length: 3:52
- Label: Epic
- Songwriters: Ciara Harris; Olivia Waithe; Rodney Jerkins
- Producer: Rodney Jerkins

Ciara singles chronology
"Sorry" (2012)	"Got Me Good" (2012)	"Body Party" (2013)

Music video
- "Got Me Good" on YouTube

"Got Me Good" is a song recorded by American singer Ciara. It was written by Ciara, Olivia Waithe and Rodney Jerkins, who also produced the song. "Got Me Good" premiered alongside its music video on Ciara's birthday, October 25, 2012, and was released as a digital download two weeks later on November 6, 2012. Epic Records serviced the single to rhythmic radio in the United States on November 13, 2012. The song was originally going to impact US contemporary hit radio on November 20, 2012, but was pushed back to December 4, 2012.

An accompanying music video, directed by Joseph Kahn, who also directed "Get Up" (2006), portrays Ciara dancing in the desert with dancers as well as the all-girl dance crew 8 Flavahz, who placed second on the seventh season of America's Best Dance Crew. The music video premiered on the Sony JumboTron in New York City's Times Square on October 25, 2012. Ciara has performed the song on Jimmy Kimmel Live! in the United States and performed the song at the VH1 Divas special, as part of her tribute to Michael Jackson. "Got Me Good" failed to chart in most countries it was released in, besides Belgium. Soon after, Ciara confirmed that the song would not be included on Ciara (2013).

== Background and composition ==
In an interview with Rap-Up magazine in May 2011, Jerkins confirmed that he had met with Ciara regarding the future of her career, stating "We had a long talk. I think she just has to get back to where she started, She had a lane that was specifically hers—that ghetto urban lane with the 808s. No female was doing that and she had it. I think if she just gets back to that, go back to the blueprint…", and went on to express that he had a desire to get into the studio and work with her. The two had previously worked together on Ciara's previous albums Ciara: The Evolution (2006) and Fantasy Ride (2009). In an interview with Broadcast Music Incorporated in March 2012, while elaborating on her future projects, songwriter, Ali Tamposi, announced that she and Livvi Franc (Olivia Waithe) would be doing the majority of the writing for the then-titled One Woman Army. Ciara went on to confirm that the songs from the sessions would be included on the album in an interview with Rap-Up in October 2012.

"Got Me Good" is an uptempo R&B song that lasts for three minutes and fifty-two seconds. The song was co-written by Ciara, Olivia Waithe, Rodney Jerkins, with Jerkins producing the song. "Got Me Good" samples the familiar girlhood rhyme but adds a twist, "My back is aching, my bra too tight, my booty's shaking from the left to the right" Ciara said that the lyrics in the song "want people walking away feeling good, when they hear this song, I want them to be inspired and motivated to dance and be free and to love." According to DJ Booth, the song features "ferociously danceable grooves fuse with the A-Town songstress’ flirtatious vocals" and a "high-energy cut meticulously crafted for club and radio rotation."

== Release and promotion ==
On September 10, 2012, Ciara's record label, Epic Records announced that "Got Me Good" would be the second single released from the album on October 8, 2012. However, on October 5, 2012, Ciara announced that its release would be pushed back due to her label deciding to send "Sorry" to both rhythmic and urban radio outlets, instead of solely to urban. In speaking on "Got Me Good"'s release, Ciara stated that she viewed it and its predecessor "Sorry" as the album's dual lead singles, stating "Those two just make a cool marriage. ‘Got Me Good’ is living in the moment of being ‘Got Good’. Like when someone makes you feel real good and no one can make you feel like they feel. So it's ‘you got me good’, then it's ‘you had me good’ and then it got to the point where a ‘Sorry’ was necessary." On October 20, 2012, Ciara announced that the song and its music video would premiere on her birthday, October 25, 2012 in Times Square. "Got Me Good" was released in North America, Australia, and select European countries via digital download on November 6, 2012. It impacted US Rhythmic radio on November 13, 2012 and mainstream radio on December 4, 2012, after originally being tipped to impact on November 20, 2012.

Ciara performed "Got Me Good" as well as "Sorry" and past hits, "Goodies", "1, 2 Step" and "Like a Boy", on Jimmy Kimmel Live! on her birthday, October 25, 2012. The performance of "Got Me Good", however, was not televised and only the "Sorry" performance was shown. She performed the song live on December 16, 2012, as part of the VH1 Divas special during her tribute to Michael Jackson. Her backup dancers included Camren Bicondova, Kaelynn Gobert-Harris, Jaira Miller, Charlize Glass, Tiara Rapp, and Angel Gibbs of the dance crew 8 Flavahz, who had previously appeared in the music video.

== Critical reception ==
Generally, "Got Me Good" received positive reviews. Yahoo! Music Canada praised the song, stating that Ciara was "back." They also said the song "is an even more pop-edged '1, 2 Step,' reminiscent of the electronic, fast-paced rhythms of 1980s girl rappers J.J. Fad, L'Trimm, and MC Luscious." Rap-Up called the song "dance-floor ready." The Insider called the song a "sexy, dance-filled romp." Popcrush.com praised the song calling it a "fiery new dance single" continuing to say "Ciara took her ferocious dancing feet and completely squashed the competition in last week’s About to Pop poll. The R&B diva’s latest single, the fast-paced, ’90s-inspired dance jam ‘Got Me Good,’ garnered more than 65% of the fan votes, meaning all of you can get groove on to the club-ready track this weekend when it receives 20+ spins on PopCrush's radio show". As of the end of 2012, "Got Me Good" failed to chart on any of the US Billboard charts.

== Music video ==
=== Background and concept ===
"Today was nothing but dancing and dancing and more dancing and a little bit of driving in my Jeep as well, It was really hot — like burning hot. It was different, and I've never driven the way that I did in the video with [director] Joseph [Kahn] shooting the way that he did, and that was also really fun, and it made it feel very special."

— Ciara, speaking on the video .

The music video for "Got Me Good" was directed by Joseph Kahn, who also directed "Get Up" (2006). It was filmed in September 2012 in the California desert. The first of three behind-the-scenes videos was released online on October 21, 2012. The second behind-the-scenes 30 second snippet of the music video premiered online on October 22, 2012. The third and final snippet of the video premiered online on October 24, 2012. The full video premiered on the Sony JumboTron in Times Square in New York City on October 25, 2012.

Ciara spoke on the concept of the video saying the following "It’s so exciting! It was so much energy. We actually rocked in the desert and it was like 108 degrees. It was so hot, but I feel like the energy of dance and working with 8 Flavahz and my dancers just kinda kept me really upbeat. I didn’t even recognize how hot it was and I thank God for the umbrella man because he also saved me. It’s non-stop dancing. The [sneak peek] that I gave was the only snippet that I could find where there wasn’t dancing ’cause I didn’t want to give it away. We are literally moving from top to bottom and having fun. I feel like that’s very important. The record’s a very fun song and it’s also with a love energy, but fun and light. I just felt it was kinda cool to bring that energy through the dance."

=== Synopsis ===
The music video opens with a view of head phone's lying in the open desert, inter changing with a scene of a jeep in which Ciara is driving. The video continues with Ciara dancing in the street in a white outfit with a dancer who is wearing a black outfit As the video progresses Ciara is shown in the desert doing a choreography with a group of back up dancers. Ciara is shown again in the jeep with members of the back up dancers this switches back and forth with a solo choreography, Ciara is then joined by two male dancers. Ciara is joined by a group of dancers as they dance in front of three Jeeps. In the following scene performing choreography with backup dancers as well as the all-girl dance crew 8 Flavahz, who placed second on the seventh season of MTV's America's Best Dance Crew. The final scene is of Ciara dancing in the twilight with two dancers in which they run off into the distance.

=== Reception ===
Upon its release, the video received positive response from critics. Idolator compared Ciara and the video to many other artist's saying "There’s plenty of that Britney-esque white turtleneck. The video also follows in the long, strong tradition of female pop stars in the desert, alluding to the stomping dance moves of Mya‘s "Case Of The Ex" and the cars from M.I.A.‘s "Bad Girls". "Got Me Good" was compared to the work of Janet Jackson by DJ Booth in which they said "The accompanying visuals show Ciara performing some dance moves likely to elicit Janet Jackson comparisons from seasoned R&B/pop connoisseurs."

== Formats and track listing ==
Digital download

1. "Got Me Good" – 3:52

== Charts ==
Chart (2012)	Peak position
Belgium (Ultratip Bubbling Under Flanders)	40
Belgium (Ultratip Bubbling Under Wallonia)	26
Belgium Urban (Ultratop Flanders)	47

== Radio and release history ==
Country	Date	Format	Label
France	November 6, 2012	Digital download	Sony Music
Germany	November 6, 2012	Digital download	Sony Music
Italy	November 6, 2012	Digital download	Sony Music
Spain	November 6, 2012	Digital download	Sony Music
United States	November 6, 2012	Digital download	Epic Records
United States	November 13, 2012	Rhythmic radio	Epic Records
United States	December 4, 2012	Mainstream radio	Epic Records
