= Body Party =

Single by Ciara

from the album Ciara
- Released: March 8, 2013
- Recorded: Triangle Sound Studios (Atlanta); Jungle City Studios (New York City)
- Genre: R&B
- Length: 3:54
- Label: Epic
- Songwriters: Ciara Harris; Jasper Cameron; Nayvadius "Future" Wilburn; Michael L. Williams II; Pierre Ramon Slaughter; Carlton Mahone; Rodney Terry
- Producers: Mike Will Made It; P-Nasty; Ciara; Future

Ciara singles chronology
"Got Me Good" (2012)	"Body Party" (2013)	"I'm Out" (2013)

Music video
- "Body Party" on YouTube

"Body Party" is a song recorded by American singer-songwriter Ciara for her self-titled fifth studio album (2013). It was written by Ciara, Jasper Cameron, Nayvadius "Future" Wilburn, Michael Williams, Pierre Ramon Slaughter, Carlton Mahone, Rodney Terry, and was produced by Mike Will Made It. The song premiered on March 4, 2013, via Billboard.com and was released as a digital download on March 8, 2013, as the lead single of her fifth album. Epic Records serviced the single to Rhythmic contemporary radio in the United States on April 9, 2013. Musically, "Body Party" is a down-tempo R&B song that samples "My Boo" by Ghost Town DJ's.

"Body Party" received positive reviews from critics who praised the slow synthesized production akin to songs by Prince and R. Kelly. Rolling Stone ranked "Body Party" at number 22 for The Best Songs of 2013, which made it the highest R&B song on the list. In the US, the song peaked at number six on the Hot R&B/Hip-Hop Songs and at number 22 on the Billboard Hot 100. It was eventually certified double platinum by the Recording Industry Association of America (RIAA).

The song's accompanying music video, shot by Director X, tells a story of the first time when Ciara and Future met. Aside from Future, the video featured cameo appearances from artists including Trinidad James and Ludacris. The video received positive reviews from critics as well as from musical peer Nicki Minaj. The song's official remix was released on May 16, 2013 and features Future and B.o.B. Ciara performed the single for the first time on Jimmy Kimmel Live! in June 2013. The video was nominated for Best Choreography at the 2013 MTV Video Music Awards, but lost to Treasure by Bruno Mars, but won for "Best Dance Performance" at the 2013 Soul Train Music Awards.

== Background and release ==
After releasing two under performing albums, Fantasy Ride (2009) and Basic Instinct (2010), Ciara publicly asked to be released from her label Jive. In July 2011, reports circulated that Ciara had reunited with L.A. Reid by signing with his record label Epic Records. Reid had previously signed Ciara to LaFace Records during the beginning of her career and was a factor in the commercial success of her debut album, Goodies (2004). Billboard magazine went on to confirm her move to Epic in September 2011. In February 2012, Ciara revealed that she had begun recording her album. Ciara released three singles from the album: "Sweat" featuring rapper, 2 Chainz, "Sorry" and "Got Me Good", all of which performed poorly on any major charts. The three singles were later scrapped with "Body Party" being released as the album's lead single.

On March 1, 2013, via Twitter, Ciara tweeted, "My Body Is Your Party Baby...Nobody's Invited but U Baby," which was later confirmed to be lyrics from "Body Party". The same day, Ciara released the artwork for the single as well as a 42-second snippet. "Body Party" had its official premiere on March 4, 2013 on Billboard.com. While speaking to Billboard about the song, Ciara said, "Let's just say that this record came out of a very sincere place. I think when things just organically feel right, naturally good things come from it". "Body Party" was released as a digital download on March 12, 2013, as the 1st single from Ciara's fifth studio album, Ciara. On the week of March 18, 2013, "Body Party" was the most added song on urban radio. It impacted rhythmic radio in the United States on April 9, 2013.

== Composition ==
"Body Party" (2013)
A 24 second sample of Ciara's "Body Party".

"Body Party" was written by mainly Ciara and Jasper Cameron, with assistance from Future, Michael L. Williams, Pierre Ramon Slaughter, Carlton Mahone, and Rodney Terry. Lasting for three minutes and fifty four seconds and being produced by Mike WiLL Made It, "Body Party" is a mid-tempo R&B song that samples "My Boo" (1996) by Ghost Town DJ's. The first verse introduces the concept of the song: "My body is your party, baby/ Nobody's invited but you baby/ I can do it slow now, tell me what you want." According to MTV Buzzworthy, the song is built around the idea of Ciara promising her body to her "man." in this song, Ciara displays a vocal range spanning 2 octaves, from the low note of (E3) to the high belted note of (E5).

== Critical reception ==
"Body Party" received positive reviews, with many praising the production. Jeff Benjamin of Fuse called the song a "slinky, synthy" track, while Madeline Boardman of The Huffington Post complimented the "smooth R&B beat." Rich Juzwiak of Gawker praised the song, saying that it is "something sex jams by people other than Prince and R. Kelly rarely are: legitimately clever." He also complimented the beat, noting that the "My Boo" sampling song is able to "achieve an extremely modern atmosphere in its open nostalgia." Also speaking on the single cover for the song, Juzwiak stated that "Ciara does Janet's baby-making legacy proud." VH1's Bené Viera claimed that Ciara had "hit gold" and complimented the beat, saying that it "knocks." Idolator heavily praised the song, calling it "ingeniously sultry, seductive," continuing to say "Body Party" is "arguably her best slow burner since Promise." Spin also praised the song and compared it to "Promise," calling it a "steamy, airless ballad, in which the drums don't hit as much as they exhale."

== Commercial performance ==
On the issue dated March 30, 2013, "Body Party" debuted at number 39 on the Billboard Hot R&B/Hip-Hop Songs chart, and has since peaked at number six, making it her thirteenth top ten hit on that chart. On the chart issue dated May 11, 2013, the song debuted at number 35 on the Billboard Hot 100, the highest debut that week, becoming Ciara's first Top 40 song on the chart since her 2009 single "Love Sex Magic" with Justin Timberlake. The same week, the song debuted at number 10 on the Billboard Streaming Songs chart with 3.8 million streams and rose to number 2 on the Billboard R&B Songs chart, making it her first top ten on the chart. On the chart dated July 27, 2013, the song reached its current peak of twenty-two. The song is Ciara's first to receive a gold certification in the United States since "Can't Leave 'em Alone". As of 2019, "Body Party" is certified double platinum.

== Music video ==
"For me, the mission is to take you back to that day when guys weren't too cool to dance in the club. They weren't acting too cool to slow dance with a girl in the club."

— Ciara, speaking on the concept of the video.

The music video for "Body Party" was directed by Director X and filmed in Atlanta, Georgia. On April 20, 2013, Ciara released a thirty-second teaser of the song's video. The music video premiered on VEVO and 106 & Park on April 22, 2013. The video features cameos from Ludacris, Trinidad James, Jazze Pha, and Stevie J and Joseline Hernandez of Love & Hip Hop: Atlanta. The concept of the video is about how she met her new boyfriend, Future, who is also featured in the video. Speaking to MTV News on the direction of the video, Ciara stated, "It's about giving you the sensual emotion that's in the record, but also the fun. It was really important to me that there was a perfect balance of the two."

The music video opens with a view of Ciara's face which is quickly followed with a silhouette of Ciara dancing. The two scenes switch multiple times. As the video progresses the video moves to Ciara walking into a party which is followed by Ciara mingling with people at the party. She is then joined by two dancers and they begin to perform a short routine. After the routine she walks over to Future and the music stops at a "manor house". The song by Future, "Karate Chop" can also be heard in the background. There is small dialogue between the two where Ciara is "flirting with Future" saying "Oh, so you been watching me," with Future responding saying "You're not hard to miss," and thereafter the music resumes. The scene then changes to Ciara and Future in a bedroom where Future is sat smoking a cigar while Ciara is giving him a private striptease, dancing on the floor and around him in black lace lingerie and black heels. Once again the music stops and Ciara and Future share another scene where they share a dialogue, the music continues again. The video finally ends with Ciara and Future at the party dancing together.

The video gained positive views from music critics. Rap-Up called the video "sensual" and compared it to Janet Jackson's That's the Way Love Goes" while Idolator called the video a "sexy shindig." The video also gained support from musical peer Nicki Minaj, who praised the dance choreography via Twitter. The video garnered more than a million views in less than 24 hours and has since peaked at #1 on 106 and Park after 3 days of being on the countdown. Spin magazine praised the video, particularly noting the conversation between Ciara and Future, saying that they had a "connection in their gazes." The video has garnered 166 million views since its release. It was also nominated for Best Choreography at the 2013 MTV Video Music Awards. The video was chosen as one of the Top 40 of 2013 by Fuse. As of January 2015, Billboard named the video for "Body Party" one of the 20 best music videos of 2010s (so far).

== Remixes ==
An extended play featuring dance remixes of "Body Party" by producers, Dave Aude (loosely inspired by Inner City's signature sound), Ralvero, and Misterharding was released via digital download on May 3, 2013. On May 16, 2013, Ciara released the official remix to "Body Party" featuring Future and B.o.B. The remix features a sped-up sample of Ghost Town DJ's "My Boo." The remix was released as a digital download on May 31, 2013 and is featured on the physical version of the album as a bonus track. An additional remix entitled the "Gentlemen's Remix" featuring Ne-Yo premiered online on June 13, 2013.

== Promotion ==
Ciara performed the song for the first time on Jimmy Kimmel Live! on June 5, 2013. She also included the song as a part of her set list while headlining the 2013 L.A. Gay Pride Festival in West Hollywood on June 9, 2013. Ciara performed the song for a third time at the Musicalize festival in London on June 14, 2013, where she was the headliner. The song was used in the Season 2 finale of the Lifetime TV show The Client List. She performed the song along with "I'm Out" at the 2013 BET Awards.

== Accolades ==
Publication	Country	Accolade
Pitchfork Media	The Top 100 Tracks of 2013	5
Pitchfork Media	The 200 Best Tracks of the Decade So Far (2010-2014)	39
Spin	50 Best Songs of 2013	30
The Village Voice	The 25 Best Songs of 2013	12
Billboard	20 best songs of 2013 Critics Picks	11
Complex	Best Songs of 2013 So Far	21

== Credits and personnel ==
Recording

- Triangle Sound Studios (Atlanta, Georgia)
- Jungle City Studios (New York City)

Personnel

- Songwriting – Ciara Harris, Nayvadius "Future" Cash, Michael L. Williams II, Pierre Ramon Slaughter, Carlton Mahone, Rodney Terry
- Production – Mike Will Made It, P-Nasty, Ciara, Future

== Track listing ==
Digital download

1. "Body Party" – 3:58

Remixes – EP

1. "Body Party" (Dave Audé club remix) – 7:18
2. "Body Party" (Dave Audé radio edit) – 3:48
3. "Body Party" (Dave Audé Mixshow) – 5:27
4. "Body Party" (Dave Audé instrumental) – 7:17
5. "Body Party" (Dave Audé Dub remix) – 6:16
6. "Body Party" (Ralvero remix) – 5:12
7. "Body Party" (Ralvero instrumental) – 5:12
8. "Body Party" (Misterharding remix) – 4:53
9. "Body Party" (Misterharding radio edit) – 4:00

== Charts ==
=== Weekly charts ===
Chart (2013)	Peak position
Belgium (Ultratip Bubbling Under Flanders)	88
Belgium (Flanders Ultratip Urban)	43
UK Singles (OCC)	174
US Billboard Hot 100	22
US Hot R&B/Hip-Hop Songs (Billboard)	6
US Dance Club Songs (Billboard)	1
US Rhythmic Airplay (Billboard)	13

=== Year-end charts ===
Chart (2013)	Position
US Billboard Hot 100	83
US Hot R&B/Hip-Hop Songs (Billboard)	19
US Rhythmic (Billboard)	50

== Certifications ==
Region	Certification	Certified units/sales
New Zealand (RMNZ)	Platinum	30,000^{‡}
United Kingdom (BPI)	Silver	200,000^{‡}
United States (RIAA)	2× Platinum	2,000,000^{‡}
^{‡} Sales+streaming figures based on certification alone.

== Release history ==
Country	Date	Format	Label
New Zealand	March 8, 2013	Digital download	Sony Music
France	March 12, 2013	Digital download	Sony Music
Germany	March 12, 2013	Digital download	Sony Music
United Kingdom	March 12, 2013	Digital download	Epic Records
United States	March 12, 2013	Digital download	Epic Records
United States	April 9, 2013	Rhythmic radio	Epic Records
United States	May 3, 2013	Digital Remixes EP	Epic Records

== See also ==
- List of number-one dance singles of 2013 (U.S.)
