= 8 Flavahz =

American all-female dance crew

- Origin: Honolulu, Hawaii; Los Angeles, California
- Genres: Hip-hop dance, jazz dance
- Years active: 2011–2015
- Past members: Angel Gibbs; Camren Bicondova; Charlize Glass Jaira Miller; Kaelynn Gobert-Harris; Summer Waikiki; Tamara Rapp (also with I.aM.mE); Tiara Rapp
- Website: http://www.8flavahz.com/

8 Flavahz is an all-female dance crew originally based in both Honolulu, Hawaii and Los Angeles, California. They are best known for being the runners-up of the seventh season of MTV's America's Best Dance Crew.

The crew consists of eight members: Angel Gibbs, Camren Bicondova, Charlize Glass, Jaira Miller, Kaelynn Gobert-Harris, Summer Waikiki, Tamara Rapp and Tiara Rapp.

Outside of the crew, Bicondova portrayed young Selina Kyle/Catwoman in the Batman prequel TV series Gotham from 2014 to 2019.

== History ==
=== Before 8 Flavahz ===
Before forming 8 Flavahz with its current lineup, the crew was known as Flavahs Crew and consisted of eight girls from the Hawaiian dance studio 24VII. The original crew had auditioned for the sixth season of America's Best Dance Crew, but did not make the cut. Although they did not make it onto the show in season 6, they were encouraged to return to try out for the next season by ABDC judge D-Trix.

=== Formation ===
In 2011, after failing to make it onto the sixth season of MTV's America's Best Dance Crew, the Hawaiian girls - twin sisters Tiara and Tamara, Camren, and Summer - attended a dance convention in Los Angeles, where they met their L.A. counterparts - Kaelynn, Jaira, Angel, and Charlize. The Hawaiian girls then invited the four L.A. girls to join them and their crew to compete in World of Dance Hawaii. Under the name Flavahs and Friends, they competed in World of Dance Hawaii and placed in third. Three of the Hawaiian girls - Tiara, Tamara, and Summer - were also a part of another group that was competing in the same competition, named 24VII Danceforce, in which they were crowned the winners. After placing third in World of Dance Hawaii, it was decided that the four Hawaiian girls would form a new group with the four L.A. girls and they were officially dubbed 8 Flavahz. With their newly formed group, the girls were ready to audition once again for the next season of America's Best Dance Crew, placing second in the competition.

== Members ==
Name	Age	Hometown	Flavah
Tiara "Ti" Rapp	31	Honolulu, Hawaii	Pomegranate (Pink)
Tamara "Tam" Rapp	31	Honolulu, Hawaii	Cherry (Red)
Kaelynn 'KK" Gobert-Harris	30	Los Angeles, California	Tropicana (Orange)
Jaira "Jay" Miller	28	Los Angeles, California	Kiwi (Green)
Angel Gibbs	26	Los Angeles, California	Grape (Purple)
Camren "Cam Cam" Bicondova	26	San Diego, California	Blue Razzle (Aqua)
Summer "Sum" Waikiki	26	Kaneohe, Hawaii	Blueberry (Blue)
Charlize "Char Char" Glass	24	Los Angeles, California	Zesty Lemon (Yellow)

== America's Best Dance Crew ==
Week	Superstar Artist	Challenge	Music	Result
1	Britney Spears	None	"3" by Britney Spears	Safe
2	Flo Rida	None	N/A	N/A
3	Madonna	Incorporate voguing	"Vogue" by Madonna	Safe
4	Drake	Become connected at some point	"Find Your Love" by Drake	Safe
5	Jennifer Lopez	Incorporate salsa dancing, and trumpets	"Let's Get Loud" by Jennifer Lopez	Safe
6	Pitbull	Incorporate can-can in their routine	"Hey Baby" by Pitbull featuring T-Pain	Safe
7	Rihanna	Create a fire effect and extinguish it	"Birthday Cake" by Rihanna	Safe
8	LMFAO	Recreate the group blow-up from the video, and incorporate "The T-step" and "The SpongeBob".	"Party Rock Anthem" by LMFAO featuring Lauren Bennett and GoonRock	Safe|
9	David Guetta	Incorporate gliding, gloving and dance like dolls	Gloving: "Memories" by David Guetta featuring Kid Cudi; Gliding: "Without You" by David Guetta featuring Usher; Dancing like dolls: "Turn Me On" by David Guetta featuring Nicki Minaj	Safe
10	Katy Perry	None	"Last Friday Night (T.G.I.F.)" by Katy Perry (with We Are Heroes)	Runners-up

== Appearances ==
=== Movies ===
Year	Title	Members	Role	Ref
2012	Battlefield America	Camren	Prissy	

=== Music videos ===
Year	Title	Artist	Members	Ref
2010	"Blowing Me Kisses"	Soulja Boy	Kaelynn	
2010	"Whip My Hair"	Willow Smith	Angel, Charlize	
2010	"Waka Waka (This Time For Africa)"	Shakira	Angel	
2011	"Mrs. Right"	Mindless Behavior	Kaelynn	
2011	"Girls Talkin' Bout"	Mindless Behavior	Kaelynn, Jaira, Charlize	
2012	"Valentine's Girl"	Mindless Behavior	Kaelynn, Jaira	
2012	"Hello"	Mindless Behavior	Kaelynn	
2012	"Be Mine"	Bruno Moneroe	Tiara	
2012	"Bad for Me"	Megan and Liz	Kaelynn	
2012	"Got Me Good"	Ciara	All except Tiara	
2013	"Girls Just Gotta Have Fun"	Sophia Grace	Charlize	
2013	"Lolly"	Maejor Ali, Juicy J, Justin Bieber	Charlize	
2014	"Good Kisser"	Usher	Kaelynn	
2014	"Enjoy the Ride"	Krewella	Camren	
2014	"L.A. Love (La La)"	Fergie	Kaelynn	
2014	"Spark the Fire"	Gwen Stefani	Kaelynn	

=== Television ===
Year	Title	Members	Role	Ref
2010	2010 MTV Video Music Awards	Angel	Justin Bieber's Backup Dancer	
2011	Shake It Up	Camren, Angel	Fake Highlighters	
2011	2011 MTV Video Music Awards	Kaelynn, Angel, Charlize	Britney Spears Tribute Dancers	
2011	2011 BET Awards	Angel, Charlize	Kevin Hart's Backup Dancers	
2011	America's Got Talent	Angel, Charlize	Dancers	
2011	Dancing With The Stars	Angel	Dancer	
2011	2011 Kids' Choice Awards	Camren	Dancer	
2011	So You Think You Can Dance	Charlize	Dancer from Rage Crew	
2011	The Voice	Charlize, Angel	Cee Lo Green's Backup Dancer	
2012	The Fresh Beat Band	Charlize	Dancer	
2012	The Ellen DeGeneres Show	Kaelynn, Jaira	Mindless Behavior's Backup Dancers	
2012	The Ellen DeGeneres Show	Charlize	Celebrity Guest	
2012	Maury	Charlize	Dancer on Maury's Mini Idol	
2012	America's Best Dance Crew	All	Competing crew	
2012	Hawaii News Now	Tiara, Tamara, Summer	Guests	
2012	KHON2	Tiara, Tamara, Summer	Guests	
2013	2013 Kids' Choice Awards	Camren, Angel	Pitbull and Christina Aguilera back-up dancers	
2013	Dancing With The Stars	Charlize, Angel	Dancing with Zendaya	
2013	Glee	Kaelynn	Throat Explosion Dancer	
2014	The Voice	Kaelynn	Usher's backup dancer	
2014	BET Awards	Kaelynn	Usher's backup dancer	
2014	The Today Show	Kaelynn	Usher's backup dancer	
2014	Gotham	Camren	Selina Kyle / Young Catwoman	
2014	American Music Award	Kaelynn	Fergie's backup dancer	
2015	Gotham	Camren	Selina Kyle / Young Catwoman	
2015	The Today Show	Jaira	Guest / Dancer	
