= I'm Out =

Single by Ciara featuring Nicki Minaj

from the album Ciara
- Released: May 22, 2013
- Recorded: 2012–13
- Genre: Electro-R&B
- Length: 3:57
- Label: Epic
- Songwriters: Timothy Thomas; Theron Thomas; Onika Maraj; Ciara Harris
- Producers: The Co-Captains; Rock City

Ciara singles chronology
"Body Party" (2013)	"I'm Out" (2013)	"Overdose" (2013)

Nicki Minaj singles chronology
"Somebody Else" (2013)	"I'm Out" (2013)	"#Twerkit" (2013)

Music video
- "I'm Out (Explicit)" on YouTube

"I'm Out" is a song recorded by American recording artist Ciara, for her self-titled fifth studio album (2013), featuring guest vocals from rapper Nicki Minaj. It was written by Ciara, Minaj and Rock City brothers, Timothy and Theron Thomas. Rock City and The Co-Captains provided production. "I'm Out" made its premiere on May 22, 2013, on Ciara's official SoundCloud account and was serviced to urban radio in the United States on June 3, 2013, as the second single from Ciara through Epic Records. The lyrics address the themes of breakups and making an ex-boyfriend regret leaving.

"I'm Out" was met with general acclaim from music critics, with some praising Ciara for returning to "her ghetto origins" and being "defiant and strong" on the single, while one even called it an "essential" and the album's "best cut." Upon release, the single debuted at number 50 making a "hot shot debut" on the US Billboard Hot 100 and number fifty-four on the UK Singles Chart. The song also made appearances on the Australian, Canadian and French charts.

The song's music video was directed by Hannah Lux Davis and depicts strong choreography with Ciara taking influence from "Scream", performed by Michael and Janet Jackson. The video premiered live at the BET Awards Pre Show on June 30, 2013, followed by a live performance of the song alongside Nicki Minaj. The song was further promoted by performances on Jimmy Kimmel Live!, Good Morning America and BET's 106 & Park.

== Background and release ==
After collaborating with Nicki Minaj on the song "I'm Legit" for Minaj's album Pink Friday: Roman Reloaded – The Re-Up, Minaj agreed to appear on Ciara's album in return. Originally, the duo had worked on just one collaboration for Ciara called "I'm Out." Speaking about Minaj's verse on the song, Ciara said, "The energy of the record is so dope, and it's really for the ladies, and Nicki she just killed the verse. She literally murdered it, like she got that throw-back, that thing that she does that's so special. She went in." Having enjoyed the process, Minaj said, "I was supposed to only do one song for her album and I think I'm going to end up doing two. I just love what she's doing and I'm so proud and I'm really excited for people to hear it." In April, Ciara confirmed that Minaj was finished with a second record for the album; in an interview with MTV News, Ciara said, "She's actually finishing up one now that's really it's a monster too. The moments that we have had so far have just been crazy. It's just been magical, it's been something special and I feel like the fans have always wanted to see she and I rock together." "I'm Out" premiered on May 22, 2013, via Ciara's official SoundCloud account. It was officially sent to urban radio in the US on June 3, 2013. Additionally, it was the most added song at Canadian urban radio stations on June 7, 2013. "I'm Out" was released in the United Kingdom on July 8, 2013.

== Composition ==
"I'm Out" is an electro-R&B song. It features rapper Nicki Minaj and was produced by The Co-Captains. It has a "fierce clapping beat" and a "sweet pop chorus", and features a "loud and bass-heavy" sound. MTV Buzzworthy called the song an "energetic, clap-laced, synth-laden track". The song opens with a "gritty opening verse" and "aggressive bars" from Minaj followed by Ciara lyrically speaking on the subject of going through a breakup and making her ex-boyfriend regret leaving her. The verse for the song introduces the concept "If you know that you better than the new girl that he on, go 'head and tell him now you gon' miss me when I'm gone". Entertainment Weekly described it as a type of electro-kissed swaggering sass factory that makes for a great summer jam.

== Critical reception ==
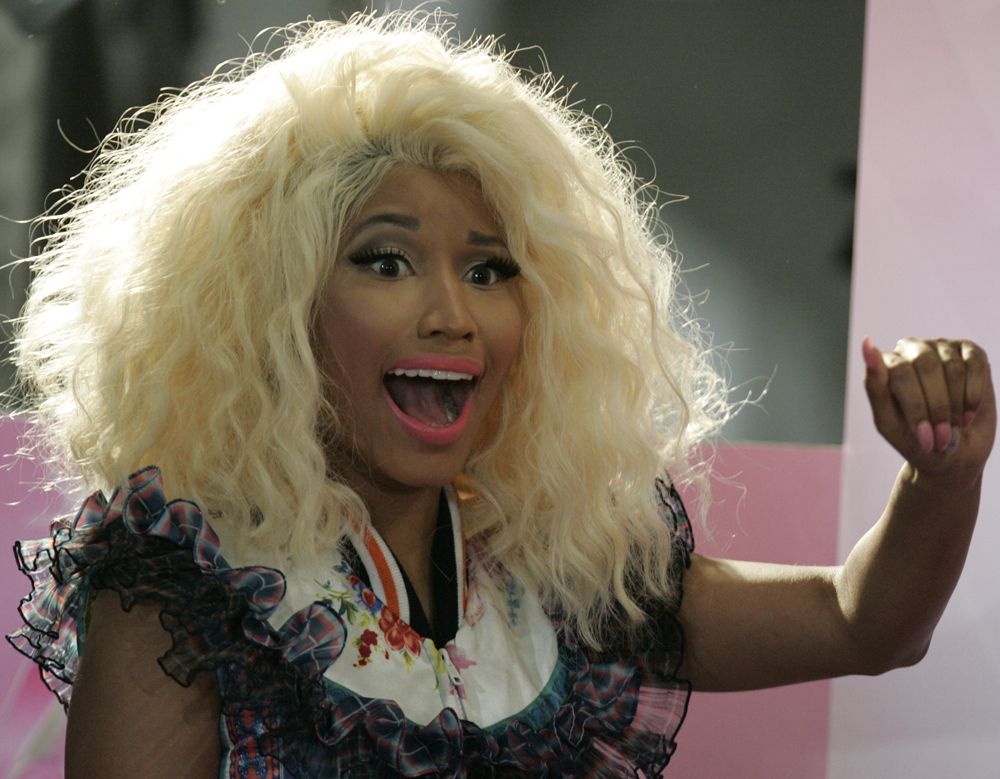
Nicki Minaj featured on the single soon after Ciara featured on Minaj's song "I'm Legit".

Analy Dewa from Metacritic praised "I'm Out" for representing "her ghetto origins", whilst The Observer from metric called the song "indomitable" and felt that "I'm Out" "powers this album". Mikael Wood of the Los Angeles Times found "I'm Out" to be a particular highlight compared to the other songs from the album, saying the rest of the album had a mellow sound compared to those tracks; he ultimately praised Ciara for not playing it safe, however, seeing her adventurous with both lyrics and production. Allmusic rated the song four out of five stars. The Boston Globe's Ken Capobianco called the single an "essential", continuing to call the song the "best cut", adding Ciara "proves CiCi can be defiant and strong."

== Chart performance ==
On the chart issue dated July 20, 2013, "I'm Out" debuted on the US Billboard Hot 100 at number 50, the top new entry of the week. It eventually moved 6 spots to its peak at number 44. The song also debuted at number 16 on the US Hot R&B/Hip-Hop Songs chart. The single was certified gold by the Recording Industry Association of America (RIAA) for sales of over 500,000 digital copies in the United States.

In the United Kingdom, the single debuted at number 54 on the UK Singles Chart. The song also charted at number 12 on the UK R&B Chart.

== Music video ==
Nicki Minaj revealed via her official Twitter account that Ciara and Minaj had begun filming the video and it would be directed by Hannah Lux Davis. Minaj continued to reveal that "the tone of the video will be very edgy, sexy and playful". The music video was filmed from June 1 and June 2, 2013, in New York. On June 25, 2013, Ciara played a preview of the song's video on Access Hollywood Live. The video premiered on June 30, 2013, at the BET Awards red carpet.

The music video begins with Ciara singing the song, showing only her red lips moving and a grill. Then Ciara and Minaj, sporting all white ensembles in an all-white room, perform synchronized dance moves. The scenes are split up with images of Ciara wearing a grill. The following scene sees Ciara long with back up dancers "channeling vintage Marilyn in white with blonde waves" this is followed by Ciara and dancers in the club. The video then moves to Ciara under a fountain "drenched" before returning to the original scene of her and Minaj twerking and doing other sensual moves together.

== Live performances ==
Ciara first performed the song during her mini-concert at Jimmy Kimmel Live!. She performed the song as part of her setlist at L.A Gay Pride and her show at Musicalize on London O2 Arena. Ciara performed the song at the BET Awards on June 30, 2013, alongside Nicki Minaj. On July 9, 2013, Ciara performed the song on Good Morning America. Later that day, she performed the song on BET's 106 & Park, continuing her week-long takeover.

== Credits and personnel ==
Recording

- Paramount Studios (California)
- Glenwood Studios (Los Angeles)

Personnel

- Writer - Rock City, Onika Maraj, Ciara
- Producer - The Co-Captains, Rock City

== Charts ==
=== Weekly charts ===
Chart (2013)	Peak position
Australia (ARIA)	41
Australia Urban (ARIA)	7
Belgium (Ultratip Bubbling Under Flanders)	31
Belgium (Ultratip Bubbling Under Wallonia)	39
Canada Hot 100 (Billboard)	86
France (SNEP)	159
Hungary (Single Top 40)	8
Scottish Singles Sales (Official Charts)	61
UK Singles (Official Charts)	54
UK Hip Hop/R&B (Official Charts)	12
US Billboard Hot 100	44
US Hot R&B/Hip-Hop Songs (Billboard)	13

=== Year-end charts ===
Chart (2013)	Position
US Hot R&B/Hip-Hop Songs (Billboard)	98

== Certifications ==
Region	Certification	Certified units/sales
United States (RIAA)	Gold	500,000^{‡}
^{‡} Sales+streaming figures based on certification alone.

== Radio adds ==
Region	Date	Format	Label
United States	June 3, 2013	Urban mainstream radio	Epic Records
