= Sorry (Ciara song) =

2012 song by Ciara

Single by Ciara
- Released: September 25, 2012
- Recorded: 2012
- Genre: R&B
- Length: 4:49
- Label: Epic
- Songwriters: Ciara Harris; Elvis Williams; Jasper Cameron
- Producers: Ciara Harris; Jasper Cameron

Ciara singles chronology
"Gimmie Dat" (2010)	"Sorry" (2012)	"Got Me Good" (2012)

Music video
- "Sorry" on YouTube

"Sorry" is a song recorded by American singer Ciara. It was written by Ciara, Elvis "Blac" Williams, and Jasper Cameron, and produced by Harris and Cameron. The song premiered alongside its music video on September 13, 2012, and was released as a digital download two weeks later on September 25, 2012. Epic Records serviced the single to urban contemporary and rhythmic radio in the United States on October 9, 2012. "Sorry" is a midtemp R&B ballad with production akin to Ciara's previous single, "Promise" (2006). Lyrically, the song speaks on a relationship gone bad, and has been described as an autobiography.

"Sorry" received mixed reviews from music critics, some of whom praised its lyricism and vocals and saw it as Ciara's return to her best sound, while other's criticized it for sounding "watered-down" and felt it didn't live up to the standard set forth by Ciara's past hits. The single was moderately successful, as it managed to chart within the top fifty on the US and UK R&B charts and reached the top ten on the US dance chart, making it her first single to do so.

The song's accompanying music video, directed by Christopher Sims, was filmed in Malibu, California and features Ciara demonstrating distance between herself and on-screen lover, model Broderick Hunter, while dancing in solo scenes. Ciara performed the song on BET's Black Girls Rock! awards and on Jimmy Kimmel Live! in the United States. On December 3, 2012, Ciara's boyfriend, rapper Future, released an official remix for the song featuring new production, new vocals, and verses. Ciara's new hair color and stylist created by celebrity hairstylist MateoJon.

== Background and release ==
I feel like I’ve evolved as a woman, and you get to feel that on the song. I literally had to stop myself from crying when I was writing it. You can kinda hear it on the song. I wanted to just go and vent and be free in my music. It’s my way of saying something that I’ve wanted to say to someone for a long time. It’s very real to my heart. I think it’s really cool to embrace the pain of something that may have hurt you and be able to express it through music.

— Ciara on writing "Sorry."

"Sorry" was written by Ciara, who was credited to her full birth name Ciara Princess Harris, Elvis Williams, and Jasper Cameron, and was produced by Harris and Cameron at Royaly Rightings and Universal Music Corporation in Santa Monica, California. The three had previously worked together on Ciara's singles, "Promise" (2006) and "Never Ever" (2009). On August 25, 2012, while speaking to Claudia Jordan on Centric's The Hot 10, Ciara described "Sorry" as a "very, very real record," and went on to tell Essence magazine that she had to stop herself from crying while writing the song. Although Ciara never confirmed who the song was about, she assured it wasn't about ex-boyfriend Amar'e Stoudemire. It was later confirmed that the song was indeed referring to her bad break-up with rapper 50 Cent, and then followed an apology dedicated to Ciara via Twitter from himself.

Ciara first premiered "Sorry" at listening party for One Woman Army in New York, New York on June 6, 2012, with it being one of the records that was highlighted by listeners. On August 13, 2012, Ciara posted a letter online via Instagram, which featured some of the lyrics from the song, and ended with "Sorry 8/20", and premiered the song's single cover on August 20, 2012. Ciara's label, Epic Records went on to confirm that it would serve as the lead single from One Woman Army on September 10, 2012, with it replacing "Sweat", which had originally been confirmed for the position. In speaking on "Sorry"'s release, Ciara stated that she viewed it and its follow-up "Got Me Good" as the album's dual lead singles, stating "Those two just make a cool marriage. ‘Got Me Good’ is living in the moment of being ‘Got Good’. Like when someone makes you feel real good and no one can make you feel like they feel. So it's ‘you got me good’, then it's ‘you had me good’ and then it got to the point where a ‘Sorry’ was necessary." The single premiered on Vevo, alongside its music video, on September 13, 2012. "Sorry" was released via digital download in North America, Australia, and in select European countries on September 25, 2012, and impacted US Urban contemporary and Rhythmic radio stations on October 9, 2012. The single was released in the United Kingdom on December 2, 2012.

== Composition and critical reception ==
"Sorry" is an R&B ballad with a four minutes and forty nine seconds length. The song was co-written by Ciara, Elvis Williams, and Jasper Cameron and produced by Ciara and Cameron. The song samples Ginuwine's song Differences, and a melody similar to that of "Promise". Lyrically the song speaks on a relationship gone sour, being described by MTV as an autobiography.

Pop Crush stated that :Ciara is back in a big way.: Idolator compared the song to past songs by Ciara saying "It has a similar vibe to her past slow burners, like 'Never Ever' and 'Ride'".

== Chart performance ==
In the United States, "Sorry" debuted on the Billboard R&B/Hip-Hop Songs chart at ninety-six on September 27, 2012, and rose to seventy-five the following week. On October 11, 2012, Billboard introduced new chart methodology, which converted the 100 position airplay based- R&B/Hip-Hop Songs chart, into one that takes into account digital sales, airplay, and online streaming in urban markets and has 50 positions. As a result, "Sorry" fell off the chart after only two weeks. It re-entered the chart at forty-nine on October 18, 2012, and peaked at forty-two. With the change, Billboard also introduced the R&B Songs chart, which combines the airplay, sales, and streams of solely R&B (non-rap) songs. Upon its introduction on October 11, 2012, "Sorry" entered the chart at twenty, and peaked at number 14 on the chart. Following its digital release, the song entered the Billboard Hot Digital Songs chart at number 69, prompting it to chart at number 22 on the Billboard Bubbling Under Hot 100 Singles chart on October 4, 2012, a listing of the top 25 songs that have yet to enter the Billboard Hot 100, but fell off the chart the following week. On the Billboard chart dated February 16, 2013, the song reached number 6 of the Hot Dance/Club Songs chart, making it her first song to accomplish that on the chart.

== Promotion ==
=== Music video ===
The music video, directed by Christopher Sims, was filmed in August 2012 in Malibu, California. On August 31, 2012, Ciara revealed a still photograph from the video shoot. On September 11, 2012, more stills from the video were released. The following day, on September 12, a 30-second sneak peek of the cinematic video was released. Later that day, Ciara revealed another 30 second sneak peek of the video. Even later that day, a third preview was shown on BET's 106 & Park. The video premiered on September 13, 2012, on 106 & Park and VEVO. On the video, Complex said, It's a “really dope video” while MTV commented that Ciara brings it with “the perfect blend of sexy and apologetic.”.

=== Live performances ===
On October 13, 2012, Ciara performed "Sorry" and "1, 2 Step" with rapper Missy Elliott at the Black Girls Rock! Awards. The show aired on BET on November 4, 2012. Ciara performed "Sorry" and "Got Me Good", as well as past hits, "Goodies", "1, 2 Step", and "Like a Boy", on Jimmy Kimmel Live! on her birthday, October 25, 2012.

== Remixes ==
On November 27, 2012, it was revealed that Epic Records had commissioned a number of official remixes for "Sorry" by Jasper Cameron (who produced the original version), Kenneth "Soundz" Coby and Watch the Duck. That same day, the first remix titled "Sorry (Remix, Pt. 2)" was premiered online via Rap-Up.com. The new version features an alternative musical production courtesy of Cameron and Sean "JumpStupid" Notty, along with new vocals from Ciara and new verses from her label mate, American rapper Future. The collaboration came about after Ciara featured on a remix of Future's 2012 single "Turn on the Lights". "Sorry (Remix, Pt. 2)" was released digitally on December 3, 2012.

== Track listing ==
- Digital download
1. "Sorry" – 4:49
- Digital Download – Remix Single
1. "Sorry (Remix, Pt. 2)" (featuring Future) – 3:37

== Charts ==
Chart (2012–13)	Peak position
UK Singles (OCC)	173
UK R&B (OCC)	21
US Bubbling Under Hot 100 (Billboard)	22
US Hot Dance Club Songs (Billboard)	6
US Hot R&B/Hip-Hop Songs (Billboard)	42

== Radio and release history ==
Country	Date	Format	Version	Label
Australia	September 25, 2012	Digital download	Main single – "Sorry"	Sony Music
Canada	September 25, 2012	Digital download	Main single – "Sorry"	Sony Music
France	September 25, 2012	Digital download	Main single – "Sorry"	Sony Music
Italy	September 25, 2012	Digital download	Main single – "Sorry"	Sony Music
United States	September 25, 2012	Digital download	Main single – "Sorry"	Epic Records
Switzerland	September 29, 2012	Digital download	Main single – "Sorry"	Sony Music
United States	October 9, 2012	Rhythmic radio	Main single – "Sorry"	Epic Records
United Kingdom	December 2, 2012	Digital download	Main single – "Sorry"	Epic Records
United States	December 3, 2012	Digital download	Remix – "Sorry (Remix, Pt.2)"	Epic Records
United Kingdom	December 16, 2012	Digital download	Remix – "Sorry (Remix, Pt.2)"	Epic Records
Switzerland	December 21, 2012	Digital download	Remix – "Sorry (Remix, Pt.2)"	Sony Music
