= Playlist: the Very Best of Ciara =

Greatest hits album by Ciara
- Released: May 29, 2012
- Recorded: 2003–2010
- Genre: R&B
- Length: 59:14
- Label: Legacy

Ciara chronology
Basic Instinct (2010)	Playlist: the Very Best of Ciara (2012)	Ciara (2013)

Playlist: the Very Best of Ciara is the first compilation album by American recording artist, Ciara, released on May 29, 2012 through Legacy Recordings as part of the Playlist music series. The album includes singles, remixes, and album cuts from Ciara's time with LaFace Records, in which she released her first four studio albums.

== Critical reception ==
Professional ratings
Review scores
Source	Rating
Allmusic	3.5/5 stars

Allmusic reviewer, Andy Kellman, praised Ciara's artistry but criticized the label's choice of songs. Kellman stated, "Each release in the Playlist series tends to be pitched somewhere between a proper overview and a rarities collection. The approach can be aggravating to both casual and loyal fans of a given artist. Sure enough, this is the case with Ciara's Playlist, which covers 2004's Goodies through 2010's Basic Instinct. During this period, Ciara delivered nine singles to the Top Ten of Billboard's R&B/Hip-Hop chart. Only five of them are here; "Oh," "Get Up," and "Ride" are missing, while "Like a Boy" appears in the form of a Jonathan Peters dancefloor remix. This leaves plenty of room for other material, from "Speechless" (an excellent single that flopped) to "The Title" (a solid, L.T.D.-sampling album cut) to the "slow bass remix" of "Gimme Dat" (which easily trumps the original mix). The singer's catalog deserves better than this."

== Track listing ==
No.	Title	Writer(s)	Producer(s)	Length
1.	"Speechless"	Ciara Harris, Terius Nash, Christopher Stewart	The-Dream, Tricky Stewart	4:08
2.	"Gimmie Dat" (Slow Bass Remix)	Kenneth Coby, Harris, Stewart	Soundz, Tricky Stewart	3:52
3.	"Love Sex Magic" (Sex Club Radio Mix) (featuring Justin Timberlake)	Mike Elizondo, James Fauntleroy II, Robin Tadross, Justin Timberlake	Jason Nevins	3:28
4.	"Can't Leave 'em Alone" (featuring 50 Cent)	LaShawn Daniels, Harris, Rodney Jerkins, Curtis Jackson	Darkchild	4:04
5.	"Keep Dancin' on Me"	Nash, Stewart	The-Dream, Tricky Stewart	3:32
6.	"Work" (featuring Missy Elliott)	Marcella Araica, Harris, Nathaniel Hills, Melissa Elliott	Danja	4:05
7.	"Never Ever" (featuring Young Jeezy)	Harris, Jamal Jones, Elvis Williams, Ester Dean, Jay Jenkins, Kenneth Gamble, Keri Hilson, Leon Huff	Polow da Don, Blac Elvis	4:32
8.	"1, 2 Step" (featuring Missy Elliott)	Harris, Phalon Alexander, Elliott	Jazze Pha	3:22
9.	"Promise"	Harris, Jasper Cameron, Jones, Williams	Polow da Don	4:27
10.	"Goodies" (featuring Petey Pablo)	Harris, Jonathan Smith, Sean Garrett, Craig Love, LeMarquis Jefferson	Lil Jon	3:43
11.	"The Title"	Harris, Cameron, Skip Scarborough	Jasper Cameron	4:20
12.	"Turn It Up" (featuring Usher)	Harris, Dean, Usher Raymond, Tyler Williams, H. Humphrey	T-Minus	3:08
13.	"That's Right" (featuring Lil Jon)	Harris, Smith, Jefferson, Candice Nelson, Balewa Muhammad, Cameron	Lil Jon	4:15
14.	"Like a Boy" (Jonathan Peters Deeper Mix 1 Club)	Harris, Nelson, Muhammad, Hilson, Ezekiel Lewis, Calvin Kenon	Jonathan Peters	8:18
Total length:				59:14

== Release history ==
Region	Date	Label
United States	May 29, 2012	Legacy Recordings
