= Basic Instinct (album) =

Studio album by Ciara
- Released: December 10, 2010
- Recorded: 2009–2010
- Genre: R&B
- Length: 43:39
- Labels: LaFace; Jive; Sony Music
- Producers: C. "Tricky" Stewart; Terius "The-Dream" Nash; The Agency; T-Minus; Soundz; Infinity

Ciara chronology
Fantasy Ride (2009)	Basic Instinct (2010)	Playlist: the Very Best of Ciara (2012)

Singles from Basic Instinct
- 1. "Ride" Released: April 23, 2010; 2. "Speechless" Released: September 7, 2010; 3. "Gimmie Dat" Released: October 15, 2010

Basic Instinct is the fourth studio album by American singer Ciara. It was released on December 10, 2010, by LaFace Records and Jive Records. Executive-produced by A&R agent Mark Pitts, Ciara, Tricky Stewart and The-Dream, Basic Instinct returns Ciara to her urban roots with mid-tempo R&B cuts and bass-heavy pop and dance songs. Aside from production by Stewart and The-Dream, Ciara collaborated with production by Soundz, Infinity and T-Minus. Frequent collaborator and friend Ludacris makes a guest vocal appearance, as does labelmate and fellow Atlanta-native, Usher. After her previous album, Fantasy Ride, suffered numerous leaks and pushbacks, information about Basic Instinct was kept confidential until the first single was released and album was complete.

Despite keeping more control of the album's content, Basic Instinct still suffered several pushbacks due to the leaking of songs from the album's recording sessions, much like its predecessor. Three singles preceded the album's release including the Ludacris-assisted lead single "Ride", which peaked within the top five on the US Hot R&B/Hip-Hop Songs chart at number three and at number forty-two on the Billboard Hot 100. The other singles, "Speechless" and "Gimmie Dat", failed to have success like "Ride", and all the singles failed to impact significantly on international single charts. Basic Instinct was well received by critics, on average scoring seventy-two out of 100 according to Metacritic. Most critics praised the eleven-track set for its strong productions and cohesive themes, which drew comparisons to the early career of Janet Jackson.

Basic Instinct debuted on the US Billboard 200 at number forty-four with 37,000 copies sold, becoming the lowest selling debuting album of Ciara's career up to that point and continuing a downward trend in her commercial success. In international territories, the album was also unsuccessful, most notably reaching top-thirty on the Australian Urban Chart and the UK R&B Chart. On February 14, 2011, just two months after the album's release, Ciara published a statement detailing the issues she experienced with Basic Instinct. She detailed how she alone paid over $100,000 for the "Gimmie Dat" music video and how the label refused to promote the singles on US radio stations. Ciara openly criticized her label for the lack of support with Basic Instinct, as well as her previous album, Fantasy Ride, and asked to be released from her contract with LaFace Records (Jive), as a result. Later in March 2025, the album was awarded a Gold certification from the British Phonographic Industry.

== Background and development ==
In September 2009, Tricky Stewart revealed that Ciara had been working on her fourth studio album. At the time the project was set to be produced solely by trio of Tricky Stewart, The-Dream and Ciara herself. Stewart described the studio sessions as "feeling good" with the music "having a good vibe". On the record's theme he said "[Ciara's fourth album] is obviously is gonna have tempo to it, but I think it's gonna have even more substance than the last record. She dances and we always want to bring out what she does that other people don't." Additionally the trio said that they intended the album to contain no features except for one collaboration with The-Dream, although there would be features on remixes. They had wanted to release the album in 2009 but accepted that a 2010 release was more realistic. Later in an interview with Rap-Up magazine, two songs were name dropped, "Speechless" which was the aforementioned feature with The-Dream and "Gifted." Both songs were tipped to appear on the album, though on the final track listing only "Speechless" made the album without The-Dream's vocals. In December 2009, Digital Spy reported that Ciara had begun working Rodney "Darkchild" Jerkins, someone she had previously collaborated with for Fantasy Ride (2009). Milk Recording Studios, in Atlanta, confirmed that Ciara had been recording at their studios with Miles Walker, an engineer who worked on Usher's Raymond v. Raymond and Mary J. Blige's Stronger with Each Tear. He mixed tracks for the album, however none of the tracks he mixed for the record made the final track listing.

In February 2010, in another interview with Rap-Up magazine, it was revealed that due to the legal issues and leaks that plagued Fantasy Ride, news about her fourth studio album was strictly confidential and that no news will be released until they were ready to make an official announcement about the album. Since then, Pharrell Williams revealed, in an interview in Australia, that he had also worked with Ciara for the record along with his production outfit, The Neptunes. When asked what the recording process of her new album was like, Ciara made the following comments to Maxim magazine "It's the coolest, can't lie. I go to the studio at, like, noon, and there's a lot of dancing and, of course, singing. There's a cook who whips up food, and we sit around and joke and record until the wee hours. Then we head home, get up, and do it again. I feel blessed I get to do this for a living."

== Title and concept ==
"Basic Instinct (U Got Me)"
According to Tricky Stewart, on records like "Basic Instinct (U Got Me)" Ciara declares "she's on her grind, coming back, trying to make a better album than she made last time and get back to that mark where everybody knew that she was in the top tier of the female business."

In an interview with 'MaximoTV' on April 12, 2010, Ciara announced that the album would be titled, Basic Instinct. The title was inspired by the 1992 film of the same name, which starred Sharon Stone and Michael Douglas. Stone's character, Catherine Tramell, was a beautiful, seductive, and stealthy crime writer. Ciara told the interviewer "When you get the record, you're gonna get a really fun vibe. You're gonna get an even more sensual side and also confident and cocky. I got like such an attitude on this record, but in such a fun way." One song which follows this theme is "I Run It", Rap-Up described it as a sensual slow jam. The new album is said to sound much like Ciara's debut album, Goodies, and her 2006 single, "Promise", following on from comments made by Tricky Stewart that Ciara was going back to her roots with this album. Meanwhile, she told Pete Lewis of Blues & Soul magazine, that "Basic Instinct is really about her trusting her instinct and going back to the R&B/urban basics in her music – like where she first started, in the days of "Goodies" and "1, 2 Step." In a later interview with Maxim, she said "The album is about our basic wants and desires. But I have to say, Sharon Stone in Basic Instinct was smart, a little shady, and she definitely had a sexy gangsta thing going on."

== Promotion ==
On April 19, 2010 the album's official promotion began with the release of a viral video for the album's title song "Basic Instinct (U Got Me)". The song sees the singer speaking about the return to her R&B/urban roots and ditching the pop sound of previous records. Its music video was directed by Phil the God and features a cameo from The-Dream. On April 20, 2010, the singer revealed a new official website, OnlyCiara to promote the album. She performed singles and previewed tracks from the album at venues in Dallas, Texas and Governor's Island, New York, throughout July and August 2010.". Starting in September 2010, when the album is pre-ordered directly from Sony Music digital release store, "Ride" featuring Ludacris and "Ride (Bei Maejor Remix)" automatically become available as instant downloads. The first five hundred fans to pre-order the album were also given to the chance to receive a Basic Instinct poster signed by Ciara with their album Ciara co-hosted BET's 106 & Park for four days during the week of November 8, 2010. Later that month, Ciara travelled to Australia as one of the line up acts for the Summerbeatz tour, where she performed several of the album's songs as well as songs from her previous albums.

The album's cover was unveiled on July 8, 2010 and met with positive reception. 'Idolator' said "Ciara has been tempting us with her sexy new single 'Ride' ... but if you're looking for her goodies keep on looking because their [sic] not on her Basic Instinct album cover (unless it's a seductive Playboy-esque fold out). The songstress, whose music video proved to be too hot for BET, kept things simple for the cover art." Ciara then outlined plans for a mixtape to precede the album's release, in preparation she recorded remixes to Soulja Boy Tell 'Em's "Pretty Boy Swag" ("Pretty Girl Swag") and Waka Flocka Flame's "Hard in Da Paint", as well as a cover of Young Jeezy's "Lose My Mind". When asked by Gerrick D. Kennedy. from the Los Angeles Times, if the label [ LaFace Records ] had anything to do with the delays in release or late promotion, Ciara replied "I did see a few comments and I said, 'You know what? I one day look forward to being able to share with my fans (things that happen).' Right now, this is about living in a world of possibility and doing my best, .. Getting the record out there, I just want my fans to hear it. This album is really for my fans, and it's good to know the energy and the feedback has been great. It really is just the beginning". In February 2011, following rumors that Ciara had been dropped by Jive Records, Ciara released an official statement to her Facebook page. Amongst her complaints, were a lack of funding and support from the label with regards to promoting Basic Instinct. In addition to disagreeing with the label over single choices, Ciara personally funded the $100,000 video for her third single "Gimmie Dat". "I'm dedicated to my music, performance and to my fans! I've tried to be a team player with the label only to have compromised what I truly believed.. And was not given the right opportunity to promote and inform my fans of the release of this album."

== Singles ==
"Ride", which features Ludacris, was released as the lead single on April 26, 2010. It peaked at forty-two on the US Billboard Hot 100, three on the US Hot R&B/Hip-Hop Songs chart. It became Ciara's twelfth top-ten R&B/Hip-Hop Airplay and R&B/Hip-Hop Songs hit. However it was one of Ciara's least successful singles in the UK, only reaching to top seventy-five. "Ride"'s music video was well received by critics such as Billboard magazine, but aroused controversy due to its sexual dances and outfits, and was banned from BET and UK music channels. The song's Bei Maejor Remix, which features Bei Maejor, Ludacris, and Andre 3000 was released as a digital download on June 29, 2010, and was able to chart at seventy-five in Australia. As of November 1, 2010, "Ride" has sold 680,000 copies in the United States through digital and mobile sales. On September 7, 2010, "Speechless" was released as the album's second single. It peaked at seventy-four on the US Hot R&B/Hip-Hop Songs chart.

"Gimmie Dat" was released as the album's third single on November 2, 2010. It has reached a current peak at sixty-three on the US Hot R&B/Hip-Hop Songs chart. It was released as the second single in international markets on October 15, 2010, with "Speechless" as its B-Side. An extended play, featuring both songs and their music videos, was released to the same markets, excluding Australia, on the same day. "Gimmie Dat" achieved minor success in the UK. "Turn It Up", which features Usher, was supposed to be sent to US radio stations on March 8, 2011; however, as of February 8, 2011 it has been removed for radio add lists. Ciara confirmed the single's cancellation in an interview with Rap-Up magazine. In February 2011, Ciara revealed that the album did not have the support of her record label behind it and hence she requested a release from LaFace Records (Jive), signaling an end to the Basic Instinct era.

== Critical reception ==
Professional ratings
Review scores
Source	Rating
AllMusic	4/5 stars
Entertainment Weekly	B+
The Guardian	4/5 stars
Los Angeles Times	1.5/4 stars
New York Daily News	2/5 stars
Now	2/5 Ns
Slant Magazine	2.5/5 stars
Sydney Morning Herald	3.5/5 stars
USA Today	2/4 stars

Basic Instinct received positive reviews from music critics. At Metacritic, which assigns a normalized rating out of 100 to reviews from mainstream critics, the album received an average score of 72, based on 8 reviews, which indicates "generally favorable reviews". Allmusic writer Andy Kellman gave it 4 out of 5 stars and called it Ciara's "most consistent and unified release [...] one of 2010's finest pop-R&B albums". Entertainment Weekly's Simon Vozick-Levinson gave Basic Instinct a B+ rating and viewed that The-Dream and Tricky Stewart's contributions "play towards Ciara's strengths" due to their "caffeinated synthpop beats and wiggling melodies". Jon Pareles of The New York Times commented that the album "never deviates from an underlying two-bar, three-chord vamp, but its synthetic orchestrations vary unpredictably while Ciara's voice curls around the repeating chords on multiple paths". BBC Online's Matthew Horton called it "one of the best RnB albums of the year [...] vibrant, addictive and sleek, a calling card for modern RnB shorn of filler and gauche imitation", writing that Ciara "really becomes the new Janet Jackson, mixing sugary vocals and tempered aggression and rolling over the beats in time-honoured [Janet] Jackson fashion. Matthew Cole of Slant Magazine called it "a svelte and cohesive collection that serves up one glitzy guilty pleasure after another", stating "It's pretty rare that a singles artist decides, seven years into her career, to make her first concerted effort at an album that works as a front-to-back listen."

However, Los Angeles Times writer Randall Roberts found that "the lyrics don't matter" and wrote that the album "offers enough android booty bass action to satisfy those who like their rhythms complicated but repetitive and hooks foreseeable from a mile away, but pleasant enough when they arrive". USA Today's Jerry Shriver gave it 2 out of 4 stars and viewed The-Dream and Tricky Stewart's production as "sometimes incompatible with their client's soft, breathy (and pleasant) pop voice". New York Daily News writer Jim Farber criticized the album's producers, writing that the production resulted in Ciara's soft "R&B vocals turned to mush on badly produced album". Ken Copabianco of The Boston Globe described it as a "safe, rote effort" and stated "Some songs are tart and have attitude but many are nondescript. The emotionally demanding cuts lack conviction". Allison Stewart of The Washington Post wrote that "she hasn't the gravity to carry off lesser songs" and called the album "a personalized mea culpa that's meant to make it okay to like Ciara again, a feat that remains beyond her limited powers of persuasion". MTV UK's Joseph Patterson criticized some of its sexual themes, but described the album "as a credible comeback from a classy lady who it seems is having a bit of an identity crisis", concluding that "With it, Ciara has shown just enough that she knows how to stay current without forgetting her roots, only it comes a little late".

== Commercial performance ==
Basic Instinct debuted at number forty-four on the US Billboard 200 chart, with first-week sales of 37,000 copies. Consequently, it marks the first time in Ciara's career that one of her albums has missed the top ten, as well as continuing a downward trend in success. Her second album, Ciara: The Evolution (2006), topped the Billboard 200 while her debut, Goodies (2004), and previous album, Fantasy Ride (2009), charted at number three. On the US R&B/Hip-Hop Albums chart, Basic Instinct opened at number eleven, again becoming Ciara's lowest charting album of her career up to that point. Her first two albums topped the charts while Fantasy Ride peaked at number two.

When asked about chart performance on the eve of the release of Basic Instinct, Ciara told Gerrick D. Kennedy from the Los Angeles Times:

"When you think about first week [sales] and performance, you don't really think about that because I'm in this for the long run, ... I'm in this to build a brand, I'm in this to one day hopefully be known as a solid touring act. That's the ultimate goal, and there are so many other factors that you have to put into play when it comes to being an artist. And it allows me to be in a positive place."

In the following weeks, Basic Instinct continued to tumble down the charts. In week two it registered the eighth biggest fall on the Billboard 200, dropping fifty places to number ninety-four. On the Top R&B/Hip-Hop Albums chart is registered the seventh largest fall of the week, only falling eleven places to number twenty-two. In February 2011, online rumors were circulated that Ciara had been dropped from Jive Records due to the album's lack of commercial success. In an official statement, Ciara revealed that she never had the support of her label on the album. Aside from funding one of the album's music videos, and paying for the radio release of "Gimmie Dat", she revealed that the label no longer saw her as commercially viable. Consequently due to Basic Instinct's performance, Ciara has officially asked to be released from her recording contract. The album has sold 116,000 copies in the US as of July 2013, meaning at the time, it was Ciara's lowest selling album.

In the United Kingdom, it was Ciara's lowest charting album having missed the Top 100 on the UK Albums Chart, in comparison to her previous albums which all reached at least the top thirty. It did, however, debut at number thirty on the R&B Albums Chart. It was sleeper hit, eventually receiving a Silver certification from the British Phonographic Industry on May 6, 2022, for sales and streams in excess of 60,000 copies, becoming her third album to reach the milestone after Goodies (2004) and Ciara: The Evolution (2006). It was certified Gold in March 2025, becoming her second album to achieve the milestone after Goodies.

Basic Instinct made its Swiss Chart debut at number eighty-three, making it Ciara's lowest charting album in Switzerland since her debut, Goodies, which reached number fifty-two back in 2004. In Australia, it reached number twenty-two on the ARIA Urban Chart. In France, it debuted at number forty-six on the French Digital Albums Chart, where it remained for one week before falling off the chart.

== Track listing ==
Basic Instinct – Standard version
No.	Title	Writer(s)	Producer(s)	Length
1.	"Basic Instinct (U Got Me)"	Ciara Harris; Terius "The-Dream" Nash; C. "Tricky" Stewart	Stewart; Nash; Kuk Harrell^{[a]}	3:29
2.	"Ride" (featuring Ludacris)	Harris; Nash; Stewart; Christopher Bridges	Stewart; Nash; Harrell^{[a]}	5:27
3.	"Gimmie Dat"	Harris; Stewart; Kenneth Coby	Stewart; Soundz; Harrell^{[a]}	4:11
4.	"Heavy Rotation"	Harris; Coby; Mike Molina; Nelson Kyle; Rogers Andrell; Brian Flemming; Gerald J Coats	The Agency; Soundz^{[b]}; Harrell^{[a]}	4:08
5.	"Girls Get Your Money"	Harris; Nash; Stewart	Stewart; Nash; Harrell^{[a]}	3:32
6.	"Yeah I Know"	Harris; Coby; Jordan Suecof	Infinity; Harrell^{[a]}	3:44
7.	"Speechless"	Harris; Nash; Stewart	Stewart; Nash; Harrell^{[a]}	4:08
8.	"You Can Get It"	Harris; Nash; Stewart	Stewart; Nash; Harrell^{[a]}	4:00
9.	"Turn It Up" (featuring Usher)	Harris; Ester Dean; Usher Raymond; Tyler "T-Minus" Williams; H. Humphrey	Stewart; T-Minus; Harrell^{[a]}	3:08
10.	"Wants for Dinner"	Harris; Nash; Stewart	Stewart; Nash; Harrell^{[a]}	3:31
11.	"I Run It"	Harris; Nash; Stewart	Stewart; Nash; Harrell^{[a]}	5:15

Basic Instinct – iTunes Store pre-order bonus track
No.	Title	Writer(s)	Producer(s)	Length
12.	"Listen to My Song"	Harris; Nash; Stewart	Stewart; Nash; Harrell^{[a]}	5:22

Basic Instinct – Japanese edition bonus track
No.	Title	Writer(s)	Producer(s)	Length
12.	"This Is What Love Is"	Harris; Nash; Stewart	Stewart; Nash; Harrell^{[a]}	4:21

Basic Instinct – Japanese edition bonus DVD and iTunes deluxe edition bonus videos
No.	Title	Director	Length
1.	"Goodies" (featuring Petey Pablo)	Benny Boom	3:56
2.	"1, 2 Step" (featuring Missy Elliott)	Boom	3:24
3.	"Get Up" (featuring Chamillionaire)	Joseph Kahn	4:59
4.	"Promise"	Diane Martel	4:28
5.	"Like a Boy"	Martel	3:57
6.	"Can't Leave 'em Alone" (featuring 50 Cent)	Fat Cats	4:09
7.	"Never Ever" (featuring Young Jeezy)	Chris Robinson	5:10
8.	"Go Girl" (featuring T-Pain)	Melina	4:04
9.	"Love Sex Magic" (featuring Justin Timberlake)	Martel	3:04
10.	"Ride" (featuring Ludacris)	Martel	4:39

Notes

- Track listing and credits taken from album booklet.
- ^{^a} denotes a vocal producer
- ^{^b} denotes a co-producer
- "Basic Instinct (U Got Me)" samples "Eye of the Tiger" by Survivor.
- "Heavy Rotation" contains a portion of "Baby Baby" written by Rogers Andrell, Brian Flemming and Gerald J. Coats.

== Personnel ==
Credits for Basic Instinct adapted from AllMusic.

- The Agency – producer
- Alex Al – bass
- Chris Bellman – mastering
- Ciara Harris – executive producer, vocals
- Martin Cooke – assistant engineer
- Steven Dennis – assistant engineer, mixing assistant
- Lauren Evans – background vocals
- Iain Findlay – assistant engineer
- Yolonda Frederick – make-up
- Chris Galland – assistant engineer
- Jesus Garnica – mixing assistant
- Steven Gomillion – photography
- Josh Goodwin – vocal engineer
- Mark Gray – mixing assistant
- Josh Gudwin – vocal engineer
- Kuk Harrell – vocal engineer, vocal producer
- Travis Harrington – mixing assistant
- Jaycen Joshua – mixing
- Dennis Leupold – photography
- Giancarlo Lino – mixing assistant
- Chris Bellman – audio mastering
- Monte Neuble – keyboards
- Terius "The-Dream" Nash – executive producer, producer
- Luis Navarro – assistant engineer
- Chris "Tek" O'Ryan – engineer
- Mark Pitts – executive producer, A&R
- Zachariah Redding – assistant engineer
- Marni Senofonte – stylist
- Kelly Sheehan – engineer
- Jason Sherwood – assistant engineer
- Kenneth "Soundz" Colby – producer
- Christopher "Tricky" Stewart – executive producer, producer
- Anthony Taglianetti – assistant engineer
- Brian "B-Luv" Thomas – engineer
- Michael Thompson – guitar
- Pat Thrall – engineer, vocal effects
- Randy Urbanski – assistant engineer
- Courtney Walter – art direction, design
- Tyler "T-Minus" Williams – producer
- Kiyah Wright – hair stylist
- Andrew Wuepper – engineer, mixing

== Charts ==
=== Weekly charts ===
Weekly chart performance for Basic Instinct
Chart (2010)	Peak position
Australian Urban Albums (ARIA)	22
French Digital Albums (SNEP)	46
South Korean Albums (Circle)	59
Swiss Albums (Schweizer Hitparade)	83
UK Album Downloads (Official Charts)	61
UK R&B Albums (Official Charts)	30
US Billboard 200	44
US Top R&B/Hip-Hop Albums (Billboard)	11

=== Year-end charts ===
Year-end chart performance for Basic Instinct
Chart (2010)	Position
US Top R&B/Hip-Hop Albums (Billboard)	67

== Certifications ==
Region	Certification	Certified units/sales
United Kingdom (BPI)	Gold	100,000^{‡}
^{‡} Sales+streaming figures based on certification alone.

== Release history ==
List of release dates, showing country, record label, and catalog number
Region	Date	Format	Label	Catalog	Ref(s)
Australia	December 10, 2010	CD, digital download	Sony Music	88697720922	
Germany	December 10, 2010	Digital download, CD	Sony Music	88697720922	
Sweden	December 10, 2010	Digital download, CD	Sony Music	886977209222	
France	December 13, 2010	Digital download, CD	Sony Music	886977209222	
United Kingdom	December 13, 2010	Digital download, CD	RCA Records	88697720922	
United States	December 14, 2010	Digital download, CD	LaFace, Jive Records	886977209222	
Brazil	December 14, 2010	CD	Sony Music	886977209222	
Japan	December 15, 2010	Standard edition (CD)	Sony Music Japan	SICP2848	
Japan	December 15, 2010	Deluxe edition (CD+DVD)	Sony Music Japan	SICP2846	
Netherlands	December 24, 2010	Digital download, CD	Sony Music	88697720922	
