= Ciara: Live in Concert =

2006 concert tour by Ciara

- Continental tour by Ciara
- Location: North America
- Associated album: Ciara: The Evolution
- Start date: October 26, 2006
- End date: December 10, 2006
- No. of shows: 16 in North America

Ciara concert chronology
- Ciara: Live in Concert (2006); Screamfest '07 (2007)

Ciara: Live in Concert was the debut concert tour of American recording artist Ciara. It supported her second studio album, Ciara: The Evolution (2006) and visited venues in the United States and Canada. The 16-city tour began on October 26 and ended on December 10, 2006. Previously unreleased tracks from her then-upcoming second album were previewed during the tour. The singer described the tour as an exclusive event for fans to showcase the album's musical direction. Ciara: Live in Concert was accompanied by various radio concerts and a concert with hip hop group the Black Eyed Peas.

The tour's set list consisted of tracks from Ciara: The Evolution and Ciara's debut studio album Goodies (2004), along with three featured singles. The show held at Nokia Theater in New York City was broadcast live via streaming on AOL Music's website and it was later made available on demand. The tour received mixed to positive reviews; critics were divided regarding the pre-recorded backing tracks and remarked that Ciara was slightly under-prepared to host her own headlining tour, but ultimately praised her energetic choreography.

== Background and development ==
Ciara: Live in Concert was announced by Jive Records on October 10, 2006, via a press release. It was Ciara's first tour as a headliner; she had previously performed as the opening act for Gwen Stefani at the Harajuku Lovers Tour (2005). Ciara: Live in Concert previewed previously unreleased tracks from the singer's then-upcoming second album Ciara: The Evolution (2006). The tour began on October 26, 2006, at the club Love in Washington, D.C. and ended on December 10 at the Nokia Theater in New York City. It was accompanied by several radio concerts and a concert with American hip hop group the Black Eyed Peas in Los Angeles on December 1, 2006, as part of the group's Monkey Business Tour. Regarding the tour, Ciara stated:

Previewing the new record in a small setting gives my fans an exclusive experience where they can truly hear and see exactly where I'm going with Ciara: The Evolution. It's about so much more than just my personal growth — it's about the evolution of music, the evolution of dance, the evolution of fashion. I want to bring a taste of all that to the fans in a one-on-one environment to get them excited for [the album].

== Concert synopsis ==
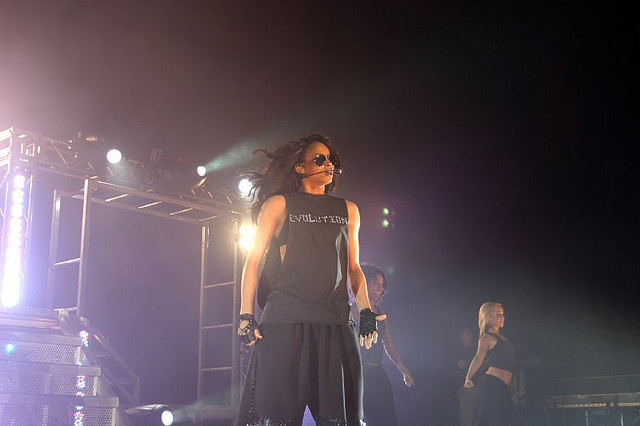
Ciara performing at the House of Blues San Diego

The set list for the tour consisted of songs from Ciara: The Evolution and Goodies. As featured artists did not appear on the tour, their part of the songs were edited out, namely on "Oh" and "That's Right" and the featured singles "Like You" by Bow Wow and "Lose Control" by Missy Elliott. The set decor included risers and multicolored lights. The show began with Ciara appearing on a platform one story above the stage floor. She performed her debut single "Goodies", which was quickly followed by "Oh". She wore tight metallic pants, a cut-up white T-shirt and sunglasses. The tempo of "Make It Last Forever" was increased and the backup dancers performed "old-school" breakdancing. The performance ended with Ciara and her dancers freezing in "Vogue poses".

While performing "Lose Control", Ciara took off her shirt and revealed a silver bra underneath. The male back-up dancers also took their shirts off. Ciara performed her part in Bow Wow's "Like You" while appearing alone on stage. For "Like a Boy", Ciara and her female dancers switched to military-style clothing and performed male-oriented choreography. Later in the show came "Promise", for which Ciara recreated dance moves from the music video while sporting black pants, a jacket and a hoodie. She ended the song by lying face down while pounding on the stage with her fists. She closed the set with "Get Up". No musicians appeared on stage throughout the show and Ciara wore a headset microphone to fully focus on her dance moves. The show lasted 45 minutes.

== Reception and recordings ==
The tour received mixed to positive reviews from critics. The Morning Call's Dalondo Moultrie was positive in his review of the tour and wrote that Ciara "put on one of the best performances I have seen yet at [Crocodile Rock]". Moultrie called her dance steps "incredible", noting that it was in sync with the music, "each pelvic thrust or body-bending twist" and the periodic bursts of light. In conclusion, Moultrie praised the concert and its "high-energy songs, sexy dance moves, flawless vocals and a top-flight light show". Bill White of Seattle Post-Intelligencer wrote that due to Ciara's high energy, "it hardly mattered that she was singing to backing tracks". Regarding the pre-recorded vocals, he said: "Usually this type of performance seems cut-rate and dishonest, but Ciara, with the help of slick lighting and sharp choreography, made it work". White concluded: "It may have been a 45-minute infomercial for her second release, 'Evolution', but Ciara's explosive display of crunk was a minispectacle in its own right." Sia Michel of The New York Times wrote a positive review, stating: "Ciara led a squad of hip-hop dancers through stylishly choreographed routines. Striding about in a headset, she was a commanding and relentlessly professional presence."

Vincent Jackson of The Press of Atlantic City wrote that Ciara "exhibited a great deal of self-confidence during the course of the night". Jackson commented that Ciara is a "limited vocalist", stating that she made a "good decision to put most of her energy into her almost nonstop, aerobic dance performance". Newsday critic Glenn Gamboa was more critical, writing that "Pop concerts require strong personalities and, at 21, Ciara hasn't quite perfected hers yet". Gamboa called the show "as slick as an ice patch and often just as cool", but noted that sometimes she "got dwarfed by her surroundings" of eight dancers and recorded backing vocals. He praised the up-tempo songs and "Promise", but criticized the ballad "I'm Just Me" for "nearly halt[ing]" the set. He ended on a more positive note, writing that "Ciara shows that she is well on her way to becoming a superstar herself". Jon Gilbertson of Milwaukee Journal Sentinel was largely critical of the show and criticized the singer for relying on backing tracks, stating that she failed to stand out as none of the songs "brought forth any recognizable vocal signatures".

AOL Music announced on December 8, 2006, that it would broadcast Ciara's concert at the Nokia Theatre. The concert was available worldwide for free via live streaming on AOL Music's website. When the show had ended, viewers could access it via an on demand service.

== Tour dates ==
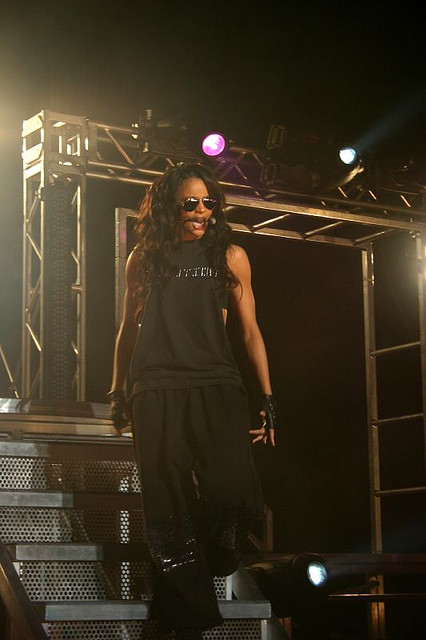
Ciara performing at the House of Blues San Diego

Date	City	Country	Venue
North America
October 26, 2006	Washington, D.C.	United States	Love Nightclub
October 28, 2006	Allentown	United States	Crocodile Rock Cafe
November 1, 2006	Toronto	Canada	The Guvernment
November 3, 2006	Indianapolis	United States	Vogue Nightclub
November 4, 2006	Milwaukee	United States	Rave Hall
November 5, 2006	Chicago	United States	House of Blues
November 7, 2006	Denver	United States	Fillmore Auditorium
November 9, 2006	Park City	United States	Harry O's
November 11, 2006	Claremont	United States	Bridges Auditorium
November 12, 2006	San Diego	United States	House of Blues
November 13, 2006	Anaheim	United States	House of Blues
November 15, 2006	Seattle	United States	Moore Theatre
November 18, 2006	Las Vegas	United States	House of Blues
November 19, 2006	Tempe	United States	Marquee Theatre
December 7, 2006	Atlanta	United States	Center Stage
December 10, 2006	New York City	United States	Nokia Theatre Times Square
