= Ride (Ciara song) =

Single by Ciara featuring Ludacris

from the album Basic Instinct
- B-side: "Ride" (Bei Maejor remix)
- Released: April 23, 2010
- Studio: Boom Boom Room, Burbank; Nash Estate, Atlanta; Triangle Sound, Atlanta
- Genre: R&B; hip-hop
- Length: 4:34 (album version); 5:26 (single version)
- Label: LaFace
- Songwriters: Ciara; Terius "The-Dream" Nash; C. "Tricky Stewart"; Christopher Bridges
- Producers: Tricky Stewart; The-Dream

Ciara singles chronology
"Work" (2009)	"Ride" (2010)	"Speechless" (2010)

Ludacris singles chronology
"My Chick Bad" (2010)	"Ride" (2010)	"Beamer, Benz, or Bentley (remix)" (2010)

Music video
- "Ride" on YouTube

"Ride" is a song by American recording artist Ciara. The song features American rapper Ludacris. It was co-written by Ciara, Ludacris, Tricky Stewart, and The-Dream, and produced by the latter two. The song served as the lead single from her fourth studio album, Basic Instinct. The song was first released for digital download on April 23, 2010. "Ride" is a down-tempo R&B song with hip-hop elements, featuring a heavy bass line and seductive tone.

The song received generally positive reviews from critics, complimenting the song's toned-down production. It reached number three on the Hot R&B/Hip-Hop Songs in the United States, becoming Ciara's twelfth top ten hit on the chart. The accompanying music video features sexually charged, provocative choreography, and therefore was not aired on BET, and banned from UK music channels. The official remix features André 3000 and Bei Maejor, in addition to Ludacris.

== Background ==
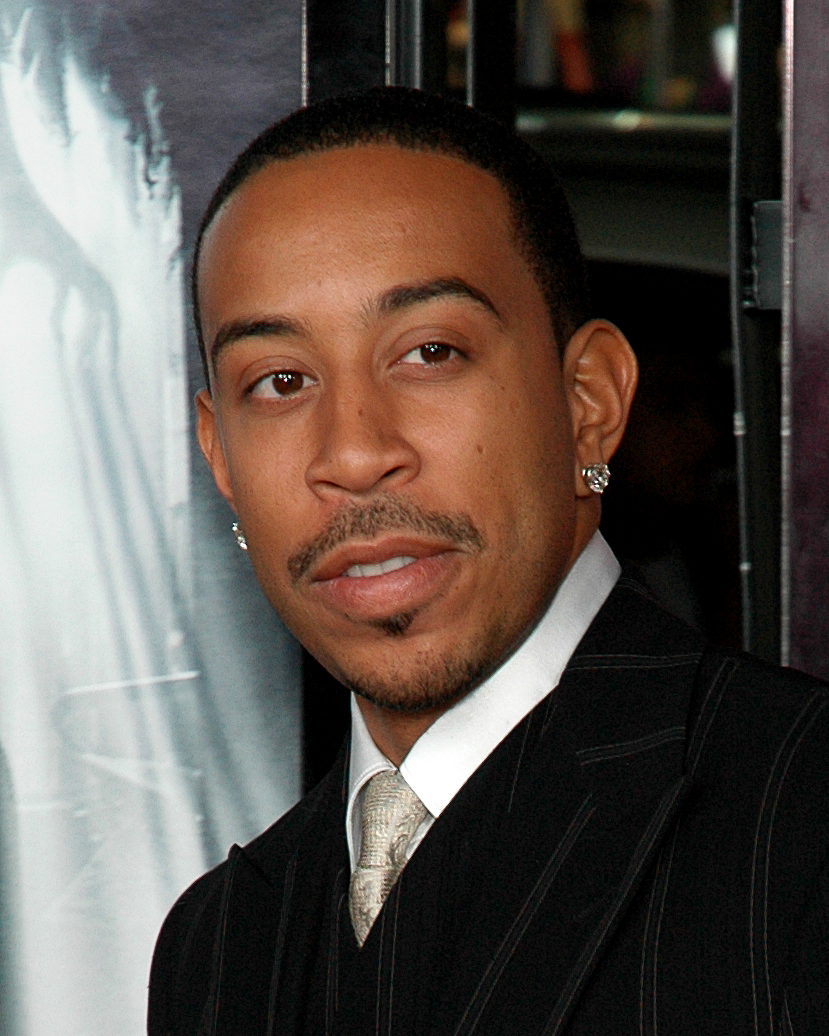
This song marks the fourth time Ciara and Ludacris have collaborated.

Jive Records spoke exclusively to Rap Up magazine on March 29, 2010 to confirm that Ciara would be releasing a new song called "Ride" featuring Ludacris. It is the fourth time that the two artists have collaborated: the first being 2005's "Oh", second being 2009's "High Price" and the third being the 2010 remix to Ludacris' single "How Low".

The song's official remix features Outkast's André 3000, Bei Maejor and Ludacris. Ciara told MTV News that it was "cool" for André 3000 to respond and get on the record, as the rapper is reclusive when he and Outkast are on break, and selective when it comes to features. Ciara said, "My team actually kind of helped put that together. My A&R [rep] Mark [Pitts] and [RCA/Jive Label Group Chairman and CEO] Barry Weiss, they kinda worked it out." Ciara also confirmed she and 3000 were supposed to collaborate before, commenting: "When I was doing [2006's] Evolution, I wanted him to do something with me, and we never got to do anything. It's just really great timing now that we get to do something. My fans are getting an unexpected treat with it. He is, from what I understand, very selective and ... protective of his creativity, so it just feels really good to be able to rock with him." The remix was released on June 29, 2010 as a digital download.

== Composition ==
"Ride"
A sample of "Ride" featuring Ciara singing the "try me...buy me" hook and the chorus.

The song has a slow-tempo and "sensual" feel, backed by a simple bass line and "shimmery" synths, with beats described as "smooth", "heavy" and "dragged out". Ciara's lyrics have been said to be delivered "sultry" and "seductively". Ludacris's flow has been described as "hypnotizing", delivering one of his "trademark rhyme-filled" verses. Although the lyrics are technically referring to how one "rides" the beat to a song, there are subtle clues of sex in the song.

== Critical reception ==
Bill Lamb of About.com said, "with the help of Ludacris on guest rap and Tricky Stewart with The-Dream handling production, a fully adult Ciara is back to the sexiness she seems to do best." Rap-Up commented that Ciara "glides over" the beat and warned listeners to "Hold on tight." BET Sound Off noted while the song was not bad, it lacked personality, and that the Tricky-produced beat did not add excitement to the track. Ed Easton Jr. of WNOW-FM said that the song showed that Ciara and Ludacris continue to show they have chemistry. Idolator commented that the song's "simple bass line and the shimmery synths" create a "powerful, hypnotic track that's going to sound great on the dancefloor", as Ludacris adds a "raunchy", "rapid-fire" verse. The review also said Ciara's longtime collaborators, Tricky Stewart and The-Dream could "put Ciara back on the map with this one."

Andy Kellman of Allmusic and Allison Stewart of The Washington Post both noted "Ride" as a standout track from Basic Instinct. Ken Capobianco of Boston Globe who called the song "a bump-and-grind", noted the song as the essential track from the album. Coining it as "lusty", the song was Simon Vozick-Levinson of Entertainment Weekly's recommended download from the album. "Ride" has since been certified Platinum by the RIAA for units exceeding 1 million.

In August 2014, Pitchfork Magazine listed "Ride" at 142 on its list of The 200 Best Tracks of the Decade So Far (2010-2014).

== Chart performance ==
On the issue dated April 29, 2010, Ride debuted at number 93 on the US Billboard Hot 100. Eventually the single reached it peaked on the chart at number 42. During the week of May 28, 2010, the song was the number one most added song on urban radio. On the issue dated June 26, 2010, the song jumped from 18 to nine on the US Hot R&B/Hip-Hop Songs chart, giving Ciara her twelfth top ten hit on the chart. The song eventually peaked at number three on the chart. According to Nielsen SoundScan, the song has sold 250,000 digital units in the US. On September 6, 2019, the single was certified platinum by the Recording Industry Association of America (RIAA) for sales of over a million digital copies in the United States.

== Music video ==
=== Concept and reception ===
Ciara wearing an Atlanta Braves hat, performing suggestive choreography and wearing a cut-out bodysuit.

Ciara and Ludacris filmed the music video in Los Angeles on March 30, 2010 with Diane Martel who directed the Ciara's music videos for 2006's "Promise" and 2007's "Like a Boy", as well as her 2009 worldwide hit, "Love Sex Magic". The video made its debut on April 21, 2010 on VEVO. The video sees Martel taking a minimalistic approach, highlighting the dance performance of Ciara. Scenes show Ciara performing gymnast exercises, teasing Ludacris, alongside a convertible in a bodysuit and fur coat, and riding a mechanical bull while donning a wet T-shirt. She also wears Atlanta Braves hats in two scenes, one of which she acts as an umpire. She told Blues & Soul magazine:

"Basically it was very important for me to make this video an intimate experience for my fans. Which is why I didn't have smoke and mirrors - you know, it wasn't about a whole lotta production. Which in itself was really fun and very different for me because I'm used to having dancers, or people in general, on-screen with me. Plus we also thought it was important that I dance from top to bottom... and so we just really WENT for it!"

Evan Nabavian of Billboard said "When Kanye West sees Ciara's 'Ride' video, he'll probably save a special place for it next to 'Single Ladies' as one of the best videos of all time. ... Ciara glides, bounces, and gyrates with extreme emphasis on her lady parts. If her pointing over the words, 'Booties look like this size,' doesn't enrapture viewers, then her floor-humping during the line, 'I can do it however you want,' should do the trick. Ciara employs every exaggeratedly sexual dance move in the book ... When Ludacris first appears with Ciara purring in his ear, all he can do is smile." Ed Easton Jr. of WNOW-FM said, "Ciara provides plenty of booty poppin' to keep any guy's attention, as she shows us a wide variety of wardrobe choices that are very "light." BET Sound Off noted while "Oh" and "Promise" had edgy choreography, Ciara "pushes the envelope" in the "Ride" clip. The video was ranked by Rolling Stone as the 14th sexiest music video of all time.

=== Edit and ban controversy ===
BET did not air the video, and did not include it on its signature countdown show, 106 and Park, due to its sexual content. Of the decision to do so, Ciara said "If there's a way to edit a version I would definitely do it, ...My fans have actually given me a lot of support." Several fans noted how MTV and VH1 did not ban the video, and how BET allowed Trey Songz' "Neighbors Know My Name" and "I Invented Sex" in rotation. Later, Ciara reiterated to Rap-Up that she was willing to edit the video, however she did comment that the network did play other sensual videos. She then told MTV News:

"My intention is always to do something as good as I can do it, to give my best effort and I always hope that it comes out the way that I envision it. You never necessarily think, 'Oh, this is gonna get banned'. In my past experiences with BET, in particular, they have asked me maybe to take out a few things, so normally you expect that — not necessarily banned. That was the first time for me and that was definitely something that was unexpected. It's been a real great blessing with the new technology and Internet and all the support I've been getting. It's been working itself out. My fans are still able to see the video."

However, a representative from BET refuted the claims that they originally banned the video, telling MTV News that, "It went through the normal process where we gave edits and we never received a response." Additionally, it was revealed on Ciara's official website in the UK that it was banned from all UK TV channels.

It was rated '12' by the UK's BBFC.

In France, some scenes was blurred in a few channels and the video was broadcast with a warning '-10' on French music channels, because of the sexual content and lascivious poses.

== Track listing ==
- Digital download
1. "Ride" featuring Ludacris - 5:26
- Digital download remix
1. "Ride (Bei Maejor Remix)" (Clean Version) featuring Bei Maejor, Ludacris & André 3000 - 4:40
- Digital single
1. "Ride" featuring Ludacris - 5:26
2. "Ride (Bei Maejor Remix)" featuring André 3000, Ludacris & Bei Maejor - 4:40

== Credits ==
"Ride" was recorded at The Boom Boom Room in Burbank, California, The Nash Estate Atlanta, Georgia and Triangle Sound Studios in Atlanta, Georgia.

- Songwriting - Ciara Harris, Terius "The-Dream" Nash, Christopher "Tricky" Stewart, Christopher "Ludacris" Bridges
- Production - Tricky Stewart, The-Dream
- Vocal production and recording - Kuk Harrell
- Engineer - Brain "B-luv" Thomas, Andrew Wuepper, Kelly Sheehan
- Additional Engineering - Pat Thrall, Chris "Tek" O'ryan
- Assistant Engineer - Luis Navarro, Randy Urbanski, Zachariah Redding, Jason Sherwood, Steve Dennis
- Mixing - Jaycen Joshua
- Mixing Assistants - Giancarlo Lino, Mark Gray
- Lead vocals - Ciara
- Guest vocals - Ludacris
- Background vocals - Lauren Evans

== Charts ==
Chart (2010)	Peak position
Australia (ARIA); Bei Maejor remix	75
Belgium (Ultratip Bubbling Under Flanders)	10
Germany (Deutsche Black Charts)	16
UK Singles (Official Charts)	75
UK Hip Hop/R&B (Official Charts)	27
US Billboard Hot 100	42
US Dance Airplay (Billboard)	22
US Hot R&B/Hip-Hop Songs (Billboard)	3
US Rhythmic Airplay (Billboard)	14

=== Year-end charts ===
Chart (2010)	Position
US Hot R&B/Hip-Hop Songs (Billboard)	27

== Certifications ==
Region	Certification	Certified units/sales
New Zealand (RMNZ)	Gold	15,000^{‡}
United States (RIAA)	Platinum	1,000,000^{‡}
^{‡} Sales+streaming figures based on certification alone.

== Release history and radio dates ==
=== Radio add dates ===
Country	Format	Date
United States	Urban	May 4, 2010
United States	Rhythmic	May 11, 2010

=== Release history ===
Country	Version (via Digital download)	Date	Label
Belgium	Main version	April 26, 2010	Sony Music Entertainment
Canada	Main version	April 26, 2010	Sony Music Entertainment
Denmark	Main version	April 26, 2010	Sony Music Entertainment
Finland	Main version	April 26, 2010	Sony Music Entertainment
France	Main version	April 26, 2010	Sony Music Entertainment
Ireland	Main version	April 26, 2010	Sony Music Entertainment
Italy	Main version	April 26, 2010	Sony Music Entertainment
Luxembourg	Main version	April 26, 2010	Sony Music Entertainment
Netherlands	Main version	April 26, 2010	Sony Music Entertainment
Norway	Main version	April 26, 2010	Sony Music Entertainment
Spain	Main version	April 26, 2010	Sony Music Entertainment
Sweden	Main version	April 26, 2010	Sony Music Entertainment
Switzerland	Main version	April 26, 2010	Sony Music Entertainment
United States	Main version	April 27, 2010	LaFace Records
Germany	Main version	May 21, 2010	Sony Music Entertainment
United States	Remix version	June 29, 2010	LaFace Records
Belgium	Main version, remix version	July 2, 2010	Sony Music Entertainment
United Kingdom	Main version, remix version	July 4, 2010	RCA Records
Australia	Remix version	July 5, 2010	Sony Music Entertainment
Canada	Remix version	July 5, 2010	Sony Music Entertainment
Finland	Remix version	July 5, 2010	Sony Music Entertainment
France	Remix version	July 5, 2010	Sony Music Entertainment
Germany	Remix version	July 30, 2010	Sony Music Entertainment
