= Ciara: The Evolution =

Studio album by Ciara
- Released: December 5, 2006
- Recorded: June – September 2006
- Genres: Hip-hop; crunk; R&B
- Length: 59:26
- Labels: Jive; Music Line; LaFace; Zomba; Sony BMG
- Producers: Ciara; Antwoine Collins; will.i.am; Brian Kennedy; Bryan-Michael Cox; Calvo Da Gr8; Jazze Pha; Kendrick Dean; Dallas Austin; Lil Jon; Mr. Collipark; The Neptunes; Polow da Don; Rodney "Darkchild" Jerkins; The Clutch; R. Kelly

Ciara chronology
| Goodies (2004) | Ciara: The Evolution (2006) | Fantasy Ride (2009) |

Singles from Ciara: The Evolution
- 1. "Get Up" Released: July 25, 2006; 2. "Promise" Released: October 16, 2006; 3. "Like a Boy" Released: February 13, 2007; 4. "Can't Leave 'em Alone" Released: June 12, 2007

Ciara: The Evolution (often simply known as The Evolution) is the second studio album by American singer Ciara, released on December 5, 2006, by Jive Records, Music Line Entertainment and LaFace Records. The album is separated into five sections, with each showcasing a different side of Ciara's artistry. The first features crunk&B and uptempo records, which mainly deal with feminine independence, while its successor, entitled The Evolution of Music features ballads dealing with the positives and struggles of love. The Evolution of Dance features dance tracks, The Evolution of Fashion deals with self-expression, while the last, entitled The Evolution of C, features tracks that discuss how Ciara has evolved as a person since the start of her career.

The album was seen as a coming of age project for the singer, as it featured songs with more substance than her last effort. It deals with Ciara's experiences after being in the public eye for the two years prior to the album's release. The tracks are also said to be geared toward a more urban audience. Ciara was the executive producer of the album and enlisted production from Antwoine Collins, Brian Kennedy, Bryan-Michael Cox, Calvo Da Gr8, Dallas Austin, Jazze Pha, Kendrick Dean, Lil Jon, Mr. Collipark, the Neptunes, Polow da Don, Rodney Jerkins, the Clutch, will.i.am, among others, and featured guest appearances from 50 Cent and Chamillionaire. Ciara also co-wrote and co-produces most of the songs.

The album received mixed to positive reviews from most music critics. Generally, critics praised Ciara's increased vocal ability and the album's lyricism, but criticised its frequent interludes and the latter half of the album. The Evolution became Ciara's first and only number-one album in the US. It was certified platinum by the Recording Industry Association of America (RIAA) within five weeks of its release and has sold 1.3 million copies in the US. It also achieved moderate success in international markets, reaching the top forty in most of the countries it was released in.

The Evolution spawned four commercial singles, including "Get Up", which reached the top ten in the United States and New Zealand. The next single, "Promise", reached number-one on US R&B charts and number eleven on the Billboard Hot 100. The third single, "Like a Boy", peaked within top ten in most of the countries it was released in, and reached the top 20 in the US. The final single, "Can't Leave 'em Alone", achieved moderate success. To promote the album, Ciara embarked on her debut concert tour, The Evolution Tour in October 2006. She was also one of the opening acts for Rihanna's Good Girl Gone Bad Tour the next year.

== Production and development ==
According to Ciara, the album's title is "about so much more than just my personal growth – it's about the evolution of music, the evolution of dance, the evolution of fashion." The source of the album's creativity such as the sound and edge comes from Ciara in general. However, Michael Jackson, Prince, and Madonna were influences on the album. During a MTV News interview at the ASCAP Pop Music Awards, Ciara wanted Ciara: The Evolution to be "Goodies to the 10th power", but she did not want to "stray too far from Goodies" and "rehash the same ideas". Ciara decided to collaborate with up-and-coming producers, such as the Clutch, Calvo Da Gr8, Brian Kennedy, and Antwoine Collins who had not been any artist's album, so she could be "all about that new person and that new energy". All-star producers also produced on Ciara: The Evolution.

Polow da Don produced the single "Promise" and "Bang It Up". In early June 2006, Ciara headed to the recording studio with Sean Garrett (who co-wrote Ciara's debut single "Goodies" and The Evolution's "Bang It Up"). She went on to say that she and Sean fight in the studio, but "it makes a good record". The Neptunes produced "I Proceed" and "I'm Just Me". Bryan Michael Cox produced the emotional R&B ballad "So Hard" and Mr. Collipark produced the bonus track "Love You Better". will.i.am's production included "Get In, Fit In" and "Do It", which samples Salt-N-Pepa's "Push It". Ciara thought the album needed "some kind of flavor" so she brought in 50 Cent for the Rodney Jerkins-produced "Can't Leave 'Em Alone" which was originally called "Dope Boys". Jerkins also produced "Make It Last Forever" which samples Lyn Collins's "Think (About It)" and Rob Base's "It Takes Two". Dallas Austin helped with the inspirational pop ballad "I Found Myself". Ciara returned to the studio with her debut album collaborators Lil Jon and Jazze Pha. Lil Jon produced "That's Right" and "C.R.U.S.H." while Pha produced the album's lead single, "Get Up". Ciara dipped into the production world while recording this album, co-producing three of the album's tracks, "Like a Boy", "My Love", and "Get In, Fit In". Album production wrapped between late-August and mid-September.

== Composition ==
For the album artwork, Ciara included many stylized images. She expresses her "evolution of fashion" strongly through the photography. Andy Kellman of AllMusic said "even the album's sleek cover, somewhere between RoboCop and Pointer Sisters' Break Out, has a devolved look."

Throughout the album, there are several interludes that all start with "the Evolution". Each interlude deals with different things, such as fashion and dance. The songs following the interlude all relate to the interlude. The album's opening track, "That's Right", is before the first interlude, and was produced Lil Jon, who is also featured on it. It is described as an "electrifying album opener". Ciara sings with a "sexy mellow voice with Jon's in your face type rapping." It received positive reviews from music critics. The song was scheduled as the fourth single, but it was cancelled for unknown reasons. A music video was released for the song in late December 2007. The second single "Like a Boy" was well received by critics. It is a female empowerment song, which discusses double standards in society and relationships.

"The Evolution of Music", the third track, is an interlude which Ciara narrates how she wanted to record music for the album that is different from others on the radio. The interludes serve as monologues and a "welcome message to be yourself and be confident". The fourth track, "Promise", was critically acclaimed. The song, described as "Prince-ly ballad" and "sci-fi R&B," became Ciara's first single without a featured act to peak in the Billboard top twenty. "I Proceed" is the fifth track on the album. Many critics compared the song to Janet Jackson in the 1980s and called it a "Missy Elliott-style throwback" jam. The sixth track from the album, "Can't Leave 'Em Alone", received mixed reviews from critics. A negative review called the song "very bad pop-lite" while a positive review published that the song is "simply another Darkchild classic". The J.J. Fad–ness C.R.U.S.H. is the seventh track. It details about a young woman having a high school crush on a guy and she yearns to be his girlfriend. The eighth track, "My Love" was co-produced by Ciara. The song is interpreted to be directed towards Ciara's former boyfriend, Bow Wow. It received favorable reviews from critics.

"Get Up"
A sample of "Get Up," said to be in a "moderate hip-hop groove," reminiscent of "1, 2 Step".

"The Evolution of Dance" is the second interlude and the ninth track on the album. Ciara tells how she started dancing and how she became the dancer that she is. The tenth track, "Make It Last Forever" is a "real cool dance/party cut" that samples Rob Base's "It Takes Two". The crunk–pop "Bang It Up", the eleventh track, received favorable reviews from critics. The song is a mixture of "half-spoken vocal style" and "sweetly, flirtatiously rapping". The album's lead single and twelfth track, "Get Up", was released as the lead single from the film soundtrack Step Up (Original Soundtrack) (2006). The single received mixed reviews from critics and fans, being called a "dead ringer for "1, 2 Step".

"The Evolution of Fashion" is the third interlude and thirteenth track on the album. Ciara gives influential advice about changing a unique fashion style and others will follow the trend. The fourteenth track, "Get In, Fit In", is a 1980s electronica track. The song received mixed reactions. "The Evolution of C" is the fourth and final interlude on the album. Ciara details about how her life has changed within the past two years. The album closes with three ballads, beginning with the sixteenth track, "So Hard". The song received mixed reviews from critics. It has been called a "slog," but it "surpass[es] the aching and breaking moments on the debut". The seventeenth track, "I'm Just Me," had mixed reception. The final track "I Found Myself" is a "quite beautiful and moving epic suite".

== Promotion ==
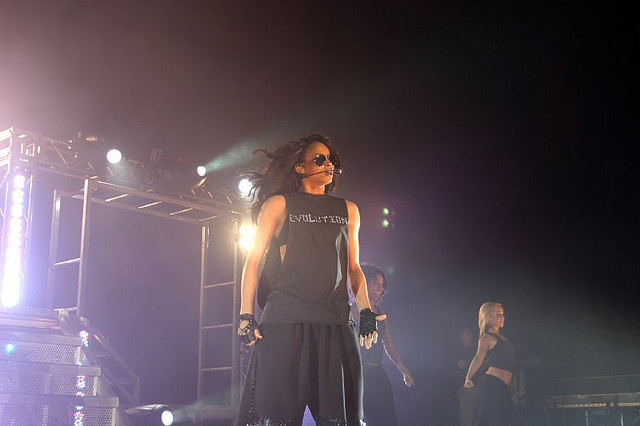
Ciara performing at the House of Blues in San Diego

The singer performed the song "Get Up" on several occasions. She performed the song on the second season finale of So You Think You Can Dance. She later appeared on The Ellen DeGeneres Show to perform the song on December 5, 2006, as well as the 2006 Macy's Thanksgiving Day Parade, the 2006 St. Lucia Jazz Festival, and MTV Goes Gold: New Year's Eve 2007.

On April 3, 2007, Ciara made an appearance on the reality show Dancing with the Stars, where she performed "Like a Boy". She did her famous matrix in a pair of high heels. While the song was at the height of its popularity Ciara's name was featured in a Sprint campaign along with Joss Stone and My Chemical Romance. On June 26, 2007, Ciara performed a medley of "Like a Boy" and "That's Right" at the 2007 BET Awards. Ciara performed "Can't Leave 'em Alone" with 50 Cent at the 2007 World Music Awards on November 24, 2007.

In November 2006, Ciara went on The Evolution Tour. In it she previewed songs from the then-upcoming album, and also performed past hits. The tour went to seventeen clubs in cities throughout the United States. Its last date was aired on BET's Access Granted. In August 2007, she headlined the Screamfest '07 tour with T.I., which went to cities in the United States. Ciara, along with Chris Brown and Akon, were supporting acts for Rihanna's Good Girl Gone Bad Tour in the United Kingdom in December 2007. She performed songs from the album.

=== Singles ===
"Get Up", which features Chamillionaire, was released as the worldwide lead single on July 25, 2006. It was included on the soundtrack to the 2006 dance film, Step Up. The song peaked at seven on the US Billboard Hot 100 and ten on the US Hot R&B/Hip-Hop Songs chart, becoming her seventh top ten hit on the former. It achieved moderate success in international markets, and reached the top five in New Zealand. The second single from the album, "Promise", was released on October 16, 2006, and peaked at eleven on the US Hot 100 and became her third number-one hit on the US Hot R&B/Hip-Hop Songs chart, where it topped the chart for two consecutive weeks. Its official remix, which features R. Kelly was released via digital download on February 13, 2007.

"Like a Boy" was released as the third single from the album on February 13, 2007. It peaked at nineteen on the US Hot 100 and six on the US Hot R&B/Hip-Hop Songs chart. It reached the top twenty in most of the international markets it was released in and even reached the top ten in Sweden. "Can't Leave 'em Alone", which features 50 Cent, was released as the fourth and final single on June 12, 2007. It peaked at forty on the US Hot 100 and became her tenth top ten-hit on the US Hot R&B/Hip-Hop Songs chart. It achieved moderate success in international markets, and even reached the top five in New Zealand. "That's Right", which features Lil Jon, was planned to be released as the fifth single, but the release failed to materialize. Its music video was still released on December 25, 2007, as a Christmas gift for fans.

== Critical reception ==
Professional ratings
Review scores
| Source | Rating |
|---|---|
| AllMusic | 3/5 stars |
| Blender | 3.5/5 stars |
| Entertainment Weekly | B+ |
| The Guardian | 3/5 stars |
| Pitchfork | 5.9/10 |
| PopMatters | 7/10 stars |
| Rolling Stone | 3/5 stars |
| Slant Magazine | 3/5 stars |
| Stylus | B+ |
| Yahoo! Music UK | 7/10 stars |

Ciara: The Evolution received mixed to positive reviews from most music critics. According to Metacritic, the album holds a score of 65 out of 100, indicating "generally favorable reviews". Christian Hoard of Rolling Stone said that "Ciara's still prone to diva blandness and silly little pop songs...but this time she's more interesting by half." For AllMusic, Andy Kellman wrote that "there are plenty of tracks geared toward letting loose and dancing, and most of them do deliver, even if they don't seem quite as fresh as Ciara's past hits", and Entertainment Weekly called the dance songs "rugged and terrific, but eventually the tempos slow and the album slowly settles."

Billboard, on the other hand, gave a mixed review and said, "Songs such as the Rodney Jerkins-produced "Make It Last Forever" and "Get Up," produced by Jazze Pha and also featured on the film soundtrack to "Step Up," are surefire club hits, although such ballads as "It's Over" tend to fall flat. Nonetheless, "The Evolution" should one, two-step Ciara even closer to superstardom." In his Consumer Guide, Robert Christgau gave the album a one-star honorable mention, stating, "If this hottie next door believes she's moving on up toward 'I'm Just Me' and 'I Found Myself,' I want to know why they're not the singles (yet)"; and picked out two songs from the album: "That's Right" and "Like a Boy". Vibe editor Jason King called the album a "mixed bag" and further wrote: "Ciara may believe that woman-in-the-mirror inspirational filler is the key to longevity, but she's better off looking at her reflection as she perfects her pop-locking."

== Commercial performance ==
Ciara: The Evolution debuted at number one on the US Billboard 200 and US Top R&B/Hip-Hop Albums chart, selling over 338,000 copies in the first week. Five weeks later on January 11, 2007, the album was certified platinum by the Recording Industry Association of America (RIAA) for sales of over a million copies in the United States. By October 2007, the album sold over 2 million copies worldwide. As of June 2010, over 1.3 million copies have been sold in the US.

In Canada, the album debuted at thirty-two on the Canadian Albums Chart and number five on the R&B albums chart. In Australia, Ciara: The Evolution debuted below the Australian Albums Chart at seventy-six. In the UK, the album debuted and peaked in the top twenty at number seventeen on the UK Albums Chart, also the album debuted at number twenty-five peaked at number twenty-one in New Zealand.

== Track listing ==
Ciara: The Evolution track listing
| No. | Title | Writer(s) | Producer(s) | Length |
|---|---|---|---|---|
| 1. | "That's Right" (featuring Lil Jon) | Ciara Harris; Candice Nelson; Balewa Muhammad; Jonathan Smith; LaMarquis Jefferson; Jasper Cameron | Lil Jon; Ciara^{[a]}; Jasper Cameron^{[a]} | 4:16 |
| 2. | "Like a Boy" | Harris; Nelson; Muhammad; Patrick "J. Que" Smith; Ezekiel Lewis; Calvin Kenon | Calvo da Gr8; Ciara^{[b]}; The Clutch^{[b]} | 3:57 |
| 3. | "The Evolution of Music (Interlude)" | | | 0:10 |
| 4. | "Promise" | Harris; Cameron; Jamal Jones; Elvis Williams | Polow da Don; Elvis "Blac Elvis" Williams; Ciara^{[a]}; Cameron^{[a]} | 4:27 |
| 5. | "I Proceed" | Harris; Pharrell Williams | The Neptunes | 4:13 |
| 6. | "Can't Leave 'em Alone" (featuring 50 Cent) | Harris; LaShawn Daniels; Rodney Jerkins; Curtis Jackson | Rodney "Darkchild" Jerkins; Ciara^{[a]}; LaShawn Daniels^{[a]} | 4:04 |
| 7. | "C.R.U.S.H." | Harris; J. Smith; Craig Love; Jefferson; James "L-Roc" Phillips; Adonis Shropshire | Lil Jon | 4:17 |
| 8. | "My Love" | Harris; Nelson; Muhammad; Brian Kennedy; Antwoine Collins | Brian Kennedy; Ciara^{[b]}; Troy NōKa^{[b]} | 4:00 |
| 9. | "The Evolution of Dance (Interlude)" | | | 0:15 |
| 10. | "Make It Last Forever" | Harris; Daniels; Jerkins; James Brown; Robert Ginyard | Jerkins; Ciara^{[a]}; Daniels^{[a]} | 3:33 |
| 11. | "Bang It Up" | Harris; Sean Garrett; Jones; Williams | Polow da Don; Ciara^{[a]}; Williams^{[a]}; Garrett^{[a]} | 3:04 |
| 12. | "Get Up" (featuring Chamillionaire) | Harris; Phalon Alexander; Hakeem Seriki | Jazze Pha | 4:21 |
| 13. | "The Evolution of Fashion (Interlude)" | | | 0:15 |
| 14. | "Get In, Fit In" | Harris; William Adams | will.i.am; Ciara^{[b]} | 4:13 |
| 15. | "The Evolution of C (Interlude)" | | | 0:19 |
| 16. | "So Hard" | Harris; Nelson; Muhammad; Bryan-Michael Cox; Kendrick Dean; T. Clark | Bryan-Michael Cox; Kendrick "Wyldcard" Dean; Nelson^{[a]}; Muhammad^{[a]} | 4:49 |
| 17. | "I'm Just Me" | Harris; P. Williams | The Neptunes | 4:32 |
| 18. | "I Found Myself" | Harris; Dallas Austin | Dallas Austin | 4:32 |

iTunes Store and Japan bonus track
| No. | Title | Writer(s) | Producer(s) | Length |
|---|---|---|---|---|
| 19. | "Love You Better" | J. Cameron; M. Crooms; W. Jones | Mr. Collipark | 4:30 |

United States Target and international bonus track edition
| No. | Title | Writer(s) | Producer(s) | Length |
|---|---|---|---|---|
| 19. | "Addicted" | Harris; Demetrius Spencer; Nelson | French | 3:08 |
| 20. | "Promise" (Go and Get Your Tickets Mix) (featuring R. Kelly) | Harris; Cameron; Jones; E. Williams; Robert Kelly | Polow da Don; Blac Elvis; R. Kelly | 4:59 |

International iTunes Store bonus track
| No. | Title | Writer(s) | Producer(s) | Length |
|---|---|---|---|---|
| 21. | "Do It" (featuring will.i.am) | Harris; Adams; Eugene Pistilli; Hurby Azor; Ray Davies; Walter Murphy | will.i.am; Ciara^{[b]}; The Clutch^{[b]} | 3:50 |

International digital bonus track
| No. | Title | Length |
|---|---|---|
| 21. | "Like a Boy" (Soul Seekerz Remix) | 6:45 |

Overseas digital bonus track
| No. | Title | Length |
|---|---|---|
| 21. | "Like a Boy" (Kardinal Beats Remix) | 3:32 |

CD+DVD edition (DVD)
| No. | Title | Length |
|---|---|---|
| 1. | "Ciara and Dancers Teach Moves from "Get Up"" | 16:06 |
| 2. | "Get Up" (featuring Chamillionaire) | 5:04 |
| 3. | "Ciara and Dancers Teach Moves from "Promise"" | 14:38 |
| 4. | "Promise" | 4:36 |
| 5. | "Behind-the-Scenes of "Promise"" | 4:29 |

Notes

- ^{^a} signifies a vocal producer
- ^{^b} signifies a co-producer

Sample credits

- "That's Right" contains samples from the songs "Fix It in the Mix" and "Jam Box" as performed by Pretty Tony.
- "Make It Last Forever" contains a sample from "Think About It" as written by James Brown and contains a portion of the composition "It Takes Two."
- "Do It" contains a sample from "I Like Funky Music" as performed by Uncle Louie and portions from "Push It" as performed by Salt-N-Pepa.

== Personnel ==
- Ciara Harris – vocals, vocal arrangement (track 1), executive producer
- Phillana Williams – executive producer, management
- Lil Jon – vocals (track 1), keyboards (tracks 1, 7)
- LaMarquis Jefferson – bass guitar (track 1, 7)
- Elvis "Blac Elvis" Williams – keyboards, additional vocals (track 4)
- Rodney Jerkins – instrumentation (tracks 6, 10); additional vocals (track 10)
- LRoc – additional keyboards (tracks 7)
- Craig Love – guitar (track 7)
- Cedric Williams – keyboards (track 12)
- Will.i.am – drum machine, keyboards (track 14)
- Wyldcard – strings, keyboards (track 16)
- Bryan-Michael Cox – keyboards, additional strings, instrumentation (track 16)
- Dallas Austin – keyboards, drums (track 18)
- Tony Reyes – guitar, bass (track 18)
- Cara M. Fears-Peak – choir vocals (track 18)
- Cotrell Qualls – choir vocals (track 18)
- Toni Williams – choir vocals (track 18)
- Tyron James Thornton – choir vocals (track 18)
- Chris Athens – mastering (at Sterling Sound, NYC)
- David Schmidt – sample clearance
- Kobie "The Quarterback" Brown – sample clearance
- Donato Guadagnoli – sample clearance
- ACourtney Walter – art direction and design
- Photography: Markus Klinko – photography
- Indrani – photography
- John Moore – styling
- Yolonda Frederick – make-up (for Goldfinger Creative)
- Dylan "3-D" Dresdow – mix engineer
- Shirlena Allen – hair (for Dawn To Dusk Agency)

== Charts ==
=== Weekly charts ===
Weekly chart performance for Ciara: The Evolution
| Chart (2006–2007) | Peak position |
|---|---|
| Australian Albums (ARIA) | 76 |
| Australian Urban Albums (ARIA) | 12 |
| Austrian Albums (Ö3 Austria) | 68 |
| Belgian Albums (Ultratop Flanders) | 43 |
| Belgian Albums (Ultratop Wallonia) | 67 |
| Canadian Albums (Nielsen SoundScan) | 32 |
| Canadian R&B Albums (Nielsen Soundscan) | 5 |
| French Albums (SNEP) | 49 |
| German Albums (Offizielle Top 100) | 32 |
| Irish Albums (IRMA) | 29 |
| Japanese Albums (Oricon) | 30 |
| New Zealand Albums (RMNZ) | 21 |
| Scottish Albums (Official Charts) | 37 |
| Swiss Albums (Schweizer Hitparade) | 15 |
| Taiwanese Albums (Five Music) | 2 |
| UK Albums (Official Charts) | 17 |
| UK R&B Albums (Official Charts) | 4 |
| US Billboard 200 | 1 |
| US Top R&B/Hip-Hop Albums (Billboard) | 1 |

=== Year-end charts ===
Year-end chart performance for Ciara: The Evolution
| Chart (2007) | Position |
|---|---|
| Australian Albums (ARIA) | 47 |
| US Billboard 200 | 27 |
| US Top R&B/Hip-Hop Albums (Billboard) | 7 |

== Certifications ==
Certifications for Ciara: The Evolution
| Region | Certification | Certified units/sales |
|---|---|---|
| New Zealand (RMNZ) | Gold | 7,500^{‡} |
| Russia (NFPF) | Gold | 10,000^{*} |
| United Kingdom (BPI) | Silver | 60,000^{^} |
| United States (RIAA) | Platinum | 1,326,000 |
^{*} Sales figures based on certification alone.^{^} Shipments figures based on certification alone.^{‡} Sales+streaming figures based on certification alone.

== Release history ==
Release history for Ciara: The Evolution
| Region | Date | Label |
|---|---|---|
| United States | December 5, 2006 | LaFace |
| Canada | December 5, 2006 | LaFace |
| Japan | December 6, 2006 | LaFace |
| Indonesia | December 20, 2006 | LaFace |
| Greece | February 6, 2007 | LaFace |
| New Zealand | March 25, 2007 | LaFace |
| Italy | April 6, 2007 | LaFace |
| United Kingdom | April 9, 2007 | LaFace |
| Australia | April 13, 2007 | LaFace |
| Germany | April 13, 2007 | LaFace |
| France | April 16, 2007 | LaFace |
| Brazil | May 30, 2008 | LaFace |
