= Gimmie Dat =

Single by Ciara

from the album Basic Instinct
- A-side: "Speechless"
- Released: October 15, 2010
- Studio: Universal City (Burbank); Larrabee Studios (Hollywood)
- Genre: Dance-pop; electro; R&B
- Length: 4:11
- Label: LaFace
- Songwriters: Ciara; C. "Tricky Stewart"; Kenneth "Soundz" Coby
- Producers: Tricky Stewart; Soundz

Ciara singles chronology
"Speechless" (2010)	"Gimmie Dat" (2010)	"Sorry" (2012)

Music video
- "Gimmie Dat" on YouTube

"Gimmie Dat" is a song by American singer-songwriter Ciara. The song was written by Ciara, along with its two producers Christopher "Tricky" Stewart and Kenneth "Soundz" Coby for her fourth studio album, Basic Instinct (2010). "Gimmie Dat" is an uptempo dance song, featuring speedy, kinetic beats and a sensual-breathy tone. The song has been compared to her previous hip hop-flavored dance songs, "Goodies", and "Work", and has also been compared to Missy Elliott's "Work It". "Gimmie Dat" was released as the third single from Basic Instinct on October 15, 2010. In some countries, the song was released alongside "Speechless", as a dual single.

"Gimmie Dat" was well received by music critics, who compliment its uptempo beat. Although the song was well received by critics, it only managed to peak at the lower half of US and UK charts. An official remix of the song, dubbed the "Slow Bass Remix" was released in the United States on December 21, 2010. It was later confirmed that Ciara had paid for the music video, radio play and promotion of the single herself because the label refused to do so. According to Ciara, her record label even told radio stations to stop playing the song. "Gimmie Dat" was Ciara's final single released under LaFace Records, which she had her contract released from due to Basic Instinct's underperforming sales.

== Background ==
In May 2010, on the red carpet for Maxim's annual Hot 100 celebration, Ciara gave hints to Rap-Up about her next single from Basic Instinct, commenting, "Get ready to dance off the freaking roof. Now it's time to go back, it's time to throw on my sneakers, it's time to just really get bossy for a couple of seconds." Rap-Up also reported that the song was produced by Tricky Stewart and The-Dream. The track was leaked online on July 7, 2010, with production credits now being reported as Stewart and Soundz. In August 2010, it was officially announced that "Gimme Dat" will serve as Basic Instinct's dual second single, alongside "Speechless".

It was released from October 15, 2010, as the international second single, and third US single from Basic Instinct. The American release came in November 2010, and was followed swiftly by the release of a remixed versionof the song. On November 30, 2010, the official "Urban Bass Remix" of the song was uploaded to Ciara's official YouTube account. Produced by Soundz, the Urban Bass Remix removes some of the electro-rhythm of the original version and replaces them with synths. Ciara also recorded new vocals for the remix. The remix was officially released for digital downloads as "Gimmie Dat (Slow Bass Remix)" on December 21, 2010. In February 2011, Ciara took to her official Facebook page to address rumors that she had been dropped by Jive Records. In statement, reported by Rap-Up, Ciara denied those rumors but did say that she did not have the full support of her label on the album. She said the release of "Gimmie Dat" went against label wishes and it wasn't the first time that the label and herself had disagreed over singles. "...I even tried to get 'Gimmie Dat' started I spent tens of thousands of my own money only to hear the radio pds tell me my label didn't want the song played. I even spent more than one hundred thousand dollars out of my pocket on the video to bring my vision to it and still no label support."

== Composition ==
"Gimmie Dat"
A sample of "Gimmie Dat", featuring vocals by Ciara.

"Gimmie Dat" is a R&B dance song with a length of four minutes and eleven seconds. The song has been described as a "fast-paced burner" recalling Ciara's hip hop-flavored dance music as in "Goodies" and "1, 2 Step". "Gimme That" is also reminiscent of her song, "Work", and has been compared to Missy Elliott's "Work It". Ciara gives her lines in a sing-speak delivery, presented by her trademark breathy tone. The song is filled with "let's go-type dancefloor declarations", as well as screams and "super-speedy, hyper-kinetic beats." She also states the catchphrases "gimmie that bass" and "bring it back and take it back" multiple times. The "that" described in the song is referring to the bass.

== Critical reception ==
Becky Bain of Idolator called the song "fantastic", stating that "Gimmie That", "has a great beat, isn't filled to the brim with Auto-Tune like most dance tracks circulating today, and makes us want to go clubbing immediately. Ryan Brockington of the New York Post said, "start stretchin', because it looks like the latter part of summer should be full of reason's to give people 'dat.' I guess when is comes to Ciara, there is no time to rest that booty! Or rehab ours." Calling the song an "absolute destroyer", Tamar Antai of MTV Buzzworthy stated, "It's by far the sickest jam of the summer so (no offense, Usher's "OMG"), and an all-out sexy assault on your mind in the same kinda way that Missy Elliott's "Work It" dropped bombs on your brain." While comparing it to what she called Fantasy Ride's best song, "Work", Sonya Eskridge of Sister 2 Sister, said the song was better than the previous and that, "she's returning to the sound that made her famous in the first place, and we love it!" WERQ said, "I was a little worried for Ci Ci, but I think the ATLien is back! I'm feeling this new Ciara, Gimme That! It has that Bmore Club sound to it, so you already know it's a go!" Additionally WHTD said, the track was "pop-pop-popping and is guaranteed to get everyone on the dance floor."

Andy Kellman of Allmusic noted "Gimmie Dat" as a standout track from Basic Instinct Allison Stewart of The Washington Post said the track "offers a throughline to Ciara's crunk past." Matthew Horton of BBC Music said that the song's "high-speed electro-jacking is a lesson in ferocious dancefloor inspiration." Jon Caramanica of The New York Times said the song was one of the Basic Instinct tracks that "mingles music with lust as programmed drums and keyboards pound and blip." Randall Roberts of The Los Angeles Times criticized the song's lyrical content, commenting that it "makes the Black Eyed Peas seem positively Shakespearean."

"Gimmie Dat" debuted on the UK R&B Chart at number 27 on October 27, 2010. The single debuted at number 70 on the US Hot R&B/Hip-Hop Songs chart on the week of November 20, 2010.

== Live performances ==
Ciara performed "Gimmie Dat" live on The Ellen DeGeneres Show for the first time on December 15, 2010. The following day, on December 16, she performed it on Lopez Tonight. It was also performed in an episode of Hellcats when she guest starred as herself.

== Music video ==
The song's music video is directed by Melina and Ciara and was filmed on September 6, 2010, in Los Angeles. Photos from the shoot were released on September 10, 2010. An unedited version of the video premiered online on October 11, 2010. The official video premiered on Vevo on October 12, 2010, and since then has received favorable reviews from critics.

The video begins with Ciara arriving to an abandoned warehouse in a Lamborghini, where she then gets out of the vehicle and pops off the front hood, showing speakers as the song beings to play. She then struts across the road and performs her famous matrix move in custom designed Converse heels. The singer then makes her way inside the warehouse to perform intense choreography with several male dancers. The military-inspired dance routine has been highly compared to Janet Jackson's "Rhythm Nation" music video. During this the video shows Ciara dancing by herself and moving seductively against the wall. In the final scenes, she dances solo in the rain where she performs a tribute to the late James Brown, the video then video cuts to another scene showing her dancing with multiple versions of her until the song finishes. The singer wears multiple outfits throughout the entire video.

== Formats and track listings ==
- Digital download
1. "Gimmie Dat" – 4:12
- Double A-side single
1. "Gimmie Dat" – 4:12
2. "Speechless" – 4:10
- Digital download (Remix)
1. "Gimmie Dat (Slow Bass Remix)" – 3:56
- Double A-side EP
1. "Gimmie Dat" – 4:12
2. "Speechless" – 4:10
3. "Gimmie Dat" (Music video) – 4:18
4. "Speechless" (Music video) – 4:11

== Charts ==
Chart (2010)	Peak position
German Black (Deutsche Trend)	6
UK Singles (Official Charts Company)	111
UK R&B (Official Charts Company)	27
US Bubbling Under Hot 100 (Billboard)	16
US Hot R&B/Hip-Hop Songs (Billboard)	63

== Radio dates and release history ==
Country	Date	Format	Label
Canada	October 15, 2010	Digital download	LaFace Records
Europe	October 15, 2010	Digital EP	Sony Music Entertainment
Australia	October 15, 2010	Digital EP	Sony Music Entertainment
New Zealand	October 15, 2010	Digital EP	Sony Music Entertainment
United Kingdom	October 24, 2010	Digital download	Sony Music Entertainment
United States	November 2, 2010	Digital download	LaFace Records
United States	November 9, 2010	Urban mainstream and rhythmic radio	LaFace Records
United States	December 21, 2010	Digital download (Remix)	LaFace Records
