= Screamfest '07 =

2007 concert tour by T.I. and Ciara

- National tour by T.I. and Ciara
- Promotional poster for the 2007 tour
- Location: North America
- Start date: August 3, 2007
- End date: September 2, 2007
- Legs: 1
- No. of shows: 20 in North America
T.I. tour chronology
Screamfest '07 (2007)
Ciara tour chronology
Ciara: Live in Concert (2006)	Screamfest '07 (2007)	Jay-Z & Ciara Live (2009)

Screamfest '07 was a summer concert tour headlined by American rapper T.I. and R&B singer Ciara. The tour featured performances from Lloyd, T-Pain, Yung Joc, Tiffany Evans, Yung Berg and 50 Cent. It was a 20-city tour that took place from August 3, 2007 until September 2, 2007 in the United States. The tour was scheduled to begin July 23, 2007, but it was changed for unknown reasons.

== Tour dates ==
Date	City	Country	Venue
August 3, 2007	New Orleans	United States	New Orleans Arena
August 4, 2007	Houston	United States	Toyota Center
August 6, 2007	Grand Prairie	United States	Nokia Live at Grand Prairie
August 9, 2007	Cleveland	United States	Wolstein Center
August 10, 2007	Rosemont	United States	Allstate Arena
August 11, 2007	St. Louis	United States	Scottrade Center
August 12, 2007	Kansas City	United States	Kemper Arena
August 17, 2007	Indianapolis	United States	Indiana State Fair
August 18, 2007	Washington, D.C.	United States	Verizon Center
August 19, 2007	Hampton	United States	Hampton Coliseum
August 21, 2007	Mansfield	United States	Tweeter Center
August 22, 2007	New York City	United States	Madison Square Garden
August 23, 2007	Philadelphia	United States	Wachovia Center
August 24, 2007	Baltimore	United States	1st Mariner Arena
August 25, 2007	Greensboro	United States	Greensboro Coliseum
August 26, 2007	Atlanta	United States	Philips Arena
August 29, 2007	Greenwood Village	United States	Fiddler's Green Amphitheatre
August 31, 2007	San Jose	United States	HP Pavilion
September 1, 2007	Los Angeles	United States	Gibson Amphitheatre
September 2, 2007	Los Angeles	United States	Gibson Amphitheatre
