= Speechless (Ciara song) =

Single by Ciara

from the album Basic Instinct
- A-side: "Gimmie Dat"
- Released: September 7, 2010
- Studio: Boom Boom Room (Burbank); Nash Estate (Atlanta); Triangle Sound (Atlanta)
- Genre: R&B
- Length: 4:10
- Label: LaFace
- Songwriters: Ciara; Terius "The-Dream" Nash; C. "Tricky Stewart"
- Producers: Tricky Stewart; The-Dream

Ciara singles chronology
"Ride" (2010)	"Speechless" (2010)	"Gimmie Dat" (2010)

Music video
- "Speechless" on YouTube

"Speechless" is a song by American singer-songwriter Ciara. The song was written by Ciara, The-Dream, and Tricky Stewart, with the latter two producing the song as well. Taken from her fourth studio album Basic Instinct, the song serves as the second single from the album. It was released in the United States as a digital download on September 7, 2010.

"Speechless" is a mid-tempo R&B love song, which utilizes synthesized trumpets and horns as a backdrop. The lyrical content of the song centers around the protagonist saying they need more time to confess how perfect their significant other is. The song's accompanying music video, directed by Colin Tilley, features Ciara in a menagerie of scenes. The single had no direct promotion and was never officially promoted to radio, leading it to only reach 74 on the US Hot R&B/Hip-Hop Songs.

== Background and composition ==
"Speechless"
A sample of "Speechless," which is built heavily around synthesized trumpets and horns.

In September 2009, Tricky Stewart, confirmed via Rap-Up that he and The-Dream had spent the entire summer with Ciara working on her upcoming fourth studio album. He also named "Speechless" as one of two songs he hoped would appear on the album. The album version of the song leaked in March 2010, featuring vocals from The-Dream. However, following the release of its single cover on August 18, 2010, it was confirmed that the song would feature only Ciara. It was also revealed that The-Dream will not be featured on the album version of the song when the official track listing of Basic Instinct was revealed. On the final cut, American songwriter, gospel singer, and session vocalist Lauren Evans performs background vocals. The song was planned to be released as the second official single, how was never sent to radio or released as a CD single.

"Speechless" is a midtempo, R&B love song, featuring trumpet-sounding synths. Andy Kellman of Allmusic said that the song works a "slow motion glide" and that Ciara's voice "hovers in a love-struck daze." The lyrical content of the song consists of the protagonist confesses how perfect her significant other is, and that they need extra time to confess this, such as lines like "I'd need an extra month on the year, one extra holiday just to kiss you all over your face."

== Critical reception ==
Praising the production of The-Dream and Tricky Stewart on the album, Matthew Horton of BBC Music called the song "crisp" and said that it was a "trim, anthemic synth ballad." Noting it as one of their choice picks from the album, Andy Kellman of Allmusic called the song "euphoric" and was the best of The-Dream and Tricky's seven songs on the album. A Rap-Up writer noted the song as a standout track from the album. Ed Easton Jr. of WXRK said the song "reminds all her fans that she can actually sing and be taken seriously as an actual artist rather than an over-hyped dancer." As one of the album's "emotionally demanding cuts," Ken Capobianco of Boston Globe said that the song "lacked conviction." Becky Bain of Idolator was less than enthusiastic of the song, commenting, "basically, we’re speechless, too, but only because we can’t find much to rave about." Bain also called the synth-beat generic and "run-of-the-mill," comparing it to her "Love Sex Magic."

"Speechless" debuted on the US Hot R&B/Hip-Hop Songs chart at number ninety-one on the week of September 18, 2010. It went on to peak at number seventy-four. The song was featured as one of the A-sides for "Gimmie Dat", in the UK, where the latter peaked at number 111 on the UK Singles chart.

== Music video ==
Ciara in front of a stone wall in the video.

The video was directed in Los Angeles, California on September 10, 2010 by Colin Tilley. It chronicles Ciara in a menagerie of settings, in the mountains, a mansion, a reflection pool, and a warehouse. The minimalistic clip sees numerous wardrobe changes, and unlike typical Ciara videos, it does not highlight dance aspects. Several outfits she dons include low-riding jeans and a shirt which reveals her abs. Becky Bain of Idolator compared Ciara to Janet Jackson in the clip, noting Ciara's "oversized top and comfy jeans" to Jackson in "Again" and "Love Will Never Do." Bain positively reviewed the clip, stating, "It's a safe video, for sure, but oh-so nice to look at." A Rap-Up writer stated "after watching the grown 'n' [sic] sexy new Colin Tilley-directed video from Ciara, you're guaranteed to be left 'Speechless.'" Although he appreciated Ciara for lowering down the sex appeal and relying on her vocals, Ed Easton Jr. of WXRK gave the video seven of ten stars, and said that it was not enough to put Ciara "ahead of all the talented musical divas in the industry." Easton went on to say that "the video is not meant to be over-sexual but still gives us an intimate feel to the singer that, in the long run, may even garner better responses among all age demographics." He also complimented the video as a whole saying, "The shots of Ciara are stunning and she is shown to be serious about her quest for love from a special someone."

== Track listing ==
- US Digital download
1. "Speechless" – 4:10
- European Digital single – Gimmie Dat / Speechless
1. "Gimmie Dat" – 4:12
2. "Speechless" – 4:10
- EP – Gimmie Dat / Speechless (Europe, Canada, Australia, UK)
1. "Gimmie Dat" – 4:12
2. "Speechless" – 4:10
3. "Gimmie Dat" (music video) – 4:18
4. "Speechless" (music video) – 4:11

== Credits and personnel ==
- Songwriting – Ciara Princess Harris, Terius "The-Dream" Nash, Christopher "Tricky" Stewart
- Production – The-Dream, Tricky Stewart
- Vocal recording and production – Kuk Harrell
- Background vocals – Lauren Evans
- Mixing – Jaycen Joshua
- Engineering – Brian "B-LUV" Thomas, Pat Thrall, Andrew Wuepper, assisted by Luis Navarro, Randy Urbanski, Zachariah Redding, Jason Sherwood, Steven Dennis.

== Charts ==
Chart (2010)	Peak position
US Hot R&B/Hip-Hop Songs (Billboard)	74

== Release history ==
Region	Format	Date	Label
United States	Digital download	September 7, 2010	LaFace Records
Canada	Digital download	September 21, 2010	Sony Music Entertainment
Netherlands	Digital download	September 24, 2010	Sony Music Entertainment
Sweden	Digital download	September 24, 2010	Sony Music Entertainment
Finland	Digital download	September 27, 2010	Sony Music Entertainment
France	Digital download	September 27, 2010	Sony Music Entertainment
Norway	Digital download	September 27, 2010	Sony Music Entertainment
Italy	Digital download	October 1, 2010	Sony Music Entertainment
Austria	Digital download	October 8, 2010	Sony Music Entertainment
Ireland	Digital download	October 8, 2010	Sony Music Entertainment
Germany	Digital download	October 15, 2010	Sony Music Entertainment
