= Get Up (Ciara song) =

2006 single by Ciara

Single by Ciara featuring Chamillionaire

from the album Ciara: The Evolution and Step Up (Original Soundtrack)
- Released: July 25, 2006
- Genre: Crunk&B
- Length: 4:21
- Label: LaFace
- Songwriters: Ciara Harris; Hakeem Seriki; Phalon Alexander; Rockwell
- Producer: Jazze Pha

Ciara singles chronology
| "So What" (2006) | "Get Up" (2006) | "Promise" (2006) |

Chamillionaire singles chronology
| "Ridin'" (2005) | "Get Up" (2006) | "Grown and Sexy" (2006) |

Music video
- "Get Up" on YouTube

"Get Up" is a song by American recording artist Ciara. Released on July 25, 2006, the song serves as the first single from the original soundtrack to the film Step Up (2006), as well as the lead single for her second album, Ciara: The Evolution. It features American rapper Chamillionaire. The song was written by the singer and rapper with her mentor Jazze Pha, who produced the song. The song is a hip-hop number, accompanied by dance music sounds, while integrating a crunk beat. The song received generally positive reviews from music critics, who compared it to her previous work, namely "1, 2 Step."

The single received generally positive reviews from music critics with most of them praising the production of the song and the songs genre; the song was noted for containing a "minimalist crunk grind which helped her debut sell three million copies". Additionally, the song was noted for being one of the highlights of the album, being called a "catchy, blipping track." "Get Up" peaked in the top ten in New Zealand and the United States, becoming her seventh top ten hit. It was later certified platinum in the United States by the Recording Industry Association of America.

The song's accompanying music video, which takes place in a club surrounded by a cityscape, makes use of several visual effects including CGI animation and Unilux high-speed xenon strobes. Ciara performed the song a number of times, including at the 2006 Macy's Thanksgiving Day Parade, and on the second season of So You Think You Can Dance.

In May 2025, Ciara released the single "So & So", alongside British DJ Flex (UK); the song is a remixed, re-recorded version of "Get Up".

== Background and composition ==
"Get Up"
A sample of "Get Up," which is reminiscent of "1, 2 Step".

In an April 2023 interview with Comedy Hype, Jazze Pha stated that "Get Up" was originally written and intended for Janet Jackson, but somehow ended up in the hands of Ciara and was reworked for the Step Up soundtrack. In an interview with MTV News, Ciara confirmed that she wrote and produced the song with mentor and previous collaborator Jazze Pha, and would be included on the soundtrack to the film, Step Up, starring Channing Tatum and Jenna Dewan. The song was sent for urban airplay on June 26, 2006, and mainstream airplay on August 21. It was released for digital download and vinyl single on July 25, 2006. The song was released as a CD single in several international markets on September 11, 2006.

"Get Up," described to be in a moderate hip-hop groove, is a Crunk song with a length of three minutes and seventeen seconds. Set in common time, it is written in the key of C minor. Ciara's vocals span from the low note of E♭_{3} to C_{5} It carries a techno-influenced crunk beat, accompanied by Ciara's signature "shimmering vocals." Baz Dresinger of Blender noted similarities between the song and "1, 2 Step." Dorian Lynskey of The Guardian said the song "winks" at Kraftwerk's "Tour de France."

== Critical reception ==
Andy Kellman of Allmusic and Bill Lamb of About.com noted the song as one of the top tracks on Ciara: The Evolution. Jody Rosen of Entertainment Weekly called the song a "catchy, blipping track." Dan Gennoe of Yahoo! Music UK said that songs such as "Get Up," "That's Right," and "Like A Boy" "revive the minimalist crunk grind which helped her debut sell three million copies." Tammy La Gorce, an editorial reviewer for Amazon.com said that the "Chamillionaire-pumped" song was "a play-it-loud club number, full of hip-hop heat." Although he said the song lacked "emotional impact" and that it "cries out for bass," Matt Cibula of PopMatters said the track was "bidding far to be the big dance hit from this album," calling Chamillionaire's rap "nifty."

== Chart performance ==
After garnering strong airplay, prior to its release, "Get Up" debuted at number 93 on the US Billboard Hot 100 chart. After it was released for digital download, it debuted at number three on the US Hot Digital Songs chart, and reached its peak at number seven on the Hot 100. Later, it also peaked at number seven on the Hot 100 Airplay, and at 13 on the Pop 100. The song became Ciara's fourth top ten hit on the Hot R&B/Hip-Hop Songs chart. The single was certified platinum by the Recording Industry Association of America (RIAA) for sales of over a million digital copies in the United States.

The single was also successful in other territories, On the New Zealand Singles Chart, the song entered at number nine and peaked at number five the following week. The week of October 8, 2006, the single debuted and peaked at number 17 on the Swiss Singles Chart. The song's success in Europe resulted in it peaking at number 86 on the European Hot 100. On the Austrian Singles Chart, it debuted at number 72, later peaking at number 59 during the week of October 20, 2006. "Get Up" also peaked at number 29 on the German Singles Chart, spending seven weeks on the chart.

== Music video ==
Ciara performing choreography with dancers in the music video, accompanied by a CGI cityscape.

The music video for the song was filmed on June 30, 2006, in Los Angeles, California, directed by Joseph Kahn. It features several special effects, which include the effects of macro lenses on real bodies, intermediate CGI bodies, and 2-D wipes and morphs.

=== Synopsis ===
The video follows Ciara as she goes clubbing. The clip begins with the singer waking up at midnight, in a black, reflective apartment, as she is dressed in black and proceeds to leave through the building's fire escape. When she arrives outside, the windows of the building brighten and fade, and the moon, stars, and lamp posts create a strobe effect. White reflectors on the street sweep around Ciara and she is surrounded by dancers, many of whom are from the film, as they ascend a dark staircase and enter the club. When everyone arrives on the roof, Ciara meets up with Chamillionaire for his verse, and thereafter Channing Tatum and Jenna Dewan, the stars of Step Up, make appearances in dance sequences. The lights of the cityscape begin to pulse to the music, and rain falls on the crowd. Unilux high-speed strobe lights are synchronized to the rain to make it appear as though many of the droplets are suspended in time.

The video ends with the camera pulling out of the sequence, with the flashing lights on the cityscape making up the flashing lights of Ciara's alarm clock from the beginning of the video. Henry Adaso of About.com gave the video three and a half out of five stars, stating that even though the song was a summer hit, when up against the recently released "Déjà Vu" video, Adaso said, "While Ciara gives Beyoncé a run for her money, the dance moves are unoriginal."

== Live performances ==
The singer performed the song on several occasions. She performed the song on the second season finale of So You Think You Can Dance. She later appeared on The Ellen DeGeneres Show to perform the song on December 5, 2006, as well as the 2006 Macy's Thanksgiving Day Parade, the 2006 St. Lucia Jazz Festival, and MTV Goes Gold: New Year's Eve 2007.

== Credits and personnel ==
- Ciara Harris – vocals, writer
- Hakeem Seriki – vocals, writer
- Phalon Alexander – writer, producer
- Lesli Brathwaite – mixing
- Cedric Williams – keyboard

== Formats and track listings ==
- 12-inch vinyl
1. "Get Up" (Main Version) – 4:22
2. "Get Up" (Instrumental) – 3:58
3. "Get Up" (Acapella)
- CD single
1. "Get Up" – 4:22
2. "Get Up" (No Rap) – 3:58
- Digital download
1. "Get Up" (Main Version) – 4:22
2. "Get Up" (Kardinal Beats Remix) – 4:18
- Digital EP
1. "Get Up" – 4:22
2. "Get Up" (Moto Blanco Vocal Mix) – 8:15
3. "Get Up" (Digital Dog – Club Mix) – 6:28
4. "Get Up" (Kardinal Beats Remix) – 4:18
- Digital EP
1. "Get Up" (feat. Chamilioniare) – 3:52
2. "Get Up" (feat. Chamilioniare) [Moto Blanco Radio Edit] - 3:54
3. "Get Up" (feat. Chamilioniare) [Moto Blanco Vocal Mix] – 8:15
4. "Get Up" (feat. Chamilioniare) [Digital Dog – Club Mix] – 6:28
5. "Get Up" (feat. Chamilioniare) [Kardinal Beats Remix] – 4:18

== Charts ==
=== Weekly charts ===
Weekly chart performance for "Get Up"
| Chart (2006–2007) | Peak position |
|---|---|
| Austria (Ö3 Austria Top 40) | 59 |
| Canada CHR/Top 40 (Billboard) | 24 |
| European Hot 100 Singles (Billboard) | 86 |
| Germany (GfK) | 29 |
| Lithuania (EHR) | 23 |
| New Zealand (Recorded Music NZ) | 5 |
| Romania (Romanian Top 100) | 52 |
| Switzerland (Schweizer Hitparade) | 17 |
| UK Singles (OCC) | 189 |
| US Billboard Hot 100 | 7 |
| US Hot R&B/Hip-Hop Songs (Billboard) | 10 |
| US Pop Airplay (Billboard) | 15 |
| US Rhythmic Airplay (Billboard) | 7 |

=== Year-end charts ===
Year-end chart performance for "Get Up"
| Chart (2006) | Position |
|---|---|
| US Billboard Hot 100 | 80 |
| US Hot R&B/Hip-Hop Songs (Billboard) | 61 |
| US Rhythmic (Billboard) | 28 |

== Certifications ==
Certifications for "Get Up"
| Region | Certification | Certified units/sales |
|---|---|---|
| New Zealand (RMNZ) | Gold | 15,000^{‡} |
| United Kingdom (BPI) | Silver | 200,000^{‡} |
| United States (RIAA) | Platinum | 1,000,000^{‡} |
^{‡} Sales+streaming figures based on certification alone.

== Release history ==
Release dates and formats for "Get Up"
| Region | Date | Format | Label(s) | Ref. |
|---|---|---|---|---|
| United States | August 21, 2006 | Mainstream airplay | Jive; Zomba | |
