= Can't Leave 'em Alone =

2007 single by Ciara and 50 Cent

Single by Ciara featuring 50 Cent

from the album Ciara: The Evolution
- B-side: "Love You Better"
- Released: June 12, 2007
- Recorded: 2006
- Genre: R&B; hip-hop
- Length: 4:04
- Label: LaFace
- Songwriters: Ciara Harris; LaShawn Daniels; Rodney Jerkins; Curtis Jackson
- Producer: Darkchild

Ciara singles chronology
| "Promise Ring" (2007) | "Can't Leave 'em Alone" (2007) | "Stepped on My J'z" (2008) |

50 Cent singles chronology
| "Amusement Park" (2007) | "Can't Leave 'em Alone" (2007) | "Straight to the Bank" (2007) |

Music video
- "Can't Leave 'Em Alone" on YouTube

"Can't Leave 'em Alone" is a song recorded by American singer Ciara featuring rapper 50 Cent for Ciara's second album, Ciara: The Evolution (2006). Written by Ciara, LaShawn Daniels, Rodney Jerkins, and 50 Cent, it is the fourth release and official third single from the album (see 2007 in music). It was solicited to Mainstream Urban radio stations on June 12, 2007, and Rhythmic stations on July 10, 2007.

The song is a 1980s-inspired mid-tempo ballad, featuring the 808 drums. Ciara described it as a "big record", and said that she invited 50 Cent for "some kind of flavor". It was originally titled "Dope Boys". The song was later sampled in the 2019 single "Leave Em Alone" by Layton Greene and Lil Baby.

== Background ==
"Can't Leave 'em Alone", along with "That's Right", was originally a contender to be the second US and first worldwide single from the album, and a poll was posted on Ciara's MySpace page to have fans help her decide, but the other contender "Like a Boy" was chosen over both songs. Later, "My Love" was confirmed to be the third US single, while "That's Right" would serve as the third internationally, but "Can't Leave 'em Alone" replaced both songs.

== Composition ==
"Can't Leave 'em Alone" is an ode to the hood boys anchored by a pair of verses from 50 Cent, featuring an "easy groove".

== Critical reception ==
"Can't Leave 'em Alone" received mixed reviews from music critics. Contactmusic.com published "Can't Leave 'em Alone" is a "mouth-watering smouldering smoothed groove", with the reviewer going on to say that it should have been the first single, and that It has "cross over potential that we see from Nelly & Kelly Rowland ["Dilemma"]" and is "simply another Darkchild classic". Ken Barnes of USA TODAY called the song "pop-soul confection". Other reviewers were more critical of the song. Cibula of PopMatters published that it is "a very bad pop-lite song" and criticized the use of 50 Cent as a sexy bad boy. Christian Hoard of Rolling Stone published "Ciara's still prone to diva blandness and silly little pop songs, which drags down the 50 Cent feature 'Can't Leave 'em Alone' ". Makkadah Selah of The Village Voice called the song "lifeless".

== Chart performance ==
"Can't Leave 'em Alone" was a moderate success in the US. Six weeks after its official release, The single debuted at 90 on the US Billboard Hot 100. The song climbed the charts slowly with moderate airplay and digital sales. It eventually reached its peak at number 40. It also peaked at number 24 on the Hot 100 Airplay. It became Ciara's tenth top 10 single on the US Hot R&B/Hip-Hop Songs chart and peaked in the top half of the Rhythmic Top 40. The single was never sent to mainstream radio formats and failed to chart on the Pop 100. Despite its lackluster performance at radio, the single was certified gold by the Recording Industry Association of America (RIAA) for sales of over 500,000 digital copies in the United States.

In international markets, "Can't Leave 'em Alone" debuted at number 40 and peaked at number 4, becoming Ciara's fifth top 10 single in New Zealand. The song failed to chart in the United Kingdom, reaching a disappointing number 115. The single peaked at low positions in China, Germany, and Poland.

== Music video ==
The Fat Cats directed video was shot on June 9, 2007, and June 10, 2007, in Atlanta, Georgia. Three screen shots from the music video were released on June 14, 2007, while a fourth screen shot featuring her and 50 Cent was released on June 27, 2007. The video was scheduled to premiere on Yahoo! Music on June 25, but it was changed to July 2, 2007.

The video reached number 1 on 106 & Park and on YouTube it has received over 70 million views as of April 2024.

== Live performances ==
Ciara performed "Can't Leave 'em Alone" with 50 Cent at the 2007 World Music Awards on November 24, 2007.

== Formats and track listings ==
These are the formats and track listings of major single releases of "Can't Leave 'Em Alone".

- Maxi single Digital download
1. "Can't Leave 'em Alone" featuring 50 Cent
2. "Love You Better"
- US CD single
1. "Can't Leave 'em Alone" featuring 50 Cent
2. "Do It"
3. "Like a Boy" (Kardinal Beats Remix)
4. "Can't Leave 'em Alone" (Ringtone)
- Extended play
1. "Can't Leave 'em Alone" featuring 50 Cent
2. "Can't Leave 'em Alone (Kookie Remix)" featuring 50 Cent
3. "Can't Leave 'em Alone (Wideboys Remix)" featuring 50 Cent
4. "Can't Leave 'em Alone (Reavers Remix)" featuring 50 Cent

== Personnel ==
- Recorded by Jeff Villanueva at 2nd Floor Studios, Atlantic City, New Jersey & Joshua Charvokas at Chung King Studios, New York City
- Engineered by Gilbert Fuentes
- Mixed by Phil Tan at Soapbox Studios, Atlanta, Georgia
- Assisted by Josh Houghkirk
- All music by Rodney "Darkchild" Jerkins
- Vocals produced by Ciara Harris, LaShawn Daniels and Rodney Jerkins

== Charts ==
=== Weekly charts ===
| Chart (2007) | Peak position |
|---|---|
| Germany (GfK) | 44 |
| New Zealand (Recorded Music NZ) | 4 |
| Switzerland (Schweizer Hitparade) | 67 |
| UK Singles (OCC) | 109 |
| US Billboard Hot 100 | 40 |
| US Hot R&B/Hip-Hop Songs (Billboard) | 10 |
| US Rhythmic Airplay (Billboard) | 17 |

=== Year-end charts ===
| Chart (2007) | Position |
|---|---|
| US Top R&B/Hip-Hop Songs (Billboard) | 58 |

== Certifications ==
| Region | Certification | Certified units/sales |
|---|---|---|
| New Zealand (RMNZ) | Platinum | 30,000^{‡} |
| United States (RIAA) | Gold | 500,000^{‡} |
^{‡} Sales+streaming figures based on certification alone.

== Release history ==
| Country | Format | Date | Label |
|---|---|---|---|
| Germany | CD single | August 10, 2007 | Zomba Label Group |
| United States | Rhythm/Crossover radio | June 10, 2007 | LaFace Records, RCA Records |
| United States | Rhythmic radio | July 10, 2007 | LaFace Records, RCA Records |
| Germany | Maxi Single, Digital download | August 10, 2007 | LaFace Records |
| Switzerland | Digital download | August 10, 2007 | LaFace Records |
| Sweden | Digital download | August 13, 2007 | LaFace Records |
| Canada | CD single | August 20, 2007 | Sony BMG |
| Ireland | Extended play | September 7, 2007 | Zomba Label Group |
| Sweden | Extended play | September 7, 2007 | Zomba Label Group |
| Switzerland | Extended play | September 7, 2007 | Zomba Label Group |
| United Kingdom | Extended play | September 7, 2007 | Zomba Label Group |
| Germany | Extended play | September 10, 2007 | Zomba Label Group |
