= That's Right (Ciara song) =

2006 song by Ciara

Song by Ciara featuring Lil Jon

from the album Ciara: The Evolution
- Recorded: 2006
- Genre: Crunk&B
- Length: 4:16
- Label: LaFace
- Songwriters: Ciara Harris; Jonathan Smith; Jasper Cameron; Balewa Muhammad; Candice Nelson; LaMarquis Jefferson
- Producer: Lil Jon

Music video
- "That's Right" on YouTube

"That's Right" is a song by American singer Ciara for her second album, Ciara: The Evolution. Written mainly by Ciara and produced by Lil Jon, the song reunites Ciara with Lil Jon, who produced Ciara's debut single, "Goodies". "That's Right" is an up-tempo crunk female empowerment song telling the story about a woman who does not let her boyfriend's selfish needs prevent her from going out to the club and having fun.

== Composition ==
"That's Right" was written by Ciara, Lil Jon, LaMarquis Jefferson, Candice Nelson, Balewa Muhammad, and Jasper Cameron. The song samples Lathun's "Freak It" (produced by Lil Jon) as well as Raheem The Dream's "The Most Beautiful Girl in the World". The song is a crunk song, the sound that Lil Jon is known for.

== Background ==
"That's Right" was initially confirmed as the fourth official single from Ciara: The Evolution. It was initially meant to be the third UK single from the album. However, it was decided that "Can't Leave 'Em Alone" would be released instead. There were rumors that "That's Right" was slated for release as the next single after "Can't Leave 'Em Alone," but eventually it was cancelled for unknown reasons. It was one of three choices with "Like a Boy" and "Can't Leave 'Em Alone" for the second US single, according to Ciara's official MySpace voting poll. However, "Like a Boy" was released before polling was completed. The single was confirmed on Ciara's official MySpace blog.

== Critical reception ==
"That's Right" received positive reviews from music critics. Jill Menze of Billboard magazine called the song a "bass-heavy, dancefloor jam." Jody Rosen of Entertainment Weekly said the song "combines eerily quiet crooning with a squall of synthesizer buzzes and percussion clatter." Matt Cibula of PopMatters labelled it as a "powerful booty-bass-lovin' bubble-crunk to the 9th degree." Bertan Budak of Ukmusic.com called it an "electrifying album opener." Budak continued to say Ciara sings with a "sexy mellow voice with Jon's in your face type rapping."

== Music video ==
The music video for "That's Right" was directed by The Fat Cats and filmed the day before the filming of "Can't Leave 'Em Alone." On July 11, 2007, a clip of the video videotaped by an unknown person, was released on the internet. On December 25, 2007 at midnight, the video became available for download on Ciara's official MySpace blog. On January 15, 2008, "That's Right" premiered on BET's 106 & Park.

The video begins with a close-out shot of a gas station, amongst which a telephone rings. The shot changes to where we see Ciara, Monica, and Ciara's head-choreographer, Jamaica, sitting in a car at a gas pump. Ciara sends the caller "straight to voice-mail" and begins to discuss how she desires to secure her own independence in taking it from her significant other by going for a night out at the club and having a good time. The shot changes again to where Lil Jon is shouting "I bet you won't get crunk!" Ciara proceeds to ride down the street until she reaches a "food mart" where she seductively dances in sync to choreography along with her male friends. The video shot then changes to Ciara provocatively dressed in all leather with her girls "gettin' crunk." They all begin to dance in a suggestive manner until the song's ending where a distant fading shot of Ciara is shown.

== Charts ==
Chart (2008)	Peak position
New Zealand Urban Airplay (RMNZ)	37
