= Promise (Ciara song) =

Single by Ciara

from the album Ciara: The Evolution
- Released: October 16, 2006 (U.S.)
- Recorded: 2006
- Studio: Soapbox (Atlanta, Georgia)
- Genre: R&B
- Length: 4:29
- Label: LaFace
- Songwriters: Ciara Harris, Jasper Cameron, Ren B Jamal Jones, Elvis Williams
- Producers: Polow da Don, Black Elvis

Ciara singles chronology
| "Get Up" (2006) | "Promise" (2006) | "Like a Boy" (2007) |

Music video
- "Promise" on YouTube

"Promise" is a song performed by American recording artist Ciara from her second studio album, Ciara: The Evolution (2006). It was written by Ciara, Jasper Cameron, Polow da Don and Elvis Williams and produced by Polow da Don and Black Elvis. The song was released as the album's official lead single on October 16, 2006, through LaFace Records. The song was selected as the first single as Ciara wanted to put out a single with a slower pace, noting that her previous releases had been up-tempo. According to Ciara, the song represents the album's theme of evolving and symbolizes her growth as a songwriter and artist.

"Promise" is a mid-tempo R&B ballad with lyrics that describe what the protagonist wants out of love. The song received generally positive reviews from critics, who made comparisons with songs by musician Prince. Critics also observed that it was different and refreshing from Ciara's previous singles. "Promise" topped the US Hot R&B/Hip-Hop Songs chart in the United States and peaked at number 11 on the US Billboard Hot 100, becoming Ciara's best-performing single sans a featured artist on both charts. It was certified platinum by the Recording Industry Association of America (RIAA) for shipping over one million copies.

Diane Martel directed the song's accompanying music video, which features scenes of Ciara singing into a gravity-defying microphone. Ciara stated that it is just about performance as she wanted to make a distinct R&B video. The video received a BET Award nomination for Viewer's Choice in 2007.

== Writing and inspiration ==
"Promise" was one of the first songs to be recorded for Ciara's sophomore effort, Ciara: The Evolution. The song was conceived as a "feel-good" record; Ciara explained that the goal was to create a song that "truly is a sing-along". She elaborated, "I want you to be able to go back to the old days, and put your hands up and rock from side to side and just feel good." The singer wrote it in collaboration with Noah Ojomo, Jasper Cameron, Elvis Williams and its producer, Jamal "Polow da Don" Jones. The recording session took place at Tree Sound Studios in Atlanta, Georgia, and co-writer Williams provided backing vocals. Ciara and Cameron produced the vocals and Phil Tan later mixed the song at Soapbox Studios in Los Angeles, California. On the album, "Promise" is preceded by the spoken-word interlude "The Evolution of Music", in which Ciara shares that music on the radio inspired her to "do something different this time around".

In an interview with Corey Moss for MTV News, Ciara stated that "Promise" is about being single as she had ended her one-year relationship with rapper Bow Wow several months prior in April 2006. She named her album The Evolution as she felt evolved, both as a woman and an artist and stated that the song symbolizes her growth. She said that it was "perfect" as the first single because it makes a statement. "The record was something different from what people were used to hearing me do. So this record does have a more mature sounding, sexier vibe", she said. Ciara declared "Promise" as "different" from her other work, and considered it one of the album's most unusual and strongest songs, citing the production as an example of this. Polow da Don told Billboard that the song is "young but sexy" and noted that "nobody's really heard [Ciara] do a ballad". In an interview with Mark Edward Nero for About.com, Ciara explained why she selected "Promise" as the album's first official single, noting that it has a different tempo from her previous singles:

When I did a recap of all the records I released prior to my first single for this album, I noticed that all of them were up-tempo. ... and I wanted to change it up and still make sure the elements, ... that people know me and my fans know me for were still in there such as the dancing so, ... I wanted to try something different, ... change the pace a little bit and that's what I did with this record. I felt it was perfect for that.

== Composition ==
"Promise" is a mid-tempo pop influenced R&B song. The ballad does not have a real instrumental intro; instead, Ciara opens the song with seductive lines: "Come enjoy the night/Baby take a bite". She sings in a falsetto. According to sheet music published at Musicnotes.com by EMI Music Publishing, "Promise" is written in the time signature of common time, with a moderate beat rate of 72 beats per minute. The song is written in the key of A major; Ciara's vocal range spans from the low-note of C♯_{3} to the high-note of F♯_{5}. It has a basic sequence of D_{9}–E–C♯m_{7} as its chord progression. Critics have compared the song to works by American musician Prince, particularly the song "Adore" from his 1987 album Sign o' the Times. Although the song lacks crunk elements, Steve Knopper of Newsday noted that its "booming, house-party sound effects" befits Ciara's honorific title of "The First Lady of Crunk&B". Lyrically, the song speaks of the female protagonist's needs and what she wants out of love. Ciara explained: "I'm someone that goes hard for a guy that I like, and this record is saying there's nothing I want to do but spend my life with you, whoever that guy is that I envision."

== Release and remix ==
"Promise" was selected as the official lead single for Ciara: The Evolution; it was preceded by "Get Up" featuring Chamillionaire, which was released as a single from the soundtrack for the film Step Up (2006) on July 25, 2006, and later appeared on The Evolution. "Promise" was serviced for rhythmic contemporary and urban contemporary airplay on October 16, 2006, through LaFace Records. It was only released in North America; the next single, "Like a Boy" (2007) served as the album's international lead single. "Promise" was first made available for purchase as a 12" vinyl single on October 31, 2006. The single cover was photographed by Mark Mann. The single was later released through digital distribution on November 7, 2006, and sent for contemporary hit radio playlists on January 15, 2007. An official remix featuring R. Kelly, titled "Go and Get Your Tickets Mix", debuted on radio in late-January 2007, and was digitally released on February 6. As of January 2019, following allegations of sexual violence against Kelly on the Lifetime docu-series, Surviving R. Kelly, Ciara removed the "Go and Get Your Tickets" remix of "Promise" from streaming services.

== Critical reception ==
Clover Hope of Billboard wrote a positive review regarding "Promise" and noted that it may be "unlike any other Ciara single released thus far", calling it "sultry and deliberate, the kind of song that grows on you". Hope remarked: "While the carefully measured tempo sounds incompatible with her whispery cadence, it is also strangely appealing—particularly the changes in melody. Despite some juvenile lyrics, 'Promise' finds Ciara on a refreshing new plateau: No 1, 2 steps here." The Washington Post's Chris Richards commented that Ciara "gets it right" with "Promise", saying that it "thread[s] a more distinctive melody through the Prince-inspired grooves", and named it one of the album's best tracks. Andy Kellman of AllMusic called it "tremendous, one of the sexiest, slow-tempo, non-breakup songs of the past ten years". He selected it as one of The Evolution's standouts and deemed it the only "clear-cut" highlight.

USA Today critic Elysa Gardner commented that Ciara plays a "demure temptress" on the single, showcasing a "slight but sweetly tangy voice and budding emotional presence". While reviewing the album, St. Louis Post-Dispatch's Kevin Johnson commented that Ciara is best at taking "a whisper of a voice, lay it on top of a muscular beat, and come out smelling rosy" on "big-bottom ballads", referring to "Promise". Dan Duke of The Virginian-Pilot recommended the track for digital download. Sal Cinquemani of Slant Magazine wrote that the song is "decidedly different" from Ciara's previous singles, which he believed indicated that the singer "is, in fact, evolving—at least in terms of marketing". Cinquemani deemed "Promise" an example of a producer making better Prince songs than Prince himself. While noting that the album's theme is evolution, Jim Abbott of Orlando Sentinel stated that "Unfortunately, it's nostalgia, not evolution, that makes a sexy ballad such as 'Promise' so appealing."

Mark Edward Nero of About.com remarked that "Promise" is among the album's better tracks, but wrote that her vocals "lack emotion". PopMatters critic Matt Cibula said that the song is "slow, it is weird, it is massive", but criticized Ciara's vocals for sounding "tiny" and "clipped next to Polow Da Don's track". However, he ended on a more positive note, writing: "But even though her vocal track is more or less another instrument here, she still sounds heartbroken and kind of sincere, and it works. It ain't genius, quite, but it's close enough for me." Makkada Selah of The Village Voice was more critical regarding The Evolution's ballads, calling them "pretty, but perfunctory and bland". Selah wrote, "Just try to ignore the fact that Ciara's 'Promise' is just Prince's 'Adore' except her coy falsetto can't begin to match the Purple One's vocal gymnastics."

== Chart performance ==
"Promise" debuted on the US Bubbling Under Hot 100 Singles at number 24. Two weeks later, the song debuted at 45 on the US Billboard Hot 100, making the single Ciara's highest debut and the top debut of the week. On the issue dated December 30, 2006, the single peaked at 11 for one week on the chart. The song then descended, staying on the chart for a total of twenty weeks. The single also peaked at number 1 for two weeks on the Hot R&B/Hip-Hop Songs, becoming Ciara's third number 1 of the chart. The song peaked at number 5 on the Rhythmic Top 40 chart, number 36 on the Top 40 Mainstream chart, and number 25 on the Hot Digital Tracks chart. "Promise." ranked number 71 on the Billboard Year-End Hot 100 singles of 2007. The single was certified platinum by the Recording Industry Association of America (RIAA) for sales of over a million digital copies in the United States.

== Music video ==
The music video for "Promise" was directed by Diane Martel and shot on October 2, 2006. In an interview with Corey Moss of MTV News, Ciara said of the video: "It's really just about the performance in this video more than anything, and the way [Martel] is lighting it. We didn't really want to do the typical R&B video." The singer screened the video on her 21st birthday party at Club Marquee in New York City on October 25, 2006. It premiered the same day on BET's Access Granted.

The video begins with Ciara, wearing a brown hooded sweater and sweat pants, dancing by herself in a secluded area. The scene shows her singing the first verse into a gravity-defying microphone. During the chorus and second verse, Ciara is seen finessing seductively in a chair, which is mixed with footage of Ciara and her dancers (Rebecca Sanchez, Jessica Bunninger, Jazmine Williams, Misunique Gillard, Candace Harring) dancing in hooded attire. Further on in the video we are introduced to a different setting in which Ciara and the dancers are seen sitting on the ground against a brick wall, exhibiting shoulder and hand movements. During the second chorus, a cabaret scene shows the silhouette of Ciara in front of a white screen, while the dancers move around on scaffolding. The shot changes once more to a visualization of Ciara on the floor sporting a petite, brown wig, reciting the spoken part of the bridge. Afterwards, Ciara dances in front of a different brick wall, in a dark area, only lit by a red spotlight. The video fades out to a scene in which we see Ciara and the dancers in somewhat of a conga line, dancing out of view.

40th best video of the 2000s.

The Video Reached Number one on BET’s Countdown show 106 & Park

& Ranked 34 on BET’s Notarized Top 100 videos of 2006 list

== Live performances ==
Ciara performed the song as part of the set list for the Ciara: Live in Concert club tour, from October to December 2006. According to Vincent Jackson of The Press of Atlantic City, Ciara "recreated some of the moves from the music video on stage with black pants, jacket and hoodie".

== Formats and track listings ==
- 12" vinyl
1. "Promise" (Main) – 4:30
2. "Promise" (Instrumental) – 4:30
3. "Promise" (Main) – 4:30
4. "Promise" (Acapella) – 4:30
- Digital download
1. "Promise" – 4:29
- Promo CD single
1. "Promise" (Main) – 4:30
2. "Promise" (Instrumental) – 4:30
3. "Promise" (Call Out Research Hook #1) – 0:07
4. "Promise" (Call Out Research Hook #2) – 0:07
- Remix download
1. "Promise" (Go and Get Your Tickets Mix) (feat. R. Kelly) – 4:59
2. "Promise" (The Great Extender Mix) – 6:53

== Credits and personnel ==
Recording

- Recorded at Tree Sound Studios, Atlanta, Georgia

Personnel

- Production – Polow da Don
- Recording – Carlton Lynn, Travis Daniels
- Assistant engineering – Wyatt Oates, Mack Woodward
- Mixing – Phil Tan
- Assistant mixing – Josh Houghkirk
- Keyboards and additional vocals – Elvis Williams
- Vocal production – Ciara Harris, Jasper Cameron

Credits are adapted from the Ciara: The Evolution liner notes.

== Charts ==
=== Weekly charts ===
| Chart (2006–2007) | Peak position |
|---|---|
| US Billboard Hot 100 | 11 |
| US Hot R&B/Hip-Hop Songs (Billboard) | 1 |
| US Pop Airplay (Billboard) | 36 |
| US Rhythmic Airplay (Billboard) | 5 |

=== Year-end charts ===
| Chart (2007) | Position |
|---|---|
| US Billboard Hot 100 | 71 |
| US Hot R&B/Hip-Hop Songs (Billboard) | 8 |
| US Rhythmic (Billboard) | 39 |

== Certifications ==
| Region | Certification | Certified units/sales |
|---|---|---|
| United States (RIAA) | Platinum | 1,000,000^{‡} |
^{‡} Sales+streaming figures based on certification alone.

== Radio add dates and release history ==
| Country | Release date | Format(s) |
|---|---|---|
| United States | October 16, 2006 | Rhythmic contemporary and urban contemporary |
| United States | October 31, 2006 | 12" vinyl single |
| United States | November 7, 2006 | Digital download |
| United States | January 15, 2007 | Contemporary hit radio |
| United States | February 6, 2007 | Remix download |

== See also ==
- List of number-one R&B singles of 2007 (U.S.)
