= Like a Boy =

Single by Ciara

from the album Ciara: The Evolution
- B-side: "Get Up"; "Love You Better"
- Released: February 13, 2007
- Studio: Chalice Studios (Los Angeles, California)
- Genre: R&B
- Length: 4:00
- Label: LaFace
- Songwriters: Ciara Harris; Justin Henderson; Christopher Whitacre; Candice Nelson; Balewa Muhammad; J. Que; Ezekiel Lewis; Calvin Kenon
- Producer: Calvo Da Gr8

Ciara singles chronology
"Promise" (2006)	"Like a Boy" (2007)	"Promise Ring" (2007)

Music video
- "Like A Boy" on YouTube

"Like a Boy" is a song performed by American singer Ciara for her second album Ciara: The Evolution (2006). Written by Ciara, Justin Henderson, Christopher Whitacre, Candice Nelson, Balewa Muhammad, J. Que, Rico Love, Ezekiel Lewis, and Calvin Kenon, it is the third release in the U.S. and second single in Europe (see 2007 in music).

The release was confirmed in a MTV News article .It was chosen before polling ended for Ciara's second single on her official myspace page, being picked over "That's Right" and "Can't Leave 'Em Alone". Although the single was a moderate hit, it failed to match the success of its North American predecessor. It was solicited to mainstream urban radio on November 14, 2006. The single was released in the United Kingdom on April 2, 2007.

== Theme and composition ==
"Like a Boy" which was written by Ciara, Candice Nelson, Balewa Muhammad, J. Que, Ezekiel Lewis, and Calvin Kenon. details about double standards in society of how men in relationships can do certain things like staying out late, but when women do it is seen as disrespectful. According to Ciara, "it's a record for my women" and she had "a lot of girl talks". Ciara wanted to know what it would be like if "the roles were reversed". "It's a female-empowerment record". The protagonist wishes to "act like a boy". The song is notable for its mixture of synthesized orchestral strings and hard-pounding hip-hop instrumental. Ciara also co-produced the song along with The Evolution track "My Love". In February 2022, Kelly Rowland revealed that the song was initially written for her according to the writers and the producers of the track in a radio interview with MNEK on Apple Music.

== Critical reception and promotion ==
"Like a Boy" was well received by critics. Bill Lamb of About.com wrote that Ciara gives a "breathlessness delivering" and says the song is "intoxicating". Jody Rosen of Entertainment Weekly wrote the song is "par excellence" and "stirring revenge fantasy". Britain's Manchester Evening News published that the song has an "epic instrumental", "gymnastic style vocals", and "photocopied lyrics", but it is "guaranteed to be a smash hit in the U.S." Chocolate Magazine published it is "one of her best tracks so far" and shows her mature side.

YourSpins.com had a contest where fans had a chance to remix "Like a Boy" and meet Ciara, if the remix is saved. On April 3, 2007, Ciara made an appearance on the reality show Dancing with the Stars, where she performed "Like a Boy". She did her famous matrix in a pair of high heels. While the song was at the height of its popularity Ciara's name was featured in a Sprint campaign along with Joss Stone and My Chemical Romance. On June 26, 2007, Ciara performed a medley of "Like a Boy" and "That's Right" at the 2007 BET Awards.

== Chart performance ==
On the issue dated March 17, 2007, "Like a Boy" debuted on the US Billboard Hot 100 at number 81. On the issue dated May 5, 2007, the single reached its peak position at number 19 on the chart. The song spent a total of 20 weeks on the chart. The song also peaked at number 6 on the US Hot R&B/Hip-Hop Songs, giving Ciara her sixth top 10 single on the chart. The song was ranked at number 68 on the Billboard Year End singles of 2007, and is the most successful year-end single from the album. On September 6, 2019, the single was certified platinum by the Recording Industry Association of America (RIAA) for sales of over a million digital copies in the United States.

Internationally, the song achieved moderate success. In Sweden, the song debuted at number 19 and peaked at number 8 in its second week, becoming her first top 10 in the country. The song was also a top 10 hit in other countries, peaking at number 8 in Belgium and number 7 in Finland. The song peaked within the top 20 in multiple countries as well, peaking at number 11 in Ireland, number 16 in Switzerland, and at number 20 in France. In the United Kingdom, it debuted at number 35 from digital downloads alone. After the physical release, "Like a Boy" moved up twelve spots from number 28 to 16, which became its peak position in the country.

== Music video ==
The music video for "Like a Boy" was directed by Diane Martel (credited as Ms. D), who also directed Ciara's "Promise" video. It was shot in late January, over a three-day period and edited by Paul Martinez. The video premiered on Yahoo! Music and BET's Access Granted on February 21, 2007. The video received a "First Look" on MTV's TRL on February 23, 2007, and debuted at #10 on February 26, 2007, and peaked at #4. "Like a Boy" premiered on The Box on March 9, 2007. On March 8, 2007, it debuted on BET's 106 & Park at #8 and peaked at #1. It peaked at #5 on the iTunes video charts. The song made number 33 on BET's Top 100 Video Countdown of 2007.

The black-and-white video begins with Ciara dressed like a boy sitting in a chair. She is sporting temporary tattoos and says, "2007. Ladies, I think it's time to switch roles." Next, Ciara confronts her boyfriend played by football player Reggie Bush throughout the video. During the first verse and chorus, Ciara dances with her male alter ego. The rest of the video, Ciara and female dancers, who are all dressed in more masculine styles, perform masculine choreography against a plain background. After the bridge, there is a breakdown and Ciara performs her famous matrix as in the "Goodies" video. The video version of the song features different edits from the album version.

"Like a Boy" was nominated for "Best Choreography in a Video" (Choreog.-Jamaica Craft) at the 2007 MTV Video Music Awards, but the award was given to Justin Timberlake's "My Love" featuring T.I. The music video was also nominated for "Video of the Year" at the 2007 BET Awards, but lost to Beyoncé Knowles' "Irreplaceable." The video became widely popular, being viewed over 100 million times on VEVO, which is her most-viewed video.

== Formats and track listings ==
Digital download EP

1. "Like a Boy" (Main version) – 3:59
2. "Like a Boy" (Kardinal Beats) – 3:32
3. "Like a Boy" (Soul Seekerz remix) – 6:44

European CD #1 and digital download EP

1. "Like a Boy" [Main version] – 3:57
2. "Love You Better" [Main version] – 4:29
3. "Get Up" (featuring Chamillionaire) [Main version] – 4:22
4. "Get Up" (Moto Blanco Vocal mix) – 8:16

European CD #2 and iTunes digital download #1

1. "Like a Boy" – 3:59
2. "Get Up" [Moto Blanco Vocal mix] – 8:16

iTunes digital download #2

1. "Like a Boy" – 3:58

Promotional CD and iTunes digital download #3

1. "Like a Boy" [Main] – 4:00
2. "Like a Boy" [Instrumental] – 3:57

== Charts ==
=== Weekly charts ===
Chart (2007)	Peak position
Austria (Ö3 Austria Top 40)	47
Belgium (Ultratip Bubbling Under Flanders)	12
Belgium (Ultratip Bubbling Under Wallonia)	8
Canada CHR/Top 40 (Billboard)	37
European Hot 100 Singles (Billboard)	26
Finland (Suomen virallinen lista)	7
France (SNEP)	20
Germany (GfK)	29
Hungary (Rádiós Top 40)	34
Ireland (IRMA)	11
Italy (FIMI)	43
New Zealand (Recorded Music NZ)	29
Scottish Singles Sales (Official Charts)	10
Sweden (Sverigetopplistan)	8
Switzerland (Schweizer Hitparade)	16
UK Singles (Official Charts)	16
UK Hip Hop/R&B (Official Charts)	1
US Billboard Hot 100	19
US Dance Club Songs (Billboard)	23
US Dance Singles Sales (Billboard)	29
US Dance Airplay (Billboard)	10
US Hot R&B/Hip-Hop Songs (Billboard)	6
US Pop Airplay (Billboard)	18
US Rhythmic Airplay (Billboard)	6

=== Year-end charts ===
Chart (2007)	Position
Switzerland (Schweizer Hitparade)	78
UK Singles (OCC)	142
UK Urban (Music Week)	23
US Billboard Hot 100	68
US Hot R&B/Hip-Hop Songs (Billboard)	46
US Rhythmic (Billboard)	38

== Certifications ==
Region	Certification	Certified units/sales
New Zealand (RMNZ)	Gold	15,000^{‡}
United Kingdom (BPI)	Silver	200,000^{‡}
United States (RIAA) (Mastertone)	Gold	500,000^{^}
United States (RIAA)	Platinum	1,000,000^{‡}
^{^} Shipments figures based on certification alone.^{‡} Sales+streaming figures based on certification alone.

== Release history ==
Country	Release date
United States	February 13, 2007
Germany	March 30, 2007
United Kingdom	April 2, 2007
