= Jay-Z & Ciara Live =

2009 concert tour by Jay-Z and Ciara

- National tour by Jay-Z & Ciara
- Location: U.S., North America
- Associated album: The Blueprint 3; Fantasy Ride
- Start date: July 2, 2009
- End date: July 10, 2009
- Legs: 1
- No. of shows: 5 in North America
Jay-Z tour chronology
Heart of the City Tour (2008)	Jay-Z & Ciara Live (2009)	Jay-Z Fall Tour (2009–10)
Ciara tour chronology
Screamfest '07 (2007)	Jay-Z & Ciara Live (2009)	Jackie Tour (2015)

Jay-Z & Ciara Live (also known as Jay-Z Live with Special Guest Ciara), was a 2009 summer concert tour headlined by American rapper Jay-Z and American R&B singer Ciara. The tour was in support of both artists' new albums, The Blueprint 3 and Fantasy Ride. The six city United States tour took place from July 2 to July 12, 2009. The tour was originally scheduled to have ten dates, but this was later changed to six. The opening act for the tour was rapper Fabolous.

Ciara did not appear at the first tour date for an unknown reason, but she did appear at the second show at The Palms. The July 12 stop in Atlanta, Georgia was cancelled due to heavy rain.

== Setlist ==
Ciara

1. Intro
2. "Like a Boy"
3. "1, 2 Step"
4. "Love Sex Magic"
5. "Never Ever"
6. "Goodies"
7. "Oh"
8. "Promise"
9. "Work"
10. Outro
- On the Las Vegas stop, Ciara Performed "Like A Surgeon".
- Ciara missed the Connecticut stop on July 10 due to catching the flu.

== Tour dates ==
All tour dates were announced and confirmed on Ciara's official website.

Date	City	Country	Venue	Opening act
July 2, 2009	Phoenix	United States	Dodge Theater	Fabolous
July 3, 2009	Las Vegas	United States	The Pearl at The Palms	Fabolous
July 4, 2009	Las Vegas	United States	The Pearl at The Palms	Fabolous
July 7, 2009	Chicago	United States	Charter One Pavilion	Fabolous
July 10, 2009	Uncasville	United States	Mohegan Sun Arena	Fabolous

== Critical reception ==
The tour received positive to favorable reviews from critics.

Los Angeles Times gave the whole tour a very positive review, saying Ciara worked hard during her brief set, executing some impressive acrobatics along with her four dancers. Her street-tough image is powerful—she and her dancers wore ripped jeans and leather vests, like a sleeked-up girl gang—but her delivery was unfocused, and she didn't seem to be enjoying herself. And she also sang to tracks, and half the time she lip-synched. The newspaper also gave Jay-Z a positive review saying that his set was exciting and kept the audience very hyped. They also continued saying he interacted with audience very well. As, it's stated Jay-Z shows are fun because the rapper is so adept at spinning liquid gold; his mouth is one of the most nimble in the genre’s history, and he uses it to present thoughts that are sharp, funny and resonant
