= Jackie (Ciara album) =

2015 album by Ciara

Studio album by Ciara
- Released: May 1, 2015
- Recorded: 2013–2015
- Studios: Los Angeles (eightysevenfourteen studios); Hollywood (Chalice Studios; The Record Plant); New York (Sterling Sound); North Hollywood (Larrabee Sound; Underdog Studios); Virginia Beach (MixStar Studios)
- Genres: Pop; dance; R&B
- Length: 46:24
- Label: Epic
- Producers: Dr. Luke; Harmony "H-Money" Samuels; Polow Da Don; Cirkut; The Underdogs

Ciara chronology
Ciara (2013)	Jackie (2015)	Beauty Marks (2019)

Singles from Jackie
- 1. "I Bet" Released: January 26, 2015; 2. "Dance like We're Making Love" Released: June 30, 2015

Jackie is the sixth studio album by American singer Ciara, and was released on May 1, 2015, through Epic Records. Following her departure from her previous record label, and the release of her self-titled fifth studio album, Ciara embarked on a hiatus in order to focus on her relationship with American rapper Future, which provoked Ciara to start work on her sixth album which was predominantly inspired by her then-fiancé. In May 2014, Ciara gave birth to her first child and shortly thereafter called off the engagement. Following the public break-up, Ciara postponed the album and began to record new music, while concentrating on motherhood.

During the recording of the album, Ciara worked with numerous long time collaborators including Harmony "H-Money" Samuels and Polow da Don, as well as less frequent collaborators such as Dr. Luke and Cirkut. The producers' efforts resulted in a predominantly pop and R&B album that took influence from hip hop, dance-pop, house, electropop, trap, drum and bass, and 1990s R&B, with lyrics that revolve around themes of love, betrayal, and motherhood. Entitled after her mother, Ciara called upon numerous artists to be featured on Jackie, including Pitbull and Missy Elliott.

Upon release, Jackie was met with a mixed reception from music critics. The album peaked at number 17 on the US Billboard 200, with just 25,000 album-equivalent units. It was preceded by the release of the lead single, "I Bet", which debuted at number 96 on the US Billboard Hot 100, peaking at number 43. The album was further promoted by a second single, "Dance like We're Making Love", and Ciara embarked upon the Jackie Tour.

== Background ==
Following her departure from her previous record label, Ciara signed a new deal with Epic Records, and released her self-titled fifth studio album in July 2013. In late January 2014, Ciara premiered a live version of a song entitled "Anytime" at the Degree Women Grammys Celebration in Los Angeles. On February 2, 2014, Ciara premiered the studio version produced by Boi-1da and Katalyst, featuring her then-boyfriend and rapper Future. After her engagement to Future, Ciara revealed to W in April 2014 that her sixth studio album would be predominantly inspired by her then-fiancé. Ciara gave birth to her first child in May 2014. After claims of Future's infidelity during their relationship had surfaced, it was reported that the couple's engagement had been called off. Following their very public break-up, Ciara's album release was further postponed to 2015, and during this time the singer "quietly" recorded new music, while concentrating on motherhood.

== Recording and production ==
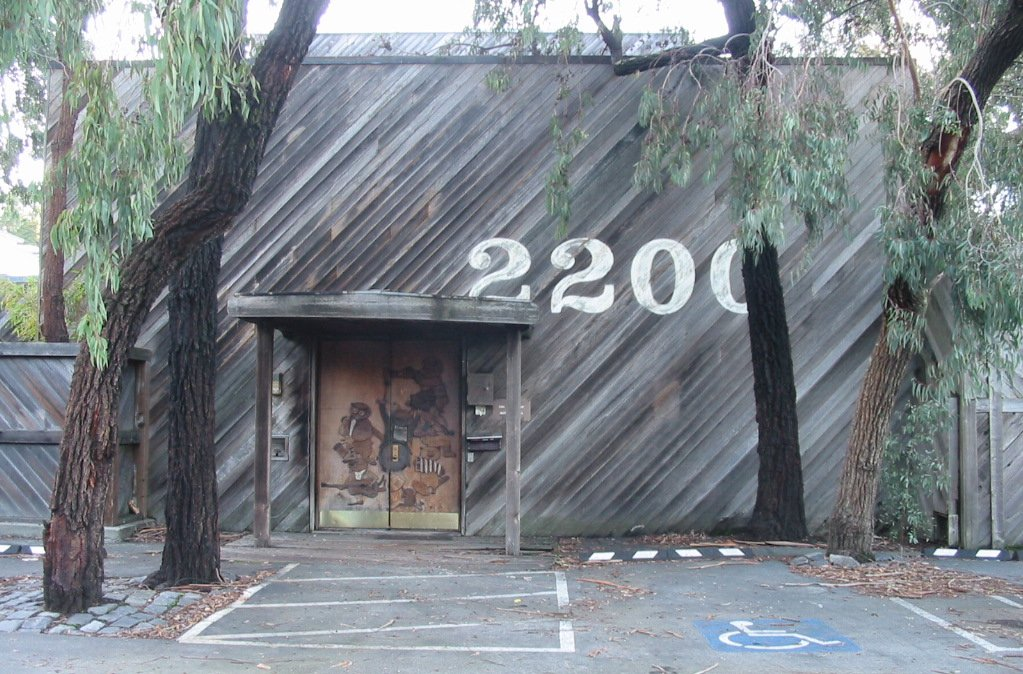
The Record Plant (Hollywood, California) was one of the studios where the album was recorded.

In September 2013, producer Mike WILL Made-It revealed that Ciara had begun work on her sixth studio album. In December 2013, Ciara confirmed she was in the process of making a new album. During an interview with Rap-Up magazine, Ciara revealed that recording for her sixth album began around Thanksgiving of 2013 and she would be releasing new music "really soon". While discussing the album's direction, she claimed: "Sonically I am so content; I had my dream team of producers who I always wanted to work with." In August 2014, Ciara posted on her Instagram account a photo of herself and American record producer Dr. Luke, suggesting they were working on new songs for the album. In another photo, she wrote: "We [are] having an amazing time, making classic music." Luke previous worked with Ciara on the track "Tell Me What Your Name Is" for her third studio album Fantasy Ride (2009).

In October 2014, Ciara posted a photo of her and record producer Polow da Don, who previously worked with her on her 2006 hit "Promise" and on 2009's "Never Ever". In December 2014, she went back to work with Luke, posting another photo along with Epic Records CEO L.A. Reid, teasing the fans with the caption, "Wait 'til u hear what's cooking it's worth the wait." It was rumoured that Luke produced two songs, "Dance like We're Making Love" and "Give Me Love," which was later confirmed. Ciara also worked with American songwriter Diane Warren, she stated: "Warren is a legendary writer. A legendary person. You're going to remember every bit of the session you have with her. She's so vocal – you know that you're with someone who knows what she's doing." In January 2015, it was announced that Ciara was "putting the finishing touches on the lead single with Harmony Samuels." Other producers such as The Underdogs, Lunchmoney Lewis and songwriter Ester Dean also contributed to the album.

== Composition ==
=== Writing and inspiration ===
"I was able to get the best of both worlds – an urban pop-slash-R&B-hip-hop record. I had the sound and producers that I wanted, because I had a specific vision. [...] I think that Dr. Luke, Harmony and Polow were the ones who helped see me through my vision. I was very specific."

— Ciara, speaking on her alter ego Super C.

In an interview for L'Uomo Vogue, Ciara revealed about the album: "It will be an authentic album, real. I talk openly and honestly about my emotions as a woman, mother, about my ambitions, but also my vulnerability, my happy moments and my sad moments." Later, Ciara revealed that the album was going to be called "Jackie" – the name of her mom – since she "felt like it was the best title for where I am in my life right now. Being a mom, I can now see the world through her eyes and fully understand what she was thinking. Being a mom has changed me forever." The singer also commented about the difference between Jackie and her other albums, stating: "I am so much more expressive and confident than I have ever been in my life. Even though there has been musical and personal growth, this album really takes me back in time, to when I didn’t overthink the creative process. Before, I would have said 'Goodies' was my favorite album, but now I believe 'Jackie' is my best body of work." Regarding its sounds, Ciara defined as "urban pop-slash-R&B-hip-hop record." Ciara also spoke about the overall themes of the album, commenting: "Not every song on this album is super autobiographical, but at the heart of it all, it talks about things that are real. Every song is needed, though I felt like ["I Bet"] really stood out because of the timing, with how I wanted to tell my story with my music. I felt like it connected with people, like when I was in the same room with L.A. Reid and Harmony, looking at this list of songs. Music is, really, a way for people to draw some form of strength. You never know what a song can do for someone."

=== Songs ===
The album opens with "Jackie (B.M.F.)" an uptempo trap and drum and bass song with lyrics about "birthing a nine-pound, 10-ounce baby" and "concluding that she's 'a bad motherf**ker.'" The next track, the synth-driven, electro-lite "That's How I'm Feelin'", was considered a "finger-snapping, girls-night-out track" and it features American rappers Pitbull and Missy Elliott – who previously worked with Ciara on "1, 2 Step", "Lose Control" and "Work". "Lullaby" was labelled a "dance-friendly," "old-school bass track," that uses a metaphor "that's unbecoming of a new mom to put her new man to bed tonight." The fourth track "Dance like We're Making Love" was named a sultry and sensual midtempo pop song that has been compared to Janet Jackson. "Stuck on You" is a pop song, where Ciara uses a "brash, unapologetic and borderline cocky" tone.

"Fly" has "'80s electro sample" and a "zwurpingly odd Squarepusher chords", with lyrics where Ciara insists that both her and a former lover should find happiness elsewhere." The seventh track "I Bet" is an R&B track with lyrical content that are based on subjects of betrayal. It features "liquid acoustic guitar and snapping drums" and co-author Theron Thomas' Migos-like vocal interjections." "Give Me Love" is an EDM and a house song where her voice ventures into "deeper, smoother levels and tones," while the pop "Kiss & Tell" was defined as a "Nile Rodgers-esque retro-soul bounce with lyrics about keeping secrets. "All Good" was named a "disco-lite" and bubblegum pop song, while "Only One" was considered a pop ballad. The dance-pop "One Woman Army", a song written as the title track to the scrapped project of the same name, has "fizzy synths and club sirens" and robo-military march. Lyrically, it is an ode to doing it yourself. The album's regular edition closes with "I Got You", a lullaby for Ciara's year-old son, Future Jr."

== Release and promotion ==
On January 14, 2015, Ciara announced the title of her album would be "Jackie" via her official Twitter account. Then in March 2015, Ciara announced that she would release Jackie in May 2015 and that she planned on touring the US later in the year. The album is titled after her mother, stating, "I can now see the world through her eyes and I know what it's like to be a mom... I am a mini Jackie and it's that simple."

=== Live performances ===
Ciara performed "I Bet" on Live! with Kelly and Michael on April 3, 2015, and during the BET Black Girls Rock! special on April 5, 2015. She performed the "I Bet (R3hab Remix)" with producer, R3hab, at the Coachella Music Festival on April 18, 2015, as well as the song, "Baby Get Up", which will appear on R3hab's upcoming compilation album. On April 24, 2015, Ciara premiered a video snippet for the album's sixth track, "Fly", on social media site, Instagram; the video was filmed by Taylor Cut Films. She went on to premiere video snippets for the album's other tracks, "Give Me Love" and "One Woman Army (Intro)" in the following days. On May 8, 2015, a music video was released for "I Got You" in honor of Mothers Day.

=== Jackie Tour ===
Jackie Tour
- Tour by Ciara
- Promotional poster for the tour
- Associated album: Jackie
- Start date: May 3, 2015
- End date: June 5, 2015
- No. of shows: 19 in North America

Ciara concert chronology
- Jay-Z & Ciara Live (2009); Jackie Tour (2015); Beauty Marks Tour (2019)

The North American tour dates were announced March 2015. It consisted of 19 shows solely in the United States. In October, Harris announced a second US leg to be sponsored by Topshop. It included dates in Canada. These dates were later postponed to March and April 2016. Ultimately, the tour dates were cancelled. The concert in Silver Springs, Maryland was streamed live via Yahoo! Screen in partnership with Live Nation.

Speaking on the tour, Ciara stated:

"I am so excited about this tour. It has been almost 6 years since my last tour. I feel this album is my best body of work. It is important to me that my fans have the greatest show experience possible. On the Jackie tour, fans will get a chance to know me more intimately, jam to good music, and most importantly be entertained. I can not wait!"

=== Set list ===
The following setlist was obtained from the concert held on May 30, 2015, at Club Nokia in Los Angeles, California. It does not represent all concerts for the duration of the tour.

1. "Jackie (B.M.F.)"
2. "Oh" (contains elements of "All Day")
3. "That's How I'm Feelin'"
4. "1, 2 Step"
5. "Stuck On You"
6. "Dance Like We're Making Love"
7. "Cherish the Day"
8. "Promise"
9. "One Woman Army" (interlude)
10. "Like a Boy"
11. "Get Up" (contains elements of "Billie Jean")
12. "All Good" / "So What" / "Like You"
13. "Lose Control"
14. "Ride"
15. "Pony"
16. "Lullaby"
17. "Body Party" (contains elements of "I Run It")
18. "I'm Out"
19. "I Will Survive"
20. "I Bet"
21. "Goodies"
22. "I Got You"
23. "Give Me Love"

=== Tour dates ===
Dates and venues for the Jackie Tour
Date	City	Country	Venue
May 3, 2015	Chicago	United States	House of Blues
May 5, 2015	New York City	United States	Best Buy Theater
May 7, 2015	Boston	United States	House of Blues
May 9, 2015	Silver Spring	United States	The Fillmore Silver Spring
May 10, 2015	Glenside	United States	Keswick Theatre
May 12, 2015	Charlotte	United States	The Fillmore Charlotte
May 13, 2015	Atlanta	United States	Center Stage Theater
May 15, 2015	Miami	United States	The Fillmore Miami Beach
May 16, 2015	Tampa	United States	The Ritz Ybor
May 19, 2015	New Orleans	United States	Joy Theater
May 20, 2015	Houston	United States	House of Blues
May 22, 2015	Dallas	United States	House of Blues
May 23, 2015	San Antonio	United States	Aztec Theatre
May 24, 2015	Corpus Christi	United States	Brewster Street Ice House
May 27, 2015	San Diego	United States	House of Blues
May 29, 2015	Riverside	United States	Riverside Municipal Auditorium
May 30, 2015	Los Angeles	United States	Club Nokia
May 31, 2015	San Francisco	United States	Regency Ballroom
June 5, 2015	Las Vegas	United States	Drai's

== Singles ==
"I Bet" was released as the official lead single from the album on January 26, 2015 in the United States. It officially impacted Rhythmic and Urban contemporary radio in the US the following day. The "I Bet" music video made its television premiere on Extra on March 9, 2015, followed by an immediate release to Vevo and YouTube. On April 24, 2015, Rap-Up magazine reported that the Pitbull and Missy Elliott collab, "That's How I'm Feelin'", would be released as Jackie's second single. Three days later, however, it was announced via Ciara's official social media accounts that "Dance Like We're Making Love" would serve as the album's second single instead. "Dance like We're Making Love" was then made available as a digital download on April 28, 2015, in the United States, along with the pre-order of the album. Following the announcement that "Dance like We're Making Love" would serve as the album's second single, "Give Me Love" was given an official US urban contemporary impact date of June 9, 2015. A new audio upload of "Give Me Love" featuring the official single cover, was uploaded to Ciara's Vevo account following the single's announcement. However, on June 4, Ciara confirmed herself that the aforementioned "Dance like We're Making Love" would be issued as the album's second single as previously planned. The song impacted US urban contemporary radio on June 30, 2015.

== Critical reception ==
Professional ratings
Review scores
Source	Rating
AllMusic	2.5/5 stars
Billboard	2/5 stars
Complex	2/5 stars
Exclaim!	7/10
Idolator	3/5 stars
New York Daily News	positive
Pitchfork	6.8/10
Spin	8/10
Time	positive
Vibe	favorable

Jackie received mixed reviews from music critics. At Metacritic, which assigns a normalized rating out of 100 to reviews from mainstream critics, the album received an average score of 60, which indicates "mixed or average reviews", based on 8 reviews. Nolan Feeney of Time noted that "'Jackie' rivals 2013's self-titled quasi-comeback as Ciara's most consistent and self-assured record to date." Feeney also approved the album for featuring "her most adventurous production", noting that "nearly every song on the record feels like a companion to at least one other proven track in her back catalog." In a positive note, Jon Caramanica of The New York Times claimed that "'Jackie' is among Ciara's strongest albums, and her most varied." Writing for New York Daily News, Jim Farber claimed that the album "features the most upbeat, and fun, music of Ciara's career." Ian Gittins of Virgin Media described it as "a triumph, an orgy of luscious, sharp-witted R&B and sumptuous soul assembled by a crack team of producers." Dan Weiss of Spin found out that "the strong-heeled 'Jackie' is far from conservative, and possibly more daring, with three of the year's best songs at the very top, middle, and bottom ('Jackie [B.M.F.],' 'I Bet,' 'One Woman Army'), which couldn't be more different from each other." Eyan B. Patrick of Exclaim! named it "a solidly produced effort that features an artist comfortable with who she is both privately and as an artist."

Anupa Mistry of Pitchfork called the album "a serviceable record that gets better with multiple listens", but remarked that "it hints at a storyline, but doesn't go deeper" [...] "[W]hat would've given her the edge that her peers maintain is some insight behind Ciara's redemption songs." Idolator's Christina Lee echoed the same sentiment, stating: "Instead of expanding on how her life has changed, though, Jackie finds Ciara settling into her comfort zone. These songs are good fun, though they aren’t as revelatory or forward-thinking as ‘Body Party’ or the rest of 2013's Ciara, the best album she's made." Stacy Ann-Ellis of Vibe also noted that "[s]onically, it feels all over the place and by album's end, there's no clear cut takeaway message," but ensured that "there are still more positives than negatives to be found on 'Jackie'." Michael Arceneaux of Complex was unsure about Ciara's personality on the album, declaring that she "doesn't know who she wants to be on her new album." In a less enthusiastic review, Andy Kellman of AllMusic wrote that "[t]he album contains fewer highlights than any previous Ciara album," concluding that "the results are mixed." Steven J. Horowitz of Billboard felt that the album was "oddly impersonal" and "a missed opportunity for a talented artist to connect with fans in a new way."

== Commercial performance ==
The album debuted at number 17 on the US Billboard 200 chart with 25,000 album-equivalent units (19,900 in sales) and had the lowest first-week sales amongst her first six albums. Its sales placed it at number 13 on the Top Album Sales chart.

== Track listing ==
Credits adapted from liner notes and iTunes.

Jackie — Standard edition
No.	Title	Writer(s)	Producer(s)	Length
1.	"Jackie (B.M.F.)"	Ciara Harris; Harmony "H-Money" Samuels; Gamal Lewis; Chloe Angelides	Samuels; Chris "Tek" O'Ryan^{[a]}	5:28
2.	"That's How I'm Feelin'" (featuring Pitbull and Missy Elliott)	Ester Dean; Jamal Jones; Armando C. Perez; Melissa Elliott; Larry Linn; Matty Kats	Polow da Don; O'Ryan^{[a]}	3:58
3.	"Lullaby"	Harris; Lukasz Gottwald; Lewis; Theron Thomas; Henry Walter; Kenneth Gamble; Bunny Sigler; Cornell Haynes Jr.; Antoine Macon	Dr. Luke; Cirkut; O'Ryan^{[a]}	3:46
4.	"Dance like We're Making Love"	Harris; Gottwald; Theron Thomas; Timothy Thomas; Walter	Dr. Luke; Cirkut; Ciara^{[a]}	4:16
5.	"Stuck on You"	Harris; Samuels; Edgar "JV" Etienne; Theron Thomas	Samuels; O'Ryan^{[a]}	4:10
6.	"Fly"	Rachel Assil; Jones	Polow da Don; O'Ryan^{[a]}	4:06
7.	"I Bet"	Harris; Samuels; Timothy Thomas; Theron Thomas	Samuels; O'Ryan^{[a]}	4:47
8.	"Give Me Love"	Harris; Gottwald; Jacob Kasher Hindlin; Lewis; Theron Thomas; Walter	Dr. Luke; Cirkut	3:20
9.	"Kiss & Tell"	Gottwald; Theron Thomas; Walter	Dr. Luke; Cirkut; O'Ryan^{[a]}	3:43
10.	"One Woman Army"	Harvey Mason Jr.; Damon Thomas; Ali Tamposi; Livvi Franc	The Underdogs	3:54
11.	"I Got You"	Diane Warren	Samuels; Harris^{[b]}; O'Ryan^{[a]}	4:56
Total length:				46:24

Jackie – Deluxe edition (bonus tracks)
No.	Title	Writer(s)	Producer(s)	Length
10.	"All Good"	Theron Thomas; Timothy Thomas	Polow da Don; O'Ryan^{[a]}	3:39
11.	"Only One"	Harris; Angelides; Timothy Thomas; Saul Alexander Castillo Vasquez	A.C.; O'Ryan^{[a]}	3:31
12.	"One Woman Army (Intro)"	Samuels	Samuels; O'Ryan^{[a]}	0:54
13.	"One Woman Army"	Mason; D. Thomas; Tamposi; Franc	The Underdogs	3:54
14.	"I Got You"	Warren	Samuels; Harris^{[b]}; O'Ryan^{[a]}	4:56
15.	"I Bet" (Remix) (featuring Joe Jonas)	Harris; Samuels; Timothy Thomas; Theron Thomas; Joe Jonas	Samuels; O'Ryan^{[a]}	4:47
16.	"I Bet" (R3hab Remix)	Harris; Samuels; Timothy Thomas; Theron Thomas	Samuels; O'Ryan^{[a]}; R3hab^{[c]}	3:28
Total length:				62:44

Jackie — Japan edition (bonus tracks)
No.	Title	Writer(s)	Producer(s)	Length
17.	"I Bet" (Remix) (featuring T.I.)	Harris; Samuels; Timothy Thomas; Theron Thomas	Samuels; O'Ryan^{[a]}	3:53
Total length:				46:24

Notes

- ^{^[a]} signifies a vocal producer
- ^{^[b]} signifies a co-producer
- ^{^[c]} signifies a remixer
- "Jackie (B.M.F)" contains a sample from "Amen, Brother", as performed by The Winstons.
- "That's How I'm Feelin'" contains a sample from "Jive Rhythm Trx – 122 BPM", as written by Larry Linn and performed by Willedson Dodgers.
- "Lullaby" contains elements of "Love, Need and Want You" written by Kenneth Gamble and Bunny Sigler and contains samples and portions of "Dilemma" written by Cornell Haynes Jr.

== Charts ==
=== Weekly charts ===
Chart (2015)	Peak position
Australian Albums (ARIA)	53
Belgian Albums (Ultratop Flanders)	136
Belgian Albums (Ultratop Wallonia)	134
Scottish Albums (Official Charts)	82
South Korean Albums (Circle)	80
UK Albums (Official Charts)	46
UK R&B Albums (Official Charts)	6
US Billboard 200	17
US Top R&B/Hip-Hop Albums (Billboard)	2

=== Year-end charts ===
Chart (2015)	Position
US Top R&B/Hip-Hop Albums (Billboard)	77

== Release history ==
List of release dates, showing region, formats, label, editions and reference
Region	Date	Format(s)	Label	Edition(s)	Ref.
Germany	May 1, 2015	CD; digital download	Sony Music	Deluxe	
Canada	May 4, 2015	CD; digital download	Sony Music	Deluxe	
United Kingdom	May 4, 2015	CD; digital download	RCA	Deluxe	
United States	May 4, 2015	CD; digital download	Epic	Standard; Deluxe	
Portugal	May 4, 2015	CD; digital download	Sony Music	Deluxe	
Australia	May 8, 2015	CD; digital download	Sony Music	Deluxe	
Japan	May 27, 2015	CD	Sony Music	Bonus track	
