= Dance like We're Making Love =

Single by Ciara

from the album Jackie
- Released: June 30, 2015
- Recorded: 2014–2015
- Genre: Pop; R&B
- Length: 4:19
- Label: Epic
- Songwriters: Ciara Harris; Lukasz Gottwald; Theron Thomas; Timothy Thomas; Henry Walter
- Producers: Dr. Luke; Cirkut

Ciara singles chronology
"I Bet" (2015)	"Dance like We're Making Love" (2015)	"Get Up" (2016)

Music video
- "Dance Like We're Making Love" on YouTube

"Dance like We're Making Love" is a song by American singer Ciara from her sixth studio album, Jackie (2015). It was written by Ciara, Lukasz Gottwald, Theron Thomas, Timothy Thomas, and Henry Walter, and produced by Dr. Luke and Cirkut. While working on the album, Ciara contacted Luke to work with her once again since she wanted to work with her dream team of producers. Together, they did three songs, with "Dance Like We're Making Love" being recorded while Ciara was pregnant with her first child. Released on iTunes as a free download, one week prior to the album's release, "Dance Like We're Making Love" was announced as the album's second single on April 28, 2015. However, "Give Me Love" gained radio release date, as well as its audio and cover was uploaded on her VEVO account, suggesting that it would be the second single, but eventually Ciara confirmed "Dance Like We're Making Love" as the official second single and Epic Records serviced it to US urban contemporary radio on June 30, 2015.

"Dance Like We're Making Love" is a midtempo pop song, with its instrumentation consisting of finger-snapping drum beats, sparse 808s and EDM synths, while Ciara delivers a breathy voice - which was compared to Janet Jackson's. Described as a "baby-making jam", lyrically the song talks about sex and seducing someone, suggesting her flame to dance as the same way people make love. The song received generally positive reviews from the majority of music critics, who praised its sensual beats and the singer's vocals, while also highlighting its big hook and catchy chorus. Its accompanying music video, directed by Dave Meyers, was released on July 16, 2015 and was said to be Ciara's favorite music video so far. It depicts Ciara showing her physique while suspended over a pool and showcasing sensual dance moves alongside dancer Aakomon Jones. Critics commended the video for being massive, sultry and one of her sexiest videos of her career. The song has charted on the Billboard Hot 100 chart for a week, while experiencing moderate success on its component charts, Hot R&B/Hip-Hop Songs and Hot R&B Songs, reaching the top-ten on the latter.

== Background and release ==
While working on her then upcoming album, Ciara posted on her Instagram account a photo of herself and American record producer Dr. Luke, suggesting they were working on new songs for the album. In another photo, she wrote: "We [are] having an amazing time, making classic music." Luke has previous worked with Ciara on the track "Tell Me What Your Name Is" for her third studio album Fantasy Ride (2009). While discussing the album's direction, she claimed: "Sonically I am so content; I had my dream team of producers who I always wanted to work with." In December 2014, she went back to work with him again, posting another photo along with Epic Records CEO L.A. Reid, teasing the fans with the caption, "Wait 'til [you] hear what's cooking it's worth the wait." It was rumoured that Luke produced two songs, "Dance Like We're Making Love" and "Give Me Love," which was later confirmed.

On April 28, 2015, one week before the release of the album, Ciara shared "Dance Like We're Making Love" in celebration of its release week and claiming that the song was unlocked on iTunes and that it was one of her favorite songs on the album. At the time website Rap-Up, had announced "That's How I'm Feeling" as the second single. However, "Give Me Love", another Dr. Luke-produced track, was given an official US urban contemporary impact date of June 9, 2015, as well as its audio upload on her VEVO account, also featuring the official single cover, but on June 4, 2015, Ciara confirmed herself that the aforementioned "Dance Like We're Making Love" would be issued as the album's second single as previously planned. Therefore, the audio along with its cover art - which was the same used for "Give Me Love" - was uploaded on her VEVO account and it finally impacted US urban contemporary radio on June 30, 2015.

== Composition ==
"Dance Like We're Making Love" was written by Ciara Harris, Lukasz Gottwald, Theron Thomas, Timothy Thomas and Henry Walter, with production being done by Dr. Luke and Cirkut. Luke and Cirkut were also responsible for providing instruments and programming. Chloe Angelides provided the backing vocals. It was recorded at Eightysevenfourteen Studios (Los Angeles, California) and The Record Plant (Hollywood, California), while Ciara was pregnant with her first child, Future. It is a mid tempo pop song that lasts 4 minutes and 16 seconds and has a tempo of 96 beats per minute. Billboard described the track as "bedroom-ready [song] with sparse 808s and snaps all topped by [her] eternally breathy voice," while Vibe felt the song is a "sultry, pop reprise of 'Too Close', Next's ode to sensual dancing." Caitlin White remarked that the song is "a restrained, adult perspective that veers away from pop and hip-hop in favor of EDM-ready drops." Lyrically, "Dance Like We're Making Love" was described by Rap-Up as a "baby-making jam [...] about getting it on with her man", while Mariah Sherman of Fuse defined it as "a makeup (or makeout!) jam." She continued: "'Cause once I'm turned on, you can't turn me off,' she sings before launching into a repetitive chorus of 'Let's dance like we're making love'." As noted by Nolan Feeney of Time, Dr. Luke production "sensually draws out its 'lo-o-uh-uh-o-ove' hook without sounding too pornographic."

== Critical reception ==
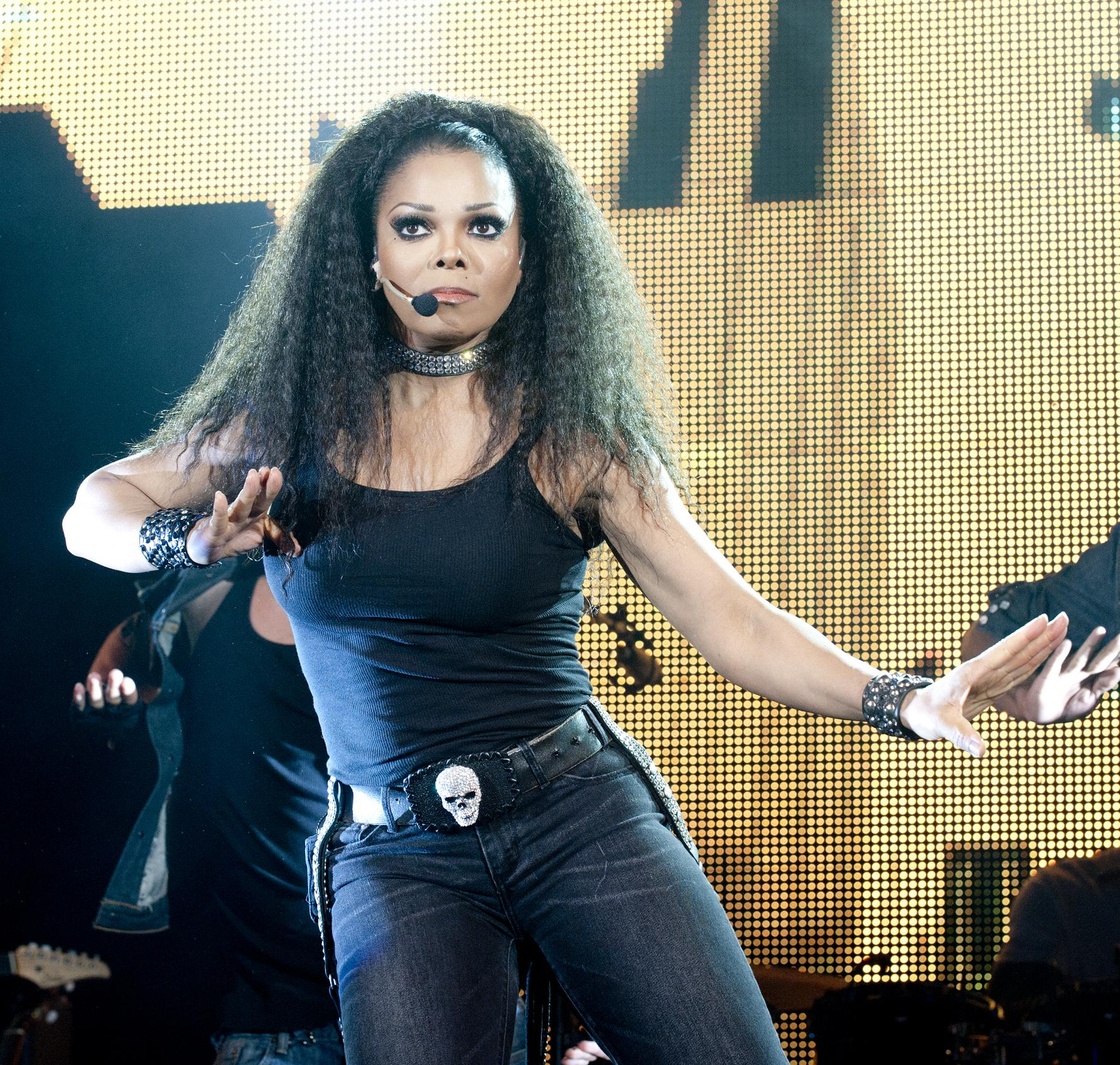
Some critics suggested that the song is reminiscent of the music done by Janet Jackson - one of Ciara's main inspirations.

The song received mainly positive reviews from music critics. Andy Kellman of AllMusic selected the song as one of the album's best tracks, while Natalie Wiener of Billboard noted that on the song "[s]he's playing to her strengths here -- that is, dancing." Caitlin White of Stereogum claimed that Ciara " returned to sex goddess mode" on the track, calling it "an icy, spare take on a hook-up anthem." James Grebey of Spin praised the track, naming it "smooth, giving each note as much space as it needs and leaving lots of room for the listener's mind to wander in steamy ways." In a similar analysis, Ariana Bacle of Entertainment Weekly declared the song is "sensual, snap-heavy, and sure to soon be playing out of many a bedroom speaker." Bianca Gracie of Idolator wrote the track is a "bedroom romp that finds the artist seducing her lover over a slinky, finger-snapping beat — which is all reminiscent of a young Janet Jackson." Christina Lee of the same publication agreed, declaring that "[w]ith her soft, barely-there vocals taking center stage in 'Dance Like We're Making Love,' Ciara can be mistaken for Janet Jackson."

Anupa Mistry of Pitchfork named it "a gorgeous, sleek midtempo track, similar to Frank Ocean's 'Novacane' but with a bigger, airier hook," while John Kennedy of BET labeled it "the type of horny heater that might inspire some bad decisions in a dim nightclub given the right (or wrong?) number of Henny shots." Dan Weiss of Spin noted that both "Dance Like We're Making Love" and "Give Me Love" are "as positive about hooks as they are about sex." Dee Lockett, writing for Vulture, described it as "a summer scorcher meant for getting turnt up and turned on in the club." Josiah Hughes of Exclaim! praised the "dynamic blend of finger-snapping drum beats and epic EDM synths," while noting that the track "got all the rhythmic properties of a classic Ciara hit, and a catchy (if repetitive) chorus to boot." Maggie Malach of Pop Crush opined that the "club-ready jam [...] makes us want to start dancing at our desks. Given the singer's fierce moves and willingness to push the envelope, it's no surprise that this sultry song completely embodies its provocative title." Malach also praised the fact that "the steam factor is at an all-time high with this one, as Ciara confidently tells us what's what." In contrast, Michael Arceneaux of Complex remarked that the song "sounds pretty but not remotely distinct."

== Music video ==
The accompanying music video for the song was filmed in June 2015 and was directed by acclaimed director Dave Meyers. Prior to its release, the singer posted a few teasers on her social media accounts, before it fully premiered on July 16, 2015 in New York City's Times Square. Ciara said of the video: "For the video I really wanted to challenge myself, and I'm lucky I got to work with Dave Meyers. The choreography is really fresh also, and I got to do some of my signature moves." It features choreographer Aakomon Jones as Ciara's dance partner and co-star. According to Declan Eytan from Forbes, the video "is high on fashion, as much as it is on choreography." Regarding its concept, she explained:

"The treatment is really a storytelling video. Basically I'm a temptress and a siren, and I'm sending my call out, I'm putting out my pheromones, I'm putting my potion in the air. I'm luring in this guy… I'm casting a spell and I'm putting him into a dream world and taking him on this high, and it's kinda like you never really get me."

=== Synopsis ===
The video "opens with the singer floating in a pool, [with] her ripped white T-shirt clinging to her body, [while s]he drips water on herself as she grooves to the music," as noticed by US Weekly's Madeline Boardman. Later, "Ciara changes from her pool outfit into gorgeous evening gowns and a lace bodysuit. Whipping out her famous dance moves, she is soon joined by two surprise guests: a lion and a hunky male love interest," continued Boardman. As the video continues, "Ciara romances a male guest in a massive villa overlooking Los Angeles, dominating each room with sexual energy", Billboard's Colin Stutz noted, "before she all but literally vanishes into thin air," completed Pop Crush's Erica Russell. Inside the manor, as punctuated by Russell, "things only get hotter, [and] Ciara treats the luxe mansion like her own personal love-pad, writhing on the floor in one room while wearing nothing but periwinkle-hued lace lingerie, and seducing her love interest with a sensual dance—and a [...] black gown—in another." The video is "wrapped up with a shot of Ciara walking down a hallway headed to the bedroom, tearing off her jewelry and dress along the way before turning and striking a 'come hither' pose, nude in the shadows," he concluded.

=== Reception ===
The video received a positive response from general media. Stutz of Billboard called the whole production "pretty massive, [where] she shows off some of her best moves in high heels and revealing outfits, suggesting dancing with her might be almost just as good as the real deal." Bruna Nessif of E! Online wrote that Ciara "proved once again that she's top of the line with [the] music video," citing that "Ciara delivers a nice mix of sultry sex appeal by flaunting her best assets in revealing outfits that accentuate her enviable figure, while also performing some impressive choreography. Of course, her dancing has always been one of her biggest highlights, but we never get used to it." Rap-Up magazine called it "steamy", while Boardman of US Weekly called it "steamy" and "sexy". Dee Lockett of Vulture claimed that the video "might just be the sexiest thing she's ever done — and that includes 'Ride' and 'Body Party'."

== Charts ==
Chart (2015)	Peak position
Canada Hot 100 (Billboard)	83
France (SNEP)	199
US Billboard Hot 100	100
US Hot R&B/Hip-Hop Songs (Billboard)	28
