= Love Sex Magic =

2009 single by Ciara featuring Justin Timberlake

Single by Ciara featuring Justin Timberlake

from the album Fantasy Ride
- B-side: "Go Girl"
- Released: March 3, 2009
- Recorded: 2008
- Studio: Henson Studios (Los Angeles)
- Genre: R&B; dance-pop; Electro-funk
- Length: 3:40
- Label: LaFace
- Songwriters: Justin Timberlake; James Fauntleroy; Robin Tadross; Mike Elizondo
- Producers: The Y's; Mike Elizondo

Ciara singles chronology
"Never Ever" (2009)	"Love Sex Magic" (2009)	"Work" (2009)

Justin Timberlake singles chronology
"Dead and Gone" (2009)	"Love Sex Magic" (2009)	"Carry Out" (2009)

Music video
- "Love Sex Magic" on YouTube

"Love Sex Magic" is a song by American singer Ciara from her third studio album, Fantasy Ride (2009). Featuring fellow American recording artist Justin Timberlake, the song was written by Timberlake and his production team The Y's and Mike Elizondo. The Y's and Elizondo also produced the track. The song was released as the lead single from Fantasy Ride internationally and was the second single from the album released in the United States, on March 3, 2009.

The song reveals a complete departure from Ciara's previous style, neither a sensual ballad nor incorporating Crunk&B influences. It embraces an electro sound also strongly incorporating funk music via a retro 1970s-style guitar presence and also elements of disco and soul music. Many critics noted the similarities between the song and music on Timberlake's album FutureSex/LoveSounds (2006). Critics gave the song mixed reviews, complimenting the song's funk and retro feel and the chemistry present between Ciara and Timberlake. The song would later go on to be nominated for Best Pop Collaboration with Vocals at the 52nd Grammy Awards.

"Love Sex Magic" peaked at number ten on the US Billboard Hot 100, becoming Ciara's fifth top ten hit as a lead artist, her eighth including features, and her first since "Get Up" in 2006. Outside of the United States, the song peaked within the top ten of the charts in Australia, Canada, France, Germany, New Zealand, the Republic of Ireland, Sweden, Switzerland, and the United Kingdom. The music video also exhibits a retro feel inspired by the Crazy Horse cabaret show and features Timberlake, Ciara, and several different kinds of foreplay, as well as Ciara dancing. For its routines it was nominated for Best Choreography at the 2009 MTV Video Music Awards. Ciara has performed the song on television a number of times, including on The Ellen DeGeneres Show and with Timberlake on Saturday Night Live.

== Background ==
I was very excited about sprinkling that flavor on the album, because this record is about sharing the many sides of me and I wanted to make sure there was something for everybody on it and that record is another reflection of where I'm at [right now].

— Ciara on inclusion of "Love Sex Magic" on Fantasy Ride

A song entitled "Magic," performed by Justin Timberlake, leaked online in November 2008. In February 2009, Rap-Up reported that Ciara and Timberlake had recorded a new duet for her then-upcoming album, Fantasy Ride. The final version of the song, initially titled "Love and Sex and Magic," featured Timberlake dueting with Ciara. Eventually known as "Love Sex Magic," the song was written by Timberlake, Mike Elizondo, and Timberlake's production team The Y's—James Fauntleroy, Timberlake, and Rob Knox. Timberlake wanted to create a song that both genders could relate to. The Y's and Elizondo produced the song. Ciara said that her collaboration with Timberlake was one of the best of her career, because they actually collaborated in the studio, rather than him being added as a guest feature after the initial recording. She explained, "I actually went into the studio to make the record from scratch, or he had the record there for me, but us being together was a very rare case I've had over the years." Ciara enjoyed her time with Timberlake, and valued the opportunity to work with him as an "artist and producer." She also noted how passionate Timberlake was about his work, and mentioned his humbleness and positive attitude.

== Composition ==
"Love Sex Magic"
A sample of "Love Sex Magic" featuring vocals from Ciara and Justin Timberlake. A "funky, 70s" guitar is present, giving the song a retro sound. Vocal moans from Timberlake are also heard.

With "Love Sex Magic," Ciara moved in a more pop direction than her past music. Jordan Sargent of PopMatters noted that while a pop fan might see the singer "back in her mind creatively," a Ciara fan would see the song as "signal[ing] the end of the singer's career as it once was." Sargent stated that the song "sounds nothing like the chrome-plated crunk&b nor the moonlit balladry that Ciara has staked her name on." Musically, the song is a dance-pop-R&B number which makes use of electro and funk music, as well as displaying disco and soul influences. The song has a minimalistic dance beat, with a "funky, retro 70s style R&B guitar" as the backdrop. Lauren Carter of the Boston Herald said that the song is influenced by Timberlake's disco-funk work on FutureSex/LoveSounds (2006), stating that "it sounds like a reworked version of his bass-heavy dance number "Sexy Ladies." Carter commented that Timberlake was "ushering Ciara away from her typically crunk-laced stylings in favor of JT’s electro-slide." Ann Powers of The Los Angeles Times said that the song was "Madonna-esque." Both Ciara and Timberlake provide verses, accompanied by vocal whims and falsetto.

== Critical reception ==
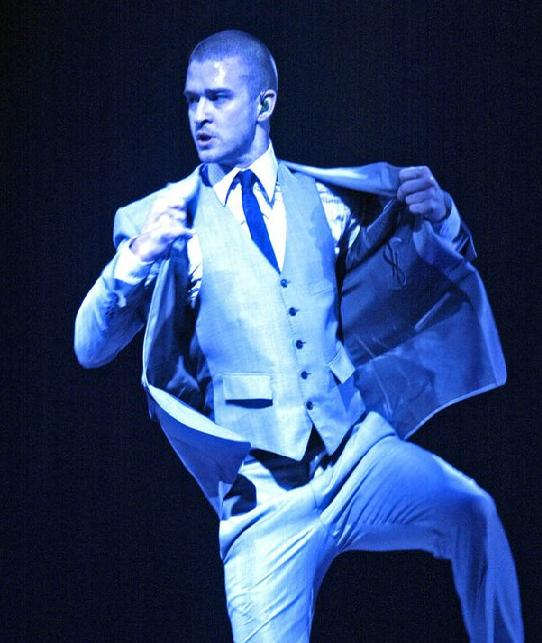
Critics were divided over the pairing of Ciara and Timberlake (pictured).

Dan Gennoe of Yahoo! Music said that with the track, Ciara "lucked into the sexiest thing to happen to pop since Timberlake's own FutureSex/LoveSounds," calling the song one of the "biggest anthems of the year." Gennoe went on to call the song the "highlight" and "saving grace" of Fantasy Ride. Nick Levine of Digital Spy said that "the track itself is nearly as sexy as the promo clip", commenting "Ciara purrs, and Timberlake, if you'll pardon the pun, more than rises to the occasion. All in all, 'Love Sex Magic' is pretty much spot on." Lauren Carter of the Boston Herald said "It’s not quite magic, but it grows on you." Jeremy Medina of Entertainment Weekly said, "Hooking up with Timberlake essentially guarantees a one-way ticket back to chart supremacy, so nice work there, Ciara." Medina went on to call the song an early candidate for "song of the summer."

Jon Caramanica from The New York Times welcomed the "female aggression" presented by Ciara on the track. Caramanica called it an unexpected twist, calling Ciara "still curiously anonymous". He noted that Timberlake, not a "vocal powerhouse" himself, out-sings Ciara on the track. Tom Breihan of Pitchfork Media said that the song was not bad and complimented the song's disco feel. He said that it gained Ciara a "radio foothold that had been hers to lose a couple of years ago", and commented that it seemed like "a bargain-basement Justin Timberlake track, the sort of thing he could've had lying around in a closet somewhere nearly three years after FutureSex/LoveSounds." Breihan pointed out that "Timberlake's nerdy swagger really highlights Ciara's total lack of presence." Jordan Sargent of PopMatters criticized the song for being generic, calling it "a formulaic FutureSex/LoveSounds disco retread", commenting "The song probably could’ve been given to any struggling female singer and become a hit, and the fact that Ciara had to use it as her parachute is as puzzling as it is unfortunate." Andy Kellman of AllMusic called the song a "hobbling flop" and said that it was "easily forgettable."

At the 52nd Grammy Awards, "Love Sex Magic" was nominated for the award for Best Pop Collaboration with Vocals. It lost to Jason Mraz and Colbie Caillat's "Lucky".

== Chart performance ==
Love Sex Magic debuted at number 86 on the US Billboard Hot 100 chart. In its second week, the single jumped to number 27 on the chart. In its third week, the song rose to number ten, becoming Ciara's fifth top ten single. It was her first top ten entry since "Get Up" in 2006. "Love Sex Magic" appeared on multiple Billboard component charts, reaching number fourteen on the Pop Songs chart, number eighteen on the Hot Dance Club Songs chart, and eighty-three on the Hot R&B/Hip-Hop Songs chart. The single was certified platinum by the Recording Industry Association of America (RIAA) for sales of a million digital copies in the United States.

Although the single did not rank among Ciara's most successful singles in the United States, it performed well overall in international markets. In Canada, the song debuted at number nine on the Canadian Hot 100, and would later peak at number six. In Australia, the song debuted at number six on the Australian ARIA Singles Chart, peaking at number five the next week. It spent fourteen weeks on the chart, and was eventually certified Platinum by the Australian Recording Industry Association (ARIA), for shipments totaling 70,000 copies. In New Zealand, the song debuted at number fourteen on the New Zealand Singles Chart. It remained stagnant the next week until it peaked at six on the chart the following week. Having spent thirteen weeks on the chart, the song was certified Gold by the Recording Industry Association of New Zealand (RIANZ), for shipments totaling 7,500 copies.

Across Europe, the single met a commercial success and charted in the top ten of seven charts, including France, in which it peaked at number 8, becoming Ciara's second top ten-hit in the country after "Takin' Back My Love" (2009) with Enrique Iglesias, which peaked at number 2 several months earlier. Also, the single peaked at number 4 in Ireland and Sweden, becoming her second top ten in the latter, number 7 in Germany and number 9 in Switzerland. It reached the top twenty of four others, including Austria, Belgium (both regions), Hungary and Denmark and top thirty in Finland. It was less successful in the Netherlands and Italy, where the song peaked at number 41 and 49, respectively. However, due to its numerous chartings in Europe, the song peaked at number six on the European Hot 100 chart. In the United Kingdom, "Love Sex Magic" debuted at number six on the UK Singles Chart, peaking at number five the following week. The song spent seventeen non-consecutive weeks on the chart, as well as topping the UK R&B Chart for two weeks. In the Republic of Ireland, the song peaked at number four on the Irish Singles Chart, climbing from number seven the previous week.

== Music video ==
=== Background ===
The Diane Martel-directed music video for "Love Sex Magic" premiered on March 22, 2009. In an interview with MTV News, Ciara said: "It's all about showing another side of me with this video. I'm basically giving you a show you'd see in Vegas—and it's my love, sex and magic show. He's the voyeur and I play with him a little bit. I got my inspiration from the Crazy Horse show and just from the shows [in Vegas], period. It's giving you the elements of love and sex and magic." In a later interview about the video, Ciara stated that she had to lick Timberlake's ear, and at one point, he was licking her neck and they were "freestyling." Martel wanted them to do something "edgy," so they found a "cool way to do it." Ciara noted the different pauses in cuts in between the tapings, commenting "so it's licking on the neck, again, then his biting on my neck, again. It was really funny." The singer would later elaborate on the Crazy Horse show reference in an interview with Blues & Soul, explaining that she had so much respect for the show that it became her reference. On working with Timberlake, she said, "Justin is one of the most easy-going, down-to-earth, hard-working and passionate artists you could ever work with. And, with both me and him, our goal was just to make the best video we could possibly make together, and to give the fans something a little fun and a little unexpected."

=== Synopsis ===
A scene from the video, in which Ciara portrays a tigress in a cage

The video opens with Ciara and Timberlake face to face, caressing seductively. The camera cuts to Ciara who appears almost impervious to gravity. Dressed in lingerie, she maneuvers around a horizontal dance pole; background dancers are veiled in vibrant color schemes and alternating strobe lights. The video then cuts to Ciara in a leotard, posing in abstract and flexible poses. Ciara is then seen dressed in a tiger-striped catsuit performing solo dance moves on a stage. Timberlake performs his verse seated onstage while Ciara performs intricate tricks, such as snaking under his legs. Then the two begin to lightly move to the track before Ciara forms her body as an armrest as he leans on her. Ciara and the dancers perform choreography and cabaret-style moves on the pole. The bridge of the song puts Timberlake on the ground and Ciara, standing over him, turns and performs her signature "Matrix" over him as he guides her body toward his with his right hand. The two perform and as Ciara gets up, Timberlake smacks her side as she pops to the beat. The video then cuts to a scene with Ciara in the catsuit portraying a tiger in a cage. In the final scene, Ciara and the dancers perform, dressed in 1970s-inspired tuxedos and colored afros. The video ends with clips of Ciara's multiple performance scenes from throughout the video.

=== Reception ===
Nick Levine of Digital Spy gave the video a positive review: "The video that accompanies this track is one of the year's best so far—and certainly the sexiest: Ciara licks Justin's ear, Justin reciprocates by slapping her bum, and, well, Ciara's flexibility would put many a poledancer to shame. Quite frankly, the whole thing could make a nun have impure thoughts." At the 2009 MTV Video Music Awards, the video was nominated for "Best Choreography;" it lost to Beyoncé's "Single Ladies (Put a Ring on It)." The video ranked at number thirty-nine on BET's Notarized: Top 100 Videos of 2009 countdown.

The music video on YouTube has received over 75 million views as of April 2024.

== Live performances ==
On May 9, 2009, Ciara performed the song on Saturday Night Live with Timberlake, that night's host and introduced by Timberlake's wife Jessica Biel. Accompanied by live instruments, Ciara performed choreography with backup dancers, while Timberlake played the keyboard. Timberlake and Ciara danced provocatively after he came from behind the keyboard to perform his verse. During the set, Ciara also performed "Never Ever." A writer for BET's Sound Off Blog said: "Aside from the fact that her grunts were live and her stage humps were unreal, Ciara’s set was pretty decent. Not that I expected any less from the A-Town princess, but that was a pretty tasty performance." The writer pointed out that Timberlake was not even noted on the set until he began his verse. In an interview with MTV News, Ciara went into detail about the setup of the performance, stating:

"I just kind of felt cool, 'cause Justin can play [piano] real well and he really gets into the music and it was, like, 'Hey, let's make you part of the band.' Having Justin in the background for the live performance was very different from the music video for the song, where we two dance quite provocatively with one another. [We wanted to] do something different and make it fun. It was awesome to see him pick up the keys."

On May 13, 2009, Ciara performed the song on The Ellen DeGeneres Show, accompanied by background dancers. Ciara and the dancers performed choreography similar to that of the video and wore the 1970s-inspired suits and afros. The same day, she performed the song with "Never Ever" on Jimmy Kimmel Live! Ciara performed the song at the 2009 MTV Video Music Awards Japan on May 30, 2009.

== Track listing and versions ==
- German Maxi CD
1. "Love Sex Magic" (Main Version) – 3:40
2. "Love Sex Magic" (Instrumental) – 3:40
3. "Love Sex Magic" (PokerFace Club Mix) – 4:19
4. "Love Sex Magic" (Jason Nevins Sex Club Radio Mix) – 3:28
5. "Love Sex Magic" (Video) – 3:40
- UK and European CD Single
1. "Love Sex Magic" (Main Version) – 3:40
2. "Go Girl" (featuring T-Pain) (Main Version) – 4:29

== Credits and personnel ==
- Ciara – vocals
- Justin Timberlake – vocals, producer, writer, instruments, music programming
- James Fauntleroy – producer, writer, music programming
- Rob Knox – producer, writer, instruments, music programming
- Mike Elizondo – producer, writer, instruments
- Spike Stent – audio mixing
- Henson Recording Studios in Los Angeles, CA - recording studio

== Charts ==
=== Weekly charts ===
Weekly chart performance for "Love Sex Magic"
Chart (2009)	Peak position
Australia (ARIA)	5
Austria (Ö3 Austria Top 40)	17
Belgium (Ultratop 50 Flanders)	19
Belgium (Ultratop 50 Wallonia)	17
Canada Hot 100 (Billboard)	6
Canada CHR/Top 40 (Billboard)	8
Canada Hot AC (Billboard)	13
CIS Airplay (TopHit)	43
Denmark (Tracklisten)	12
Europe (European Hot 100 Singles)	6
Finland (Suomen virallinen lista)	23
France (SNEP)	8
Germany (GfK)	7
Hungary (Rádiós Top 40)	11
Ireland (IRMA)	4
Italy (FIMI)	49
Japan (Japan Hot 100)	15
Mexico Ingles Airplay (Billboard)	3
Netherlands (Dutch Top 40)	26
Netherlands (Single Top 100)	41
New Zealand (Recorded Music NZ)	6
Scottish Singles Sales (Official Charts)	5
Sweden (Sverigetopplistan)	4
Switzerland (Schweizer Hitparade)	9
UK Singles (Official Charts)	5
UK Airplay (Music Week)	2
UK Hip Hop/R&B (Official Charts)	1
US Billboard Hot 100	10
US Dance Airplay (Billboard)	16
US Dance Club Songs (Billboard)	18
US Hot R&B/Hip-Hop Songs (Billboard)	83
US Pop Airplay (Billboard)	14
US Rhythmic Airplay (Billboard)	13

=== Monthly charts ===
Monthly chart performance for "Love Sex Magic"
Chart (2009)	Peak position
Brazil (Brasil Hot 100 Airplay)	39

=== Year-end charts ===
Year-end chart performance for "Love Sex Magic"
Chart (2009)	Position
Australia (ARIA)	46
Belgium (Ultratop 50 Flanders)	83
Brazil (Crowley)	44
Canada (Canadian Hot 100)	67
Europe (European Hot 100 Singles)	92
France (SNEP)	96
Hungary (Rádiós Top 40)	58
Japan Adult Contemporary (Billboard)	57
Sweden (Sverigetopplistan)	61
Switzerland (Schweizer Hitparade)	86
UK Singles (OCC)	53

== Certifications ==
Certifications and sales for "Love Sex Magic"
Region	Certification	Certified units/sales
Australia (ARIA)	Platinum	70,000^{^}
New Zealand (RMNZ)	Gold	7,500^{*}
United Kingdom (BPI)	Gold	400,000^{^}
United States (RIAA)	Platinum	1,000,000^{‡}
^{*} Sales figures based on certification alone.^{^} Shipments figures based on certification alone.^{‡} Sales+streaming figures based on certification alone.

== Radio and release history ==
Release dates and formats for "Love Sex Magic"
Region	Date	Format
United States	March 3, 2009	Mainstream and rhythmic airplay
United States	March 13, 2009	Digital download
United Kingdom	April 5, 2009	Digital download
Japan	April 8, 2009	Digital download
Germany	April 17, 2009	Digital download
Germany	May 1, 2009	CD single
Germany	May 1, 2009	Maxi single
