= Work (Ciara song) =

Single by Ciara featuring Missy Elliott

from the album Fantasy Ride
- B-side: "Fit of Love"
- Released: July 24, 2009
- Genre: Electropop; dance
- Length: 4:05
- Label: LaFace
- Songwriters: Ciara Harris; Nate Hills; Marcella Araica; Missy Elliott
- Producers: Danja; Marcella Araica

Ciara singles chronology
"Love Sex Magic" (2009)	"Work" (2009)	"Ride" (2010)

Missy Elliott singles chronology
"Let's Just Do It" (2009)	"Work" (2009)	"Fakin' It" (2009)

Music video
- "Work" on YouTube

"Work" is a song recorded by American recording artist Ciara for her third studio album Fantasy Ride (2009). It was released by LaFace Records on July 24, 2009, as the album's third and final single. Rapper Missy Elliott provides featured vocals on the song. Ciara and Elliott wrote it in collaboration with its producers Nate "Danja" Hills and Marcella Araica. "Work" is a fast-paced electropop and dance song with elements of bounce music and hip hop. Ciara described it as an energetic club track, and considered it initially as the lead single of Fantasy Ride.

"Work" received mixed opinions overall by critics, some of whom called it the album's strongest track and praised its hook, while others regarded the song as unoriginal and disappointing. The single peaked at number 52 on the UK Singles Chart and number 46 in Sweden. In Ireland, it reached number 31, the single's highest peak position on any chart. Melina Matsoukas directed the song's music video, in which Ciara performs with her dancers.

== Background ==
Ciara and Missy Elliott wrote "Work" in collaboration with its primary producer Nate "Danja" Hills and additional producer Marcella Araica. Araica recorded the track at Chalice Recording Studios in Los Angeles and Goldmind Studios in Virginia Beach. Jared Newcomb later assisted her for mixing, at Chalice Recording Studios. The song was announced in June 2008 and was revealed in October to be a duet with Elliott. "Work" was their third collaboration, following Ciara's "1, 2 Step" (2004) and Elliott's "Lose Control" (2005). Ciara told MTV News on the set for the music video of "Go Girl" that "Work" is "crazy and out of this world. The energy is to the 10th power again." Ciara elaborated on her collaboration with Elliott in an interview for Blogcritics:

When Missy and I do a record, the energy is on a whole other level. I can't explain exactly what it is. It's just the energy, I think. She knows how to really make a party a party. That's what I want – to make this record to be the ultimate party record. That's pretty much how that all came about. ... I guess each time we work together, we give 100% of our energy to each other. It's crazy. Sometimes you can't explain what the chemistry is. It's just how you feel.

Ciara originally planned to release Fantasy Ride in the form of three discs, each representing a particular sound. The third disc "Kingdom of Dance", which featured dance-oriented music, was set to include "Work". In an August 2008 interview for Billboard, Ciara regarded the song as energetic and great to listen to while exercising: "you're going to sweat up a storm in the club." "Work" and "High Price" were at one point in contention to serve as the album's lead single, but "Go Girl" was selected instead. "Work" was released worldwide on July 24, 2009, as the fifth and final single of Fantasy Ride. On August 21, 2009, B-side track "Fit of Love" appeared on the German CD single release of "Work". The single was digitally released in the United States on December 8, 2009.

== Composition ==
Ciara featuring Missy Elliott – "Work"
"Work" is an electropop and dance song with hip hop beats.

"Work" is an electropop and dance-pop song hinted with elements of bounce music in its production.

Characterized by its club appeal, the song exhibits its stimulating fashion with Ciara's club-natured lyrics that evoke the enticing allure of nightlife and cater to the classic ambiance of a nightclub setting, complemented by a spirited and fast-paced tempo infused with tinged elements of dance-pop and hip hop. Apart from Ciara's provocative allusions that sensually reflects her affinity towards the club scene in her lyricism, the song also incorporates crisp electronic dance claps, minimalistic dance snares, and intricately multilayered synth bleeps as fundamental elements within the backdrop of the song's rhythmic framework. Andrew Rennie of Canadian magazine Now described the instrumentation as "kick drum-heavy", and Joey Guerra of the Houston Chronicle called it a "frenetic club track". Sarah Rodman of The Boston Globe wrote that Ciara "nimbly navigates synth bleats and burps and a shake-and-shimmy beat". The song opens with lines by Elliott as she raps "When the song come on in the club, turn it up, turn it up, turn it up." Ciara then opens the first verse, singing "The dance train is coming back again. Extravaganza, you should run and tell a friend." The hook consists of the repeated remarks "Work! Work!" Digital Spy's David Balls regarded the line "You better shake that thang [sic] like a donkey!" as "thought-provoking".

== Critical reception ==
Sarah Rodman of The Boston Globe named "Work" the album's best track and praised Elliott's addition. Rodman wrote that Ciara "takes her own advice to 'put some snap into it'." About.com writer Bill Lamb named it one of the album's best, and wrote that it "lands somewhere between Ciara's contemporary classic '1, 2 Step' and Missy Elliott's own 'Lose Control'." Andrew Rennie of Now considered it the album's strongest track and noted Ciara and Elliott's "trademark chemistry". IGN's Finn White wrote that the song "will make all the bad girls sweat on the dance floor". In his review of Fantasy Ride, Marrio Tarradell of The Dallas Morning News wrote that "Love Sex Magic" is a "dance-floor corker", and noted that "Work" is "similarly club-ready", referring both songs to as "ultra-catchy". Regarding "Work", Tarradell wrote, "The rapid-fire 'work, work, work' refrain will bond to your head as if with Krazy Glue." Writing for Metro Weekly, Doug Rule called the song an "instant classic" and referred it to as a "sequel of sorts to Elliott's marvelous 2002 hit 'Work It'." A writer from Rap-Up named the song one of the album's top tracks.

David Balls of Digital Spy rated "Work" three stars out of five, writing that it "bears all the ingredients of a smash, but lacks the killer blow to leave you gasping for air." Balls also noted that Ciara tends to rely on guest artists to guarantee a hit. The Houston Chronicle critic Joey Guerra called the song a "blast of energy", but observed that it is "too reminiscent of past Ciara/Elliott hits". Guerra said that "A little variation would have made for a more dynamic tune." Andy Kellman of Allmusic was more critical and called the song an "over-stuffed dancefloor mess that does not benefit from Missy Elliott's hoarse hectorin". Jordan Sargent of PopMatters considered the song a letdown due to Ciara's "lifeless" vocal delivery. Dan Gennoe of Yahoo! UK & Ireland referred to the song as "an underwhelming twitch which Missy surely wouldn't have had anywhere near one of her own albums."

== Chart performance ==
On July 11, 2009, "Work" entered the UK Singles Chart at number 71 and rose to number 56 the following week. In its third week, it rose by four positions to reach number 52 and was present on the chart for seven weeks. "Work" reached number 31 on the Irish Singles Chart. On July 13, 2009, the song entered the Australian Singles Chart at number 98. After ascending for several weeks, it peaked at number 66 in its fifth week on the chart. In Sweden, "Work" debuted on the Sverigetopplistan chart at number 50 on July 17, 2009. The following week, the song ascended to its peak position at number 46.

== Music video ==
Ciara posing in a tire while sporting a turquoise dress in the music video for "Work"

The music video for "Work" was directed by Melina Matsoukas, who previously directed the clip for Ciara's single "Go Girl" (2008). A preview premiered in early June 2009 and promotional photos were later released. The full video premiered in the United Kingdom on June 23, 2009 at 7 pm on 4Music, and was later broadcast on Channel 4, at midnight. The following day, the video was added to Ciara's official profile on Bebo.

The video commences with shots of a construction site, where Ciara arrives in a large construction vehicle. Elliott raps her opening verse from the top of a pile of large tires while Ciara makes her debut in a gray jumpsuit with square aviator sunglasses. She soon appears in a slender black leotard and walks seductively along a construction walkway. Ciara and her dancers move to a dune in front of the site, where they perform a group choreography. The dancers wear white tops, torn blue jeans, construction belts and goggles. The second verse features an intense dance and switches halfway through to Ciara in a turquoise PVC dress and black strap stilettos, dancing in front of a pile of tires. She and her dancers return to the dune and dance to Elliott's words. The video ends in the sand dune as Ciara and her dancers slowly drop to the ground and then get back up.

== Formats and track listings ==
- CD single / digital download
1. "Work" – 4:05
2. "Fit of Love" – 3:18
- US digital download
1. "Work" – 4:05

== Credits and personnel ==
- Songwriting – Ciara Harris, Nate Hills, Marcella Araica, Missy Elliott
- Production – Danja
- Additional production – The Incredible Lago
- Vocal arrangement – Ciara
- Mixing – Marcella "Ms. Lago" Araica

Credits are adapted from the liner notes of Fantasy Ride.

== Charts ==
Chart (2009)	Peak position
Australia (ARIA)	66
Ireland (IRMA)	31
Sweden (Sverigetopplistan)	46
UK Singles (Official Charts)	52
UK Hip Hop/R&B (Official Charts)	18

== Release history ==
Country	Release date	Format(s)
Australia	July 23, 2009	Digital download
Sweden	July 27, 2009	Digital download
United Kingdom	July 27, 2009	CD single, digital download
Germany	August 21, 2009	CD single
United States	December 8, 2009	Digital download
