= Like a Surgeon (Ciara song) =

Song by Ciara

from the album Fantasy Ride
- Recorded: 2008
- Genre: R&B
- Length: 4:27
- Label: LaFace
- Songwriters: Christopher Stewart, Terius Nash
- Producers: Tricky Stewart, The-Dream

"Like a Surgeon" is a song recorded by American recording artist Ciara. Written by The-Dream and produced by Tricky Stewart, the song is included on her third studio album, Fantasy Ride. It was planned to be released as the third single from the album in North America, but its release was cancelled. It still manage to chart on the lower half of US R&B charts.

The song's promotion began on MTV. During a commercial for the album, Ciara sang part of the song in a cappella.

== Release and chart performance ==
It was first confirmed on Ciara's official Twitter page that she would be filming videos for two singles simultaneously although at that time it was not clear which singles would be released. Now it is confirmed that "Work" will be released to International markets while "Like a Surgeon" will receive the video and single treatment in North America. It was due to be released in June 2009, but its release was cancelled, due to the poor sales of Fantasy Ride in the US. The song debuted at 92 on the Billboard Hot R&B/Hip-Hop Songs chart in the June 13, 2009 issue of Billboard magazine.

== Critical reception ==
"Like a Surgeon" received generally mixed reviews. Slant Magazine said that "The only major disaster is "Like a Surgeon," which is filled with creepy, ill-conceived metaphors for sex". The New York Times said that "The welcome dash of female sexual aggression on "Like a Surgeon" is an unexpected twist". AllMusic opined: "On the hypnotically winding "Like a Surgeon", the-Dream provides some of his best, gimmicky, post-R. Kelly similes and metaphors, delivered by Ciara with all the necessary arrogance: "I appreciate your recovery time, but you need a physical one more time". The Boston Globe said that "The droning, hook-free "Like a Surgeon" [is] not an A-game effort for songwriting team Tricky and The-Dream". Pitchfork wrote that "The-Dream and Tricky Stewart tend to fill their tracks with empty spaces, and Ciara's voice needs hall-of-mirrors production to really register, so slight, minimal tracks like "Ciara to the Stage" and "Like a Surgeon" leave her sounding stranded". Dotmusic said: "'Like A Surgeon' and 'Pucker Up' make a lot of noise, piling on synths, stutters and bleeps, but are neither killer club tunes nor decent pop". BBC Music said that "Only Like A Surgeon with its somewhat bizarre sex/hospital metaphors may leave you at a loss for words".

Billboard gave the song a positive review, saying that it "finds the young siren operating under the guise of a sexual braggart on a song that sounds like it may have been modeled after the late Aaliyah's more ambitious album tracks. Tricky Stewart creates a tense production template for the singer to explore a darker, sexier side than listeners may be used to hearing from her. Plodding synth lines, an unusual bassline and a stop-and-go rhythm add up to one of Ciara's most interesting singles to date".

On November 21, 2017, Billboard magazine ranked "Like a Surgeon" at #98 on its list of the 100 Best Deep Cuts by 21st Century Pop Stars, writing "A planned-but-canceled single from Ciara's third LP, it's not hard to see why "Like a Surgeon" was ultimately deemed unfit for radio: The song's lurching beat, overstuffed chorus and "Weird Al"-reminiscent title all seemed a little off-kilter for late-'00s pop. That slight discomfort is what makes the song a fan favorite, though, an assured CiCi just a little more sinister than usual with the scalpel, but still making all the right cuts, proving herself the "true tactician" of the chorus."

== Charts ==
| Chart (2009) | Peak position |
|---|---|
| US Hot R&B/Hip-Hop Songs (Billboard) | 59 |
