= Go Girl (Ciara song) =

Single by Ciara featuring T-Pain

from the album Fantasy Ride
- A-side: "Love Sex Magic"
- Released: September 26, 2008
- Recorded: 2008
- Length: 4:29
- Label: LaFace, Zomba
- Songwriters: Ciara Harris; Faheem "T-Pain" Najm; David Balfour; Jasper Cameron
- Producers: T-Pain; Jasper Cameron

Ciara singles chronology
"Stepped on My J'z" (2008)	"Go Girl" (2008)	"Takin' Back My Love" (2009)

T-Pain singles chronology
"Can't Believe It" (2008)	"Go Girl" (2008)	"Go Hard" (2008)

Music video
- "Go Girl" on YouTube

"Go Girl" is a song co-written and performed by American R&B singer Ciara. The song was released as the lead single, for her third studio album Fantasy Ride, however it was only included on the Japan version of the album. The track is a female empowerment anthem that preaches control, featuring semi-auto-tune vocals and a mid-tempo beat.

"Go Girl" was released worldwide to digital outlets on September 26, 2008 and sent to radio stations on September 30, 2008. The song garnered mixed reviews from music critics. The single made Vibe's 80 Best Songs of 08' list, at the number 69. The Official Remix of the song features American rapper, Gorilla Zoe.

The single was also used as the intro for Ciara's supporting act set, for Britney Spears world tour The Circus Starring Britney Spears.

== Production ==
"Go Girl" was originally written by T-Pain and rewritten with Ciara. Also, it features T-Pain. According to BET's Access Granted, LaFace A&R executive Mark Pitts asked T-Pain to write and produce tracks for Ciara's third album Fantasy Ride. T-Pain had several top ten hits and collaborated with Chris Brown on his U.S. number one single, "Kiss Kiss". "I enjoyed the whole process" said Ciara, while on the "Go Girl" music video set. T-Pain said on the video set, "The record came together basically with me and Ciara working for days in the studio, and we got pressured to ... make a song." It is the only song they finished recording.

The demo recording of "Go Girl" titled, "Hood Girl" leaked on the internet in mid-August 2008. It contains alternate lyrics and limits T-Pain's vocals.

In April 2009, when the track listing for Fantasy Ride was released through online retailers, it revealed that the track will not be featured on the Standard version of the album, but the music video will be featured on limited edition of the Fantasy Ride. It was, however, featured on the B-side to the physical release of the Love Sex Magic single and on the Japanese editions of Fantasy Ride as a bonus track.

== Release ==
In the United States, "Go Girl" was solicited to New York radio station Hot 97 on September 2, 2008. Two days later, the song was posted on Ciara's official MySpace page. Despite not being officially released, the song began to garner radio airplay. On September 30, 2008, "Go Girl" was released worldwide as a digital download.

Go Girl peaked at number 26 on the Billboard Hot R&B/Hip-Hop Songs chart, number 88 on the Pop 100, and spent one week on the Hot 100, at number 78.

== Music video ==
Directed by Melina Matsoukas, the music video was shot on September 19 and September 20, 2008. The video begins with Ciara sitting in a chair at a desk with a typewriter with four female dancers behind her in chairs. She is dressed in a dominatrix catsuit and thigh-high black stiletto boots. Then, Ciara jumps off the desk and does an immediate split, She and her dancers perform erotic choreography on the chairs. Second, Ciara walks into an elevator. She gets in and performs erratic choreography and shows her transforming. Then, she exits the elevator. She and her dancers make robotic movements and dance routines. Shortly after, T-Pain performs his verse and dances. Ciara in a different sexy robotic costume is sitting on a motorcycle with sparks shooting from the back. Next, the music video goes to a dance break, calling all the "Go Girls" to the dance floor. Ciara slides down a pole and starts performing intense choreography with several dancers. The video concludes with Ciara typing "Go Girl" on the typewriter.

The music video for "Go Girl" premiered on BET's "Access Granted" and Yahoo! Music on October 7, 2008.

== Versions and formats ==
Digital download

1. "Go Girl" – 3:55

Note

"Go Girl" appears as the b-side to "Love Sex Magic" on the European and UK physical releases.

== Charts ==
Chart (2008)	Peak position
US Billboard Hot 100	78
US Hot R&B/Hip-Hop Songs (Billboard)	26
US Pop 100 (Billboard)	88
US Rhythmic Airplay (Billboard)	26

== Release history ==
Country	Date	Format	Label
Australia	September 26, 2008	Digital download	Zomba
Canada	September 26, 2008	Digital download	Zomba
Finland	September 26, 2008	Digital download	Zomba
France	September 26, 2008	Digital download	Zomba
Italy	September 26, 2008	Digital download	Zomba
Mexico	September 26, 2008	Digital download	Zomba
Spain	September 26, 2008	Digital download	Zomba
United States	September 26, 2008	Digital download	LaFace Records
United States	September 30, 2008	Rhythmic radio	LaFace Records
