= Never Ever (Ciara song) =

Single by Ciara featuring Young Jeezy

from the album Fantasy Ride
- Released: January 19, 2009
- Recorded: 2008
- Genre: R&B; hip hop
- Length: 4:33
- Label: LaFace Records; RCA
- Songwriters: Elvis Williams; Ciara Harris; Esther Dean; Jay Jenkins; Kenneth Gamble; Leon Huff
- Producers: Ester Dean; Polow da Don; BlacElvis

Ciara singles chronology
"Takin' Back My Love" (2009)	"Never Ever" (2009)	"Love Sex Magic" (2009)

Young Jeezy singles chronology
"Who Dat" (2008)	"Never Ever" (2009)	"Amazing" (2009)

Audio sample
- "Never Ever": file; help

Music video
- "Never Ever" on YouTube

"Never Ever" is a song performed by American R&B singer Ciara. It is the first single released from her third studio album, Fantasy Ride. The song features American rapper Young Jeezy, was produced by Polow da Don, and was co-written by Ciara and Elvis "BlacElvis" Williams, who both produced and co-wrote Ciara's single, "Promise", from her second album, Ciara: The Evolution.

== Background ==
I make her sound like a vocalist versus the other stuff she may do that's more performance, where she can get on the dance floor. It's kind of the same thing with Aaliyah. She may not have been the best singer, but her voice was so unique and her sound — she had her own lane, and I think Ciara is like that same thing..

— Producer Ester Dean. Polow da Don, comparing he and Ciara to Aaliyah and Timbaland.

For "Never Ever", Ciara collaborated with previous collaborator and associate Polow da Don, as well as Blac Elvis. Ciara previously worked with the two on a previous single, "Promise" (2006). Polow da Don told MTV News, "We both came up and were raised in the same camp. We've known each other for a long time." When talking about the working relationship between him and Ciara, he replied, "We actually just have this natural chemistry that I don't even have with some of my own artists. I understand her and I understand what she should be doing. I look at it like this: When I work with her, I'm a fan, and this is what I want her to be doing." Polow da Don went on to compare he and Ciara as having the formula to becoming the new Aaliyah and Timbaland, a famed singer-producer combination in the late 1990s.

Polow da Don also called the song a "hard midtempo", calling it an R&B version of a hard rap track, commenting, "where dudes can ride around in their cars and listen to R&B and not feel like a girl." Polow went on to call it "hard like a rap record", and said that was the reason why Young Jeezy didn't have a problem adding his contributions to it. Ciara went on to characterize the song as "one of those real records." She elaborated on that in particular on the set of the video shoot for the song, explaining:

"I can relate to it myself. I've been in a relationship before where I've given 100 percent, and I feel like I was given 80 percent. I fought so long to try and keep it up — keep it afloat and to keep it together, and you got to realize that if somebody's not going to want to — and the key word is 'want to' — love you the same way you love them, then it shouldn't be. It's a real situation, and it seems to be very common nowadays in conversations about love and relationships. I definitely know should be talked about, and I've experienced it before."

The song's chorus samples the 1972 worldwide hit, "If You Don't Know Me by Now", by popular Philadelphia soul musical group, Harold Melvin & the Blue Notes. Because of that, the song's writers and producers Kenneth Gamble and Leon Huff, known as the songwriting and production duo Gamble and Huff received songwriting credits

== Critical reception ==
Idio Magazine gave the song a positive review, stating that "The best artists are skilled at switching between a variety of musical styles and lyrical themes. In Ciara's case, complementing her club bangers (Goodies, 1,2 Step, Get Up, Go Girl) are slower, more laid-back jams (And I, Promise, Can’t Leave 'Em Alone). Staying true to that gameplan, she has re-enlisted 'Promise' producer Polow da Don for the latest single from her long-awaited junior album, Fantasy Ride." The magazine goes on to say that the single is "a smooth track encouraging females not to let their unrequited love for any man ruin their lives, but CiCi doesn’t neglect to provide a male perspective: enter Young Jeezy, who delivers a guest verse reminiscent of his contribution on Usher's "Love in This Club". In a nutshell, Never Ever has something for everyone."

Andy Kellman of Allmusic noted the song as one of the standout tracks on Fantasy Ride.

== Release ==
The single was sent to impact urban and mainstream/pop radio on January 19, 2009. Since its release at radio, the single has quickly garnered airplay success, even though major promotion hasn't begun yet, and despite a music video not previously being released. Starting on January 24, the song was promoted as the featured single on Myspace.

As of January 21, the song has garnered enough airplay that it debuted on the Bubbling Under R&B/Hip-Hop Singles at number 5. This single debuted on the US Billboard Hot R&B/Hip-Hop Singles at number 70, becoming the highest debut of the week for January 29, 2009. The following week, the single made a jump from number 70 to number 58 on the same chart. The same week, the single debuted on the Mainstream R&B/Hip-Hop Singles chart at number 38, also becoming the highest debut of the week for this chart. As of February 12, 2009, the single has peaked at number 54 on the Hot R&B/Hip-Hop Songs chart.

== Chart performance ==
In the single's first week of release, the song has sold 15,000 downloads, according to Nielsen SoundScan. On the issue date March 7, 2009, the single debuted at number 96 on the US Billboard Hot 100 chart. In its second week, the single climbed to number 79 on the chart. On the issue date May 16, 2009, the single reached its peak at number 66 on the chart. The song stayed on the chart for a total of 25 weeks. The single also peaked at number nine on the US Hot R&B/Hip-Hop Songs chart, becoming Ciara's eleventh top-ten single on that chart. The single was certified gold by the Recording Industry Association of America (RIAA) for sales of over 500,000 digital copies in the United States.

The song was also set to serve as the first single from "Fantasy Ride" in the United Kingdom and Ireland but was scrapped due to "Never Ever" performing poorly in the United States and because "Love Sex Magic" was already receiving attention. The song reached number one on the Sweden download charts on iTunes.

The song was due to be released as the third single in the United Kingdom, and the music video began circulating music channels, and local urban music stations (such as Kiss 100, and Choice FM) began rotating the song, however the original album version was not used, the Mike D Radio Mix version took its place, however when news was announced that Ciara was recording her fourth studio album, plans for the single were scrapped and the music video and single have been taken off stations playlists. Due to minor promotion, the single did not chart.

== Music video ==
Ciara shot the music video for the single in Atlanta in January 2009. Young Jeezy, the song's featured act, made an appearance in the video. A few pictures of the video shoot was released on the web on the following Monday. R&B singer Ruben Studdard, late rapper Dolla (who would be gunned down four months later on May 18, 2009), production team Jasper Cameron and Big Reese, who are also longtime friends of Ciara's, choreographer Jamaica Craft, and R&B singer Monica are cameos in the music video. The project, which was directed by Chris Robinson, had its release date set for January 31, as confirmed by Yahoo! Music. The video was released on January 30, 2009 BET's Access Granted.

The video begins with Ciara and a group of her friends discussing the characteristics of unrequited love with the Ciara song Promise playing in the background, which leads to a scene with Ciara dancing in her penthouse apartment. This scene is mixed with footage of a montage of close-ups with Ciara reciting the song (these clips are shown throughout the whole video). We are then introduced to a party scene, where Ciara and her boyfriend, portrayed by actor Kevin Phillips, are seen dancing with each other. While dancing, her boyfriend glances at another girl in the party - Ciara catches this and walks off, where her boyfriend then catches her and grabs her arm. The video then cuts to a dance sequence, with Ciara and her back-up dancers, in the middle of the crowd in the party. All the while, Ciara and her boyfriend are still arguing. Young Jeezy's scene in front of a golden backdrop is then shown, with Ciara standing beside him. Meanwhile, Al Horford comes up to Ciara, introduces himself, and asks her to dance. Realizing that she needs to let go of this frustrating relationship with her boyfriend and move on, she accepts. The video closes out with Ciara reciting the last line of the song, "If that boy don't love you by now..."

== Live performances ==
Ciara performed the song on May 12, 2009 on The Tonight Show with Jay Leno. She also performed the song on Good Morning America and Live with Regis and Kelly. She also performed the song at London's G-A-Y nightclub.

== Formats and track listings ==
These are the formats and track listings of major single releases of "Never Ever".

US CD Single

1. "Never Ever" (Main) – 4:29
2. "Never Ever" (Instrumental) – 4:29

Digital download

(Released: February 3, 2009)

1. "Never Ever" – 4:33

== Credits ==
- Written by Elvis Williams, Ciara Harris, Ester Dean, Jay Jenkins, Kenneth Gamble, Leon Huff
- Produced by Polow da Don & Ester Dean
- Mixed by: Marcella "Ms. Lago" Araica
- Lead & Background Vocals by Ciara
- Additional Background Vocals by Jamal Jones, Jay Jenkins
- All Programming by Jamal Jones
- Recorded by: Carlton "C Boog" Lynn
- Additional Recording at: Chalice Studios, Los Angeles, CA

== Charts ==
=== Weekly charts ===
Chart (2009)	Peak position
Brasil Hot 100 Airplay (Billboard)	17
Japan (Japan Hot 100)	53
Sweden (Sverigetopplistan)	25
US Billboard Hot 100	66
US Hot R&B/Hip-Hop Songs (Billboard)	9
US Rhythmic Airplay (Billboard)	33

=== Year-end charts ===
Chart (2009)	Position
US Hot R&B/Hip-Hop Songs (Billboard)	67

== Certifications ==
Region	Certification	Certified units/sales
United States (RIAA)	Gold	500,000^{‡}
^{‡} Sales+streaming figures based on certification alone.

== Release history ==
Region	Date	Format	Label
United States	January 20, 2009	Rhythmic contemporary	LaFace Records; RCA
United States	March 2, 2009	Contemporary hit radio	LaFace Records; RCA
United States	February 3, 2009	Digital download	LaFace Records; RCA
