= Fantasy Ride =

2009 Ciara album

Studio album by Ciara
- Released: May 3, 2009
- Recorded: 2007–2009
- Genres: Pop soul; dance; R&B
- Length: 50:46
- Labels: Jive; LaFace; Sony Music
- Producers: Blac Elvis; Benny Blanco; Blade; The Clutch; Rodney "Darkchild" Jerkins; Danja; Dr. Luke; Jason Nevins; Jim Beanz; Los Da Mystro; Ne-Yo; Syience; Osinachi Nwaneri; Polow da Don; Terius "The-Dream" Nash; C. "Tricky" Stewart; Chris N Teeb; Justin Timberlake; Rob Knox; T-Pain

Ciara chronology
Ciara: The Evolution (2006)	Fantasy Ride (2009)	Basic Instinct (2010)

International cover

Singles from Fantasy Ride
- 1. "Never Ever" Released: January 19, 2009; 2. "Love Sex Magic" Released: March 3, 2009; 3. "Work" Released: July 24, 2009

Fantasy Ride is the third studio album by American singer Ciara, first released on May 3, 2009, by Jive Records, LaFace Records and Sony Music Entertainment. The album was recorded between 2007 and 2009. Ciara was executive producer on the album along with co-executive Mark Pitts and, Ciara worked with several record producers, including Blac Elvis, Benny Blanco, Blade, Jasper Cameron, The Clutch, Darkchild, Danja, Dr. Luke, Jason Nevins, Jim Beanz, Los da Maestro, Ne-Yo, Osinachi Nwaneri, Polow da Don, The-Dream, Tricky Stewart, Justin Timberlake, T-Pain. The album featured several guest vocalists, including Justin Timberlake, Ludacris, Chris Brown, Young Jeezy, The-Dream, Missy Elliott.

The album combines R&B and hip hop sounds from her previous albums along with a new pop and dance direction. Fantasy Ride received generally mixed reviews from music critics, who complimented its slow jams and the club tracks, and Ciara's vocal performances, with some critics calling it "a consistently sexy listen" with other critics calling it "Ciara's smoothest ride ever". However, some critics found the album to be a "dud" and others saying "Ciara seems to go almost unnoticed". The album debuted at number three on US Billboard 200. Fantasy Ride became Ciara's third consecutive album to debut within the top three on that chart, making her only the fourth female artist to do so during that decade.

The album was supported by three singles: the US R&B top ten "Never Ever" with Young Jeezy, worldwide hit "Love Sex Magic" with Justin Timberlake, and "Work" with Missy Elliott, which reached the top 60 on international charts. A compilation EP titled Fantasy Ride: The Mini Collection was also released internationally in late July, the album also garnered numerous accolades including one nomination at the 2009 MTV Video Music Awards, and one nomination at the 52nd Grammy Awards.

== Production ==
At the start of 2008, Ciara began working on her third album. She became executive producer of the album, with LaFace Records A&R coordinator Mark Pitts. The first recording sessions saw her working with producers Tricky Stewart, Danja, Jasper Cameron, and The-Dream. In an interview from a concert, Ciara stated that she worked on two tracks with Justin Timberlake and his production team The Y's which will appear on the album. Spike Stent was involved in mixing tracks for the album which Ciara recorded at Chalice Studios.

Ciara stated in 2008 that she wanted her third album "to take fans on a musical journey". Billboard magazine initially reported that the album would be released across three discs, each representing a different theme and featuring stylistically similar songs. Danja consecutively produced the Crunktown and Kingdom of Dance cuts while the Groove City offerings were overseen by Tricky Stewart and Jasper Cameron. The Groove City recordings were intended to remind fans of the Evolution era. The first single "Never Ever" (featuring Young Jeezy) falls under this theme and is similar to previous single "Promise". Crunktown tracks are reminiscent of single "Goodies" and the trademark genre that Ciara is associated with. "High Price" (featuring Ludacris) was the original lead single and an example of what Ciara had created under the crunk theme. The final recordings where up-tempo pop-tinged, house, and freestyle cuts under the theme Kingdom of Dance which can be heard on the album's second single "Love Sex Magic" (featuring Justin Timberlake). However, during an interview the editor of Vibe in April, magazine Ciara confirmed that along with changing management she had dropped the three disc idea. The editor previewed six of the songs recorded for the album.

== Concept ==
"Super C is a character that people will learn more about on this record. That is my alter ego. Super C doesn't hold back. She is definitely aggressive. She goes hard. Super C can do some magical and funky things. She works hard. She dances to the 10th power. She does everything to the 10th power."

— Ciara, speaking on her alter ego Super C.

Fantasy Ride also introduces Ciara's comic book character, "Super C". Ciara said that Super C is her "inner strength and aggressive persona". She is a futuristic, superhero-esque Ciara, loosely based on the robotic character Ciara portrayed in the "Go Girl" music video.

DC Comics artist Bernard Chang helped Ciara create the character for the album artwork. Ciara said she worked on the artwork about nine months to a year. On April 5, her official website posted the new album covers (purple Super C for the standard edition, red Super C for the deluxe edition). Speaking on the images, Ciara stated, "Super C is my super hero name. It's who I am. It's the inner strength and drive that enables me to overcome any obstacles and who I have to be in order to accomplish my dreams and survive in this tough world." Her official website confirmed that in North America the album will feature the super hero covers whereas international markets will receive the human cover featuring Ciara on a faded white background.

== Promotion ==
In September 2008, Ciara promoted the forthcoming release of the album at Austell's Six Flags Over Georgia amusement park, with her parents and fans in attendance. For the day, the roller coaster Goliath was renamed Fantasy Ride. Ciara also met fans and signed autographs. She also released a promo single for the album, titled "Go Girl", which featured T-Pain on September 30, 2008. Ciara made her first stage appearance performing at Media WildJam '08, where she previewed a few unreleased tracks from the upcoming album, as well as performed past hits. Performances included new songs "I'm On", "Go Girl", "Ciara to The Stage", and "High Price". For a limited period of time UK and European customers at Foot Locker were given the chance to download an exclusive remix of "Go Girl" and had the opportunity to win a meeting with Ciara in person. Ciara announced that she would release a Fantasy Ride mixtape in anticipation for the album. However, only two tracks were made available, "Slow Down", featuring rapper 50 Cent and a cover of "Diva" by Beyoncé.

On Monday, February 23, 2009, Ciara made an appearance on BET's 106 & Park. There, she promoted the album, the new singles, and answered selected online fan questions. Ciara spoke about the controversy surrounding the track "Turntables" featuring Chris Brown, saying that it will be on the album, but that it might sound different in a good way. On Tuesday, February 24, 2009, Ciara was a special guest on Snoop Dogg's MTV show, "Dogg After Dark" although she did not formally promote the album. Ciara confirmed on April 2, 2009, that she has many promotions coming up for the album including performances live in the UK and US including appearing on Good Morning America and Jimmy Kimmel Live!. On April 25, 2009, during the UK promotions, Ciara performed "Love Sex Magic", "Never Ever", "Goodies" and "1 2 Step" at London's G-A-Y nightclub.

Ciara appeared on BET's 106 & Park on May 6, 2009, where she formally promoted her album, displayed some of her album artwork and co-hosted. On May 9, 2009, during an edition of Saturday Night Live hosted by Justin Timberlake and Jessica Biel, Ciara performed a special rendition of "Love Sex Magic" (featuring a James Brown interlude) with Timberlake and later appeared solo to perform "Never Ever". During the week of the album's release, Ciara promoted the album on numerous shows, including Good Morning America and The Ellen DeGeneres Show.

=== Singles ===
"Love Sex Magic"
A sample of "Love Sex Magic" featuring vocals from Ciara and Justin Timberlake. A "funky, 70s" guitar is present, giving the song a retro sound. Vocal moans from Timberlake are also heard.

"Go Girl", which features T-Pain, was originally released as the album's lead single. However, it was only included on the album version in Japan. The single reached number seventy-eight in the United States, and charted on the US R&B chart at number twenty-six and on the US Pop chart at number eighty-eight. A music video was made for this song and released in October 2008.

"Never Ever", which features Young Jeezy, was released as the first single in the United States on January 19, 2009, and reached number sixty-six on the Hot 100, but had more success on the R&B chart, where it reached number nine, becoming Ciara's eleventh top ten hit on that chart. Despite, not officially being released internationally, due to strong digital sales, it was able to chart in some countries, including Sweden and Russia, where it reached the top forty and top fifty, respectively.

"Love Sex Magic", which features Justin Timberlake, was released as the second US and first international single on March 3, 2009, and reached number ten in the United States, becoming Ciara's eight top ten single there. It became her biggest international hit to date reaching the top ten in over twenty countries, including India, Turkey, and Taiwan, where it reached number one. The song was nominated at the 52nd Grammy Awards for "Best Pop Collaboration with Vocals".

"Work", which features Missy Elliott, was released as the second international single on July 24, 2009, and reached the top forty in Ireland and top fifty in Sweden.

==== Other charted songs ====
"Ciara to the Stage" charted on the US Bubbling Under Hot 100 at number four the week following the album's release. "Turntables", which features Chris Brown, charted at number eighty in the United Kingdom, due to strong digital sales. The song uses a sample from the Hindi song "Kehna Hi Kya", from A. R. Rahman's soundtrack to the 1995 film Bombay. "I'm On", a deluxe edition bonus track, charted in Canada at number seventy-nine, due to strong digital sales. "Like a Surgeon" was planned to be as a single in North America, but its release was cancelled. Despite this, it peaked at number fifty-nine on the US R&B chart.

=== Touring ===
Ciara was the support act for Britney Spears for the eight London concerts of The Circus Starring Britney Spears tour in support of Fantasy Ride. The shows took place in June 2009 at the city's prestigious The O_{2} (London). On August 14, 2009 Jive Records released a press release about the then upcoming second-leg of the Circus Tour which revealed that fellow label mate Jordin Sparks was replacing Ciara as the opening act along with newcomer Kristinia DeBarge. In September 2009, it was revealed that Ciara had been in the studio recording her next album with Tricky Stewart and The-Dream during time which she would have been on tour. Ciara went on a 6-date tour in support of Fantasy Ride, titled Jay-Z & Ciara Live with Jay-Z during the summer. The dates were announced on Ciara's official website. She would later go to announce plans for her own world tour at towards the middle or end of 2009 in support of the album. However, with the production of the fourth album underway from Summer 2009, rumors were put to rest.

== Critical reception ==
Professional ratings
Review scores
Source	Rating
AllMusic	3/5 stars
Entertainment Weekly	B
The Guardian	4/5 stars
Los Angeles Times	2.5/4 stars
Newsday	B
Pitchfork	4.4/10
PopMatters	6/10 stars
Rolling Stone	2.5/5 stars
Slant Magazine	3/5 stars
Yahoo! Music UK	5/10 stars

On Metacritic, Fantasy Ride received a score of 60 out of 100, indicating "mixed or average reviews". BBC Music states: "When listing great pop stars of the 2000s, it's more than likely that Ciara will be unfairly forgotten. It's just as exciting to hear the slow jams as the club tracks, thanks to the detailed and often strange sounding backing tracks. She uses her silky vocals on softer tracks such as the Ne-Yo produced "I Don't Remember" or the delicate "Never Ever" to great effect. Only "Like a Surgeon" with its somewhat bizarre sex/hospital metaphors may leave you at a loss for words. Overall it is a record that manages to make you dance as much as retreat to the bedroom, Fantasy Ride is an album which could take Ciara to the much deserved next level. Slant Magazine also gave the album a positive review ending the review by calling the album "Ciara's smoothest ride ever".

The Guardian said "despite the usual collaborators, it is Ciara's presence that is stamped firmly on the album. Evidence that she is an under-rated balladeer comes in the form of "Keep Dancin' on Me", a shimmering slow jam, and the morning-after existential haze of "I Don't Remember", but a terpsichorean swagger remains at the heart of Ciara's world. Few artists go as hard as she does on her club jams, whether inviting the world to 'kiss my swag' over kinetic freestyle beats on "Pucker Up", combining outraged soprano braggadocio with thunderous crunk baselines on the broiling "High Price" or gliding smoothly through the delectable, sun-kissed "Echo". At her best, her pace is furious, and keeping up is exhilarating." Digital Spy gave it three out of five stars and commented that "Fantasy Ride features much the same cast of producers as countless other R&B albums from the last couple of years, but these A-list knob-twiddlers rarely try anything risky or inventive here. However, this isn't to say that Fantasy Ride is a bad album. It actually offers a consistently sexy listen with enough minor triumphs – "Love Sex Magic", "Turntables" and the electro-scuzzy "Pucker Up" – to hold your attention. Ciara, meanwhile, is on a seductive form throughout. Ciara's Fantasy Ride deserves the benefit of the doubt." However, Billboard gave it an average review, stating, "On 'High Price,' where she takes her vocals to an opera-like pitch, and her collaboration with the-Dream, 'Lover's Things,' whose faint tenor would seem like an ideal match, Ciara seems to go almost unnoticed. Thankfully, 'Work,' featuring Missy Elliott, has Ciara showing fly-girl antics over a house-like, clap-laden production, and the breakup song 'Never Ever,' featuring Young Jeezy, which samples 'If You Don't Know Me by Now,' pick up the slack." In his Consumer Guide, however, Robert Christgau gave the album a "dud" score.

== Commercial performance ==
On May 10, 2009, the album made its first appearance at number nine on the UK Albums Chart, becoming Ciara's first top ten album there. The album also made it to number two on the UK R&B Albums Chart. "Turntables" (featuring Chris Brown) charted in the UK at number 80 on the UK singles chart for just one week, it then dropped out. The song has received much airplay on UK radio station BBC Radio 1Xtra.

On the issue dated May 23, 2009, Fantasy Ride debuted at number three on the US Billboard 200 chart. This made it Ciara's third consecutive album to debut within the top three on that chart, making her only the fourth female artist to do so during this decade. Although the song "Go Girl" was initially planned to be released as the first worldwide single, after a disappointing chart performance, it eventually received just a promotional release. The song charted in the US at number 78 on the US Billboard Hot 100, 26 on the Hot R&B/Hip-Hop Songs chart and 88 on the Billboard Pop 100. "Ciara to the Stage" charted at number four on the US Bubbling Under Hot 100 during the week the album was released. As of June 2013, the album has sold 206,000 copies in the US, failing to match the success of previous albums Goodies (2.7 million copies) and Ciara: The Evolution (1.3 million copies).

In Canada, the album debuted at number twenty-two on the Canadian Albums Chart. This happened due to the song "I'm On", a deluxe edition track, to chart on the Canadian Hot 100 at number 79.

Additionally, the album reached top 10 in Argentina, and Ireland, where it debuted at number 9 and 10 respectively. Ciara also obtained her highest peak in Belgium, France, and Switzerland. As a whole the album peaked at number 20 in Europe. It debuted at number 69 in Italy.

== Track listing ==
Fantasy Ride track listing
No.	Title	Writer(s)	Producer(s)	Length
1.	"Ciara to the Stage"	Ciara Harris; Christopher Stewart; Rodney Richard; Brandon Bowles; Jasper Cameron	Don Vito; Tricky Stewart; Blade^{[a]}	3:46
2.	"Love Sex Magic" (featuring Justin Timberlake)	Justin Timberlake; Mike Elizondo; Rob Knox; James Fauntleroy II	The Y's	3:40
3.	"High Price" (featuring Ludacris)	Stewart; Terius Nash; Chris Bridges	Tricky Stewart; The-Dream	4:03
4.	"Turntables" (featuring Chris Brown)	Harris; Nathaniel Hills; Marcella Araica; Chris Brown; Candice Nelson; James Washington	Danja	4:32
5.	"Like a Surgeon"	Stewart; Nash	Tricky Stewart; The-Dream	4:27
6.	"Never Ever" (featuring Young Jeezy)	Harris; Jamal Jones; Elvis Williams; Ester Dean; Jay Jenkins; Kenneth Gamble; Leon Huff	Ester Dean; Polow da Don; Elvis Williams	4:33
7.	"Lover's Thing" (featuring The-Dream)	Nash; Carlos McKinney	Los da Mystro	3:28
8.	"Work" (featuring Missy Elliott)	Harris; Hills; Araica; Melissa Elliott	Danja; The Incredible Lago^{[b]}	4:06
9.	"Pucker Up"	Rodney Jerkins; Osinachi Nwaneri; Kalenna Harper	Rodney "Darkchild" Jerkins; Osinachi Nwaneri	3:52
10.	"G Is for Girl (A–Z)"	Harris; Timberlake; Rob Knox; Elizondo; Fauntleroy II	The Y's	3:37
11.	"Keep Dancin' on Me"	Stewart; Nash	Tricky Stewart; The-Dream	3:33
12.	"Tell Me What Your Name Is"	Lukasz Gottwald; Benjamin Levin; Ronnie Jackson	Dr. Luke; Benny Blanco	3:38
13.	"I Don't Remember"	Harris; Jones; Shaffer Smith; Lamar Taylor; Darnell Dalton	Polow da Don	3:48
Total length:				50:46

US iTunes Store pre-order bonus track
No.	Title	Writer(s)	Producer(s)	Length
14.	"When I"	Stacy Barthe; Corey Gibson	Dreshan "Champ Champ" Smith	4:03
Total length:				54:49

International bonus track
No.	Title	Writer(s)	Producer(s)	Length
14.	"Echo"	Harris; Aracia; Hills; Patrick Smith	Danja	3:38
Total length:				54:24

International iTunes Store bonus track
No.	Title	Writer(s)	Producer(s)	Length
15.	"Never Ever" (Mike D Radio Remix)	Harris; Jones; Williams; Dean; Jenkins; Gamble; Huff	Dean; Polow da Don; Williams; Mike D^{[c]}	4:03
Total length:				58:27

International Amazon MP3 bonus track
No.	Title	Writer(s)	Producer(s)	Length
16.	"When I"	Stacy Barthe; Corey Gibson	Dreshan "Champ Champ" Smith	4:03
Total length:				62:30

Japanese bonus tracks
No.	Title	Writer(s)	Producer(s)	Length
15.	"Go Girl" (featuring T-Pain)	Faheem Najm; David Balfour; Cameron; Harris	T-Pain; Cameron	4:30
16.	"Never Ever" (Mirk Radio Mix)	Harris; Jones; Williams; Dean; Jenkins; Gamble; Huff	Dean; Polow da Don; Williams; Mirk^{[c]}	5:01
Total length:				63:55

Deluxe edition bonus track
No.	Title	Writer(s)	Producer(s)	Length
15.	"I'm On"	Anesha Birchett; Antea Birchett; Harris	Chris Grayson; Khatneeb Muhammad	3:56
Total length:				58:20

US iTunes Store deluxe edition bonus videos
No.	Title	Length
16.	"Behind the Scenes in the Studio"	6:37
17.	"Behind the Scenes at Rehearsal"	4:18
18.	"Behind the Scenes at the Photo Shoot & with the Illustrator"	6:22
19.	"Making of: Go Girl"	5:54
20.	"Making of: Never Ever"	3:53
21.	"Making of: Love Sex Magic"	10:37
Total length:		56:09

International streaming deluxe edition bonus track
No.	Title	Writer(s)	Producer(s)	Length
16.	"Love Sex Magic" (Versatile Radio Mix)	Timberlake; Elizondo; Knox; Fauntleroy II	The Y's; Jason Nevins^{[C]}	4:07
Total length:				62:27

International digital store deluxe edition bonus track
No.	Title	Writer(s)	Producer(s)	Length
16.	"Never Ever" (Mike D Radio Remix)	Harris; Jones; Williams; Dean; Jenkins; Gamble; Huff	Dean; Polow da Don; Williams; Mike D^{[c]}	4:03

International Amazon MP3 deluxe edition bonus tracks
No.	Title	Writer(s)	Producer(s)	Length
17.	"When I"	Barthe; Gibson	Dreshan "Champ Champ" Smith	4:03

Japanese deluxe edition bonus tracks
No.	Title	Writer(s)	Producer(s)	Length
16.	"Go Girl" (featuring T-Pain)	Najm; Balfour; Cameron; Harris	T-Pain; Cameron	4:30
17.	"Never Ever" (Mirk Radio Mix)	Harris; Jones; Williams; Dean; Jenkins; Gamble; Huff	Dean; Polow da Don; Williams; Mirk^{[c]}	5:01
18.	"Love Sex Magic" (Electric Bounce Remix)	Timberlake; Elizondo; Knox; Fauntleroy II	The Y's; Jason Nevins^{[C]}	3:12
Total length:				71:11

Latin American Amazon MP3 and international iTunes Store deluxe edition
No.	Title	Writer(s)	Producer(s)	Length
16.	"Fit of Love"	Frankie Storm; Harris	Reggie "Syience" Perry	3:18
17.	"Never Ever" (Mike D Radio Remix)	Harris; Jones; Williams; Dean; Jenkins; Gamble; Huff	Dean; Polow da Don; Williams; Mike D^{[c]}	4:03
18.	"When I"	Barthe; Gibson	Dreshan "Champ Champ" Smith	4:03
Total length:				69:52

International iTunes Store extended version
No.	Title	Writer(s)	Producer(s)	Length
16.	"Never Ever" (Mike D Radio Remix)	Harris; Jones; Williams; Dean; Jenkins; Gamble; Huff	Dean; Polow da Don; Williams; Mike D^{[c]}	4:03
17.	"Behind the Scenes in the Studio"			6:37
18.	"Behind the Scenes at Rehearsal"			4:18
19.	"Behind the Scenes at the Photo Shoot & with the Illustrator"			6:22
20.	"Making of: Go Girl"			5:54
21.	"Making of: Never Ever"			3:53
22.	"Making of: Love Sex Magic"			10:37
Total length:				1:00:12

Deluxe edition – Inside the Fantasy DVD
No.	Title	Content type	Length
1.	"The Photoshoot"	behind the scenes footage	6:23
2.	"In the Studio"	behind the scenes footage	6:38
3.	"At Rehearsal"	behind the scenes footage	4:19
4.	"The Making of Love Sex Magic"	behind the scenes footage	10:38
5.	"Love Sex Magic" (featuring Justin Timberlake)	music video	3:41
6.	"The Making of Never Ever"	behind the scenes footage	3:54
7.	"Never Ever" (featuring Young Jeezy)	music video	5:10
8.	"The Making of Go Girl"	behind the scenes footage	5:55
9.	"Go Girl" (featuring T-Pain)	music video	4:05
Total length:			50:43

Fantasy Ride – The Mini Collection (EP)
No.	Title	Writer(s)	Producer(s)	Length
1.	"Love Sex Magic" (featuring Justin Timberlake)	Timberlake; Elizondo; Knox; Fauntleroy II	The Y's	3:40
2.	"Work" (featuring Missy Elliott)	Harris; Hills; Araica; Elliott	Danja; The Incredible Lago^{[b]}	4:05
3.	"Work" (Pokerface club edit)	Harris; Hills; Araica; Elliott	Danja; The Incredible Lago^{[b]}	4:08
4.	"Goodies" (Remix featuring T.I. and Jazze Pha)	Harris; Craig Love; Jonathan Smith; Lamarquis Jefferson; Sean Garrett; Zachary Wallis	Lil Jon; Garrett	4:21
5.	"1, 2 Step" (featuring Missy Elliott)	Harris; Elliott; Phalon Alexander	Jazze Pha; Pierre Medore	3:22
6.	"Like a Boy"	Bulewa Muhammad; Charles Kenon; Candice Nelson; Harris; Ezekiel Lewis; J. Que	Calvo Da Gr8	3:56
Total length:				23:42

Notes

- ^{^[a]} signifies a co-producer
- ^{^[b]} signifies a vocal producer
- ^{^[c]} signifies an additional production for remix

== Personnel ==
- Marcella "Ms. Lago" Araica – audio mixing (tracks 4, 6, 8), additional production (8), recording engineer (4, 8)
- Chris Athens – mastering
- Jim Beanz – vocal arrangement (track 4)
- Benjamin "Benny Blanco" Levin – drums, keyboards, programming, producer (track 12)
- Derek Blanks – photographer
- Brandon "Blade" Bowles – music producer (track 1)
- Chris Brown – vocals, vocal arrangement (track 4)
- Bernard Chang – illustrations
- Aubry Delane – assistant recording engineer (track 13)
- Carlos "Los da Mystro" McKinney – music producer (track 7)
- Mike Donaldson – recording engineer, audio mixing (track 9)
- Mike Elizondo – instrumentation (tracks 2, 10)
- Paul Foley – recording engineer (tracks 2, 10)
- Yolonda Frederick – make-up
- Serban Ghenea – audio mixing (track 12)
- Lukasz "Dr. Luke" Gottwald – guitar, drums, keyboards, music programming, production (track 12)
- Tatiana Gottwald – assistant recording engineer (track 12)
- Matty Green – audio mixing assistant (tracks 2, 10)
- Mariel Haenn – stylist
- Christy Hall – production assistant (tracks 1, 3, 5, 11)
- John Hanes – additional Pro-Tools recording engineer (track 12)
- Kuk Harrell – vocal producer (tracks 3, 5, 7, 11), vocal recording engineer (3, 5, 7, 11), mixing technician
- Rodney "Darkchild" Jerkins – music producer, audio mixing, vocal producer (track 9)
- Rob Knox – instrumentation (tracks 2, 10)
- Giancarlo Lino – audio mixing assistant (tracks 1, 5, 11)
- Carlton Lynn – recording engineer (tracks 6, 13)
- Andile Majozi – assistant
- Terius "The-Dream" Nash – songwriter (tracks 3, 5, 7, 11), co-producer (3, 5, 11), vocals (7), vocal arrangement
- Candice Nelson – songwriter, vocal arrangement (track 4)
- Jared Newcomb – audio mixing assistant (tracks 4, 6, 8)
- Osinachi Nwaneri – music producer (track 9)
- Carlos Oyanedel – audio mixing assistant (tracks 9, 13)
- Dave Pensado – audio mixing (tracks 1, 3, 5, 7, 11)
- Mark Pitts – executive producer
- Jamal "Polow da Don" Jones – producer (tracks 6, 13)
- Ramon Rivas – assistant recording engineer (track 12)
- Tim Roberts – assistant Pro-Tools recording engineer (track 12)
- Todd Rubenstein – assistant recording engineer (track 12)
- Becky Scott – production coordination (track 12)
- Kelly "Becky 4 Real" Sheehan – instrumental recording engineer (tracks 1, 3, 5, 11)
- Vanessa Silberma – production coordination (track 12)
- Gary "G" Silver – production coordination (track 12)
- Spike Stent – audio mixing (tracks 2, 10)
- Christopher "Tricky" Stewart – music producer (tracks 1, 3, 5, 11)
- Phil Tan – audio mixing (tracks 9, 13)
- Faheem "T-Pain" Najm – producer ("Go Girl")
- Brian "B Luv" Thomas – instrumental recording engineer (tracks 3, 5)
- Pat Thrall – instrumental recording engineer (tracks 1, 3)
- Randy Urbanski – audio mixing assistant (tracks 1, 3)
- Courtney Walter – art direction, design
- Elvis "Blac Elvis" Williams – producer (track 6)
- Emily Wright – recording engineer, vocal editing (track 12)
- Kiyah Wright – hair stylist
- Andrew Wuepper – audio mixing assistant (tracks 3, 5, 7, 11)

== Charts ==
=== Weekly charts ===
Weekly chart performance for Fantasy Ride
Chart (2009)	Peak position
Argentinean Albums (CAPIF)	9
Australian Albums (ARIA)	39
Austrian Albums (Ö3 Austria)	58
Belgian Albums (Ultratop Flanders)	21
Belgian Albums (Ultratop Wallonia)	36
Canadian Albums (Billboard)	22
European Top 100 Albums (Billboard)	20
French Albums (SNEP)	34
German Albums (Offizielle Top 100)	77
Irish Albums (IRMA)	10
Italian Albums (FIMI)	69
Japanese Albums (Oricon)	18
Polish Albums (ZPAV)	38
Scottish Albums (Official Charts)	17
Swiss Albums (Schweizer Hitparade)	13
Taiwanese Albums (RIT)	6
UK Albums (Official Charts)	9
UK R&B Albums (Official Charts)	2
US Billboard 200	3
US Top R&B/Hip-Hop Albums (Billboard)	2

=== Year-end charts ===
Year-end chart performance for Fantasy Ride
Chart (2009)	Position
US Billboard 200	190
US Top R&B/Hip-Hop Albums (Billboard)	51

== Release history ==
Release history for Fantasy Ride
Region	Edition	Date	Label
United Kingdom	Standard (download + bonus tracks)	May 3, 2009	RCA
United Kingdom	Standard (Single disc + bonus track)	May 4, 2009	RCA
United Kingdom	Extended (CD + DVD content)	May 5, 2009	RCA
United States	Standard (single disc); Limited (CD + DVD content)	May 5, 2009	LaFace
Canada	Standard (single disc); Limited (CD+DVD content)	May 5, 2009	Sony Music
Japan	Standard (single disc)	May 13, 2009	Sony Music Japan
Brazil	Standard (single disc)	May 15, 2009	Sony Music
Japan	Limited (CD + DVD content)	May 27, 2009	Sony Music Japan
Germany	Standard (single disc); Limited (CD + DVD content)	June 5, 2009	Sony Music
United Kingdom	The Mini Collection	July 27, 2009	RCA
