= Brian McKnight discography =

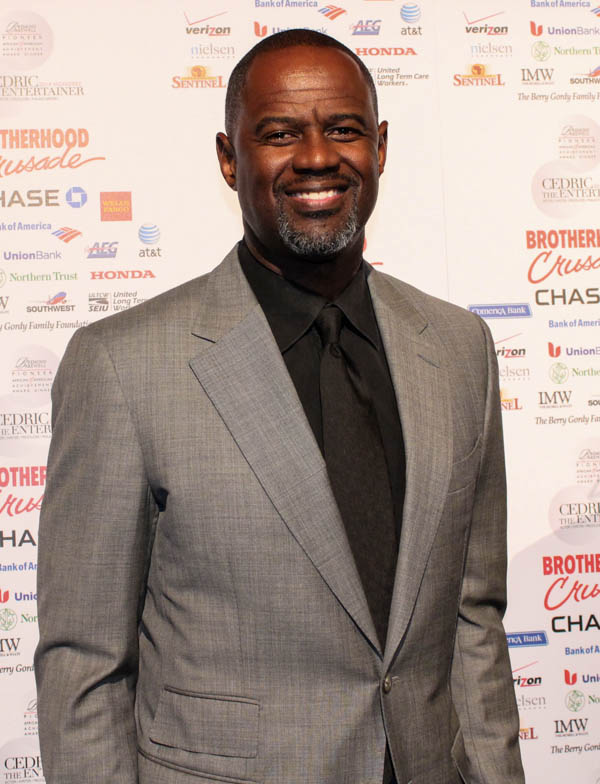
- McKnight at the 2014 Pioneer of African American Achievement Awards Gala.
- Studio albums: 16
- Live albums: 1
- Compilation albums: 6
- Singles: 40
- Music videos: 19
- Christmas albums: 2

The discography of Brian McKnight, an R&B singer, consists of 15 studio albums (including two Christmas albums), six compilation albums, more than 40 singles, and 19 music videos. McKnight has sold more than 25 million albums worldwide.

McKnight signed a record deal with Mercury Records in 1992, and released his eponymous debut album in the same year. In the United States, Brian McKnight peaked at number fifty-eight on the Billboard 200, peaked at number seventeen on the Top R&B/Hip-Hop Albums, and was certified platinum by the Recording Industry Association of America (RIAA). The album produced four singles, all which charted above fifty in the Hot R&B/Hip Hop Songs. McKnight's second studio album, I Remember You, was released in 1995. It peaked at number twenty-two on the US Billboard 200 and reached at number four on the Top R&B/Hip-Hop Albums. It was certified gold by the RIAA and produced three singles, all which charted above twenty-five in the Hot R&B/Hip Hop Songs. McKnight's final record with Mercury was his third studio album, Anytime (1997). It peaked at number thirteen on the US Billboard 200, became his first record to top the Top R&B/Hip-Hop Albums. It was certified double platinum by the RIAA, and produced four singles, three of which charted above fifteen in the Hot R&B/Hip Hop Songs.

McKnight followed with the release of the Christmas album, Bethlehem (1998), his first record for Motown Records. His fifth studio album, Back at One, was released in 1999 and saw him further transitioning from urban adult contemporary into the hip hop soul market. It sold 144,000 units in its first week of release, reaching number seven on the US Billboard 200. McKnight's most successful album to date, it sold more than 3.0 million copies worldwide and was certified triple platinum by the Recording Industry Association of America (RIAA) and platinum by Music Canada. The album produced three singles, including its title track which reached number two in the US. McKnight followed this with his sixth studio album, Superhero, released in 2001. It debuted at number seven on the US Billboard 200, moving 153,000 units in its first week to McKnight's biggest first week sales. However, it failed to duplicate the multi-platinum success of Back at One, going gold. McKnight followed with the release of his first compilation album, From There to Here: 1989-2002 (2002), which peaked at number sixty-two on the Billboard 200 and number 21 on the Top R&B/Hip-Hop Albums. In 2003 and 2005, McKnight released the studio albums, U-Turn and Gemini, respectively. While they became top ten hits on the Billboard 200, they were less successful, with only U-Turn certified gold by the RIAA.

Following a label change, McKnight released his ninth studio album, Ten, on Warner Bros. Records in 2006. It peaked at number 32 on the Billboard 200, becoming his lowest-charting single album since his debut album. McKnight followed with the release of the compilation albums Gold (2007) and 20th Century Masters: The Millennium Collection - The Best of Brian McKnight (2007), which peaked at number sixty-five on the Top R&B/Hip-Hop Albums. McKnight also released his second Christmas album, I'll Be Home for Christmas (2008) via Razor & Tie, which peaked at number twenty-two on the Top R&B/Hip-Hop Albums. In 2009, he signed with E1 Music and produced his eleventh studio album, Evolution of a Man, in 2009. It entered the top twenty of the Billboard 200 and peaked at number three on the Top R&B/Hip-Hop Albums chart. This was followed by Just Me in 2011 and More Than Words in 2013. McKnight's fourteenth studio album, Better, was self-released in 2016. It became his first regular studio album to miss the Billboard 200 and reached number 23 on the Top R&B/Hip-Hop Albums. Also in 2016, SoNo Recording Group released his first live album An Evening with Brian McKnight. It peaked at number 29 on the Top R&B/Hip-Hop Albums. SoNo also released McKnight's fifteenth studio album, Genesis in 2017. It entered the top twenty of the Independent Albums chart.

== Albums ==
=== Studio albums ===
List of studio albums, with selected chart positions
| Title | Album details | Peak chart positions | | | | | | | Sales | Certifications |
| Title | Album details | US | US R&B | AUS | CAN | FRA | NL | UK | Sales | Certifications |
|---|---|---|---|---|---|---|---|---|---|---|
| Brian McKnight | Released: June 23, 1992; Label: Mercury; Format: CD, CS | 58 | 17 | — | — | — | — | — | | RIAA: Platinum |
| I Remember You | Released: August 8, 1995; Label: Mercury; Format: CD, CS | 22 | 4 | — | — | — | — | — | | RIAA: Gold |
| Anytime | Released: September 23, 1997; Label: Mercury; Format: CD, CS | 13 | 1 | — | 65 | — | — | 48 | | RIAA: 2× Platinum |
| Bethlehem | Released: October 20, 1998; Label: Motown; Format: CD, CS | 95 | 33 | — | — | — | — | — | | |
| Back at One | Released: September 21, 1999; Label: Motown; Format: CD, CS, LP | 7 | 2 | 56 | 19 | — | 55 | — | | RIAA: 3× Platinum; MC: Platinum |
| Superhero | Released: August 28, 2001; Label: Motown; Format: CD, CS | 7 | 4 | — | — | — | — | — | US: 870,000 | RIAA: Gold |
| U Turn | Released: March 25, 2003; Label: Motown; Format: CD, CS | 7 | 4 | — | — | 148 | — | — | | RIAA: Gold |
| Gemini | Released: February 8, 2005; Label: Motown; Format: CD, CS | 4 | 2 | — | — | 97 | 82 | — | | |
| Ten | Released: December 5, 2006; Label: Warner Bros.; Format: CD, CS | 32 | 4 | — | — | — | — | — | | |
| I'll Be Home for Christmas | Released: October 7, 2008; Label: Razor & Tie; Format: CD, digital | 109 | 22 | — | — | — | — | — | | |
| Evolution of a Man | Released: October 27, 2009; Label: Hard Work International / E1; Format: CD, digital | 20 | 3 | — | — | — | — | — | | |
| Just Me | Released: July 12, 2011; Label: Mr. Sloane / E1; Format: CD, digital | 39 | 8 | — | — | — | — | — | US: 47,000 | |
| More Than Words | Released: March 19, 2013; Label: Mr. Sloane / E1; Format: CD, digital | 64 | 10 | — | — | — | — | — | US: 26,000 | |
| Better | Released: February 26, 2016; Label: Brian McKnight Music LLC; Format: CD, digital | — | 23 | — | — | — | — | — | | |
| Genesis | Released: August 25, 2017; Label: SoNo; Format: CD, digital | — | — | — | — | — | — | — | | |
| Exodus | Released: June 26, 2020; Label: SoNo; Format: CD, digital | — | — | — | — | — | — | — | | |
| McKnighttime Lullabies | Released: October 20, 2023; Label: SoNo; Format: CD, digital | — | — | — | — | — | — | — | | |
"—" denotes releases that did not chart or was not released in that territory.

=== Live albums ===
List of Live albums, with selected chart positions
| Title | Album details | Peak chart positions |
| Title | Album details | US R&B |
|---|---|---|
| An Evening with Brian McKnight | Released: September 23, 2016; Label: SoNo; Format: CD, digital | 29 |

=== Compilation albums ===
List of compilation albums, with selected chart positions
| Title | Album details | Peak chart positions | |
| Title | Album details | US | US R&B |
|---|---|---|---|
| From There to Here: 1989–2002 | Released: November 5, 2002; Label: Motown; Format: CD, CS | 62 | 21 |
| Gold | Released: January 30, 2007; Label: Hip-O; Format: CD, digital | — | — |
| 20th Century Masters: The Millennium Collection - The Best of Brian McKnight | Released: October 23, 2007; Label: Motown; Format: CD | — | 65 |
| Ultimate Collection | Released: February 17, 2009; Label: Universal Catalog; Format: CD | — | — |
| Icon: Love Songs | Released: January 4, 2011; Label: Motown; Format: CD | — | — |
| Greatest Hits | Released: April 15, 2014; Label: E1; Format: CD, digital | — | — |
"—" denotes releases that did not chart.

== Singles ==
=== As main artist ===
List of singles, with selected chart positions and certifications, showing year released and album name
| Title | Year | Peak chart positions | | | | | | Certifications | Album |
| Title | Year | US | US R&B | AUS | CAN | NL | UK | Certifications | Album |
|---|---|---|---|---|---|---|---|---|---|
| "The Way Love Goes" | 1992 | — | 11 | — | — | — | — | | Brian McKnight |
| "Goodbye My Love" | 1992 | — | 46 | — | — | — | — | | Brian McKnight |
| "I Can't Go for That" | 1992 | — | — | — | — | — | — | | Brian McKnight |
| "Love Is" (duet with Vanessa Williams) | 1993 | 3 | 55 | 49 | 3 | — | 92 | | Beverly Hills 90210 OST |
| "One Last Cry" | 1993 | 13 | 8 | — | 53 | — | — | | Brian McKnight |
| "After the Love" | 1993 | — | 39 | — | — | — | — | | Brian McKnight |
| "Crazy Love" | 1995 | 45 | 10 | — | — | — | — | | I Remember You |
| "On the Down Low" | 1995 | 73 | 12 | — | — | — | — | | I Remember You |
| "Still in Love" | 1995 | —^{[A]} | 24 | — | — | — | — | | I Remember You |
| "When We Were Kings" (duet with Diana King) | 1997 | — | — | — | — | — | — | | When We Were Kings OST |
| "You Should Be Mine (Don't Waste Your Time)" (featuring Mase) | 1997 | 17 | 4 | — | — | — | 36 | | Anytime |
| "Anytime" | 1997 | — | — | — | 20 | — | 48 | | Anytime |
| "The Only One for Me" | 1998 | — | — | — | — | — | — | | Anytime |
| "Hold Me" (featuring Tone & Kobe Bryant) | 1998 | 35 | 12 | — | — | — | — | | Anytime |
| "Back at One" | 1999 | 2 | 7 | 24 | 4 | 33 | — | RIAA: Gold | Back at One |
| "Stay or Let It Go" | 2000 | 76 | 26 | — | — | — | — | | Back at One |
| "6, 8, 12" | 2000 | —^{[B]} | 48 | 97 | — | — | — | | Back at One |
| "Win" | 2000 | —^{[C]} | 51 | — | — | — | — | | Men of Honor OST |
| "Love of My Life" | 2001 | 51 | 11 | — | — | — | — | | Superhero |
| "Still" | 2002 | —^{[D]} | — | — | — | — | — | | Superhero |
| "What's It Gonna Be" (featuring Jermaine Dupri) | 2002 | 91 | 48 | — | — | — | — | | Superhero |
| "Let Me Love You" | 2002 | — | 102 | — | — | — | — | | From There to Here: 1989–2002 |
| "Shoulda, Woulda, Coulda" | 2003 | —^{[E]} | 35 | — | — | — | — | | U Turn |
| "All Night Long" (featuring Nelly) | 2003 | — | 121 | — | — | — | — | | U Turn |
| "What We Do Here" | 2004 | —^{[F]} | 35 | — | — | — | — | | Gemini |
| "Everytime You Go Away" | 2005 | —^{[G]} | 36 | — | — | — | — | | Gemini |
| "Grown Man Business" | 2005 | — | — | — | — | — | — | | Gemini |
| "Find Myself in You" | 2006 | —^{[H]} | 27 | — | — | — | — | | Ten |
| "Used to Be My Girl" | 2006 | —^{[I]} | 25 | — | — | — | — | | Ten |
| "What's My Name" | 2007 | — | 33 | — | — | — | — | | Ten |
| "Angels We Have Heard on High" (duet with Josh Groban) | 2007 | — | — | — | — | — | — | | I'll Be Home for Christmas |
| "I'll Be Home for Christmas" | 2008 | — | — | — | — | — | — | | I'll Be Home for Christmas |
| "The Christmas Song" | 2008 | — | 57 | — | — | — | — | | I'll Be Home for Christmas |
| "What I've Been Waiting For" | 2009 | — | 28 | — | — | — | — | | Evolution of a Man |
| "Little Drummer Boy" | 2009 | — | — | — | — | — | — | | Non-album single |
| "Just a Little Bit" | 2010 | — | 85 | — | — | — | — | | Evolution of a Man |
| "Fall 5.0" | 2011 | — | 54 | — | — | — | — | | Just Me |
| "Temptation" (featuring Brian McKnight Jr.) | 2011 | — | 86 | — | — | — | — | | Just Me |
| "iFUrReady2Learn" | 2012 | — | — | — | — | — | — | | Non-album single |
| "Sweeter" | 2013 | — | — | — | — | — | — | | More Than Words |
| "4th of July" | 2013 | — | — | — | — | — | — | | More Than Words |
| "Uh Oh Feeling" | 2015 | — | — | — | — | — | — | | Better |
| "Better" | 2016 | — | — | — | — | — | — | | Better |
| "Everything" | 2016 | — | — | — | — | — | — | | An Evening with Brian McKnight / Genesis |
| "Forever" | 2017 | — | — | — | — | — | — | | An Evening with Brian McKnight / Genesis |
| "I Want U" | 2017 | — | — | — | — | — | — | | Genesis |
| "10 Million Stars" | 2017 | — | — | — | — | — | — | | Genesis |
| "42 (Grown Up Tipsy)" | 2018 | — | — | — | — | — | — | | Exodus |
| "When I'm Gone" | 2019 | — | — | — | — | — | — | | Exodus |
| "Neva Get Enuf of U" | 2019 | — | — | — | — | — | — | | Exodus |
| "Nobody" | 2020 | — | — | — | — | — | — | | Exodus |
| "Bad" | 2020 | — | — | — | — | — | — | | Exodus |
| "Faithfully" | 2021 | — | — | — | — | — | — | | Non-album single |
| "Rainbow Connection" | 2023 | — | — | — | — | — | — | | McKnighttime Lullabies |
| "Baby Instructions" | 2023 | — | — | — | — | — | — | | McKnighttime Lullabies |
"—" denotes items which were not released in that country or failed to chart.

=== As featured artist ===
List of singles, with selected chart positions, showing year released
| Title | Year | Peak chart positions | | Album |
| Title | Year | US | US R&B | Album |
|---|---|---|---|---|
| "Let It Snow" (Boyz II Men featuring Brian McKnight) | 1993 | 32 | 17 | Christmas Interpretations |
| "I'll Take Her" (Ill Al Skratch featuring Brian McKnight) | 1994 | 62 | 16 | Creep wit' Me |
| "Just the Two of Us (Rodney Jerkins Remix)" (Will Smith featuring Brian McKnight) | 1998 | 20 | — | Big Willie Style |
| "Coming Back Home" (BeBe featuring Brian McKnight & Joe) | 2000 | — | 61 | Love & Freedom |
| "Back to One" (Ivete Sangalo featuring Brian McKnight) | 2002 | — | — | Festa |
| "To You" (Earth, Wind & Fire featuring Brian McKnight) | 2006 | — | 71 | Illumination |
| "Addicted" (Juvenile featuring Brian McKnight) | 2006 | — | — | Reality Check |
| "Mais Fácil" (Easier) (Sorriso Maroto featuring Brian McKnight) | 2013 | — | — | Riscos e Certezas |
| "My Heart" (Kyla featuring Brian McKnight) | 2014 | — | — | Journey |
| "Summertime in NYC" (Dave Koz featuring Brian McKnight) | 2020 | — | — | "—" denotes releases that did not chart. |

== Other charted songs ==
List of songs, with selected chart positions
| Title | Year | Peak chart positions | Album |
| Title | Year | US R&B | Album |
|---|---|---|---|
| "Home" | 2000 | 125 | Back at One |
| "Back Seat (Getting Down)" | 2004 | 119 | U Turn |

== Guest appearances ==
List of non-single guest appearances, with other performing artists, showing year released and album name
| Title | Year | Other performer(s) | Album |
|---|---|---|---|
| "Let It Snow" | 1993 | Boyz II Men | Christmas Interpretations |
| "I'll Take Her" | 1994 | Ill Al Skratch | Creep wit' Me |
| "Moody's Mood for Love" | 1995 | Rachelle Ferrell, Take 6 and James Moody | Q's Jook Joint |
| "Because of His Love" | 1996 | Jermaine Dupri | 12 Soulful Nights of Christmas |
| "Whenever You Call" | 1998 | Mariah Carey | #1's |
| "Coming Back Home" | 1999 | BeBe & Joe | Love & Freedom |
| "Back To One" | 2002 | Ivete Sangalo | Festa |
| "All The Way" | 2002 | Kenny G | Paradise |
| "Careless Whisper" | 2004 | Kenny G | At Last...The Duets Album |
| "To You" | 2005 | Earth, Wind and Fire | Illumination |
| "Addicted" | 2006 | Juvenile | Reality Check |
| "Angels We Have Heard on High" | 2007 | Josh Groban | Noël |
| "End of the Road" (Acapella) | 2007 | Boyz II Men | Motown: A Journey Through Hitsville USA |
| "What's Going On" | 2008 | Take 6 | The Standard |
| "Can't Play It Cool" | 2013 | Sheléa | Love Fell on Me |
| "My Heart" | 2014 | Kyla | Journey |
| "I Love My Life With You" | 2024 | Jeff Lorber | Elevate |

== Soundtrack appearances ==
List of soundtrack songs, with other performers, showing year released and soundtrack name
| Song | Year | Other artist(s) | Soundtrack |
|---|---|---|---|
| "Love Is" | 1993 | Vanessa Williams | Beverly Hills, 90210 OST |
| "Night People" | 1993 | —N/a | Addams Family Values |
| "The Star-Spangled Banner" | 1995 | Boys Choir of Harlem and Slash | Panther |
| "Remember The Magic" | 1996 | —N/a | Walt Disney World 25th Anniversary |
| "When We Were Kings" | 1997 | —N/a | When We Were Kings |
| "Father" | 1998 | —N/a | The Prince of Egypt |
| "Discovery" | 1999 | —N/a | Life |
| "Thinkin' 'Bout Me" | 2000 | —N/a | Nutty Professor II: The Klumps |
| "Win" | 2000 | —N/a | Men of Honor |
| "I Believe" | 2001 | —N/a | Daddy's Little Girls |
| "I Wish It Would Rain Down" | 2001 | Monique S.V. | Urban Renewal |

== Production discography ==
List of production and non-performing songwriting credits for other artists (excluding guest appearances, interpolations, and samples)
| Track(s) | Year | Credit | Artist(s) | Album |
|---|---|---|---|---|
| 4. "You Gotta Go"; (featuring Brian McKnight) | 1991 | Producer (with Gerry Brown and Dr. Jam), arranger | Vanessa Williams | The Comfort Zone |
| 10. "Love All the Hurt Way" | 1992 | Producer (with Tim Miner), keyboards, backing vocals | Tim Miner | Tim Miner |
| 4. "Love Is" | 1992 | Producer (with Gerry Brown and Vanessa Williams) | Vanessa Williams, Brian McKnight | Various artists – Beverly Hills, 90210: The Soundtrack |
| 1. "I'll Be Good to You" | 1993 | Songwriter | George Benson | Love Remembers |
| 2. "Over & Over" | 1993 | Producer | Vesta Williams | Everything-N-More |
| 8. "Can't Let Go" | 1993 | Producer | Vesta Williams | Everything-N-More |
| All tracks | 1993 | Producer | Boyz II Men | Christmas Interpretations |
| 5. "Forever In My Heart" | 1994 | Producer | CeCe Peniston | Thought 'Ya Knew |
| 2. "I Can't Let You Go" | 1994 | Producer | Cindy Mizelle | Cindy Mizelle |
| 10. "The Harder I Try" | 1994 | Producer, strings, keyboards | For Real | It's a Natural Thang |
| 3. "Here with Me" | 1994 | Producer (with Robert Brookins), backing vocals, vocal arrangement | Philip Bailey | Philip Bailey |
| 5. "I'm Ready" | 1994 | Producer (with Robert Brookins), backing vocals, vocal arrangement | Philip Bailey | Philip Bailey |
| 8. "Crazy Things You Do For Love" | 1994 | Producer (with Robert Brookins), backing vocals, vocal arrangement | Philip Bailey | Philip Bailey |
| 11. "Call Me" | 1994 | Producer (with Robert Brookins), backing vocals, vocal arrangement | Philip Bailey | Philip Bailey |
| 8. "Lost Inside of You" | 1994 | Producer | Damion Hall | Straight to the Point |
| 9. "Never Enough" | 1994 | Producer | Damion Hall | Straight to the Point |
| 10. "Second Chance" | 1994 | Producer | Damion Hall | Straight to the Point |
| 6. "The Color of the Night (Instrumental version)" | 1994 | Producer | Dominic Frontiere | Color of Night |
| 8. "Biggest Part of Me" | 1994 | Producer | Take 6 | Join the Band |
| 14. "Fallin'" | 1994 | Producer | Boyz II Men | II |
| 1. "U Will Know" | 1994 | Producer (with D'Angelo) | Black Men United | Various artists – Jason's Lyric (The Original Motion Picture Soundtrack) |
| 4. "Do You Know" | 1994 | Co-producer (with Boyz II Men) | Boyz II Men | Various artists – Motown Comes Home |
| "Share Love" | 1994 | Producer | Boyz II Men | Non-album single (Note: Non-album promotional single) |
| 2. "Learning to Love Again" | 1995 | Producer | Christopher Williams | Not a Perfect Man |
| 17. "Star-Spangled Banner" | 1995 | Producer | Brian McKnight, Boys Choir of Harlem | Various artists – Panther: The Motion Picture Soundtrack |
| 11. "Until the End of Time" | 1995 | Songwriter | Jordan Hill | Jordan Hill |
| 5. "What It's Like" | 1995 | Producer | U.N.V. | Universal Nubian Voices |
| 9. "First Time" | 1995 | Producer | U.N.V. | Universal Nubian Voices |
| 11. "One More Try" | 1995 | Producer | U.N.V. | Universal Nubian Voices |
| 12. "You" | 1995 | Producer | Wayman Tisdale | Power Forward |
| 8. "Through My Heart (The Arrow)" | 1996 | Producer | Az Yet | Az Yet |
| 3. "I'll Be There" | 1996 | Producer | Take 6 | Brothers |
| 4. "Delilah" | 1996 | Producer | Take 6 | Brothers |
| 8. "We Don't Have to Cry" | 1996 | Producer | Take 6 | Brothers |
| 10. "Don't Let Go" | 1996 | Producer | Take 6 | Brothers |
| 3. "Every Beat of My Heart" | 1996 | Songwriter | Johnny Mathis | All About Love |
| 3. "Still In Love (Live)" | 1996 | Songwriter | Vernie Bennett | Single – "Secrets (UK CD1 - CDEMS459)" |
| 2. "Christmas Without You" | 1996 | Producer | Xscape | Jermaine Dupri Presents: 12 Soulful Nights of Christmas |
| 8. "Because of His Love" | 1996 | Producer | Brian McKnight | Jermaine Dupri Presents: 12 Soulful Nights of Christmas |
| 4. "Rest of My Life"; (featuring Brian McKnight) | 1997 | Producer | Peter Andre | Time |
| 5. "Letting You Go" | 1997 | Producer | Peter Andre | Time |
| 11. "Everybody Ought to Know" | 1998 | Songwriter | Take 6 | So Cool |
| 8. "When Can I See You Again" | 1999 | Producer | Chico DeBarge | The Game |
| 11. "For the Rest of My Life" | 2000 | Songwriter | BeBe Winans | Love & Freedom |
| 9. "Goodbye" | 2001 | Producer | Alicia Keys | Songs In A Minor |
| 12. "Never Felt This Way (Interlude)" | 2001 | Songwriter | Alicia Keys | Songs In A Minor |
| 7. "Home" | 2001 | Songwriter | Joy Williams | Joy Williams |
| 10. "Selfish" | 2001 | Producer | NSYNC | Celebrity |
| 2. "Condition of My Heart" | 2002 | Songwriter | Fly to the Sky | Sea of Love |
| 9. "All the Way"; (featuring Brian McKnight) | 2002 | Producer | Kenny G | Paradise |
| 13. "Just Try" | 2002 | Songwriter | Jennifer Love-Hewitt | BareNaked (UK and Japanese edition) |
| 13. "Never Again" | 2002 | Producer | Justin Timberlake | Justified |
| 13. "One Last Thing" | 2003 | Producer | Dave Koz | Saxophonic |
| 10. "Maybe Just Maybe" | 2004 | Producer | Lemar | Time to Grow |
| 4. "Wait" | 2004 | Producer | Guy Sebastian | Beautiful Life |
| 12. "To You"; (featuring Brian McKnight) | 2005 | Producer, arranger | Earth, Wind & Fire | Illumination |
| 7. "Christmas Time Is Here" | 2005 | Producer | Brian McKnight | Various artists – 40 Years: A Charlie Brown Christmas |
| 11. "La Razón Eres Tú (Look What You Make Me Do"; (featuring Brian McKnight) | 2005 | Producer | Sin Bandera | Mañana |
| 16. "Addicted"; (featuring Brian McKnight) | 2006 | Producer | Juvenile | Reality Check |
| Film score | 2007 | Composer | —N/a | Daddy's Little Girl |
| 7. "I Believe" | 2007 | Producer | Brian McKnight | Various artists – Daddy's Little Girl (Music Inspired by the Film) |
| 6. "Stay with Me" | 2007 | Producer, arranger, backing vocals, keyboards, rhythm guitar | Norman Brown | Stay with Me |
| 5. "You" | 2007 | Producer, programmer | Wayman Tisdale | The Very Best Of… |
| 6. "Forever In My Heart"; (featuring Brian McKnight) | 2019 | Producer (with Damon Elliott) | Dionne Warwick | She's Back |

== Music videos ==
List of music videos, showing year released and director
| Title | Year | Director(s) |
|---|---|---|
| "Goodbye My Love" | 1992 | Antoine Fuqua |
| "One Last Cry" | 1992 | Leta Warner |
| "Let It Snow" (with Boyz II Men) | 1993 | Lionel C. Martin |
| "I'll Take Her" | 1994 | Brett Ratner |
| "Crazy Love" | 1994 | Lionel C. Martin |
| "Anytime" | 1997 | Darren Grant |
| "You Should Be Mine (Don't Waste Your Time)" | 1997 | Darren Grant |
| "The Only One for Me" | 1997 | Billie Woodruff |
| "Hold Me" | 1998 | Darren Grant |
| "6, 8, 12" | 1999 | Christopher Erskin |
| "Back at One" | 1999 | Milton Lage |
| "Back at One" (Brazilian Version) | 1999 | Francis Lawrence |
| "Stay or Let It Go" | 1999 | Paul Hunter |
| "Coming Back Home" | 2000 | Billie Woodruff |
| "Still" | 2001 | Thom Oilphant |
| "What's It Gonna Be" | 2001 | Antti J |
| "Let Me Love You" | 2002 | Unknown |
| "All Night Long" | 2003 | Frank Sacramento |
| "The Christmas Song" | 2008 | Unknown |

== Notes ==
- A "Still in Love" did not enter the Billboard Hot 100 but peaked at number 3 on Bubbling Under Hot 100 Singles, which acts as a 25-song extension to the Hot 100.
- B "6, 8, 12" did not enter the Billboard Hot 100 but peaked at number 8 on Bubbling Under Hot 100 Singles, which acts as a 25-song extension to the Hot 100.
- C "Win" did not enter the Billboard Hot 100 but peaked at number twenty-five on Bubbling Under Hot 100 Singles, which acts as a 25-song extension to the Hot 100.
- D "Still" did not enter the Billboard Hot 100 but peaked at number fifteen on Bubbling Under Hot 100 Singles, which acts as a 25-song extension to the Hot 100.
- E "Shoulda, Woulda, Coulda" did not enter the Billboard Hot 100 but peaked at number six on Bubbling Under Hot 100 Singles, which acts as a 25-song extension to the Hot 100.
- F "What We Do Here" did not enter the Billboard Hot 100 but peaked at number twelve on Bubbling Under Hot 100 Singles, which acts as a 25-song extension to the Hot 100.
- G "Everytime You Go Away" did not enter the Billboard Hot 100 but peaked at number eleven on Bubbling Under Hot 100 Singles, which acts as a 25-song extension to the Hot 100.
- H "Find Myself in You" did not enter the Billboard Hot 100 but peaked at number nine on Bubbling Under Hot 100 Singles, which acts as a 25-song extension to the Hot 100.
- I "Used to Be My Girl" did not enter the Billboard Hot 100 but peaked at number fourteen on Bubbling Under Hot 100 Singles, which acts as a 25-song extension to the Hot 100.
