= From There to Here: 1989–2002 =

Compilation album by Brian McKnight
- Released: November 5, 2002
- Recorded: 1989–2002
- Genre: R&B
- Length: 63:05
- Label: Motown
- Producer: Brian McKnight

Brian McKnight chronology
Superhero (2001)	From There to Here: 1989–2002 (2002)	U-Turn (2003)

From There to Here: 1989–2002 is a compilation album by American singer Brian McKnight. It was released Motown Records on November 5, 2002, in the United States, following the release of his first two top-ten albums, 1999's Back at One and 2001's Superhero. This album covers McKnight's first six albums, with two new songs, "Let Me Love You" and "The Way I Do". Upon its release, it peaked at number 62 on the Billboard 200 and number 21 on the Top R&B/Hip-Hop Albums chart. Previously unrelease song "Let Me Love You" was the only single released from the compilation.

== Critical reception ==
Professional ratings
Review scores
Source	Rating
AllMusic	4/5 stars
The Rolling Stone Album Guide	3.5/5 stars

John Bush from AllMusic fund that a "the song selections are quite good, ably showing McKnight's technically perfect and artistically pleasing voice to good effect. What makes this a better compilation than ones on most other artists is the fact that Brian McKnight albums tended to have far too much filler to justify getting into the records on their own."

== Track listing ==
No.	Title	Writer(s)	Length
1.	"Let Me Love You"	Brian McKnight	3:47
2.	"The Way Love Goes"	Brian McKnight, Brandon Barnes	4:37
3.	"One Last Cry"	Brian McKnight, Brandon Barnes, Melanie Barnes	4:55
4.	"Love Is" (featuring Vanessa Williams)	Tonio K, Michael Caruso, John Keller	4:27
5.	"Crazy Love"	Van Morrison	4:03
6.	"On The Down Low"	Brian McKnight	3:26
7.	"Still in Love"	Brian McKnight	3:57
8.	"Anytime"	Brian McKnight, Brandon Barnes	4:09
9.	"The Only One For Me"	Brian McKnight	3:32
10.	"You Should Be Mine (Don't Waste Your Time)" (featuring Mase)	Brian McKnight, Kelly Price, Sean Combs, Mason Betha, Lawrence Ronald Anthony, Jordan, Steven Aaron, James Brown	4:14
11.	"Back At One"	Brian McKnight	4:23
12.	"6, 8, 12"	Brian McKnight, Brandon Barnes	4:04
13.	"Love Of My Life"	Brian McKnight	4:45
14.	"Home"	Brian McKnight	4:21
15.	"The Way I Do" (featuring Mr. Cheeks & Baby)	Brian McKnight, Mario Winans, Jack Knight, Michael Carlos Jones, Terrance Cocheeks Kelly, Bryan Williams	4:25

== Charts ==
Chart (2002)	Peak position
US Billboard 200	62
US Top R&B/Hip-Hop Albums (Billboard)	21
