= Gold (Brian McKnight album) =

Greatest hits album by Brian McKnight
- Released: 2007
- Recorded: 1988–2007
- Genre: R&B
- Label: Hip-O

Brian McKnight chronology
From There to Here: 1989-2002 (2006)	Gold (2007)	I'll Be Home for Christmas (2008)

Professional ratings
Review scores
Source	Rating
AllMusic	4.5/5 stars

Gold is a two-disc compilation album by American singer Brian McKnight that was released on the Hip-O Records label in 2007. The compilation is intended to be a career-spanning retrospective, and no fewer than two songs are selected from each of McKnight's albums. Songs range from his first album, Brian McKnight and span all the way through to his 2006 hit, Ten.

== Track listing ==
=== Disc one ===
1. "The Way Love Goes"
2. "One Last Cry"
3. "After the Love"
4. "I'll Take Her"
5. "On the Down Low"
6. "Crazy Love"
7. "Every Beat of My Heart"
8. "Still in Love"
9. "Anytime"
10. "You Should Be Mine (Don't Waste Your Time)"
11. "Hold Me"
12. "The Only One for Me"
13. "Whenever You Call"
14. "Distant Lover"

=== Disc two ===
1. "Back at One"
2. "Stay or Let It Go"
3. "6, 8, 12"
4. "Home"
5. "Win"
6. "Love of My Life"
7. "Still"
8. "Over and Over Again"
9. "Shoulda, Woulda, Coulda"
10. "Where Do We Go from Here"
11. "Over"
12. "Careless Whisper"
13. "What We Do Here"
14. "Don't Lie"
15. "To You"
