= List of awards and nominations received by Brian McKnight =

Brian McKnight awards and nominations
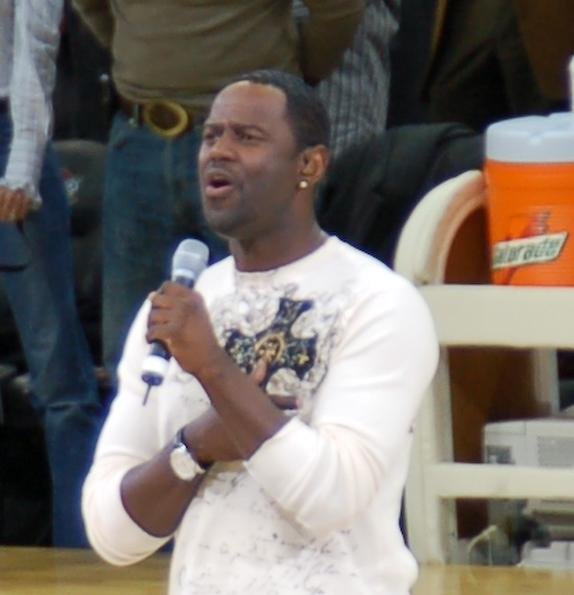
- McKnight singing the National Anthem in 2007
Awards and nominations
Award	Wins	Nominations
American Music Awards	0	1
BET	0	1
Grammy	0	16
MTV VMA	0	2
NAACP	1	3
Soul Train	1	4

Totals (Note: Certain award groups do not simply award one winner. They acknowledge several different recipients, have runners-up, and have third place. Since this is a specific recognition and is different from losing an award, runner-up mentions are considered wins in this award tally. For simplification and to avoid errors, each award in this list has been presumed to have had a prior nomination.)
- Wins: 2
- Nominations: 27

This is a complete list of awards and nominations for Brian McKnight.

== American Music Awards ==
The American Music Awards show is an annual major American music awards show.

Year	Nominee / work	Award	Result
1998	Anytime	Favorite R&B/Soul Album	Nominated

== BET Awards ==
The BET Awards were established in 2001 by the Black Entertainment Television network to celebrate African Americans and other minorities in music, acting, sports, and other fields of entertainment over the past year. The awards are presented annually and broadcast live on BET. BET commissioned artist/sculptor and hip hop culture icon Carlos Mare139 Rodriguez to design the award sculpture.

Year	Nominee / work	Award	Result
2007	Himself	BET J Cool Like Dat	Nominated

== Grammy Awards ==
A Grammy Award is an accolade by the National Academy of Recording Arts and Sciences of the United States to recognize outstanding achievement in the music industry. The annual awards ceremony features performances by prominent artists, and some of the awards of more popular interest are presented in a widely viewed televised ceremony. It is the music equivalent to the Emmy Awards for television, and the Academy Awards for film.

Year	Nominee / work	Award	Result
1994	"Love Is" (With Vanessa Williams)	Best Pop Collaboration	Nominated
1999	"Anytime"	Best Pop Vocal Performance	Nominated
1999	"The Only One for Me"	Best R&B Male Vocal Performance	Nominated
2000	"Back at One"	Best Short-Form Music Video	Nominated
2000	Back at One	Best R&B Album	Nominated
2001	"Coming Back Home" (With Bebe Winans & Joe)	Best R&B Performance by a Duo or Group	Nominated}
2001	"Stay or Let It Go"	Best R&B Male Vocal Performance	Nominated
2001	"6, 8, 12"	Best Male Pop Vocal Performance	Nominated
2002	"Love of My Life"	Best R&B Male Vocal Performance	Nominated
2002	"Love of My Life"	Best R&B Song	Nominated
2002	"My Kind of Girl" (With Justin Timberlake)	Best Pop Collaboration with Vocals	Nominated
2002	"Still"	Best Male Pop Vocal Performance	Nominated
2002	"Win"	Outstanding Song Written for a Motion Picture of Television Series	Nominated
2003	"All the Way" (With Kenny G)	Best R&B Performance by a Duo or Group	Nominated
2004	"Shoulda, Coulda, Woulda"	Best R&B Male Vocal Performance	Nominated
2005	"What We Do Here"	Best R&B Male Vocal Performance	Nominated

== MTV Video Music Awards ==
An MTV Video Music Award (commonly abbreviated as a VMA), is an award presented by the cable channel MTV to honor the best in music videos.

Year	Nominee / work	Award	Result
1998	"Anytime"	Best R&B Video	Nominated
2000	"Back at One"	Best R&B Video	Nominated

== NAACP Image Awards ==
An NAACP Image Award is an accolade presented by the American National Association for the Advancement of Colored People to honor outstanding people of color in film, television, music, and literature.

Year	Nominee / work	Award	Result
2000	"Back at One"	Outstanding Male Artist	Won
2001	"Stay or Let Go"	Outstanding Male Artist	Nominated
2002	Superhero	Outstanding Male Artist	Nominated

== Soul Train Music Awards ==
The Soul Train Music Awards is an annual award show which previously aired in national television syndication, and honors the best in Black music and entertainment. It is produced by the makers of Soul Train, the program from which it takes its name, and features musical performances by various R&B and hip hop music recording artists interspersed throughout the ceremonies.

Year	Nominee / work	Award	Result
1999	Anytime	Best R&B Male Album	Won
2000	Back at One	Best R&B Male Album	Nominated
2000	"Back at One"	Best R&B Male Single	Nominated
2002	"Love of My Life"	Best R&B Male Single	Nominated
