= Better (Brian McKnight album) =

Studio album by Brian McKnight
- Released: February 26, 2016
- Genre: R&B
- Length: 49:15
- Label: Brian McKnight Music
- Producer: Brian McKnight (also exec.)

Brian McKnight chronology
More Than Words (2013)	Better (2016)	An Evening with Brian McKnight (2016)

Better is the fourteenth studio album by American singer Brian McKnight. It was released on February 26, 2016, on his own label, Brian McKnight Music. The album features the singles "Uh Oh Feeling" and "Better".

== Critical reception ==
Professional ratings
Review scores
Source	Rating
Allmusic	3.5/5 stars
SoulTracks	favorable

In his review for Allmusic, editor Andy Kellman wrote that "Better is filled with lively songs that are well crafted but don't seem the least bit fussed over. McKnight sounds like he's having as much fun as ever, gleefully flitting from falsetto disco-funk jams to lonesome, modern country-flavored ballads." In his review for SoulTracks, Justin Kantor wrote: "Stylistically, Better demonstrates that McKnight is able to absorb a variety of influences and still sound comfortable (for the most part) within contexts outside of romantic slow-jams or funky-jazzy midtempos. Yet during that process, he sometimes loses his knack for what he does best while trying to prove his versatility. Thus, Better is, indeed, a subjective title choice for a set that surely surpasses 2013’s More Than Words in quality, but doesn’t come anywhere close to the merit of 1995’s I Remember You or 2006’s Ten."

== Track listing ==
Better — North American standard version
No.	Title	Length
1.	"Strut"	4:28
2.	"Just Enough"	3:49
3.	"Can't Take It"	4:52
4.	"Better"	3:41
5.	"Uh Oh Feeling"	3:41
6.	"Like I Do"	3:30
7.	"Lovin You from a Distance"	4:18
8.	"Goodbye" (featuring Kimie Miner)	4:23
9.	"Get You into My Life" (featuring Glasses Malone)	4:15
10.	"Enough"	3:28
11.	"Key 2 My Heart" (featuring Sixx John)	4:42
12.	"Just Waiting"	4:09

== Charts ==
Chart (2016)	Peak position
US Independent Albums (Billboard)	19
US Top R&B/Hip-Hop Albums (Billboard)	23
