= Soul Train Music Award for Best R&B/Soul Album – Male =

Annual US music award

This page lists the winners and nominees for the Soul Train Music Award for Best R&B/Soul Album – Male. The award was retired during the 2007 ceremony, but during its awarding it has had several names including Best R&B/Urban Contemporary Album – Male, Album of the Year – Male and Best Album – Male. R. Kelly has won the most awards in this category, with a total of three.

== Winners and nominees ==
Winners are listed first and highlighted in bold.

=== 1980s ===
Year	Artist	Album	Ref
1987
1987	**Luther Vandross**	**Give Me the Reason**	
1987	Freddie Jackson	Rock Me Tonight	
1987	Billy Ocean	Love Zone	
1987	Stevie Wonder	In Square Circle	
1988
1988	**Michael Jackson**	**Bad**	
1988	Alexander O'Neal	Hearsay	
1988	Prince	Sign o' the Times	
1988	Stevie Wonder	Characters	
1989
1989	**Bobby Brown**	**Don't Be Cruel**	
1989	Bobby McFerrin	Simple Pleasures	
1989	Al B. Sure	In Effect Mode	
1989	Luther Vandross	Any Love	

=== 1990s ===
Year	Artist	Album	Ref
1990
1990	**Babyface**	**Tender Lover**	
1990	Bobby Brown	Dance!...Ya Know It!	
1990	Quincy Jones	Back on the Block	
1990	Luther Vandross	The Best of Luther Vandross... The Best of Love	
1991
1991	**Johnny Gill**	**Johnny Gill**	
1991	Al B. Sure!	Private Times...and the Whole 9!	
1991	MC Hammer	Please Hammer Don't Hurt 'Em	
1991	Keith Sweat	I'll Give All My Love to You	
1992
1992	**Luther Vandross**	**Power of Love**	
1992	Will Downing	A Dream Fulfilled	
1992	Tony Terry	Tony Terry	
1992	Keith Washington	Make Time for Love	
1993
1993	**Michael Jackson**	**Dangerous**	
1993	Bobby Brown	Bobby	
1993	Tevin Campbell	T.E.V.I.N.	
1993	Brian McKnight	Brian McKnight	
1994
1994	**Babyface**	**For the Cool in You**	
1994	Tevin Campbell	I'm Ready	
1994	Prince	The Hits/The B-Sides	
1994	Luther Vandross	Never Let Me Go	
1995
1995	**Barry White**	**The Icon Is Love**	
1995	Gerald Levert	Groove On	
1995	Keith Sweat	Get Up on It	
1995	Luther Vandross	Songs	
1996
1996	**D'Angelo**	**Brown Sugar**	
1996	Michael Jackson	HIStory: Past, Present and Future, Book I	
1996	Quincy Jones	Q's Jook Joint	
1996	Brian McKnight	I Remember You	
1997
1997	**Maxwell**	**Maxwell's Urban Hang Suite**	
1997	Babyface	The Day	
1997	R. Kelly	R. Kelly	
1997	Keith Sweat	Keith Sweat	
1998
1998	**The Notorious B.I.G.**	**Life After Death**	
1998	Joe	All That I Am	
1998	Maxwell	MTV Unplugged	
1998	Prince	Emancipation	
1999
1999	**R. Kelly**	**R.**	
1999	Jay Z	Vol. 2... Hard Knock Life	
1999	Maxwell	Embrya	
1999	Will Smith	Big Willie Style	

=== 2000s ===
Year	Artist	Album	Ref
2000
2000	**Ginuwine**	**100% Ginuwine**	
2000	Eric Benét	A Day in the Life	
2000	Donell Jones	Where I Wanna Be	
2000	Brian McKnight	Back at One	
2001
2001	**R. Kelly**	**TP-2.com**	
2001	D'Angelo	Voodoo	
2001	Sisqó	Unleash the Dragon	
2001	Carl Thomas	Emotional	
2002
2002	**Usher**	**8701**	
2002	Michael Jackson	Invincible	
2002	Jaheim	Ghetto Love	
2002	Musiq	Aijuswanaseing	
2003
2003	**Musiq**	**Juslisen**	
2003	Gerald Levert	The G Spot	
2003	Jaheim	Still Ghetto	
2003	Justin Timberlake	Justified	
2004
2004	**R. Kelly**	**Chocolate Factory**	
2004	Dwele	Subject	
2004	Anthony Hamilton	Comin' From Where I'm From	
2004	Luther Vandross	Dance with My Father	
2005
2005	**Usher**	**Confessions**	
2005	R. Kelly	Happy People/U Saved Me	
2005	Musiq	Soulstar	
2005	Prince	Musicology	
2006
2006	**John Legend**	**Get Lifted**	
2006	Anthony Hamilton	Soulife	
2006	R. Kelly	TP.3 Reloaded	
2006	Charlie Wilson	Charlie, Last Name Wilson	
2007
2007	**Jamie Foxx**	**Unpredictable**	
2007	Chris Brown	Chris Brown	
2007	John Legend	Once Again	
2007	Robin Thicke	The Evolution of Robin Thicke	
