= Genesis (Brian McKnight album) =

Studio album by Brian McKnight
- Released: August 25, 2017
- Genre: R&B
- Length: 43:41
- Label: SoNo
- Producer: Claude Villani (exec.); Tim Kelley; Brian McKnight; Aaron Pearce

Brian McKnight chronology
An Evening with Brian McKnight (2016)	Genesis (2017)	Exodus (2020)

"Genesis" is the fifteenth album by American singer Brian McKnight. It was released by the SoNo Recording Group on August 25, 2017 in the United States. Primarily produced by Tim Kelley, it features the singles "I Want U" and "10 Million Stars" in addition to "Everything" and "Forever" which were first released on his previous release, the live album An Evening with Brian McKnight (2016). Genesis debuted at number 15 on the US Billboard Independent Albums, while reaching number 73 on Top Album Sales chart.

== Critical reception ==
Professional ratings
Review scores
Source	Rating
Allmusic	4/5 stars
SoulTracks	favorable

Andy Kellman from AllMusic found that "on Genesis, McKnight opts to switch it up with modern production stylings [...] Overall, this is more rooted in the electronic-oriented R&B tradition of Kashif and company than, say, an attempt to keep up with mid- to late-2010s hitmakers such as DJ Mustard and Metro Boomin." He called it "one of McKnight's best albums." SoulTracks editor Melody Charles wrote that "it’s tempting to think that Genesis signals a return to McKnight’s gospel leanings; instead, what’s happening is Brian has rediscovered, and demonstrated, his playful yet passionate side. Yes, there are modern twists and a few brow-raising couplets, but overall, Genesis harkens back to the sweetness and sensuality that attracted fans to his sound in the first place."

== Track listing ==
No.	Title	Length
1.	"Genesis (Prelude)"	1:32
2.	"I Want U"	3:26
3.	"10 Million Stars"	4:18
4.	"Hungry 4 U"	4:05
5.	"Forever"	3:37
6.	"Don't Leave"	4:16
7.	"So Damn Real"	4:21
8.	"Udonthav2blonelynomo"	4:03
9.	"Everything"	3:21
10.	"Die for Your Love"	4:01
11.	"Blow Your Mind"	3:10
12.	"Genesis"	3:35

Target bonus tracks
No.	Title	Length
13.	"Never"	3:33
14.	"All I Need"	4:17

== Charts ==
Chart (2017)	Peak position
US Independent Albums (Billboard)	15
US Top Album Sales (Billboard)	73
