= She Doesn't Know =

She Doesn't Know may refer to:

- "She Doesn't Know", a song by Inndigo Blue from the soundtrack album for the film My Rainy Days, 2009
- "She Doesn't Know", a song by Willam from the album The Wreckoning, 2012
- "She Doesn't Know", a song by Brian McKnight from the album More Than Words, 2013

== See also ==
- She Don't Know (disambiguation)
