= Exodus (Brian McKnight album) =

Studio album by Brian McKnight
- Released: June 26, 2020
- Length: 48:23
- Label: SoNo
- Producer: Earl Cohen; Tim Kelley; Brian McKnight; Chris Paultre; Claude Villani

Brian McKnight chronology
Genesis (2017)	Exodus (2020)	McKnighttime Lullabies (2023)

Exodus is the sixteenth studio album by American singer Brian McKnight. It was released by The SoNo Recording Group on June 26, 2020. While he wrote and produced most of the album himself, the singer also worked with Earl Cohen, Tim Kelley, Chris Paultre, and Claude Villani on Exodus which was preceded by the singles "42 (Grown Up Tipsy)", "When I'm Gone", and "Neva Get Enuf of U." The album debuted and peaked at number 86 on the US Billboard Current Album Sales chart. By the time of its release, McKnight announced that the album would mark his final project release of all original material though he has since release further albums.

== Critical reception ==
SoulTracks editor Justin Kantor found that Exodus, by and large, hardly comes close to living up to its title in substance and style. With a few notable exceptions, a large portion of the content goes through the motions—along with McKnight, whose abilities are such that some sub-par moments come across as at least passable. Hopefully, devotees will take the time to dig deep enough to unearth the scattering of special points where he puts that extra care into the compositions and comes up with fittingly convincing performances." Vibe's Christine Imarenezor found that "with his single Earl Cohen-produced "Nobody" and twelve other signature, love tunes on the tracklist, Exodus serves as a solid body of work."

== Chart performance ==
In the United States, Exodus debuted and peaked at number 86 on the Billboard's Current Album Sales chart in the week of July 11, 2020 .

== Track listing ==
Exodus track listing
No.	Title	Writer(s)	Producer(s)	Length
1.	"Unbelievable"	Brian McKnight	Brian McKnight; Earl Cohen; Chris Paultre; Claude Villani	3:29
2.	"Neva Get Enuf of U"	Brian McKnight	Brian McKnight; Cohen; Paultre; Villani	3:07
3.	"'42 (Grown Up Tipsy)"	Brian McKnight; Brian McKnight, Jr.	Brian McKnight; Tim Kelley	3:46
4.	"Nobody"	Brian McKnight	Brian McKnight; Cohen; Paultre; Villani	3:26
5.	"Bad"	Brian McKnight	Brian McKnight	3:47
6.	"Stay On UR Mind"	Brian McKnight	Brian McKnight	3:26
7.	"My Baby"	Brian McKnight	Brian McKnight	3:37
8.	"Hula Girl (Leilani)"	Brian McKnight	Brian McKnight	4:02
9.	"Sexy"	Brian McKnight; Niko McKnight	Brian McKnight; Cohen; Paultre; Villani	3:07
10.	"When I'm Gone"	Brian McKnight; Kelley	Brian McKnight; Kelley	4:03
11.	"Good Ol' Fashioned Love"	Brian McKnight	Brian McKnight	4:04
12.	"Can't Say Goodbye"	Brian McKnight	Brian McKnight	3:49
13.	"Fragile"	Sting	Brian McKnight; Villani	3:32
Total length:				48:23

== Charts ==
Chart performance for Exodus
Chart (2020)	Peak position
US Current Album Sales (Billboard)	86
