= She Don't Know (disambiguation) =

"She Don't Know", is a 2022 song by Jade Eagleson.

She Don't Know may also refer to:

- "She Don't Know", a song by Usher from the album Raymond v. Raymond, 2010
- "She Don't Know", a 2019 song by Millind Gaba

== See also ==
- She Doesn't Know (disambiguation)
