= Let It Snow (song) =

1993 single by Boyz II Men

Single by Boyz II Men featuring Brian McKnight

from the album Christmas Interpretations
- Released: September 28, 1993
- Recorded: 1993
- Genre: R&B; soul; christmas
- Length: 4:11
- Label: Motown
- Songwriters: Wanya Morris; Brian McKnight
- Producers: Boyz II Men; Brian McKnight

Boyz II Men singles chronology
"In the Still of the Nite (I'll Remember)" (1993)	"Let It Snow" (1993)	"I'll Make Love to You" (1994)

Brian McKnight singles chronology
"After the Love" (1993)	"Let It Snow" (1993)	"Crazy Love" (1995)

Music video
- "Let It Snow - Boyz II Men ft. Brian McKnight" on YouTube

"Let It Snow" is a song co-produced and performed by American contemporary R&B group Boyz II Men, featuring vocals from fellow American contemporary R&B singer Brian McKnight. The song was issued as the only official single from the group's first holiday album, Christmas Interpretations (1993). Written by McKnight and Boyz II Men member Wanya Morris, it peaked at numbers 32 and 45 on the US Billboard Hot 100 and Cash Box Top 100. It is a prequel to the song entitled "Let It Snow '98" by McKnight and themselves, from McKnight's first Christmas album, Bethlehem, which was released five years later.

== Music video ==
The official music video for "Let It Snow" was directed by Lionel C. Martin.

== Charts ==
=== Weekly charts ===
Chart (1993)	Peak position
Australia (ARIA)	96
US Billboard Hot 100	32
US Hot R&B/Hip-Hop Songs (Billboard)	17
US Rhythmic Airplay (Billboard)	17
US Cash Box Top 100	45

=== Year-end charts ===
Chart (1993)	Position
US Cash Box Top 100	24

== Certifications ==
Region	Certification	Certified units/sales
United States (RIAA)	Gold	500,000^{‡}
^{‡} Sales+streaming figures based on certification alone.
