= Anytime (Brian McKnight album) =

Studio album by Brian McKnight
- Released: September 23, 1997
- Genre: R&B
- Length: 54:14
- Label: Mercury
- Producers: Brian McKnight; Peter Black; Sean Combs; Charles Farrar; The Hitmen; Ron "Amen-Ra" Lawrence; Stevie J.; Anthony Nance; Troy Taylor; Trackmasters; Keith Thomas

Brian McKnight chronology
I Remember You (1995)	Anytime (1997)	Bethlehem (1998)

Singles from Anytime
- 1. "You Should Be Mine (Don't Waste Your Time)" Released: August 19, 1997; 2. "Anytime" Released: November 16, 1997; 3. "The Only One For Me" Released: April 7, 1998; 4. "Hold Me (Remix)" Released: November 10, 1998

Anytime is the third studio album by American singer Brian McKnight. It was released by Mercury Records on September 23, 1997, in the United States. Following I Remember You (1995), McKnight enlisted a broader range of collaborators for the project, including producers Sean Combs, Keith Thomas, Poke & Tone, and songwriters Diane Warren, and Peter Black. Although McKnight wrote most of the album's material, Anytime marked a departure from the urban adult contemporary sound of his earlier work, incorporating greater elements of hip hop soul through its production and collaborations.

Upon its release, the album garnered generally mixed reviews from music critics, with some praising its hip hop-influenced direction while others criticized its uninspired material. Commercially, it broke into the top 20 on the US Billboard 200, while becoming McKnight's first album to top the Top R&B/Hip-Hop Albums chart. A steady seller, it was certified double platinum by the Recording Industry Association of America (RIAA), indicating sales in excess of 2.0 units, and spawned several singles, including the top 20 hit "You Should Be Mine (Don't Waste Your Time)". Anytime marked McKnight's last record with Mercury Records before moving to Motown Records.

== Background ==
Anytime marked McKnight's third studio album with Mercury Records. While his previous album I Remember You (1995) was certified gold by the Recording Industry Association of America (RIAA), it only sold half as much as its predecessor Brian McKnight (1992). Feeling initially pressured after what he called "the pseudo-failure of the I Remember You album,” McKnight, who was used to writing and producing most of his music by himself, decided to work with a wider range of musicians on the Anytime, including Sean "Puffy" Combs, Keith Thomas, Poke & Tone, Diane Warren, and Peter Block. With Anytime exposing to a wider McKnight audience, McKnight elaborated in a 2012 interview: "If Anytime was the spark, then Back at One became the fire. I was doing things then that I had never done before, that an audience had never heard or seen."

== Promotion ==
Anytime spawned four singles, several of which achieved significant success on the US Billboard charts. The lead single "You Should Be Mine (Don't Waste Your Time)" became McKnight's biggest hit in four years, peaking at number 17 on the US Billboard Hot 100 and number 4 on the Hot R&B/Hip-Hop Songs chart. It featured rapper Mase, whose own career was at its peak during 1997. The title track was an even bigger hit, reaching number 6 on the Billboard Hot 100 Airplay chart in May 1998. Since it was not released as a physical single, it was ineligible to chart on the Hot 100, but was still one of the most played songs on the radio during 1998. Anytime's third single "The Only One for Me" hit number 14 on the Rhythmic Top 40, as again no physical single was released for it. The fourth and final single was "Hold Me" hit number 35 on the Hot 100 and number 12 on the Hot R&B/Hip-Hop Songs. The music video for "Hold Me" was released for the week ending on November 8, 1998.

== Critical reception ==
Professional ratings
Review scores
Source	Rating
AllMusic	3/5 stars
Robert Christgau	(choice cut)
The Rolling Stone Album Guide	2.5/5 stars
Vibe	mixed

Anytime garnered generally mixed reviews from music critics. Stephen Thomas Erlewine from Allmusic felt that McKnight "continues with the mellow, romantic urban R&B that has become his trademark, but there's a new twist [...] McKnight hasn't exhausted its possibilities yet – Anytime is as strong as its predecessor – but "You Should Be Mine" and "Hold Me" suggest that he may be better off pursuing a new, hip-hop-influenced direction." In a contemporary review, The Rolling Stone Album Guide wrote that Anytime "signaled the start of a new phase in McKnight's career." In his review for Vibe, Darren McNeill called Anytime a "collection of mostly tired joints [...] McKnight's solo effort pales in comparison to work by emerging-soul craftsmen like Eric Benét and Rahsaan Patterson." In his consumer guide for The Village Voice, critic Robert Christgau gave Anytime a "cut" rating, indicating "an album that isn't worth your time or money – sometimes a Neither, more often a Dud."

== Commercial performance ==
In the United States, Anytime became McKnight's highest-charting album yet, peaking at number 13 on the Billboard 200. McKnight's first album to do so, it also reached the top on Billboard's Top R&B/Hip-Hop Albums chart, spending three weeks at number one. According to Soundscan, Anytime had sold 1.7 million copies by January 1999. It was eventually certified double pltianum by the Recording Industry Association of America (RIAA), indicating sales in excess of 2.0 million copies. Billboard ranked the album fourth on its 1998 Top R&B/Hip-Hop Albums year-end chart.

== Track listing ==
Anytime track listing
No.	Title	Writer(s)	Producer(s)	Length
1.	"Anytime"	Brian McKnight; Brandon Barnes	McKnight	4:33
2.	"Could"	McKnight; Barnes	McKnight	4:26
3.	"You Should Be Mine (Don't Waste Your Time)" (featuring Mase)	Sean Combs; Ron Lawrence; Mason Betha; Kelly Price; Steven Jordan; James Brown; McKnight	Sean "Puffy" Combs; Ron Lawrence; Stevie J	4:49
4.	"Show Me the Way Back to Your Heart"	Diane Warren	Keith Thomas	3:55
5.	"Every Time We Say Goodbye"	McKnight; Anthony Nance	McKnight	4:05
6.	"You Got the Bomb"	McKnight	McKnight	4:41
7.	"Hold Me" (featuring Willie Max)	Mary J. Blige; Samuel J. Barnes; Jean-Claude Olivier; Cory Rooney; Roger Troutman; Larry Troutman; Shirley Murdock; Tupac Shakur; Ronald R. Brooks; Gregory E. Jacobs	Poke & Tone; Cory Rooney	3:49
8.	"The Only One for Me"	McKnight	McKnight	5:12
9.	"Til I Get Over You"	McKnight	McKnight	4:57
10.	"I Belong to You"	Peter Black	Black	4:45
11.	"Jam Knock"	McKnight; John Robert Smith	McKnight; The Characters (co.)	4:33
12.	"When the Chariot Comes"	McKnight; Barnes	McKnight	4:31

Samples

- "Anytime" contains an uncredited sample of "Outside Your Door" performed by Meshell Ndegeocello.
- "You Should Be Mine (Don't Waste Your Time)" contains a sample from "I Got Ants in My Pants", written and performed by James Brown.
- "Hold Me" contains an interpolation of "I Get Around", written by Roger Troutman, Larry Troutman, Shirley Murdock, Tupac Shakur, Ronald R. Brooks, and Gregory E. Jacobs.
- "Jam Knock" contains an interpolation of "I Can't Wait", written by John Robert Smith.

== Personnel ==
Musicians

- Brian McKnight – lead vocals, background vocals (tracks 1, 2, 4–6, 8–12), all instruments (tracks 1, 6, 8, 9), keyboards (tracks 2, 12), additional keyboards (track 5), keyboard programming (track 11), rhythm and vocal arrangement (track 11)
- Murray Adler – violin (tracks 2, 12)
- Rick Baptist – trumpet/cornet (track 12)
- Bob Becker – viola (tracks 2, 12)
- Peter Black – all instruments (track 10)
- Gary Bovyer – bass clarinet (track 12)
- Denyse Buffum – viola (tracks 2, 12)
- Susan Chatman – violin (tracks 2, 12)
- Ron Clark – violin (tracks 2, 12)
- Jon Clarke – English horn (track 12)
- DJ (Step Up) Clue – background vocals (track 7)
- Lisa Cochran – background vocals (track 4)
- Larry Corbett – cello (tracks 2, 12)
- Louise De Tullio – alto flute (track 12)
- David Duke – French horn (tracks 2, 12)
- Bruce Dukov – violin (tracks 2, 12)
- Chris Ermacoff – cello (tracks 2, 12)
- Charles Farrar – drum programming (track 11)
- Kim Fleming – background vocals (track 4)
- Armen Garabedian – violin (tracks 2, 12)
- Berj Garabedian – violin (tracks 2, 12)
- James Getzoff – violin (tracks 2, 12)
- Harris Goldman – violin (tracks 2, 12)
- Endre Granat – violin (tracks 2, 12)
- Mark Hammond – drum programming (track 4)
- Scott Haupert – viola (tracks 2, 12)
- Tom Hemby – classical guitar (track 4)
- Dann Huff – guitars (track 4)
- Rodney Jerkins – additional drum programming (track 5)
- Suzie Katayama – orchestra contractor/coordinator and cello (tracks 2, 12)
- Peter Kent – violin (tracks 2, 12)
- Dan Greco – percussion (track 12)
- Janet Lakatos – viola (tracks 2, 12)
- Joy Lyle – violin (tracks 2, 12)
- Mike Markman – violin (tracks 2, 12)
- Mase – rap vocals (track 3)
- Jerry McPherson – guitars (track 4)
- Joe Meyer – French horn (tracks 2, 12)
- Bill K. Meyers – orchestra arrangement (tracks 2, 12)
- Oscar Meza Jr. – bass (tracks 2, 12)
- Ralph Morrison – violin (tracks 2, 12)
- Anthony Nance – drum programming (tracks 1, 2, 6, 8, 9), all instruments (track 5)
- Maria Newman – viola (tracks 2, 12)
- Bob Peterson – violin (tracks 2, 12)
- Poke & Tone – drum programming (track 7)
- Barbra Porter – violin (tracks 2, 12)
- Kelly Price – background vocals and vocal arrangement (track 3)
- Steve Richards – cello (tracks 2, 12)
- Cory Rooney – keyboards (track 7)
- Jay Rosen – violin (tracks 2, 12)
- Anatoly Rosinsky – violin (tracks 2, 12)
- Gerry Rotella – alto flute (track 12)
- John Scanlon – viola (tracks 2, 12)
- Haim Shtrum – violin (tracks 2, 12)
- Dan Smith – cello (tracks 2, 12)
- Rudy Stein – cello (tracks 2, 12)
- Troy Taylor – background vocals and drum programming (track 11), rhythm and vocal arrangement (track 11)
- Keith Thomas – arrangements, piano, synthesizer, and bass programming (track 4)
- Brad Warnaar – French horn (tracks 2, 12)
- John Wittenberg – violin (tracks 2, 12)
- Don Williams – percussion (track 12)
- Willie Max – background vocals (track 7)
- Ken Yerke – violin (tracks 2, 12)
- David Young – bass (tracks 2, 12)
- Bob Zimmitt – percussion (track 12)

Technical

- Tom Bender – assistant mix engineer (tracks 2, 4, 12)
- Brant Biles – mix engineer (track 10)
- Peter Black – mix engineer (track 10)
- "Bassy" Bob Brockmann – mix engineer (tracks 1, 5, 6, 8, 9)
- Andy Cardenas – recording engineer (track 3)
- Doug Elkins – assistant engineer (tracks 10, 12)
- Dan Evans – production coordinator (track 3)
- Mick Guzauski – mix engineer (tracks 2, 4, 12)
- Doug "The Colonel" Kern – assistant engineer (tracks 6, 9)
- Paul Logus – mix engineer (track 11)
- John "JM" Meredith – second engineer track 3)
- Carl Nappa – recording engineer (track 11)
- Axel Niehaus – recording engineer (track 3)
- Greg Parker – assistant engineer (track 4)
- Joe Perrera – recording engineer (track 3)
- Herb Powers – mastering engineer
- Pierre Smith – second engineer track 3)
- Ed Rasso – assistant mix engineer (tracks 1, 5, 6, 8, 9)
- David Retinas – orchestra engineer (tracks 2, 12)
- Shaun Shankel – production coordinator (track 4)
- Mary Ann Souza – assistant engineer (tracks 1, 2, 5, 8, 11)
- Rich Travali – recording and mixing engineer (track 7)
- Bill Whittington – recording engineer (track 4)
- Chris Wood – recording engineer (tracks 1, 2, 5, 6, 8–12)

== Charts ==
=== Weekly charts ===
Weekly chart performance for Anytime
Chart (1997–1998)	Peak position
US Billboard 200	13
US Top R&B/Hip-Hop Albums (Billboard)	1

=== Year-end charts ===
Year-end chart performance for Anytime
Chart (1998)	Position
US Top R&B/Hip-Hop Albums (Billboard)	4

== Certifications ==
Certifications for Anytime
Region	Certification	Certified units/sales
United States (RIAA)	2× Platinum	2,000,000^{^}
^{^} Shipments figures based on certification alone.
