= Love of My Life (Brian McKnight song) =

Single by Brian McKnight

from the album Superhero
- Released: 2001
- Genre: R&B, soul
- Length: 4:41
- Label: Motown
- Songwriter: Brian McKnight
- Producer: Brian McKnight

Brian McKnight singles chronology
| "Still" (2001) | "Love of My Life" (2001) | "Tell Me What's It Gonna Be" (2002) |

"Love of My Life" is 2001 single by the American R&B singer Brian McKnight from his album Superhero. The song peaked at number 51 on the Billboard Hot 100 and number 11 on the R&B/Hip-Hop chart.

== In popular culture ==
In an episode of Season 3 of The Parkers, "Crazy Love", Professor Stanley Oglevee (played by Dorien Wilson) was lip-syncing the song when he was trying to seduce Nikki Parker (played by Mo'Nique) with the help of Brian McKnight (playing himself in the episode).

== Charts ==
=== Weekly charts ===
| Chart (2001) | Peak position |
|---|---|
| US Billboard Hot 100 | 51 |
| US Hot R&B/Hip-Hop Songs (Billboard) | 11 |

=== Year-end charts ===
| Chart (2001) | Position |
|---|---|
| US Hot R&B/Hip-Hop Songs (Billboard) | 67 |
