= Bethlehem (Brian McKnight album) =

Studio album by Brian McKnight
- Released: October 20, 1998
- Length: 41:27
- Label: Motown
- Producers: Brian McKnight; Bill Meyers; Wanya Morris

Brian McKnight chronology
Anytime (1997)	Bethlehem (1998)	Back at One (1999)

Bethlehem is the fourth studio album by American singer Brian McKnight. It was released on October 20, 1998 through Motown Records. McKnight's first Christmas album, Bethlehem consists of eleven tracks, featuring original songs and cover versions of Christmas standards and carols, several of which are duets featuring recording artists such as Boyz II Men, Dave Koz, Michael Sembello, Tim Miner, and Maria Cole as well McKnight's brother Claude, his then-wife Julie and his sons.

== Critical reception ==
Professional ratings
Review scores
Source	Rating
AllMusic	2.5/5 stars
Entertainment Weekly	B−
The Rolling Stone Album Guide	3/5 stars

Gina Boldman from AllMusic called Bethlehem a "joyful, romantic holiday album [...] Overall, Bethlehem is a diverse collection of traditional and modern-day Christmas songs with something for everyone celebrating the season." Entertainment Weekly's Chris Willman found there was "no need to worry about McKnight’s ability to handle the standard demands of Bethlehem, an effective showcase for the balladeer's Mary-don't-you-weep-let-me approach to tremulous soul." He called the original "okay."

== Track listing ==
Bethlehem track listing
No.	Title	Producer(s)	Length
1.	"Hail Mary" (featuring The McKnight Family Choir)	Brian McKnight	2:10
2.	"Bethlehem Tonight" (featuring Michael Sembello)	McKnight	3:32
3.	"Let It Snow '98" (featuring Boyz II Men)	McKnight; Wanya Morris	4:24
4.	"Silent Night (Interlude)" (Mrs. Nat King Cole)	McKnight; Bruce Carbone	1:15
5.	"Have Yourself a Merry Little Christmas"	McKnight; Bill Meyers	3:59
6.	"It's All About Love" (featuring Brian McKnight Jr. and Niko)	McKnight	5:15
7.	"Christmas Time Is Here"	McKnight	3:27
8.	"The First Noel" (featuring Claude McKnight and Tim Miner)	McKnight	3:36
9.	"Home for the Holidays"	McKnight	3:18
10.	"Don't Let Me Go"	McKnight	4:14
11.	"Christmas Eve with You" (featuring Dave Koz and Julie McKnight)	McKnight	6:20
Total length:			41:27

== Personnel ==
Credits adapted from the liner notes of Bethlehem.

- Bob Becker – viola (track 2)
- Boyz II Men – vocals (track 3)
- Jackie Brand – violin (track 2)
- Denyne Buffum – viola (track 2)
- Bruce Carbone – executive producer, producer (track 4)
- Susan Chatman – violin (track 2)
- Ron Clark – violin (track 2)
- Maria Cole – vocals (track 4)
- Larry Corbett – cello (track 2)
- Derrick Cummings – guitar (track 8)
- Mario DeLeon – violin (track 2)
- Joel Derouin – violin (track 2)
- Bruce Dukov – first violin (track 2)
- Prescott Ellison – drums (tracks 8, 10)
- Charlie Everett – violin (track 2)
- Stefanie Fife – cello (track 2)
- Matt Funes – viola (track 2)
- Berj Garabedian – violin (track 2)
- Robert Gerry – violin (track 2)
- Chris Hanulik – upright bass (track 2)
- Peter Hatch – viola (track 2)
- Daniel Higgins – alto flute (track 2), clarinet (track 5)
- Suzie Katayama – cello (track 2)
- Dan Kelley – French horn (track 5)
- Peter Kent – violin (track 2)
- Valerie King – alto flute (track 2)
- Dave Koz – saxophone (track 11)
- Brian Leonard – violin (track 2)
- Robert Lewis – organ (track 8)
- Dane Little – cello (track 2)
- Mike Markman – violin (track 2)
- Brian McKnight – lead vocals and producer (all tracks), backing vocals (tracks 5, 7–10), instruments (tracks 3, 6, 8, 11)
- Brian McKnight Jr. – vocals (track 6)
- Claude McKnight – vocals (tracks 1, 8)
- Julie McKnight – vocals (track 10)
- Niko McKnight – vocals (track 6)
- The McKnight Family Choir – vocals (track 1)
- Bill Meyers – co-producer (track 5)
- Tim Miner – vocals (track 8)
- Vicky Miskolosky – viola (track 2)
- Wanya Morris – producer (track 3)
- The McKnight Family Choir – vocals
- Maria Newman – viola (track 2)
- Tollak Ollestad – harmonica (track 5)
- Dave "Hard Drive" Pensado – mixing
- Bob Peterson – violin (track 2)
- Michele Richards – violin (track 2)
- Steve Richards – cello (track 2)
- Gerry Rotella – alto flute (track 2), flute (track 5)
- Eddy Schreyer – mastering
- Michael Sembello – vocals and keyboards (track 2)
- Haim Shtrum – violin (track 2)
- Dan Smith – cello (track 2)
- Tina Soule – cello (track 2)
- Eddie Stein – violin (track 2)
- Rudy Stein – cello (track 2)
- David Stenske – violin (track 2)
- Rick Todd – French horn (track 5)
- Herb Trawick – executive producer
- John Wittenberg – violin (track 2)
- Phil Yao – French horn (track 5)

== Charts ==
Chart (1998)	Peak position
US Billboard 200	95
US Top R&B/Hip-Hop Albums (Billboard)	33
