= More Than Words (Brian McKnight album) =

Studio album by Brian McKnight
- Released: March 19, 2013
- Genre: R&B
- Length: 58:02
- Label: E1 Music
- Producer: Brian McKnight

Brian McKnight chronology
Just Me (2011)	More Than Words (2013)	Better (2016)

More Than Words is the thirteenth studio album by American singer Brian McKnight. It was released by E1 Music on March 19, 2013 in the United States. Entirely produced by McKnight himself, the album features contribution from singer Colbie Caillat as well as his two sons Niko and Brian McKnight Jr. More Than Words features the singles "Sweeter" and "4th of July."

Critics generally viewed More Than Words positively, with reviewers praising its nostalgic blend of late-1970s/early-1980s influences and strong songwriting, though some noted it was overly "safe," uneven, or lacking standout upbeat moments. Commercially, the album peaked at number 64 on the US Billboard 200 and number ten on the Top R&B/Hip-Hop Albums, marking a modest performance and his lowest-charting release (excluding holiday albums), with 26,000 copies sold in the United States by August 2016.

== Critical reception ==
Professional ratings
Review scores
Source	Rating
About.com	3/5 stars
AllMusic	3.5/5 stars
Independent Online	4/5 stars
Los Angeles Times	3.5/5 stars

In his review for AllMusic, editor Andy Kellman noted that More Than Words "is filled with references to late-'70s and early-'80s R&B and soft rock", and called it "McKnight's most enjoyable album since 2006's Ten." Mikael Wood from Los Angeles Times wrote that the album "is great. Really great. So great that unless D’Angelo gets around to completing his long-awaited return to music, it might end up the best R&B; album of the year [...] McKnight on the overlooked More Than Words simply feels like a lover of the game, a champion minus his title." Independent Online's Munya Vomo called a "classic R&B album" that "takes you back to the mid-1990s," blending mature grooves, romantic ballads, and family legacy, and while "not another Back at One or Anytime type of CD," it was "just as decent."

Boston Globe critic Ken Capobianco wrote that McKnight has "mastered the tasteful, artfully arranged R&B song" on More Than Words, delivering a "spirited, confident" album that "doesn’t challenge" but "does satisfy," even if it "rarely thrills." Brendon Veevers from Renowned for Sound called the album a "nice release." He felt that "the up-tempo hits are too few and far between [...] Nonetheless the exemption of a few dance floor hits and the disappointment of the missing vocal duet doesn’t take away the fact that More Than Words is a remarkable record overflowing with the smooth groves and charming songwriting brilliance of an R&B master." SoulTracks editor Melody Charles found that "More Than Words Musiq-esque titles, overlywhelmingly 'safe' selections and growing preoccupation with the freaky-deaky seem to signal that McKnight needs to take than a couple of years away in order to preserve his lofty status."

== Commercial performance ==
More Than Words opened and peaked at number 64 on the US Billboard 200, with first-week sales of 7,000 copies, representing McKnight's lowest-charting album at the time apart from his holiday releases. It also reached number ten on the Top R&B/Hip-Hop Albums chart, becoming his tenth album to enter the top ten of that chart. By August 2016, More Than Words had sold 26,000 copies in the United States.

== Track listing ==
All tracks are produced by Brian McKnight.

More Than Words track listing
No.	Title	Writer(s)	Length
1.	"Don't Stop"	McKnight	3:52
2.	"Letsomebodyluvu"	McKnight	3:58
3.	"4th of July"	McKnight	4:07
4.	"Sweeter"	McKnight	3:48
5.	"She Doesn't Know"	McKnight	3:53
6.	"More Than Words"	McKnight; Colbie Caillat	4:47
7.	"Nothing But a Thang"	McKnight	3:21
8.	"Livewithoutyou"	McKnight	3:23
9.	"Made for Love"	McKnight	3:31
10.	"Get U 2 Stay"	McKnight	4:37
11.	"Slow"	McKnight; Brian McKnight, Jr.	4:02
12.	"Another"	McKnight	3:02
13.	"Trying Not to Fall Asleep"	McKnight	4:16
14.	"Ididntreallymeantoturnuout" (featuring Brian McKnight, Jr.)	McKnight; Brian McKnight, Jr.	3:09
15.	"The Front, the Back, the Side" (featuring Niko McKnight)	McKnight; Niko McKnight	4:26
Total length:			58:02

== Charts ==
Chart performance for More Than Words
Chart (2013)	Peak position
US Billboard 200	64
US Independent Albums (Billboard)	13
US Top R&B/Hip-Hop Albums (Billboard)	10
