= Willie Max =

Willie Max was a R&B trio composed of sisters Rose, Sky and Lyric Smith. The girl group was based in Detroit, Michigan and began its career under the name Smith Reflections.

The group began to establish themselves by working as an opening act for groups like Tony! Toni! Tone! Their work paid off as Raphael Saadiq took the girls under his wing and reshaped their image. Saadiq renamed the group Willie Max, after their father and mother's first names.

In 1998, signed to Saddiq's Pookie Records label, the girls released their debut album, Bona Fide. The album was made predominantly by the girls and Lathun Grady, and scored one reasonable hit with "Can't Get Enough" in 1998, which reached #49 on the Hot 100 and #20 on the R&B charts.
