= Back at One (album) =

Studio album by Brian McKnight
- Released: September 21, 1999
- Studio: Backroom Studios (Glendale, California), Darkchild Studios (Pleasantville, New Jersey); EMI Studios (Santa Monica, California); Capitol Studios (Hollywood)
- Genre: R&B
- Length: 51:36
- Label: Motown
- Producer: Brian McKnight; Fred Jerkins III; Rodney Jerkins; Anthony Nance

Brian McKnight chronology
Bethlehem (1998)	Back at One (1999)	Superhero (2001)

Singles from Back at One
- 1. "Back at One" Released: August 17, 1999; 2. "Stay or Let It Go" Released: January 11, 2000; 3. "6, 8, 12" Released: May 2, 2000

Back at One is the fifth studio album by American singer Brian McKnight, released on September 21, 1999, by Motown Records. The album followed the same pattern as McKnight's previous album of original material, Anytime (1997), in which he began his transition from urban adult contemporary into the contemporary R&B/hip hop soul market. Back at One contains a mix of hip hop-influenced contemporary R&B songs, as well as a variety of ballads. While McKnight co-wrote and produced nearly every song on the album, he also worked with a few new producers, including Rodney Jerkins, his brother Fred Jerkins III, and Anthony Nance.

Upon its release, the album received generally mixed reviews from music critics. A commercial success, Back at One sold 144,000 units in its first week of release, reaching number seven on the US Billboard 200. It remains McKnight's most successful album, it sold over 3.0 million copies worldwide and received triple platinum certification by the Recording Industry Association of America (RIAA) and platinum by Music Canada. The album produced three singles: its title track, which peaked at number two on the Billboard Hot 100, as well as "Stay or Let It Go" and "6, 8, 12". The album was nominated for Best R&B Album at the 2000 Grammy Awards, and the Soul Train Music Award for Best R&B/Soul Album.

== Background ==
In 1997, Brian McKnight released his third studio album Anytime. Following the moderate success of his previous album I Remember You (1995), the singer, who was used to writing, playing and producing most of his music by himself, decided to work with a wider range of musicians on the album, including Sean "Puffy" Combs, Keith Thomas, and Poke & Tone. However, while Anytime exposed McKnight to a wider audience, taking his work further into the hip hop soul genre, McKnight disliked their approach to incorporate sampling on their songs. After the commercial triumph of Anytime, McKnight signed with Motown Records to release his first Christmas album Bethlehem (1998) and began work on his fourth album. While he enjoyed working on the record, McKnight was tormented by personal problems during the production process since he had fallen in love with someone else outside of his marriage with his wife Julie. In a 2012 interview, McKnight elaborated : "If Anytime was the spark, then Back at One became the fire. I was doing things then that I had never done before, that an audience had never heard or seen [...] I don't even listen to that record because it was the highest and lowest point of my life, because of this person."

== Promotion ==
"Back at One", the album's title track, was issued by Motown Records as the album's lead single. It reached number two on the US Billboard Hot 100 and hit number seven on the Hot R&B/Hip-Hop Songs, becoming McKnight's highest-charting single to date. In addition, it became a top ten hit in Canada and New Zealand, and entered the top thiry in Australia and the Netherlands. Jerkins-produced "Stay or Let It Go" was released on a double single with the song "Win", McKnight's contribution to the soundtrack of the 2000 American drama film Men of Honor. It reached the lower half of the Billboard Hot 100 and peaked at number 26 on the Hot R&B/Hip-Hop Songs, with "Win" reaching number 51. Third and final single "6, 8, 12" entered the top fifty on the Hot R&B/Hip-Hop Songs.

== Critical reception ==
Professional ratings
Review scores
Source	Rating
AllMusic	3/5 stars
Entertainment Weekly	C+
Los Angeles Times	1/4 stars
MTV Asia	8/10
The Rolling Stone Album Guide	2.5/5 stars

Stephen Thomas Erlewine from AllMusic felt that with Back at One "McKnight has figured out a way to make his gospel-flavored contemporary urban soul sound fresh, mainly by keeping the focus on the songs. There's nothing extraneous on Back at One: All 13 songs are given clean presentations, and he blesses them with impassioned performances. At times, the material itself is not particularly interesting, but most albums have filler; what counts is the good stuff, and there's enough of it on Back at One to make it another solid effort from McKnight." In a contemporary review, The Rolling Stone Album Guide wrote that "excepting the occasional boilerplate slow jam, One is McKnight's finest effort."

Writing for Billboard, Michael Paoletta found that "like its predecessor, 1997's Anytime, Back at One finds the singer keeping it sublime yet simple on an acoustic-based set. This, of course, allows McKnight ample room to showcase his smooth, simmering vocals." In her review for the Los Angeles Times, Connie Johnson wrote that "McKnight records the ultimate background music, ideally suited for a candlelight dinner for two, not to mention more intimate interludes – music that's not distracting, in other words. McKnight is certainly not unpredictable [...] Everything is as classy and correct as one would expect from a McKnight project. Basically, it's pretty but not essential." Entertainment Weekly's Barry Walters found that "as a crooner who writes, performs, and produces his own material, McKnight has an edge over his multiplatinum R&B peers. But because he primarily mimics other hit-makers, that distinction is negligible [...] As the title track love list inadvertently suggests, this is soul by numbers."

== Chart performance ==
In the United States, Back at One debuted and peaked at number seven on the Billboard 200, selling 144,000 copies in its first week. This marked McKnight's highest first weeks sales as well as highest-charting debut then, according to SoundScan. In addition, it reached the top five on Billboard's Top R&B/Hip-Hop Albums chart, becoming McKnight's third album to do so. With sales in excess of more than 3.0 million copies, the album went on to become McKnight's biggest seller within his discography. It was eventually certified triple platinum by the Recording Industry Association of America (RIAA). Billboard ranked the album 56th and 37th on its Top R&B/Hip-Hop Albums year-end rankings in 1999 and 2000, respectively. Also McKnight's first album to chart internationally, Back at One entered the top twenty in Canada, where it certified platinum by Music Canada.

== Track listing ==
Back at One track listing
No.	Title	Writer(s)	Producer(s)	Length
1.	"Last Dance"	McKnight; Brandon Barnes	McKnight	4:45
2.	"Stay"	McKnight	McKnight	4:23
3.	"Played Yourself"	McKnight; Rodney Jerkins; Harvey Mason, Jr.; LaShawn Daniels; Fred Jerkins III	R. Jerkins; F. Jerkins	4:16
4.	"Back at One"	McKnight	McKnight	4:23
5.	"Stay or Let It Go"	McKnight; R. Jerkins; Mason; Daniels; F. Jerkins	R. Jerkins; F. Jerkins	4:40
6.	"6, 8, 12"	McKnight; Barnes	McKnight	4:07
7.	"You Could Be the One"	McKnight; Anthony Nance	McKnight; Nance^{[a]}	5:39
8.	"Shall We Begin"	McKnight	McKnight	3:59
9.	"Gothic Interlude"	McKnight	McKnight	1:00
10.	"Can You Read My Mind"	McKnight; Barnes	McKnight	3:57
11.	"Lonely"	McKnight	McKnight	4:26
12.	"Cherish"	McKnight	McKnight	4:05
13.	"Home"	McKnight	McKnight	4:22
Total length:				51:36

Notes

- ^{^[a]} signifies a co-producer.

== Personnel ==
Credits adapted from the liner notes of Back at One.

- Tom Bender – mixing assistant (tracks 4, 6)
- Jerry Christie – assistant engineer (track 10)
- Derek "Hot Sauce" Cumming – guitars (track 11)
- LaShawn Daniels – vocal production (tracks 3, 5)
- Dylan "3D" Dresdow – mixing assistant (tracks 1, 2, 7–13)
- Jean-Marie Horvat – engineer and mixing (tracks 3, 5)
- Dave Fredric – assistant engineer (track 2)
- Mick Guzauski – mixing (tracks 4, 6)
- Anthony Jeffries – engineer (track 7)
- Fred Jerkins III – music and production (tracks 3, 5)
- Rodney Jerkins – music and production (tracks 3, 5)
- Greg Leisz – pedal steel (track 6)
- Harvey Mason, Jr. – additional music, programming, Pro Tools, and engineer (tracks 3, 5)
- Brian McKnight – vocals (all tracks), production and arrangements (1, 2, 4, 6–13), keyboards (1, 2, 4, 6, 8, 10–13), drum programming (4, 6, 11, 13), bass (4, 6, 10, 11, 13), percussion (4)
- "McNoche" – guitars (tracks 2, 6, 8, 10, 12)
- Bill K. Meyers – orchestral arrangements (tracks 4, 13)
- Anthony Nance – co-producer (track 7), drum programming (1, 2, 7, 8, 10, 12), synth bass (1), keyboards (7)
- Dave "Hard Drive" Pensado – mixing (tracks 1, 2, 7–13)
- Herb Powers – mastering
- Wayne S. Rodrigues – Scratches (track 10)
- Mary Ann Souza – assistant engineer (tracks 1, 2, 4, 6–9, 11–13)
- Tommy Vicari – orchestral engineer (tracks 4, 13)
- Chris Wood – engineer (tracks 1, 2, 4, 6–13)

== Charts ==
=== Weekly charts ===
Weekly chart performance for Back at One
Chart (1999–2000)	Peak position
Australian Albums (ARIA)	56
Canadian Albums (Billboard)	19
Canadian R&B Albums (Nielsen SoundScan)	1
German Albums (Offizielle Top 100)	41
Dutch Albums (Album Top 100)	55
US Billboard 200	7
US Top R&B/Hip-Hop Albums (Billboard)	2

=== Year-end charts ===
1999 year-end chart performance for Back at One
Chart (1999)	Position
US Billboard 200	121
US Top R&B/Hip-Hop Albums (Billboard)	56

2000 year-end chart performance for Back at One
Chart (2000)	Position
Canadian Albums (Nielsen SoundScan)	197
US Billboard 200	48
US Top R&B/Hip-Hop Albums (Billboard)	37

== Certifications ==
Certifications for Back at One
Region	Certification	Certified units/sales
Canada (Music Canada)	Platinum	100,000^{^}
United States (RIAA)	3× Platinum	3,000,000^{^}
^{^} Shipments figures based on certification alone.
