= You Should Be Mine (Don't Waste Your Time) =

Single by Brian McKnight featuring Mase

from the album Anytime
- Released: August 19, 1997
- Recorded: 1996
- Genre: R&B; quiet storm; hip-hop
- Length: 4:47
- Label: Mercury
- Songwriters: Sean Combs; Ron "Amen-Ra" Lawrence; Brian McKnight; Mason Betha; Kelly Price; Steven Jordan; James Brown
- Producers: Sean "Puffy" Combs; Ron "Amen-Ra" Lawrence; Stevie J

Brian McKnight singles chronology
| "Still in Love" (1995) | "You Should Be Mine (Don't Waste Your Time)" (1997) | "Anytime" (1998) |

Mase singles chronology
| "Mo Money Mo Problems" (1997) | "You Should Be Mine (Don't Waste Your Time)" (1997) | "Feel So Good" (1997) |

"You Should Be Mine (Don't Waste Your Time)" is a song by American singer Brian McKnight, released by Mercury Records on August 19, 1997 as the first single from his third studio album, Anytime (1997). The song features guest vocals from American rapper Mase, while backing vocals are performed by Kelly Price in an uncredited appearance. It was co-written by all three, while production—based on a sample of James Brown's 1972 song "I Got Ants in My Pants"—was handled by Mase's colleagues at Bad Boy Records, including the label's founder Puff Daddy, as well as its in-house producers Stevie J and Ron "Amen-Ra" Lawrence.

"You Should Be Mine (Don't Waste Your Time)" peaked at number 17 on the Billboard Hot 100 and number four on the Hot R&B/Hip Hop Songs chart. It landed at numbers 86 and 35 for the charts' respective year-end lists. It sold at least 600,000 copies by the end of the year.

== Charts ==
=== Weekly charts ===
| Chart (1997) | Peak position |
|---|---|
| US Billboard Hot 100 | 17 |
| US Hot R&B/Hip-Hop Songs (Billboard) | 4 |
| US Rhythmic Airplay (Billboard) | 32 |

=== Year-end charts ===
| Chart (1997) | Position |
|---|---|
| US Billboard Hot 100 | 86 |
| US Hot R&B/Hip-Hop Songs (Billboard) | 35 |
