= Love Is (Vanessa Williams and Brian McKnight song) =

1993 single by Vanessa Williams and Brian McKnight

Single by Vanessa Williams and Brian McKnight

from the album Beverly Hills 90210
- Released: March 16, 1993
- Length: 4:45 (album version); 4:01 (radio edit)
- Label: Giant; Reprise
- Songwriters: Tonio K; Michael Caruso; John Keller
- Producer: Gerry Brown

Vanessa Williams singles chronology
"Work to Do" (1992)	"Love Is" (1993)	"The Sweetest Days" (1994)

Brian McKnight singles chronology
"I Can't Go for That" (1992)	"Love Is" (1993)	"One Last Cry" (1993)

Audio video
- "Love Is" on YouTube

"Love Is" is a duet written by Tonio K, Michael Caruso, and John Keller, originally recorded and released by American recording artists Vanessa Williams and Brian McKnight. The single originally appeared on the soundtrack to the television drama series Beverly Hills, 90210; and was also used in the spin-off series Melrose Place. After this exposure, the song peaked at number three on the US Billboard Hot 100, becoming McKnight's breakthrough hit and another hit for Williams. The song topped the Billboard Adult Contemporary chart, where it spent three weeks at the summit and ended 1993 as the most successful adult contemporary song.

There were two different versions released to radio: the more common mix includes energetic electric guitar performing the solo in the bridge; an alternate, lesser-known mix presents melodic solo piano, performed by Philippe Saisse at the bridge. The edit version was that of the guitar mix, which presented a fade out during the second of the two ending chorus refrains. This mix appears on McKnight's greatest hits album, From There to Here: 1989-2002 without the fade, although the piano solo ending is slightly trimmed. The "piano mix" was used in the official video for "Love is" and also appears on Williams's Greatest Hits: The First Ten Years album.

== Critical reception ==
A reviewer from Music & Media commented "What is love? Find out through this dramatic ballad on the right side of kitsch." Head of music Karsten Bendix at Radio Roskilde/Denmark enthused, "I love those harmonies. There are so many ballads around, but these two people can really sing." Alan Jones from Music Week wrote, "This intense, brooding duet is no award winner, issuing every cliche in the book and then some. But it has a certain insidious quality, and the fact that it is featured on Beverly Hills 90210 may be enough to tip the scales in its favour." At the Grammy Awards in 1994, the song received a Grammy Award nomination for Best Pop Performance by a Duo or Group with Vocals.

== Charts ==
=== Weekly charts ===
Chart (1993)	Peak position
Australia (ARIA)	49
Canada Retail Singles (The Record)	6
Canada Top Singles (RPM)	3
Canada Adult Contemporary (RPM)	2
Iceland (Íslenski Listinn Topp 40)	9
US Billboard Hot 100	3
US Adult Contemporary (Billboard)	1
US Hot R&B/Hip-Hop Songs (Billboard)	55
US Pop Airplay (Billboard)	2
US Rhythmic Airplay (Billboard)	16
US Cash Box Top 100	2

=== Year-end charts ===
Chart (1993)	Position
Canada Top Singles (RPM)	30
Canada Adult Contemporary (RPM)	35
US Billboard Hot 100	21
US Adult Contemporary (Billboard)	1
US Cash Box Top 100	20

== Release history ==
Region	Date	Format(s)	Label(s)	Ref.
United States	March 16, 1993	—N/a	Giant; Reprise	
United Kingdom	April 19, 1993	7-inch vinyl; CD; cassette	Mercury	
Australia	June 21, 1993	CD; cassette	Giant	

== Cover versions ==
In 1994, jazz fusion saxophonist Nelson Rangell covered the song for his album Yes, Then Yes.
