= Superhero (Brian McKnight album) =

Studio album by Brian McKnight
- Released: August 28, 2001
- Genres: R&B; hip hop
- Length: 60:40
- Label: Motown
- Producers: Battlecat; Brian McKnight; Bill Meyers; Anthony Nance; Steve Thompson; Lavel "City Spud" Webb

Brian McKnight chronology
Back at One (1999)	Superhero (2001)	U-Turn (2003)

Singles from Superhero
- 1. "Love of My Life" Released: 2001; 2. "Still" Released: 2002; 3. "What's It Gonna Be" Released: 2002

Superhero is the sixth album by American singer Brian McKnight. It was first released by Motown Records on August 28, 2001 in the United States. McKnight recorded this album to showcase his many musical influences and give listeners a glimpse into the past year of his life. Superhero mixes McKnight's usual contemporary R&B style with a touch of rock and roll and rap music. McKnight worked with a variety of producers on the album, including Battlecat, Bill Meyers, Anthony Nance, Steve Thompson, and Lavel "City Spud" Webb. Featured guest vocalists were Justin Timberlake, Nate Dogg, Fred Hammond, and hip hop group St. Lunatics.

The album received favorable reviews from music critics, who called it McKnight's most adventurous and ambitious album yet, and debuted at number seven on the US Billboard 200, moving 153,000 units in its first week. While this marked McKnight's biggest first week sales, it failed to duplicate the multi-platinum success of previous album Back at One (1999), reaching gold status. In 2002, McKnight released several new songs on a reissue of the album, titled Superhero & More. At the 44th Annual Grammy Awards, three songs from the album, including singles "Love of My Life" and "Still," earned four nominations.

== Background ==
Superhero was produced after the release of McKnight's biggest-selling album Back at One which sold more than 3.0 million copies worldwide and was certified triple platinum by the Recording Industry Association of America (RIAA) and platinum by Music Canada. The album produced three singles, including its title track, which reached number two in the US, becoming his highest-charting single yet, and garnered nominations for the Grammy Award for Best R&B Album and the Soul Train Music Award for Best R&B/Soul Album. McKnight reteamed with Anthony Nance and consulted new collaborators such as Battlecat, Bill Meyers, Steve Thompson, and Lavel "City Spud" Webb to work with him on his sixth studio album.

In a promotional interview with Billboard, McKnight commented on Superhero: "It's everything I'm about, personality-wise and music-wise. There's a lot of jazz influence, a little rock, an obvious R&B thing and inspirational music. My other albums were basically undergrad. This record is my graduation." In the album booklet, he further elaborated: "Superheroes are people who do things everyday that go unrecognized... teachers, firemen, police, parents. That sort of grace is what I aspire to and what people should aspire to. These songs talk about those moments and frankly, the sort of man I hope to be. You can view this album as a diary of the past year of my life and these songs as a beacon for me to try to reach higher."

== Critical reception ==
Professional ratings
Review scores
Source	Rating
AllMusic	3/5 stars
Blender	2/5 stars
Entertainment Weekly	B
The Rolling Stone Album Guide	3/5 stars
USA Today	3/4 stars
Vibe	3.5/5 marks

Superhero garnered generally mixed to positive reviews from music critics. Allmusic editor Liana Jonas remarked that "the recording essentially offers up the same romantic and sensitive mid-tempo R&B love songs McKnight has become famous for. However, there are some choice departures by McKnight, reflecting his adventurous side [...] While the album is not groundbreaking, it does show consistency and growth by the talented McKnight. Is it super? No. Worthy? Yes." Cheo Tyehimba of Entertainment Weekly gave the album a B grade and went on to say: "Combining that superpower with his formulaic, but potent songwriting skills, he's created an ambitious CD of mid-tempo hip hop, rock, and gospel grooves [...] Fans won’t be disappointed."

In addition, Lana K. Wilson-Combs from Sacramento News & Review gave the album praise. She explained: "Brian McKnight, one of the most consistent pop balladeers, shows on this new release that he hasn’t lost his street cred [...] McKnight – who’s cut from the same old-school cloth as Teddy Pendergrass, Marvin Gaye and Luther Vandross – specializes in sensuous love songs. Here he doesn’t disappoint." Michael Paoletta Billboard found that the album "does have its flaws [...] but swaying midtempos [...] make up for such missteps. In the end, Superhero is a much welcome addition to McKnight's solid ouevre." Dmitri Ehrlich, writing for Vibe, called Superhero his "most adventurous album". He further elaborated: "Of course, some songs are still as cheesy Velveeta [...] but McKnight is generally intent on proving with this album that he can move beyond his usually light but eminently listenable terrain. Now he's starting to get interesting." In a negative review for Blender, Elysa Gardener called the album a "collection of noble but lackluster tunes that finds the gifted pop-soul crooner evoking Clark Kent more than any caped crusader."

== Accolades ==
McKnight was nominated in the Outstanding Male Artist category at the 2002 NAACP Image Awards for his work on Superhero. In addition, he was nominated for four Grammy Awards for his work on the album, with "Love of My Life" and "Still" receiving a nods in the Best Male R&B Vocal Performance category, "My Kind of Girl" earning a Best Pop Collaboration with Vocals nomination, and "Love of My Life" also garnering a Best R&B Song nod.

== Commercial performance ==
Superhero debuted and peaked at number seven on the US Billboard 200, selling 151,000 copies in its first week. This marked McKnight's highest opening sales up to then. On Billboard's component charts, it reached number four on the Top R&B/Hip-Hop Albums chart. According to Nielsen SoundScan, Superhero sold 870,000 copies in the United States and was eventually certified gold by the Recording Industry Association of America (RIAA) for the shipment of over 500,000 copies in the United States. Elsewhere, Superhero failed to chart. Billboard ranked it 66th on the Top R&B/Hip-Hop Albums year-end chart.

"Love of My Life" was released as the album's lead single. It peaked at number 51 on the Billboard Hot 100 and reached number 11 in the Hot R&B/Hip-Hop Songs chart. "Still" was issued as the album's second single. While it did not have a physical single released and thus was ineligible to chart on the Billboard Hot 100, it peaked at number 22 on the Adult Contemporary chart. "Tell Me What's It Gonna Be" was released as the third and final single. It reached the lower half of the Billboard Hot 100 and peaked at number 48 on Hot R&B/Hip-Hop Songs chart.

== Track listing ==
Superhero track listing
No.	Title	Length
1.	"Prelude"	2:51
2.	"When You Wanna Come"	4:39
3.	"What's It Gonna Be"	4:28
4.	"My Kind of Girl" (featuring Justin Timberlake)	3:52
5.	"Love of My Life"	4:42
6.	"Whatever You Want"	4:06
7.	"Everything"	3:31
8.	"Get Over You"	3:38
9.	"Superhero"	3:08
10.	"Still"	4:19
11.	"Don't Know Where to Start" (featuring Nate Dogg)	4:37
12.	"Biggest Part of Me"	4:37
13.	"When Will I See You Again" (featuring Fred Hammond)	5:18
14.	"For You"	1:56
15.	"Groovin' Tonight" (featuring St. Lunatics)	5:16

Disc 2: Superhero & More... — Reissue
No.	Title	Length
1.	"Thank You (For Saving My Life)" (featuring Cho Kyu-Chan)	3:08
2.	"Over and Over Again"	4:26
3.	"When You Wanna Come" (featuring Urban Xchange)	5:10
4.	"Still" (Music video)	4:19
5.	"Love of My Life" (Music video)	4:41
6.	"Thank You (For Saving My Life)" (Music video)	3:08

== Personnel ==
Credits adapted from the liner notes of Superhero.

- Doug Aldrich – guitar
- Brandon Barnes – composer
- Battlecat – producer
- Tom Bender – mixing engineer
- Bo Boddie – mixing assistant
- Sandy Brummels – art direction
- Bruce Carbone – executive producer
- Steve Churchyard – engineer
- Pamela Dillard – vocals
- Anthony Dixon – composer, keyboards, synthesizer bass
- Peter Doell – engineer
- Nate Dogg – vocals, vocals (background)
- Steve Eigner – guitar
- Jason "Jay E" Epperson – producer
- Mark Eshelman – stage manager
- Errin Familia – assistant engineer
- Joaquin Perez Fernandez – assistant engineer
- Vanessa Fernandez – vocals (background)
- Tony Flores – mixing assistant
- Kevin "D.J. Battlecat" Gilliam – composer
- John Goodmanson – mixing
- David Guerrero – assistant engineer, mixing assistant
- Mick Guzauski – mixing
- Nathaniel Hale – composer
- Fred Hammond – vocals
- Jimmy Hoyson – assistant engineer
- Justin Timberlake – vocals
- St. Lunatics – vocals
- Trisno Ishak – vocals (background)
- Brion James – guitar
- Cho-Kyu-Chan – vocals
- Bashiri Johnson – percussion
- Suzie Katayama – orchestra contractor, string contractor
- Lilly Lee – logo design
- Jason Lloyd – stage manager
- Liz Loblack – product manager
- Jeremy Mackenzie – assistant manager
- Tony Marserati – mixing
- Kedar Massenburg – executive producer
- Brian McKnight – bass, composer, guitar, keyboards, multi instruments, producer, vocals, vocals (background)
- Bill Meyers – composer, conductor, horn arrangements, horn conductor, orchestral arrangements, piano, producer, string arrangements, string conductor
- Peter Mokran – mixing
- Anthony Nance – composer, drum programming, programming
- Tim Nitz – engineer
- Dave Pensado – mixing
- Herb Powers – mastering
- Jimmy Randolph – Pro-Tools
- Robert Read – assistant engineer
- Herb Ritts – photography
- Greg Ross – art direction, design
- Ivy Skoff – orchestra production
- Andrew Slade – assistant engineer
- Mary Ann Souza – assistant engineer
- Steve Thompson – mixing, producer
- Herb Trawick – executive producer
- Urban Xchange – vocals
- Tommy Vicari – engineer, mixing
- Paul Wagner – assistant engineer
- Patrick Weber – technical engineer
- Chris Wood – engineer

== Charts ==
=== Weekly charts ===
Weekly chart performance for Superhero
Chart (2001)	Peak position
US Billboard 200	7
US Top R&B/Hip-Hop Albums (Billboard)	4

=== Year-end charts ===
Year-end chart performance for Superhero
Chart (2001)	Position
Canadian R&B Albums (Nielsen SoundScan)	94
US Billboard 200	149
US Top R&B/Hip-Hop Albums (Billboard)	66

== Certifications ==
Certifications for Superhero
Region	Certification	Certified units/sales
United States (RIAA)	Gold	500,000^{^}
^{^} Shipments figures based on certification alone.
