= U-Turn (Brian McKnight album) =

U Turn

Studio album by Brian McKnight
- Released: March 25, 2003
- Genre: R&B
- Length: 57:16
- Label: Motown
- Producers: Bruce Carbone (exec.); Kedar Massenburg (exec.); Joint Custody; Brian McKnight; Rockwilder; The Underdogs

Brian McKnight chronology
Superhero (2001)	U Turn (2003)	Gemini (2005)

Singles from U Turn
- 1. "Shoulda, Woulda, Coulda" Released: 2003; 2. "All Night Long" Released: 2003; 3. "So Sorry" Released: 2003

U-Turn is the seventh studio album by American singer Brian McKnight. It was released on March 25, 2003 in the United States by Motown Records. The album takes much inspiration in McKnight's split from his wife Julie from whom he divorced the same year. While McKnight again provided the majority of the album, he also consulted musicians Anthony "Joint Custody" Nance, Rockwilder, and production duo The Underdogs to work with him. As with previous album Superhero (2001), he also enlisted several high-profile guest vocalists, including singers Carl Thomas, Joe, and Tank as well as rappers Nelly and Fabolous.

The album earned generally mixed reviews, with critics praising McKnight’s vocals and polished blend of contemporary R&B and hip hop while others criticized its bland production, safe songwriting, and lack of distinction. U-Turn debuted and peaked at number seven on the US Billboard 200. In addition, it reached number four on the Top R&B/Hip-Hop Albums and was eventually certified gold by the Recording Industry Association of America (RIAA). Lead single "Shoulda, Woulda, Coulda" entered the top forty of Billboard's Hot R&B/Hip-Hop Songs and received a Grammy Award nomination for Best Male R&B Vocal Performance.

== Background ==
Following his sixth studio album Superhero (2001), which debuted at number seven on US Billboard 200 and sold more than 870,000 copies domestically, McKnight continued to expand beyond the contemporary R&B sound associated with his earlier work on his next project, U-Turn. The album further developed his growing interest in hip hop, building on the genre experimentation of Superhero while incorporating collaborations with rappers Nelly, Fabolous, and Six John, as well as hip hop producer Rockwilder. At the same time, McKnight retained the romantic ballads that had long been central to his music, alongside R&B, soul, and inspirational material. McKnight described U-Turn as a "coming out” and “reinvention," reflecting changes in his personal life, including becoming single, his children growing older, and a change in management. He also acknowledged the growing influence of hip hop on contemporary radio, explaining that the album was intended to incorporate elements of both hip hop and R&B while remaining accessible to mainstream audiences.

== Critical reception ==
Professional ratings
Review scores
Source	Rating
AllMusic	3/5 stars
The Rolling Stone Album Guide	3/5 stars
Slant	2/5 stars

AllMusic editor John Bush found that U-Turn "isn't the change of direction hinted at in the title; in fact, it's very close to format, with a pair of rap features but plenty of space for McKnight's earnest, heartfelt crooning. Over half the album was not only written by McKnight but performed and produced by him as well, and although his writing is among the best in R&B, the backing tracks are bland meldings of piano, synthesized strings, and canned beats. No surprise then, that the best tracks here are the ones where he can focus on his voice." Maurice Bottomley from PopMatters felt that the album "sees him making more concessions to current musical styles while retaining his fondness for the sentimental balladry that is constant trademark [...] Mainstream and safe, certainly – but McKnight always has been – it is arguably as well-crafted a parcel of post-millennium soul as you could wish for."

Billboard praised U-Turn for balancing McKnight's signature smooth R&B with hip hop influences, highlighting collaborations with Nelly, Fabolous, and Six John while noting that tracks such as “Shoulda, Woulda, Coulda” retained his established ballad-driven sound. In a contemporary review, The Rolling Stone Album Guide wrote that "U-Turn successfully mixed mild, Superhero-style hip hop with McKnight's usual smooth jams." Slant editor Sal Cinquemani called the album "so nondescript, filled with the kind of faceless R&B that sells millions but does little to resurrect a genre increasingly eclipsed by hip-hop, that I couldn’t find anything to say about it at all."

== Chart performance ==
U-Turn debuted and peaked at number seven on the US Billboard 200 in the week of April 4, 2003, selling 109,000 units in its first week of release. On May 13, 2003, the album was certified gold by the Recording Industry Association of America (RIAA) for shipments in excess of 500,000 copies. By February 2005, it had sold 440,000 copies in the United States.

== Track listing ==
U-Turn track listing
No.	Title	Writer(s)	Producer(s)	Length
1.	"All Night Long" (featuring Nelly)	Brian McKnight; Anthony Nance; Cornell Haynes, Jr.; Damon Thomas; Harvey Mason Jr.	Joint Custody	4:16
2.	"Back Seat (Gettin' Down)"	McKnight	McKnight	4:31
3.	"Shoulda, Woulda, Coulda"	McKnight; Nance; Thomas; Mason; Antonio Dixon; Eric Dawkins	The Underdogs	4:01
4.	"Try Our Love Again"	McKnight	McKnight	3:58
5.	"Where Do We Go from Here"	McKnight	McKnight	4:22
6.	"Been So Long"	McKnight; Brandon Barnes	McKnight	3:34
7.	"Good Enough" (featuring Carl Thomas, Joe, Tank, & Tyrese)	McKnight; C. Thomas; Joe Thomas; Durrell Babbs; Tyrese Gibson	McKnight	4:30
8.	"Someday, Someway, Somehow"	McKnight; Barnes	McKnight	4:43
9.	"For the Rest of My Life"	McKnight; Peter Andre	McKnight	3:35
10.	"If It Was Cool"/"I Don't Know Yet (Interlude)"	McKnight; Barnes	McKnight	5:55
11.	"U-Turn" (featuring Fabolous & Six John)	McKnight; Al Green; Mabon "Teenie" Hodges	Rockwilder	4:32
12.	"So Sorry"	McKnight	McKnight	4:33
13.	"One of the Ones Who Did" (featuring Kirk Franklin)	McKnight	McKnight	4:53

Japan bonus track
No.	Title	Writer(s)	Producer(s)	Length
14.	"Over"	McKnight	McKnight	4:20

Samples

- "U-Turn" contains a sample of "Love and Happiness", performed by Al Green.

== Charts ==
=== Weekly charts ===
Weekly chart performance for U-Turn
Chart (2003)	Peak position
French Albums (SNEP)	148
US Billboard 200	7
US Top R&B/Hip-Hop Albums (Billboard)	4

=== Year-end charts ===
Year-end chart performance for U-Turn
Chart (2003)	Position
US Top R&B/Hip-Hop Albums (Billboard)	82

== Certifications ==
Certifications and sales for U-Turn
Region	Certification	Certified units/sales
United States (RIAA)	Gold	440,000
