= Brian McKnight =

American singer-songwriter and record producer (born 1969)

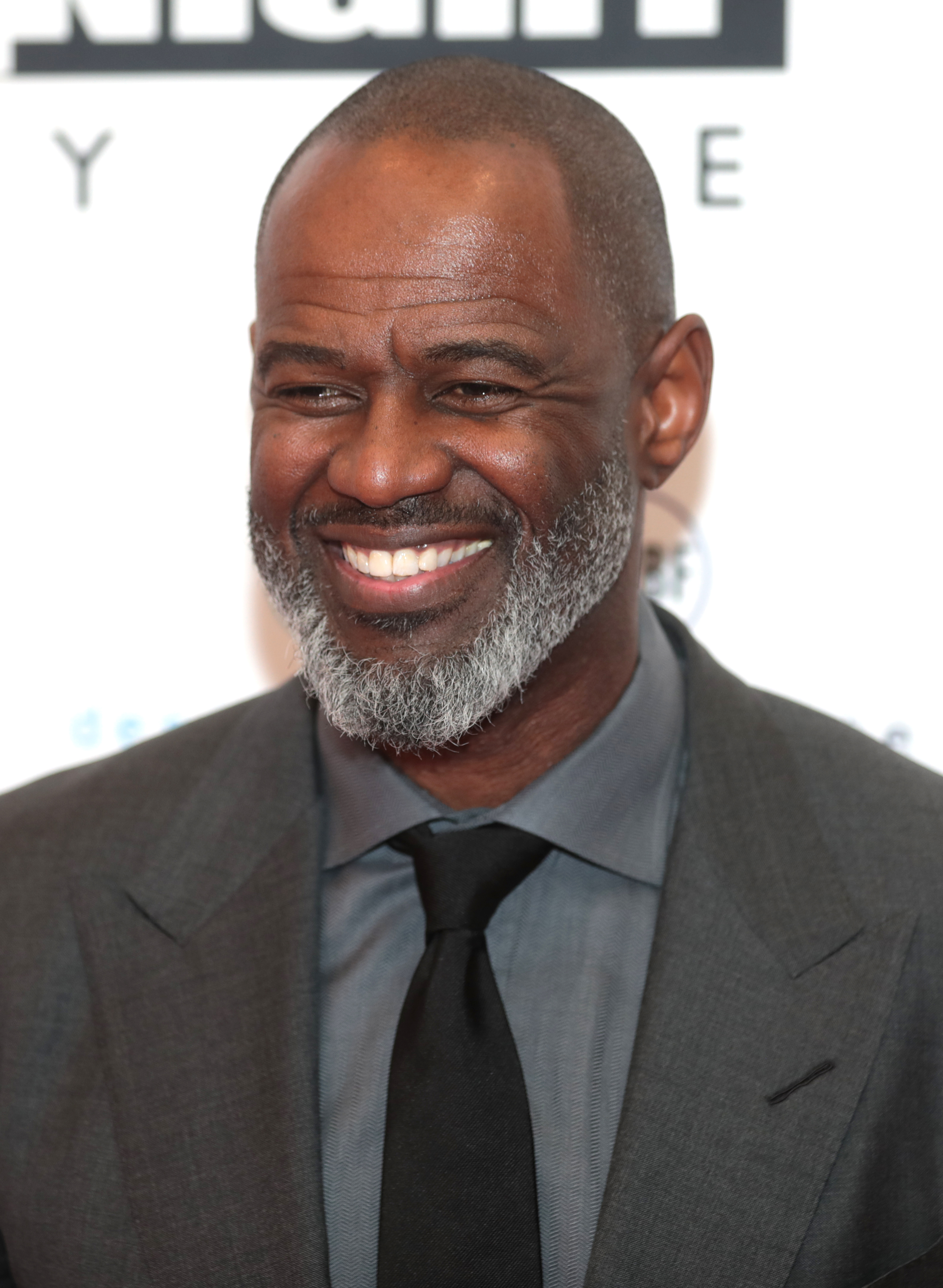
- McKnight at the 2019 Celebrity Fight Night in Phoenix
- Born: Brian Kelly McKnight; June 5, 1969 (age 57); Buffalo, New York, U.S.
- Occupations: Singer; songwriter; record producer; multi-instrumentalist; arranger
- Years active: 1988–present
- Works: Discography; filmography; production
- Spouses: Julie McKnight (m. 1990; div. 2003) Leilani Mendoza (m. 2017)
- Children: 5
- Awards: Full list
- Musical career
- Origin: Orlando, Florida, U.S.
- Genres: R&B; soul
- Instruments: Vocals; piano; keyboards; guitar; bass guitar; trumpet; flugelhorn; trombone; tuba; drums; percussion
- Labels: SoNo; Universal; Kobalt; E1; Razor & Tie; Warner Bros.; Motown; Polygram; Mercury; Wing
- Formerly of: Black Men United
- Website: mcknight360.com

Brian Kainoa Makoa McKnight Sr. (born Brian Kelly McKnight; June 5, 1969) is an American singer-songwriter, record producer, radio personality, and multi-instrumentalist. An R&B performer, he is recognized for his strong head voice, high belting range, and melisma.

McKnight was raised in Orlando, Florida, and moved to Los Angeles to pursue a musical career at the age of 19. He signed with Mercury Records to release his 1992 debut single, "The Way Love Goes", which preceded his debut album Brian McKnight (1992). A modest success, the album received platinum certification from the Recording Industry Association of America (RIAA) and spawned his first hit song, "One Last Cry", which peaked at number 13 on the Billboard Hot 100. The following year, he recorded the duet "Love Is" (with Vanessa Williams) for the Beverly Hills, 90210 soundtrack; the song peaked at number three on the chart. His 1997 single, "You Should Be Mine (Don't Waste Your Time)" (featuring Mase) peaked within the chart's top 20 and led his third album, Anytime (1997)—his final release with Mercury before he signed with Motown. His 1999 single, "Back at One" peaked at number two on the Billboard Hot 100 and remains his highest-charting song; it preceded the album of the same name (1999), which was the first of four of his albums—Superhero (2001), U Turn (2003), and Gemini (2005)—to consecutively debut within the top ten of the Billboard 200. His ninth album, Ten (2006) marked his final major label release.

He has received 16 Grammy Award nominations, third only to Zubin Mehta and Snoop Dogg for having the most nominations for the award without a win.

== Early life ==
McKnight was born in Buffalo, New York to Claude McKnight, Jr. and Ruth Elaine Willis. His introduction to music was joining his church choir as a child; it was directed by his grandfather. Brian and his family moved to Orlando, Florida when he was about 10. His father worked for Martin Marietta. He began composing instrumental material while learning to play several instruments.

His brothers graduated from Lake Howell High School in Winter Park, Florida and the family moved to Orange County, Florida. Brian McKnight then went to Maynard Evans High School in Orlando. McKnight formed a band and began performing original songs at local venues. By 18, he was offered a publishing deal and left for Los Angeles when he was about 19.

== Career ==
=== Mercury Records: Brian McKnight and Anytime (1990–1997) ===
McKnight's older brother, Claude V. McKnight III (and Claude's band Take 6), signed a record deal with Warner Brothers subsidiary Reprise Records in 1987, releasing their first album in early 1988 and encouraging Brian to shop his own demo tapes. By the age of 19 he signed his first recording deal with a subsidiary of Mercury Records, Wing Records. His debut album Brian McKnight was released in 1992, and peaked at number 58 on the Billboard 200 chart. His first release was "The Way Love Goes", which peaked at number 11 on the Billboard Top R&B/Hip-Hop Albums chart. The album also featured the ballad and Top 20 single, "One Last Cry". It was followed by two more albums for Mercury, I Remember You (1995) and Anytime (1997). Anytime, McKnight's final album with Mercury, sold over two million copies and was nominated for a Grammy. The video for "Anytime", directed by Darren Grant, was nominated for Best Male Video at the 1998 MTV Video Music Awards. In 1997, McKnight recorded "Remember the Magic" for Walt Disney World's 25th anniversary. After the release of his debut album, McKnight was part of the group Black Men United alongside Gerald Levert, his then-labelmate Joe, Christopher Williams, Boyz II Men, and others for the song "U Will Know", appeared and co-produced (alongside D'Angelo) on the soundtrack to the 1994 film Jason's Lyric.

=== Motown Records: Bethlehem and Back at One (1998–2004) ===
McKnight signed with Motown in 1998 and released a Christmas album, Bethlehem, the first of five albums he released on Motown. In 1998, he was a guest star on the show Sister Sister. He appeared in multiple episodes, as Tia and Tamera's college professor. That same year, he recorded a duet with Mariah Carey on a song that named "Whenever You Call" that was released as a bonus track in Carey's #1's compilation. The duet is also featured in the 25th anniversary edition of Carey's Butterfly album.

In 1999, McKnight released Back at One, his most successful album to date, which eventually went on to sell over three million copies. Additionally, Back at One is one of four of McKnight's studio albums to reach the Top 10 on the Billboard 200 albums chart, reaching number 7 on October 9, 1999. In 2004, he co-wrote the song "Wait" with Australian soul artist Guy Sebastian, which appeared on Sebastian's Beautiful Life album.

=== Warner Brothers: Ten and performances (2005–2014) ===
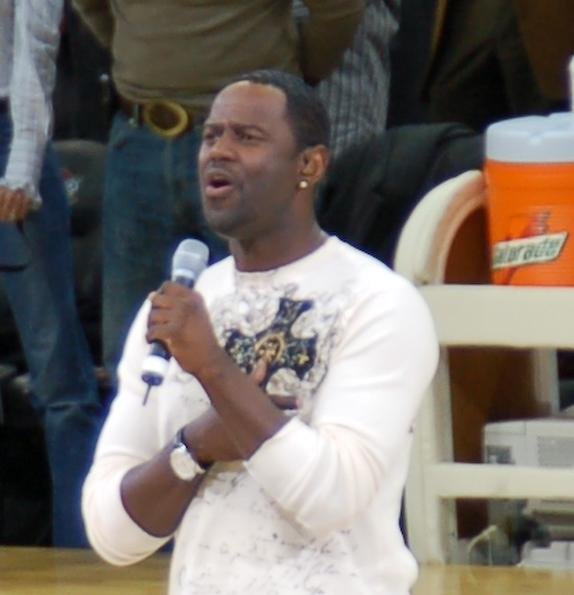
McKnight performing in 2006

In early 2005, McKnight made a cameo appearance in Mariah Carey's "It's Like That" music video directed by Brett Ratner. In late 2005, McKnight signed with Warner Bros. Records and released the album Ten during December 2006. It was his only studio album with the label. Three singles were released from the album: "Find Myself in You" (which originally appeared on the soundtrack to the 2006 Tyler Perry movie Madea's Family Reunion), "Used to Be My Girl" and "What's My Name". In October 2007, McKnight made his Broadway debut in the show Chicago.

Between 2006 and 2010, McKnight hosted The Brian McKnight Morning Show, a radio show with Pat Prescott on KTWV The Wave in Los Angeles. The show was briefly simulcast on KHJZ-FM, Smooth Jazz 95.7 The Wave in Houston. In January 2009, McKnight hosted "The Brian McKnight Show" on 98.7 KISS-FM in New York City. In 2009, he appeared as a performer in the eighth season of The Celebrity Apprentice. Each celebrity played to raise money for the charity of his or her choice. He elected to play for Youthville USA. Between September 2009 and May 2010, he hosted The Brian McKnight Show, a late night talk show billed as a combination of talk and variety which aired in syndication. McKnight sang the national anthem for MLB Opening Day in Cincinnati, Ohio with his sons Brian, Jr. and Niko on March 31, 2011. He had sung the national anthem for the 1997 NBA All-Star Game in Cleveland, Game 6 of the 2002 World Series in Anaheim, California (near his Los Angeles home), and the 2005 Major League Baseball All-Star Game in Detroit. He has sung the anthem throughout his career at numerous places. He sang "God Bless America" in the 7th inning of Game 7 of the National League Championship Series in San Francisco on October 22, 2012.

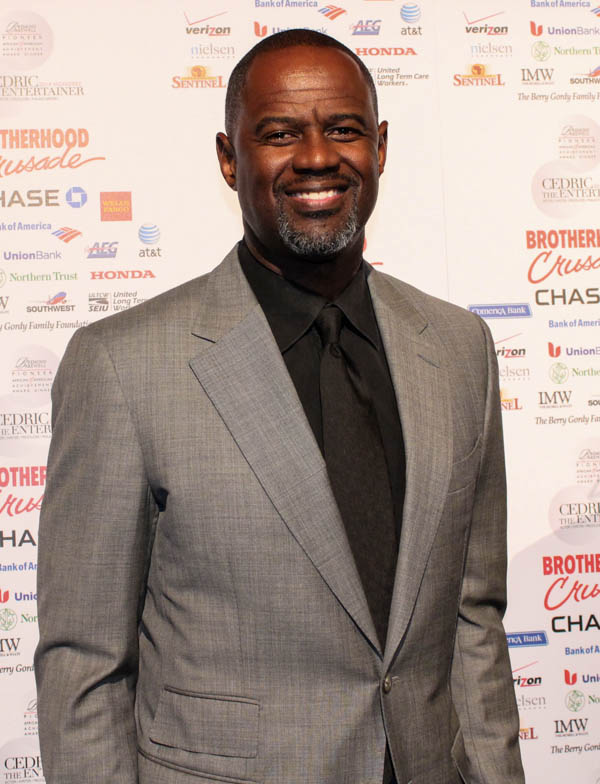
McKnight at the 2014 Pioneer of African American Achievement Awards Gala in Beverly Hills, California

On April 23, 2012, McKnight posted to YouTube "If You're Ready To Learn", which has been characterized by Billboard as a "filthy jam". Billboard selected this lyric from the song to quote: "Let me show you how your __ works / Since you didn't bring it to me first." Other media outlets including MTV, the Toronto Sun, and NewMediaRockstars have written about McKnight's recent, more adult-oriented efforts. Soon after the single's release, McKnight and Funny or Die revealed that the single was a collaboration between the two. McKnight later explained that he wrote the parody as a commentary on the state of R&B, which he noted was in a period of degradation overall with famous radio station 98.7 Kiss FM shuttering and hit singles being inferior quality music, among other ailments.

=== Brian McKnight Music and Kobalt: Better (2015–2016) ===
On August 14, 2015, McKnight released the single "Uh Oh Feeling", the first track from his album Better. It was released on his own label, Brian McKnight Music LLC via Kobalt Label Services. Better was released on February 26, 2016 and the album received positive reviews.

=== SoNo Recording: An Evening with... and Genesis (2016–present) ===
On September 23, 2016 (twenty years from the date of his studio album Anytime), McKnight released his first live CD, DVD and Blu-ray collection entitled An Evening with Brian McKnight (in partnership with independent recording label, SoNo Recording Group, via Universal Music Group). The concert was recorded at the historic Saban Theatre in Beverly Hills, California. The release includes fourteen songs performed live with his full band, plus three newly written and recorded songs. The first single, "Everything", was in the Top 20 on the national Adult Contemporary charts in September 2016. The CD version of the concert debuted on the Billboard R&B chart at No. 13, as a Hot Shot Debut. Also included is a duet with Gino Vannelli, on the song "Brothers in the End". The Blu-ray and DVD version of the release premiered on the Billboard Music DVD chart at number 9.

McKnight released the album Genesis on August 25, 2017. It featured three Top 30 Urban AC and AC hits: "Everything", "Forever" and "I Want U". Genesis premiered on the Nielsen SoundScan Top 10 Current R&B Albums and Top 20 Current Hip Hop/R&B Albums. The album was produced by Tim Kelley of the duo Tim & Bob. In January 2018, McKnight was nominated for two NAACP Image Awards. He was nominated for Outstanding Male Artist and Outstanding Album for Genesis (alongside Bruno Mars, Charlie Wilson, Kendrick Lamar, Jay-Z and Mary J Blige). In May 2018, McKnight announced that he was working on his next studio album tentatively titled Bedtime Story, which would be 60 minutes of music "for the bedroom aka baby-making music". In 2021, Brian McKnight competed on The Masked Singer spin-off The Masked Dancer as "Cricket".

== Personal life ==
McKnight was married from 1990–2003 to singer-songwriter, Julie McKnight, and they have two sons. Brian also has a daughter he fathered from a previous relationship. He had been estranged from his son Niko for many years, dating back to the elder McKnight publicly referring to his oldest children—Niko and older brother Brian Jr.—as being "products of sin". On May 30, 2025, Niko died of cancer.

In 2014, Brian McKnight and Leilani Malia Mendoza, a pediatric neurophysiologist, began dating and they announced their engagement in May 2017. On December 29, 2017, McKnight and Mendoza were married. Mendoza has two children from a previous relationship. McKnight and Mendoza had a son who died in infancy. In December 2022, McKnight and Mendoza had another son, Brian Kainoa Makoa Jr. McKnight legally changed his name to Brian Kainoa Makoa McKnight Sr. matching his son's name.

=== Religion ===
Brian McKnight grew up a Seventh-day Adventist. Religion was important in the McKnight family, with many generations being Seventh-day Adventists. His grandfather was a pastor of a church, and his mother played the piano and sang in a gospel choir in Emanuel Temple in Buffalo, New York. Being the youngest of four boys, McKnight became a member of an a cappella gospel quartet with his brothers. He also attended Oakwood College, a Seventh-day Adventist university in Huntsville, Alabama, from 1987 to 1989. In his second year, he got into trouble for violating Oakwood's rules about dormitory visitors for having his girlfriend in his dorm room. They were both expelled.

== Discography ==
Studio albums

- Brian McKnight (1992)
- I Remember You (1995)
- Anytime (1997)
- Bethlehem (1998)
- Back at One (1999)
- Superhero (2001)
- U Turn (2003)
- Gemini (2005)
- Ten (2006)
- I'll Be Home for Christmas (2008)
- Evolution of a Man (2009)
- Just Me (2011)
- More Than Words (2013)
- Better (2016)
- Genesis (2017)
- Exodus (2020)

== Filmography ==
=== Film ===
Year	Title	Role	Notes
2000	A Diva's Christmas Carol	Himself	TV movie
2003	The Beat	Record Executive	
2005	Leverage	Joe	
2009	Black Dynamite	Sweet Meat	
2011	Cheaper to Keep Her	Raymond Mays	Video
2012	Note to Self	Doctor William Thompson	
2012	Fuzzy Giners	Professor	Short
2013	The Country Christmas Story	Danny Gibson	TV movie
2017	Sandy Wexler	Testimonial	
2017	Naked	Himself	

=== Television ===
Year	Title	Role	Notes
1993	Stanley T in Da House	Himself	Episode: "Boyz II Men"
1993	The Mickey Mouse Club	Himself	Episode: "Episode #6.18"
1993–01	Showtime at the Apollo	Himself	Recurring Guest
1993–05	Soul Train	Himself	Recurring Guest
1994	Martin	Himself	Episode: "Love Is in Your Face: Part 2"
1995	New York Undercover	Himself	Episode: "CAT"
1995	Midnight Mac	Himself	Episode: "Episode #1.1"
1996	Living Single	Himself	Episode: "Wake Up to the Breakup"
1996	Martin	Himself	Episode: "Where the Party At"
1997	The Steve Harvey Show	Himself	Episode: "Coming to Chicago"
1998	Beverly Hills, 90210	Himself	Episode: "Ready or Not"
1998	Soul Train Lady of Soul Awards	Himself/Co-Host	Main Co-Host
1998	Soul Train Christmas Starfest	Himself/Host	Main Host
1998–99	Sister, Sister	Keith/Clarence	Recurring Cast: Season 6
1999	Mad TV	Himself	Episode: "Episode #4.16"
1999	Soul Train Music Awards	Himself/Co-Host	Main Co-Host
2000	Hollywood Squares	Himself/Panelist	Recurring Panelist
2001	Who Wants to Be a Millionaire	Himself/Contestant	Episode: "Top of the Charts Edition, Show 2-4"
2001	The Wayne Brady Show	Himself	Episode: "Pilot"
2001	The Parkers	Himself	Episode: "Crazy Love"
2001	Say It Loud: A Celebration of Black Music in America	Himself	Main Guest
2001	VH1 Presents the 80's	Himself	Episode: "Hip Hop/R&B"
2002	My Wife and Kids	Himself	Episode: "Anniversary"
2003	Star Search	Himself/Guest Judge	Episode: "The One with Singer Brian McKnight"
2003	American Juniors	Himself/Guest Judge	Episode: "Episode #1.9" & "#1.10"
2003	MTV Cribs	Himself	Episode: "Oct 13, 2003"
2003	Pyramid	Himself/Celebrity Contestant	Episode: "Oct 16, 2003"
2003	Platinum	Mace	Episode: "Power"
2004	The Chris Isaak Show	Himself	Episode: "Home Improvement"
2004	Soundstage	Himself	Episode: "Chris Isaak Christmas"
2005	American Dreams	Stokely Carmichael	Episode: "The Commencement"
2006	Celebrity Duets	Himself	Episode: "Episode #1.2"
2007	Hey Paula	Himself	Episode: "All That Glitters"
2008	Secret Talents of the Stars	Himself/Judge	Episode: "Episode #1.1"
2008	America's Got Talent	Himself	Episode: "Episode #3.20"
2008	Great Performances	Himself	Episode: "Hit Man: David Foster and Friends"
2009	The Apprentice	Himself/Contestant	Contestant: Season 8
2009–10	The Brian McKnight Show	Himself/Host	Main Host
2012	Ordinary People, Extraordinary Lives	Himself	Episode: "A Place Called Home"
2012	The Mumblesteens	Himself	Episode: "Secret Lover"
2013	Shark Tank	Himself	Episode: "Hamboards, Scan, ScreenMend, Sunday Night Slow Jams"
2013	Minute Motivations	Himself	Episode: "Holiday Special"
2015	Hollywood in Vienna	Himself	Episode: "Hollywood in Vienna 2015: Tales of Mystery"
2015–16	Celebrity Name Game	Himself/Celebrity Player	Episode: "Brian McKnight & Nia Vardalos 1-3"
2017	Grown Folks	Pastor	Episode: "Take 'em to Church"
2021	The Masked Dancer	Contestant/Cricket	Main Contestant
2021	American Idol	Himself	Episode: "410 (All Star Duets and Solos)"
2022	Star Tracker	Himself	Episode: "The Pursuit of the Dream"
2022	Atlanta	Himself	Episode: "The Goof Who Sat By the Door"

== Awards and nominations ==
Award	Year	Nominee/work	Category	Result
American Music Awards	1999	Brian McKnight	Favorite Soul/R&B Male Artist	Nominated
American Music Awards	1999	Anytime	Favorite Soul/R&B Album	Nominated
BET Awards	2007	Brian McKnight	BET J Cool Like Dat Award	Nominated
Grammy Awards	1994	"Love Is" with Vanessa Williams	Best Pop Performance by a Duo or Group with Vocals	Nominated
Grammy Awards	1999	"Anytime"	Best Male Pop Vocal Performance	Nominated
Grammy Awards	1999	"The Only One For Me"	Best Male R&B Vocal Performance	Nominated
Grammy Awards	2000	Back at One	Best R&B Album	Nominated
Grammy Awards	2000	"Back at One"	Best Short Form Music Video	Nominated
Grammy Awards	2001	"6, 8, 12"	Best Male Pop Vocal Performance	Nominated
Grammy Awards	2001	"Stay or Let It Go"	Best Male R&B Vocal Performance	Nominated
Grammy Awards	2001	"Coming Back Home" with BeBe Winans & Joe	Best R&B Performance by a Duo or Group with Vocals	Nominated
Grammy Awards	2002	"Still"	Best Male Pop Vocal Performance	Nominated
Grammy Awards	2002	"My Kind of Girl" with Justin Timberlake	Best Pop Collaboration with Vocals	Nominated
Grammy Awards	2002	"Love of My Life"	Best Male R&B Vocal Performance	Nominated
Grammy Awards	2002	"Love of My Life"	Best R&B Song	Nominated
Grammy Awards	2002	"Win" from Men of Honor	Best Song Written for a Motion Picture, Television or Other Visual Media	Nominated
Grammy Awards	2003	"All the Way" with Kenny G	Best R&B Performance by a Duo or Group with Vocals	Nominated
Grammy Awards	2004	"Shoulda, Coulda, Woulda"	Best Male R&B Vocal Performance	Nominated
Grammy Awards	2005	"What We Do Here"	Best Male R&B Vocal Performance	Nominated
MTV Video Music Awards	1998	"Anytime"	Best Male Video	Nominated
MTV Video Music Awards	2000	"Back at One"	Best R&B Video	Nominated
NAACP Image Awards	2000	"Back at One"	Outstanding Male Artist	Won
NAACP Image Awards	2001	"Stay or Let It Go"	Outstanding Male Artist	Nominated
NAACP Image Awards	2002	Superhero	Outstanding Male Artist	Nominated
NAACP Image Awards	2018	Genesis	Outstanding Male Artist	Nominated
NAACP Image Awards	2018	Genesis	Outstanding Album	Nominated
Pop Awards	2018	Brian McKnight	Lifetime Achievement Award	Nominated
Soul Train Music Awards	1999	"Anytime"	Best R&B/Soul Single, Male	Won
Soul Train Music Awards	2000	"Back at One"	Best R&B/Soul Single, Male	Nominated
Soul Train Music Awards	2000	Back at One	Best R&B/Soul Album, Male	Nominated
Soul Train Music Awards	2002	"Love of My Life"	Best R&B/Soul Single, Male	Nominated
