= The Way Love Goes (Brian McKnight song) =

Single by Brian McKnight

from the album Brian McKnight
- Released: 1992
- Genre: R&B
- Length: 5:07 (album version); 4:15 (single edit)
- Label: Mercury
- Songwriters: Brian McKnight; Brandon Barnes
- Producers: Brian McKnight; Brandon Barnes

Brian McKnight singles chronology
"The Way Love Goes" (1992)	"Goodbye My Love" (1992)

Music video
- "The Way Love Goes" on VH1.com

"The Way Love Goes" is a song co-written, co-produced and performed by American contemporary R&B singer Brian McKnight. It was issued as the lead single from his eponymous debut album. The song peaked at number 11 on the Billboard Hot R&B/Hip-Hop Songs chart in 1992. The song's release marked McKnight's introduction to the music industry as a solo recording artist.

== Personnel ==
- Brandon Barnes – drums and keyboard programming
- Louis Johnson – bass guitar
- Brian McKnight – Rhodes electric piano, acoustic guitar and background vocals
- Wah Wah Watson – electric guitar

== Music video ==
The official music video for the song was directed by Leta Warner.

== Charts ==
=== Weekly charts ===
Chart (1992)	Peak position
US Hot R&B/Hip-Hop Songs (Billboard)	11

=== Year-end charts ===
Chart (1992)	Position
US Hot R&B/Hip-Hop Songs (Billboard)	88
