= One Last Cry =

- US cassette single and European CD single

Single by Brian McKnight

from the album Brian McKnight
- B-side: "Goodbye My Love"
- Released: May 25, 1993
- Recorded: 1991
- Genre: R&B; pop; quiet storm; soul
- Length: 4:55 (album version); 4:26 (single edit)
- Label: Mercury
- Songwriters: Brian McKnight; Brandon Barnes; Melanie Barnes
- Producers: Brian McKnight; Brandon Barnes

Brian McKnight singles chronology
"Love Is" (1993)	"One Last Cry" (1993)	"After the Love" (1993)

Music video
- "One Last Cry" on YouTube

"One Last Cry" is a song performed by American singer Brian McKnight, issued as the fourth single from his eponymous debut album (1992) on May 25 1993 by Mercury Records. McKnight co-wrote and co-produced the track with Brandon and Melanie Barnes. It was McKnight's first solo hit on the US Billboard Hot 100 and Cash Box Top 100, peaking at numbers 13 and 14, respectively.

Since its release, "One Last Cry" has been covered by 10 other artists, which are: Backstreet Boys, Melinda Linder, Justin Timberlake, Marina Elali, Martin Nievera, Billy Crawford, Nina, Sabrina, Heather Headley and Peck Palitchoke.

In 2025, Melinda Lindner's cover of the song reached number 30 the Adult Contemporary chart.

== Personnel ==
- Clare Fischer – string arrangement
- Brian McKnight – keyboards
- John Willis – acoustic guitar

== Music video ==
The official music video for the song was directed by Leta Warner.

== Charts ==
=== Weekly charts ===
Chart (1993)	Peak position
Canada Retail Singles (The Record)	19
Canada Top Singles (RPM)	53
US Billboard Hot 100	13
US Adult Contemporary (Billboard)	16
US Hot R&B/Hip-Hop Songs (Billboard)	8
US Pop Airplay (Billboard)	19
US Rhythmic Airplay (Billboard)	18
US Cash Box Top 100	14

=== Year-end charts ===
Chart (1993)	Position
US Billboard Hot 100	54
US Hot R&B/Hip-Hop Songs (Billboard)	36
