= Brian McKnight (album) =

Studio album by Brian McKnight
- Released: June 23, 1992
- Recorded: 1991–1992
- Genres: R&B; soul; smooth jazz
- Length: 63:15
- Label: Mercury
- Producers: Brian McKnight, Brandon Barnes

Brian McKnight chronology
Brian McKnight (1992)	I Remember You (1995)

Singles from Brian McKnight
- 1. "The Way Love Goes" Released: May 26, 1992; 2. "Goodbye My Love" Released: November 3, 1992; 3. "One Last Cry" Released: May 25, 1993; 4. "After the Love" Released: September 14, 1993

Brian McKnight is the debut studio album of R&B singer Brian McKnight, released on June 23, 1992 by Mercury Records. It features his then-highest-charting single, "One Last Cry", which peaked at number 13 on the US Billboard Hot 100 and sold 500,000 copies. The album was certified platinum by the Recording Industry Association of America.

== Critical response ==
Professional ratings
Review scores
Source	Rating
AllMusic	4/5 stars
Entertainment Weekly	A

Brian McKnight received positive reviews from most music critics. Entertainment Weekly writer Havelock Nelson, gave the album an A-rating citing that "McKnight is the most comforting R&B singer-songwriter to emerge since Keith Washington early last year."

== Track listing ==
No.	Title	Writer(s)	Length
1.	"Yours"	Brian McKnight, Gerry Brown, Phase 5	4:42
2.	"The Way Love Goes"	Brian McKnight, Brandon Barnes	5:07
3.	"Goodbye My Love"	Brian McKnight, Brandon Barnes	4:24
4.	"Love Me, Hold Me"	Brian McKnight, Brandon Barnes, Victor Brooks	4:56
5.	"After the Love"	Brian McKnight, Brandon Barnes	5:27
6.	"One Last Cry"	Brian McKnight, Brandon Barnes, Melanie Barnes	4:55
7.	"Never Felt This Way"	Brian McKnight, Brandon Barnes	5:36
8.	"I Couldn't Say"	Brian McKnight, Brandon Barnes	5:45
9.	"Stay the Night"	Brian McKnight, Brandon Barnes, Melanie Barnes	5:34
10.	"Is the Feeling Gone"	Brian McKnight, Brandon Barnes, Edward Martin	4:02
11.	"I Can't Go for That (No Can Do)"	Daryl Hall, John Oates, Sara Allen	5:05
12.	"Oh Lord"	Brian McKnight, Brandon Barnes	4:24
13.	"My Prayer"	Brian McKnight, Brandon Barnes	3:18

== Personnel ==
All instruments performed by Brian McKnight except where noted.

- David Anderson – bass guitar (track 12)
- Brandon Barnes – drums and keyboard programming (tracks 2 and 9)
- James Blair – drums (track 12)
- Gerry Brown – backing vocals (track 1)
- Cedric Dent – piano (track 10)
- Clare Fischer – strings (tracks 6 and 10)
- The Four Horns – horn arrangements (track 1)
- Louis Johnson – bass guitar (tracks 2 and 4)
- Kipper Jones – backing vocals (track 11)
- Ricky Lawson – drums (tracks 5, 8 and 9)
- Fred McFarlane – keyboards (track 11)
- Claude McKnight – backing vocals (tracks 10 and 13)
- Fred McKnight – lead guitar (track 8)
- Julie McKnight – backing vocals (track 4)
- B.J. Nelson – backing vocals (track 11)
- Kelly O'Neal – saxophone (track 12)
- Phase 5 – drum programming (tracks 1, 3 and 11), keyboard programming (track 1)
- John R. Robinson – drums (track 10)
- Neil Stubenhaus – bass guitar (track 10)
- Take 6 (Claude V. McKnight, Mark Kibble, David Thomas) – backing vocals (track 10)
- Darryl Tibbs – percussion (track 12)
- Wah Wah Watson – electric guitar (tracks 1 and 2)
- Vanessa Williams – backing vocals (track 1)
- John Willis – lead guitar (track 9), acoustic guitar (track 6)

== Charts ==
=== Weekly charts ===
Chart (1992)	Peak position
US Billboard 200	58
US Top R&B/Hip-Hop Albums (Billboard)	17

=== Year-end charts ===
Chart (1992)	Position
US Top R&B/Hip-Hop Albums (Billboard)	75
Chart (1993)	Position
US Top R&B/Hip-Hop Albums (Billboard)	44

== Certifications ==
Region	Certification	Certified units/sales
United States (RIAA)	Platinum	1,000,000^{^}
^{^} Shipments figures based on certification alone.
