= SoulTracks =

American online music magazine

- Website type: Online magazine
- Available in: English
- Creator: Chris Rizik
- Editor: Melody Charles
- Website: soultracks.com
- Commercial: yes
- Registration: no
- Launched: 2003; 23 years ago
- Current status: Active

SoulTracks is an American online magazine that publishes music reviews, biographies and news. The website was founded in 2003 by Chris Rizik, and by its fourth year of operation was characterized as "the nation's most popular soul music website with over 3 million annual visits." CBS news has reported that SoulTracks annual "Readers' Choice Awards" are "the leading awards in the world celebrating independent soul music."

== History ==
SoulTracks was established in 2003 as a digital platform dedicated to contemporary and classic soul music at a time when mainstream coverage of the genre had declined. Founder Chris Rizik, a Michigan venture capitalist and CEO of Renaissance Venture Capital, created the site to provide consistent editorial coverage of soul and R&B artists and releases. Over time, the publication has expanded its editorial scope to include features, retrospectives, RSS feeds, events, and multiple curated Spotify playlists. SoulTracks's website is visited worldwide from 140 countries, with its core audience located in the US, UK, Germany, France and Italy.

== Editorial focus ==
The site primarily covers soul, R&B, and related genres, including neo-soul and contemporary jazz-influenced vocal music. Its content includes music news, album reviews, artist interviews, and feature articles highlighting trends within the genre as well as new music, including its "First Listen", "Lost Gems", and "Another Groove" series. Regular contributors include Howard Dukes, formerly a senior reporter for the South Bend Tribune, Justin Kantor, a music journalist for AllMusic, and Robb Patryk, a partner and music lawyer at Hughes Hubbard & Reed, among others.

Since founding SoulTracks in 2003, publisher and editor Chris Rizik has served as the publication’s primary editorial voice, writing commentary and features focused on soul and R&B music. Rizik has been interviewed by media outlets and podcasts regarding the evolution of soul music and SoulTracks, independent music journalism, and the role of SoulTracks within the genre community.

== Influence & Use ==
In his published research guide to soul and R&B music, Professor Eddie S. Meadows recommends SoulTracks as a resource, noting that "[t]he site is thorough and easily navigated. The publisher, editor and writers have solid standing in blues scholarship." The Archives of African American Music and Culture at Indiana University also recommends Soultracks as an "[o]nline resource dedicated to classic and modern soul music." Reed College, Bellevue College and Northwestern University likewise also recommend the site to researchers of soul music. SoulTracks has been cited as a source in graduate-level music scholarship, including a Harvard doctoral dissertation, among others. Legal scholars at Chapman University Law Review cited SoulTracks when analyzing media reception surrounding high-profile copyright disputes in the peer-reviewed article "Casting the First Stone: The Future of Music Copyright Infringement Law After Blurred Lines, Stay with Me, and Uptown Funk". Faculty at the University of California, Riverside cited to SoulTracks when analyzing the rise of "yacht rock." Music magazines, newspapers, other online media as well as promoters and live music venues have also relied on SoulTracks as a source of biographical and other information about soul/R&B artists.

== SoulTracks Awards ==
SoulTracks presents the annual SoulTracks Readers' Choice Awards, which recognize artists and recordings in soul and R&B music. Urban music media in the US and abroad cover the winners.
