= I Remember You (Brian McKnight album) =

Studio album by Brian McKnight
- Released: August 8, 1995
- Genre: R&B
- Length: 66:22
- Label: Mercury
- Producer: Brian McKnight

Brian McKnight chronology
| Brian McKnight (1992) | I Remember You (1995) | Anytime (1997) |

Singles from I Remember You
- 1. "Crazy Love" Released: June 20, 1995; 2. "On the Down Low" Released: August 22, 1995; 3. "Still in Love" Released: October 31, 1995

I Remember You is the second studio album by American singer Brian McKnight. It was released by Mercury Records on August 8, 1995, in the United States. McKnight collaborated with Robin Thicke, Brandon Barnes, Clifton Davis, and Earl Rose on the songwriting for the album, while production was overseen by himself. Upon its release, the album received a mixed reception and entered the top five on the US Top R&B/Hip-Hop Albums chart. It was eventually certified gold by Recording Industry Association of America (RIAA) on October 10, 1995, and spawned the singles "Crazy Love," a Van Morrison cover, "On the Down Low" and "Still in Love."

== Background ==
McKnight produced I Remember You himself. While he had collected much of the album by January 1994 and expected to finish the album in June for an August 1994 release, other events such as a guest spot on hip hop duo Ill Al Skratch's hit single "I'll Take Her" delayed its release. In contrast to his approach for his self-titled debut album (1992), McKnight tried not to overdo on I Remember You, telling Billboard magazine in June 1995: "A lot of the vocals are first takes, and I didn't try to make it 'perfect' – the music has a lot looser feel to it this time." McKnight chose from 50 songs that he had recorded, and once he narrowed it down, he sequenced the album in three basic parts, with the four or five songs selected for their commercial appeal for urban audiences, the next three or four for what he called his "pop suite" and the last few songs which he considered his most personal and "most spiritual."

== Critical reception ==
Professional ratings
Review scores
| Source | Rating |
|---|---|
| AllMusic | 3/5 stars |
| The Rolling Stone Album Guide | 2.5/5 stars |

In her review for Vibe, Charisse Jones called I Remember You a "cross of chocolate pop and jazz-influenced soul." She found that the album "leaps from the speakers like a breath of fresh air [...] With I Remember You, McKnight proves, that less is more." AllMusic editor Ron Wynn felt that with the album "McKnight keeps it simple, mostly mellow, and love-oriented [...] There's not a lot to like or dislike about I Remember You, which may be the problem; it's so generic and reflective of everything and nothing that it doesn't do much for anyone who wants to be confronted, inspired, or even mildly stimulated. It's the ideal late-night quiet storm session, aimed at those who enjoy getting the ambience of R&B without the intensity."

Connie Johnsin, writing for Los Angeles Times, wrote: "McKnight has written for Boyz II Men, Vanessa Williams and Aaron Hall, and some of these tunes would have fared better in their hands. One or two songs like the syrupy title cut would have sufficed, but there are several here in the same vein. McKnight’s voice is pleasing, but his overall style is unforgivably bland." In a contemporary review, The Rolling Stone Album Guide wrote that "with similarly interchangeable ballads and the same sensitive-yet-rugged romanticism, his followup was a lot like his debut, only less so". Billboard called I Remember You an "exceptional album."

== Chart performance ==
In the United States, I Remember You peaked at number 22 on the Billboard 200. On Billboard's Top R&B/Hip-Hop Albums chart, it became McKnight's first album to enter the top five, reaching number four. According to Soundscan, I Remember You had sold 586,000 copies by August 1997. It was eventually certified gold by Recording Industry Association of America (RIAA). Billboard ranked the album 51st and 93rd in its Top R&B/Hip-Hop Albums year-end rankings in 1995 and 1996, respectively.

== Track listing ==
All tracks are produced by Brian McKnight.

I Remember You track listing
| No. | Title | Writer(s) | Length |
|---|---|---|---|
| 1. | "On the Down Low" | Brian McKnight | 4:58 |
| 2. | "On the Floor" | McKnight | 4:17 |
| 3. | "Your Love Is Ooh" | McKnight | 4:20 |
| 4. | "Up Around My Way" | McKnight; Quincy Jones; Leon Ware; Bruce Fisher; Stanley Richardson | 4:31 |
| 5. | "Anyway" | McKnight; Robin Thicke | 5:15 |
| 6. | "Still in Love" | McKnight; Brandon Barnes | 3:58 |
| 7. | "Every Beat of My Heart" | McKnight; Earl Rose | 4:07 |
| 8. | "I Remember You" | McKnight; Barnes | 5:00 |
| 9. | "Must Be Love" | McKnight; Barnes | 4:36 |
| 10. | "Crazy Love" | Van Morrison | 4:01 |
| 11. | "Marilie" | McKnight | 5:15 |
| 12. | "Kiss Your Love Goodbye" | McKnight; Clifton Davis | 5:08 |
| 13. | "You" | McKnight | 4:44 |
| 14. | "The Day the Earth Stood Still" | McKnight; Barnes | 4:38 |
| 15. | "Niko's Lullaby" | McKnight; Barnes | 1:37 |
| Total length: | | | 66:22 |

== Personnel ==
Credits adapted from the liner notes of I Remember You.

- Clare Fischer – String arrangements (tracks 6 and 8)
- Gary Grant – Horns (track 9)
- Jerry Hey – Horns (track 9)
- Lou McCreary – Horns (track 9
- Dale “Ashe” Stephen – Rap (track 4)
- Wayman Tisdale – Bass guitar (track 13)
- David T. Walker – Guitar (track 10)
- Wah Wah Watson – Guitar (tracks 3 and 10)

== Charts ==
=== Weekly charts ===
Weekly chart performance for I Remember You
| Chart (1995) | Peak position |
|---|---|
| US Billboard 200 | 22 |
| US Top R&B/Hip-Hop Albums (Billboard) | 4 |

=== Year-end charts ===
1995 year-chart performance for I Remember You
| Chart (1995) | Position |
|---|---|
| US Billboard 200 | 193 |
| US Top R&B/Hip-Hop Albums (Billboard) | 51 |

1996 year-chart performance for I Remember You
| Chart (1996) | Position |
|---|---|
| US Top R&B/Hip-Hop Albums (Billboard) | 93 |

== Certifications ==
Certifications for I Remember You
| Region | Certification | Certified units/sales |
|---|---|---|
| United States (RIAA) | Gold | 500,000^{^} |
^{^} Shipments figures based on certification alone.
