= Jon B. discography =

- Studio albums: 7
- Compilation albums: 3
- Singles: 25
- Mixtapes: 1

Jon B. is an American singer who has released seven studio albums, three compilation album, and more than two dozen singles. He debuted in 1995 with his album Bonafide which reached number seven on the Singaporean Albums Chart and peaked at 24 on the US Top R&B/Hip-Hop Albums, eventually reaching Gold status in the United States. It spawned the top ten hit "Someone to Love" featuring Babyface, another Gold-seller. Cool Relax, his second album with Yab Yum Records, 550 Music and Epic Records, was released in September 1997. Its double-sided lead single, consisting of "They Don't Know" and "Are U Still Down" featuring 2Pac, reached number two on the US Hot R&B/Hip-Hop Songs chart, with "They Don't Know" becoming another top ten on the US Billboard Hot 100. A top five success on the US Top R&B/Hip-Hop Albums chart, it was eventually certfified Platinum by the Recording Industry Association of America (RIAA).

Pleasures U Like, Job B.'s third album, marked his first album under Tracey Edmonds' label Edmonds Record Group which was formed after his previous label home Yab Yum Records had folded. It became his first top ten album in the United States, bowing at number six on the Billboard 200 and number three on the Top R&B/Hip-Hop Albums, selling 99,000 in its debut week. The album's two singles were less successful, though lead single "Don't Talk" became a top thirty in the United Kingdom. Following his departure from Epic Records, Jon B. signed with DreamWorks Records but the label folded in early 2004 before he got to release any material. In 2004, he was signed to Sanctuary Urban and released his fourth studio album Stronger Everyday which reached number 17 on the Top R&B/Hip-Hop Albums chart.

Jon B.'s next projects, the 2006 Christmas album Holiday Wishes: From Me to You as well as the 2008 studio album Helpless Romantic, were released independently through Arsenal Records. While Holiday Wishes failed to chart, the latter reached number 11 on the Top R&B/Hip-Hop Albums chart, becoming his highest-charting album since Pleasures U Like. The album title track and second single peaked at number 25 on the US Hot R&B/Hip-Hop Songs chart. Comfortable Swagg, Jon B.'s seventh album, was released in February 2012 via Vibezelect. Marking his first album in 13 years, the singer released his eighth album Waiting on You on March 21, 2025, again though Vibezelect.

== Albums ==
=== Studio albums ===
List of studio albums, with selected chart positions and certifications
Title	Album details	Peak chart positions		Certifications
Title	Album details	US	US R&B	Certifications
Bonafide	Released: May 23, 1995; Label: Yab Yum, 550, Epic; Format: CD, LP, cassette	79	24	RIAA: Gold
Cool Relax	Released: September 16, 1997; Label: Yab Yum, 550, Epic; Format: CD, LP, cassette	33	5	RIAA: Platinum
Pleasures U Like	Released: March 20, 2001; Label: Edmonds, Epic; Format: CD, LP, download	6	3	RIAA: Gold
Stronger Everyday	Released: October 5, 2004; Label: Sanctuary Urban, E2; Format: CD, download	140	17	
Holiday Wishes: From Me to You	Released: November 14, 2006; Label: Arsenal; Format: CD, download	—	—	
Helpless Romantic	Released: October 28, 2008; Label: Arsenal; Format: CD, download	109	11	
Comfortable Swagg	Released: February 14, 2012; Label: Vibezelect; Format: CD, download	—	—	
Waiting on You	Released: March 21, 2025; Label: Vibezelect; Format: CD, download	—	—	

=== Compilation albums ===
List of compilation albums with selected details
Title	Title
Love Hurts	Released: 1999; Label: Sony Music; Format: CD, cassette
Greatest Hits... Are U Still Down?	Released: March 26, 2002; Label: Sony Music; Format: CD, cassette, download
Love Elevation Suite	Released: January 29, 2013; Label: Vibezelect; Format: Digital download

== Mixtapes ==
- 2013: Digital Dynasty R&B 3

== Singles ==
List of singles as lead artist, with selected chart positions, certifications and album name
Title	Year	Peak chart positions			Certifications	Album
Title	Year	US	US R&B	UK	Certifications	Album
"Someone to Love" (featuring Babyface)	1995	10	7	98	US: Gold	Bonafide
"Pretty Girl"	1995	25	21	78		Bonafide
"Isn't It Scary"	1996	—	66	—		Bonafide
"Simple Melody" (featuring Bootsy Collins)	1996	—	—	—		Bonafide
"Don't Say"	1997	68	34	—		Cool Relax
"Are U Still Down" (Note: "Are U Still Down" and "They Don't Know" were issued together as a double-sided single. The two songs were listed as a single entry on the Billboard Hot R&B/Hip-Hop Songs chart because both were receiving substantial airplay at the publication's panel of R&B radio stations. On the Hot 100, each song was listed individually at different times over a single chart run, as neither title had reached the Hot 100 Airplay component chart when the latter overtook the former in airplay.) (featuring 2Pac)	1998	29	2	—	US: Platinum	Cool Relax
"They Don't Know"	1998	7	2	32	US: Platinum	Cool Relax
"I Do (Whatcha Say Boo)"	1998	117	18	—		Cool Relax
"Cool Relax"	1998	—	—	—		Cool Relax
"Don't Talk"	2001	58	21	29		Pleasures U Like
"Now I'm With You"	2001	—	117	—		Pleasures U Like
"Lately"	2004	—	—	68		Stronger Everyday
"Everytime"	2004	—	—	193		Stronger Everyday
"Ooh So Sexy" (featuring Paul Wall)	2008	—	98	—		Helpless Romantic
"Helpless Romantic"	2008	—	25	—		Helpless Romantic
"Only One"	2012	—	—	—		Comfortable Swagg
"Comfortable Swagg"	2012	—	—	—		Comfortable Swagg
"Understand" (featuring Donell Jones)	2019	—	—	—		Waiting on You
"Priceless"	2019	—	—	—		Waiting on You
"Waiting on You"	2023	—	—	—		Waiting on You
"Flirt'n" (with KayOne)	2024	—	—	—		Non-album singles
"Natural Drug"	2024	—	—	—		Waiting on You
