= Billboard Music Award for Top R&B Song =

Annual American music award

This page lists the winners and nominees for the Billboard Music Award for Top R&B Song. This award was first given in 1992 and since its conception, Pharrell Williams and The Weeknd are the only artists to win the award twice.

== Winners and nominees ==
Winners are listed first and highlighted in bold.

=== 1990s ===
Year	Song	Artist	Ref.
1992	**"Come and Talk to Me"**	**Jodeci**	
1993	**"I Will Always Love You"**	**Whitney Houston**	
1994	—N/a		
1995	**"Creep"**	**TLC**	
1995	"If You Love Me"	Brownstone	
1995	"One More Chance"	The Notorious B.I.G.	
1995	"This Is How We Do It"	Montell Jordan	
1996	**"You're Makin' Me High"**	**Toni Braxton**	
1996	"All the Things (Your Man Won't Do)"	Joe	
1996	"Down Low (Nobody Has to Know)"	R. Kelly (feat. The Isley Brothers)	
1996	"Tha Crossroads"	Bone Thugs-N-Harmony	
1997	**"In My Bed"**	**Dru Hill**	
1997	"Can't Nobody Hold Me Down"	Puff Daddy (feat. Mase)	
1997	"G.H.E.T.T.O.U.T."	Changing Faces	
1997	"I'll Be Missing You"	Puff Daddy (feat. Faith Evans and 112)	
1998	**"Too Close"**	**Next**	
1998	"Are U Still Down" / "They Don't Know"	Jon B.	
1998	"The Boy is Mine"	Brandy and Monica	
1998	"No, No, No"	Destiny's Child	
1999	**"Fortunate"**	**Maxwell**	
1999	"Heartbreak Hotel"	Whitney Houston (feat. Faith Evans and Kelly Price)	
1999	"No Scrubs"	TLC	
1999	"Nobody's Supposed to Be Here"	Deborah Cox	

=== 2000s ===
Year	Song	Artist	Ref.
2000	—N/a		
2001	**"Fiesta"**	**R. Kelly (feat. Jay Z)**	
2001	"Love"	Musiq	
2001	"Missing You"	Case	
2001	"Where the Party At"	Jagged Edge (feat. Nelly)	
2002	**"Foolish"**	**Ashanti**	
2002	"Halfcrazy"	Musiq	
2002	"Hot in Herre"	Nelly	
2002	"U Don't Have to Call"	Usher	
2003	—N/a		
2004	**"If I Ain't Got You"**	**Alicia Keys**	
2004	"Diary"	Alicia Keys	
2004	"Yeah!"	Usher (feat. Lil Jon and Ludacris)	
2005	**"Let Me Love You"**	**Mario**	
2005	"Lovers and Friends"	Lil Jon & The East Side Boyz (feat. Usher and Ludacris)	
2005	"Truth Is"	Fantasia	
2005	"We Belong Together"	Mariah Carey	
2006	**"Be Without You"**	**Mary J. Blige**	
2006	"It's Goin' Down"	Yung Joc	
2006	"So Sick"	Ne-Yo	
2006	"Unpredictable"	Jamie Foxx (feat. Ludacris)	
2007–09	—N/a		

=== 2010s ===
Year	Song	Artist	Ref.
2010	—N/a		
2011	**"OMG"**	**Usher (feat. Will.i.am)**	
2011	"Bottoms Up"	Trey Songz (feat. Nicki Minaj)	
2011	"There Goes My Baby"	Usher	
2011	"Un-Thinkable (I'm Ready)"	Alicia Keys	
2011	"What's My Name?"	Rihanna (feat. Drake)	
2012	**"Motivation"**	**Kelly Rowland (feat. Lil Wayne)**	
2012	"Down on Me"	Jeremih (feat. 50 Cent)	
2012	"Fuck You"	CeeLo Green	
2012	"She Ain't You"	Chris Brown	
2012	"Sure Thing"	Miguel	
2013	**"Diamonds"**	**Rihanna**	
2013	"Adorn"	Miguel	
2013	"Girl on Fire"	Alicia Keys (feat. Nicki Minaj)	
2013	"Heart Attack"	Trey Songz	
2013	"Thinkin Bout You"	Frank Ocean	
2014	**"Blurred Lines"**	**Robin Thicke (feat. T.I. and Pharrell Williams)**	
2014	"Drunk in Love"	Beyoncé (feat. Jay Z)	
2014	"Happy"	Pharrell Williams	
2014	"Hold On, We're Going Home"	Drake (feat. Majid Jordan)	
2014	"Suit & Tie"	Justin Timberlake (feat. Jay Z)	
2015	**"Happy"**	**Pharrell Williams**	
2015	"All of Me"	John Legend	
2015	"Don't Tell 'Em"	Jeremih (feat. YG)	
2015	"Loyal"	Chris Brown (feat. Lil Wayne, French Montana, Too $hort and Tyga)	
2015	"Talk Dirty"	Jason Derulo (feat. 2 Chainz)	
2016	**"The Hills"**	**The Weeknd**	
2016	"Can't Feel My Face"	The Weeknd	
2016	"Earned It (Fifty Shades of Grey)"	The Weeknd	
2016	"Here"	Alessia Cara	
2016	"Post to Be"	Omarion (feat. Chris Brown and Jhené Aiko)	
2017	**"One Dance"**	**Drake (feat. WizKid and Kyla)**	
2017	"24K Magic"	Bruno Mars	
2017	"Needed Me"	Rihanna	
2017	"Starboy"	The Weeknd (feat. Daft Punk)	
2017	"Work"	Rihanna (feat. Drake)	
2018	**"That's What I Like"**	**Bruno Mars**	
2018	"Finesse"	Bruno Mars (featuring Cardi B)	
2018	"Redbone"	Childish Gambino	
2018	"Wild Thoughts"	DJ Khaled (featuring Rihanna and Bryson Tiller)	
2018	"Young Dumb & Broke"	Khalid	
2019	**"Boo'd Up"**	**Ella Mai**	
2019	"No Brainer"	DJ Khaled (featuring Justin Bieber, Chance the Rapper & Quavo)	
2019	"Trip "	Ella Mai	
2019	"Better"	Khalid	
2019	"Freaky Friday "	Lil Dicky (featuring Chris Brown)	

=== 2020s ===
Year	Song	Artist	Ref.
2020	**"Talk"**	**Khalid**	
2020	"Juicy"	Doja Cat & Tyga	
2020	"No Guidance"	Chris Brown (featuring Drake)	
2020	"Good as Hell"	Lizzo	
2020	"Spirit "	Beyoncé	
2021	**"Blinding Lights"**	**The Weeknd**	
2021	"B.S."	Jhené Aiko (featuring H.E.R.)	
2021	"Intentions"	Justin Bieber (featuring Quavo)	
2021	"Go Crazy"	Chris Brown & Young Thug	
2021	"Say So"	Doja Cat	
2022	**"Leave the Door Open"**	**Silk Sonic**	
2022	"Peaches"	Justin Bieber (featuring Daniel Caesar & Giveon)	
2022	"You Right"	Doja Cat & The Weeknd	
2022	"Heartbreak Anniversary"	Giveon	
2022	"Essence"	Wizkid (featuring Justin Bieber & Tems)	
2023	**"Kill Bill"**	**SZA**	
2023	"Creepin'"	Metro Boomin, The Weeknd & 21 Savage	
2023	"Sure Thing"	Miguel	
2023	"Snooze"	SZA	
2023	"Die for You"	The Weeknd & Ariana Grande	
2024	**"Million Dollar Baby"**	**Tommy Richman**	
2024	"Act II: Date @ 8 (Remix)"	4Batz featuring Drake	
2024	"Made for Me"	Muni Long	
2024	"Saturn"	SZA	
2024	"Water"	Tyla	

== Multiple wins and nominations ==
=== Wins ===
2 wins

- Pharrell Williams
- The Weeknd

=== Nominations ===
8 nominations
- The Weeknd

6 nominations

- Chris Brown
- Drake

5 nominations

- Usher

4 nominations

- Justin Bieber
- Alicia Keys
- Rihanna

3 nominations

- Bruno Mars
- Doja Cat
- Jay Z
- Khalid
- Ludacris
- Miguel
- SZA
- Pharrell Williams

2 nominations

- Jhené Aiko
- Ella Mai
- Faith Evans
- Giveon
- Whitney Houston
- Jeremih
- DJ Khaled
- R. Kelly
- Lil Jon
- Lil Wayne
- Musiq
- Nicki Minaj
- Nelly
- Quavo
- Puff Daddy
- Trey Songz
- TLC
- Tyga
