= Cool Relax =

Studio album by Jon B
- Released: September 16, 1997
- Recorded: 1996–97
- Studio: Various: DARP Studios (Atlanta, Georgia); J.B.'s Spot, Toad Hall (Pasadena, California); The Record Plant, Music Grinder (Hollywood, California); Can Am Studios; Enterprise Studios; Encore Studios (Burbank, California); Chartmaker Studios (Malibu, California); Brandon's Way Recording; The Tracken Place; Larrabee Studios; Westlake Audio; Skip Saylor Recording (West Hollywood, California); Glowworm Studios (Orange, New Jersey); Sony Studios (New York City, New York)
- Length: 69:25
- Labels: Yab Yum; 550; Epic
- Producers: Keith Andes; Jon B.; David Foster; Johnny "J"; Jon-John; Tim & Bob; The Ummah

Jon B chronology
Bonafide (1995)	Cool Relax (1997)	Pleasures U Like (2001)

Singles from Cool Relax
- 1. "Don't Say" Released: August 12, 1997; 2. "Are U Still Down" Released: January 13, 1998; 3. "They Don't Know" Released: March 17, 1998; 4. "I Do (Whatcha Say Boo)" Released: September 15, 1998; 5. "Cool Relax" Released: 1998

Cool Relax is the second studio album by American singer Jon B. It was released by Tracey Edmonds' label Yab Yum Records and distributed by Epic Records subsidiary 550 Music on September 16, 1997.

== Background and recording ==
Cool Relax was the follow-up to his 1995 debut Bonafide. Jon assumed the role of having more creative control on his second album. On his debut, he was given leeway to write and produce, but Edmonds and her then-husband Babyface were heavily involved in the making of Bonafide. Jon was confident in the material for his new album, but fought with Edmonds and Babyface over certain songs to keep on the project.

Aside from his work, Jon sought outside production from Tim & Bob, Johnny J, David Foster and Ali Shaheed Muhammad of A Tribe Called Quest, among others. The song that became the first single "Don't Say", was written by former Boyz II Men and Az Yet member Marc Nelson. Jon overheard Nelson playing the song in the record company's parking lot and asked to record it for his album. The music video for the single featured a then-unknown Sanaa Lathan as the female love interest.

"They Don't Know" was released as the next single, with a music video directed by Christopher Erskin. The song's B-side "Are U Still Down" was also issued despite objections from the record company, as it featured vocals from the then-deceased Tupac Shakur who died when Jon started recording the album. Jon received assistance from Shakur's mother Afeni Shakur, who gave Jon permission to clear his vocals for the song. He would record a sequel to "Are U Still Down" called "Part 2" with a posthumous appearance by Shakur on his 2004 album Stronger Everyday.

The next single was the song "I Do (Whatcha Say Boo)". The song originally appeared on his demo tape prior to recording Bonafide- as did the album track "Can We Get Down". The final single was the title track, which had a remix that featured Guru from the hip hop group Gang Starr. The song was produced by Ali Shaheed Muhammad, who Jon sought out due to being a longtime fan of A Tribe Called Quest. "Pride & Joy" was originally recorded by Toni Braxton for her sophomore album Secrets, but the song never made the final track listing. Jon later recorded the song for himself, while giving her the song "In the Late of Night" for her album.

The last song on Cool Relax- "Tu Amor"- was penned by songwriter Diane Warren. Jon felt the song didn't fit in with the rest of the album and was done at the request of Epic Records in seeing the potential of the song becoming a huge hit. Almost a decade later, the song would be covered by Mexican pop group RBD for their English language album Rebels.

One song that didn't make the track list was "Paradise in U". A little over a decade later, he included the song on his 2008 album Helpless Romantic.

== Critical reception ==
Professional ratings
Review scores
Source	Rating
AllMusic	4/5 stars

AllMusic editor Leo Stanley wrote that while "there are a couple of mediocre songs scattered across the album, Jon B.'s second album, Cool Relax, is a step forward for the urban soul singer. For much of the time, he's able to create a seductive, sexy fusion of classic soul and rhythmic, swinging '90s hip-hop. That alone makes Cool Relax enjoyable on a surface level, but the moments that really shine are when the music, production, tunes, and songwriting all converge and result in an alluring, romantic, and bracingly modern soul. It doesn't happen all that often, but when it does, it makes the weaker moments worthwhile."

== Track listing ==
Credits adapted from liner notes and AllMusic.

Cool Relax track listing
No.	Title	Writer(s)	Producer(s)	Length
1.	"Shine"	Jonathan Buck; Dave Elias	Jon B.	4:29
2.	"Bad Girl"	Tim Kelley; Bob Robinson; Buck	Tim & Bob	4:19
3.	"Don't Say"	Jonathan Robinson; Marc Nelson; Darrell Spencer	Jon-John; Nelson	4:48
4.	"They Don't Know"	Kelley; Robinson; Buck	Tim & Bob	4:34
5.	"Can't Help It"	Buck; David Kopp; Ngai McGee	Jon B.	4:47
6.	"Cool Relax"	Buck; Dahoud Darien; Ali Shaheed Muhammad	The Ummah	4:26
7.	"Are U Still Down" (featuring 2Pac)	Buck; Tupac Shakur; Johnny Lee Jackson	2Pac; Johnny J	4:27
8.	"Pride & Joy"	Babyface	Keith Andes; Pluto	3:37
9.	"I Do (Whatcha Say Boo)"	Buck	Jon B.	4:46
10.	"Let Me Know"	Buck	Jon B.	4:51
11.	"I Ain't Going Out"	Buck	Jon B.	4:29
12.	"Let's Go (Interlude)"	Buck	Jon B.	1:29
13.	"Can We Get Down?"	Buck	Jon B.	5:24
14.	"Love Hurts"	Babyface	Jon-John	4:34
15.	"Tu Amor"	Diane Warren	David Foster	6:03
Total length:				69:25

== Personnel ==
Credits adapted from liner notes and AllMusic.

- Ali Almo – backing vocals
- Keith Andes – keyboards, producer, vocal arrangement
- Atlass – backing vocals
- Jon B. – backing vocals, producer, Vocoder, vocal arrangement, mixing
- Agnes Baddoo – stylist
- Tom Bender – mixing assistant
- Kyle Bess – mixing assistant
- Paul Boutin – engineer, mixing assistant
- Ian Boxill – engineer, mixing
- Tim Carter – hair stylist
- Greg Collins – assistant engineer, mixing assistant
- Matthew Cross – engineer
- Kevin Crouse – mixing assistant
- Dahoud Darien – keyboards, producer
- Desiree Diggs – make-up
- Sheila E. – percussion
- Nathan East – bass guitar
- Kevon Edmonds – backing vocals
- Melvin Edmonds – backing vocals
- Tracey E. Edmonds – executive producer
- Felipe Elgueta – engineer
- Dave Elias – bass guitar
- Toni Estes – backing vocals
- David Foster – keyboards, producer
- Simon Franglen – synthesizer, programming
- Roy Galloway – backing vocals
- Jon Gass – mixing
- Jeff Griffin – mixing assistant
- Reggie Griffin – bass guitar
- Gene Grimaldi – mastering
- Mick Guzauski – mixing
- Stephanie Gylden – assistant engineer
- Reggie Hamilton – guitar, bass guitar
- Jack Hersca – mixing assistant
- Zulma Iracheta – design
- Mauricio Iragorri – mixing assistant
- Eric Jackson – guitar
- Bernard Jacobs – illustrations, stylist
- Johnny J – producer
- Jon-John – keyboards, producer
- Melanie Jones – mixing assistant
- Tim Kelley – keyboards, producer, engineer, vocal arrangement, drum programming, mixing
- Khris Kellow – backing vocals
- David Kopp – guitar
- Paul Lani – engineer, mixing
- Ricco Lumpkins – assistant engineer
- Manny Marroquin – engineer, mixing
- Tony Maserati – mixing
- Michael McQuarn – executive producer
- Ali Shaheed Muhammad – producer, engineer, mixing
- Paul Naguna – assistant engineer
- Natie – rap
- Marc Nelson – backing vocals, producer
- Bennett Novak – design
- Dean Parks – acoustic guitar
- Greg Phillinganes – keyboards
- Lance Pierre – engineer
- Pluto – co-producer
- Bob Powers – engineer, mixing
- Dave Reitzas – engineer
- Michael Rich – assistant engineer, mixing assistant
- Bob Robinson – keyboards, producer, vocal arrangement
- Jason Rohrbach – assistant engineer
- Thom Russo – engineer
- Colin Sauers – engineer, assistant engineer, mixing assistant
- Michael Schlesinger – engineer
- Eddy Schreyer – mastering
- Matt Silva – assistant engineer
- Brian Smith – engineer, mixing assistant
- Alvin Speights – mixing, mixing assistant
- Jay Strauss – photography
- Michael Thompson – guitar, electric guitar
- 2Pac – producer
- The Ummah – producer
- Steve Van Arden – engineer
- Carlos Warlick – engineer

== Charts ==
=== Weekly charts ===
Weekly chart performance for Cool Relax
Chart (1997)	Peak position
US Billboard 200	33
US Top R&B/Hip-Hop Albums (Billboard)	4

=== Year-end charts ===
Year-end chart performance for Cool Relax
Chart (1998)	Position
Canadian R&B Albums (SoundScan)	78
US Billboard 200	78
US Top R&B/Hip-Hop Albums (Billboard)	14

== Certifications ==
Certifications for Cool Relax
Region	Certification	Certified units/sales
United States (RIAA)	Platinum	1,100,000
