= I Do (Whatcha Say Boo) =

Single by Jon B.

from the album Cool Relax
- Released: September 15, 1998
- Length: 4:46
- Label: Yab Yum; 550 Music
- Songwriter: Jonathan Buck
- Producer: Jon B.

Jon B. singles chronology
"They Don't Know/Are U Still Down" (1998)	"I Do (Whatcha Say Boo)" (1998)	"Cool Relax" (1998)

"I Do (Whatcha Say Boo)" is a song by American singer Jon B. Written and produced for his second studio album Cool Relax (1997), it was released by 550 Music as the album's fourth single. The song peaked at number 18 on the US Hot R&B/Hip-Hop Songs chart.

== Music video ==
A music video for "I Do (Whatcha Say Boo)" was directed by Tim Story.

== Track listings ==
CD single
No.	Title	Writer(s)	Producer(s)	Length
1.	"I Do (Whatcha Say Boo)" (Album Version)	Jonathan Buck	Jon B.	4:46
2.	"Cool Relax" (Remix)	Buck; Dahoud Darien; Ali Shaheed Muhammad; Kamaal Fareed; Ronnie Foster; Malik Taylor	The Ummah; Muhammad^{[a]}	4:48

Notes

- ^{^a} denotes additional producer

Sample credits

- "Cool Relax (Remix)" contains asample from "Electric Relaxation (Relax Yourself Girl)" as performed by A Tribe Called Quest.

== Charts ==
Weekly chart performance for "I Do (Whatcha Say Boo)"
Chart (1998)	Peak position
US Hot R&B/Hip-Hop Songs (Billboard)	18
