= Don't Talk =

Don't Talk may refer to:

== Songs ==
- "Don't Talk", 2001 song by Jon B.
- "Don't Talk (Put Your Head on My Shoulder)", 1966 song by the Beach Boys
- "Don't Talk", 1987 song by 10,000 Maniacs from In My Tribe
- "Don't Talk", 2004 song by Estelle from The 18th Day
- "Don't Talk", 2006 song by Vanessa Hudgens from V
- "Don't Talk", 2017 song by Dune Rats from The Kids Will Know It's Bullshit

== Other ==
- Don't Talk, 1942 film
