= LaNisha Cole =

American model (born 1982)

Lanisha Cole
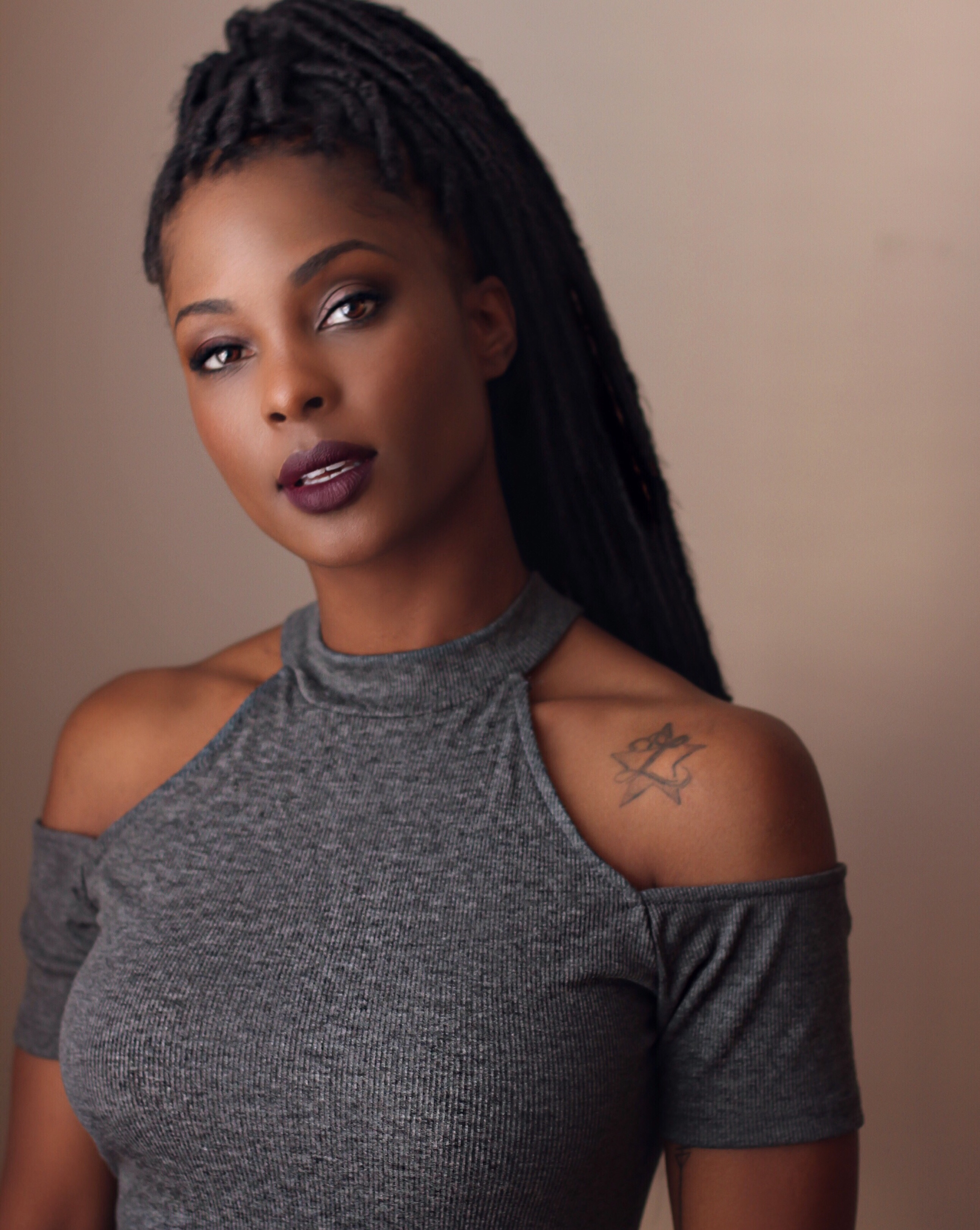
- Cole in 2017
- Born: Lanisha Diane Cole; February 13, 1982 (age 43); Pasadena, California, U.S.
- Occupation(s): Model, actress
- Years active: 2003–present
- Known for: The Price Is Right
- Children: 1
- Website: lanishacole.com

Lanisha Diane Cole (or LaNisha Cole; born February 13, 1982) is an American model best known for her eight seasons (2003–2010) as a rotating model on the daily game show The Price Is Right in both the Bob Barker and Drew Carey eras. She was the face of Milani/Jordana Cosmetics for 9+ years and had a role in the movies Soul Plane and A Beautiful Soul. After The Price Is Right, Cole joined the cast of the television series Fact or Faked: Paranormal Files. Cole opened an art gallery in Santa Monica at Bergamot Station in January 2011 and photography studio Studio 401 LA in Downtown Los Angeles' art district in 2013 where she is owner-photographer.

== Career ==
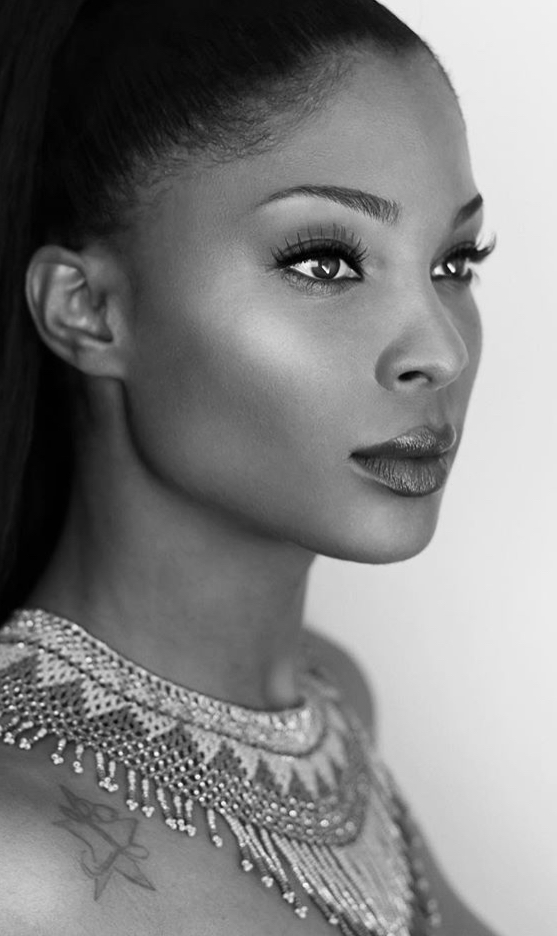
Cole wearing a Panamanian beaded collar

Cole was a model on the NBC primetime game show Deal or No Deal, holding case #15. She left during its second season but returned during the third season as a substitute at cases #2, 4, 6, 10, and 16. She appeared in music videos, including Jon B's 2001 video for "Don't Talk", The Roots' "Break You Off", Pharrell's "Frontin'", N*E*R*D's "Maybe", Eric Benet's "Never Want to Live Without You". Cole appeared in the Cîroc ad campaign for "Step Into The Circle" with Sean Combs and rapper French Montana.

== Personal life ==
In 2011, Cole filed a lawsuit claiming she was sexually harassed by two producers for The Price Is Right game show: Michael G. Richards and Adam Sandler (not the actor and comedian Adam Sandler).

Cole's daughter Onyx Ice Cole Cannon, whose father is actor Nick Cannon, was born on September 14, 2022.
