= Bonafide (Jon B. album) =

Studio album by Jon B.
- Released: May 23, 1995
- Recorded: May 1994–April 1995
- Studios: The TracKen Place; Cherokee Studios (Los Angeles, California); The Music Grinder (Hollywood, California)
- Length: 66:20
- Labels: Yab Yum; 550 Music; Epic
- Producers: Jon B.; Babyface

Jon B. chronology
Bonafide (1995)	Cool Relax (1997)

Alternative cover
- UK-release cover

Bonafide is the debut studio album by American singer Jon B. It was released on May 23, 1995, on the Epic Records subsidiary 550 Music. The album was the first recording released on Tracey Edmonds' record label Yab Yum Records, which 550 Music distributed.

It includes the Grammy-nominated first single "Someone to Love" featuring Babyface. The song was originally featured on the soundtrack to the 1995 Will Smith and Martin Lawrence action-comedy Bad Boys. Also included is the second single "Pretty Girl" and the final single "Isn't It Scary".

== Critical reception ==
Professional ratings
Review scores
Source	Rating
AllMusic	3/5 stars

AllMusic described the songs on the album as "sweetly-sung paeans to the late-night nasties, pure acts of musical seduction [...] Bonafide is a mix of dance tunes, and ballads with slinky beats and shadowy moods that suggest late nights in a jazz or blues club. This is the red-light district of sweet-soul music [...] The sound of Bonafide is seductive enough, but Jon B.'s sexiest tool is his voice, which has the slurred quality of bedroom talk and still manages to swoop gracefully over melodic choruses."

Bonafide was a favorite of rapper Tupac Shakur. The two met each other by way of a mutual friend on the set of Shakur's video "How Do U Want It", which prompted them to work together. The end result was the collaboration "Are U Still Down", which appeared on Jon's following album Cool Relax.

== Chart performance ==
Bonafide peaked at number 79 on the US Billboard 200. By July 1995, the album had sold 58,000 units. On August 1, 1996, it was certified Gold by the Recording Industry Association of America (RIAA) for shipments figures in excess of 500,000 copies.

== Track listing ==
Bonafide track listing
No.	Title	Writer(s)	Producer(s)	Length
1.	"Bonafide"	Jonathan Buck	Jon B.	4:26
2.	"Simple Melody" (featuring Bootsy Collins)	Buck; William Collins	Jon B.	3:58
3.	"Love Is Candi"	Buck	Jon B.	4:40
4.	"Mystery 4 Two"	Buck	Jon B.	4:58
5.	"Someone to Love" (featuring Babyface)	Kenneth Edmonds	Babyface	4:35
6.	"Time After Time"	Buck	Jon B.	5:47
7.	"Overflow"	Buck	Jon B.	5:00
8.	"Pretty Girl"	Edmonds	Babyface	4:18
9.	"Pants Off"	Buck	Jon B.	4:38
10.	"Isn't It Scary"	Buck	Jon B.	5:08
11.	"Burning 4 You"	Buck	Jon B.	5:52
12.	"Gone Before Light"	Buck	Jon B.	6:15
13.	"Love Don't Do"	Buck	Jon B.	6:45
Total length:				66:20

Sample credits

- "Simple Melody" contains a sample from "(Not Just) Knee Deep" as performed by George Clinton

== Personnel ==
Credits adapted from liner notes and CD Universe.

- Jon B. – lead and backing vocals, drums, drum programming, piano, keyboards, bass
- Babyface – backing vocals, drum programming, keyboards, guitar
- Deon Estus – bass
- Reggie Hamilton – guitar
- Ricardo Silveria – guitar
- Musiic K. Galloway – backing vocals
- Deborah Buck, Donald Buck, Kevin Buck – strings
- Tyrone Griffin – trumpet
- Randy Walker – MIDI programming
- Tracey Edmonds, Michael McQuarn – executive producer
- Brad Gilderman, Marty Ogden, Ricky Delena – recording engineer
- Dave Way, Tom Russo, Jon Gass, Mick Guzauski – mixing
- Herb Powers, Jr. – mastering
- George Holz – photography

== Charts ==
=== Weekly charts ===
Weekly chart performance for Bonafide
Chart (1995)	Peak position
Singapore Albums (SPVA)	7
US Billboard 200	79
US Top R&B/Hip-Hop Albums (Billboard)	24

=== Year-end charts ===
Year-end chart performance for Bonafide
Chart (1995)	Position
US Top R&B/Hip-Hop Albums (Billboard)	97

== Certifications ==
Certifications for Bonafide
Region	Certification	Certified units/sales
United States (RIAA)	Gold	371,000
