= Helpless Romantic =

Studio album by Jon B
- Released: October 28, 2008
- Length: 57:15
- Label: Arsenal
- Producers: Jon B.; Joaquin Bynum; Emile Ghantous; Tim Kobza; Mr. Lee

Jon B chronology
Holiday Wishes: From Me to You (2006)	Helpless Romantic (2008)	Comfortable Swagg (2012)

Singles from Helpless Romantic
- 1. "Ooh So Sexy" Released: 2008

Helpless Romantic is the sixth studio album by American Jon B. It was released on October 28, 2008, through Arsenal Records, marking his second and final album for the independent record label, following the Christmas album Holiday Wishes: From Me to You in 2006. Helpless Romantic was a concept album that revolved around his recent marriage to his new wife. It was recorded at Vibezelect Studios in Pasadena, California, Jon B.'s personal recording studio/record label.

== Critical reception ==
Professional ratings
Review scores
Source	Rating
AllMusic	1.5/5 stars

AllHipHop found that Helpless Romantic "proves that [Jon B.'s] still most definitely got it. While not quite on the level of his breakthrough sophomore offering (Cool Relax) or as upbeat and commercially flexible as his 2004's Stronger Everyday, it's still light years ahead of most of the recent competition." He concluded: "It's hard not to love Jon B.'s ability to run with a mid-tempo record, but Helpless Romantic comes slightly undone due to its final eight songs being a little too slow. They're constructed very solidly, but there is such thing as too much of a good thing."

In a negative review, AllMusic editor Thomas Inskeep wrote that Helpless Romantic "only testifies to the fact that he's run stone out of ideas, or anything else remotely interesting to say [...] The production is utterly adult-R&B-cliched throughout (i.e. gently bumping grooves that go nowhere, so as to not offend) [...] This is dull R&B, mediocre at best, and truly bad at worst – and the real worst is that it comes from an artist who should know better; did his tutelage at the feet of Babyface teach him nothing? Apparently not."

== Chart performance ==
Helpless Romantic debuted and peaked at number 109 on the US Billboard 200 chart, while also reaching number 11 on the Top R&B/Hip-Hop Albums chart, becoming Jon B.'s highest-charting album since Pleasures U Like (2001).

== Track listing ==
Helpless Romantic track listing
No.	Title	Writer(s)	Producer(s)	Length
1.	"Ooh So Sexy" (featuring Paul Wall)	Jonathan Buck; Mr. Lee; Kevin Buck; Derek "Sincere" Pomier	Jon B.; Mr. Lee	4:31
2.	"It's U"	J. Buck; Joaquin Bynum	Jon B.; Bynum; Jim Jonsin^{[a]}	3:33
3.	"Get What You Want"	J. Buck	Jon B.	4:26
4.	"Helpless Romantic Interlude"	J. Buck; Danette Buck	Jon B.	0:32
5.	"Helpless Romantic"	J. Buck; Bynum	Jon B.	3:46
6.	"Paradise in U"	J. Buck	Jon B.	5:44
7.	"Drops of Rain"	J. Buck	Jon B.	3:31
8.	"Need it Badd"	J. Buck	Jon B.	3:32
9.	"On & On"	Emile Ghantous; Erik Nelson; J. Buck; D. Simmons; L. Harris	Ghantous	3:56
10.	"Everybody Here Wants You"	Jeff Buckley	Jon B.	4:44
11.	"Ride of Our Lives" (featuring Jonesii)	J. Buck; Denaine Jones	Jon B.	5:06
12.	"Won't You Say Yeah"	J. Buck; Bynum	Jon B.; Bynum	3:45
13.	"Part of U"	J. Buck; Tim Kobza	Jon B.; Kobza	3:40
14.	"In Too Deep"	Buck; Holliwood	Jon B.	6:29
Total length:				57:15

Notes

- ^{^[a]} signifies a co-producer

== Personnel ==
Musicians

- Jon B. – background vocals, drum programming, keyboards, live Drums
- Kevin Buck – bass
- Joaquin Bynum – background vocals, drum programming, keyboards
- Cornet Tyrone Griffen – trumpet
- D-Mak – bass
- Insomniax – background vocals, drum programming, keyboards
- Jonesii – background vocals
- Tim Kobza – bass, guitar
- Mr. Lee – drum programming, keyboards

Technical

- Airphilosophy.com – Art direction, design
- Jon B. – executive producer, mixing
- Jim Caruana – mixing
- KD – mixing
- Max Gousse – executive producer
- Jim Jonsin– mixing
- Stephen Marsh – mastering engineer
- Kawai Matthews – photography
- Dan Naim – mixing
- Ozz Saturne – executive producer

== Charts ==
Chart performance for Helpless Romantic
Chart (2008)	Peak position
US Billboard 200	109
US Top R&B/Hip-Hop Albums (Billboard)	11

== Release history ==
Release dates and formats for Helpless Romantic
Region	Date	Format(s)	Label	Ref.
United States	October 28, 2008	CD; digital download	Arsenal Records	
