= Don't Say (Jon B. song) =

Single by Jon B.

from the album Cool Relax
- B-side: "Let U Shine"
- Released: August 12, 1997
- Length: 4:53 (album version); 4:03 (radio edit)
- Label: Yab Yum; 550 Music
- Songwriters: Darrell Spencer; Jon-John Robinson; Marc Nelson
- Producers: Jon-John Robinson; Marc Nelson

Jon B. singles chronology
"Isn't It Scary" (1996)	"Don't Say" (1997)	"They Don't Know/Are U Still Down" (1998)

Music video
- "Don't Say" on YouTube

"Don't Say" is a song performed by American singer Jon B. It was written by Darrell Spencer, Jon-John Robinson, and Marc Nelson for his second studio album Cool Relax (1997), while production was helmed by Robinson and Nelson. Issued as the album's lead single, the song peaked at number 68 on the US Billboard Hot 100 and number 29 on the US Rhythmic chart.

== Background ==
"Don't Say" was written by Marc Nelson of Az Yet. Jon B. heard it playing while the two were hanging out in the parking lot of the Edmonds' record company, asked who had written it, and told Nelson he wanted to record it for his album, something he said he had never done before. He said the song's "bluesy and church vibe" caught his attention and that it almost reminded him of a Kenny Loggins-type song.

As the album's first single, "Don't Say" had what SoulCulture called "a lukewarm reception" on the charts; according to the magazine, Jon B. was not concerned, as he expected the next two singles, "They Don't Know" and "Are U Still Down", to change the direction of the project.

== Critical reception ==
Billboard editor Larry Flick called the song a "smooth jeep slow jam [...] "Don’t Say" has alaid-back sing-along chorus that firmly supports Jon's fluid vocal. Kids will also dig the quietly bumpin’ beat, which deftly straddles the line between pop accessibility and street purity."

== Music video ==
The official music video for "Don't Say" was directed by Kevin Bray and features Sanaa Lathan as Jon B.'s love interest.

== Track listings ==
CD single
No.	Title	Writer(s)	Producer(s)	Length
1.	"Don't Say" (Radio Edit)	Jonathan Robinson; Marc Nelson; Darrell Spencer	Jon-John; Nelson	4:03
2.	"Don't Say" (Love Hangover Remix Edit)	Robinson; Nelson; Spencer	Jon-John; Nelson; Bilal Bashir^{[a]}; Mark Lomax^{[a]}	4:48

CD maxi single
No.	Title	Writer(s)	Producer(s)	Length
1.	"Don't Say" (Radio Edit)	Robinson; Nelson; Spencer	Jon-John; Nelson	4:49
2.	"Don't Say" (Instrumental)	Robinson; Nelson; Spencer	Jon-John; Nelson	4:53
3.	"Let U Shine"	Jonathan Buck; D. Elias	Jon B.	4:29

Notes

- ^{^a} denotes additional producer

Sample credits

- "Don't Say (Love Hangover Remix Edit)" contains a sample of "Love Hangover" as performed by Diana Ross.

== Charts ==
Weekly chart performance for "Don't Say"
Chart (1997)	Peak position
US Billboard Hot 100	68
US Hot R&B/Hip-Hop Songs (Billboard)	34
US Rhythmic Airplay (Billboard)	29
