= Don't Talk (Jon B. song) =

Single by Jon B.

from the album Pleasures U Like
- Released: March 13, 2001
- Length: 4:44 (album version); 4:12 (single edit)
- Label: Edmonds Record Group; Epic
- Songwriter: Jon B.
- Producer: Jon B.

Jon B. singles chronology
"Cool Relax" (1998)	"Don't Talk" (2001)	"Everytime" (2005)

Music video
- "Don't Talk" on YouTube

"Don't Talk" is a song written, produced and performed by American contemporary R&B singer Jon B. It was issued as the first and only official single from his third studio album Pleasures U Like (2001). The song peaked at number 58 on the US Billboard Hot 100 in 2001.

== Background ==
"Don't Talk" was written and produced by Jon B. Conceived in his new recording studio following a fire in his previous facilities, the song was produced late into the production of the Pleasures U Like album. Jon B. called the song a "last minute banger."

== Critical reception ==
Chuck Taylor from Billboard compared the song to Lucy Pearl's "Dance Tonight" (2000) and described "Don't Talk" as "one of those feel-good grooves. From the first few notes, the smoothed-out track and cool lyric put you in the mood to get up and dance, no matter where you are — in the office or car or at a club or your neighbourhood hangout [...] It's all fun — and we could all use some sunny summertime sounds to lighten up the gray winter music blahs." NME wrote: "Bass-heavy from the start, "Don't Talk" quickly builds up into a tidy club jam, with pretty-as-a-daisy instrumental touches. Ever the ladykiller, Jon keeps his vocals on a softly-softly keel, which diverts attention to the groove and the gorgeous melodies elicited from his backing singers [...] It's a redeeming slice of soulful R&B (you know what I mean) for the guy with a ballad compulsion."

== Music video ==
The official music video for the song was directed by Marcus Raboy. American model Lanisha Cole appears as an extra in the video. It features Jon B. dancing with several women and meeting friends in different sets such as a nightclub or on a rooftop with skyscrapers in the background. Cole plays his romantic interest, dancing seductively next to him and sitting on his lap by the end of the video.

== Track listings ==
All tracks written by Jon B.

Maxi single
No.	Title	Producer(s)	Length
1.	"Don't Talk" (radio version)	Jon B.	4:12
2.	"Don't Talk" (Shelter Late Night Vocal)	Jon B.; Blaze^{[a]}	9:16
3.	"Don't Talk" (Lawless remix) (featuring Lawless)	Jon B.; Lawless^{[a]}	4:40
4.	"Don't Talk" (Lawless hip hop Remix) (featuring Lawless)	Jon B.; Lawless^{[a]}	4:28

Notes

- ^{^[a]} denotes vocal producer

== Credits and personnel ==
- Jon B. – all music, recording engineer, producer, writer
- Marcus Best – production coordination
- Dave Guerrero – mixing assistance
- Dave Pensado – mixing engineer

== Charts ==
=== Weekly charts ===
Weekly chart performance for "Don't Talk"
Chart (2001)	Peak position
UK Singles (Official Charts)	29
UK Dance (Official Charts)	17
UK Hip Hop/R&B (Official Charts)	8
US Billboard Hot 100	58
US Hot R&B/Hip-Hop Songs (Billboard)	21
US Rhythmic Airplay (Billboard)	20

=== Year-end charts ===
Year-end chart performance for "Don't Talk"
Chart (2001)	Position
UK Urban (Music Week)	4
US Hot R&B/Hip-Hop Songs (Billboard)	84
