= Herb Trawick (music executive) =

Music executive and producer (1956–2026)

- Born: April 7, 1956; Montreal, Quebec, Canada
- Died: February 22, 2026 (aged 69); Calabasas, California, U.S.
- Education: Eastern Kentucky University
- Occupations: Music executive, artist manager, producer
- Known for: Pensado's Place
- Father: Herb Trawick

Herb Trawick (April 7, 1956 – February 22, 2026) was a music executive, artist manager and producer. He managed singer Brian McKnight, worked in promotion and artists and repertoire at SOLAR Records, and was a partner of Maurice White in Kalimba Entertainment. He later created and co-hosted the music-production series Pensado's Place with mixing engineer Dave Pensado.

Trawick was a producer of the Broadway musical Hot Feet, which used the music of Earth, Wind & Fire. In 2020, he and Pensado were inducted into the TEC Hall of Fame.

== Early life and education ==
Trawick was born in Montreal, Quebec, on April 7, 1956, to Jean Trawick and professional football player Herb Trawick. His father played for the Montreal Alouettes and was inducted into the Canadian Football Hall of Fame in 1975.

The family moved to Ashland, Kentucky, in 1965. Trawick attended Paul G. Blazer High School and graduated from Eastern Kentucky University in 1977 with a degree in communications.

== Career ==
=== Record industry and artist management ===
Trawick moved to Los Angeles in the late 1970s. He later worked in promotion and A&R at SOLAR Records.

By the 1990s, Trawick headed the Trawick Company and managed Brian McKnight. In 1999, Trawick managed McKnight and helped direct McKnight's career as the singer's commercial success increased. Trawick was also credited as an executive producer on McKnight's albums, including Bethlehem and Superhero.

=== Kalimba Entertainment and Maurice White ===
Trawick became a partner of Maurice White in Kalimba Entertainment in 2003. In 2004, Kalimba was handling White's activities outside Earth, Wind & Fire and he was White's business partner and McKnight's former manager.

Trawick and White developed projects using the Earth, Wind & Fire catalog. Trawick was White's partner in Kalimba Entertainment while White was developing new interpretations of his songs.

Trawick was a producer of Hot Feet, a musical conceived around songs written or recorded by Earth, Wind & Fire. The production had a pre-Broadway engagement in Washington, D.C., before opening at the Hilton Theatre on Broadway in 2006. Trawick later worked as an advisor to Primary Wave.

=== Pensado's Place ===
Trawick managed mixing engineer Dave Pensado, with whom he developed Pensado's Place, an online program about recording, mixing and music production. The program began in 2010, with Trawick as co-host and executive producer.

The series features interviews and discussions with recording engineers, producers, mixers and other music professionals. Trawick and Pensado also developed the Pensado Awards, which recognize work in recording, mixing and music production. Trawick and Pensado co-authored The Pensado Papers, published by Hal Leonard in 2014. In January 2020, Trawick and Pensado were inducted into the TEC Hall of Fame for their work with Pensado's Place.

== Awards and other activities ==
In 2016, Trawick received the Creative Visionary Award from the Living Legends Foundation. The award was presented at the foundation's 25th Anniversary Awards Show and Dinner on October 6, 2016, in Los Angeles.

Trawick served in advisory and educational roles with music-industry organizations and programs, including the Abbey Road Institute, 1500 Sound Academy, the Blackbird Academy and Musicians Institute. In 2023, he joined the board of directors of the Guitar Center Music Foundation.

== Personal life and death ==
Trawick's father, Herb Trawick, played professional football for the Montreal Alouettes and was a member of the Canadian Football Hall of Fame. Trawick died at his home in Calabasas, California, on February 22, 2026, at the age of 69.
