= Velvet Crush =

American music band

- Origin: Providence, Rhode Island, United States
- Genre: Power pop
- Years active: 1989–2004, 2019–present
- Labels: Creation, Epic, Action Musik, Bobsled, 550 Music
- Spinoff of: Choo Choo Train; Bag-O-Shells; The Springfields
- Members: Paul Chastain; Ric Menck; Jeffrey Underhill; Jason Victor
- Past members: Peter Phillips

Velvet Crush is an American power pop band from Providence, Rhode Island, United States, that achieved prominence in indie-rock circles in the 1990s. Vocalist/bassist Paul Chastain and drummer Ric Menck are the band's core members, having previously worked together as Choo Choo Train, Bag-O-Shells, and The Springfields, and they share singing and songwriting duties. Guitarist Jeffrey Underhill (of Honeybunch) played on the band's first three albums: In the Presence of Greatness (1991), Teenage Symphonies to God (1994), and Heavy Changes (1998). The lineup became a quartet when Peter Phillips (of Six Finger Satellite) joined as second guitarist for Heavy Changes. Both Underhill and Phillips left the band afterwards, although the latter appeared on the demo tracks for Free Expression (1999). After the releases of Soft Sounds (2002) and Stereo Blues (2004), the band went on a semi-hiatus. They reformed in 2019, although the band focused on live shows and reissues from that point on. In the Presence of Greatness was produced by Matthew Sweet, while the second and third albums were produced by Mitch Easter.

== History ==
Chastain had recorded in the mid-1980s as a solo artist and as a member of Nines and The Stupid Cupids, while Menck had been a member of The Reverbs and The Paint Set. The long association between Chastain and Menck began in 1987 with the indie pop band Choo Choo Train, who released two singles and an EP and were signed to the British indie label The Subway Organization. The duo also recorded for Sarah Records as The Springfields, and for Bus Stop as Bag-O-Shells. Both had been based in Chicago, but they relocated to Rhode Island around this time. Opting for a more rock-oriented power pop sound, the duo formed Velvet Crush in 1989, with Jeffrey Borchardt (AKA Underhill) of Honeybunch. After three singles on Bus Stop Records, the band released a cover version of Teenage Fanclub's "Everything Flows", as an extra track on the CD Single of 'Ash & Earth, on Seminal Twang, run by David Barker of Glass Records, who was in charge of the Paperhouse label for Fire Records at this time. Paperhouse were keen to release the first Velvet Crush LP, but they chose to sign to Creation Records in the UK, who issued the band's debut album, In the Presence of Greatness, in 1991. The band stayed with Creation for a second album, Teenage Symphonies to God, released in 1994 (on Sony Records in the US). The group members spent the next few years acting as Stephen Duffy's backing band, recording two albums with the singer. Velvet Crush returned in 1998 with the Heavy Changes album, now on the Action Musik label. Another album, Free Expression, followed in 1999, by which time the band was reduced to a duo of Chastain and Menck. Soft Sounds followed in 2002, and Stereo Blues in 2004.

In 2015, David Barker revived his Glass Records label, and reissued In the Presence of Greatness on vinyl in October 2018 on the Glass Modern imprint. In July 2019, Menck and Chastain reunited with Underhill and added Jason Victor on lead guitar for a mini-reunion tour of New England.

== Members ==
=== Current ===
- Paul Chastain – vocals, bass (1989–2004, 2019–present)
- Ric Menck – drums, vocals (1989–2004, 2019–present)
- Jeffrey Underhill – guitars (1989–1998, 2019–present)
- Jason Victor – guitars (2019–present)

=== Former ===
- Peter Phillips – guitars (1996–1999); died 2015

== Discography ==
=== Velvet Crush ===
==== Albums ====
- In the Presence of Greatness (1991) Creation/Ringers Lactate
- Teenage Symphonies to God (1994) Creation/Sony
- Heavy Changes (1998) Action Musik
- Free Expression (1999) Bobsled
- Soft Sounds (2002) Action Musik
- Stereo Blues (2004)

===== Compilations and live albums =====
- Rock Concert (2000) Action Musik
- A Single Odessey (2001) Action Musik
- Timeless Melodies (2001) Epic
- Melody Freaks (demos & outtakes 1990-1996) (2002) Action Musik

==== Singles ====
- "If Not True" (1990) Bus Stop
- "Walking Out on Love" (1990) Raving Pop Blast (split flexi disc with The Golden Dawn)
- "Ash & Earth" (1991) Seminal Twang (UK) (includes Everything Flows on the CD version)
- "Ash & Earth" (1991) Bus Stop (US)
- "Window to the World" (1992) Creation
- The Post Greatness EP (1992) Creation
- "Drive Me Down" (1992) Creation
- "Remember the Lightning" (1994) The Bob magazine (split flexi disc with Guided by Voices)
- "Hold Me Up" (1994) Parasol
- "Hold Me Up" (1994) Creation
- "Why Not Your Baby" (1995) Creation
- "Gentle Breeze" (2000) Bobsled

=== Choo Choo Train ===
==== Singles ====
- "This Perfect Day" (1987) Picture Book
- The Briar Rose EP (1988) The Subway Organization
- "High" single 7" (1989) The Subway Organization
- "High" EP 12" (1989) The Subway Organization

==== Compilation Album ====
- Briar High (The 1988 Singles) (1992) The Subway Organization

=== The Springfields ===
==== Singles ====
- "Sunflower" (1988) Sarah (UK indie No. 8)
- "Tomorrow Ends Today" (1991) Picture Book
- "Wonder" (1991) Sarah
- "Tranquil" (1991) Seminal Twang/Summershine

=== Bag-O-Shells ===
==== Singles ====
- "Markers" (1988 - 7" - Bus Stop)
- "Pocket Book" (1990 - 7" - Bus Stop)

=== Paul Chastain & Ric Menck ===
==== Compilations ====
- Hey Wimpus: The Early Recordings of Paul Chastain & Ric Menck (1998) Action Musik
