= Pretty Girl (Jon B. song) =

Single by Jon B.

from the album Bonafide
- Released: August 15, 1995
- Recorded: 1994
- Genre: R&B; blue-eyed soul
- Length: 4:18
- Label: Yab Yum; 550 Music
- Songwriter: Kenneth "Babyface" Edmonds
- Producer: Kenneth "Babyface" Edmonds

Jon B. singles chronology
"Someone to Love" (1995)	"Pretty Girl" (1995)	"Isn't It Scary" (1996)

Music video
- "Pretty Girl" on YouTube

"Pretty Girl" is a song performed by American contemporary R&B singer Jon B, issued in August 1995 by labels Yab Yum and 550 Music, as the second single from his debut studio album, Bonafide (1995). The song, written and produced by Babyface, peaked at numbers 18 and 25 on the US Cash Box Top 100 and Billboard Hot 100 charts. The accompanying music video was directed by American director F. Gary Gray.

== Personnel and credits ==
Credits adapted from album liner notes.

- Jon B. - lead vocals, background vocals
- Babyface - writer, producer, arranger, background vocals, keyboard, drum programming, midi programming
- Brad Gilderman - recording engineer
- Marty Ogden – recording engineer
- Mick Guzauski - mix engineer

== Charts ==
Chart (1995)	Peak position
Europe (European Dance Radio)	21
US Billboard Hot 100	25
US Hot R&B/Hip-Hop Singles & Tracks (Billboard)	21
US Rhythmic Top 40 (Billboard)	9
US Top 40 Mainstream (Billboard)	29
US Cash Box Top 100	18
