= Teenage Symphonies to God =

Studio album by Velvet Crush
- Released: July 5, 1994
- Studios: The Drive-In (Winston-Salem); Reflection Sound (Charlotte); Overdub Lane (Durham)
- Genre: Power pop
- Length: 45:49
- Label: 550 Music/Epic
- Producers: Mitch Easter, Velvet Crush

Velvet Crush chronology
The Post-Greatness EP (1992)	Teenage Symphonies to God (1994)	Heavy Changes (1998)

Teenage Symphonies to God is the second album by the American band Velvet Crush, released in 1994. The title of the album is a reference to Brian Wilson's description of the music he was creating for Smile. Teenage Symphonies to God had sold around 20,000 copies by the end of the 1990s.

The band supported the album by opening for the Jesus and Mary Chain and Mazzy Star on a North American tour.

== Production ==
"Why Not Your Baby" was written by Gene Clark; "Something's Gotta Give" is a cover of the Matthew Sweet song. The album was produced by Mitch Easter and the band. Recorded in Winston-Salem, the album's original songs were written by the three band members; some work was also done at Charlotte's Reflection Studios. Greg Leisz contributed pedal steel to a few songs.

The cover artwork is an homage to Frank Holmes's work on Smile.

== Critical reception ==
Professional ratings
Review scores
Source	Rating
AllMusic	4.5/5 stars
Calgary Herald	B+
The Charlotte Observer	3.5/4 stars
Chicago Tribune	3.5/4 stars
Deseret News	3.5/4 stars
The Encyclopedia of Popular Music	4/5 stars
MusicHound Rock: The Essential Album Guide	5/5 stars
Rolling Stone	3/5 stars
San Antonio Express-News	3.5/4 stars
The Tampa Tribune	2.5/4 stars

The Washington Post thought that the music "is rooted in the ambitious pop-rock of the bands such as Yardbirds and the Byrds ... but most closely resembles the eclectic '60s-rock revivalism of '80s groups like Game Theory." Trouser Press wrote that the "tone is warmer, more intimate... Lyrics face difficulties with equal parts compassion and confusion—and little emotional success." The Chicago Tribune considered that, "unlike other Radio City admirers, the Velvet Crush not only rocks the melodies and draws blood on the ballads, but gets at the underlying sadness that permeated Big Star's tunes."

Rolling Stone opined that, "while Velvet Crush have no problems crafting such catchy major-key, tambourine-shaking testaments to heartfelt longing as 'Hold Me Up', the group ultimately suffers from sonic myopia." Stereo Review called the album "top-to-bottom great," writing that, "if there's symphonic grandeur here, it's more implied than elaborated on, but it can be divined in touches like the mesmerizing riff and circular, overlapping vocals that float through the unforgettably lovely 'Time Wraps Around You'." The Telegram & Gazette noted that the album "delicately balances the band's songwriting craftsmanship and the inherent throw-away nature of pop music, harkening back to a time when the picture of screaming teens attending a Rolling Stones concert was almost as powerful as the music itself."

AllMusic wrote that "Velvet Crush manage to inject a real enthusiasm and freshness in the standard three-minute pop song." MusicHound Rock: The Essential Album Guide deemed the album "a compelling and important work that deserves attention."

== Track listing ==
All tracks are written by Paul Chastain, Jeffrey Borchardt, and Ric Menck except where noted.

No.	Title	Writer(s)	Length
1.	"Hold Me Up"		3:00
2.	"My Blank Pages"		3:29
3.	"Why Not Your Baby"	Gene Clark	4:50
4.	"Time Wraps Around You"		4:13
5.	"Atmosphere"		3:53
6.	"#10"		2:24
7.	"Faster Days"	Chastain, Borchardt, Menck, Stephen Duffy	4:38
8.	"Something's Gotta Give"	Matthew Sweet	5:52
9.	"This Life Is Killing Me"		2:51
10.	"Weird Summer"		3:52
11.	"Star Trip"		3:54
12.	"Keep On Lingerin'"		2:53
Total length:			45:49

== Personnel ==
Velvet Crush

- Jeffrey Borchardt – guitar
- Paul Chastain – bass, vocals
- Ric Menck – drums

Additional musicians

- Mitch Easter – lead guitar
- Stephen Duffy – performer
- Greg Leisz – pedal steel guitar
- Mike Denneen – Chamberlin
- Wes Lachot – performer
- Lynn Blakely – performer
- John Chumbris – performer

Production

- Mitch Easter – producing, recording, mixing
- Velvet Crush – producing
- Lloyd Puckitt – additional engineering
- Tracey Shroeder – engineering assistant
- Scott Litt – mixing on "Hold Me Up", "My Blank Pages", and "Time Wraps Around You"
- John Paterno – mixing assistant on "Hold Me Up", "My Blank Pages", and "Time Wraps Around You"
- Greg Calbi – mastering
- Edwin Fotheringham – cover illustration
- Robert Fraser – photography
- Francesca Restrepo – art direction, design
