= They Don't Know (Jon B. song) =

Single by Jon B.

from the album Cool Relax
- B-side: "Are U Still Down"
- Released: March 17, 1998
- Genre: R&B
- Length: 4:34
- Label: Yab Yum; 550 Music
- Songwriters: Tim Kelley; Bob Robinson; Jon B.
- Producers: Tim Kelley; Bob Robinson

Jon B. singles chronology
"Don't Say" (1997)	"They Don't Know" (1998)	"I Do (Whatcha Say Boo)" (1998)

Music video
- "They Don't Know" on YouTube

"They Don't Know" is a song produced by American singer Jon B. Co-written by and produced by Tim Kelley and Bob Robinson under their production moniker Tim & Bob for his second studio album Cool Relax (1997), it was issued as the album's third single in 1998. The song became Jon B.'s highest-charting single since "Someone to Love" (1995), reaching number seven on the US Billboard Hot 100.

== Release ==
The radio edit version and its remix sampled "Ten Crack Commandments" and "The World is Filled," both performed by The Notorious B.I.G. The song became Jon B.'s biggest hit to date on the US Billboard Hot 100, peaking at number seven in 1998.

== Music video ==
A music video for "They Don't Know" was directed by Christopher Erskin.

== Cover versions ==
Gunna and Chlöe came together to write the song "You & Me" which sampled some lyrics and the guitar from "They Don't Know". During an appearance on the podcast Can We Talk RNB?, Jon B. expressed his distaste towards Gunna for sampling his song without his consent.

== Track listings ==
CD single
No.	Title	Writer(s)	Producer(s)	Length
1.	"They Don't Know" (Radio Edit)	Jonathan Buck; Tim Kelley; Bob Robinson	Tim & Bob	4:11
2.	"They Don't Know" (Club Mix)	Buck; Kelley; Robinson	Tim & Bob	6:02
3.	"They Don't Know" (Album Version)	Buck; Kelley; Robinson	Tim & Bob	4:34
4.	"Are U Still Down" (featuring 2Pac)	Buck; Tupac Shakur; Johnny Lee Jackson	2Pac; Johnny "J"	4:27

Remix single
No.	Title	Writer(s)	Producer(s)	Length
1.	"They Don't Know" (Soulshock & Karlin Remix Club Mix)	Buck; Kelley; Robinson	Tim & Bob; Soulshock & Karlin^{[a]}	6:03
2.	"They Don't Know" (Bugati Chill Mix)	Buck; Kelley; Robinson	Tim & Bob; Jon B.^{[a]}	4:26
3.	"They Don't Know" (Album Version)	Buck; Kelley; Robinson	Tim & Bob	4:33

Notes

- ^{^a} denotes additional producer

== Charts ==
=== Weekly charts ===
Weekly chart performance for "They Don't Know"
Chart (1998)	Peak position
UK Singles (OCC)	32
US Billboard Hot 100	7
US Hot R&B/Hip-Hop Songs (Billboard)	2
US Rhythmic Airplay (Billboard)	11

=== Year-end charts ===
Year-end Chart performance of "They Don't Know"
Chart (1998)	Position
US Billboard Hot 100	39
US Hot R&B/Hip-Hop Songs (Billboard)	2

== Certifications ==
Certifications for "They Don't Know"
Region	Certification	Certified units/sales
United States (RIAA)	Platinum	1,000,000
