= Polly Anthony =

American music industry executive (1953–2013)

- Born: Mary Kathryn Anthony; November 15, 1952; Alexandria, Virginia
- Died: September 29, 2013 (aged 59)
- Occupation: Record industry executive
- Years active: 1978-2013

Mary Kathryn "Polly" Anthony (1953–2013) was an American music industry executive. One of the first women to head a major record label, she was the president of Epic Records from 1997 until 2003.

== Early life ==
Anthony was born in Alexandria, Virginia to Patrice H. and Bernard J. Anthony, an aerospace executive. She and her family moved to Palos Verdes Peninsula in Southern California in 1963. In 1965, she saw The Beatles at the Hollywood Bowl, a concert that "pointed the way to the road her life would take."

== Career ==
Anthony began her career in the music industry at RCA Records. She worked briefly at an artist management company and in 1978 was hired as an assistant to the head of promotion at Epic Associated Labels. She "assiduously worked her way up the ladder," and in 1988 moved to New York to become the senior vice president of promotion at Epic. In 1993 Anthony became the president of 550 Music, an Epic imprint, and in 1997 she was appointed president of Epic Records. Over the course of her career at Epic, she worked with artists including Celine Dion, Michael Jackson, Pearl Jam, and Rage Against the Machine.

In 2003 Anthony returned to California as the president of DreamWorks Records; after a corporate reorganization, she was named co-president of Geffen Records. In 2006, she became head of television and film for the Universal Music Group. She left Universal in 2010 to executive produce film and television projects. Among others, Anthony produced the HBO series Off the Record, Cane for CBS, and Betty & Coretta for Lifetime.

Anthony died of pancreatic cancer in September 2013.
