= Pleasures U Like =

Studio album by Jon B
- Released: March 20, 2001
- Length: 73:47
- Labels: Edmonds; Epic
- Producers: Jon B; Babyface; Joshua P. Thompson; Tim & Bob

Jon B chronology
Cool Relax (1997)	Pleasures U Like (2001)	Stronger Everyday (2004)

Singles from Pleasures U Like
- 1. "Don't Talk" Released: March 13, 2001

Pleasures U Like is the third studio album by American singer Jon B. Released on March 20, 2001 in the United States, it marked his first album under Tracey Edmonds' label Edmonds Record Group which was formed after Jon's previous label home Yab Yum Records had folded. The album features guest appearances from Nas, Faith Evans, Cuban Link, and AZ. On Pleasures U Like, Jon reunites with past producers Babyface and Tim Kelley and Bob Robinson, who each produced one song. Also present on the album is the team of musician Joshua P. Thompson and Quincy Patrick.

The album earned generally mixed reviews and opened at number six on the US Billboard 200 and number three on the Top R&B/Hip-Hop Albums chart, selling 99,000 in its debut week, while also becoming Jon B's first top ten album. Despite this, Jon felt it was not marketed and promoted properly. The only song released from the album as a single was "Don't Talk"- which was due primarily to Jon wanting to get out of his contract with Epic Records. As a result, this would be his final album released on a major label.

== Critical reception ==
Professional ratings
Review scores
Source	Rating
AllMusic	3/5 stars
NME	3/5 stars

Billboard critic Michael Paoletta noted that the "album takes listeners through various stages in a relationship — from "boy meets girl" to "I'd do it all again". The set's all- about-the-vibe spirit calls to Marvin Gaye's sensual 1973 sex ode Let's Get It On." But while a musically maturing Jon B. has a way to go before sliding into Gaye's bedroom slippers, he artfully connects the dots between soulful retro grooves and hip-hop beats." The Orlando Sentinel found that while" the title of his latest album sounds a little redundant," Pleasures U Like "is original, fun and basically a smooth hip-hop flavored R&B; album [...] If you enjoy fun hip-hop that makes you want to dance and sultry R&B; that speaks to the heart, this album is for you."

Tomika Anderson from Entertainment Weekly found that the singer "hits the bull's-eye with his beautiful love songs" and called the album "a soulful smorgasbord," based on the "right blend of intimacy and titillating sex grooves." AllMusic editor Ed Hogan rated the album three out of five stars. He called Pleasures U Like Jon B.'s "most consistent album to date" and noted that a "cool, nighttime dance club vibe flows through the album. Not every song is a dance track; there are also a number of appealing ballads." Diana Evans from NME called the "a sea of rather bland harmonies, limp beats and a ballad avalanche that borders on the tedious" and was "unlikely to bring about any drastic change in Jon's profile."

== Chart performance ==
Pleasures U Like bowed at number six on the US Billboard 200 and number three on the Top R&B/Hip-Hop Albums chart, selling 99,000 in its debut week, becoming the first top ten album for Jon B.

== Track listing ==
Pleasures U Like track listing
No.	Title	Writer(s)	Producer(s)	Length
1.	"Interlude"	Jonathan Buck	Jon B.	1:11
2.	"Finer Things" (featuring Nas)	Buck; Nasir Jones	Jon B.	5:01
3.	"Vibezelect Cafe" (Interlude)	Buck	Jon B.	0:20
4.	"Don't Talk"	Buck	Jon B.	4:44
5.	"Sof'n Sweet"	Buck; Tommy Brown	Jon B.	5:03
6.	"Overjoyed" (featuring Faith Evans)	Buck; Denaine Jones	Jon B.	5:36
7.	"Boy Is Not a Man"	Buck; Joshua P. Thompson; Quincy Patrick	Thompson, Patrick	4:22
8.	"Lonely Girl"	Buck; Kenneth Edmonds	Jon B.; Babyface	4:28
9.	"Cocoa Brown"	Buck	Jon B.	3:57
10.	"What Up Boogotti?" (Interlude)	Buck	Jon B.	0:14
11.	"All I Want is You" (featuring Cuban Link)	Buck; Felix Delgado	Jon B.	5:12
12.	"Been Played" (Interlude)	Buck	Jon B.	0:53
13.	"Layaway" (featuring AZ)	Buck; Anthony Cruz	Jon B.	4:10
14.	"Pleasures U Like"	Buck; Phillip White; Shawn Rivera; Darryl Anthony Hawes; LeDon Bishop; Ngai McGee	Jon B.	3:49
15.	"Now That I'm with You"	Buck; Tim Kelley; Bob Robinson	Tim & Bob	4:17
16.	"My Seed With You" (Interlude)	Buck	Jon B.	0:24
17.	"Tell Me"	Buck	Jon B.	4:56
18.	"Calling on You"	Buck; McGee	Jon B.	4:40
19.	"Inside"	Buck	Jon B.	4:57
20.	"Do It All Again"	Buck; David Kopp	Jon B.	4:56
Total length:				73:47

== Personnel ==
Performers and musicians

- Jon B. – drum programming, keyboards, vocals
- Babyface – background vocals, drum programming, keyboards
- LeDon Bishop– background vocals
- Tommy Brown – drum programming, keyboards
- Kevin Buck – bass
- Nathan East – bass guitar, cello
- Faith Evans – background vocals
- Kenisha L. Greene– background vocals
- Eric Jackson – guitar
- Tim Kelley – drum programming, keyboards
- Tim Kobza – guitar
- David Kopp – drum programming, keyboards
- Bill Meyers – horn conduction and arrangement
- Shawn Rivera– background vocals
- Bob Robinson – acoustic piano, fender rhodes, guitar
- Joshua P. Thompson – guitar
- Phillip "Silky" White – background vocals

Technical and management

- Conley Abrams – mixing, recording
- Jon B. – executive producer, mixing, recording
- Paul Boutin – recording
- Jeff Burroughs – executive producer
- Earl Cohen – mixing, recording
- Tracey Edmonds – executive producer
- Jon Gass – mixing
- Chris Gehringer – mastering
- Jerome Goodall – recording
- Dave Guererro – mixing
- JayJay Jackson – art direction and design
- Tim Kelley – recording
- Manny Marroquin – mixing
- Victor McCoy – mixing
- Michael McQuarn – executive producer
- Michael Patterson – mixing
- Dave Pensado – mixing, recording
- Josean Posey – mixing
- Norman Jean Roy – photography

== Charts ==
=== Weekly charts ===
Weekly chart performance for Pleasures U Like
Chart (2001)	Peak position
US Billboard 200	6
US Top R&B/Hip-Hop Albums (Billboard)	3

=== Year-end charts ===
Year-end performance for Pleasures U Like
Chart (2001)	Position
Canadian R&B Albums (SoundScan)	139
US Top R&B/Hip-Hop Albums (Billboard)	78
