= Comfortable Swagg =

Studio album by Jon B.
- Released: February 14, 2012
- Length: 56:02
- Label: Vibezelect
- Producer: Jon B.; Adonis Shropshire

Jon B. chronology
Helpless Romantic (2008)	Comfortable Swagg (2012)	Waiting on You (2025)

Singles from Comfortable Swagg
- 1. "Only One" Released: 2012

Comfortable Swagg is the seventh studio album by American singer Jon B. It was released independently on February 14, 2012 through his own label Vibezelect. The album spawned the single "Only One".

== Commercial performance ==
In January 2013, it was reported that Comfortable Swagg had sold more than 20,000 copies worldwide.

== Track listing ==
Comfortable Swagg track listing
No.	Title	Writer(s)	Length
1.	"Comfortable Swagg"	Jonathan Buck	4:06
2.	"Goin' Down"	Buck; Adonis Shropshire	4:23
3.	"Watch'n Now"	Buck	4:44
4.	"Fill Your Cup" (featuring DJ Quik)	Buck; David Blake	5:47
5.	"Make Up Love"	Buck	5:20
6.	"Only One"	Buck	5:10
7.	"Baby Maker"	Buck	3:35
8.	"My Distraction"	Buck	3:58
9.	"Drowning"	Buck	5:41
10.	"Do U Miss Me?"	Buck	5:13
11.	"Your Karma Sutra"	Buck	3:53
12.	"Amnesia"	Buck	4:07
Total length:			56:02

== Personnel ==
Credits adapted from the liner notes of Comfortable Swagg.

- Efani Allah (CreativeClientele) – photography
- Jon B. – songwriter, producer
- Jonesii – background vocals
- Stephen Marsh – mastering
- DJ Quik – rap
- Adonis Shropshire – songwriter, producer

== Release history ==
Comfortable Swagg release history
Region	Date	Format	Label	Ref(s)
Various	February 14, 2012	CD; Digital download	Vibezelect	
