= Jon-John Robinson =

American record producer and songwriter (born 1970)

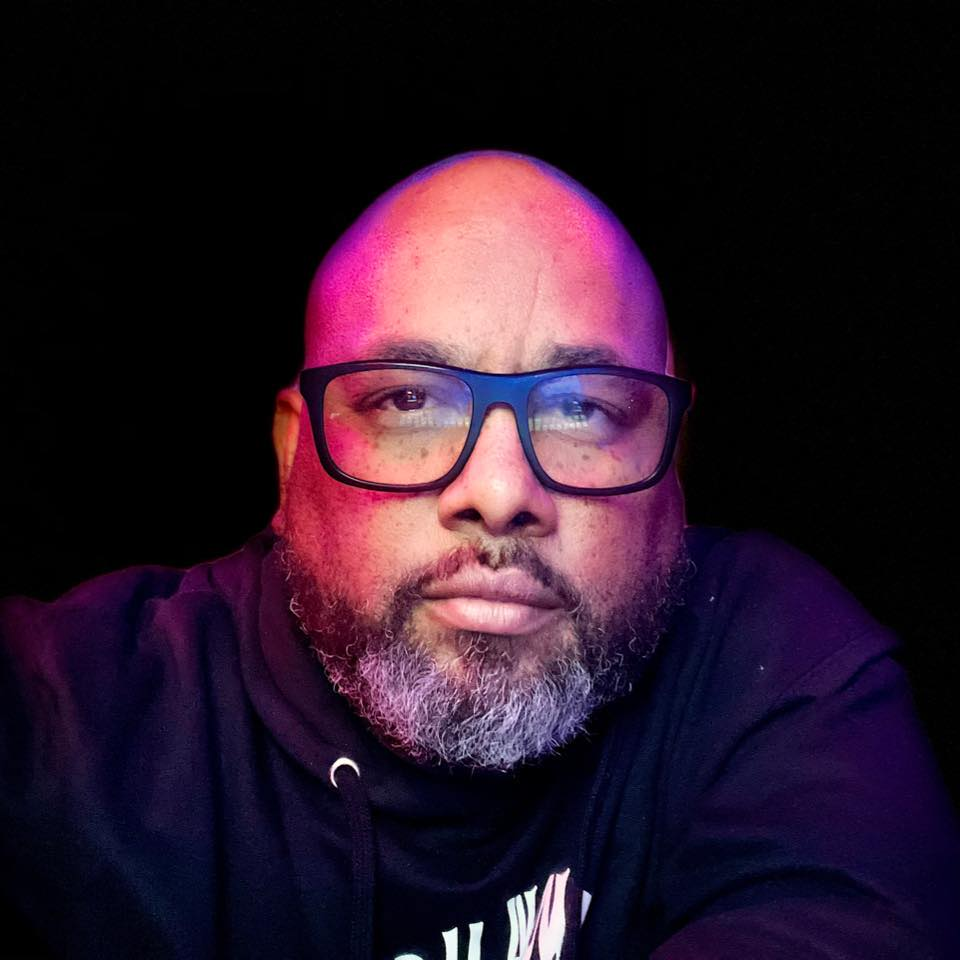

Background information
- Born: Jonathan Hillman Robinson; April 22, 1970 (age 56)
- Origin: Los Angeles, California, U.S.
- Genres: R&B, pop, hip hop
- Occupations: Producer, songwriter
- Years active: 1993–present
- Labels: YabYum Entertainment, Sony/ATV, Arkadia Music Group

Jon-John Robinson (born April 22, 1970) is an American record producer and songwriter who specializes in R&B, pop and hip-hop music.

== Career ==
Jon-John Robinson is a two-time Grammy award-winning, multi-platinum producer and a voting member of the Recording Academy. He signed his first publishing/production deal with former wife of Babyface, Tracey Edmonds. He has worked with many artists from TLC to Diana Ross.

Robinson formed an independent record label company, which mainly focuses on developing producers, artists and releasing digital media. He signed hip-hop artist K. Jackson, who was a former member of teen R&B group 3rd Storee, and actor from the television series Everybody Hates Chris. He released K. Jackson's first mix tape Beach House, and released Jackson's first single "Candy Man" on iTunes.

== Production discography ==
Year	Title	Peak chart positions			Certifications	Album
Year	Title	US	R&B	UK	Certifications	Album
1994	"Can't Get Enough" keyboards synths programming drums bass [Jon-John Robinson] (El DeBarge)	137	24	—		Heart Mind & Soul
1994	"Let's Do It Again" keyboards synths programming drums bass [Jon-John Robinson] (TLC)	2	3	—	23× Platinum Worldwide (Grammy Award Winning Album)	CrazySexyCool
1995	"Soon As I Get Over" keyboards synths programming drums bass [Jon-John Robinson] (Boyz of Paradise)	—	—	—		Boys of Paradise
1995	"I Wanna A Love Like That" "Dance With Me" keyboards synths programming drums bass [Jon-John Robinson] (Tony Thompson)	99	17	—		Sexsational
1995	"Keep It Right There" "Gone" keyboards synths programming drums bass [Jon-John Robinson] (Diana Ross)	138	14	—		Take Me Higher
1996	"Inseparable Lovers" "Time To End The Story" keyboards synths programming drums bass [Jon-John Robinson] (AZ Yet)	60	18	—		AZ Yet
1996	"How Could You" keyboards synths programming drums bass [Jon-John Robinson] (K-Ci & JoJo)	85	37	—		BulletProof (Original Soundtrack)
1997	"How Could You" keyboards synths programming drums bass [Jon-John Robinson] (K-Ci & JoJo)	6	2	—	3× Platinum	Love Always
1997	"Don't Say" "Love Hurts" keyboards synths programming drums bass [Jon-John Robinson] (Jon B)	33	5	—	Platinum	Cool Relax
1997	"Can't Let Go" "Infatuation" keyboards synths programming drums bass [Jon-John Robinson] (Luarnea)	80	—	—		Betta Listen
1997	"No More Fighting" "Anything For Your Love" "Nothing Compares" keyboards synths programming drums bass [Jon-John Robinson] (Tevin Campbell) (Jon B) (Az Yet)	185	26	—		Steel (Original Soundtrack)
1998	"I Wasn't with It" keyboards synths programming drums bass [Jon-John Robinson] (Jesse Powell)	63	15	—	Gold	Bout It
1998	"Eastside Girl" "You're My Everything" keyboards synths programming drums bass [Jon-John Robinson] (Myron)	156	38	—		Destiny
1998	"What I've Been Missin" keyboards synths programming drums bass [Jon-John Robinson] (Changing Faces)	39	6	—		Hav Plenty (Original Soundtrack)
1998	"So Young" keyboards synths programming drums bass [Jon-John Robinson] Tamia (Japan Release)	185	26	—	Gold	Tamia
1999	"Guess I Was A Fool" keyboards synths programming drums bass [Jon-John Robinson] (Another Level)	—	—	13	Platinum	Love Always
1999	"Get Down With Me" "Break Your Plans" keyboards synths programming drums bass [Jon-John Robinson] (Ideal)	83	19	—	Gold	Ideal
1999	"Just Can't Get You Off My Mind" "I Aint The One" keyboards synths programming drums bass [Jon-John Robinson] (Profyle)	—	67	—		Whispers In The Dark
1999	"Dry Your Eyes" keyboards synths programming drums bass [Jon-John Robinson] (3rd Storee)	—	—	—		The 3rd Storee
2000	"BlackHawk" keyboards synths programming drums bass [Jon-John Robinson] (Joe)	4	1	—	3× Platinum	My Name Is Joe
2000	"Love Hurts" keyboards synths programming drums bass [Jon-John Robinson] (Gladys Knight)	98	30	—	Gold (Grammy Award Winning Album)	At Last
2000	"Get Down" keyboards synths programming drums bass [Jon-John Robinson] (Amil)	45	—	—		All Money Is Legal
2000	"U Don't Got What I Want" "Let's Chill" keyboards synths programming drums bass [Jon-John Robinson] (Toni Estes)	—	—	—		Two Eleven
2002	"Funny" "One More Time" "Do What You Came To Do" keyboards synths programming drums bass [Jon-John Robinson] (3LW)	15	12	—		A Girl Can Mack
2007	"Intro" "I'm Hot" "1 Nite Stand" "So Sexy" keyboards synths programming drums bass [Jon-John Robinson] (India)	—	—	—		Role Play
2008	"Gone" keyboards synths programming drums bass [Jon-John Robinson] (Diana Ross)	—	—	—		Best of the Best: Love Songs
2008	"Let's Do it Again" keyboards synths programming drums bass [Jon-John Robinson] (TLC)	—	—	—		CrazySexyCool/3D
2009	"Disconnect" keyboards synths programming drums bass [Jon-John Robinson] (Kristinia DeBarge)	—	—	—		Exposed
2009	"Love Will Find A Way" keyboards synths programming drums bass [Jon-John Robinson] (Mishon)	—	—	—		Around The World In 50 Years (Original Soundtrack)
2010	"How Could You" keyboards synths programming drums bass [Jon-John Robinson] (Jodeci)	—	—	—		Icon 2
2012	"Allow Me To Introduce Myself" "Pinnochio" "Beautiful 2 Me" "Scumbag" "She Takes My Money" "Give It 2 You" "Off The Chain" "Shorty 3D" "Infinity Love" "Drive" "Where Did U Go" keyboards synths programming drums bass [Jon-John Robinson] (K. Jackson)	—	—	—		Allow Me To Introduce Myself
2013	"Feet Off the Floor" "If I Was Your Girl" "Dose of Your Own Medicine" "It's Over" "Love Bites (feat. K. Jackson") keyboards synths programming drums bass [Jon-John Robinson] (KylaRae)	—	—	—		Feet Off the Floor - EP
2013	"Love Will Find a Way" "My Love" "That's My Baby" "Uh Oh" "Sideline" "Up Up & Away" keyboards synths programming drums bass [Jon-John Robinson] (Tristan Blaine)	—	—	—		Up Up & Away
2013	"How Could You" keyboards synths programming drums bass [Jon-John Robinson] (K-Ci & JoJo)	—	—	—		Ballads
2017	"This Is Our Prayer" "Devotion" "The Power of A Prayer" "Perfect Rest (Nate's Song)" "In The Secret of The Stable" "Perfecter of Our Faith" "Stand. Still." "Shepherd King" "Father of All Days" "Oil of Blessing" keyboards synths programming drums bass [Jon-John Robinson] (Sharon Tedford)	—	—	—		STAND. STILL.
