= Someone to Love (Jon B. song) =

Single by Jon B. featuring Babyface

from the album Bonafide
- Released: 1995
- Recorded: 1994
- Genre: R&B
- Length: 4:33
- Label: Yab Yum; 550 Music
- Songwriter: Babyface
- Producer: Babyface

Jon B. singles chronology
"Someone to Love" (1995)	"Pretty Girl" (1995)

Babyface singles chronology
"Dream Away" (1994)	"Someone to Love" (1995)	"Slow Jams" (1996)

"Someone to Love" is a song by American R&B singer, songwriter and record producer Jon B. from his debut album, Bonafide (1995). Released as the first single from the album in 1995, the song is a duet with Babyface that gained wide exposure on the Bad Boys soundtrack. The song, with a style very much inspired by Babyface, peaked at number 10 on the US Hot 100 chart and at number 7 on the US R&B chart and was also certified gold by the RIAA.

The song received a Grammy Award nomination for the category Best Pop Collaboration with Vocals in 1996. The then 21-year-old Jon B. stated he felt the nomination was "an honor he could not have asked for."

== Personnel and credits ==
Credits adapted from the liner notes of Bonafide.

- Jon B. – lead vocals, background vocals, keyboard
- Babyface – lead vocals, background vocals, writer, producer, arranger, piano, drum programming
- Reggie Hamilton – guitar
- Randy Walker – MIDI programming
- Brad Gilderman – recording engineer
- Jon Gass – mix engineer

== Charts ==
=== Weekly charts ===
Weekly chart performance of "Someone to Love"
Chart (1995–1996)	Peak position
Australia (ARIA)	50
Canada Adult Contemporary (RPM)	47
Canada Retail Singles (The Record)	25
Iceland (Íslenski Listinn Topp 40)	23
New Zealand (Recorded Music NZ)	17
UK Singles (Official Charts)	98
US Billboard Hot 100	10
US Adult Contemporary (Billboard)	32
US Hot R&B/Hip-Hop Songs (Billboard)	7
US Pop Airplay (Billboard)	12
US Cash Box Top 100	5

=== Year-end charts ===
Year-end chart performance of "Someone to Love"
Chart (1995)	Position
US Billboard Hot 100	32
US Hot R&B Singles (Billboard)	18
US Cash Box Top 100	30

== Certifications ==
Region	Certification	Certified units/sales
United States (RIAA)	Gold	500,000^{^}
^{^} Shipments figures based on certification alone.
