= Are U Still Down =

Single by Jon B. featuring 2Pac

from the album Cool Relax
- Released: January 13, 1998
- Recorded: 1996–1997; 1996 (2Pac’s vocals)
- Genre: R&B; hip hop soul
- Length: 4:27
- Label: Yab Yum; 550 Music
- Songwriters: Jonathan Buck; Tupac Shakur; Johnny Jackson
- Producers: Tupac Shakur; Johnny Jackson

Jon B. singles chronology
"Don't Say" (1997)	"Are U Still Down" (1998)	"I Do (Whatcha Say Boo)" (1998)

2Pac singles chronology
"I Wonder If Heaven Got a Ghetto" (1997)	"Are U Still Down" (1998)	"Do for Love" (1998)

"Are U Still Down" is a song co-written and performed by American contemporary R&B singer Jon B, issued as a single from his second studio album Cool Relax. It was commissioned as a double single with "They Don't Know" in some markets, including the United States. The song features a rap by American hip hop musician 2Pac.

"Are U Still Down" was produced by Johnny J. In 2004, as a way of honoring Tupac, Jon B. recorded "Are U Still Down, Part 2" with the original producer. Johnny J also had plans to release unreleased Tupac records. In the song, Tupac's lyrics are sampled from his song "Happy Home" which was a part of his fourth posthumous album (seventh studio album overall) Until the End of Time, released on March 27, 2001.

"Are U Still Down" peaked at number 29 on the Billboard Hot 100 and number two on the R&B chart in 1998.

== Music video ==
A music video was commissioned for the song, directed by Tim Story.

== Charts ==
=== Weekly charts ===
Weekly chart performance for "Are U Still Down"
Chart (1998)	Peak position
US Billboard Hot 100	29
US Hot R&B/Hip-Hop Songs (Billboard)	2
US Rhythmic Airplay (Billboard)	18

=== Year-end charts ===
Year-end Chart performance of "Are U Still Down"
Chart (1998)	Position
US Hot R&B/Hip-Hop Songs (Billboard)	18

== Certifications ==
Region	Certification	Certified units/sales
United States (RIAA)	Platinum	1,000,000^{^}
^{^} Shipments figures based on certification alone.
