= Dave Pensado =

American mix engineer

- Origin: Los Angeles, California, U.S.
- Occupation: Mix engineer
- Years active: 1970s-present

Dave Pensado is a Grammy Award-winning mix engineer. His career began in Atlanta in the 1970s and 1980s doing live and studio sound engineering. He has lived in Los Angeles since 1990.

He mixes between 200 and 250 songs a year at Larrabee Studios in Los Angeles. When recording he usually records at Echo Bar Studios in North Hollywood.

On September 12, 2011, Pensado started a weekly show called Pensado's Place, together with Herb Trawick, his manager and business partner. The first part of the show is about audio engineering techniques; Pensado evaluates - sometimes assisted or replaced by a guest speaker - plugins, outboard gear like microphones, and demonstrates how to improve the mix. The second part is an interview of a mixing engineer, master engineer, producer, label CEO or singer-songwriter. Pensado and Trawick created the show to educate engineers on gear and technique while giving credit to pioneers of the industry. In January 2020, the pair were inducted into the TEC Hall of Fame in recognition of the show's contribution to audio education.

On July 20, 2013, Pensado and Trawick hosted an event at Vintage King Los Angeles called "Pensado Gear Expo 2013". More than one thousand people from around the world attended. 22-time Grammy Award-winning engineer, Al Schmitt, Steven Slate, Alex da Kid, Ryan Hewitt, and Robert Duncan were a few of the featured guests of the expo.

== Equipment ==
At first, Pensado occasionally demonstrates outboard analog gear, but later on, he only processes/edits audio tracks with his computer, which is also called mixing 'in the box', before sending his mixes to a mastering engineer. For all demonstrations he uses Pro Tools as his DAW (digital audio workstation), and the show is sponsored by audio companies he respects.

== Awards ==
Pensado won a Grammy Award, alongside fellow engineers Jaycen Joshua and Kuk Harrell, for Mary J. Blige's 2008 Best Contemporary R&B Album, Growing Pains.

Pensado was the recipient of the 2020 NAMM TEC (Technical Excellence & Creativity) Hall of Fame Award. Pensado was officially inducted into the NAMM TEC Hall of Fame at the 35th Annual NAMM TEC Awards, held on January 18 in Anaheim, California during the NAMM Show.

== Discography ==
Year	Title	Artist	Role
2016	Sounds of the Sea	The Cetacea Boys	Mixing
2016	R&B Anthems		Mixing
2015	Golden Moments	Jill Scott	Mixing
2015	Rub	Peaches	Mixing
2015	The Story Continues	After Romeo	Mixing
2014	Happy Hour: The Greatest Hits	T-Pain	Mixing
2014	Holiday	Earth	Mixing
2014	Me. I Am Mariah...The Elusive Chanteuse	Mariah Carey	Mixing
2014	The Lyricists' Opus	Chrisette Michele	Mixing
2014	The Way	Macy Gray	Mixing
2014	Xscape	Michael Jackson	Mixing
2013	Write It On A Wall	Xai	Mixing
2013	Break the Pot	Rich Boy	Mixing
2013	Now, Then & Forever	Earth	Mixing
2013	Rocks and Honey	Bonnie Tyler	Mixing
2012	Breathless/At Last... The Duets Album	Kenny G	Mixing
2012	Greatest Hits, Chapter 1	Kelly Clarkson	Mixing
2012	R&B: The Collection	[Rhino]	Mixing
2012	Decode	Exilia	Mixing
2011	1977	The-Dream / Terius Nash	Mixing
2011	A Family Business	Brandy / Ray J	Mixing
2011	A.N.T.	Farm	Mixing
2011	Contact	Boney James	Mixing
2011	Gloria	Gloria Trevi	Mezcla
2011	Killer Love	Nicole Scherzinger	Mixing
2011	Roy: Tribute to Roy Orbison	Damien Leith	Mixing
2011	The Light of the Sun	Jill Scott	Mixing
2011	Heal	Andrea Renzullo	Mixing
2010	Calling All Hearts	Keyshia Cole	Mixing
2010	Charice	Charice	Mixing
2010	Greatest Hits... So Far!!!	P!nk	Mixing
2010	Just Dance, Vol. 3		Mixing
2010	Love King	The-Dream	Mixing
2010	Luna Nueva	Debi Nova	Mixing
2010	Monkey Business/Elephunk/Bridging the Gap	The Black Eyed Peas	Mixing
2010	Pulse	Toni Braxton	Mixing
2010	StarStruck	Disney	Mixing
2010	Still Standing	Monica	Mixing
2010	The Love Trilogy	The-Dream	Mixing
2010	Twenty Ten: Greatest Hits	Guy Sebastian	Mixing
2010	Uni5: The World's Enemy	Bone Thugs-n-Harmony	Mixing
2010	Wear My Kiss	Sugababes	Mixing
2009	Above and Beyoncé: Video Collection & Dance Mixes	Beyoncé	Mixing
2009	Charmbracelet/The Emancipation of Mimi/E=MC2	Mariah Carey	Mixing
2009	D.N.A.	Mario	Mixing
2009	Days Difference	Days Difference	Mixing
2009	Deeper Than Rap	Rick Ross	Mixing
2009	Def Jam 25: DJ Bring That Back		Mixing
2009	Differently	Cassie Davis	Mixing
2009	Evolution of a Man	Brian McKnight	Mixing
2009	Fantasy Ride	Ciara	Mixing
2009	Fight for Love	Elliott Yamin	Mixing
2009	Forever in a Day	Day26	Mixing
2009	Guilty Pleasure	Ashley Tisdale	Mixing
2009	Hits	Seal	Mixing
2009	How to Be a Lady, Vol. 1	Electrik Red	Mixing
2009	I Look to You	Whitney Houston	Mixing
2009	Just Dance, Vol. 2		Mixing
2009	Just Go	Lionel Richie	Mixing
2009	Lady Love	LeToya	Mixing
2009	Let It	Beat Shwayze	Mixing
2009	Let's Get Crazy	Cassie	Mixing
2009	Love vs Money	The-Dream	Mixing
2009	Memoirs of an Imperfect Angel	Mariah Carey	Mixing
2009	My World	Justin Bieber	Mixing
2009	P!nk Box	P!nk	Mixing
2009	Ready	Trey Songz	Mixing
2009	Round 2	J. Holiday	Mixing
2009	Ruthless	Ace Hood	Mixing
2009	She Wolf	Shakira	Mixing, Mixing Engineer
2009	Soft White	Mack 10	Mixing
2009	Still	BeBe & CeCe Winans	Mixing
2009	Stronger with Each Tear	Mary J. Blige	Mixing
2009	Sweet 7	Sugababes	Mixing
2009	The Rebirth	Bobby V	Mixing
2009	This Is Us	Backstreet Boys	Mixing
2009	This Is the One	Utada	Mixing
2009	Toussaint St. Jean: From the Hut, To the Projects, To the Mansion	Wyclef Jean	Mixing
2009	Untitled	R. Kelly	Mixing
2008	A Different Me	Keyshia Cole	Mixing
2008	A Long Time Coming	Wayne Brady	Mixing
2008	Best of Hilary Duff	Hilary Duff	Engineer, Audio Engineer, Mixing
2008	Best of the Best: Love Songs	Diana Ross	Mixing
2008	Black Summer Party: Best Of, Vol. 5		Mixing
2008	Brutha	Brutha	Mixing
2008	Call and Response: The Remix Album	Maroon 5	Mixing
2008	Colby O	Colby O'Donis	Mixing
2008	Cookie Jar	The-Dream / Gym Class Heroes	Mixing
2008	Departure	Jesse McCartney	Mixing
2008	Discipline	Janet Jackson	Mixing
2008	Doll Domination	The Pussycat Dolls	Mixing
2008	Dream a Little	Jimmy Demers	Mixing
2008	E=MC²	Mariah Carey	Mixing
2008	Exit 13	LL Cool J	Mixing
2008	First Love	Karina	Mixing
2008	Girlicious	Girlicious	Mixing
2008	Here I Stand	Usher	Mixing
2008	I Am...Sasha Fierce	Beyoncé	Mixing
2008	I'll Be Home for Christmas	Brian McKnight	Enhanced CD Audio Creation
2008	Intuition	Jamie Foxx	Mixing
2008	Just a Rolling Stone	Donnie Klang	Mixing
2008	Keeps Gettin' Better: A Decade of Hits	Christina Aguilera	Mixing, Audio Production, Assistant Engineer
2008	Music in My Soul	Leigh Jones	Engineer, Audio Engineer, Mixing
2008	OnMyRadio	Musiq Soulchild	Mixing
2008	Playlist: Woman		Mixing
2008	Prima J	Prima J	Mixing
2008	Raven-Symoné	Raven-Symoné	Mixing
2008	Shwayze	Shwayze	Mixing
2008	Sol-Angel and the Hadley St. Dreams	Solange	Mixing
2008	Texas	Playradioplay!	Mixing
2008	The Best Love...Ever!		Mixing
2008	The Hits	Kelis	Mixing
2008	The Quilt	Gym Class Heroes	Mixing
2008	The Truth	Cherish	Mixing
2008	Theater of the Mind	Ludacris	Mixing
2008	True to the Game		Mixing
2008	Turbo 919	Sean Garrett	Mixing
2008	Uncle Charlie	Charlie Wilson	Mixing
2008	Yours, Mine and the Truth	Sterling Simms	Mixing
2007	All in My Blood	Wiz Khalifa	Mixing
2007	Big	Macy Gray	Mixing
2007	Bratz [Original Soundtrack]	Bratz	Mixing
2007	Ghetto Passport	Famouz	Mixing
2007	Greatest Hits	Groove Armada	Mixing
2007	Growing Pains	Mary J. Blige	Mixing
2007	Just Like You	Keyshia Cole	Mixing
2007	Look What You Made Me	Yung Berg	Enhanced Recording
2007	Love Is Wicked	Brick & Lace	Mixing
2007	Love/Hate	The-Dream	Mixing
2007	P!nk Box [2007]	P!nk	Mixing
2007	Souljaboytellem.com	Soulja Boy Tell Em	Mixing
2007	Soundboy Rock	Groove Armada	Mixing
2007	Spirit	Leona Lewis	Mixing
2007	Strength & Loyalty	Bone Thugs-N-Harmony	Mixing
2007	System	Seal	Audio Engineer, Mixing
2007	Taking Chances	Céline Dion	Mixing
2007	The Best of Me: Yolanda Adams Greatest Hits	Yolanda Adams	Mixing
2007	The Cool	Lupe Fiasco	Enhanced Recording
2007	The Real Thing: Words and Sounds, Vol. 3	Jill Scott	Mixing
2007	The Rise and Fall of Keite Young	Keite Young	Mixing
2007	Trey Day	Trey Songz	Mixing
2007	Tyler Perry's Daddy's Little Girls	Tyler Perry	Mixing
2007	We Ride (I See the Future)	Mary J. Blige	Mixing
2006	A Mary Mary Christmas	Mary Mary	Supervisor
2006	A Public Affair	Jessica Simpson	Mixing
2006	Aura	Yvonne Catterfeld	Mixing
2006	B'day	Beyoncé	Mixing
2006	Back to Basics	Christina Aguilera	Mixing
2006	Be Without You	Mary J. Blige	Mixing
2006	Christina Aguilera/Stripped	Christina Aguilera	Mixing
2006	Club Bangers		Mixing
2006	Coming Home	Lionel Richie	Mixing
2006	Dance Revolution	The Slumber Party Girls	Mixing
2006	Director	Avant	Mixing
2006	Heart to Yours/Do You Know	Michelle Williams	Mixing
2006	I Don't Need a Man	The Pussycat Dolls	Mixing
2006	In My Own Words	Ne-Yo	Mixing
2006	Kelis Was Here	Kelis	Mixing
2006	Light Poles and Pine Trees	Field Mob	Mixing
2006	Live in London	The Pussycat Dolls	Mixing
2006	Loose	Nelly Furtado	Mixing
2006	Maneater	Nelly Furtado	Mixing
2006	My Book	K-Ci	Mixing
2006	My Friends & Me	Dionne Warwick	Mixing
2006	Point of No Return	Shareefa	Mixing
2006	Reflections (A Retrospective)	Mary J. Blige	Mixing
2006	Step Up		Mixing
2006	Ten	Brian McKnight	Mixing
2006	Testimony, Vol. 1: Life & Relationship	India.Arie	Mixing
2005	#1's	Destiny's Child	Mixing
2005	Beautiful Life/Just As I Am	Guy Sebastian	Mixing
2005	Check on It [Single]	Beyoncé / Slim Thug	Mixing
2005	Cool Traxx!, Vol. 2		Remixing
2005	Day by Day	Yolanda Adams	Mixing
2005	Desperate Housewives [TV Soundtrack]		Mixing
2005	Divorcing Neo 2 Marry Soul	Jaguar Wright	Mixing
2005	Gemini	Brian McKnight	Mixing
2005	Girl, Pt. 1	Destiny's Child	Mixing
2005	Hero	Kirk Franklin	Mixing
2005	I Am Not My Hair	India.Arie	Mixing
2005	Illumination	Earth	Mixing
2005	In Public	Kelis	Mixing
2005	In This Life Together	Kindred the Family Soul	Mixing
2005	In the Mid-Nite Hour	Warren G	Mixing
2005	In the Mix [Music from the Motion Picture]		Mixing
2005	Killer Queen: A Tribute to Queen		Mixing
2005	Lost and Found	Will Smith	Mixing, Composer
2005	Missundaztood/Can't Take Me Home	P!nk	Mixing
2005	PCD	The Pussycat Dolls	Mixing
2005	Sweatsuit	Nelly	Vocal Mixing
2005	The Breakthrough	Mary J. Blige	Mixing
2005	The Way It Is	Keyshia Cole	Mixing
2005	This is Me	Jully Black	Engineer
2005	Tilt Ya Head Back	Nelly	Vocal Mixing
2005	When Love Is Gone	Martin Nievera	Mixing
2004	At Last...The Duets Album	Kenny G	Mixing
2004	Barbershop 2: Back in Business		Mixing
2004	Beautiful Life	Guy Sebastian	Mixing
2004	Believe in Angels Believe in Me	Angel	Mixing, A&R
2004	Cherie	Cherie	Engineer, Mixing
2004	Destiny Fulfilled	Destiny's Child	Mixing
2004	Do You Know	Michelle Williams	Mixing
2004	Grammy Nominees 2004		Mixing
2004	I Changed My Mind	Keyshia Cole	Engineer
2004	Just for You	Lionel Richie	Mixing
2004	Let's Talk About It	Carl Thomas	Mixing
2004	Never	Keyshia Cole	Mixing
2004	Outrun the Sky	Lalah Hathaway	Mixing
2004	Shark Tale		Mixing
2004	Sweat	Nelly	Vocal Mixing
2004	The Collection	Dina Carroll	Mixing
2004	The Ultimate R&B Album		Mixing
2004	The Very Best of Macy Gray	Macy Gray	Mixing
2004	Throwback	Boyz II Men	Mixing
2004	Tiffany Villarreal	Tiffany Villareal	Mixing
2004	Walkin' in the Shadow of Life	Neville Brothers	Mixing
2003	Biker Boyz		Mixing
2003	Chasing Time II	Martin Nievera	Mixing
2003	Emosoul	D.J. Rogers Jr.	Mixing
2003	Fallen	Mya	Mixing
2003	Falling Uphill	Lillix	Mixing
2003	In This Skin	Jessica Simpson	Mixing
2003	Low	Kelly Clarkson	Mixing
2003	Miss Independent	Kelly Clarkson	Mixing
2003	Moodring	Mya	Mixing
2003	My Love Is Like...Wo	Mya	Mixing
2003	Rose Falcon	Rose Falcon	Mixing
2003	Solo Star	Solange	Mixing
2003	Tasty	Kelis	Mixing
2003	Thankful	Kelly Clarkson	Mixing
2003	The Fighting	Temptations	Mixing
2003	Trouble [Import CD]	P!nk	Mixing
2003	Try This	P!nk	Mixing
2003	U Turn	Brian McKnight	Mixing
2002	Amor Secreto	Luis Fonsi	Mixing
2002	Austin Powers in Goldmember [Original Soundtrack]		Mixing
2002	Dirrty	Christina Aguilera	Mixing
2002	Dirty	Child Rosey	Mixing
2002	El Cool Magnifico	Coolio	Mixing
2002	Emotional	K-Ci & JoJo Engineer,	Mixing
2002	Family Portrait	P!nk	Mixing
2002	Fight the Feeling	Luis Fonsi	Mixing
2002	From There to Here: 1989-2002	Brian McKnight	Mixing
2002	Full Circle	Boyz II Men	Mixing
2002	Full Moon	Brandy	Mixing
2002	Fun Rose	Falcon	Mixing
2002	Get the Party Started [Australia CD]	P!nk	Mixing
2002	Go-Get-Her/Nowhere	Vi3	Mixing
2002	Greatest Hits	Jon B.	Mixing
2002	Justified	Justin Timberlake	Mixing
2002	Love & War	Jerzee Monet	Mixing
2002	Moulin Rouge [Original Soundtrack]		Mixing
2002	Scooby-Doo [Original Soundtrack]		Mixing
2002	Simply Deep	Kelly Rowland	Mixing
2002	So Tight	Vi3	Mixing
2002	Stole [4 Track Single]	Kelly Rowland	Mixing
2002	Stripped	Christina Aguilera	Mixing
2002	This Is the Remix	Destiny's Child	Mixing
2002	Transporter [Original Soundtrack]		Mixing
2002	Virginity	TG4	Mixing
2001	8 Days of Christmas	Destiny's Child	Mixing
2001	A Girl Like Me	Emma Bunton	Mixing
2001	Atlantis: The Lost Empire (Soundtrack)	James Newton Howard	Mixing
2001	BBD Bell	Biv DeVoe	Mixing, Mixing Engineer
2001	Down to Earth [Music from the Motion Picture]		Mixing
2001	Dr. Dolittle 2		Mixing
2001	Greatest Hits	Ice Cube	Mixing
2001	JP	Jesse Powell	Mixing
2001	Jersey Ave.	Jersey Ave.	Mixing
2001	Joy Enriquez	Joy Enriquez	Mixing
2001	Lady Marmalade	Christina Aguilera / Missy Elliott / Mya / P!nk	Mixing
2001	Legally Blonde		Mixing
2001	M!ssundaztood	P!nk	Mixing
2001	MTV: TRL Christmas		Mixing
2001	Pleasures U Like	Jon B.	Mixing
2001	Pure R&B, Vol. 2		Mixing
2001	Superhero	Brian McKnight	Mixing
2001	Survivor	Destiny's Child	Mixing
2001	The Very Best of Dina Carroll	Dina Carroll	Mixing
2001	The Brothers [2001]		Mixing
2001	Victoria Beckham	Victoria Beckham	Mixing
2000	Black Trash: The Autobiography of Kirk Jones	Sticky Fingaz	Mixing
2000	Bridging the Gap	The Black Eyed Peas	Mixing
2000	Fearless	Crystal Lewis	Mixing
2000	Gift of Love	Diana Ross	Mixing
2000	Gotta Tell You	Samantha Mumba	Producer, Mixing
2000	La Colección	Crystal Lewis	Mixing
2000	Love & Basketball [Soundtrack]		Mixing
2000	Men of Honor	Mark Isham	Mixing
2000	My Kind of Christmas	Christina Aguilera	Mixing
2000	Nutty Professor II: The Klumps		Mixing
2000	Paris: New York	Marc Laurens	Mixing
2000	Remix Plus	Christina Aguilera	Mixing
2000	Revelation	98°	Mixing
2000	The Hurricane [Original Soundtrack]		Mixing
2000	X	K-Ci & JoJo	Mixing
2000	You Can't Resist	Jessica	Mixing
1999	24-7	Kevon Edmonds	Mixing
1999	5 for 1 5	Young Men	Mixing
1999	Chocolate Mood	Marc Nelson	Mixing
1999	Christina Aguilera	Christina Aguilera	Mixing
1999	Coolio's Crowbar Records Presents a Compilation of New Artists		Mixing
1999	Elton John and Tim Rice's "Aida"	Elton John / Tim Rice	Mixing
1999	Enrique	Enrique Iglesias	Mixing
1999	Hot Coko	Coko	Mixing
1999	I Love You...Me	Cherokee	Mixing
1999	I Want It All	Warren G	Mixing
1999	It's Real	K-Ci & JoJo	Mixing
1999	Marvin Is 60: A Tribute Album		Mixing
1999	Northern Star	Melanie C	Mixing
1999	Pokémon: The First Movie		Mixing
1999	Shanice	Shanice	Mixing
1999	Trina & Tamara	Trina & Tamara	Mixing
1999	Unleash the Dragon	Sisqó	Mixing, Mixing Engineer
1999	What a Girl Wants	Christina Aguilera	Mixing
1998	12 Soulful Nights of Christmas	Jermaine Dupri	Mixing
1998	4 Bruthas and a Bass	Solo	Mixing
1998	Behind the Front	The Black Eyed Peas	Mixing
1998	Bethlehem	Brian McKnight	Mixing
1998	Breath from Another	Esthero	Mixing
1998	Fame	L.A.	Mixing
1998	In Love at Christmas	K-Ci & JoJo	Mixing
1998	Only You	Tami Davis	Mixing
1997	BeBe Winans	BeBe Winans	Mixing
1997	Betta Listen	Laurneá	Mixing
1997	C U When U Get There	Coolio	Mixing
1997	Greatest Hits	Eternal	Mixing
1997	Love Always	K-Ci & JoJo	Mixing
1997	My Soul	Coolio	Mixing
1997	Rahsaan Patterson Rahsaan Patterson	Engineer	Mixing
1997	Samantha Cole	Samantha Cole	Engineer
1997	Steel		Mixing
1996	Back to the World Tevin Campbell	Engineer,	Mixing
1996	I Am L.V.	L.V.	Mixing
1996	Light Years	Jamiroquai	Mixing
1996	Jermaine Dupri Presents: Soulful Nights of Christmas	Jermaine Dupri	Mixing
1995	Damn Thing Called Love	After 7	Mixing
1995	Do You Wanna Ride?	Adina Howard	Mixing
1995	I Remember You	Brian McKnight	Engineer
1995	Out of the Blu	Blu	Producer, Synthesizer, Drum Programming
1995	Reflections	After 7	Mixing
1995	We Got It	Immature	Mixing
1994	Blankman		Mixing
1994	For You	London Jones	Mixing
1994	Hot & Ready	Raja-Nee	Mixing
1994	Sugar Hill	Producer, Engineer,	Mixing
1994	Time	Atlantic Starr	Mixing
1994	Treat U Right	Blackgirl	Mixing
1993	Afro-Plane	Afro-Plane	Engineer
1993	Five XI	Five XI	Mixing
1993	It's Real	The Real Seduction	Composer
1993	Love's Alright	Eddie Murphy	Mixing
1993	The Meteor Man		Mixing
1993	Whole New Head	One II 3	Engineer, Mixing, Mixing Engineer
1992	Countess	Countess Vaughn Producer, Mixing,	Remixing
1992	Crazy Coolin'	The Barrio Boyzz	Mixing
1992	On Our Worst Behavior	Immature	Producer, Mixing, Production Technician
1992	White Men Can't Jump		Producer, Engineer, Composer
1991	Freezin' 'Em	Level III	Producer, Engineer, Mixing, Vocal Engineer, Composer
1991	Live Your Life Be Free	Belinda Carlisle	Remixing
1991	Livin' It Up [Cassette Single]	Trent Dean	Mixing
1991	Ricca	Ricca	Mixing
1991	Spellbound	Paula Abdul	Engineer
1991	WBBD - Bootcity! The Remix Album	Bell Biv DeVoe	Remixing
1991	What Comes Naturally	Sheena Easton	Engineer
1990	Notes of a Native Son	Laquan	Mixing
1990	Ralph Tresvant	Ralph Tresvant	Mixing
1990	Tommy Boy's Greatest Hits		Mixing
1988	Too Tuff	Brick	Engineer
	Breakdance Party		Mixing

== Alumni ==
Some successful audio engineers & producers that have assisted for Dave Pensado in the past include Sylvia Massy, Jaycen Joshua, Manny Marroquin, Dylan "3-D" Dresdow, Ariel Chobaz, Ethan Willoughby, Nico Hamui, and Rafael Fadul.
