= Stronger Everyday =

Studio album by Jon B
- Released: October 5, 2004
- Recorded: Vibezelect Studios (Pasadena, California); Heat Recording; Mojo Digital Recordings (Hollywood, California); Unsung Studios (Los Angeles, California); Baseline Studios (New York City, New York)
- Length: 71:19
- Label: Sanctuary Urban; E2
- Producer: Jon B.; Babyface; Just Blaze; Brainz; The Champ; Mike City; Johnny "J"; Obi Nwobosi; Michael Angelo Saulsberry

Jon B chronology
Pleasures U Like (2001)	Stronger Everyday (2004)	Holiday Wishes: From Me to You (2006)

UK Edition Cover

Stronger Everyday is the fourth studio album by American singer Jon B. It was released October 5, 2004 on Sanctuary Records. The album spawned the singles "Everytime" and "Lately".

== Background ==
After recording three albums for Epic Records, Jon B. felt he was being underpromoted. Stronger Everyday was originally recorded under DreamWorks Records under the working title Everyday Struggles, but the label folded in early 2004 before Jon got to release any material. In 2004, he was signed to Sanctuary by Destiny's Child manager Mathew Knowles who was just hired as the president of urban music at the primarily rock oriented label.

== Critical reception ==
Professional ratings
Review scores
Source	Rating
AllMusic	3.5/5 stars

AllMusic found that Stronger Everyday "finds a sweet soul groove and hangs in there for five alluringly sensual tracks before switching into a hip-hop-inspired style, and these tracks include guest shots from Scarface and Tupac [...] Whether he's gliding along a mellow tune or working an up-tempo beat, Jon B. presents some of his finest songs on Stronger Everyday."

== Track listing ==
Stronger Everyday track listing
No.	Title	Writer(s)	Producer(s)	Length
1.	"Everytime" (featuring Dirt McGirt)	Jonathan Buck; Keil Holliwood; Jack Knight; Mechalie Jamison; Russell Jones; Justin Smith	Just Blaze	5:04
2.	"Lately"	Buck; Durrell Babbs; Ainsoworth Prasad; Obi Nwobosi; Kenneth Edmonds	Brainz; Nwobosi	3:25
3.	"One More Dance"	Buck; Holliwood	Jon B.	4:50
4.	"I'm Right Here"	Knight; Luke Larkin; Shannon Jones; Michael Angelo Saulsberry	Michael Angelo	3:24
5.	"Hands on U"	Michael Flowers	Mike City	4:07
6.	"Patience"	Buck; Holliwood; Nathan Cruise, Jr.	Jon B.	4:39
7.	"Part 2" (featuring Tupac Shakur)	Buck; Johnny Jackson; Shakur	Johnny "J"	4:02
8.	"Stronger Everyday" (featuring Tank)	Buck; Babbs; Bernard Edwards; Nile Rodgers	Jon B.	4:00
9.	"Thru the Fire" (featuring Scarface)	Buck; Holliwood; Jamison; Brad Jordan	Jon B.	5:51
10.	"What in the World"	Buck	Jon B.	4:10
11.	"Az U"	Buck; Holliwood; Eric Allen	Jon B.	4:15
12.	"Multiple"	Buck; Tommie McLaughlin; Joaquin Bynum; Jason Edmonds; Jerome Goodall	The Champ	4:10
13.	"Lay It Down"	Buck; Jamie Stemmons	Jon B.	4:10
14.	"Before It's Gone"	Buck; Holliwood	Jon B.	5:04
15.	"What I Like About You" (featuring Babyface)	Buck; K. Edmonds	Babyface	4:24
16.	"Everytime" (remix featuring Beenie Man & Farena)	Buck; Smith; Ainsoworth Prasad; Doron "Jr." Bell; Anthony President; Moses Anthony Davis	Just Blaze	4:24
Total length:				71:19

Notes

- "Stronger Everyday" contains a sample "Somebody Loves Me" as performed by Sister Sledge.
- "Thru the Fire" features samples from the Aretha Franklin recording "Precious Memories."

== Personnel ==
Musicians

- Ale-Oop – drum programming
- Jon B. – bass, keyboards, drum programming
- Babyface – background vocals, guitar, keyboards, drum programming
- Just Blaze – keyboards, drum programming
- Mike City – keyboards, drum programming
- Brainz Dimillo – keyboards, drum programming
- Jason Edmond – background vocals
- Envyi – background vocals
- Tim Kobza – guitar
- Conesha Monet – background vocals
- Gregg P. – drum programming
- Anthony President – keyboards, drum programming
- Michael Angelo Saulsberry – keyboards, drum programming
- Daryl Spencer – guitar
- Tank – background vocals, piano

Technical

- Andiri Inc. – package design
- Jon B. – executive producer, recording engineer
- Ian Boxhill – mixing engineer
- Kevin "KD" Davis – mixing engineer
- Brainz Dimlllo – recording engineer
- Tracey E. Edmonds – executive producer
- Serban Ghenea – mixing engineer
- Franny "Franchise" Graham – recording engineer
- Jerome Goodall – recording engineer
- Jean-Marie Horvat – mixing engineer
- Mathew Knowles – executive producer
- Michael McQuarn – executive producer
- Bob Power – mixing engineer
- Ozz Saturne – co-executive producer
- Dexter Simmons – mixing engineer
- Corey Wells – recording engineer
- Ryan West – recording engineer
- Wayne Williams – recording engineer

== Charts ==
Chart performance for Stronger Everyday
Chart (2004)	Peak position
US Billboard 200	140
US Top R&B/Hip-Hop Albums (Billboard)	17
