= Jon B. =

American R&B singer

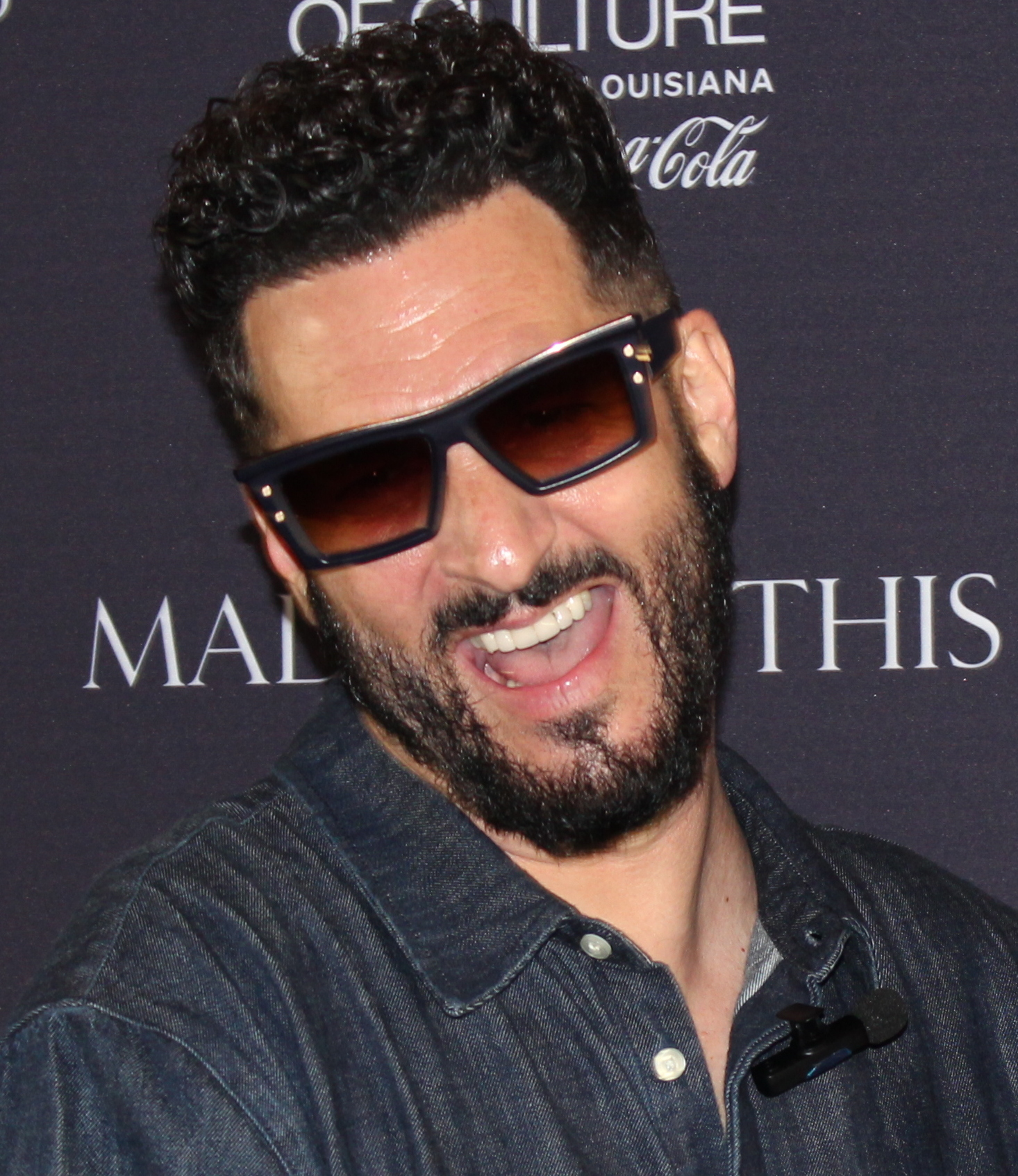
- Jon B. in 2025

Background information
- Born: Jonathan David Buck; 1975 or 1976 (age 50–51); Providence, Rhode Island, U.S.
- Origin: Pasadena, California, U.S.
- Genres: R&B; soul
- Occupations: Singer; songwriter; record producer
- Years active: 1992–present
- Labels: E1; Vibezelect; Arsenal; Edmonds Music; Sanctuary; Yab Yum; 550; Epic
- Spouse: Danette Jackson
- Website: jonbworld.com

Jonathan David Buck is an American R&B singer, songwriter and record producer. His debut album Bonafide (1995) spawned the hit singles "Pretty Girl" and "Someone to Love" (featuring Babyface), the latter of which reached the top ten on the Billboard Hot 100 and was nominated at the Grammys Awards for Best Pop Collaboration with Vocals. His second album Cool Relax (1997), was certified platinum by the Recording Industry Association of America (RIAA). Cool Relax included the hit singles "Are U Still Down" (featuring Tupac Shakur) and "They Don't Know". His third album, Pleasures U Like (2001) reached the top ten on the Billboard 200 chart.

== Early life ==
Born in Providence, Rhode Island and raised in Altadena, California, Buck comes from a musical family—his father, David, was a professor of music; his mother, Linda, was a concert pianist; his sister Deborah was a violinist; and his brother Kevin was a cellist. His mother is Jewish and his father is of Dutch descent. In 1992, Jon B. was shopping demos when he caught the attention of Tracey Edmonds, then-president and CEO of Yab-Yum Records.

== Career ==
=== 1994–1997: Bonafide and Cool Relax ===
Buck initially pursued a songwriting career, and wrote songs for After 7, Toni Braxton, Michael Jackson, Color Me Badd and others.

While on tour promoting Cool Relax, he formed a group with two of his backup singers, Dominiquinn and Silky Deluxe, collectively named Jack Herrera.

=== 2023–present: Comeback and future prospects ===
In 2023, it was announced that Jon B. and Tank would team up for a new release.

== Artistry ==
In the late 1990s, Buck noted that he was inspired by the neo soul movement, stating "There's a wave of music now that's crossing racial and cultural barriers--like Lauryn Hill, Erykah Badu, and D'Angelo-that's bringing back the classic soul sound." while adding "That's the sound that has influenced me the most in my life."

== Personal life ==
Buck is married to Danette Jackson. The couple have two daughters; L'Wren True and Azure Luna together.

== Discography ==
Studio albums

- Bonafide (1995)
- Cool Relax (1997)
- Pleasures U Like (2001)
- Stronger Everyday (2004)
- Holiday Wishes: From Me to You (2006)
- Helpless Romantic (2008)
- Comfortable Swagg (2012)
- B-Side Collection (2013)
- Waiting on You (2025)

== Awards and nominations ==
| Year | Award | Category | Nominee(s) | Result | Ref. |
|---|---|---|---|---|---|
| 1996 | Grammy Awards | Best Pop Collaboration with Vocals | "Someone to Love" | Nominated | |
| 1998 | Billboard Music Awards | Top R&B Artist | Jon B. | Nominated | |
| 1998 | Billboard Music Awards | Top R&B Artists – Male | Jon B. | Nominated | |
| 1998 | Billboard Music Awards | Top Hot R&B Single | "They Don't Know"/"Are U Still Down" | Nominated | |
| 1998 | Billboard Music Awards | Top Hot R&B Singles Artists | Jon B. | Nominated | |
| 1998 | Billboard Music Awards | Top Hot R&B Singles Artists – Male | Jon B. | Nominated | |
| 1998 | Billboard Music Awards | Top Hot R&B Singles Sales | "They Don't Know"/"Are U Still Down" | Nominated | |
| 1999 | Soul Train Music Awards | Best R&B/Soul Single – Male | "They Don't Know"/"Are U Still Down" | Nominated | |

== Other honors ==
On January 15, 2016, Rep. Carlos E. Tobon and Mayor Don Grebien presented Jon B. with a state citation and a key to the City of Pawtucket.
