= 550 Music =

Unit of Sony Music Entertainment

- Parent company: Sony Music
- Founded: 1992 or 1993
- Defunct: 2000
- Status: Defunct
- Distributor: Epic Records (in the United States)
- Genre: Various
- Country of origin: U.S.
- Location: New York City, New York
- Official website: epicrecords.com

550 Music (originally known as Sony 550 Music) was a record label and subsidiary imprint of Sony Music, operating through Sony Music's Epic Records division. The name was inspired by the address of then Sony Tower at 550 Madison Avenue in New York City.

From its launch in September or October 1993, Polly Anthony served as its general manager. Local rock band Eve's Plum was its first signing, among six more acts. Anthony became its president in 1994. Through the efforts of Alan McGee that year, it hosted Velvet Crush's debut album Teenage Symphonies to God (1994), with the single "Hold Me Up", after the band's earlier work with McGee's Creation Records.

John Doelp was its vice president. "[W]e didn't try to go out and get the biggest stars", he recalled. But by 1995 the label had featured work by Celine Dion and Des'ree, among others. In 1997, he told Billboard magazine that they hadn't "gotten to the moon yet".

As co-executive producer of Dion's album Let's Talk About Love (1997), he described her desire to push past creative limitations. 550's marketing strategy for Dion was global and collaboration-oriented. She praised their efforts, saying that collaborators were "knocking ... because there are magnificent people surrounding me". The label commissioned producer David Foster, songwriter Linda Thompson, and co-writer Walter Afanasieff to create the Streisand–Dion duet "Tell Him".

As part of a plan to renew Jon Secada's career, 550 hosted his 2000 album Better Part of Me and cut a deal with Loews Cineplex Entertainment to feature a music video of the album's single "Stop".

Epic began consolidating 550's business operations in 2000, as Tommy Mottola left Sony Music.

== Artists on label ==
- 3 Lb. Thrill
- Amel Larrieux
- Apollo 440
- Ben Folds Five
- Bolt Upright
- Carl Hancock Rux
- Celine Dion
- Coco Lee
- Deep Forest
- Des'ree
- Echolyn
- Eve's Plum
- Fear of Pop
- Flop
- For Squirrels
- Fuel
- George Clinton & the P.Funk All-Stars
- Ginuwine
- Haley Bennett
- Infectious Grooves
- Jon B.
- Mandy Moore
- Men of Vizion
- Mista Grimm
- moe.
- Nine Days
- No-Man
- Patra
- Social Distortion
- Taja Sevelle
- Tanto Metro & Devonte
- The Poor
- Ultimate Fakebook
- Vallejo
- Velvet Crush
- Verbow
- Vernon Reid
- Vonda Shepard

== See also ==
- List of record labels
