= Bobby V discography =

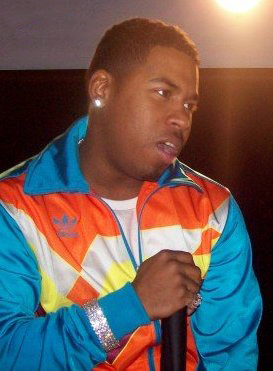
- Bobby V performing in 2006
- Studio albums: 6
- Extended plays: 2
- Soundtrack albums: 1
- Singles: 20
- Mixtapes: 4
- Guest appearances: 30
- Collaborative albums: 1

The discography of American singer Bobby V consists of 6 studio albums, 2 extended plays, 1 soundtrack album, and 20 singles.

== Albums ==
=== Studio albums ===
List of studio albums, with selected chart positions and certifications
Title	Album details	Peak chart positions				Certifications
Title	Album details	US	US R&B	FRA	UK	Certifications
Disturbing tha Peace Presents Bobby Valentino	Released: April 26, 2005; Label: Disturbing tha Peace, Def Jam; Formats: CD, LP, digital download	3	1	74	34	RIAA: Gold; BPI: Gold
Special Occasion	Released: May 8, 2007; Label: Disturbing tha Peace, Def Jam; Formats: CD, LP, digital download	3	1	—	68	
The Rebirth	Released: February 10, 2009; Label: Blu Kolla Dreams, EMI; Formats: CD, LP, digital download	7	1	—	—	
Fly on the Wall	Released: March 22, 2011; Label: Blu Kolla Dreams, Capitol; Formats: CD, LP, digital download	9	4	—	—	
Dusk Till Dawn	Released: October 16, 2012; Label: Blu Kolla Dreams, E1; Formats: CD, LP, digital download	91	12	—	—	
Electrik	Released: March 9, 2018; Label: SRG, Universal; Formats: CD, digital download	—	—	—	—	
"—" denotes a recording that did not chart or was not released in that territory.

=== Extended plays ===
List of extended plays, with selected chart positions
Title	Album details	Peak chart positions	
Title	Album details	US	US R&B
Come with Me	Released: March 2, 2008; Label: Veltre Records, Easy Love Ent.; Formats: CD, LP, digital download	—	—
Peach Moon	Released: December 10, 2013; Label: Blu Kolla Dreams; Formats: CD, LP, digital download	—	—

=== Collaboration albums ===
List of albums, with selected chart positions
Title	Album details	Peak chart positions	
Title	Album details	US	US R&B
The Next of Both Worlds (with Stix)	Released: October 7, 2005; Label: Brand7music; Formats: CD, LP, digital download	—	—

=== Soundtrack albums ===
List of soundtrack albums, with selected chart positions
Title	Album details	Peak chart positions	
Title	Album details	US	US R&B
Hollywood Hearts	Released: October 7, 2016; Label: Blu Kolla Dreams; Format: Digital download	—	—

=== Mixtapes ===
List of mixtapes
Title	Album details
The Rebirth Mixtape	Released: 2009; Label: Self-released; Formats: CD, digital download
60 Minutes Mixtape	Released: April 6, 2010; Label: Blu Kolla; Formats: CD, digital download
Vitamin V	Release: December 20, 2011; Label: Blu Kolla; Formats: CD, digital download
V Day	Release: February 14, 2012; Label: Blu Kolla; Formats: CD, digital download

== Singles ==
=== As lead artist ===
List of singles, with selected chart positions, showing year released and album name
Title	Year	Peak chart positions			Certifications	Album
Title	Year	US	US R&B	UK	Certifications	Album
"Slow Down"	2005	8	1	4	RIAA: Gold; BPI: Platinum	Disturbing tha Peace Presents Bobby Valentino
"Tell Me"	2005	51	13	38		Disturbing tha Peace Presents Bobby Valentino
"My Angel (Never Leave You)"	2005	—	—	—		Disturbing tha Peace Presents Bobby Valentino
"Turn the Page"	2006	—	63	—		Special Occasion
"Anonymous" (featuring Timbaland)	2007	49	17	25		Special Occasion
"Beep" (featuring Yung Joc)	2008	55	6	—		The Rebirth
"Hands on Me"	2009	—	56	—		The Rebirth
"Phone #" (featuring Plies)	2010	—	51	—		Fly on the Wall
"Words"	2010	—	23	—		Fly on the Wall
"Rock Wit' Cha"	2011	—	—	—		Fly on the Wall
"Grab Somebody" (featuring Twista)	2011	—	70	—		Fly on the Wall
"Mirror" (featuring Lil Wayne)	2012	—	49	—		Dusk Till Dawn
"Put It In" (featuring K. Michelle)	2012	—	—	—		Dusk Till Dawn
"Back to Love"	2013	—	—	—		Peach Moon EP
"Hollywood Hearts"	2016	—	—	—		Hollywood Hearts
"Lil Bit" (featuring Snoop Dogg)	2018	—	—	—		Electrik
"Love Me Slow"	2018	—	30	—		Electrik
"King Me"	2018	—	—	—		Non-album single
"Everybody"	2019	—	—	—		Non-album single
"Cookie"	2022	—	—	—		Non-album single
"—" denotes a recording that did not chart or was not released in that territory.

=== As featured artist ===
List of singles, with selected chart positions and certifications, showing year released and album name
Title	Year	Peak chart positions						Certifications	Album
Title	Year	US	US R&B	US Rap	AUS	NZ	UK	Certifications	Album
"Pimpin' All Over the World" (Ludacris featuring Bobby Valentino)	2005	9	5	2	28	—	—		The Red Light District
"Gimme Dat" (Chingy featuring Ludacris and Bobby Valentino)	2008	—	—	—	—	—	—		Hate It or Love It
"Mrs. Officer" (Lil Wayne featuring Bobby Valentino and Kidd Kidd)	2008	16	5	2	—	12	57	RIAA: 2× Platinum; BPI: Silver; RIANZ: Gold	Tha Carter III
"Payow!" (Huey featuring Juelz Santana and Bobby Valentino)	2009	—	88	—	—	—	—		Non-album single
"#1 Side Chick" (Willy Northpole featuring Bobby Valentino)	2009	—	—	—	—	—	—		Tha Connect
"I'm So Gone (Patron)" (Chamillionaire featuring Bobby Valentino)	2009	—	—	—	—	—	—		Venom
"Can't Remember" (Playaz Circle featuring Bobby V)	2009	—	85	—	—	—	—		Flight 360: The Takeoff
"Cover Girl" (JD Era featuring Bobby V)	2011	—	—	—	—	—	—		Th1rth3n
"I Need a Girl" (Gotti featuring Bobby V)	2015	—	—	—	—	—	—		Non-album single
"Sucka 4 Luv" (Lil Scrappy featuring Bobby V)	2016	—	—	—	—	—	—		Non-album single

== Guest appearances ==
List of non-single guest appearances, with other performing artists, showing year released and album name
Title	Year	Other artist(s)	Album
"Living the Life"	2005	Notorious B.I.G., Snoop Dogg, Ludacris, Faith Evans, Cheri Dennis	Duets: The Final Chapter
"Table Dance"	2005	Smoke, Lil Fate	Ludacris Presents: Disturbing tha Peace
"Take It Slow"	2006	Shawnna, Ludacris	Block Music
"Sorry Baby"	2006	Field Mob	Light Poles and Pine Trees
"Hey Babe"	2006	Shareefa	Point of No Return
"International"	2007	Guru	Jazzmatazz, Vol. 4: The Hip-Hop Jazz Messenger: Back to the Future
"End of the Night"	2007	Ludacris	Release Therapy
"Tears"	2007	Tru-Life	Breathin Aint Enough
"Coast to Coast"	2007	Young Chris	Now or Never
"Look at Her" (R&B Remix)	2007	One Chance, Trey Songz, Lloyd	—N/a
"Let's Go" (Remix)	2007	Lil Fate	Strength In Numbers
"Pepsi Smash All Star Mic Pass"	2007	T-Pain, Huey, Yung Joc, B.o.B, Twista, Mike Jones, Sammie, Unk, Kardinal Official	—N/a
"You"	2007	Willie the Kid	Absolute Greatness
"Kidnapping Your Love"	2009	Emilio	White Men Can't Rap
"Rocking With The Best"	2009	Jadakiss, Pharrell	The Last Kiss
"W"	2009	—N/a	Mya and Friends Presents... Best of Both Worlds
"Might Not Be"	2009	—N/a	Mya and Friends Presents... Best of Both Worlds
"Who Can Love U"	2009	Lil Boosie	Superbad: The Return of Boosie Bad Azz
"Everything"	2009	Juvenile	Cocky & Confident
"Sex in Crazy Places"	2009	Gucci Mane, Nicki Minaj, Trina	The State vs. Radric Davis
"Last Call"	2009	Hurricane Chris	Unleashed
"Do Dat"	2010	OJ da Juiceman	O.R.A.N.G.E.
"Stilettos & Jeans"	2010	E-40	Revenue Retrievin': Night Shift
"Got Plenty Money"	2010	Shawty Lo	Bowen Homes Carlos
"Sex in the Lounge"	2012	Nicki Minaj, Lil Wayne	Pink Friday: Roman Reloaded
"Nothin On Me"	2012	JNan	Fast Food
"Have It All"	2012	V.I.C.	Revenge of the Beast
"Doing It Big"	2012	Pharoah	Play 2 Play
"Everything About You"	2013	Rich Boy	Break the Pot
"Don't Have a Chance"	2013	Gucci Mane	World War 3: Lean
"Against All Odds"	2015	Waka Flocka Flame, Gucci Mane	The Turn Up Godz Tour
