= Tim & Bob production discography =

This is a list of songs produced by Tim & Bob.

== Singles produced ==
- "Come See Me Feat Mr. Cheeks" by 112
- "Get It Up" by TLC
- "Ghetto Romance" by Damage
- "I'm Gonna Be" by Donell Jones
- "Take Care of Home" by Dave Hollister
- "Slow Down" by Bobby Valentino
- "So Into You" by Tamia
- "Tell Me" by Bobby Valentino
- "They Don't Know" by Jon B.
- "Thong Song" by Sisqó
- "Used To Be My Girl" by Brian McKnight

== 0-9 ==
- "24 Hours" by Daniel DeBourg
- "3 Is The New 2" by Bobby Valentino
- "50 Candles" by Boyz II Men
- "99 Bottles Of Beer On The Wall" by Nas

== A ==
- "A Melody" by Eternal
- "Again" by Brian McKnight
- "All I Wanna Do" by The Black Eyed Peas
- "All My Love" by Chantay Savage
- 'All Night" by Donell Jones
- "Always Good" by The Isley Brothers
- "Are You Ready" by Bobby Valentino
- "Are You Ready For My Love" by Destiny's Child
- "As Far As My Eyes Can See" by Daniel DeBourg

== B ==
- "Baby" by Destiny's Child
- "Baby, Baby, Baby, Baby" (Remix) by R. Kelly
- "Bad Girl" by Jon B.
- "Beautiful Sexy Girl" by Vega
- "Been Around The World" by Bobby Brown
- "Being With You" by Soul for Real
- "Best Friend" by Mary J. Blige
- "Book Of Love" by Daniel DeBourg

== C ==
- "Can I Touch You" by 112
- "Can We Talk (Remix)" by Tevin Campbell
- "Can You Handle All Of Me" by Coko
- "Can't Leave You Alone" by Brian McKnight
- "Can't Take It" by Jesse Powell
- "Can't Wait" by Donell Jones
- "Can't Wait Till Later" by Bobby Valentino
- "Caught Up" by 112
- "Cherry Pie" by Jennifer Lopez
- "Come Closer" by Puff Johnson
- "Come Over Girl" by Jersey Ave
- "Come Over" by Sandra St. Victor
- "Come Touch Me" by Bobby Valentino
- "Conversate" by Case
- "Could've Been You" by Deborah Cox
- "Curious" by Bobby Valentino

== D ==
- "Deja Vu" by Case
- "Destiny" by Dave Hollister
- "Do You Remember" by Tank
- "Do You Think Of Me" by Willa Ford
- "Don't Ask My Neighbor" by JS
- "Don't Go" by Deitrick Haddon
- "Don't Make Me Wait" by Daniel DeBourg
- "Don't Think They Know" by Chris Brown
- "Don't Turn Away" by The Isley Brothers
- "Don't Wanna Argue" by Donell Jones
- "Don't Worry Bout A Thing" by Daniel DeBourg
- "Don't Leave Me Lonely" by Damita

== E ==
- "Even Though" by Case
- "Every Time You Come Around" by Bobby V
- "Excited" by Avant

== F ==
- "Feelin' You" by Donell Jones
- "Flowers" by Daniel DeBourg
- "Forever by Bobby Brown
- "Forever" by J. Lewis
- "For The Longest Time" by 112
- "Freaks Come Out" by Bobby V
- "Freaky" by Bobby V

== G ==
- "Get Mine" by Dalvin DeGrate
- "Get To Know Me Feat Nas" by Joe
- "Get To Know You Better" by Q. Parker of 112
- "Girl Got It Going On" by Another Bad Creation
- "Give It To You" by Daniel DeBourg
- "Give Me A Chance Feat Ludacris" by Bobby Valentino
- "Give Me Your Heart" by Bobby Valentino
- "Gonna Give You What You Need" by Tyrese
- "Gotta Have It" by Elusion
- "Gratitude" by Avant

== H ==
- "Heaven" by Lionel Richie
- "Here We Go Again" by Bobby V
- "Hold Me" by Earth, Wind & Fire
- "Hold On To His Hand" by Puff Johnson
- "Hot" by Bobby V
- "Hurry" by TGT

== I ==
- "I Already Know" by Nas
- "I'll Be Right There" by Karen Clark Sheard
- "I Can't Get Enough" by Bobby Valentino
- "I Can't Help It" by Dalvin DeGrate
- "I Can't Wait" by Tank
- "I Care" by Shanice Wilson
- "I Don't Wanna Be Grown Up" by Another Bad Creation
- "I Don't Wanna Fight (Remix)" by Tina Turner
- "If You Belong To Me" by Lionel Richie
- "If You Only Knew" by Mýa
- "I'll Be Right There" by Karen Clark Sheard
- "I'll Be There" by Shanice Wilson
- "I'll Forgive You" by Bobby Valentino
- 'I'll Give You Anything" by RL
- I'll Make Love To You (remix collection) by Boyz II Men
- "I'll Wait Right Here" by Jersey Ave
- "I, Love" by Jennifer Lopez
- "I'm Gonna Be Feat The Clipse (Remix)" by Donell Jones
- "I'm Sorry (My Favorite Girl)" by Dave Hollister
- "Impossible" by Musiq Soulchild
- "In The Night [Freaks Come Out]" by Bobby Valentino
- "In The Mood" by Athena Cage
- "In The Morning" by Daniel DeBourg
- "It Takes A Man" by Athena Cage
- "I Remember" by Boyz II Men
- "I Want Cha" by Perfect Gentlemen
- "I Want That" by The Isley Brothers
- "I Want You Feat Ray J" by 40 Da Great
- "I Want You More" by Kevon Edmonds
- "I Was Wrong" by Bobby Valentino
- "I Wish" by Hilary Duff
- "I've Been Waiting" by Tamia

== J ==
- "Just A Little While" by 112
- "Just Because Your Hot" by Coko
- "Just Like You" by Mary J. Blige
- "Just The Way You Like It" by Deborah Cox

== K ==
- "Keep It Movin" by MC Lyte
- "Khalil Interlude" by Boyz II Men

== L ==
- "Laurel (My Dream Girl)" by 112
- "Leave Me Alone Feat Heavy D" by Athena Cage
- "Let Yourself Go" by Daniel DeBourg
- "Let's Make Love" by 112
- "Let Me Know" by Athena Cage
- "Let's Take A Dip" by A Few Good Men
- "Let's Stay Together" by Destiny's Child
- "Let's Stay Together" by Soul for Real
- "Life Is Good" Jamie Foxx
- "Like You" by Avant
- "Long Day" by Dalvin DeGrate
- "Love Dream" by Bobby Valentino
- 'Love Led Me To You by RL
- "Love Me Again" by Babyface
- "Loving You" by Tamia
- "Lost In You" by Tank

== M ==
- "Made For Me" Daniel DeBourg
- "Make You The Only One" by Bobby Valentino
- "Malibu Dre" by Dr. Dre
- "Mista Valentino" by Bobby Valentino
- "Miss Your Kiss" by Tamar Braxton
- "Missing You" by Case
- "Missing You" by Joe
- "My Angel (Never Leave You)" by Bobby Valentino
- "My First Kiss" by Another Bad Creation
- "My Place" by Bobby Brown
- "My World" by Daniel DeBourg

== N ==
- "Need It" by Tank
- "Never Did It Before" by Hev D Heavy D
- "Never Lonely" by Bobby Valentino
- "Not My Girl" by Dalvin DeGrate
- "Not Your Friend" by Case
- "Now I'm Gone" by Monica
- "Now Or Later" by Musiq Soulchild
- "Now That I'm With You" by Jon B.
- "Now That We're Done" by 112

== O ==
- "On The Edge" by Bobby Valentino
- "One Girl To Love" by Bobby Valentino
- "One More Try" by Another Bad Creation
- "Only Human" by Bobby Valentino
- "On My Level" by Snoop Dogg
- "One Night" by Mýa

== P ==
- "Pillow" by Willa Ford
- 'Pillow Talk" by Eternal
- "Pretty Woman" by The Isley Brothers

== Q ==
- "Quick Fast" by Bobby Valentino

== R ==
- "Rather Be Alone" by Jesse Powell
- "Ready For Your Love" by Earth, Wind & Fire
- "Really Need You" by Daniel DeBourg
- "Religious Love" by R. Kelly
- "Remind Me Of Something" (Remix) by R. Kelly
- "Reminds Me Of You" by Day26
- "Reveal My Heart" by Deitrick Haddon
- "Right Here With Me" by JS
- "Right There" by Bobby Valentino
- "Round and Round" by Monica
- "Run Away" by Musiq Soulchild

== S ==
- "Say" by JS
- "Second Chance" by 112
- "Sex Games" by Case
- "Sexy Girl" by Bobby Valentino
- "Shadow" by Daniel DeBourg
- "Shake It Up" by Bobby Valentino
- "Shorty You Know" by Jersey Ave
- "Should I Stay?" by Joe
- "Shoulda Been Lovin You (Remix)" by Brian McKnight
- "Slowly" by Boyz II Men
- "Smile" by 112
- "Smile" by Bobby Valentino
- "So Amazing" by Boyz II Men
- "So Beautiful" by Joe
- "So Good To Be In Love" by Deitrick Haddon
- "Soon As I Get Home" by Bobby Valentino
- "Sorry" by Tyrese
- "Special Occasion" by Bobby Valentino
- "Superstar" by Tank
- "Sweet Design" by Sia

== T ==
- "Take Care of Me" by Chanté Moore
- "Take It Out On Me" by Athena Cage
- "Tears" by Damage
- "Tell Me" by Bobby V
- "Tell Me" by Destiny's Child
- "Tell Me If You Still Care" by Monica
- "Tell Me Something Good" by Daniel Debourg
- "Tell the World" by Daniel DeBourg
- "Tender" by Willa Ford
- "Thank God For the Disco" by Willa Ford
- "Thank You Lord" by Bobby Valentino
- "That's What I Like" by Joe
- "They Don't Know" by Chris Brown
- "Therapist" by Bobby Valentino
- "Think of Me" by Day26
- "Thinkin' Bout You" by J. Lewis
- "Time" by Monica
- 'Time Will Tell" by David Hollister
- "Tonight" by Daniel DeBourg
- "Tonight" by Tamar Braxton
- "Touch Me" by Bobby V
- "Touch My Body" by Jennifer Lopez
- "Trying Times" by Boyz II Men
- "Turn Off The Lights" by The Game
- "Turned Away" by Chantay Savage
- "Turn You Out" by Athena Cage

== U ==
- "Unhappy Without You" by Brian McKnight

== V ==
- "Vibin" by Boyz II Men
- "Vibin (Remix Nu Flava)" by Boyz II Men
- "Vitamin D" by Ludacris

== W ==
- "Watching You" by Athena Cage
- "Waiting for You" by J. Lewis
- "Want You to Know Me" by Bobby Valentino
- "Way It Goes" by Athena Cage
- "Wet" by Sandra St. Victor
- "We've Come Too Far" by Dave Hollister
- "When I'm With You" by Kevon Edmonds
- "When It Comes to Me" by Chanté Moore
- "When The Lights Go Off" by Joe
- "Why" by 112
- "Why?" by Bobby Valentino
- "Wish I Never Met You" by Athena Cage
- "Will You Be There" by Boyz II Men
- "With You" by Monica
- "Without You" by Donell Jones
- "Woman In Me" by Monica
- "Words" by Támar
- "Work It Out" by Babyface

== Y ==
- "Ya Game Ain't Game" by Kelly Price
- "Yearning" by Puff Johnson
- "You" by Athena Cage
- "You And Me" by Bobby Valentino
- "You Don't Know" by Tamar Braxton
- "You Gotta Get Down" by Monica
- "You Know" by Boyz II Men
- "Your Face" by Avant
- "Your Room" by Tamar Braxton
- "You're My Star" by The Isley Brothers
- "You're Not Alone" by Bobby Valentino

== Album productions (5 or more tracks) ==
- 1993: 5 A.M. - Self Titled
- 1993: Monica - Miss Thang
- 1994: Boyz II Men - ll
- 1995: Boyz II Men - Remix Collection
- 1995: 112 - Self Titled
- 2000: Tamar Braxton - Self Titled
- 2000: Dalvin DeGrate - Met.a.mor.phic.
- 2001: Athena Cage - Self Titled
- 2001: Case - Open Letter
- 2001: Jersey Ave - Self Titled
- 2002: Daniel DeBourg - Tell the World
- 2005: Bobby V - Self Titled
- 2006: Brian McKnight - Ten
- 2006: Donell Jones - Journey of a Gemini
- 2006: Deitrick Haddon - 7 Days
- 2007: Bobby V - Special Occasion
- 2008: Damita Haddon - No Looking Back
- 2009: Bobby V - The Rebirth
- 2011: Bobby V - Fly on the Wall
- 2011: Boyz II Men - Twenty
