= Bobby Valentino =

Bobby Valentino may refer to:

- Bobby Valentino (American singer) (born Robert Wilson, 1980), now known as Bobby V
  - Bobby Valentino (album), his 2005 debut album
- Bobby Valentino (British musician) (born James Beckingham), English violinist, songwriter and singer

== See also ==
- Bobby Valentín, Puerto Rican singer
- Bobby Valentine, baseball player and manager
