= The Rebirth =

Studio album by Bobby V
- Released: February 10, 2009
- Length: 64:26
- Labels: Blu Kolla Dreams; EMI
- Producers: Leland "Big Fruit" Clopton; Jevon Hill; Bill Jabr; Los da Mystro; Raphael Saadiq; Tim & Bob; Rondeau "Duke" Williams

Bobby V chronology
| Come with Me (2008) | The Rebirth (2009) | Fly on the Wall (2011) |

Singles from The Rebirth
- 1. "Beep" Released: September 30, 2008; 2. "Hands On Me" Released: January 20, 2009

The Rebirth is the third studio album by American R&B singer Bobby V. it was released on February 10, 2009, marking his first album released through his own Blu Kolla Dreams label. Following limited support from Disturbing tha Peace, Bobby V pursued a more mature, relationship-focused direction for The Rebirth, with production from Los da Mystro, Raphael Saadiq, Big Fruit, and longtime collaborators Tim & Bob. He co-wrote most of the album's tracks and made his debut as a producer on several tracks, including "Make You Say" and "Another Life."

The album received mixed reviews, with critics praising its polished contemporary R&B production and Bobby V's confident delivery while criticizing his songwriting, vocal limitations, and lack of consistency. The album debuted at number seven on the US Billboard 200 with 64,000 first-week sales and topped the Top R&B/Hip-Hop Albums, marking Valentino's third consecutive album to reach number one on the chart. The Rebirth produced two singles, including "Beep," which peaked at number six on the Hot R&B/Hip-Hop Songs chart, becoming his Bobby V's highest-charting single since "Slow Down" (2005).

== Background ==
In May 2007, Bobby V released his second studio album Special Occasion. The album earned mixed to positive reviews from music critics, debuted at number 3 on the US Billboard 200, and ultimately sold approximately 270,000 copies in the United States. Following what he considered limited support from his then-labels, Disturbing tha Peace and Def Jam Recordings, Bobby reassessed his career and pursued a more mature musical direction for his next album, The Rebirth, which focused on relationships and featured production from Los da Mystro, Raphael Saadiq, Big Fruit, and longtime collaborators Tim & Bob. The album was initially titled Underground Love.

The album's lead single, "Beep" featuring Yung Joc, was released through iTunes on October 7, 2008. The song's strong early reception led Bobby V to view it as a statement of his return to music and a reflection of the album's more mature themes. He also collaborated with Saadiq on "Just Me & You", a reworking of Saadiq's 1991 song of the same name, with Bobby V rewriting the verses while Saadiq contributed live horns and guitar. Longtime collaborators Tim & Bob produced "3 Is the New 2", a Jodeci-influenced track built around the idea of "30 is the new 20." Other songs included "Hands on Me", which explores the temptation to remain faithful in a relationship, the mid-tempo ballad "Butterfly Tattoo", featuring an '80s-inspired Prince influence, and "Give Me Your Heart", a gospel-influenced ballad. The album also marked Bobby V's debut as a producer on "Make You Say", a track inspired by the hook he wrote and performed on Lil Wayne's "Mrs. Officer".

== Critical reception ==
Professional ratings
Review scores
| Source | Rating |
|---|---|
| About.com | 2.5/5 stars |
| AllMusic | 3/5 stars |
| Artistdirect | 3/5 stars |
| Robert Christgau | (dud) |
| Entertainment Weekly | C− |
| HipHopDX | 2.5/5 stars |

AllMusic editor Anthony Tognazzini found that The Rebirth "offers up another dose of svelte, contemporary R&B [...] V. worked with producers Tim & Bob and Carlos McKinney on this set, keeping things up to date with the polished and sleekly digitized sound common in 21st-century R&B. He delivers on bedroom ballads and mid-tempo jams, both of which he carries off with suave, sexy vocal assurance. The Rebirth is in the same mold as Valentino’s first two releases, but fans of those albums will find plenty to savor here." The San Diego Union-Tribune remarked that "most of the tracks keep a slow-paced tempo, as Valentino strides successfully on most of them. Hillary Brown of Artistdirect viewed The Rebirth as a continuation rather than a reinvention, praising its romantic material, and polished production. She nevertheless felt that Bobby V had yet to fully realize his potential, though the album showed promise.

Mark Edward Nero of About.com gave The Rebirth a mixed review, praising tracks such as "Butterfly Tattoo," Bobby V's cover of "Just Me and You," and "3 Is the New 2," while noting that his improved vocals and more R&B-focused direction were offset by limited charisma, inconsistent vocal control, and uneven material. L. Michael Gipson from SoulTracks wrote: "Never consistent with tunes designed for young urban radio, Valentino’s team clearly believes lyrical repetition is the key to good songcraft and nasal auto-tuned vocals, iconic singing. Still, there are hits to be had here." Mark Edward Nero of About.com praised a few standout tracks but criticized the album's weak vocals and lack of charisma, concluding that his vocal limitations overshadowed its progress as an R&B project. Meka Udoh from HipHopDX found that "while The Rebirth has its moments, Valentino’s sub-par pen game is what proves to be his greatest downfall, turning otherwise notable singles into quickly forgotten stanzas. Perhaps if paired with gifted songwriters Bobby could push over the tipping point and into superstardom, but it unfortunately won’t happen with this album." Entertainment Weekly gave The Rebirth a C− rating.

== Chart performance ==
The Rebirth debuted at number seven on the US Billboard 200 in the week of February 18, 2009, selling 64,000 copies in its first week. It also debuted at number one on the Top R&B/Hip-Hop Albums chart, becoming Valentino's third consecutive album to do so. Billboard ranked the album 46th on its Top R&B/Hip-Hop Albums Year-End 2009 chart.

== Track listing ==
The Rebirth track listing
| No. | Title | Writer(s) | Producer(s) | Length |
|---|---|---|---|---|
| 1. | "The Rebirth" (featuring Dottie Peoples) | Bobby Wilson; Jevon Hill | Hill | 1:16 |
| 2. | "Make You the Only One" | Tim Kelley; Bob Robinson; Wilson | Tim & Bob | 4:23 |
| 3. | "Hands on Me" | Wilson; Hill; Carlos McKinney; Natalie Walker; F. Fluerimond; Jerrett Washington | Los da Mystro | 4:18 |
| 4. | "My Girl" | Wilson; Hill | Hill | 3:50 |
| 5. | "Butterfly Tattoo" | Wilson; Hill; McKinney; Walker; Fluerimond; Washington | Los da Mystro | 3:58 |
| 6. | "Just Me & You" (featuring Raphael Saadiq) | Saadiq; Wilson | Saadiq | 3:53 |
| 7. | "Beep" (featuring Yung Joc) | Jasiel Robinson; Wilson; Leland Clopton; Courtney Stewart | Leland "Big Fruit" Clapton | 4:10 |
| 8. | "3 Is the New 2" | Kelley; B. Robinson; Wilson | Tim & Bob | 4:38 |
| 9. | "Make You Say" | Wilson; Bill Jabr | Bobby V; Jabr | 4:02 |
| 10. | "Be My Love" | Wilson; Hill; Daen Simmons; Jeremy McIntyre | Hill | 4:10 |
| 11. | "Dance the Night Away" (Interlude) | Wilson; Hill; McIntyre | Hill | 1:43 |
| 12. | "On the Edge" | Kelley; B. Robinson; Wilson | Tim & Bob | 4:11 |
| 13. | "You're Not Alone" | Kelley; B. Robinson; Wilson | Tim & Bob | 4:28 |
| 14. | "Stay With Me" | Wilson; Michelle Taylor; Rondeau Williams | Williams | 4:30 |
| 15. | "Another Life" | Wilson; Bill Jabr | Bobby V; Jabr | 6:08 |
| 16. | "Give Me Your Heart" | Kelley; B. Robinson; Wilson | Tim & Bob | 4:40 |
| Total length: | | | | 64:26 |

iTunes bonus track
| No. | Title | Writer(s) | Producer(s | Length |
|---|---|---|---|---|
| 17. | "Your Smile" (featuring Lil Wayne) | Kelley; B. Robinson; Wilson; Dwayne Carter, Jr. | Tim & Bob | 4:29 |

Japan bonus track
| No. | Title | Writer(s) | Producer(s | Length |
|---|---|---|---|---|
| 18. | "Why?" | Kelley; B. Robinson; Wilson | Tim & Bob | 4:26 |

== Charts ==
=== Weekly charts ===
Weekly chart performance for The Rebirth
| Chart (2009) | Peak position |
|---|---|
| US Billboard 200 | 7 |
| US Top R&B/Hip-Hop Albums (Billboard) | 1 |

=== Year-end charts ===
Year-end chart performance for The Rebirth
| Chart (2009) | Position |
|---|---|
| US Top R&B/Hip-Hop Albums (Billboard) | 46 |

== Release history ==
The Rebirth release history
| Region | Date | Format | Label | Ref(s) |
|---|---|---|---|---|
| Various | February 10, 2009 | CD; Digital download | Blu Kolla Dreams | |
