= I Need an Angel (disambiguation) =

"I Need An Angel" is a song written by R. Kelly, covered by Ruben Studdard

I Need An Angel may also refer to:

- I Need an Angel (album), by Ruben Studdard
- "I Need an Angel", song by Barbara Orbison
- "I Need an Angel", song by Blue Murder from Nothin' But Trouble 1993
