= Phone number (disambiguation) =

A phone number is a sequence of digits assigned to a telephone.

Phone number may also refer to:

- "Phone #", a song by Bobby V featuring Plies from Fly on the Wall, 2011
- "Phone Numbers", a single by Dominic Fike, 2019
