= Flight 360: The Takeoff =

Studio album by Playaz Circle
- Released: June 23, 2009
- Recorded: 2007–09
- Studio: DB Studios (College Park, GA); Upstairs Studio (Atlanta, GA); KY Recordings; Trak Meet Studios (St. Louis, MO); Milk Money Consulting; Solitaire Studios
- Genre: Hip hop
- Length: 52:38
- Label: Disturbing tha Peace; Def Jam
- Producer: Chaka Zulu (exec.); Jeff Dixon (exec.); Ludacris (exec.); Aktual; Big Hurt; Brandon Casey; Brian Casey; Clarence "Kage" Holmes; Crank King; Kidz With Machine Gunz; Korleone; Larry Love; LT Moe; T-Gunnz; The Royalty; The Trak Starz; Tombstone; Trouble Styles; Wonder Arillo

Playaz Circle chronology
Supply & Demand (2007)	Flight 360: The Takeoff (2009)

Singles from Flight 360: The Takeoff
- 1. "Stupid" Released: April 21, 2009; 2. "Hold Up" Released: September 15, 2009; 3. "Can't Remember" Released: February 4, 2010; 4. "Yeah We Gettin' Rich" Released: August 31, 2010; 5. "Big Dawg" Released: April 3, 2011

Professional ratings
Review scores
Source	Rating
AllMusic	3.5/5 stars
XXL	3/5

Flight 360: The Takeoff is the second and final studio album by American hip hop duo Playaz Circle. It was released on June 23, 2009, on Disturbing tha Peace/Def Jam Recordings. Recording sessions took place at DB Studios in College Park, at Upstairs Studio in Atlanta, at KY Recordings, at Trak Meet Studios in St. Louis, at Milk Money Consulting, and at Solitaire Studios. Production was handled by Big Hurt, Wonder Arillo, Aktual, Brandon Casey, Brian Casey, Clarence "Kage" Holmes, Crank King, Kidz With Machine Gunz, Korleone, Larry Love, LT Moe, T-Gunnz, The Royalty, The Trak Starz, Tombstone, and Trouble Styles, with Chaka Zulu, Jeff Dixon and Ludacris serving as executive producers. It features guest appearances from Brandon Casey, Brian Casey, Bobby Valentino, CeeLo Green, Lil Wayne, Ludacris, OJ Da Juiceman, Raekwon, Sunni Patterson, Young Dro, Ivory Weems, Dunlap Exclusive and Jay Rush.

The first official single from the album was "Stupid", released on iTunes. There are also music videos for the songs "Look What I Got", "Yeah We Gettin' Rich" featuring Ludacris, "Can't Remember" featuring Bobby V and the remix to "Big Dawg" featuring Lil' Wayne.

The album debuted at number 74 on the Billboard 200, number 11 on the Top R&B/Hip-Hop Albums and number 7 on the Top Rap Albums in the US. The song "Can't Remember" was a mild success reaching No. 85 on the Hot R&B/Hip-Hop Songs.

== Track listing ==
No.	Title	Writer(s)	Producer(s)	Length
1.	"Turbulence"	Earl Conyers; Tauheed Epps; Clarence Burgess; Gabriel 'Wonder' Arillo	Big Hurt	3:15
2.	"Look What I Got" (featuring Korleon)	Conyers; Epps; Madison Blackmon	Korleone; Tombstone	3:36
3.	"Stupid" (featuring OJ Da Juiceman and Dunlap Exclusive)	Conyers; Epps; Otis Williams, Jr.; Burgess	Big Hurt	4:11
4.	"Welcome Aboard" (featuring Ivory Weems)			0:30
5.	"Hold Up"	Conyers; Epps; Walter "Walt Deezy" Williams; Olivia Stevens	Kidz With Machine Gunz	3:31
6.	"Yeah We Gettin' Rich" (featuring Ludacris)	Conyers; Epps; Christopher Bridges; Clarence Holmes IV; David James Wolinski; Yvette Stevens	Clarence "Kage" Holmes	4:23
7.	"Can't Remember" (featuring Bobby Valentino)	Conyers; Epps; Bobby Wilson; Jesse Blake; John Oates	Aktual	2:47
8.	"Big Dawg" (featuring Lil' Wayne)	Conyers; Epps; Dwayne Carter; Arillo	Wonder Arillo	4:36
9.	"Quit Flossin'" (featuring Brian Casey and Brandon Casey)	Conyers; Epps; Brian Casey; Brandon Casey	DJ Quik & Scoop DeVille	3:52
10.	"Refreshments" (featuring Ivory Weems)			0:21
11.	"Big Wheel Whippin'"	Conyers; Epps; Thomas Lee Brown; Larry Woodson; Thomas Lumpkins	Crank King; Larry Love; T-Gunnz	4:30
12.	"Weight Droppin'" (featuring Raekwon and Jay Rush)	Conyers; Epps; Corey Woods; Arillo	Wonder Arillo	3:47
13.	"DJ Know Me" (featuring Young Dro)	Conyers; Epps; D'Juan Montrel Hart; Alonzo Lee Jr.; Shamar Daugherty; J. Tibbs	The Trak Starz; Trouble Styles	4:19
14.	"Ghetto" (featuring CeeLo Green and Sunni Patterson)	Conyers; Epps; Thomas Callaway; Sunni Patterson; Todd Daniel Moore	LT Moe	4:47
15.	"Prepare for Landing" (featuring Ivory Weems)			0:18
16.	"Outta Here"	Conyers; Epps; Christopher Jain; Tony Wyss	The Royalty	4:06
Total length:				52:38

== Charts ==
Chart performance for Flight 360: The Takeoff
Chart (2009)	Peak position
US Billboard 200	74
US Top R&B/Hip-Hop Albums (Billboard)	11
US Top Rap Albums (Billboard)	7
