= Duffle Bag Boy =

Single by Playaz Circle featuring Lil Wayne

from the album Supply & Demand
- Released: May 1, 2007
- Recorded: 2007
- Genre: Hip hop
- Length: 4:20
- Label: Disturbing tha Peace; Def Jam
- Songwriters: Playaz Circle; Dwayne Carter
- Producer: M16

Playaz Circle singles chronology
"Duffle Bag Boy" (2007)	"Betta Knock" (2007)

Lil Wayne singles chronology
"Speaker/9mm" (2007)	"Duffle Bag Boy" (2007)	"Uh-Ohhh!" (2007)

"Duffle Bag Boy" is a song by American hip hop duo Playaz Circle featuring Lil Wayne, released on May 7, 2007 as the former act's debut single, as well as the lead single from the duo's debut album, Supply & Demand (2007). The song was produced by M16 and Liam Kantwill. The song peaked at number 15 on the U.S. Billboard Hot 100, becoming the duo's only single to enter the chart.

== Music video ==
The music video was directed by Disturbing Tha Peace CEO Chaka Zulu and was played on BET's 106 & Park in June 2007. It begins with Tity Boi (aka 2 Chainz) getting up from bed for breakfast. He gets dressed and rides in a Lamborghini Gallardo, in which he picks up Lil Wayne, handing him a duffle bag. They then head to a concert. Meanwhile, Dolla Boy sells some CDs to a boy in exchange for a duffle bag, then receives a text message to meet Tity Boi and Lil Wayne. At the end of the video, all three of them are seen performing together.

== Remix versions ==
The official remix features rappers Birdman, Juelz Santana and a new verse from Lil Wayne (who only sang the song's chorus in the original version). At the 2007 BET Hip Hop Awards, Playaz Circle and Lil Wayne performed the song with a new guest verse from fellow rapper and DTP label-boss Ludacris.

Miami-based rapper Lil' Brianna, released a freestyle over the song's instrumental for her 2007 mixtape, Princess of Miami. UK rapper Kano, released a freestyle over the song's instrumental for his MC No. 1 mixtape. Other remixes include the Travis Barker and Sean P remixes. American rappers Rick Ross and Young Jeezy also have their own respective remixes.

== Charts ==
=== Weekly charts ===
Chart (2007)	Peak position
US Billboard Hot 100	15
US Hot R&B/Hip-Hop Songs (Billboard)	4
US Hot Rap Songs (Billboard)	2
US Rhythmic Airplay (Billboard)	7

=== Year-end charts ===
Chart (2007)	Position
US Hot R&B/Hip-Hop Songs (Billboard)	55
Chart (2008)	Position
US Hot R&B/Hip-Hop Songs (Billboard)	55

== Certifications ==
Region	Certification	Certified units/sales
United States (RIAA) Mastertone	Platinum	1,000,000^{*}
^{*} Sales figures based on certification alone.
