= Playaz Circle =

American hip hop duo

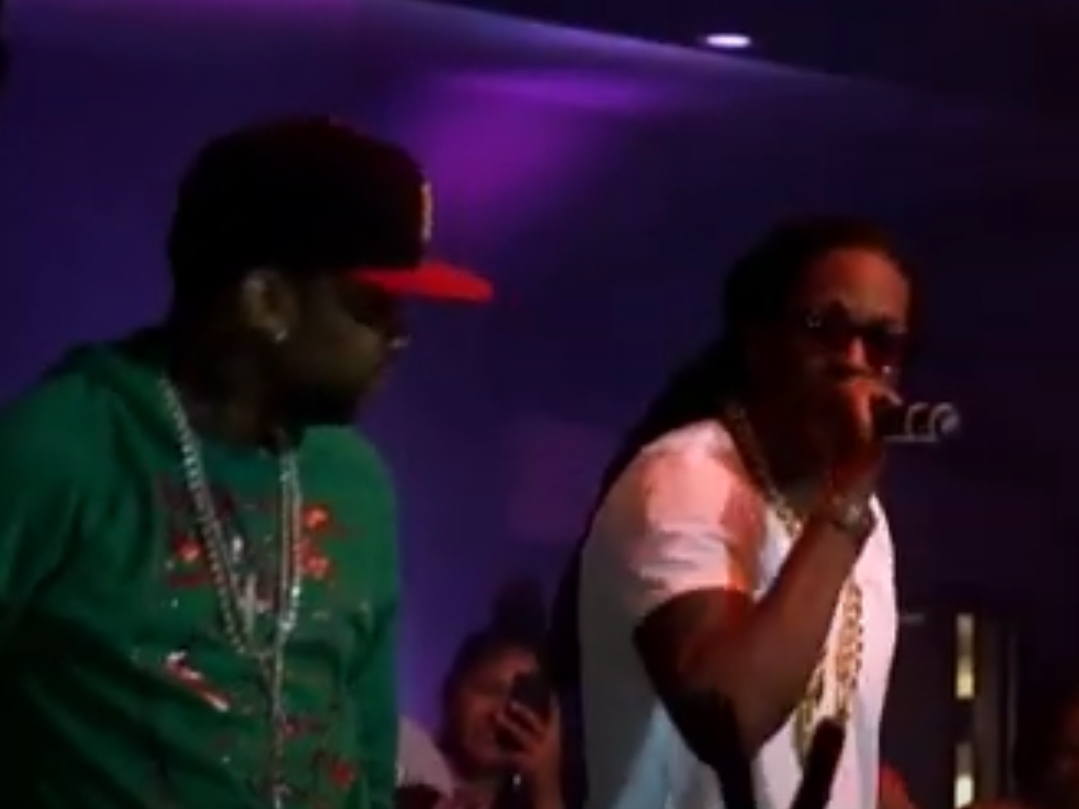
- Dolla Boy (left) and 2 Chainz (right) of Playaz Circle performing in 2013

Background information
- Origin: College Park, Georgia, U.S.
- Genres: Southern hip-hop
- Years active: 1997–2013
- Labels: Kokaine City; Disturbing tha Peace; Def Jam; Def Jam South
- Past members: 2 Chainz; Dolla Boy

Playaz Circle was an American Southern hip hop duo, formed in 1997 and composed of 2 Chainz and Dolla Boy – both of whom originate from College Park, Georgia. They signed with Ludacris' record label, Disturbing tha Peace, an imprint of Def Jam Recordings to release two albums: Supply & Demand (2007) and Flight 360: The Takeoff (2009). The former spawned the single "Duffle Bag Boy" (featuring Lil Wayne), their only song to enter the Billboard Hot 100; it peaked at number 15 on the chart.

== History ==
=== 1997–2010: Beginnings and debut album ===
The duo was formed in 1997 by childhood friends Tity Boi (later known as 2 Chainz) and Dolla Boy in College Park, Georgia. The duo put all their money together to release their independent album United We Stand, United We Fall. The album included features from Lil Fate, I-20 and others from the Disturbing tha Peace family. They were introduced to Ludacris by Lil Fate and soon became good friends.

Shortly after, Dolla Boy was incarcerated and Tity Boi was shot. As a result, no material was released from the duo until 2007. In January 2010, Playaz Circle filmed a music video for their single "Big Dawg" featuring Lil Wayne and Birdman at Studio Space Atlanta.

=== 2012–2013: Untitled project and disbandment ===
In late 2012 or early 2013, their two studio albums were removed from iTunes, most likely because of a copyright claim on the duo's name. In December 2013, 2 Chainz confirmed that he had been recently working with Dolla Boy and that the duo was planning to release another project together, although this has since failed to occur.

== Discography ==
=== Albums ===
List of albums, with selected chart positions
| Title | Album details | Peak chart positions | | |
| Title | Album details | U.S. | U.S. R&B /HH | U.S. Rap |
|---|---|---|---|---|
| Supply & Demand | Released: October 30, 2007; Label: Disturbing tha Peace, Def Jam; Format: CD, digital download | 27 | 3 | 1 |
| Flight 360: The Takeoff | Released: June 23, 2009; Label: Disturbing tha Peace, Def Jam; Format: CD, digital download | 74 | 11 | 7 |

=== Singles ===
List of singles, with selected chart positions, showing year released and album name
| Title | Year | Peak chart positions | | | Album |
| Title | Year | U.S. | U.S. R&B /HH | U.S. Rap | Album |
|---|---|---|---|---|---|
| "Duffle Bag Boy" (featuring Lil Wayne) | 2007 | 15 | 4 | 2 | Supply & Demand |
| "U Can Believe It" (featuring Ludacris) | 2007 | — | — | — | Supply & Demand |
| "Stupid" (featuring OJ da Juiceman) | 2009 | — | 101 | — | Flight 360: The Takeoff |
| "Hold Up" | 2009 | — | 106 | — | Flight 360: The Takeoff |
| "Can't Remember" (featuring Bobby V) | 2009 | — | 85 | — | Flight 360: The Takeoff |
"—" denotes a recording that did not chart.
