= Supply & Demand (Playaz Circle album) =

Studio album by Playaz Circle
- Released: October 30, 2007
- Recorded: 2004–07
- Studios: Upstairs (Atlanta); The Bank (Atlanta); Hot Beats (Atlanta); The Ludaplex (Atlanta); Area 51 (Detroit); PatchWerk (Atlanta); Doppler (Atlanta); Legacy (New York City); Hit Factory Criteria (Miami); Circle House (Miami); H&N (Miami)
- Genre: Hip-hop
- Length: 43:57
- Labels: Disturbing tha Peace; Def Jam South
- Producers: Chaka Zulu (exec.); Jeff Dixon (exec.); Ludacris (exec.); B-Crucial; Bigg D; Buckwild; Drumma Boy; Jean "J Rock" Borges; Knoxville; Kon Artis; M16; Midnight Black; StreetRunner; Tony Dinero; Wonder Arillo

Playaz Circle chronology
United we stand United we fall (2002)	Supply & Demand (2007)	Flight 360: The Takeoff (2009)

Singles from Supply & Demand
- 1. "Duffle Bag Boy" Released: May 1, 2007; 2. "Betta Knock" Released: December 12, 2007; 3. "#1 Trap Pick" Released: April 8, 2008; 4. "Paper Chaser" Released: August 19, 2008; 5. "We Workin'" Released: October 28, 2009

Professional ratings
Review scores
Source	Rating
AllMusic	3/5 stars
HipHopDX	1.5/5
PopMatters	4/10
RapReviews	6/10

Supply & Demand is the second and major label debut studio album by American Southern hip-hop duo Playaz Circle from Atlanta. It was released on October 30, 2007, via Disturbing tha Peace and Def Jam South Recordings. Recording sessions took place at Upstairs Studio, The Bank, Hot Beats Recording Studios, The Ludaplex, PatchWerk Recording Studios and Doppler Studios in Atlanta, at Area 51 in Detroit, at Legacy Recording Studios in New York, at Hit Factory Criteria, Circle House Studios and H&N Studio in Miami. Production was handled by B-Crucial, Bigg D, Buckwild, Drumma Boy, Jean "J Rock" Borges, Knoxville, M16, Midnight Black, Mr. Porter, Streetrunner, Tony Dinero and Wonder Arillo, with Chaka Zulu, Jeff Dixon and Ludacris serving as executive producers. It features guest appearances from Ludacris, Lil Wayne, Phonte and Shawnna.

The title of the album was believed to have been changed to Pound 4 Pound, but in an interview Tity Boi confirmed the title to be Supply & Demand. Playaz Circle released a single on called "U Can Believe It" featuring Ludacris and Duffle Bag Boy featuring Lil Wayne. The album debuted at No. 27 on the Billboard 200, selling 26,138 copies. In its second week, it dropped to No. 79, selling 11,261 copies.

== Track listing ==
No.	Title	Writer(s)	Producer(s)	Length
1.	"Dear Mr. L.A. Reid"	Earl Conyers; Tauheed Epps; David Stokes; Mikki Farrow; Marvin Jackson; Walter Sigler	Knoxville	4:29
2.	"#1 Trap Pick"	Conyers; Epps; Brian Morton; Tony Ratliff	B-Crucial; Tony Dinero	3:24
3.	"Duffle Bag Boy" (featuring Lil' Wayne)	Conyers; Epps; Dwayne Carter; Joshua Banks	M-16	4:18
4.	"Betta Knock" (featuring Ludacris)	Conyers; Epps; Christopher Bridges; Gabriel Arillo	Wonder Arillo	4:13
5.	"Paper Chaser" (featuring Phonte)	Conyers; Epps; Phonte Coleman; Denaun Porter	Kon Artis	4:02
6.	"We Workin'"	Conyers; Epps; Christopher Gholson	Drumma Boy	3:05
7.	"U Can Believe It" (featuring Ludacris)	Conyers; Epps; Bridges; Anthony Best; Tom Brock	Buckwild	4:23
8.	"Paint Still Wet"	Conyers; Epps; Tracey Sewell	Midnight Black	4:25
9.	"Outlaw"	Conyers; Epps; Derrick Baker	Bigg D	3:29
10.	"Gucci Bag" (featuring Shawnna)	Conyers; Epps; Rashawnna Guy; Jean Borges	J-Rock	4:25
11.	"Let Me Fly"	Conyers; Epps; Nicholas Warwar	Streetrunner	3:44
Total length:				43:57

Sample credits

- Track 1 contains a sample of "A Woman Needs a Good Man" written by Mikki Farrow, Marvin Jackson and Bunny Sigler and performed by The Three Degrees
- Track 7 contains elements of "The Love We Share Is the Greatest of Them All" written by Tom Brock

== Charts ==
Chart performance for Supply & Demand
Chart (2007)	Peak position
US Billboard 200	27
US Top R&B/Hip-Hop Albums (Billboard)	3
US Top Rap Albums (Billboard)	1
