= Dusk Till Dawn (album) =

Studio album by Bobby V
- Released: October 16, 2012
- Length: 49:58
- Labels: Blu Kolla Dreams; E1 Music
- Producers: ConeyGurl; Guitar Boy; K.E. on the Track; Bill Jabr; J. Leron; The Platinum Brothers; Tim & Bob

Bobby V chronology
Fly on the Wall (2011)	Dusk Till Dawn (2012)	Electrik (2018)

Singles from Dusk Till Dawn
- 1. "Mirror" Released: May 30, 2012; 2. "Rock Body" Released: October 12, 2012; 3. "Put It In" Released: November 5, 2012

Dusk Till Dawn is the fifth studio album by American R&B singer Bobby V. It was released on October 16, 2012, by Blu Kolla Dreams and Entertainment One. Bobby V began recording the album in 2011 and completed it in 2012 at 3MG Studios and The Blue Room Recording Studios in Atlanta, Georgia. The album features guest appearances from Lil Wayne, Red Café, K. Michelle, Future, Gucci Mane, and Cassidy, while production was provided by The Platinum Brothers, Tim & Bob, and others.

Critics gave Dusk Till Dawn mixed reviews, with some praising its consistency, balanced mix of tempos, and collaborations, while others criticized its repetitive lyrics, sexual themes, and lack of musical development. Commercially, the album debuted at number 91 on the US Billboard 200 and number 12 on the Top R&B/Hip-Hop Albums chart, becoming Bobby V's lowest-charting album. "Mirror," the album's lead single, peaked at number 49 on the US Hot R&B/Hip-Hop Songs chart.

== Promotion ==
In May 2012, Bobby V released the first single from his album, titled "Mirror," which features rapper Lil Wayne. It was produced by K.E. on the Track and written by Bobby V, Lil Wayne, Kevin Erondu and Ryan Hirt. The music video premiered on Vevo on July 26, 2012, directed by Rob Dade. In October 2012, Bobby V released the second single from his album, titled "Rock Body" Produced by Jeffrey "J Leron" Toney and written by Bobby V, Jeffrey Toney, Radric Davis and Ryan Hirt. The music video premiered on YouTube on October 11, 2012, directed by 2-Mill and was filmed in midtown Atlanta at Ramsey's Beauty Salon/Barbershop. Bobby V released a video for the song "Role Play" featuring Red Café on November 13, 2012, on Vevo. In November 2012, Kontrol Magazine released a behind the scenes of the video for "Put it In" featuring singer K. Michelle. On January 15, 2013, the music video for "Put It In" featuring K. Michelle was released.

== Critical reception ==
Professional ratings
Review scores
Source	Rating
AllMusic	2/5 stars
Parlé	4/5

Kevin Benoit of Parlé praised Dusk Till Dawn for its consistency and described it as another strong entry in Bobby V's catalog, highlighting the album's balance of uptempo tracks and slow jams. He noted that, unlike Fly on the Wall, the songs were more seamlessly interwoven rather than divided by tempo, while praising Bobby .'s songwriting and chemistry with his collaborators. Benoit singled out the duet "Put It In" featuring K. Michelle as the album's standout and commended the guest appearances for complementing Bobby V's R&B style, ultimately finding little to criticize beyond the album's relatively short 12-track length. Andy Kellman of AllMusic gave Dusk Till Dawn a mixed assessment, noting that its familiar R&B sound would satisfy listeners seeking consistency but offered little development from Bobby V's earlier work. He criticized the album's repetitive lyrics and frequent sexual themes, as well as its largely forgettable guest appearances, though he singled out the regretful "Before You Break My Heart" as a notable exception.

== Commercial performance ==
Dusk Till Dawn debuted at number 91 on the US Billboard 200, with first-week sales of 5,000 copies in the United States. It peaked at number 12 on the US Top R&B/Hip-Hop Albums chart, making it Bobby V's lowest-charting album and his first to miss the top 10 on both charts.

== Track listing ==
Dusk Till Dawn track listing
No.	Title	Writer(s)	Producer(s)	Length
1.	"Dusk Till Dawn (Intro)"	Bobby Wilson; Jeffrey Toney; Ryan Hirt	J. Leron	1:28
2.	"Are You Ready"	Wilson; Tim Kelley; Bob Robinson; Hirt	Tim & Bob	3:33
3.	"Mirror" (featuring Lil Wayne)	Wilson; R.O. Tibbs; Dwayne Carter; Kevin Erondu; Hirt; F. Tibbs	K.E. on the Track	4:48
4.	"Before You Break My Heart"	Wilson; Toney; Hirt	J. Leron; Bobby V^{[a]}	3:24
5.	"Role Play" (featuring Red Café)	Wilson; Jermaine Denny; Bill Jabr; Hirt	Jabr	5:18
6.	"Put It In" (featuring K. Michelle)	Wilson; Kimberly Pate; Adam Gibbs; Mike Chesser; Luke Austin; Hirt	The Platinum Brothers; Austin^{[a]}	3:09
7.	"Nothing On You"	Wilson; Patrick Hayes; Justin Franks; Hirt	Guitar Boy; DJ Frank E^{[a]}	4:05
8.	"Tipsey Love" (featuring Future)	Wilson; Denisia "BluJune" Andrews; Brittany Coney; Nayvadius Wilburn	ConeyGurl	4:07
9.	"Ooh (She Got Me Like)"	Wilson; Toney; Hirt	Leron	4:02
10.	"Rock Body" (featuring Gucci Mane)	Wilson; Radric Davis; Toney; Hirt	Leron	3:43
11.	"She Got It All" (featuring Cassidy)	Wilson; Barry Reese; Toney; Hirt	Leron	3:39
12.	"1st Class Love"	Wilson; Gibbs; Chesser; Austin; Hirt	The Platinum Brothers; Austin^{[a]}	4:27
13.	"Save Me from Me"	Wilson; Toney; Hirt	Leron; Bobby V^{[a]}	4:09

Notes

- ^{^[a]} denotes co-producer(s)

== Personnel ==
Managerial

- Bobby "V" Wilson - A&R, Executive Producer, Producer
- Courtney Stewart "Court Luv" - A&R, Executive Producer
- Julia Sutowski - Coordinating Producer
- The Platinum Brothers - Producer
- Jeffrey "J Leron" Toney - Producer
- Kevin Erondu - Producer
- DJ Frank E - Producer
- Brittany Coney - Producer
- Luke Austin - Producer
- Bill Jabr - Instrumentation, Producer
- Patrick "Guitarboy" Hayes - Instrumentation, Producer
- Ryan Hirt - A&R
- Danielle Harwood - A&R
- Roger "Mista Raja" Greene - A&R
- Bekah Connolly - A&R
- Brendan Laezza - Marketing
- Chris Herche - Marketing

Performance Credits

- Red Café -
- Ursula Yancy - Vocals (Background)
- Lil Wayne
- Ashlee Chane'l - Vocals (Background)
- Gucci Mane
- Future

Visuals and Imagery

- Zach Wolfe - Photography
- Andrew Kelley Art Direction, Design
- Giovanna Melchiorre - Publicity
- Hanif Sumner - Publicity
- Shawnte Crespo - Product Manager

Instruments

- Murphy Mitchell - Piano
- Bob Rob - Drum Programming
- Andy Haller - Mixing, Soloist, Spanish Guitar
- Markeith Black - Guitar

Technical and production

- Micah Wyatt - Assistant Engineer
- James Kang - Engineer, Mixing
- Gary Edwards - Engineer
- Keith Dawson - Engineer, Mixing
- John Horesco IV - Mastering
- C. Stewart - Composer
- J. Denny - Composer
- J. Franks - Composer
- Paul Grosso - Creative Director

== Charts ==
Weekly chart performance for Dusk Till Dawn
Chart (2012)	Peak position
US Billboard 200	91
US Top R&B/Hip-Hop Albums (Billboard)	12
