= Beep (Bobby Valentino song) =

Single by Bobby V featuring Yung Joc

from the album The Rebirth
- Released: September 30, 2008
- Recorded: 2008
- Genre: R&B
- Length: 4:10
- Label: Universal Motown/Blu Kolla Dreams
- Songwriters: Robinson, Wilson, Leland Clopton, Courtney Stewart, Orlando Reid
- Producer: Big Fruit

Bobby Valentino singles chronology
"Mrs. Officer" (2008)	"Beep" (2008)	"Hands On Me" (2008)

Yung Joc singles chronology
"So Fly" (2008)	"Beep" (2008)	"Imma Put It on Her" (2009)

"Beep" is the first official single from Bobby V's third studio album The Rebirth. The single features Yung Joc and is produced by Mississippi native Leland Clopton AKA Big Fruit. "Beep" contains a sample of the 1985 hit "Moments in Love" by Art of Noise.

== Concept ==
The up-tempo track details the joys of adventurous sex. In regards to his newest track Bobby notes,

The feedback from the record was so strong. When I played it for people and I sent it to the clubs everybody reacted to it quickly. My first single, I always want it to be for the people.” The single announces: “I’m back, I got a new situation – it’s one of those kinds of records that’s gonna make a statement.

== Songwriters ==
Robinson, Wilson, Leland Clopton, Courtney Stewart, and Orlando Reid collaborated on writing the song.

== Music video ==
The music video debuted via 106 & Park on December 2, 2008 and features cameo appearances from Chingy, DJ Drama, Lloyd, Sean Garrett, Rocko, V.I.C. and Buckeey from Flavor of Love 2 and Marvin Williams from the Atlanta Hawks.

== Official remix ==
The official remix features Ludacris, Lil' Kim and Lil Wayne and was released on February 3, 2009. Another remix was released Bobby V's Lights, Camera & R&B mixtape featuring Lil Wayne & Maino. Lil Wayne's verse is slightly different in this version.

== Charts ==
=== Weekly charts ===
Chart (2008–09)	Peak Position
US Billboard Hot 100	55
US Billboard Hot R&B/Hip-Hop Songs	6

=== Year-end charts ===
Chart (2009)	Position
US Hot R&B/Hip-Hop Songs (Billboard)	52
