= Disturbing tha Peace Presents Bobby Valentino =

Studio album by Bobby Valentino
- Released: April 26, 2005
- Length: 62:40
- Labels: Def Jam South; Disturbing tha Peace
- Producers: Larrance Dopson; Lamar Edwards; Gary Smith; Steve "Swift" Thornton; Tim & Bob; Rondeau "Duke" Williams

Bobby Valentino chronology
Disturbing tha Peace Presents Bobby Valentino (2005)	Special Occasion (2007)

Singles from Bobby Valentino
- 1. "Slow Down" Released: February 14, 2005; 2. "Tell Me" Released: August 2, 2005; 3. "My Angel (Never Leave You)" Released: October 11, 2005

Disturbing tha Peace Presents Bobby Valentino is the debut studio album by American R&B singer Bobby Valentino. It was released by Def Jam South Recordings and Disturbing tha Peace on April 26, 2005. The album was primarily produced and executive produced by Tim Kelley and Bob Robinson from duo Tim & Bob, while additional production was provided by Larrance Dopson, Lamar Edwards, Gary Smith, Steve "Swift" Thornton, and Rondeau "Duke" Williams. Rapper Ludacris appears as a guest vocalist on the album.

The album earned largely polarized reviews from critics, some of whom complimented the production, while others felt that it was undistinguishable. A commercial success, it debuted at number three on the US Billboard 200 and at number one on the Top R&B/Hip-Hop Albums chart, eventually reaching Gold status, while also reaching the top five of the UK R&B Albums, also going Gold. Bobby Valentino spawned three singles, including the Hot R&B/Hip-Hop Songs number-one and UK top five hit "Slow Down", follow-up "Tell Me", and "My Angel (Never Leave You)".

== Background ==
Valentino entered the music scene in 1996 as a member of the R&B youth quartet Mista, at this time using his real name. The new teenage group released their self-titled first record under the guisdance of production team Organized Noize. However, the album, released by EastWest Records, earned lukewarm commercial success and due to management issues, Mista split in 1997. Valentino later enrolled at Clark Atlanta University majoring in mass communications. While in school, he continued to record in his free time in hopes of one day returning to the stage.

In 2004, he signed as a solo artist with rapper Ludacris's Disturbing tha Peace and began work on his solo debut along with production duo Tim & Bob. In January 2005, the label inked a new long-term contract with Island Def Jam Music Group. Under terms of the joint-venture agreement, Island Def Jam continued its marketing, publicity, promotion and sales support of the label's releases, while Valentino's debut was selected as the first release under the new agreement. Initially titled Give Me a Chance, it was announced to be released in April 2005.

== Critical reception ==
Professional ratings
Review scores
Source	Rating
AllMusic	3.5/5 stars
PopMatters	2/10
Rolling Stone	3/5 stars
Stylus Magazine	D+

Bobby Valentino earned largely polarizing reviews from critics. David Jeffries of Allmusic gave the album a positive review. He stated, "Valentino's first full-length has mystical touches in its overall slick and sexy production, touches that help separate the album from the competition in a way the everyday songwriting doesn't." Jeffries further noted: "Of course, it is a debut and, considering that, pulling a daring punch or two is forgiven. If he keeps on the path of breaking the R&B crooner rule book and really lets his inner maverick out, he will go farther than competition can even imagine." Rolling Stone's Bill Werde found that "on his debut, Valentino's honeyed croon and hilarious pickup lines practically ooze all over the tracks. The beats on Valentino have just enough crunk to bring some bump-and-grind to the slow dance: The simple snare tracks, layered with soft guitar, strings and flute, lend undeniable atmosphere to Valentino's come-ons."

In a negative review for Stylus Magazine Thomas Inskeep noted that "this album is nothing but a “Quick, the single’s hot!” cash-in, one which could have been far better than it is, but nearly everyone involved sounds as if they fell asleep on the job – even Ludacris, which is saying something. Valentino’s got no substance behind his pretty-boy façade, and on Disturbing Tha Peace Presents Bobby Valentino, it shows." Steve Horowitz of PopMatters wrote that "Valentino has an undistinguished voice, writes hackneyed lyrics, and his instrumental backing suffers from tedious production values [...] Valentino's not very deep or affective. He may share the same last name as the charismatic silent film star, but Rudy could say more with his eyes then Bobby can sing with his whole body on an entire CD worth of material."

== Commercial performance ==
The album debuted and peaked at number 3 on the US Billboard 200 in the week of May 14, 2005, with first-week sales of 180,000 copies. It also debuted at number one on the US Top R&B/Hip-Hop Albums chart. On June 2, 2005, Bobby Valentino was certified Gold by the Recording Industry Association of America (RIAA) for shipments figures in excess of 500,000 copies. By April 2008, it had sold 706,000 units domestically. Bobby Valentino also reached number 34 on the UK Albums Chart. On June 24, 2005, It was certified Silver by the British Phonographic Industry (BPI), followed by a Gold cerification on March 4, 2006.

== Track listing ==
Disturbing tha Peace Presents Bobby Valentino track listing
No.	Title	Writer(s)	Producer(s)	Length
1.	"Some Bobby"	Annan Gause; Gary "Gizzo" Smith; Bobby Wilson	Smith	0:34
2.	"Slow Down"	Tim Kelley; Bob Robinson; Wilson	Tim & Bob	4:18
3.	"Give Me a Chance" (featuring Ludacris)	Kelley; Robinson; Wilson; Christopher Bridges	Tim & Bob	4:43
4.	"Never Lonely"	Kelley; Robinson; Wilson	Tim & Bob	4:42
5.	"Mista Valentino" (Interlude)	Kelley; Robinson; Wilson	Tim & Bob	1:08
6.	"Tell Me"	Kelley; Robinson; Wilson	Tim & Bob	4:20
7.	"My Angel (Never Leave You)"	Kelley; Robinson; Wilson	Tim & Bob	4:45
8.	"Want You to Know Me"	Kelley; Robinson; Wilson	Tim & Bob	4:49
9.	"Gangsta Love"	Steve "Swift" Thornton; Larrance Dopson; Lamar Edwards; Wilson	Edwards; Dopson; Thornton	3:45
10.	"Come Touch Me"	Kelley; Robinson; Wilson	Tim & Bob	4:10
11.	"I'll Forgive You" (Interlude)	Kelley; Robinson	Tim & Bob	0:59
12.	"I'll Forgive You"	Kelley; Robinson; Wilson	Tim & Bob	4:23
13.	"Love Dream"	Kelley; Robinson; Wilson	Tim & Bob	4:31
14.	"Lights Down Low"	Greg Colbert; Rondeau Williams; Wilson	Williams	4:45
15.	"One Girl to Love"	Kelley; Robinson; Wilson	Tim & Bob	5:01
16.	"Thank You Lord" (Outro)	Kelley; Robinson	Tim & Bob	1:33
Total length:				62:40

International bonus track
No.	Title	Writer(s)	Producer(s)	Length
17.	"Slow Down" (Remix)	Kelley; Robinson; Donald DeGrate; Raymond Jones; Robert Jones	Tim & Bob	4:07

== Personnel ==
- Leslie Brathwaite – mixing
- Kevin "KD" Davis – mixing
- Jeff Dixon – executive producer
- Larrance Dopson – producer
- Lamar Edwards – keyboards, producer, engineer
- Michael Eleopoulos – engineer
- William "Poon Daddy" Engram – A&R
- Clare Fischer – string arrangements
- Mark Ford – groomer
- Annan Gause – guitar
- Andy Haller – engineer
- Kalenna Harper – vocals
- Jean-Marie Horvat – mixing
- Jun Ishizeki – engineer
- Tia Johnson – design, creative director
- Tim Kelley – executive producer, bass, acoustic guitar, piano, keyboards, engineer, mixing, fender rhodes, drum programming, instrumentation
- Christian Lantry – photography
- Ludacris – executive producer
- Nonja McKenzie – stylist
- Andrew Nast – engineer
- Brooke Newman – vocals
- Herb Powers – mastering
- Dale "Rambro" Ramsey – engineer
- Bob Robinson – executive producer, guitar (acoustic), guitar, piano, guitar (electric), keyboards, Hammond organ, guitar (12 string), fender rhodes
- Gary Smith – producer, engineer, drum programming
- Sean Tallman – assistant
- Steve "Swiff D" Thornton – producer, engineer
- Bobby Valentino – vocals (background)
- Rondeau "Duke" Williams – producer, engineer, instrumentation
- Chaka Zulu – executive producer

== Charts ==
=== Weekly charts ===
Weekly chart performance for Disturbing tha Peace Presents Bobby Valentino
Chart (2005)	Peak position
French Albums (SNEP)	74
German Albums (Offizielle Top 100)	87
UK Albums (Official Charts)	34
UK R&B Albums (Official Charts)	5
US Billboard 200	3
US Top R&B/Hip-Hop Albums (Billboard)	1

=== Year-end charts ===
Year-end chart performance for Disturbing tha Peace Presents Bobby Valentino
Chart (2005)	Position
US Billboard 200	109
US Top R&B/Hip-Hop Albums (Billboard)	26

== Certifications ==
Certifications for Disturbing tha Peace Presents Bobby Valentino
Region	Certification	Certified units/sales
United Kingdom (BPI)	Gold	100,000^{^}
United States (RIAA)	Gold	706,000
^{^} Shipments figures based on certification alone.

== Release history ==
Release dates and formats for Disturbing tha Peace Presents Bobby Valentino
Region	Date	Format(s)	Label
United States	April 26, 2005	CD; digital download	Disturbing tha Peace; Def Jam
France	April 26, 2005	CD; digital download	Disturbing tha Peace; Def Jam
United Kingdom	May 26, 2005	CD; digital download	Disturbing tha Peace; Def Jam
