= Mista (group) =

American contemporary R&B group

- Origin: Atlanta, Georgia, U.S.
- Genres: R&B
- Years active: 1994–1998
- Label: Elektra/EastWest
- Past members: Darryl Allen; Brandon Brown; Byron Reeder; Bobby Valentino

Mista was an American R&B group in the mid-1990s from Atlanta, Georgia. Under the production of Organized Noize, the group released their self-titled debut album in 1996, which produced the single "Blackberry Molasses" (#53 U.S., #13 U.S. R&B). This song begins with a sample of Undisputed Truths 1974 song ‘Big John is My Name.’ However, the album did not follow in the same success and despite a second album being produced by Tim & Bob, it was never released. Due to management issues, the group split in 1997. Group member Bobby Valentino would go on to achieve success as a solo artist a few years later.

== Discography ==
=== Albums ===
Year	Album	Chart positions		
Year	Album	US	US R&B	Heatseekers
1996	Mista	183	37	7

=== Singles ===
Year	Single	Chart positions	
Year	Single	US	US R&B
1996	"Blackberry Molasses"	53	13
1996	"Lady"	90	61

=== Soundtrack appearances ===
Year	Song	Album
1998	"About You"	Why Do Fools Fall In Love OST
