= I Need an Angel =

Single by Daniel DeBourg

from the album Tell the World
- Released: 2002
- Recorded: 2001
- Genre: Gospel
- Length: 4:13
- Label: DreamWorks
- Songwriter: R. Kelly
- Producer: R. Kelly

"I Need an Angel" is a song by singer Daniel DeBourg released on his Tell the World album in 2002, that made number 30 on the Billboard Hot Adult Contemporary Tracks chart. The song was produced and written by R. Kelly.

A version performed by R. Kelly himself was included on advance copies of his 2004 double album, Happy People/U Saved Me, but was replaced with the song "I Surrender" on the final release.

The song was remade by second-season American Idol winner Ruben Studdard in 2004, as the title track of his album I Need an Angel. It peaked at number 32 on the Billboard Adult Contemporary chart.
