= Turn the Page (Bobby Valentino song) =

Single by Bobby Valentino

from the album Special Occasion
- Released: October 10, 2006 (U.S.)
- Genre: R&B
- Length: 4:25
- Label: DTP; Def Jam
- Songwriter(s): Rodney Jerkins; L. Danielsson; John "Jon Jon" Webb, Jr.
- Producer(s): Rodney Jerkins

Bobby Valentino singles chronology
"My Angel" (2005)	"Turn the Page" (2006)	"Anonymous" (2007)

"Turn the Page" is the first single from Bobby Valentino's second studio album, Special Occasion. The song is produced by Rodney Jerkins.

== Charts ==
Chart (2006)	Peak position
US Hot R&B/Hip-Hop Songs (Billboard)	63
