= Come with Me (EP) =

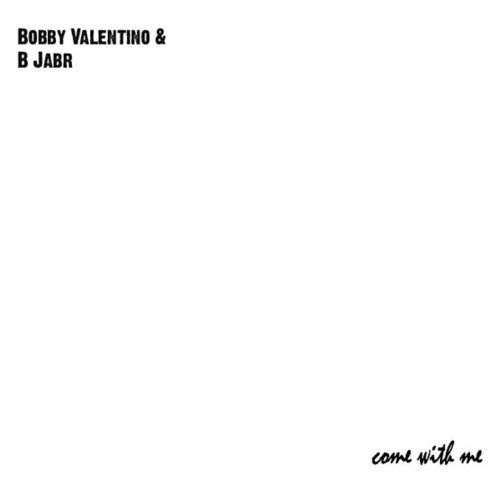

EP by Bobby Valentino
- Released: March 2, 2008
- Genre: R&B, soul
- Label: Veltre Records
- Producer: Bobby Valentino

Bobby Valentino chronology
Special Occasion (2007)	Come with Me (2008)	The Rebirth (2009)

Come with Me is a 2008 extended play by American R&B singer Bobby Valentino. It was released on March 2, 2008 and was the first EP to be released by Valentino. According to Bobby the album's premise focused around the "Bobby Valentino experience."

The album was released through iTunes just three weeks after Bobby announced his departure from Disturbing tha Peace. Bobby Valentino and Bill Jabr co-wrote and co-produced the entire album. Come with Me featured the single “Another Life”, which was well received through online outlets, and a remake of the Marvin Gaye classic, "What’s Going On".

== Track listing ==
No.	Title	Length
1.	"All About You"	5:36
2.	"Another Life"	6:08
3.	"Island Girl"	5:23
4.	"I Think She's the One (Instrumental)"	3:54
5.	"What's Going On"	4:19
6.	"Outro - Let's Get Out of Here"	2:39
