= Daniel de Bourg =

English actor, singer, songwriter, dancer and model

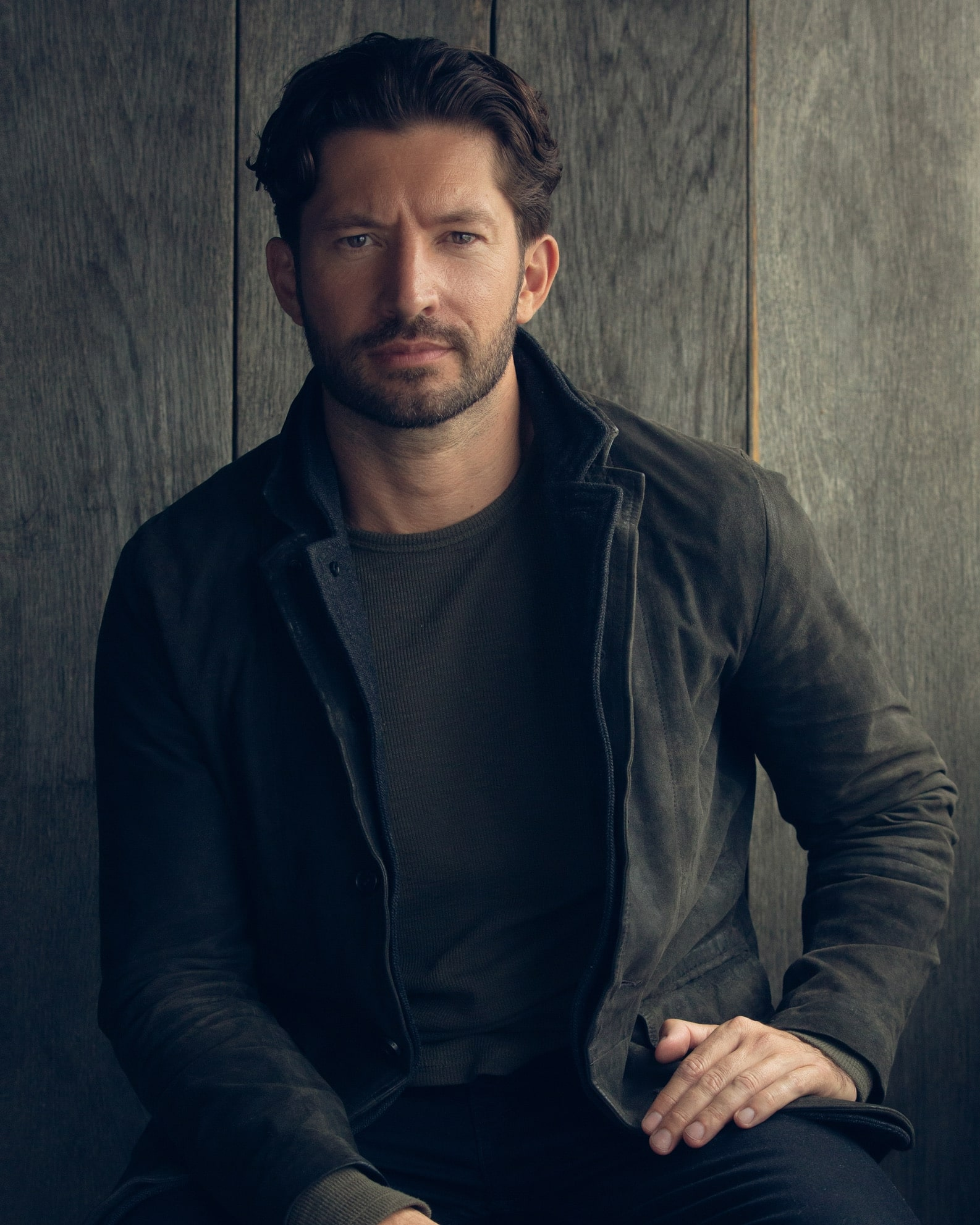

Background information
- Also known as: DDB
- Born: 13 April 1976 (age 50); Chelmsford, Essex, England
- Origin: London
- Genres: Pop, soul
- Occupations: Singer, songwriter, actor, dancer
- Years active: 2000–present
- Label: DreamWorks

Daniel de Bourg (/dəˈbɜːr/ də-BUR; born 13 April 1976) is an English singer, songwriter, and actor.

== Early life and influences ==
Originally from Chelmsford, Essex, England. By the time de Bourg was eleven, he was offered a full scholarship to study at the Royal Ballet School after being spotted by talent scouts, and graduating at the top of his class with his final solo performance. Although dance was his primary interest, as a teen he was also fronting bands. He left school when given the opportunity to dance for the Rambert Dance Company, performing as a featured dancer all over the world. It was at the suggestion of a friend that heard him singing that de Bourg found himself in the position for a career in music.

== Music career ==
Influenced by artists such as Prince and Stevie Wonder, de Bourg did not take to a singing career straight away. Dedicated to dance, de Bourg's early interest in singing was rediscovered after a knee injury caused some time out from his dance career. de Bourg turned his hand to songwriting; recorded by singer Jamelia in 2000, his song "Money" reached number 5 on the UK Singles Chart. Remembering de Bourg's musical talents, he was encouraged by a friend to create several demos of his own singing. These attracted the interest of DreamWorks scout Robbie Robertson. de Bourg was introduced to then in-house producers Tim & Bob and subsequently signed to the label and the duo produced his debut album, Tell the World. The high-production album, released in 2002, launched the single "I Need an Angel", which hit number 30 on the Billboard Adult Contemporary chart.

In 2008, UK artist DJ Ironik presented de Bourg on his album, No Point in Wasting Tears.

In 2010, The DDB Mixtape Vol. 1: The Prelude, a mixture of de Bourg's most popular covers and original material, received a nomination for 'Best R&B Mixtape 2010' and went on to win the award at The Official Mixtape Awards in early 2011. He went on to win the same accolade another two years in a row with 'The DDB Mixtape Vol. 2 : The Bridge' in 2011 and 'Outro' in 2012.

In 2013, Daniel released his album, London Bread. featuring production from Drake and Lil Wayne hit maker, Boi-1da. The album hit the top 20 on iTunes in 21 countries in its first week of release.

His YouTube channel, that envelops a mix of his cover songs has grown to over 260,000 subscribers and close to 50 million views.

== Acting career ==
In 2015, de Bourg signed with a TV, film and stage agent in London, and was cast in the Broadway transfer of Disney's Aladdin that opened at the Prince Edward Theatre in the West End in London, in 2016. He went on to play the principle role of Kassim from 2017 to 2019.

In 2020 de Bourg was cast in the original cast in the West End of Pretty Woman the Musical at The Piccadilly Theatre covering both the leading role as Edward and the supporting lead role as Stucky.

De Bourg then moved into screen acting and was cast by Donald Glover in his US series Atlanta in early 2021, appearing in the 3rd series as a poker-playing German millionaire, Yonathan.

De Bourg was then cast by Hollywood director Martin Campbell in his action thriller, Memory starring Liam Neeson, Guy Pearce and Monica Bellucci. De Bourg stars as cut-throat lawyer Willam Borden.

De Bourg has been filming in Morocco with October Films for their new TV series Colosseum in the lead role of Haterius and features in season 2 of Whitstable Pearl as troubled pilot Noah.

== Filmography ==
=== Film ===
Year	Title	Role	Notes
2021	Ghost Tale	Peter	
2022	Memory	William Borden	
2025	Odyssey	Dom	
2025	Fountain of Youth	Harold	
2025	All This Time	Elias	
2025	The Family Plan 2	Jules	

Key
†	Denotes films that have not yet been released

== Discography ==
=== Studio albums ===
- 2002: Tell the World
- 2013: London Bread
- 2014: "X-Play Pt. One"
- 2015: "X-Play Pt. Two"

=== Mixtapes ===
- 2010: The DDB Mixtape Volume 1 - The Prelude
- 2011: The DDB Mixtape Volume 2 - The Bridge
- 2012: The DDB Mixtape Volume 3 - Outro
- 2013: Overdrive
