= Blackberry Molasses =

1996 single by Mista

Single by Mista

from the album Mista
- Released: June 11, 1996
- Length: 4:06
- Label: EastWest
- Songwriters: Marqueze Etheridge; Ray Murray; Rico Wade; Patrick Brown
- Producer: Organized Noize

Mista singles chronology
"Blackberry Molasses" (1996)	"Lady" (1996)

Audio
- "Blackberry Molasses" on YouTube

"Blackberry Molasses" is a song performed by American R&B group Mista. It is the opening track on their eponymous debut album (1996) and serves as the album's first single. The song is produced by Organized Noize and was released as a single in June 1996 by EastWest Records. It became the group's highest-charting single on the US Cash Box Top 100 and Billboard Hot 100 charts, peaking at numbers 41 and 53. "Blackberry Molasses" also became a top-10 hit in New Zealand, where it reached number four on the RIANZ Singles Chart. The accompanying music video was directed by American director Hype Williams.

== Charts ==
=== Weekly charts ===
Chart (1996)	Peak position
New Zealand (Recorded Music NZ)	4
US Billboard Hot 100	53
US Hot R&B Singles (Billboard)	13
US Cash Box Top 100	41

=== Year-end charts ===
Chart (1996)	Position
New Zealand (RIANZ)	42
US Hot R&B Singles (Billboard)	70

== Release history ==
Region	Date	Format(s)	Label(s)	Ref.
United States	June 11, 1996	Rhythmic contemporary radio	EastWest	
United States	June 25, 1996	Contemporary hit radio	EastWest	
