= Tell the World (Daniel de Bourg album) =

Tell The World

Studio album by Daniel de Bourg
- Released: May 14, 2002
- Recorded: 2001–2002
- Genre: Pop
- Length: 50:35
- Label: DreamWorks, DDB
- Producer: Tim & Bob, R. Kelly

Professional ratings
Review scores
Source	Rating
AllMusic	4/5 stars

Tell The World is the debut album by pop singer Daniel de Bourg, that was released in 2002 on DreamWorks Records. Tell the World was later reissued in 2009 on de Bourg's independent label DDB Records.

All of the songs on the album were produced by the production team Tim & Bob, with the exception of "I Need an Angel", which was written and produced by R. Kelly.

== Track listing ==
1. "Intro" – 1:14
2. "Tell the World" - Tim Kelley, Bob Robinson – 4:17
3. "24 Hours" - Kelley, Robinson – 4:05
4. "Flowers" - Kelley, Robinson, de Bourg – 4:18
5. "Made for Me" - Kelley, Robinson – 4:38
6. "Don't Worry About a Thing" - Kelley, Robinson – 4:29
7. "I Need an Angel" - R. Kelly – 5:17
8. "My World" - Kelley, Robinson – 4:01
9. "Give It to You" (Featuring Heavy D) - de Bourg, Heavy D, Kelley – 4:22
10. "Let Yourself Go" - Kelley, Robinson – 4:04
11. "Don't Make Me Wait" - Kelley, Robinson – 5:30
12. "In the Morning" - Kelley, Robinson – 4:56
13. "Really Need You" - Kelley, Robinson – 4:59
14. "Shadow" - Kelley, Robinson – 4:30
15. "Interlude" - Kelley, Robinson – 3:15
16. "Book of Love" - Kelley, Robinson – 5:00
17. "Interlude" – 0:15

== Personnel ==
- Percy Bady - Keyboards
- Daniel de Bourg - vocals
- Dalvin DeGrate - drums
- Thomas Dienner - String instruments
- Assa Drori - Strings
- Brent Fischer - Strings
- Clare Fischer - String Arrangements
- Yvonne Gage Choir - Chorus
- Maurice Grants - Strings
- Tim Kelley - Executive Producer, Arranger, Drum Programming, Keyboards, Guitar, Piano
- Igor Kiskatchi - Strings
- Donnie Lyle - Guitar
- Jeffrey Morrow Choir - Chorus
- Jennifer Munday - Strings
- Andrew Picken - Strings
- Bob Robinson - Keyboards
- Julie Rogers - Strings
- Anatoly Rosinsky - Strings
- Johnny Rutledge Choir - Chorus
- Robert Sanov - Strings
- Richard Treat - Strings
- Joan Walton Choir - Chorus
- Cheryl Wilson Choir - Chorus

== Production ==
- Producers: Tim & Bob, R. Kelly
- Executive producers: Tim Kelley and Bob Robinson, Robbie Robertson
- Background Vocals: Daniel de Bourg,

== Charts ==
Singles - Billboard (North America)

Year	Single	Chart	Position
2002	"I Need An Angel"	Hot Adult Contemporary	30
