= Anonymous (song) =

Single by Bobby Valentino featuring Timbaland

from the album Special Occasion
- Released: April 9, 2007
- Genre: R&B, hip hop, synthpop
- Length: 4:44 (album version); 4:02 (radio edit)
- Label: DTP, Def Jam
- Songwriters: Timothy Mosley, King Logan, Jerome Harmon, Keri Hilson, Ezekiel Lewis, Balewa Muhammad, Candice Nelson, Patrick J. Que Smith
- Producers: Timbaland, The Royal Court (King Logan, Jerome Harmon)

Bobby Valentino singles chronology
"Turn the Page" (2006)	"Anonymous" (2007)	"Gimme Dat" (2008)

Timbaland singles chronology
"Give It to Me" (2007)	"Anonymous" (2007)	"The Way I Are" (2007)

"Anonymous" is a song by American singer Bobby Valentino, released by Def Jam Recordings and Disturbing tha Peace on April 9, 2007 as the second single from second studio album, Special Occasion (2007). The song was produced by record producer Timbaland, who also performs a guest appearance.

== Background information ==
The song was written by Ezekiel "Zeke" Lewis, Keri Hilson, Balewa Muhammad, Candice Nelson, and Patrick "J. Que" Smith of the popular songwriting/production team The Clutch. In addition, it shares a drum sample with the Three 6 Mafia song "Stay Fly," originally sampled from an earlier Willie Hutch song titled "Tell Me Why Our Love Turned Cold." The track has an intro reminiscent of Justin Timberlake's "My Love" and also shares similar vocals and lyrics to "Tell Me Why Our Love Turned Cold".

The music video (directed by Bernard Gourley) includes Steph Jones from the Disturbing Tha Peace family and model Nazanin Mandi as Valentino's love interest. However, Timbaland does not appear in the video, while his verse remains. "Anonymous" peaked at No. 49 on the U.S. Billboard Hot 100.

== Remixes ==
- "Anonymous (Official Remix)" featuring Consequence and Timbaland
- "Anonymous (Remix)" featuring Stimuli
- "Anonymous (Remix)" featuring Young Buck & The Game
- "Anonymous (Remix)" featuring Jay Read
- "Anonymous (Remix)" featuring Tango

The dance in the video was choreographed and performed by Timothy Fahey and Hiroka Mcrae.

== Charts ==
=== Weekly charts ===
Chart (2007)	Peak position
Ireland (IRMA)	34
Scottish Singles Sales (Official Charts)	43
UK Singles (Official Charts)	25
UK Hip Hop/R&B (Official Charts)	2
US Billboard Hot 100	49
US Hot R&B/Hip-Hop Songs (Billboard)	17
US Rhythmic Airplay (Billboard)	20

=== Year-end charts ===
Chart (2007)	Position
UK Urban (Music Week)	25
US Hot R&B/Hip-Hop Songs (Billboard)	70
