= Mista (album) =

Studio album by Mista
- Released: July 30, 1996
- Genre: R&B
- Length: 48:13
- Label: EastWest
- Producers: Sylvia Rhone, Eric Johnston, Organized Noize (Co-exec), Eric McCaine, Colin England, Tomi Martin, Marqueze Etheridge, Brandon Bennett, Christopher "Tricky" Stewart, Sean "Sep" Hall

Singles from Mista
- 1. "Blackberry Molasses" Released: June 18, 1996; 2. "Lady" Released: September 11, 1996

Professional ratings
Review scores
Source	Rating
AllMusic	2.5/5 stars

Mista is the only studio album by Atlanta-based R&B youth quartet, Mista, released on July 30, 1996, via East West Records. Produced entirely by super-producers Organized Noize (TLC's "Waterfalls"), Mista was fueled by the release of the album's first single "Blackberry Molasses". According to Organized Noize producer Rico Wade:

[Blackberry Molasses is] innovative. It starts out with almost a medieval feel. It's one of the most visual songs on the album with strong harmonies and a great melody.

Mista peaked at No. 37 on the Billboard Top R&B/Hip-Hop Albums chart and has sold over 100,000 copies since its 1996 release. The single, "Blackberry Molasses", peaked at No. 13 on the Billboard Hot R&B/Hip-Hop Songs chart. The second single, "Lady", peaked at number 61 on the same chart in December 1996.

== Track listing ==
No.	Title	Writer(s)	Length
1.	"Blackberry Molasses"	Marqueze Etheridge, Organized Noize	4:13
2.	"Fresh Groove"	Marqueze Etheridge, Organized Noize	4:48
3.	"Things You Do"	Brandon Bennett, Marqueze Etheridge, Organized Noize	3:58
4.	"If My Baby"	Preston Crump, Marqueze Etheridge, Organized Noize, Erik Nuri	4:19
5.	"I Think That I Should Be"	Brandon Bennett, Kandi Burruss, Marqueze Etheridge, McKinley Horton, Organized Noize	5:16
6.	"Lady"	Marqueze Etheridge, Organized Noize	3:42
7.	"? ♥ Is"	Colin England, Eric McCaine	4:46
8.	"Tears, Scars & Lies"	Brandon Bennett, Marqueze Etheridge, Tomi Martin	4:16
9.	"Everything Must Change (Interlude)"	Benard Ighner	1:36
10.	"What About Us"	Brandon Bennett, Thomas Burton, Organized Noize	4:12
11.	"Crossroads"	Ruben Bailey, Preston Crump, Marqueze Etheridge, Organized Noize	4:55
12.	"I'll Sweat You"	Christopher "Tricky" Stewart, Thabiso Nkhereanye, Sean Hall	4:13
