= Courtney Stewart =

American music manager and music business executive

- Education: Alabama State University

Courtney Stewart is an American talent manager and record executive. He founded Right Hand Music Group and the Right Hand Foundation in 2015, and co-founded Keep Cool Records in 2018. Stewart is credited with having discovered and signed American singer Khalid.

== Early life and education ==
Stewart attended North Atlanta High School and Alabama State University.

== Career ==
An early friendship with fellow musician Bobby V led Stewart to become his manager when his musical career took off. Later he ran Ludacris’ publishing company and managed hip-hop producers.

=== 2015–2019 ===
Stewart discovered Khalid in 2015-16 when the artist was still a teenager, and went on to mentor and manage him beginning in 2016. Following Khalid's breakout success, Stewart was included in Billboard's "40 Under 40: Music's Top Young Power Players" in 2017.

In 2018, with Tunji Balogun (the future CEO of Def Jam Recordings) and two others, Stewart co-founded Keep Cool Records, a joint venture with RCA Records. Keep Cool's first signing was Normani of Fifth Harmony. Its roster also includes Lucky Daye, VanJess, Freddie Gibbs & Madlib, UMI, and Marzz.

In October 2018 Billboard included Stewart in its "21 Under 21" list. Variety named him a Hitmaker in both 2018 and 2019. Stewart and Khalid delivered the keynote Q&A at the 2019 Pollstar Live! conference.

=== 2020–present ===
Stewart was a founding member and serves on the executive committee of the Black Music Action Coalition, a nonprofit formed in 2020 to combat systemic racism in the music industry. In 2020 Billboard included him on both its 2020 Power List and its R&B/Hip-Hop Power Players list, recognizing him for activism.

Also in 2020, his Right Hand Music Group partnered with Techstars Music, an accelerator program for music-related startups. Right Hand became Techstars' first member company owned by a person of color.

His management clients include Sinéad Harnett, Wynne, Marzz, and South African R&B artist Elaine in addition to Khalid.

== Philanthropy ==
Stewart began supporting local Atlanta shelters in 2015, buying and delivering Christmas gifts to local homeless shelters housed in hotels. Inspired by this experience, in 2019 he founded the Right Hand Foundation, which provides free housing and educational programs to single mothers and their children in Atlanta. The nonprofit launched its first "Right Hand Haven" housing in October 2019.

Stewart also assisted Khalid in setting up the Great Khalid Foundation. He worked with Great Khalid when it donated $500,000 to the El Paso Community Foundation in El Paso, Texas in 2019 to aid children and grandchildren of victims of the 3 August 2019 mass murder at Walmart.

In 2020 the National Museum of African American Music appointed Stewart to its board of directors' first Music Industry Relations Committee, and his Right Hand Foundation partnered with St. Stephen Missionary Baptist Church-East Point to help support struggling families during the holiday season.

In 2021 Billboard honored him as a Change Agent for helping the music community survive the COVID-19 pandemic and confront racial inequality.

He is also committed to the advancement of HBCUs and was honored in October 2021 with an Alabama State University (ASU) 50 Under 50 alumni award. In October 2022 he announced a $100,000 donation to ASU to create scholarships for communication students and enhance the university's communication department.
