= Tell Me (Bobby Valentino song) =

Single by Bobby Valentino

from the album Bobby Valentino
- Released: August 2, 2005
- Recorded: 2004–05
- Genre: R&B; hip hop
- Length: 4:20
- Label: Disturbing tha Peace, Def Jam
- Songwriter: Tim Kelley • Bob Robinson • Bobby Wilson • Tan Dun • Dwayne Carter (remix)
- Producer: Tim & Bob

Bobby Valentino singles chronology
"Slow Down" (2005)	"Tell Me" (2005)	"Pimpin' All Over the World" (2005)

"Tell Me" is a song by American R&B singer Bobby Valentino. It was released in the summer of 2005, as the second single from his eponymous debut album. The remix of the song features Lil Wayne. The song samples "Yearning for Peace" composed by Tan Dun and performed by Itzhak Perlman on the Hero soundtrack.

== Music video ==
The video directed by Erik White featured a remixed version with rapper Lil Wayne, but that version was not featured on the album.

== Charts ==
=== Weekly charts ===
Chart (2005)	Peak position
Scottish Singles Sales (Official Charts)	57
UK Hip Hop/R&B (Official Charts)	4
UK Singles (Official Charts)	38
US Billboard Hot 100	51
US Hot R&B/Hip-Hop Songs (Billboard)	13

=== Year-end charts ===
Chart (2005)	Position
US Hot R&B/Hip-Hop Songs (Billboard)	72
