= Bobby V =

American R&B singer (born 1980)

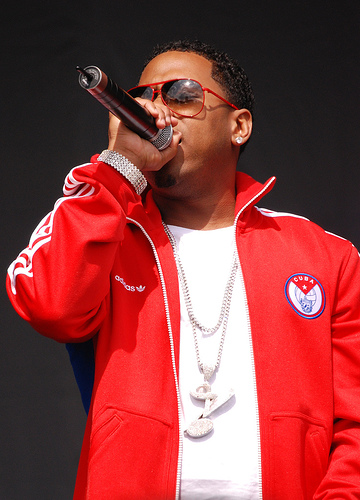
- Bobby V performing in 2007

Background information
- Also known as: Bobby Valentino; Bobby V-Tino
- Born: Bobby Marcel Wilson; February 27, 1980 (age 46); Jackson, Mississippi, U.S.
- Origin: Atlanta, Georgia, U.S.
- Education: Clark Atlanta University (BS)
- Genres: R&B
- Occupations: Singer; songwriter
- Works: Discography
- Years active: 1994–present
- Labels: SoNo; E1; Capitol; Blu Kolla Dreams; EMI; Def Jam; Disturbing tha Peace
- Formerly of: Mista
- Children: 1

Bobby Marcel Wilson (born February 27, 1980), better known by his stage name Bobby V (formerly known as Bobby Valentino), is an American R&B singer. Born in Jackson, Mississippi and raised in Atlanta, Georgia, he formed the R&B group Mista in 1994, prior to signing with Ludacris' record label, Disturbing tha Peace, in 2005.

Mista became best known for their 1996 single "Blackberry Molasses", which peaked at number 53 on the Billboard Hot 100 and preceded their eponymous debut studio album (1996), released by EastWest Records that same year. Narrowly impacting any music charts, the album underperformed commercially and led to the group's disbandment the following year.

Wilson furthered his education for the next several years, and 8 years later, signed with rapper Ludacris' record label Disturbing tha Peace, an imprint Def Jam Recordings. His 2005 debut single, "Slow Down", peaked at number eight on the Billboard Hot 100 and led his self-titled debut studio album (2005), which peaked at number three on the Billboard 200 and spawned a follow-up single, "Tell Me" (featuring Lil Wayne). His second album, Special Occasion (2007), was met with similar success and supported by the single "Anonymous" (featuring Timbaland). His third album, The Rebirth (2009), was released by EMI; all albums thus far have debuted atop the Top R&B/Hip-Hop Albums chart.

== Life and career ==
=== 1980–2004: Early life and career beginnings ===
Bobby Marcel Wilson was born on February 27, 1980, in Jackson, Mississippi. He later moved to Atlanta, Georgia. Growing up, Wilson listened to Michael Jackson, Tony! Toni! Toné!, Marvin Gaye, Jodeci, and The Isley Brothers. Those were the artists that inspired him to become a R&B singer. Wilson entered the music scene in 1996 as a member of the R&B youth quartet Mista, at this time using his real name, Bobby Wilson. The new teenage R&B group released their first record. Under the production of Organized Noize (TLC's "Waterfalls"), the group released their self-titled debut album, which produced the hit single "Blackberry Molasses". However, the album did not follow in the same success and despite a second album being produced by Tim & Bob, it was never released. Due to management issues the group split in 1997. Wilson later enrolled at Clark Atlanta University majoring in mass communications. While in school, Wilson continued to record in his free time in hopes of one day returning to the stage.

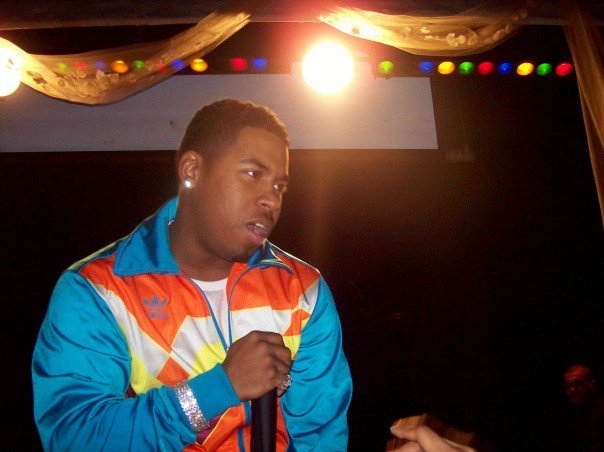
Bobby V performing in Southeast Missouri State University during the Xi Gamma chapter of Alpha Phi Alpha's Miss Black and Gold Pageant, 2006

=== 2005–2007: Debut album and Special Occasion ===
Bobby Valentino was released in the spring of 2005 through Island Def Jam and Ludacris' Disturbing tha Peace label and was certified gold by the RIAA selling over 708,000 copies in the United States. Primarily produced by hitmakers Tim & Bob, his first single, "Slow Down", became a Top 10 hit on the U.S. Billboard Hot 100 chart and a number one R&B single on the Billboard R&B Singles chart receiving a large amount of radio and TV airplay. Also in 2005, he joined Bow Wow, Omarion, Marques Houston, B5 and Pretty Ricky on the Scream Tour IV. After the success of "Slow Down", he released a second single, a remix of his song "Tell Me" featuring Lil Wayne, produced by Tim & Bob as well. The album's third and final single, "My Angel", was released in the fall of 2005, however it gained little popularity. Gearing up for the release of his 2007 sophomore effort Special Occasion, Bobby V released the album's first single titled "Turn the Page" to mixed reviews. Its second single, "Anonymous" featuring Timbaland, was released on April 9, 2007. Overall, the album received positive reviews from critics. He later returned to his pier appearing on the debut episode of MTV's Once Upon A Prom, which aired on May 19, 2007.

=== 2008–2009: New label and The Rebirth ===
In early 2008, Bobby V confirmed that he was no longer signed to either Def Jam or Disturbing tha Peace during an interview with DJBooth.net. He stated:

The decision to leave [the label] was totally mine. I sat down with Ludacris and Chaka Zulu, and I explained to them that it was time for me to venture out on my own. They had no problem with it; they are cool with it, no beef at all.

Around this time, British musician Bobby Valentino brought an action against the Bobby V (then billed as "Bobby Valentino") and his then-record label Def Jam for "Passing off, trademark infringement, and breach of contract, in relation to record sales, recorded content, and artist's live performances".

Due to the poor album sales of the second album, Special Occasion's failing to reach gold or platinum sales, Bobby V was reportedly frustrated with the album's delays and less than expected sales, culminating in his decision to leave the labels. Although business ties have been severed, Bobby V maintains positive relationships with CEO Chaka Zulu, Ludacris and the Disturbing tha Peace/Def Jam staff. In April 2008, Come with Me was released through digital outlets and featured the single "Another Life". In July 2008, three months after being dropped from Def Jam Recordings and leaving Disturbing tha Peace Records, Bobby V signed a new deal with EMI, which will house his imprint Blu Kolla Dreams. In regards to the label his manager and co-CEO of Blu Kolla Dreams Courtney "Colt Luv" Stewart stated:

Blu Kolla Dreams is the start of a new business venture for anyone who has taken the Blu Kolla approach and worked extremely hard over time to make an impact in their communities, achieve greatness and make their dreams come true.

Later that year, Bobby V announced his third album, The Rebirth. Regarding its release, he stated:

I have been blessed to be in the music industry for over 10 years, and my past endeavors have been great learning experiences. Now I have the opportunity to step out on faith and use the knowledge and experience that I have gained to take my career to the next level.

The Rebirth was released on February 10, 2009, under his new stage name "Bobby V". The album's first single, "Beep" (featuring Yung Joc), was released via iTunes on October 7, 2008. In the fall of 2009, Bobby V performed under his new alias at Rutgers University's Hot Dog Knight. V's third studio album features production by Tim & Bob, Raphael Saadiq, Carlos McKinney and Big Fruit.

=== 2010–present ===
Bobby V released his fourth studio album, Fly on the Wall, on March 22, 2011. The first single was "Phone #", which features rapper Plies and was produced by Jazze Pha. In December 2010, Bobby V released his second single "Words" off of "Fly on the Wall". In February 2011, Bobby V released his third single "Rock Wit'cha", a remake from Bobby Brown's 1989 album Don't Be Cruel. "Grab Somebody'", which features rapper Twista was his fourth single. Bobby V later appeared alongside rappers Nicki Minaj and Lil Wayne on the song "Sex in the Lounge" from Minaj's second album, Pink Friday: Roman Reloaded. In May 2012, Bobby V released the first single from his album Dusk Till Dawn, titled "Mirror", which features rapper Lil Wayne. On October 16, 2012. Dusk Till Dawn was released. The album sold 50 000 copies in the first week.

In April 2013, Bobby V announced that he was working on a new project, Peach Moon. The first single from Peach Moon was "Back To Love". Bobby V released Peach Moon on December 10, 2013. On January 28, 2015, Bobby V was featured in a single released by Gotti, called "I Need a Girl." In January 2016, Bobby V made a partnership with Michael Caseau to aid in media direction, investments, and management. Also in 2016, he released the soundtrack to the BET film Hollywood Hearts.

In September 2017, Bobby V signed a new label deal with SoNo Recording Group distributed by Universal Music Group. The label reunites him with record producer and A&R man Tim Kelley, who co-produced his 2005 debut, Disturbing Tha Peace Presents Bobby Valentino. The new album Electrik which was produced entirely by Tim Kelley, was released on March 9, 2018. The album debuted on the Billboard R&B Album Chart at number seven. Electrik includes a collaboration with Snoop Dogg on the album's first single "Lil' Bit".

In June 2022, Bobby V participated in Verzuz, paired with Ray J and went against Sammie with Pleasure P. Their segment went viral for multiple reasons, resulting in the four singers to meet virtually on social media where they came together and develop a R&B supergroup R.S.V.P, which currently is in development.

== Personal life ==
Wilson has one child: a daughter born in 2017.

== Discography ==
Studio albums

- Disturbing tha Peace Presents Bobby Valentino (2005)
- Special Occasion (2007)
- The Rebirth (2009)
- Fly on the Wall (2011)
- Dusk Till Dawn (2012)
- Electrik (2018)

== Filmography ==
- Hollywood Hearts (TV movie; 2016)

== Awards and nominations ==
- Urban Music Awards
  - 2009, Urban Music Award for Best Male Artist (won)
  - 2009, Urban Music Award for Best R&B Act (won)
- NAACP Image Awards
  - 2006, Outstanding New Artist (nominated)
- Soul Train Music Awards
  - 2006, Best R&B/Soul Single, Male: "Slow Down" (nominated)
  - 2006, Best R&B/Soul or Rap New Artist (nominated)
- Vibe Awards
  - 2005, Reelest Video: "Pimpin' All Over the World" (nominated)
- BMI Awards
  - 2005, Song of the Year: "Slow Down" (won)
