= Fly on the Wall (Bobby V album) =

Studio album by Bobby V
- Released: March 22, 2011
- Genre: R&B
- Length: 67:06
- Labels: Blu Kolla Dreams; Capitol
- Producers: Tim & Bob; Bobby V; The Pentagon; Jeff B.; Bryan-Michael Cox; Jazze Pha; Los Da Mystro; Hit-Boy; Stevie J

Bobby V chronology
| The Rebirth (2009) | Fly on the Wall (2011) | Dusk Till Dawn (2012) |

Singles from Fly on the Wall
- 1. "Phone #" Released: September 21, 2010; 2. "Words" Released: December 3, 2010; 3. "Rock Wit'cha" Released: February 15, 2011

Fly on the Wall is the fourth album by American R&B singer Bobby V. It was released on March 22, 2011, through Blu Kolla Dreams and Capitol Records, marking his second album released through his own Blu Kolla Dreams label. The album features production from longtime collaborators Tim & Bob, as well as Bryan-Michael Cox, The Pentagon, Jazze Pha, Los da Mystro, and Bobby V. Guest appearances include rappers 50 Cent, Lloyd Banks, Cyhi Da Prynce, Plies, and Twista.

The album received mixed reviews, with critics praising its polished R&B production and romantic material while criticizing Bobby V's vocal control, repetitive songwriting, and the album's lengthy runtime. Commercially, it debuted at number nine on the US Billboard 200 with 38,000 first-week sales, marking his fourth consecutive top-ten album, while peaking at number four on the Top R&B/Hip-Hop Albums. Fly on the Wall spawned four singles, with "Words," the album's second single, becoming its highest-charting song, reaching number 23 on the US Hot R&B/Hip-Hop Songs.

== Promotion ==
Blu Kolla Dreams and Capitol Records released four singles in support of the album. The album's lead single, "Phone #", featuring rapper Plies, was released on July 6, 2010. Produced by Jazze Pha, it reached number 55 on the Billboard R&B/Hip-Hop Songs chart. The second single, "Words", was released on December 3, 2010, and produced by The Pentagon. It peaked at number 23 on the same chart, becoming the album's highest-charting single, while its official remix featured R. Kelly. The third single, a remake of Bobby Brown's 1989 hit "Rock Wit'cha", was released on February 15, 2011. Bobby V and Brown performed the song together on Lopez Tonight on February 23, 2011. The fourth single, "Grab Somebody", features rapper Twista.

== Critical reception ==
Professional ratings
Review scores
| Source | Rating |
|---|---|
| About.com | 2/5 stars |
| AllMusic | 3.5/5 stars |
| Parlé | 4/5 |

Mark Edward Nero from About.com gave the album a largely negative review, criticizing Bobby V's vocal control and tendency to stray from the melody despite the album's polished production. He found the material largely repetitive and unremarkable, though he praised the cover of Bobby Brown's "Rock Wit'cha" and the romantic track "Words" as standout moments.} Andy Kellman of AllMusic viewed Fly on the Wall more favorably, noting that Bobby V largely refined rather than reinvented his established R&B sound. He praised the album's mix of seductive ballads and harder-edged tracks, while noting that its 67-minute runtime resulted in some unnecessary material. Writing for Parlé, Diamond Bradley described the album as a strongly sensual and sexually charged, praising its smooth production and romantic material. He highlighted tracks such as "Hang On," "Heaven," and "Words," with particular praise for the latter's more relaxed, romantic approach, while noting that the album's emphasis on sexual themes sometimes came at the expense of more traditionally chivalrous love songs.

== Commercial performance ==
Fly on the Wall debuted at number nine on the US Billboard 200 with first-week sales of 38,000 copies, marking Bobby V's fourth consecutive album to reach the chart's top ten. It also peaked at number four on the Top R&B/Hip-Hop Albums, making it his first album not to top the chart, and ranked at number 78 on the chart's 2011 year-end listing.

== Track listing ==
Fly on the Wall track listing
| No. | Title | Writer(s) | Producer(s) | Length |
|---|---|---|---|---|
| 1. | "Fly on the Wall (Intro)" | Bobby Wilson; Tim Kelly; Bob Robinson | Tim & Bob | 2:29 |
| 2. | "Are You the Right One" | Wilson; Bryan-Michael Cox; Bertell Young | Cox | 4:02 |
| 3. | "Words" | Wilson; Antonio Dixon; Eric Dawkins; Damon Thomas | The Underdogs | 3:50 |
| 4. | "If I Can't Have You" | Wilson; Kelly; Robinson | Tim & Bob | 5:04 |
| 5. | "Sweetness" | Wilson; Jeff Bowden; Jeffrey Coleman | Jeff B. | 3:55 |
| 6. | "Would You Be" | Wilson; Kelly; Robinson | Tim & Bob | 4:50 |
| 7. | "Rock Wit'cha" | Kenny Edmonds; Daryl Simmons | The Pentagon | 4:18 |
| 8. | "Hang On" | Wilson; Dixon; Dawkins; Thomas | The Underdogs | 4:05 |
| 9. | "Fly on the Wall (Interlude)" | Wilson; Kelly; Robinson | Tim & Bob | 1:16 |
| 10. | "Altered Ego" (featuring 50 Cent) | Phalon Alexander; Patrick Hayes; Gasner Hughes; Jevon Sims; Curtis Jackson | Jazze Pha | 2:53 |
| 11. | "L.O.V.E." | Wilson; Kelly; Robinson | Tim & Bob | 4:33 |
| 12. | "Hummin'" (featuring Lloyd Banks) | Wilson; Carlos McKinney; Tony Scales; Christopher Lloyd | Los Da Mystro | 3:51 |
| 13. | "Outfit" (featuring Cyhi Da Prynce) | Wilson; Adonis Shropshire; Cydel Young; Brandon Carr; Chauncey Hollis | Hit-Boy; Carr | 3:21 |
| 14. | "Grab Somebody" (featuring Twista) | Wilson; Daen Simmons; Carl Mitchell | Simmons | 3:45 |
| 15. | "Phone #" (featuring Plies) | Wilson; Alexander; [Plies (rapper); Algernod Washington; Sims; Hayes | Pha | 3:44 |
| 16. | "Last Call for Love" | Wilson; Leland "Big Fruit" Clopton | Clopton | 3:28 |
| 17. | "Heaven (My Angel, Part 2)" | Wilson; Kelly; Robinson; Steven Jordan | Tim & Bob; Stevie J | 5:44 |
| 18. | "Thank You" | Wilson; Kelly; Robinson | Tim & Bob | 1:49 |

== Charts ==
=== Weekly charts ===
Weekly chart performance for Fly on the Wall
| Chart (2011) | Peak position |
|---|---|
| US Billboard 200 | 9 |
| US Top R&B/Hip-Hop Albums (Billboard) | 4 |

=== Year-end charts ===
Year-end chart performance for Fly on the Wall
| Chart (2011) | Position |
|---|---|
| US Top R&B/Hip-Hop Albums (Billboard) | 78 |
