= Slow Down (Bobby Valentino song) =

2005 single by Bobby Valentino

Single by Bobby Valentino

from the album Bobby Valentino
- B-side: "Give Me a Chance"; "You and Me"
- Released: February 14, 2005
- Studio: Record Plant (Hollywood, California)
- Length: 4:18 (album version); 3:56 (radio edit)
- Label: Disturbing tha Peace; Def Jam
- Songwriters: Tim Kelley; Bob Robinson; Bobby Wilson
- Producer: Tim & Bob

Bobby Valentino singles chronology
"Slow Down" (2005)	"Tell Me" (2005)

"Slow Down" is the debut single of American singer Bobby Valentino, released from his first self-titled album, Bobby Valentino, on February 14, 2005. Produced by Tim & Bob, the song spent four consecutive weeks at number one on the US Billboard Hot R&B/Hip-Hop Songs chart and has since been certified gold by the Recording Industry Association of America (RIAA). "Slow Down" also peaked at number eight on the Billboard Hot 100 as well as number four in the United Kingdom. The music video was directed by Erik White.

== Release and reception ==
"Slow Down" was serviced to US rhythmic contemporary and urban radio on February 14, 2005. Prior to this, the song received enough early airplay on these formats to debut at number 63 on the US Billboard Hot R&B/Hip-Hop Singles & Tracks chart in December 2004 and climb to number 54 two days prior to its release. Afterwards, the song rose up the chart, reaching number one on May 7, 2005, and staying there for four weeks. On the Billboard Hot 100, the song first charted in March 2005 and peaked at number eight on May 21, staying on the ranking for 22 weeks. The single also appeared on the Billboard Rhythmic Top 40 chart, where it also reached number eight. It finished 2005 at number 47 on the Hot 100 year-end chart and at number six on the annual R&B listing.

On June 20, 2005, "Slow Down" was released in the United Kingdom as a 12-inch single and a CD single. Six days later, it debuted and peaked at number four on the UK Singles Chart, becoming Valentino's only top-20 single in the UK and spending 12 weeks in the top 100. It went on to become the UK's 77th-best-selling hit of 2005. Across Europe, the single entered the top 40 in Germany, Ireland, and Switzerland, placing at number 13 on the Eurochart Hot 100. In Australia, a CD single was issued on July 4, 2005, but it did not appear within the ARIA Singles Chart top 100. "Slow Down" has been certified gold by the RIAA and platinum by the British Phonographic Industry (BPI).

== Track listings ==
US 12-inch single

1. "Slow Down" (radio)
2. "Slow Down" (LP)
3. "Slow Down" (instrumental)

UK CD single

1. "Slow Down" (album version) – 4:20
2. "Give Me a Chance" (featuring Ludacris) – 4:43
3. "You and Me" – 4:35

UK 12-inch single

A1. "Slow Down" (12-inch version) – 4:20
A2. "Slow Down" (instrumental) – 4:20
B1. "Give Me a Chance" (featuring Ludacris) – 4:43

European CD single

1. "Slow Down" (album version) – 4:20
2. "Slow Down" (instrumental) – 4:20

Australian CD single

1. "Slow Down" (radio edit) – 3:55
2. "Slow Down" (12-inch version) – 4:20
3. "Give Me a Chance" (album version featuring Ludacris) – 4:48
4. "Slow Down" (video)

== Credits and personnel ==
Credits are lifted from the European CD single liner notes.

Studios

- Recorded at Record Plant (Hollywood, California)
- Mixed at Studio Atlantis (Los Angeles)
- Mastered at Glenn Schick Mastering (Atlanta, Georgia, US)

Personnel

- Tim & Bob – production
  - Tim Kelley – writing, drum programming and keys, recording, mixing
  - Bob Robinson – writing, guitars
- Bobby Valentino – writing (as Bobby Wilson)
- Jun Ishizeki – recording
- Kevin "KD" Davis – mixing
- Glenn Schick – mastering

== Charts ==
=== Weekly charts ===
Chart (2005)	Peak position
Europe (Eurochart Hot 100)	13
France (SNEP)	42
Germany (GfK)	31
Ireland (IRMA)	31
Netherlands (Urban Top 100)	22
Scotland Singles (Official Charts)	19
Switzerland (Schweizer Hitparade)	35
UK Singles (Official Charts)	4
UK Hip Hop/R&B (Official Charts)	2
US Billboard Hot 100	8
US Hot R&B/Hip-Hop Songs (Billboard)	1
US Rhythmic Airplay (Billboard)	8

=== Year-end charts ===
Chart (2005)	Position
UK Singles (OCC)	77
UK Urban (Music Week)	2
US Billboard Hot 100	47
US Hot R&B/Hip-Hop Songs (Billboard)	6
US Rhythmic Top 40 (Billboard)	28

== Certifications ==
Region	Certification	Certified units/sales
United Kingdom (BPI)	Platinum	600,000^{‡}
United States (RIAA)	Gold	500,000^{^}
^{^} Shipments figures based on certification alone.^{‡} Sales+streaming figures based on certification alone.

== Release history ==
Region	Date	Format(s)	Label(s)	Ref.
United States	February 14, 2005	Rhythmic contemporary; urban radio	Disturbing tha Peace	
United States	April 5, 2005	Contemporary hit radio	Disturbing tha Peace	
United Kingdom	June 20, 2005	12-inch vinyl; CD	Disturbing tha Peace; Def Jam	
Australia	July 4, 2005	CD	Disturbing tha Peace; Def Jam	
