= Special Occasion (Bobby Valentino album) =

Studio album by Bobby Valentino
- Released: May 8, 2007
- Length: 65:38
- Labels: Disturbing tha Peace; Def Jam
- Producers: Darrell "Delite" Allamby; The Clutch; Bryan-Michael Cox; Dre & Vidal; Emile; Sean Garrett; Rodney Jerkins; Erik Nelson; Tim & Bob; Timbaland; Don Vito

Bobby Valentino chronology
Bobby Valentino (2005)	Special Occasion (2007)	Come with Me (2008)

Singles from Special Occasion
- 1. "Turn the Page" Released: October 10, 2006; 2. "Anonymous" Released: April 9, 2007

Special Occasion is the second studio album by American R&B singer Bobby Valentino. It was released by Disturbing tha Peace and Def Jam Recordings on May 8, 2007, in the United States. The singer co-wrote over three quarters of the album, which also features songwriting and production from Tim & Bob, Rodney "Darkchild" Jerkins, Timbaland, Sean Garrett, Don Vito, Bryan-Michael Cox and Dre & Vidal. It also features guest appearances by Ludacris, Timbaland and Fabolous.

The album earned mixed to positive reviews from music critics. Special Occasion debuted at number 3 on the US Billboard 200, selling about 92,000 copies in its first week. It also peaked at the top of the Billboard Top R&B/Hip-Hop Albums. By mid-2009, the album had sold approximately 270,000 copies in the US. Special Occasion produced two singles, including lead single "Turn the Page" and follow-up "Anonymous" featuring Timbaland, the latter of which reached the top 20 on the US Hot R&B/Hip-Hop Songs chart.

== Promotion ==
Special Occasion's first official single was the Rodney Jerkins-produced track "Turn the Page." A ballad that features Valentino singing about trust and taking risks in a relationship, it peaked at number 63 on US Hot R&B/Hip-Hop Songs chart, becoming his lowest-charting single by then. Follow-up single "Anonymous," produced and featuring Timbaland, reached number 49 on the US Billboard Hot 100, but was more successful on both the Hot R&B/Hip-Hop Songs and the UK Singles Chart, where it peaked at number 17 and number 25, respectively.

== Critical reception ==
Professional ratings
Review scores
Source	Rating
About.com	2/5 stars
AllMusic	3/5 stars
Artistdirect	3/5 stars
Blender	3.5/5 stars
Daily Press	3.5/5 stars
DJBooth.net	4/5 stars
Entertainment Weekly	B−
USA Today	2.5/4 stars

Vibe editor Damien Scott called Special Occasion a "cohesive collection of modern ballads. Valentino carves his own lane – a fusion of early ’90’s R&B; with new millennium aesthetics, like Tevin Campbell with a sidekick. As a result, Occasion is light on club-tailored tracks, and thankfully so." AllMusic editor Sharon Mawer described the album as a "slice of modern urban R&B [...] which was a series of 16 songs with Bobby making love to the microphone over a sensual beat and even more sexual strings." Billboard remarked: "On his re-created sophomore set, the DTP crooner returns with heartfelt ballads and midtempo tunes full of superlative production."

Blender critic Ben Sisario felt that while "none of the songs on this second album are particularly memorable, Valentino’s actorly dedication keeps it appealing. Playing the pickup artist with mirrored shades and a dry, cool tenor, Bobby never breaks character or loses the vibe — it’s a cheesy role, but a seductive one as well." Entertainment Weekly's Simon Vozick-Levinson found that he "oozes suave confidence on his second set of romantic whispers, but Bobby Valentino's self-assured attitude isn't always enough to sell these songs. He gets a boost early on from a pair of effervescent Timbaland co-productions, "Anonymous" and "Rearview (Ridin');" as soon as the tempos slow, though, Valentino's vocals start losing pep. By the disc's halfway point, he's reached a soporific low."

== Commercial performance ==
Special Occasion was set to be released on December 12, 2006, but was delayed until May 8, 2007. It eventually debuted at number 3 on the US Billboard 200 in the week of May 26, 2007, selling 92,000 copies in its first week, just over one-half of his previous album's first-week sales. Special Occasion also peaked at the top of the Billboard Top R&B/Hip-Hop Albums, becoming his second consecutive album to do so. By mid-2009, the album had sold approximately 270,000 copies in the US.

== Track listing ==
Special Occasion track listing
No.	Title	Writer(s)	Producer(s)	Length
1.	"Intro"	Bobby Wilson; Lincoln Browder; Darrell "Delite" Allamby	Allamby	0:38
2.	"Anonymous" (featuring Timbaland)	Timothy Mosley; Jerome Harmon; King Logan; Ezekiel Lewis; Edna Lewis; Candice Nelson; Balewa Muhammad; Patrick "J. Que" Smith	Timbaland; Harmon^{[a]}; Logan^{[a]}	4:43
3.	"Checkin' for Me"	Wilson; Emile Ghantous; Erik Nelson; R. Castro; D. Simmons	Emile; Nelson	4:07
4.	"Special Occasion" (Interlude)	Wilson; Tim Kelley; Bob Robinson	Tim & Bob	2:00
5.	"Rearview (Ridin')" (featuring Ludacris)	Mosley; Harmon; Logan; Lewis; Nelson; Muhammad; Smith; Chris Bridges	Timbaland; Harmon^{[a]}; Logan^{[a]}	3:46
6.	"If I Had My Way"	Rodney Jerkins; Fred Jerkins III; Antea Birchett; L. Danielsson	R. Jerkins	3:23
7.	"How 'Bout It"	Wilson; Bryan-Michael Cox; Kendrick "Wyldcard" Dean; Willie L. Lucas	Cox; Dean^{[a]}	3:48
8.	"Turn the Page"	R. Jerkins; L. Danielsson; John "Jon Jon" Webb, Jr.	R. Jerkins	4:22
9.	"Home Is Where You Belong"	Wilson; Lincoln Browder; Allamby	Allamby	5:14
10.	"Let Him Go" (featuring Fabolous)	Wilson; Andre Harris; Vidal Davis; John Jackson; Ryan Toby	Dre & Vidal	4:45
11.	"Only Human"	Wilson; Kelley; Robinson; Shawn Colvin; John Leventhal	Tim & Bob	4:33
12.	"Can't Wait 'Til Later"	Wilson; Kelley; Robinson	Tim & Bob	4:57
13.	"I Was Wrong"	Kelley; Robinson	Tim & Bob	4:43
14.	"Soon As I Get Home"	Kenneth “Babyface” Edmonds	Tim & Bob	5:28
15.	"Over & Over"	Wilson; Browder; Allamby	Allamby	7:54
16.	"Right There (Thank You)"	Wilson; Kelley; Robinson	Tim & Bob	1:19

Target/International bonus track
No.	Title	Writer(s)	Producer(s)	Length
17.	"Wreck"	Garrett	Sean Garrett	4:06

Circuit City bonus track
No.	Title	Writer(s)	Producer(s)	Length
18.	"Let's Go"	Lewis; Nelson; Muhammad; Smith; Keri Hilson	Don Vito; The Clutch	3:37

Notes

- ^{^a} denotes co-producer

Sample credits

- “Only Human” contains a sample from “Sunny Came Home" as performed by Shawn Colvin.
- ”Soon As I Get Home” originally performed by Babyface.

== Personnel ==
Credits adapted from the album's liner notes.

- Bobby V – Lead Vocals, Background Vocals, Vocal arranger
- Darrell "Delite" Allamby – Recording Engineer, Music Programming, Other Instruments, Background Vocals, Audio Mixing
- Kori Anders – Recording Engineer, Audio Mixing Assistant
- Alex "A.J." Angol – Additional Guitars
- Marcella Araica – Recording Engineer, Audio Mixing
- Ben Arrindell – Audio Mixing
- Anesha Birchett – Background Vocals
- Leslie Braithwaite – Audio Mixing
- Lincoln “Link” Browder – Background Vocals
- Bryan-Michael Cox – Music Programming, Drums, Bass played by, Piano, Additional Keyboards
- Darkchild – Recording Engineer, Instruments
- Das – Vocal Producer
- Kevin Davis – Audio Mixing
- Kendrick "Wyldcard" Dean – Strings, Additional Keyboards
- Vincent DiLorenzo – Recording Engineer, Audio Mixing
- Fabolous – Rap Vocals
- Emile Ghantous (of The Insomniax) – Recording Engineer, Vocal arranger
- Erik Nelson (of The Insomniax) – Recording Engineer, Vocal arranger
- Andrew Haller – Recording Engineer, Audio Mixing Assistant
- Jean Marie Horvat – Audio Mixing
- Bill Jabr – Guitar
- Jon Jon – Other Instruments
- Tim Kelley – Drums, Drum Machine, Percussion, Acoustic Guitar, Bass, Keyboards, Audio Mixing
- Ludacris – Rap Vocals
- Patrick Magee – Recording Engineer
- Joshua Monroy – Recording Engineer
- Paul Osborn – Recording Engineer
- Bob Robinson – Minimoog Percussion, Electric Guitar, Acoustic Guitar, Bass, Acoustic Piano, Keyboards
- Andros Rodriguez – Recording Engineer
- Dave Russell – Audio Mixing
- Tim Stewart – Guitar
- Corey Stocker – Recording Engineer
- Sam Thomas – Recording Engineer, Audio Mixing
- Timbaland – Rap Vocals
- Justin Trawick – Audio Mixing Assistant
- Mike Tsarfati – Audio Mixing Assistant
- Jeff Villanueva – Recording Engineer, Audio Mixing

== Charts ==
=== Weekly charts ===
Weekly chart performance for Special Occasion
Chart (2007)	Peak position
US Billboard 200	3
US Top R&B/Hip-Hop Albums (Billboard)	1

=== Year-end charts ===
Year-end chart performance for Special Occasion
Chart (2007)	Position
US Top R&B/Hip-Hop Albums (Billboard)	51

== Release history ==
Special Occasion release history
Region	Date	Format(s)	Label
United States	May 8, 2007	CD; digital download	Disturbing tha Peace; Def Jam
United Kingdom	May 14, 2007	CD; digital download	Disturbing tha Peace; Def Jam
