= Witness protection (disambiguation) =

Witness protection is security provided to a threatened person providing testimonial evidence to the justice system.

Witness protection may also refer to:

- Witness Protection (album), a 2008 album by Dave Hollister
- Witness Protection (film), a 1999 American film
