= Real Talk (Dave Hollister album) =

Studio album by Dave Hollister
- Released: November 11, 2003
- Studio: DreamWorks
- Genre: R&B
- Length: 49:46

Dave Hollister chronology
Things in the Game Done Changed (2002)	Real Talk (2003)	The Book of David: Vol.1 – The Transition (2006)

Real Talk is the fourth studio album by American singer Dave Hollister. It was released by DreamWorks Records on November 11, 2003, in the United States.

== Critical reception ==
Professional ratings
Review scores
Source	Rating
AllMusic	3.5/5 stars
Vibe	3/5 stars

Allmusic editor Andy Kellman found that "this fourth album is only outshined by Ghetto Hymns as Hollister's best [...] It's a lean album with plenty of dimensions and little in the way of wasted moments. Hollister makes every second count, and while there might be a few lines that make you scratch your head – such as "I need you as bad as old folks need soft shoes" – Real Talk forges the singer's status as one of the most consistent, down-to-earth figures in contemporary R&B." Jason King from Vibe felt that "Hollister may be blessed with a passionate, churchy singing voice, but his sensibility is much more hip hop than gospel or R&B" and while his "earnest spirit shines through, he doesn’t demonstrate the faith needed to take true musical risks."

== Track listing ==
No.	Title	Writer(s)	Producer(s)	Length
1.	"The Big Payback"	Donny Harrell; Durrell Babbs; Fred Wesley; James Brown; John Starks	Tank; The Rocket	3:22
2.	"Bad When U Broke"	Dave Hollister; Harrell; Theron Feemster; Terron Mitchell	Feemster	3:29
3.	"Never Gonna Change"	Dave Young; Harrell; Tyquan Walker	Bink; Walker	3:55
4.	"Good Ole Ghetto"	Dave Hollister; Bryan Michael Cox; Dave Young; Luther Vandross	Cox	4:00
5.	"Real Talk"	Michael Flowers	Mike City	4:34
6.	"Reason With Your Body"	Harrell; Babbs; Joseph Bereal; Leon Swan	The Rocket	3:52
7.	"Winning With You" (featuring R-N-La)	Deltrick Ford; Harrell; Babbs; J. Bereal	Michael Bereal; Tank	4:21
8.	"Karma"	K. Mosby; Harrell; Babbs	Tank	3:44
9.	"Case Is Closed"	Harrell; Babbs; J. Bereal; Swan	The Rocket	3:55
10.	"Almost"	Michael Flowers	Mike City	3:57
11.	"I Lied"	Harrell; Babbs	Tank	4:15
12.	"Pleased Tonight"	Ford; Harrell; Babbs; J. Bereal	Tank; M. Bereal	6:22

Sample credits

- "The Big Payback" contains a sample of "The Big Payback", performed by James Brown.

== Charts ==
Chart (2003)	Peak position
US Billboard 200	42
US Top R&B/Hip-Hop Albums (Billboard)	23
