= Find Myself in You =

Single by Brian McKnight

from the album Ten
- Released: 2006
- Genre: R&B
- Length: 3:45
- Label: Warner Bros.
- Songwriter(s): McKnight
- Producer(s): DelValle, Joselito; McKnight, Brian

Brian McKnight singles chronology
"Everytime You Go Away" (2005)	"Find Myself in You" (2006)	"Used to Be My Girl" (2006)

"Find Myself in You" is a song by American singer Brian McKnight. Written and produced by McKnight, it was released as a single from the original soundtrack to the comedy-drama film Madea's Family Reunion in February 2006. The song reached number 27 on the US Billboard Hot R&B/Hip-Hop Songs chart. It was also included in his album, Ten released in December of that year.

== Formats and track listings ==
Digital single
No.	Title	Length
1.	"Find Myself in You" (Radio Edit)	3:45
2.	"Find Myself in You" (Main Version)	4:50

== Charts ==
=== Weekly charts ===
Chart (2006)	Peak position
US Bubbling Under Hot 100 Singles (Billboard)	9
US Hot R&B/Hip-Hop Songs (Billboard)	27

=== Year-end charts ===
Chart (2006)	Position
US Hot R&B/Hip-Hop Songs (Billboard)	41
