= Chicago '85... The Movie =

Studio album by Dave Hollister
- Released: November 21, 2000
- Genre: R&B
- Length: 57:27
- Label: DreamWorks
- Producer: Mike City; Vidal Davis; Steve Huff; Gimel Keaton; Kevin Jackson; Walter Millsap III; Eugene Peoples; Tank; Chucky Thompson; Tim & Bob; Ricky White

Dave Hollister chronology
Ghetto Hymns (1999)	Chicago '85... The Movie (2000)	Things in the Game Done Changed (2002)

Singles from Chicago '85... The Movie
- 1. "One Woman Man" Released: October 14, 2000; 2. "Take Care of Home" Released: April 2, 2001

Professional ratings
Review scores
Source	Rating
AllMusic	3/5 stars
USA Today	2.5/4 stars

Chicago '85... The Movie is the second studio album by American contemporary R&B singer Dave Hollister. It was released by DreamWorks Records on November 21, 2000, in the United States. Produced by Hollister himself, it peaked at number 49 on the US Billboard 200 and number 10 on the Top R&B/Hip-Hop Albums chart.

Two singles were released from the album: "One Woman Man" and "Take Care of Home". "One Woman Man" was the most successful single from the album, peaking at number 44 on the Billboard Hot 100. Chicago '85... The Movie was certified gold by the Recording Industry Association of America (RIAA) on February 14, 2001.

== Track listing ==
Chicago '85...
No.	Title	Writer(s)	Producer(s)	Length
1.	"Interlude (I'm Not Complete)"	Kevin Jackson; Ricky White	Jackson; White; Tank	0:47
2.	"Keep on Lovin'"	Michael Flowers	Mike City	4:35
3.	"Take Care of Home"	Tim Kelley; Bob Robinson	Tim & Bob	4:16
4.	"One Woman Man"	Flowers	City	4:31
5.	"We've Come Too Far"	Kelley; Robinson	Tim & Bob	4:46
6.	"You Can't Say"	Steve Huff	Huff	4:10
7.	"Yo Baby's Daddy"	Prathan Williams; Eugene Peoples	Eugene Peoples	3:28
8.	"Don't Take My Girl Away"	Candice Nelson	Walter Millsap III	4:32
9.	"Destiny"	Kelley; Robinson	Tim & Bob	4:53
10.	"Doin' Wrong"	Durrell Babbs; Gimel Keaton; Jim Mullen; Chucky Thompson	Gimel Keaton; Thompson	4:11
11.	"On the Side"	Babbs	Tank	3:38
12.	"A Woman Will"	Huff	Huff	4:09
13.	"I Don't Want to Be a Hustler"	Dave Hollister; Vidal Davis; Ryan Toby	Davis	4:32
14.	"I'm Not Complete"	Jackson; White	Jackson; White; Tank	4:59
Total length:				57:27

Samples

- "Doin' Wrong" contains a sample of "Cape Wrath" by Morrissey–Mullen.

== Charts ==
=== Weekly charts ===
Chart (2000)	Peak position
US Billboard 200	49
US Top R&B/Hip-Hop Albums (Billboard)	10

=== Year-end charts ===
Chart (2001)	Position
US Billboard 200	146
US Top R&B/Hip-Hop Albums (Billboard)	41

== Certifications ==
Region	Certification	Certified units/sales
United States (RIAA)	Gold	500,000^{^}
^{^} Shipments figures based on certification alone.
