= Evolution of a Man =

Studio album by Brian McKnight
- Released: October 27, 2009
- Length: 49:48
- Label: E1 Music
- Producer: Brian McKnight

Brian McKnight chronology
I'll Be Home for Christmas (2008)	Evolution of a Man (2009)	Just Me (2011)

Evolution of a Man is the eleventh studio album by Brian McKnight. It was released by E1 Music on October 27, 2009 in the United States. McKnight worked with singers Jill Scott and Stevie Wonder on the album. It received mixed reviews upon its release and peaked at number three on the US Top R&B/Hip-Hop Albums chart. The first single, "What I've Been Waiting For", was officially released on August 21, 2009.

== Critical reception ==
Professional ratings
Aggregate scores
Source	Rating
Metacritic	65/100
Review scores
Source	Rating
About.com	4/5 stars
AllMusic	2.5/5 stars
Entertainment Weekly	B−

Evolution of a Man received positive reviews from critics. At Metacritic, which assigns a normalized rating out of 100 to reviews from mainstream critics, the album has an average score of 65 based on four reviews. In his review for AllMusic, editor Andy Kellman described Evolution of a Man as "predominantly slow, sparse, and intimate," noting that while much of it offers familiar, comforting McKnight fare, some tracks take risks with minimal instrumentation, making the album "more a collection of loose sketches than a highly polished set" that may not hold up to repeated listening. Gail Mitchell, writing for Billboard, found that on Evolution of a Man, McKnight returned to his "original bread-and-butter gig" with a "mood-setting mix of midtempo cuts and ballads." She noted the album was "not groundbreaking" and included "two distracting interstitials," but concluded it shows McKnight "still has a way with the ladies."

Nate Chinen wrote that on Evolution of a Man, Brian McKnight blends "smoldering sensuality and unguarded chivalry" with his "sleek and marvelously flexible" voice, delivering sincere, adult-contemporary R&B, though touches like Auto-Tune and club synths reveal minor flaws in an otherwise "impeccably polished" album. Entertainment Weekly's Mikael Wood wrote that the album was "far less crass" than its radio-show–themed opener, with McKnight expressing rare introspection on songs like "Just a Little Bit," though he "occasionally [...] could use some edge." Melody Charles form SoulTracks wrote that Evolution of a Man was "perfectly pleasing, yet pedestrian." She concluded that "the smooth, formulaic R&B" lacked spontaneity or edge.

== Commercial performance ==
Evolution of a Man debuted and peaked at number 20 on the US Billboard 200, becoming McKnight's highest charting album since 2005's Gemini. It also reached number three on Billboard's Top R&B/Hip-Hop Albums chart, his eighth album to enter the chart's top ten.

== Track listing ==
All tracks are produced by Brian McKnight.

Evolution of a Man track listing
No.	Title	Length
1.	"The Brian McKnight Show"	1:28
2.	"Just a Little Bit"	4:16
3.	"I Betchaneva"	4:19
4.	"What I've Been Waiting for"	3:59
5.	"When Ur Lovin' Me"	4:02
6.	"Never Say Goodbye"	3:58
7.	"Stay Tuned"	0:12
8.	"Next 2 U"	4:31
9.	"I Miss You"	3:46
10.	"Always Be My Baby"	3:25
11.	"Baby It's You"	3:49
12.	"While"	4:18
13.	"Another You"	3:18
14.	"Not Alone"	3:59
Total length:		49:48

== Charts ==
Weekly chart performance for Evolution of a Man
Chart (2009)	Peak position
US Billboard 200	20
US Top R&B/Hip-Hop Albums (Billboard)	3
