= My Favorite Girl =

My Favorite Girl may refer to:

- My Favorite Girl (1950), an animated sing-along film short in the Sing and Be Happy series
- "My Favorite Girl" (New Kids on the Block song), 1990
- "My Favorite Girl" (Dave Hollister song), 1999
