= The Book of David: Vol.1 – The Transition =

Studio album by Dave Hollister
- Released: September 26, 2006
- Studio: GospoCentric; Zomba
- Genre: R&B, gospel
- Length: 65:34
- Label: Warryn Campbell; Mike City; Shep Crawford; Dejion; Dave Hollister; PAJAM; Jesse Wright

Dave Hollister chronology
Real Talk (2003)	The Book of David: Vol.1 – The Transition (2006)	Witness Protection (2008)

The Book of David: Vol.1 – The Transition is the fifth studio album by American singer Dave Hollister. It was released by GospoCentric Records and the Zomba Label Group on September 26, 2006, in the United States.

== Critical reception ==
Professional ratings
Review scores
Source	Rating
AllMusic	3.5/5 stars
USA Today	3/4 stars

AllMusic editor Andy Kellman felt that the album "really isn't that much different from the singer's past releases. Hollister has a newfound focus, and the subject matter often takes on a slightly more pronounced turn for the spiritual, but the tracks bump and sway as much as any other set he has released. Besides, the detectable changes shouldn't shock anyone who has followed him – he came up in the church, and both of his parents were preachers. The album lacks the beneficial brevity of 2003's Real Talk and meanders during the second half. Beyond that, it is just as appealing as anything else in the man's catalog and should not be disregarded by virtue of its label of release." Steve Jones of USA Today gave The Book of David: Vol. 1, The Transition a three-star rating, praising the R&B singer's move toward spiritual themes and his personal journey from secular music to faith-based material.

== Track listing ==
No.	Title	Writer(s)	Producer(s)	Length
1.	"The Preface"	Shep Crawford; Dave Hollister	Crawford; Hollister	1:40
2.	"Nothing But God"	Michael Flowers	Mike City	4:03
3.	"The Intro"	Crawford; Hollister	Crawford; Hollister	0:46
4.	"Help Me"	Eric Dawkins; Warryn Campbell	Campbell	3:59
5.	"So Many Scars"	Jesse Wright	Wright; Hollister	3:47
6.	"Questions"	Wright; Hollister	Wright; Hollister	3:48
7.	"Pray (Til I Get an Answer)"	Paul Allen; Reginald Lewis	PAJAM	4:51
8.	"Drama"	Crawford; Hollister	Crawford; Hollister	1:04
9.	"Divorced"	Wright; Hollister	Wright; Hollister	4:14
10.	"The Settlement"	Dejion Madison; Lamar Mahone	Dejion; Hula^{[A]}	4:21
11.	"My Pain"	Crawford; Hollister	Crawford; Hollister	1:18
12.	"What Do You Do"	Carnell Murrell; Ernest Lee	PAJAM	5:44
13.	"Where R U?"/"Answer Me"	Crawford; Hollister	Crawford; Hollister	1:02
14.	"Reach Out to Me"	Wright; Hollister	Wright; Hollister	4:57
15.	"I Let Heaven Down"	Crawford	Crawford	4:36
16.	"The Morning After"	Crawford; Hollister	Crawford; Hollister	1:26
17.	"The Potter"	Andraé Crouch	Crawford	4:25
18.	"I've Changed"	Wright; Hollister	Wright; Hollister	3:36
19.	"No One"	Flowers	City	4:09
20.	"Take Me Back"	Crawford; Hollister	Crawford; Hollister	1:01
21.	"The Closing"	Crawford; Hollister	Crawford; Hollister	0:47

Notes

- ^{^[A]} denotes co-producer

== Charts ==
Chart (2006)	Peak position
US Billboard 200	98
US Top Gospel Albums (Billboard)	1
US Top R&B/Hip-Hop Albums (Billboard)	13
