= Things in the Game Done Changed =

Studio album by Dave Hollister
- Released: September 17, 2002
- Genre: R&B
- Length: 61:03
- Label: Goodfellas; Motown
- Producer: Big Bert; Big Joe; Chop; Mike City; Bryan Michael Cox; Allen "Allstar" Gordon; Gerald Haddon; Dave Hollister; Davel "Bo" McKenzie; Jamie Portee; Donnie Scantz; Tank

Dave Hollister chronology
Chicago '85... The Movie (2002)	Things in the Game Done Changed (2002)	Real Talk (2003)

Things in the Game Done Changed is the third studio album by American singer Dave Hollister. It was released by Goodfellas Entertainment and Motown Records on September 17, 2002, in the United States.

== Promotion ==
In November 2000, Dave Hollister released his second solo album Chicago '85... The Movie with DreamWorks Records. It produced the R&B top ten hit "One Woman Man" and peaked at number 49 on the US Billboard 200. The album also reached number 10 on the Top R&B/Hip-Hop Albums chart and eventually received a Gold certification from the Recording Industry Association of America (RIAA) for shipments of 500,000 units. Unsatisfied with the label's promotion of the project, Hollister later became "very vocal" about his desire to leave DreamWorks following Chicago '85... The Movie's release and was ultimately granted his request.

For his next solo project, he signed with Motown through Donny "Drano" Harrell's Goodfellas Entertainment. As on his previous projects, Hollister collaborated with Mike City and Tank on material for the album, while Robert "Big Bert" Smith, Bryan Michael Cox, Loren Dawson, Donnie Scantz, and others also contributed. Similar to his earlier work, the album focused largely on themes of love and relationships. However, it featured a greater number of uptempo tracks than his previous releases, while continuing his aim of using music to encourage the building of successful relationships.

== Promotion ==
Motown released "Baby Do Those Things," co-written by Eric Dawkins and produced by Smith, as the album's lead single. The song peaked at number 72 on the US Hot R&B/Hip-Hop Songs chart. A second single, "What's a Man to Do," failed to chart. In further support of Things in the Game Done Changed, Hollister joined Kelly Price, Glenn Lewis, and fellow Motown act Black Coffey on the 10-city Hennessy Privilege Tour that run through November.

== Critical reception ==
Professional ratings
Review scores
Source	Rating
AllMusic	3/5 stars
USA Today	3/4 stars

The album earned mixed reviews from music critics. Gail Mitchell from Billboard found that Things in the Game Done Changed showcased Hollister's "urgent, yet sensual vocal prowess" and that he "definitely knows what works" on emotional tracks, though she felt the 16-track album was "too long" and sometimes drifted into "midtempo/ballad sameness." USA Today critic Steve Jones wrote that Things in the Game Done Changed showed a "mature take" on relationships, with "frank, conversational lyrics" and a "soulful, sinewy voice" that helped him succeed despite temptations and frustrations. He rated the album three stars out of four.

AllMusic editor Dan LeRoy wrote that "despite its title, Things in the Game Done Changed doesn't mark any substantial shift in Hollister's formula: he still favors repetitive tunes rooted in gospel, substituting the ebb and flow of his powerful pipes for catchy hooks and melodies [...] There's still no hit that would give Hollister the recognition his voice deserves, but he's finally made an album as rock-solid as his singing style." LeRoy rated the album three ouf of five stars, Similarly, Mark Anthony Neal, writing for PopMatters, concluded that the album was unlikely to deliver Hollister a commercial breakthrough, emphasizing that he "has never really been about the hits but continuing to uplift the tradition."

== Commercial performance ==
Things in the Game Done Changed became Hollister's first and only top ten album to date, reaching number ten on the US Billboard 200 with first week sales of 71,000 copies. It also reached number three on Billboard's Top R&B/Hip-Hop Albums chart, marking his highest peak on the chart. The album would mark Hollister's only project with Motown. He later acknowledged that hings in the Game Done Changed "had legs, but the ball was dropped," and, regretting his decision to leave DreamWorks, re-signed with the label for his next album, Real Talk (2003).

== Track listing ==
Things in the Game Done Changed track listing
No.	Title	Writer(s)	Producer(s)	Length
1.	"Things in the Game Done Changed"	Durrell Babbs	Tank	1:19
2.	"It's Okay"	Eric Dawkins; Anson Dawkins; Robert Smith	Big Bert	3:43
3.	"What's a Man to Do"	Allen "Allstar" Gordon; Joel Campbell; Johnta Austin	Gordon	4:00
4.	"My Everything"	Dave Hollister; Bryan Michael Cox; Dave Young; Luther Vandross	Cox	4:24
5.	"Baby Do Those Things"	Blake English; Hollister; E. Dawkins; A. Dawkins; Smith	Big Bert	4:13
6.	"For You"	Bryan Sledge; Gerald Haddon	Haddon	4:19
7.	"One Addiction"	Hollister; Joseph Thomas; Loren Dawson	Dawson	3:33
8.	"No Ordinary Love" (Interlude)	Michell Jones; Parkes Stewart	Hollister; Tank	1:36
9.	"Love Hate Relationship"	Babbs	Tank	4:15
10.	"Tell Me Why"	Young; Davel "Bo" McKenzie	McKenzie	5:05
11.	"What Should I Say"	Hollister; Young; McKenzie	McKenzie	4:38
12.	"I'm Wrong"	Donnie Scantz; Babbs; Jamie Portee	Scantz; Tank; Portee	5:01
13.	"Tonite"	Hollister; Michael Flowers	Mike City	3:45
14.	"No One Else"	English; E. Dawkins; A. Dawkins; Smith	Big Bert	3:26
15.	"We Gon' Make It (Mama E's Song)"	Hollister; Young; McKenzie	McKenzie	3:31
16.	"Keep Lovin' You (Remix)" (featuring AZ)	Anthony Cruz; Young; McKenzie; Donald Woolfolk; Joe Sample; Mar Curry	Big Joe; Chop	4:14
Total length:				61:03

Sample credits

- "My Everything" contains a sample from "Promise Me" as performed by Luther Vandross.
- "Keep Lovin' You (Remix)" contains elements of "In All My Wildest Dreams" as performed and written by Joe Sample.

== Charts ==
Chart performance for Things in the Game Done Changed
Chart (2002)	Peak position
US Billboard 200	10
US Top R&B/Hip-Hop Albums (Billboard)	3
