= Just Me (Brian McKnight album) =

Studio album by Brian McKnight
- Released: July 12, 2011
- Genre: R&B
- Length: 114:47 (deluxe)
- Label: E1 Music
- Producer: Brian McKnight

Brian McKnight chronology
Evolution of a Man (2009)	Just Me (2011)	More Than Words (2013)

Just Me is the twelfth studio album by American singer Brian McKnight. It was released by E1 Music on July 12, 2011 in the United States. It includes the singles "Fall 5.0" and "Temptation," the latter of which features McKnight's son Brian McKnight Jr. Additionally, a deluxe edition was released exclusively through Walmart and featured a live CD/DVD set.

== Critical reception ==
Professional ratings
Review scores
Source	Rating
About.com	3.5/5 stars
Boston Globe	3.5/5 stars

Ken Capobianco from The Boston Globe found that "all the tunes are artfully arranged and lean; only one exceeds four minutes. This works to his advantage, especially on "Just Me", a lovely ballad, and on the upbeat “Gimme Yo Love" [...] The best tracks avoid the oh-so-tasteful vibe that has marred some of his studio work." In her review for SoulTracks, editor Melody Charles wrote that "thanks to his longevity and versatility as a performer, Brian McKnight couldn’t be blamed if he decided to fall back a bit; but instead, the melismatic maestro puts that name and reputation on the line in an effort to include the newest McKnight generation, returning – with a pair of his musically-inclined sons in tow – for his eleventh CD, the dubiously-titled Just Me."

== Track listing ==
All tracks are produced by Brian McKnight.

Just Me — Standard edition
No.	Title	Writer(s)	Length
1.	"Temptation" (featuring Brian McKnight Jr.)	Brian McKnight; Brian McKnight Jr.	3:26
2.	"Fall 5.0"	McKnight	3:51
3.	"One Mo Time"	McKnight	3:27
4.	"Gimme Yo Love"	McKnight	3:36
5.	"Husband 2.1"	McKnight	3:50
6.	"Without You"	McKnight	4:04
7.	"Just Lemme Know"	McKnight	3:57
8.	"End And Beginning with You"	McKnight	3:23
9.	"Careless Whisper"	Andrew Ridgeley; George Michael	3:56
10.	"Just Me"	McKnight	3:44

Disc 2: Just Me — The Live Album (bonus disc)
No.	Title	Length
1.	"Find Myself in You"	2:51
2.	"More Than Wonderful"	2:03
3.	"Only One for Me"	3:29
4.	"Bio Part 1"	1:32
5.	"Gonna Fly Now (Rocky Theme)"	0:46
6.	"Sonata (Classical)"	1:13
7.	"Rouge"	0:23
8.	"Bio Part 2"	0:50
9.	"On the Battlefield for My Lord"	0:34
10.	"Bio Part 3 ("Sweet Love")"	0:53
11.	"Find My Way Back Home"	1:41
12.	"Unforgettable"	1:55
13.	"Overjoyed"	2:17
14.	"Rock with You"	2:58
15.	"Crazy Love"	2:59
16.	"Can You Read My Mind"	2:44
17.	"Come Back to Me"	3:18
18.	"Never Felt This Way"	2:20
19.	"All I Need Is You"	3:11
20.	"Still"	1:53
21.	"Do You Ever Think About Me"	2:52
22.	"The Rest of My Life"	2:40
23.	"Temptation"	3:17
24.	"I Miss You"	2:20
25.	"Anytime"	5:41
26.	"Back at One"	4:43
27.	"One Last Cry"	5:25
28.	"One More Time"	3:05
29.	"Cherish"	3:13
30.	"Shoulda, Woulda, Coulda"	4:50

== Charts ==
Chart (2011)	Peak position
US Billboard 200	39
US Top R&B/Hip-Hop Albums (Billboard)	8
