= Used to Be My Girl =

Single by Brian McKnight

from the album Ten
- Released: 2006
- Recorded: 2006
- Genre: R&B
- Length: 4:12
- Label: Warner Bros.
- Songwriters: Tim Kelley; Bob Robinson; Brian McKnight
- Producer: Tim & Bob

Brian McKnight singles chronology
"Find Myself in You" (2006)	"Used to Be My Girl" (2006)	"What's My Name" (2007)

"Used to Be My Girl" is a song by American singer Brian McKnight. It was written by McKnight along with Tim Kelley and Bob Robinson for his ninth studio album Ten (2006), while production was helmed by Kelley and Robinson under their production moniker Tim & Bob. The song peaked at number 25 on the Billboard Hot R&B/Hip-Hop Songs chart. The song was released as the album's lead single on October 17, 2006 and peaked at number 25 on the Billboard Hot R&B/Hip-Hop Songs chart.

== Lyrics ==
The song, as McKnight states in the beginning, "is not another love song". Instead, the song's lyrics expresses dismay at what he perceives to be another man's excessive pride in his relationship with an attractive girlfriend; with whom the songwriter used to have a relationship. McKnight's lyrics seemingly taunt the new love interest, going so far as to offer advice on dealing with the past relationship:

See, I know what you're thinkin'
You're feelin' like a lucky guy
I was the same way
'cause she was hard to come by
I was on her so hard
That I almost lost my hustle
So go 'head, playboy, do your thing
Don't be mad if she calls my name

The antagonist cautions the woman's new boyfriend not to "hate on" him when she intimately mentions his name, and implies that the new relationship is really "just a game", a theory that he argues is proven by her perceived inability to acknowledge his presence as he watches the new couple:

She's still thinkin' 'bout me, And I'll tell you why,
She couldn't even hold her head up when you walked by

The song ends with the singer recounting and implying to the new boyfriend various intimate acts that the woman performed for him when "she was my girl".

== Formats and track listings ==
Digital single
No.	Title	Length
1.	"Used to Be My Girl" (Main Edit)	3:27
2.	"Used to Be My Girl" (Instrumental)	3:04

== Charts ==
=== Weekly charts ===
Chart (2006)	Peak position
US Bubbling Under Hot 100 (Billboard)	14
US Hot R&B/Hip-Hop Songs (Billboard)	25

=== Year-end charts ===
Chart (2007)	Position
US Hot R&B/Hip-Hop Songs (Billboard)	98
