= Ghetto Hymns =

Studio album by Dave Hollister
- Released: May 25, 1999
- Genre: R&B
- Length: 68:05
- Label: DreamWorks
- Producer: Darrell "Dezo" Adams; Teddy Bishop; Wesley Hogges; Dave Hollister; Stevie J; John Mitchell; Gene Peoples; Jazze Pha; Redman; Erick Sermon; Tim & Bob; Eric Williams

Dave Hollister chronology
Ghetto Hymns (1999)	Chicago '85... The Movie (2000)

Singles from Ghetto Hymns
- 1. "My Favorite Girl" Released: March 2, 1999; 2. "Can't Stay" Released: 1999; 3. "Baby Mama Drama" Released: 1999

Professional ratings
Review scores
Source	Rating
AllMusic	4/5 stars

Ghetto Hymns is the solo debut studio album by American contemporary R&B singer Dave Hollister. It was released by DreamWorks Records on May 25, 1999, in the United States. His first effort (after his success with Blackstreet), the album was co-produced by Hollister and Erick Sermon. It peaked at number 34 on the US Billboard 200.

Three singles were released from the album: "My Favorite Girl", "Can't Stay" and "Baby Mama Drama". "My Favorite Girl" is Hollister's only hit to date on the US Billboard Hot 100, peaking at number 39 in 1999. The album was certified gold on March 6, 2000. In addition to original songs, the album contains covers of the Michael McDonald song "I Keep Forgettin' (Every Time You're Near)" and the Twinkie Clark-Terrell song "In Him There is No Sorrow" (listed on the album as "Keep Forgettin'" and "Respect 2 Him", respectively).

== Track listing ==
Credits adapted from the album's liner notes.

No.	Title	Writer(s)	Producer(s)	Length
1.	"Ghetto Hymns (The Introduction)" (featuring Redman)	Johnny "Guitar" Watson	Redman	1:09
2.	"Came in the Door Pimpin' (featuring Too $hort)"	Dave Hollister; Todd Anthony Shaw; Jazze Pha; Kenneth Fambro; Suzanne Vega	Pha; Fambro^{[A]}	4:23
3.	"My Favorite Girl"	Hollister; Marc Kinchen; Steven Jordan; T. "Sonnyboy" Turpin	Stevie J	5:32
4.	"Round and Round"	Teddy Bishop; Johntá Austin; Pha	Pha; Bishop	4:29
5.	"Baby Mama Drama"/"It's Alright" (Bonus hymn)	Eric Williams; Wesley Hogges; Hollister; Eugene Peoples	Williams; Hogges; Gene Peoples; Spanky Williams^{[A]}	8:59
6.	"Cheaterlude" (Interlude)	Hollister	Hollister	1:18
7.	"Can't Stay"	Hollister	Peoples; Hollister^{[A]}	6:17
8.	"Bring It to Dave" (Interlude)	Hollister	Hollister	1:51
9.	"Call on Me"	Hollister; Will Jennings; Joe Sample; Erick Sermon	Sermon	3:43
10.	"Missin' You"	Hollister; Sammy Lowe; Sermon	Sermon; Hollister^{[A]}	4:41
11.	"Keep Forgettin'"	Jerry Leiber; Mike Stoller	Hollister	5:11
12.	"Come Inside My Room" (Interlude)	Hollister; John Mitchell	Mitchell	1:46
13.	"The Program"	Hollister; Sermon	Sermon	4:47
14.	"My Feelin's"	Darrell "Dezo" Adams; Hollister	Adams	6:18
15.	"Respect 2 Him" (Outro)	Twinkie Clark-Terrell	Hollister	3:45
16.	"I'm Sorry" (My Favorite Girl remix)	Tim Kelley; Bob Robinson	Tim & Bob	3:56
Total length:				68:05

Notes

- ^{^[A]} denotes co-producer

Sample credits

- "Came in the Door Pimpin'" contains a sample of "Tom's Diner" by Suzanne Vega.
- "Call on Me" contains a sample of "Soul Shadows" by The Crusaders featuring Bill Withers.

== Charts ==
=== Weekly charts ===
Chart (1999)	Peak position
US Billboard 200	34
US Top R&B/Hip-Hop Albums (Billboard)	5

=== Year-end charts ===
Chart (1999)	Position
US Top R&B/Hip-Hop Albums (Billboard)	75
Chart (2000)	Position
US Top R&B/Hip-Hop Albums (Billboard)	84

== Certifications ==
Region	Certification	Certified units/sales
United States (RIAA)	Gold	500,000^{^}
^{^} Shipments figures based on certification alone.
