= Take Care of Home =

2001 single by Dave Hollister

Single by Dave Hollister

from the album Chicago '85... The Movie
- Released: April 2, 2001
- Recorded: 2000
- Genre: R&B
- Length: 4:16 (album version); 3:58 (single edit)
- Label: DreamWorks
- Songwriters: Tim Kelley; Bob Robinson
- Producers: Tim Kelley; Bob Robinson

Dave Hollister singles chronology
"One Woman Man" (2000)	"Take Care of Home" (2001)	"Baby Do Those Things" (2002)

Music video
- "Take Care of Home" on VH1.com

"Take Care of Home" is a song performed by American contemporary R&B singer Dave Hollister, issued by DreamWorks Records on April 2, 2001 as the second and final single from his second studio album, Chicago '85... The Movie. Produced and written by Tim & Bob, the song peaked at number 39 on the US Hot R&B/Hip-Hop Songs chart.

== Release and chart performance ==
The song peaked at number 39 on the US Hot R&amp;B/Hip-Hop Songs chart in 2001. It was released by DreamWorks Records.

== Production ==
"Take Care of Home" was written and produced by the duo Tim Kelley and Bob Robinson, known as "Tim & Bob,".

== Music video ==
A music video for "Take Care of Home" was released on April 2, 2001, and was available on VH1.com.

== Track list ==
The promotional CD maxi-single for "Take Care of Home" featured several versions of the song:

1. "Take Care of Home" (Radio Version) – 3:58
2. "Take Care of Home" (LP Version) – 4:15
3. "Take Care of Home" (Instrumental) – 4:17
4. "Take Care of Home" (A Cappella) – 4:15
5. "Take Care of Home" (TV Version) – 4:17
6. "Take Care of Home" (Call-out Hook) – 0:29

== Chart position ==
Chart (2001)	Peak position
US Hot R&B/Hip-Hop Songs (Billboard)	39
