= I'll Be Home for Christmas (Brian McKnight album) =

Studio album by Brian McKnight
- Released: October 7, 2008
- Genres: Christmas; R&B
- Length: 49:48
- Label: Razor & Tie
- Producers: Silas White (exec.); Brian McKnight

Brian McKnight chronology
Ten (2006)	I'll Be Home for Christmas (2008)	Evolution of a Man (2009)

I'll Be Home for Christmas is the tenth studio album and second Christmas album by American singer Brian McKnight. It was released on October 7, 2008, through Razor & Tie.

== Critical reception ==
Professional ratings
Review scores
Source	Rating
About.com	4/5 stars
AllMusic	3/5 stars

Mark Edward Nero of About.com awarded I'll Be Home for Christmas four out of five stars, praising it as "one of the best" contemporary Christmas albums. He highlighted its romantic, soulful, and spiritual atmosphere, commending McKnight's vocal performance and concluding that the record was "a solid album that the whole family can enjoy." In his review for AllMusic, editor Anthony Tognazzini wrote that "one good holiday album deserves another, and McKnight’s smooth, alluring voice sounds better than ever on 2008’s ll Be Home for Christmas. The tunes are a bit more secular than Bethlehem."

== Track listing ==
No.	Title	Length
1.	"The Christmas Song"	4:37
2.	"Silver Bells"	3:42
3.	"Let It Snow" (featuring Brian McKnight Jr. & Nikolas McKnight)	2:44
4.	"Christmas You and Me" (featuring Vince Gill)	4:07
5.	"I'll Be Home for Christmas"	3:15
6.	"Silent Night" (featuring Noel Schajris)	3:27
7.	"It's the Most Wonderful Time of the Year"	2:19
8.	"Adeste Fideles"	2:45
9.	"Who Would Have Thought"	4:39
10.	"Angels We Have Heard on High" (featuring Josh Groban)	3:30
11.	"Christmas Medley" ("What Child Is This?"/"Away in a Manger"/"The First Noel")	3:49
12.	"Bless This House" (featuring Take 6)	4:18

== Charts ==
Chart (2008)	Peak position
US Top R&B/Hip-Hop Albums (Billboard)	22
