= Ten (Brian McKnight album) =

Studio album by Brian McKnight
- Released: December 5, 2006
- Genre: R&B, soul
- Length: 64:37
- Label: Warner Bros.
- Producer: Silas White (exec.); Bryan-Michael Cox; Brian McKnight; Tim & Bob; WyldCard

Brian McKnight chronology
| Gemini (2005) | Ten (2006) | I'll Be Home for Christmas (2008) |

Singles from Ten
- 1. "Find Myself in You" Released: April 2006; 2. "Used to Be My Girl" Released: August 2006; 3. "What's My Name" Released: February 2007

Ten is the ninth studio album by American singer Brian McKnight. It was released on December 5, 2006, on Warner Bros. Records, his first and only album for the label after his departure from Motown following the release of his previous album Gemini (2005). The album features a guest appearance from Rascal Flatts. Knight who wrote and produced most of the material on Ten himself, also worked with singer Jill Scott as well as production duo Tim & Bob, Bryan-Michael Cox, and Kendrick "WyldCard" Dean on the album.

The album received polarized reviews from music critics, some of whom found it superior to previous releases, while others criticized its production and called it generic. Ten debuted at number 32 on the US Billboard 200, selling about 63,000 copies in its first week. Lead single "Find Myself In You" first appeared on the soundtrack to the 2006 film Madea's Family Reunion and became McKnight's sixth number-one hit on the US Adult R&B Songs chart. It was followed by "Used to Be My Girl" and "What's My Name."

== Background ==
In 2006, McKnight severed ties with the Motown label after the release of Gemini (2005), his fifth project with the record company. Granted a new creative release after signing a new record deal Warner Bros. Records, he felt able to write material with a new-found "maturity and depth of honesty" for his next album, his tenth project (including 2002's compilation album From There to Here: 1989-2002), which he later described as "full of theme songs," inspired by his post-divorce life. As with on previous albums, McKnight wrote and produced most of the material on Ten himself. Additional collaborators include production duo Tim & Bob as well as Bryan-Michael Cox and his protegé WyldCard. American country music band Rascal Flatts appears on the song "Red, White, Blue." "More Than Just a Thang," a duet with Jill Scott, failed to make the final track listing.

== Critical reception ==
Professional ratings
Review scores
| Source | Rating |
|---|---|
| About.com | 4/5 stars |
| AllMusic | 3.5/5 stars |
| Entertainment Weekly | 6/10 stars |
| USA Today | 3/4 stars |

Mark Edward Nero from About.com found that McKnight's decision to leave Motown Records "has proven to be a good one for McKnight who sounds completely rejuvenated on his tenth album, appropriately titled Ten. Not only is Ten an all-around better album than his last Motown release, 2005's Gemini, it arguably ranks among his best three or four albums ever." In his review for AllMusic, Andy Kellman remarked that "just about the smartest thing Brian McKnight could do in 2006 is collaborate with Tim & Bob, a veteran do-it-all studio duo who have quietly contributed to many of the best and/or most successful R&B tracks [...] With 2005's Gemini and this release – two of his finest albums – McKnight is on something of a roll." Billboard magazine wrote: "Now an elder statesman in the R&B and pop arenas, McKnight offers another mood-setting mix of midtempo cuts and ballads."

Steve Jones of USA Today gave Ten a three-star rating, praising the album's blend of smooth R&B ballads and a more assertive approach to romance. He highlighted McKnight's willingness to explore vulnerability and confidence while noting the album's stylistic departure with "Red, White, and Blue." Margeaux Watson from Entertainment Weekly gave the album a C+ rating and felt that "McKnight's slick sound is favored by the urban adult-contemporary set, and it’s unlikely he’ll win any new (read: young) fans with his 10th album. Mostly produced by the singer-songwriter himself, Ten is a merrily generic batch of R&B grooves and slow jams." SoulTracks's Detrel Howell wrote that "Ten will more than likely shine for Brian McKnight's diehard fans who support his music without fail; for me, it wasn't chock full of all that I'd hoped for after hearing "Find Myself in You," but it won't be banished to the archives just yet." Ben Ratliff, writing for The New York Times, found that on Ten McKnight was "working within a tradition, and one worth upholding, but not at the cost of [...] abject cliché. A lot of the record operates on autopilot."

== Commercial performance ==
Ten debuted and peaked at number 32 on the US Billboard 200 in the week of December 23, 2006, selling 63,000 copies in its first week of release. It marked McKnights's lowest-charting album since 1992's Brian McKnight and was a considerable decline from his previous four efforts, all of which had reached the top ten of the Billboard 200. The album also debuted at number four on Billboard's Top R&B/Hip-Hop Albums chart, becoming his fifth consecutive album to reach the top five.

== Track listing ==
Ten track listing
| No. | Title | Writer(s) | Producer(s) | Length |
|---|---|---|---|---|
| 1. | "Used to Be My Girl" | Tim Kelley; McKnight; Bob Robinson | Tim & Bob | 4:12 |
| 2. | "Comfortable" | McKnight; Bryan-Michael Cox; Kendrick Dean | Cox; WyldCard | 3:36 |
| 3. | "Find Myself in You" | McKnight | McKnight | 4:13 |
| 4. | "What's My Name" | McKnight | McKnight | 4:50 |
| 5. | "Unhappy Without You" | Kelley; Robinson; McKnight | Tim & Bob | 4:07 |
| 6. | "A Little Too Late" | McKnight | McKnight | 4:53 |
| 7. | "Holdin' On (Missin' You)" | McKnight | McKnight | 4:39 |
| 8. | "Shoulda Been Lovin' You" | McKnight | McKnight | 5:04 |
| 9. | "Again" | Kelley; McKnight; Robinson | McKnight; Tim & Bob | 4:37 |
| 10. | "More and More" | McKnight | McKnight | 3:24 |
| 11. | "Can't Leave You Alone" | Kelley; McKnight; Robinson | McKnight; Tim & Bob | 4:08 |
| 12. | "I Do" | McKnight | McKnight | 4:00 |
| 13. | "Rest of My Life" | McKnight | McKnight | 4:42 |
| 14. | "Red, White, Blue" (with Rascal Flatts) | McKnight | McKnight | 4:47 |
| 15. | "Don't Take Your Love Away" | McKnight | McKnight | 4:02 |
| Total length: | | | | 64:37 |

Japanese edition – bonus track
| No. | Title | Writer(s) | Producer(s) | Length |
|---|---|---|---|---|
| 16. | "How" | McKnight | McKnight | 4:06 |

== Charts ==
=== Weekly charts ===
Weekly chart performance for Ten
| Chart (2006) | Peak position |
|---|---|
| US Billboard 200 | 32 |
| US Top R&B/Hip-Hop Albums (Billboard) | 4 |

=== Year-end charts ===
Year-end chart performance for Ten
| Chart (2007) | Position |
|---|---|
| US Top R&B/Hip-Hop Albums (Billboard) | 48 |
