= Chicago Winds... The Saga Continues =

Studio album by Dave Hollister
- Released: October 21, 2014
- Genre: R&B
- Length: 40:41
- Label: E1 Music
- Producer: Eric Dawkins; Warryn Campbell

Dave Hollister chronology
United Tenors (2013)	Chicago Winds... The Saga Continues (2014)	The Manuscript (2016)

Chicago Winds... The Saga Continues is a studio album by American singer Dave Hollister. It was released by eOne Music on October 21, 2014 in the United States.

== Critical reception ==
Professional ratings
Review scores
Source	Rating
AllMusic	3.5/5 stars

Allmusic editor Andy Kellman found that Chicago Winds... The Saga Continues is "a solid and consistent release that shows Hollister in top form, singing about relatable, common-man issues with the same level of conviction heard in his best work. No less than half of the songs can contend with the career highlights selected for his 20th Century Masters compilation, and though some longtime fans may miss the streetwise swagger of the earlier work, they can at least respect that Hollister has matured, remains an excellent singer, and isn't trying to be anyone but himself."

== Track listing ==
No.	Title	Writer(s)	Length
1.	"Spend the Night"	Eric Dawkins; Warryn Campbell	3:48
2.	"I'm Different"	Dawkins; Campbell	3:44
3.	"I'm Waiting"	Dawkins; Campbell	3:13
4.	"Cold"	Dawkins; Campbell; Juan Winans; Tristen Wilds	3:30
5.	"Wish You Well"	Dawkins; Campbell; Dana Caddell	3:47
6.	"Chicago Winds"	Gromyko Collins; Unique Banks; Campbell	4:51
7.	"Afraid to Lose"	Dawkins; Campbell	4:33
8.	"Done"	Dawkins; Campbell; Charlene Jenkins	3:10
9.	"Take This Picture"	Dawkins; Campbell	3:23
10.	"Neverland"	Winans; Campbell	2:45
11.	"Spend the Night" (Teddy Riley Remix)	Dawkins; Campbell	3:56

== Charts ==
Chart (2014)	Peak position
US Billboard 200	110
US Independent Albums (Billboard)	19
US Top R&B/Hip-Hop Albums (Billboard)	21
