= The Manuscript (album) =

Studio album by Dave Hollister
- Released: September 9, 2016
- Studio: Shanachie
- Genre: R&B, soul
- Length: 34:52

Dave Hollister chronology
Chicago Winds... The Saga Continues (2014)	The Manuscript (2016)

The Manuscript (often stylized The MANuscript) is a studio album by American singer Dave Hollister. It was released by Shanachie Records in collaboration with Conjunction Entertainment and TopNotch Music on September 9, 2016.

== Critical reception ==
Professional ratings
Review scores
Source	Rating
AllMusic	4/5 stars

Allmusic editor Andy Kellman wrote that "as with his best work, Hollister carries himself with easy-going, modest certitude [...] Hollister is ideally matched with his supporting collaborators, with whom he made what he calls "a guide for men," though it does not come across as some grandly designed concept album. It's a simple, straightforward set that largely adheres to polished, soul-rooted R&B, with Hollister doling out advice and relating tales, inspired as ever by the likes of Sam Cooke and Bobby Womack, without pulpiting."

== Track listing ==
No.	Title	Writer(s)	Producer(s)	Length
1.	"Definition of a Woman"	Anthony Smith; Balewa Muhammad; Bill Jabr; Candice Nelson; Charles Amos; Perry Mapp; Walter Millsap III	Muhammad; Nelson; Millsap; Smith; Jabr	3:18
2.	"Receipts" (featuring Angie Stone)	Muhammad; Nelson; Dave Hollister; Mapp; Teak Underdue; Tenille Johnson; Millsap	Muhammad; Nelson; Millsap; Underdue	3:16
3.	"Creation (H.E.R.)"	Muhammad; Nelson; Mapp; Xavier T. Gordon; Millsap	Muhammad; Nelson; Millsap; Gordon	4:02
4.	"Ooh Ya Ya"	Muhammad; Nelson; Mapp; Underdue; Millsap	Muhammad; Nelson; Millsap; Underdue	3:20
5.	"Shortage"	Muhammad; Nelson; Mapp; Monte Neuble; Tim Stewart; Millsap	Muhammad; Nelson; Millsap; Gordon; Neuble; Stewart	3:36
6.	"Blind"	Muhammad; Nelson; Mapp; Neuble; Stewart; Millsap	Muhammad; Nelson; Millsap; Gordon; Neuble; Stewart	3:43
7.	"One Great Love"	Muhammad; Nelson; Mapp; Underdue; Millsap	Muhammad; Nelson; Millsap; Underdue	4:00
8.	"Barbershop"	Muhammad; Nelson; Mapp; Underdue; Millsap	Muhammad; Nelson; Millsap; Underdue	3:17
9.	"Let Him"	Muhammad; Nelson; Mapp; Ricky Rutland; Amos; Millsap	Muhammad; Nelson; Millsap; Amos	3:22
10.	"Geometry"	Muhammad; Nelson; Mapp; Underdue; Johnson; Millsap	Muhammad; Nelson; Millsap; Underdue	2:58

== Charts ==
Chart (2016)	Peak position
US Independent Albums (Billboard)	48
US Top R&B/Hip-Hop Albums (Billboard)	29
