= My Favorite Girl (Dave Hollister song) =

Single by Dave Hollister

from the album Ghetto Hymns
- Released: March 2, 1999
- Recorded: 1998
- Genre: R&B
- Label: DreamWorks
- Songwriters: Dave Hollister; Marc Kinchen; Steven Jordan
- Producers: Erick Sermon; Bernard Alexander

Dave Hollister singles chronology
"The Weekend" (1998)	"My Favorite Girl" (1999)	"Can't Stay" (1999)

"My Favorite Girl" is a song co-written and performed by American contemporary R&B singer Dave Hollister, issued as the lead single from his debut studio album Ghetto Hymns. The song peaked at number 39 on the Billboard Hot 100 in 1999. The song was released in support of Ghetto Hymns, Hollister's debut studio album.

== Music video ==
The official music video for the song was directed by Steve Carr.

== Charts ==
=== Weekly charts ===
Chart (1999)	Peak position
US Billboard Hot 100	39
US Hot R&B/Hip-Hop Songs (Billboard)	10

=== Year-end charts ===
Chart (1999)	Position
US Hot R&B/Hip-Hop Songs (Billboard)	56
