= Witness Protection (album) =

Studio album by Dave Hollister
- Released: August 5, 2008
- Genre: Gospel, R&B
- Length: 74:20
- Label: GospoCentric; Zomba
- Producer: Jevon Hill

Dave Hollister chronology
| The Book of David: Vol.1 – The Transition (2006) | Witness Protection (2008) | United Tenors (2013) |

Witness Protection is the sixth studio album by American singer Dave Hollister. It released by GospoCentric Records and the Zomba Label Group on August 5, 2008 in the United States.

== Critical reception ==
Professional ratings
Review scores
| Source | Rating |
|---|---|
| AllMusic | 4/5 stars |

Allmusic editor Andree Farias wrote that on Witness Protection "Hollister doesn't skimp on slickness because he's found God; on the contrary, the album offers some of the most true to form R&B confections gospel has seen in 2008. Hollister keeps things unabashedly grown and sexy here: his loverman tendencies haven't gone anywhere, with a mature vibe that recalls former colleagues Ginuwine, Avant, and Jaheim."

== Track listing ==
| No. | Title | Producer(s) | Length |
|---|---|---|---|
| 1. | "I'm Here" | Daheatmizer | 3:34 |
| 2. | "Glow" | Jevon Hill | 4:02 |
| 3. | "More of You" | Hill | 4:28 |
| 4. | "Standing" | Hill | 5:07 |
| 5. | "Striving" | Hill | 4:34 |
| 6. | "I Know I Can" | Hill | 6:03 |
| 7. | "Church" | Daheatmizer | 4:34 |
| 8. | "The Greatest" | Hill | 4:03 |
| 9. | "Don't Stop" | Hill | 4:49 |
| 10. | "Calm da Seas" | Daheatmizer | 4:18 |
| 11. | "Look Up" | Jesse Wright; Dave Hollister | 4:47 |
| 12. | "Secret Place" | Hill | 3:50 |
| 13. | "Bless Me" | Hill | 4:03 |
| 14. | "You Are" | Hill | 4:30 |
| 15. | "Just Worship" | Hill | 5:38 |
| 16. | "Champion" (featuring Jevon Hill) | Hill | 6:00 |

== Charts ==
| Chart (2008) | Peak position |
|---|---|
| US Billboard 200 | 88 |
| US Top Gospel Albums (Billboard) | 2 |
| US Top R&B/Hip-Hop Albums (Billboard) | 9 |
