= Tim & Bob =

American record producer and songwriter duo

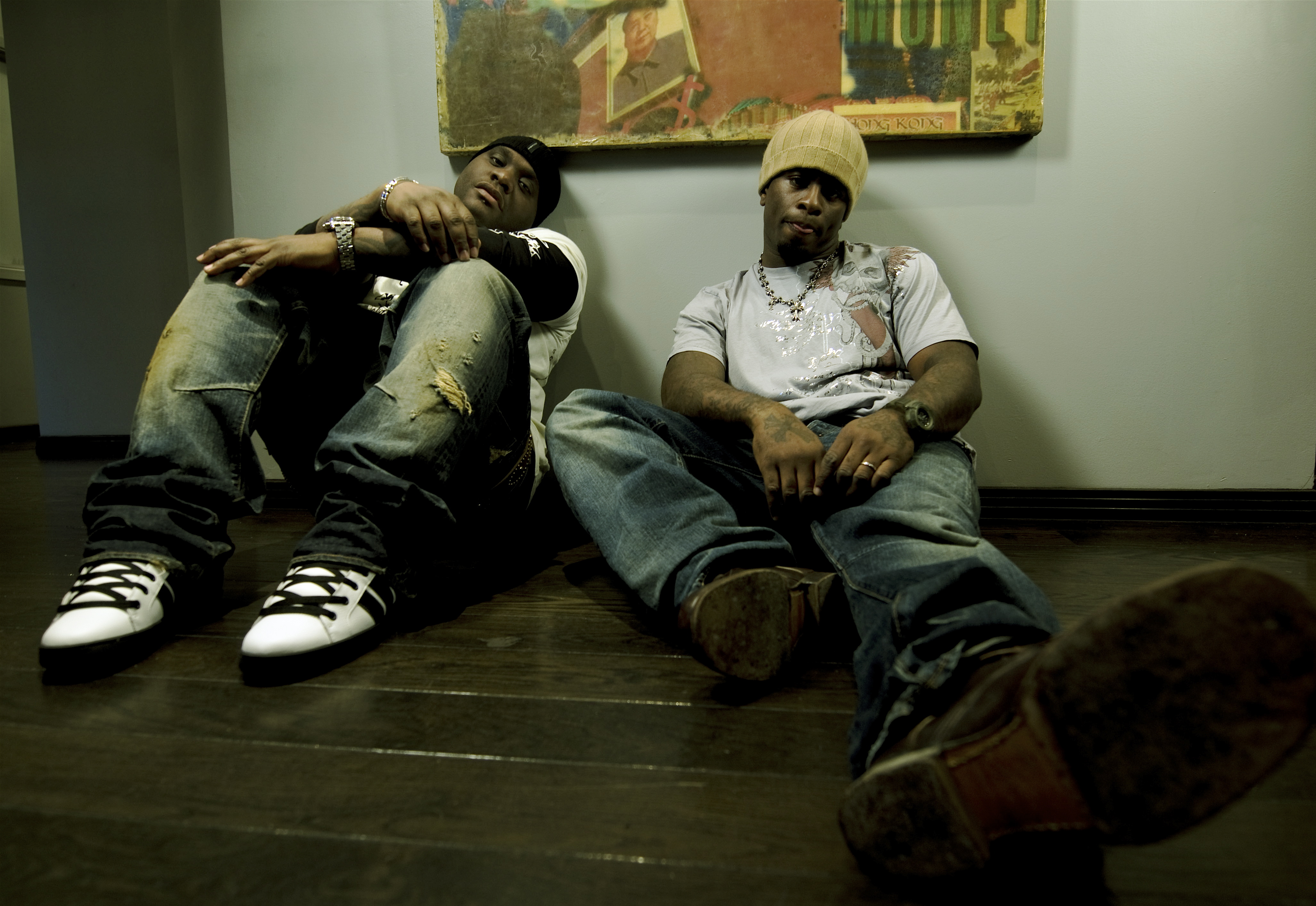
- Tim Kelley (left), Bob Robinson (right)

Background information
- Also known as: Tim Kelley & Bob Robinson, Funktwons
- Origin: Peoria, Illinois, U.S.
- Genres: Hip-hop; R&B; pop
- Occupations: Record producers, songwriters
- Instruments: Piano, keyboards, acoustic guitar, drums (Tim Kelley); Acoustic guitar, electric guitar, keyboards, Hammond B3 (Bob Robinson)
- Years active: 1993–2014 (as a duo); 2014–present (as solo artists)
- Labels: DreamWorks; Def Jam; BMG; SoNo
- Members: Tim Kelley; Bob Robinson

Tim & Bob (Tim Kelley and Bob Robinson), also known as Funktwons, were an American songwriting and production duo from Peoria, Illinois. The duo has been credited on the Billboard Hot 100 top ten-singles "Thong Song" by Sisqó, "Slow Down" by Bobby V and "They Don't Know" by Jon B., as well as the top 40-singles "So Into You" by Tamia and "Come See Me" by 112. They discovered the latter act in Atlanta during the late 1990s, and have since worked extensively with acts such as Bobby V, Boyz II Men, Donell Jones and Monica to produce one or more of their albums, respectively. They disbanded in 2014 to separately pursue solo work.

Tim & Bob have won three Grammy Awards from 12 nominations.

== Biography ==
Growing up in Peoria, Illinois, Tim was raised on R&B through his father's band. His father was a trumpet player and multi-instrumentalist; as such, Tim learned trumpet, piano, guitar, drums and bass at the age of 10. From elementary school through college, Tim played the trumpet and piano in his school band.

Bob played in his church as an organist and piano player from the age of nine; a such, he brought an understanding of gospel music to the duo. Tim met Bob through a mutual friend at the local mall. The two worked together at Tim's house in the basement, recording music on equipment purchased by Tim's mother. They moved to New Orleans for a year, then went to Chicago and Detroit, where they established a small production company with a studio.

== D.A.R.P. Inc. and other label ventures ==
=== 1993–1996 ===
In Atlanta, Tim & Bob through Paul Hill, a veteran of Parliament Funkadelic they were introduced to Dallas Austin, who signed them to his company D.A.R.P. and stamped them as "Tim & Bob". The duo began working with artists TLC, Boyz II Men, Madonna, 112 (whom they discovered) and Monica (who they developed). Tim & Bob brought from Detroit their friends Tony Rich and Mario Winans. Tim & Bob won two Grammy Awards, including one in 1995 for Best R&B Album for Boyz II Men's II and one in 1996 for Best R&B Album for TLC's Diamond certified CrazySexyCool. Tim & Bob produced and wrote five songs on the Boyz II Men LP II, which eventually became the biggest selling album in history by an R&B group. Upon winning consecutive Best R&B Album Grammy awards, the duo worked on songs for the films Def Jam's How to Be a Player, The Players Club, Poetic Justice, Wild Wild West, and Nutty Professor II: The Klumps.

Tim & Bob were frequently brought in by producers Jimmy Jam and Terry Lewis to work on some of their projects.

== Def Jam DreamWorks and Capitol Records ==
=== 1997–1999 ===
Tim & Bob relocated to Los Angeles and signed a publishing deal and a label deal through executive and rock guitarist Robbie Robertson with the now defunct DreamWorks Records, soon scoring a Number 1 hit with Jon B. ("They Don't Know"), and a top-5 hit for Tamia ("So into You"). Tim & Bob were also instrumental in getting the rock group Papa Roach signed to DreamWorks while inking a production deal with Capitol Records. The duo signed Athena Cage from the group Kut Klose and produced a full album of songs, but the project only produced a single for the movie Save The Last Dance.

==== Thong Song ====
In 1999, Tim & Bob produced Sisqó's hit "Thong Song". The single was awarded Song of the Year Hip Hop/Rhythmic at the 2000 Radio Music Awards. It peaked at Number 1 on the New Zealand charts, Number 1 on the Billboard Hot R&B/Hip-Hop Singles & Tracks, Number 1 Billboard on Rhythmic top 40 and Rhythmic top 40 Airplay and Number 3 on the Billboard Hot 100 respectively.

Tim, Babyface, Bob

=== 2000–2003 ===
In 2001, Tim & Bob produced Case's "Missing You", which was his only number one song, and Dave Hollister's "Take Care of Home".

In 2003, Tim & Bob worked with the Isley Brothers album project Body Kiss, and with Earth, Wind And Fire on the song "Hold Me", which was nominated for a Grammy for Best Traditional Vocal by an r&b group. Both projects were nominated for Grammy Awards.

=== 2004–present ===
Tim & Bob discovered Bobby Valentino and produced his self-titled album which spawned the hit songs "Tell Me" and "Slow Down" in early 2005. The latter song was Number 1 for four consecutive weeks on the Billboard Hot R&B/Hip-Hop Songs. In 2006, Tim & Bob signed a publishing deal with Dimensional Music Publishing and began working on Bobby Valentino's second album Special Occasion, on which they produced six tracks.

Subsequent projects include Jennifer Lopez' Platinum certified album Rebirth ("Cherry Pie" and "I, Love"); Brian McKnight's Ten ("Used to Be My Girl", "Unhappy Without You", "Again", "Can't Leave You Alone"); Donell Jones' Journey of a Gemini ("I'm Gonna Be", "Feelin' You", "Can't Wait", "I'm Gonna Be"); Hilary Duff's Dignity ("I Wish"); Nas, Joe, Musiq Soulchild, Ron Isley, Brandy, Tyrese, Amerie, Mýa, Usher, LeToya, Slim of 112, Busta Rhymes, Jamie Foxx ("Life Is Good"); The Black Eyed Peas, Bobby Valentino's The Rebirth ("Make You the Only One", "3 Is the New 2", "On The Edge", "You're Not Alone", "Give Me Your Heart", and "Your Smile"); Day 26's Forever in a Day ("Think of Me" and "Reminds Me of You"); and their artists Mahagani and Chico. In 2011, Tim & Bob produced half of Bobby V's project Fly on the Wall and reunited with Boyz II Men to produce four tracks including a remake of "Motown Philly" on their album Twenty.

=== Key to the city of Peoria, Illinois ===
The city of Peoria, Illinois declared November 18, 2011, as "Tim & Bob Day" and gave the producers a ceremonial key to the city.

=== Lottery ticket ===
Tim & Bob scored the 2010 film Lottery Ticket.

== Breakup ==
Tim & Bob quietly split in 2014. According to Tim Kelley, the decision was mutual, as it was over creative differences in the duo's sound. Kelley said: "Bob is like my brother, I love him man. I think creatively, everything changed. Times have changed now that everybody has access to all of the technology. He started doing stuff that just wasn't sounding like the Tim & Bob sound. I was doing all of the drum patterns and sampling. I'll give you an example, 'Slow Down' by Bobby V is constructed of chopped up samples I put a beat over with Bob playing guitar, which created a style I came up with called 'Asian R&B'. Skip up years later, Bob started doing production on his own without me present which I urged him to, but the sound was more smooth Jazz where as together we were known to be aggressive with the sound, creative drum samples and minimal chord progressions on uptempos. Me and Bob had a conversation and we decided creatively, he wanted to try it on his own."

After their split, Kelley became President of Urban Music and Head of A&R for record label, SoNo Recording Group, where he signed and produced albums for acts including Brian McKnight, Take 6, Shawn Stockman, Raheem DeVaughn and his long-time collaborator Bobby V.

In 2017, Bob Robinson produced "My Man" for Tamar Braxton. "My Man" debuted at number 29 on the Adult R&B Songs Billboard chart for the week of May 13, 2017, and peaked at number three in August. It remained on the chart for 22 weeks. The track also reached number 21 on the Hot R&B Songs Billboard chart for the week of August 26, 2017. Meanwhile, in 2017, Kelley had credits on Brian McKnight's "When I'm Gone" and Raheem DeVaughn's "Just Right."

== Awards and nominations ==
Tim and Bob awards and nominations
Awards and nominations
| Award | Wins | Nominations |
| American Music Awards | 2 | 4 |
| Billboard R&B/Hip-Hop Awards | 5 | 0 |
| Blockbuster Ent Awards | 2 | 0 |
| BMI Awards | 14 | 0 |
| Dove Awards | 0 | 1 |
| Grammy Awards | 3 | 13 |
| Juno Awards | 2 | 0 |
| MTV Video Music Awards | 1 | 3 |
| MOBO Awards | 0 | 3 |
| NAACP Image Awards | 0 | 2 |
| Radio Music Awards | 1 | 0 |
| Lady of Soul Awards | 2 | 0 |
| Soul Train Awards | 3 | 6 |

Totals (Note: Certain award groups do not simply award one winner. They acknowledge several different recipients, have runners-up, and have third place. Since this is a specific recognition and is different from losing an award, runner-up mentions are considered wins in this award tally. For simplification and to avoid errors, each award in this list has been presumed to have had a prior nomination.)
- Wins: 36
- Nominations: 33

=== American Music Awards ===
The American Music Awards is an annual awards ceremony created by Dick Clark in 1973.

| Year | Nominee / work | Award | Result |
|---|---|---|---|
| 1996 | Boyz ll Men | Favorite Soul/R&B Album | Won |
| 1996 | Boyz ll Men | Favorite Pop/Rock Album | Nominated |
| 1996 | TLC | Favorite Soul/R&B Album | Nominated |
| 2001 | Sisqo | Favorite Soul/R&B Album | Nominated |
| 2015 | Chris Brown | Favorite Soul/R&B Album | Nominated |
| 2015 | Pitch Perfect 2 | Favorite Soundtrack | Won |

=== Billboard R&B/Hip-Hop Awards ===
The Billboard R&B/Hip-Hop Awards are sponsored by Billboard magazine and is held annually in December.

| Year | Nominee / work | Award | Result |
|---|---|---|---|
| 1998 | Jon B. | Hot R&B Single of the Year | Won |
| 1998 | Jon B. | Hot R&B Single Sales | Won |
| 2000 | Sisqo | R&B/Hip Hop Single of the Year | Won |
| 2001 | Case | R&B/Hip Hop Single of the Year | Won |
| 2005 | Bobby V | R&B/Hip Hop Single of the Year | Won |

=== Blockbuster Entertainment Awards ===
| Year | Nominee / work | Award | Result |
|---|---|---|---|
| 1995 | Boyz ll Men "II" | Favorite CD | Won |
| 1995 | Boyz ll Men "II" | Favorite R&B CD | Won |
| 2001 | Joe "My Name Is Joe" | Favorite Male Artist R&B CD | Won |

=== Broadcast Music Inc. Awards ===
Broadcast Music, Inc. (BMI) is one of three United States performing rights organizations that holds a series of annual awards shows.

| Year | Nominee / work | Award | Result |
|---|---|---|---|
| 1993 | Get It Up | TLC | Won |
| 1994 | Vibin | Boyz ll Men | Won |
| 1996 | Come See Me | 112 | Won |
| 1996 | Just Be Good To Me | Deborah Cox | Won |
| 1998 | They Don't Know | Jon B. | Won |
| 1998 | So into You | Tamia | Won |
| 2000 | Thong Song | Sisqo | Won |
| 2001 | Take Care of Home | Dave Hollister | Won |
| 2002 | Missing You | Case | Won |
| 2003 | Into You | Fabolous | Won |
| 2005 | Slow Down | Bobby V | Won |
| 2005 | Tell Me | Bobby V | Won |
| 2006 | Used To Be My Girl | Brian McKnight | Won |
| 2007 | I'm Gonna Be | Donell Jones | Won |

=== Dove Awards ===
| Year | Nominee / work | Award | Result |
|---|---|---|---|
| 2007 | Revealed | Deitrick Haddon | Nominated |

=== Grammy Awards ===
The Grammy Awards are awarded annually by the National Academy of Recording Arts and Sciences of the United States.

| Year | Nominee / work | Award | Result |
|---|---|---|---|
| 1994 | II | Best R&B Album | Won |
| 1995 | "CrazySexyCool" | Best R&B Album | Won |
| 1998 | "Tamia" | Best R&B Album | Nominated |
| 2000 | "My Name is Joe" | Best R&B Album | Nominated |
| 2001 | "Thong Song" | Best R&B Song | Nominated |
| 2001 | "Thong Song" | Best Male R&B Vocal Performance | Nominated |
| 2001 | "Unleash The Dragon" | Best R&B Album | Nominated |
| 2002 | "Missing You" | Best Male R&B Vocal Performance | Nominated |
| 2003 | "Body Kiss" | Best R&B Album | Nominated |
| 2003 | "Hold Me" | Best Traditional R&B Vocal Performance | Nominated |
| 2014 | "Three Kings" | Best R&B Album | Nominated |
| 2015 | "X" | Best Urban Contemporary Album | Nominated |
| 2017 | "This Is Acting" | Best Pop Vocal Album | Nominated |

=== Juno Awards ===
The Juno Awards is a Canadian awards ceremony presented annually by the Canadian Academy of Recording Arts and Sciences.

| Year | Nominee / work | Award | Result |
|---|---|---|---|
| 1996 | Deborah Cox | Best R&B/Soul Recording | Won |
| 1999 | Tamia | Best R&B/Soul Recording | Won |

=== MTV Video Music Awards ===
The MTV Video Music Awards is an annual awards ceremony established in 1984 by MTV.

| Year | Nominee / work | Award | Result |
|---|---|---|---|
| 2000 | Thong Song | Best Hip Hop Video | Won |
| 2000 | Thong Song | Best Dance Video | Nominated |
| 2000 | Thong Song | Best Viewer's Choice | Nominated |
| 2000 | Thong Song (Remix Feat. Foxy Brown) | Best Video From A Film | Nominated |

=== Music of Black Origin Awards ===
The Music of Black Origin (MOBO) Awards, established in 1995 by Kanya King MBE and Andy Ruffell, are held annually in the UK to recognise artists of any race or nationality performing black music.

| Year | Nominee / work | Award | Result |
|---|---|---|---|
| 1998 | They Don't Know | Jon B. | Nominated |
| 1998 | They Don't Know | R&B Single Sales | Nominated |
| 2000 | Thong Song | Best Video | Nominated |

=== NAACP Image Awards ===
The NAACP Image Awards is an award presented annually by the American National Association for the Advancement of Colored People to honor outstanding people of color in film, television, music, and literature.

| Year | Nominee / work | Award | Result |
|---|---|---|---|
| 2001 | Joe/ My Name Is Joe | Outstanding Music Album | Nominated |
| 2002 | Tyrese/ 2000 Watts | Outstanding Hip Hop Artist | Nominated |

=== Radio Music Awards ===
The Radio Music Awards was an annual U.S. award show that honors the year's most successful songs on mainstream radio.

| Year | Nominee / work | Award | Result |
|---|---|---|---|
| 2000 | Thong Song | Hip Hop/ Rhythmic Song of the Year | Won |

=== Soul Train Lady of Soul Awards ===
The Soul Train Lady of Soul Awards, first airing in 1995, celebrated top achievements by female performers.

| Year | Nominee / work | Award | Result |
|---|---|---|---|
| 1996 | CrazySexyCool | Best R&B/Soul Album of The Year | Won |
| 1998 | Destiny's Child | Best R&B/Soul Album of The Year | Won |

=== Soul Train Music Awards ===
The Soul Train Music Awards is an annual award show which previously aired in national television syndication that honors the best in Black music and entertainment.

| Year | Nominee / work | Award | Result |
|---|---|---|---|
| 1995 | ll | Best R&B/Soul Album | Won |
| 1997 | CrazySexyCool | Best R&B/Soul Album | Won |
| 1998 | They Don't Know | Best Male Single | Nominated |
| 2000 | J.E. Heartbreak | Best R&B Album Group, Band or Duo | Won |
| 2001 | Part lll | Best R&B/Soul Album | Nominated |
| 2001 | Unleash The Dragon | Favorite Male R&B/Soul Album | Nominated |
| 2003 | Body Kiss | Best R&B Album | Nominated |
| 2003 | Body Kiss | Best R&B/Soul Album – Group, Band or Duo | Nominated |
| 2006 | Slow Down | Best R&B Soul Single | Nominated |
| 2015 | Black Rose | Album Of The Year | Nominated |
| 2015 | X | Album Of The Year | Nominated |

== Equipment Used ==
- NeKo LX (Gen3)
- Akai Pro MPC Series / MPC X
