= Dave Hollister =

American singer

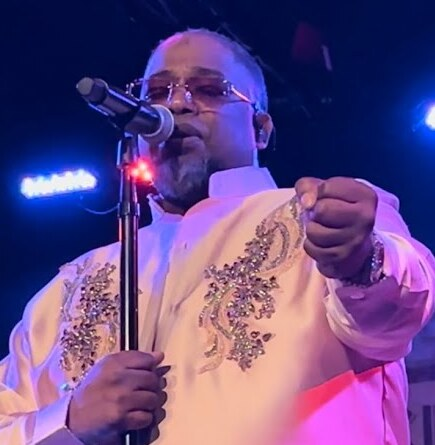
- Dave Hollister performing at City Winery, 2024

Background information
- Also known as: Holli; The Black Angel; The Ghetto Preacher
- Born: David Le Chaine Hollister; August 17, 1968 (age 58); Chicago, Illinois, U.S.
- Genres: R&B; gospel; soul
- Occupations: Singer; songwriter; record producer
- Years active: 1991–present
- Labels: E1; GospoCentric; Zomba; DreamWorks; Motown
- Website: davehollisterlive.com

David Le Chaine Hollister (born August 17, 1968) is an American singer from Chicago, Illinois who found fame in 1994 as one quarter of the R&B group Blackstreet, before going on to have a solo career. Hollister is best known for his 2000 gold-certified album Chicago '85... The Movie, which included the singles "One Woman Man" and "Take Care of Home". He was also featured on 2Pac's hit singles "Brenda's Got a Baby" and "Keep Ya Head Up". He was a member of the band United Tenors.

== Discography ==
=== Studio albums ===
Title	Album details	Peak positions			Certifications
Title	Album details	US	US R&B	US Gospel	Certifications
Ghetto Hymns	Released: May 25, 1999; Label: DreamWorks; Formats: CD, cassette	34	5	—	RIAA: Gold
Chicago '85... The Movie	Released: November 21, 2000; Label: DreamWorks; Formats: CD, digital download	49	10	—	RIAA: Gold
Things in the Game Done Changed	Released: September 17, 2002; Label: Goodfellas, Motown; Formats: CD, digital download	10	3	—	
Real Talk	Released: November 11, 2003; Label: DreamWorks; Formats: CD, digital download	42	23	—	
The Book of David: Vol.1 – The Transition	Released: September 26, 2006; Label: GospoCentric, Zomba; Formats: CD, digital download	98	13	1	
Witness Protection	Released: August 5, 2008; Label: GospoCentric, Zomba; Formats: CD, digital download	88	9	2	
Chicago Winds... The Saga Continues	Released: October 21, 2014; Label: eOne; Formats: CD, digital download	110	21	—	
The Manuscript	Released: September 9, 2016; Label: Shanachie; Formats: CD, digital download	—	29	—	

=== Collaboration albums ===
Title	Album details	Peak positions			Certifications
Title	Album details	US	US R&B	US Gospel	Certifications
United Tenors (with Fred Hammond, Eric Roberson, and Brian Courtney Wilson)	Released: April 19, 2013; Label: RCA Inspiration; Formats: CD, digital download	39	—	1	

=== Compilation albums ===
Title	Album details	Peak positions			Certifications
Title	Album details	US	US R&B	US Gospel	Certifications
Lost Tapes	Released: September 16, 2003; Label: Herb N Soul; Formats: CD, digital download	—	—	—	
Definitive Collection	Released: August 22, 2006; Label: UMG, Hip-O; Formats: CD, digital download	140	21	—	
The Best of Dave Hollister	Released: August 12, 2008; Label: UMG, Hip-O; Formats: CD, digital download	—	51	—	

=== Singles ===
Year	Single	Chart positions		Album
Year	Single	US	US R&B	Album
1997	"It's Alright"	—	—	Ghetto Hymns (hidden track)
1998	"The Weekend" (featuring Erick Sermon and Redman)	—	80	Ride soundtrack
1999	"My Favorite Girl"	39	10	Ghetto Hymns
1999	"Can't Stay"	84	28	Ghetto Hymns
1999	"Baby Mama Drama"	—	64	Ghetto Hymns
2000	"One Woman Man"	44	8	Chicago '85... The Movie
2001	"Take Care of Home"	—	39	Chicago '85... The Movie
2002	"Keep Lovin' You"	—	47	Things in the Game Done Changed
2002	"Baby Do Those Things"	—	72	Things in the Game Done Changed
2002	"What's a Man To Do"	—	—	Things in the Game Done Changed
2003	"Tell Me Why"	—	—	Things in the Game Done Changed
2003	"Never Gonna Change"	—	—	Real Talk
2003	"Pleased Tonight"	—	—	Real Talk
2006	"What Do You Do"	—	—	The Book of David: Vol.1 – The Transition
2013	"Here In Our Praise"	—	—	United Tenors
2014	"Spend the Night"	—	—	Chicago Winds... The Saga Continues
2026	"I Thought You Knew"	—	—	
2026	"Voodoo Magic"	—	—	
