= Gemini (Brian McKnight album) =

Album by Brian McKnight

Studio album by Brian McKnight
- Released: February 8, 2005
- Length: 53:39
- Label: Motown
- Producers: Brandon Barnes; Nikki Holliwood; Karma Productions; Brian McKnight; Poke & Tone; Sandy "Sanman" Ruiz

Brian McKnight chronology
U-Turn (2003)	Gemini (2005)	Ten (2006)

Gemini is the eighth studio album by American singer Brian McKnight. It was released by Motown Records on February 8, 2005 in the United States. Named after McKnight's astrological sign, the album expanded beyond his signature romantic ballads to incorporate uptempo, risqué, doo-wop, jazz, and hip hop influences, with collaborations from Juvenile, Akon, and Talib Kweli. McKnight again wrote, produced, and performed most of the material himself. Originally conceived as a double album featuring a separate jazz disc, it was ultimately released as a single album after Motown deemed the format too costly.

Upon release, Gemini received mixed reviews, with critics praising McKnight's vocals and stylistic range while others found his hip hop experimentation and songwriting less convincing. Commercially, Gemini debuted and peaked at number four on the US Billboard 200 with first-week sales of 103,000 units, while reaching number two on the Top R&B/Hip-Hop Albums chart, giving McKnight his highest peaks on both charts at the time. Gemini was preceded by two singles, "Everytime You Go Away" and "What We Do Here," both of which charted in the Top 40 of Billboard's Hot R&B/Hip-Hop Songs chart.

== Background ==
Following the relatively modest commercial performance of his U-Turn (2003), McKnight sought to explore a broader range of styles on his next project for Motown, Gemini. He described the album's material as an attempt to move away from being confined to a particular musical format and instead embrace the different sides of his artistic personality. While the album retained the romantic ballads that had defined much of his career, it also featured more uptempo and risqué material, along with influences from doo-wop and jazz. McKnight continued his interest in hip hop, collaborating with rappers and artists including Juvenile, Akon, and Talib Kweli. Gemini was initially planned as a double album, with one disc devoted to love songs and the other to jazz, a genre McKnight had long admired. However, following changes in Motown's leadership and the appointment of Sylvia Rhone as president, the label decided that releasing a double CD would not be cost-effective. The jazz material was consequently held back, leaving Gemini to combine elements of McKnight's R&B, pop, hip hop, and jazz influences on a single album.

== Critical reception ==
Professional ratings
Review scores
Source	Rating
AllMusic	3.5/5 stars
Blender	4/5 stars
New York Post	3.5/4 stars
PopMatters	6/10 stars
Slant	2/5 stars
Vibe	2.5/5 stars

Gemini received mixed reviews from music critics, who generally praised McKnight's vocals and willingness to broaden his sound but differed on the success of his stylistic experimentation. AllMusic's David Jeffries called Gemini a "loose and free bedroom winner" and praised the album when McKnight "wears all his singer, composer, musician, and producer hats at once," comparing its self-produced material to Prince's self-titled release and Sweetback. Chris Rizik from SoulTracks described the album as "a fairly typical McKnight album that his many (primarily female) fans will adore," praising its "handful of excellent, well performed numbers" while criticizing its "lyrical mixed messages and groupie pandering," which he felt prevented it from reaching the level of its musical foundation. Writing for The New York Post, Dan Aquilante awarded Gemini three and a half stars, praising its "smooth groove" and "raucous side," while noting that collaborations with Talib Kweli, Musiq, Juvenile, and Akon helped McKnight "break a straight-up R&B image" and establish a hip hop presence.

Other critics were more reserved. Sal Cinquemani of Slant praised the album's opening, which showcased McKnight's "old school Motown harmonies," but criticized the remainder of the record for relying on "the mildest of R&B formulas" and hooks that "barely register." PopMatters critics critic Jalylah Burrell was more favorable, arguing that McKnight "manages to escape the lure of his trend-conscious alter ego" and instead remains comfortable in his established musical identity, although she acknowledged that the album was "not all-star caliber but well enough for his faithful fans." People similarly characterized Gemini as "another dependable effort," praising McKnight's "sophisticated soul" while noting that he had been surpassed by both established legends and younger artists such as Van Hunt and John Legend. Gail Mitchell from Billboard concluded that "for the most part, McKnight succeeds in his quest to stretch beyond his love ballad persona," although she felt that his collaborations with rappers "still didn't feel like it fit."

== Chart performance ==
Gemini debuted and peaked at number four on the US Billboard 200 in the week of February 26, 2005, selling 103,000 units in its first week of release. It also debuted at number two on the Top R&B/Hip-Hop Albums chart, giving McKnight his highest-charting album to date on both charts. The album also reached the top 100 in France and the Netherlands. Gemini was McKnight's final album released by Motown.

== Track listing ==
Gemini track listing
No.	Title	Writer(s)	Producer(s)	Length
1.	"Stay With Him (Intro)"	Brian McKnight	Knight	2:46
2.	"What We Do Here"	McKnight	McKnight	3:41
3.	"Everytime You Go Away"	McKnight	McKnight	4:42
4.	"Grown Man Business"	McKnight; Shawn Carter; Jerome Foster; Marcus Miller	Poke & Tone	3:35
5.	"Everything I Do"	McKnight	McKnight	6:39
6.	"Here with You"	McKnight; Brandon Barnes; Barry Gibb; Maurice Gibb; Robin Gibb	McKnight	4:23
7.	"All Over Now"	McKnight; Curry	McKnight	3:31
8.	"She" (featuring Talib Kweli)	McKnight; Carvin Haggins; Ivan Barias; Kweli	Karma Productions; Sandy "Sanman" Ruiz	3:43
9.	"Stay"	McKnight	McKnight	3:57
10.	"Come Back"	McKnight; Barnes; Claude Vernell	McKnight	4:11
11.	"Watcha Gonna Do?" (featuring Akon, Juvenile and Skip)	McKnight; Nicholas Clifford; Terius Gray; Kelii Anthony; Thiam Aliaune	Nikki Holliwood	4:08
12.	"Your Song"	McKnight	McKnight	3:35
13.	"Me & You"	McKnight	McKnight	5:08
Total length:				53:39

Samples

- "Grown Man Business" samples from "Can't Knock the Hustle" by Jay-Z and "Much Too Much" by Marcus Miller.
- "Here with You" samples from "Love You Inside Out" by Bee Gees.

== Charts ==
=== Weekly charts ===
Weekly chart performance for Gemini
Chart (2005)	Peak position
Dutch Albums (Album Top 100)	82
French Albums (SNEP)	97
US Billboard 200	4
US Top R&B/Hip-Hop Albums (Billboard)	2

=== Year-end charts ===
Year-end chart performance for Gemini
Chart (2005)	Position
US Top R&B/Hip-Hop Albums (Billboard)	56
