= Lady Saw discography =

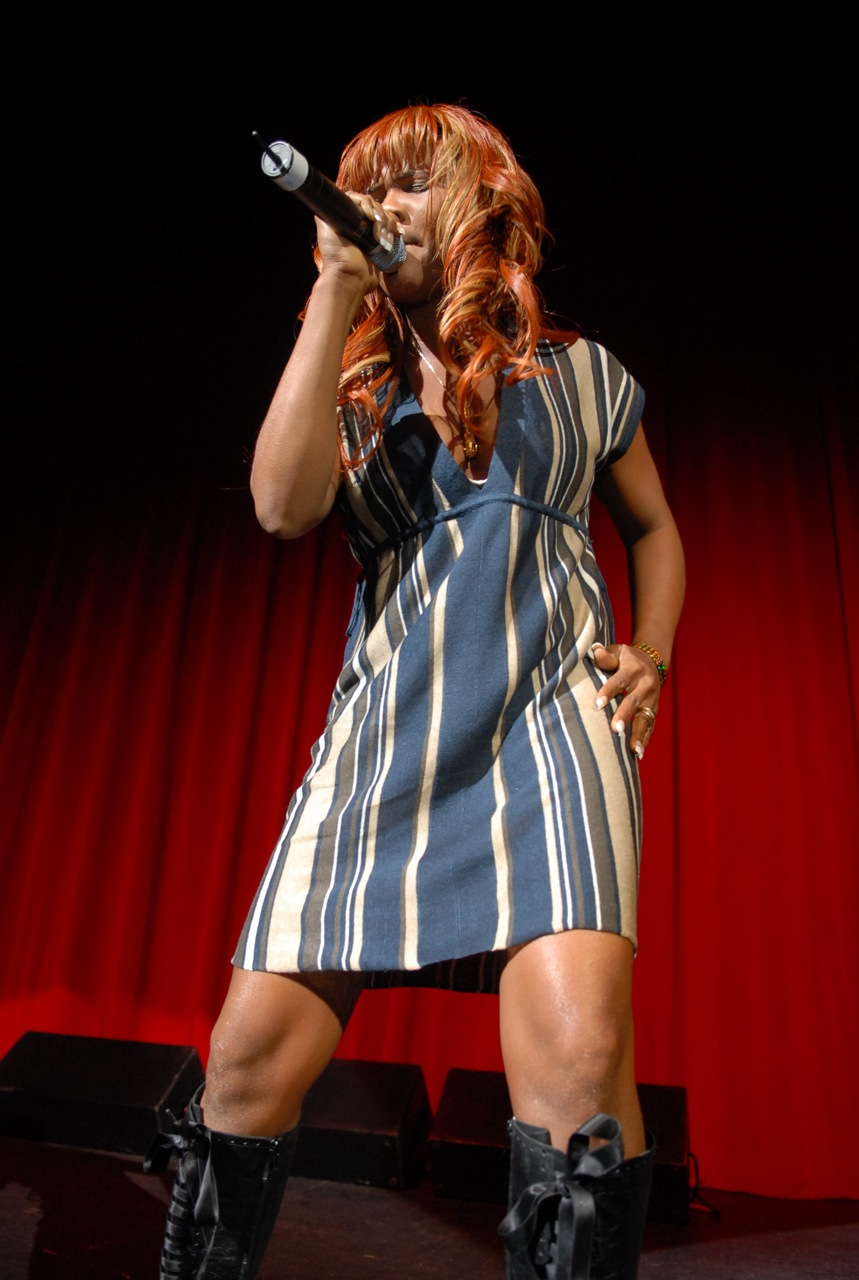
- Studio albums: 10
- Extended plays: 2
- Compilation albums: 3
- Singles: 47

Jamaican singer and songwriter Marion Hall (formerly known as Lady Saw) has released ten studio albums, two compilation albums, three extended plays, and 47 singles. Her success has earned her the honorific title The Queen of Dancehall.

As Lady Saw, she released a total eight studio albums: Lover Girl (1994), Give Me The Reason (1996), Passion (1997), 99 Ways (1998), Strip Tease (2004), Walk Out (2007), My Way (2010), and Alter Ego (2012). In 2002, Saw experienced international success with her collaboration single "Underneath It All" with American ska band No Doubt. The song won a Grammy Award for Best Pop Performance by a Duo or Group with Vocal at the 46th Grammy Awards. In 2004, Saw released "I've Got Your Man", the lead single of Strip Tease, which crossed-over on the R&B charts and peaked at number 58.

In 2016, Minister Marion Hall released her ninth album When God Speaks, dropping the stage name Lady Saw. The album became her highest charting album to date, peaking at number four on Reggae Albums chart. She followed up with the released of her tenth album His Grace in July 2018.

== Albums ==
=== Studio albums ===
List of albums, with selected chart positions, sales figures and certifications
Title	Album details	Peak chart positions	
Title	Album details	US R&B	US Reggae
Lover Girl	Released: August 29, 1994; Label: VP Records	—	—
Give Me the Reason	Released: May 21, 1996; Label: VP	—	—
Passion	Released: June 17, 1997; Label: VP	—	8
99 Ways	Released: December 8, 1998; Label: VP	—	10
Strip Tease	Released: August 24, 2004; Label: VP	84	14
Walk Out	Released: April 17, 2007; Label: VP	—	8
My Way	Released: September 7, 2010; Label: Toasting Music	—	—
Alter Ego	Released: November 18, 2014; Label: Diva's Records / VPAL Music	—	6
When God Speaks (as Marion Hall) (Note: Released and credited under Minister Marion Hall.)	Released: July 15, 2016; Label: VP Records	—	4
His Grace (as Marion Hall)	Released: July 20, 2018; Label: VP Records	—	—

=== Compilations ===
Title	Album details
Raw, the Best of Lady Saw	Released: February 10, 1998; Label: VP; Formats: CD
Extra Raw: The First Lady of Dancehall	Released: July 13, 2009; Label: VP; Formats: CD, digital download

== Extended plays ==
Title	Album details	Notes
Two Man	Released: July 17, 2012; Format: Digital download	No. / Title / Length; 1. / "Two Man (Raw)"; 2. / "Two Man"; 3. / "Me Train You Man"; 4. / "Mi Like Mi Mate (Raw)"; 5. / "Mi Like Mi Mate"; 6. / "Wife a Wife"
Bun Fi Bun	Released: July 2, 2013; Format: Digital download	No. / Title / Length; 1. / "Age Is Just a Number"; 2. / "Two Man (Raw)"; 3. / "Two Man"; 4. / "Mi Train Yuh Man"; 5. / "Mi Like Mi Mate (Raw)"; 6. / "Mi Like Mi Mate"; 7. / "Wife a Wife"; 8. / "Yuh Man Mi a Look"; 9. / "When Mi Left a Man"; 10. / "Bun Fi Bun"
Lady Saw: Special Edition	Released: November 6, 2015; Format: Digital download	No. / Title / Length; 1. / "Addicted"; 2. / "Dedicated to Mama"; 3. / "Sidung (with Elephant Man)"; 4. / "Yuh Think"; 5. / "Save Your Love for Me (with Mega Banton)"

== Singles ==
=== As lead artist ===
Title	Year	Peak chart positions		Album
Title	Year	US R&B	US Rap	Album
"Find a Good Man"	1993	—	—	Lover Girl
"Stab Out the Meat"	1994	—	—	Lover Girl
"Hardcore"	1994	—	—	Lover Girl
"Give Me the Reason"	1996	—	—	Give Me the Reason
"Life Without Dick"	1996	—	—	Give Me the Reason
"Condoms"	1996	—	—	Give Me the Reason
"Good Wuk"	1996	—	—	Give Me the Reason
"Healing" (featuring Beenie Man)	1997	—	—	Passion
"Sycamore Tree"	1997	—	—	Passion
"Woman Mi Name"	1997	—	—	Passion
"Gal No Worry"	1998	—	—	Passion
"Find a Good Man"	1998	—	—	Raw, the Best of Lady Saw
"Hice It Up"	1998	—	—	Raw, the Best of Lady Saw
"99 Ways"	1998	—	—	99 Ways
"Son of a B!tch"	2001	88	19	Non-album single
"I've Got Your Man"	2004	58	—	Strip Tease
"Man Is the Least"	2004	—	—	Strip Tease
"Loser" (featuring Ce'Cile)	2005	—	—	Strip Tease
"No Less Than a Woman (Infertility)"	2007	—	—	Walk Out
"Chat to Mi Back"	2007	—	—	Walk Out
"Me and My Crew (The Rae)"	2007	—	—	Walk Out
"Party 'Til December"	2010	—	—	My Way
"When Mi Left a Man"	2011	—	—	Non-album singles
"When Mi See a Gal"	2012	—	—	Non-album singles
"Heels On"	2012	—	—	Non-album singles
"Bun Fi Bun"	2013	—	—	Bun Fi Bun - EP
"Nuh Tek Mi Man"	2013	—	—	Non-album singles
"Don't Wanna Fight" (featuring Jah Cure)	2013	—	—	Non-album singles
"Seasons Greetings"	2013	—	—	Non-album singles
"IDC (I Don't Care)"	2014	—	—	Non-album singles
"If Yuh Gyal Did Eva"	2014	—	—	Non-album singles
"Ask Dem Artist (Wah Dem a War Fah)"	2014	—	—	Non-album singles
"Scammer"	2015	—	—	Non-album singles
"Incline Thine Ears"	2015	—	—	Non-album singles
"Last Night"	2015	—	—	Non-album singles
"The Devil Have a Way"	2015	—	—	Non-album singles
"The Day Will Never Come"	2015	—	—	Non-album singles
"Likkle Bit"	2015	—	—	Non-album singles
"Lay on Your Body"	2015	—	—	Non-album singles
"I Had Jesus" (as Marion Hall)	2016	—	—	When God Speaks
"Room in My House" (as Marion Hall)	2016	—	—	When God Speaks
"I'm Gonna Fast" (as Marion Hall)	2018	—	—	His Grace
"Lord We Need You" (as Marion Hall)	2018	—	—	His Grace

=== As a featured artist ===
Title	Year	Peak chart positions										Certifications	Album
Title	Year	US	AUS	AUT	BE	CAN	FR	GER	NED	SWE	UK	Certifications	Album
"Smile" (Vitamin C featuring Lady Saw)	1999	18	138	—	—	29	—	13	95	—	—	RIAA: Gold	Vitamin C
"Bump 'n' Grind (I Am Feeling Hot Tonight)" (M-Dubs featuring Lady Saw)	2000	—	—	—	—	—	—	—	—	—	59		Non-album single
"Since I Met You Lady" (UB40 featuring Lady Saw)	2001	—	—	—	—	—	—	—	69	—	40		Cover Up
"Underneath It All" (No Doubt featuring Lady Saw)	2002	3	28	34	13	35	71	8	42	39	18		Rock Steady
"Bossman" (Beenie Man featuring Lady Saw and Sean Paul)	2003	—	—	—	—	—	—	—	—	—	78		Tropical Storm
"Pray for You" (Carlene Davis featuring Marion Hall)	2018	—	—	—	—	—	—	—	—	—	—		The Assignment
