= Vitamin C discography =

Discography of American singer Vitamin C

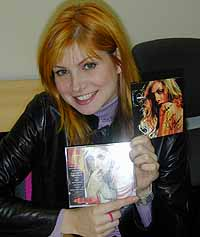
- Vitamin C promoting her second solo album More.
- Studio albums: 2
- Soundtrack albums: 7
- Singles: 6
- Music videos: 6

American pop singer Vitamin C released two studio albums, 7 soundtrack songs, 6 music videos and 6 singles, including her Top 20 single on the Billboard Hot 100, "Smile" featuring Jamaican singer Lady Saw.

Her eponymous debut album, Vitamin C, was released on August 31, 1999, via Elektra Records and Warner Music Group. The album initially was a commercial failure, not charting on the Billboard 200. However, eventually, it peaked at number 29 on the chart, as well as 3 on the Billboard Top Heatseekers chart. The album was certified Platinum by the RIAA. The album's first single, "Smile", made its way into the Top 20 of the Hot 100, where it reached number 18. The single was also certified Gold by the RIAA. The follow-up single "Me, Myself & I" did not match the success of "Smile", only peaking at number 20 on the Billboard Bubbling Under Hot 100 Singles. A third and final single, "Graduation (Friends Forever)", was released in 2000 and peaked at number 38. It became her second and final Top 40 single on the Hot 100; however, it did reach number 2 on the Australian ARIA Charts and was certified Platinum.

At the end of 2000, Vitamin C released the lead single, "The Itch", for her second studio album, More. The single missed the Top 40, only reaching number 45. In Australia it peaked at number 6 on the ARIA Charts and was certified Platinum. The second single from More, "As Long as You're Loving Me", failed to make the Hot 100, only charting in New Zealand at number 45. The album, however, was even less of a success, only charting in the lower 100 of the Billboard 200 at number 122. As her popularity began to decline, Vitamin C signed with V2 Records to record a third album. The lead single, "Last Nite", was only released in the United Kingdom. It was a disappointment to the label after only debuting and peaking at number 70 on the UK Singles Chart. Vitamin C was then dropped from the label and no new album surfaced.

As of 2012, Vitamin C is the Vice President of Music for Nickelodeon under her birth name, Colleen Fitzpatrick, according to The Hollywood Reporter. In 2016 Fitzpatrick, under the Vitamin C moniker, appeared on the song "Don't You Want Me" by Information Society, on their album Orders of Magnitude.

== Albums ==
=== Studio albums ===
Title	Details	Peak chart positions				Certifications (sales threshold)
Title	Details	US	US Heat.	AUS	NZ	Certifications (sales threshold)
Vitamin C	Release date: August 31, 1999; Label: Elektra/Warner Music Group	29	3	—	—	RIAA: Platinum
More	Release date: January 30, 2001; Label: Elektra/Warner Music Group	122	—	25	40	
"—" denotes releases that did not chart

== Singles ==
Year	Single	Peak chart positions										Certifications (sales threshold)	Album
Year	Single	US	US Pop	US Adult	AUS	CAN	CAN AC	IRE	NZ	SWE	UK	Certifications (sales threshold)	Album
1999	"Smile"	18	21	35	138	29	74	—	13	—	—	RIAA: Gold	Vitamin C
1999	"Me, Myself & I"	— (Note: "Me, Myself & I" did not enter the Billboard Hot 100, but peaked at number 20 on the Bubbling Under Hot 100 chart.)	36	—	—	—	—	—	—	—	—		Vitamin C
2000	"Graduation (Friends Forever)"	38	12	22	2	7	33	4	21	13	—	ARIA: Platinum	Vitamin C
2000	"The Itch"	45	26	—	6	16	—	—	34	—	—	ARIA: Platinum	More
2001	"As Long as You're Loving Me"	—	—	—	—	—	—	—	45	—	—		More
2003	"Last Nite"	—	—	—	—	—	—	—	—	—	70		Non-album single
"—" denotes releases that did not chart

== Music videos ==
Year	Song	Director
1999	"Smile"	Christopher Erskin
1999	"Me, Myself & I"	Nigel Dick
2000	"Graduation (Friends Forever)"	Gregory Dark
2000	"The Itch"	Brothers Strause
2001	"As Long as You're Loving Me"	
2003	"Last Nite"	

== Soundtrack songs/B-sides ==
Year	Song	Album
1999	"December, 1963 (Oh, What a Night)"	Non-album song
1999	"Vacation"	Pokémon: The First Movie
2000	"This Summer I"	(Japanese bonus track) from More
2000	"The Only One"	(Japanese bonus track) from Vitamin C
2000	"Smash It Up"	Non-album song
2000	"Do You C What I C?"	On the Line
2001	"September" (featuring Sisqó)	Get Over It
2001	"Love Will Keep Us Together"	Get Over It
2002	"Master of Disguise"	Master of Disguise
2003	"Learning to Love the Enemy"	Non-album song
2003	"Volare"	The Lizzie McGuire Movie
2005	"Voices Carry"	Sky High
2005	"Kiss the Girl"	Disneymania 3
