= More (Vitamin C album) =

Studio album by Vitamin C
- Released: January 30, 2001
- Genre: Electropop
- Length: 42:47
- Labels: Elektra; Warner Music Group
- Producers: Ron Baldwin (exec.); Jimmy Harry; Josh Deutsch

Vitamin C chronology
Vitamin C (1999)	More (2001)

Singles from More
- 1. "The Itch" Released: October 10, 2000; 2. "As Long as You're Loving Me" Released: January 23, 2001

Professional ratings
Aggregate scores
Source	Rating
Metacritic	69/100
Review scores
Source	Rating
AllMusic	4/5 stars
The A.V. Club	(mixed)
Entertainment Weekly	B
Los Angeles Times	1.5/4 stars
People	(favorable)
Rolling Stone	3.5/5 stars
Spin	7/10
Wall of Sound	59/100

More is the second studio album released by pop singer Vitamin C in 2001. The album was not as successful as Vitamin C's previous eponymous album both in terms of chart positions and sales, peaking at number 122 on the Billboard 200 albums chart.

The album was preceded by the single "The Itch", which peaked at number six in Australia. The second single, "As Long as You're Loving Me" was also included on the 2001 soundtrack to the comedy film See Spot Run. "I Know What Boys Like" is a cover of the 1980s band the Waitresses. Like her debut, the Japanese version of the album contains a bonus track, "This Summer I".

== Track listing ==
No.	Title	Writer(s)	Producer	Length
1.	"The Itch"	Colleen Fitzpatrick; Jimmy Harry; Billy Steinberg	Jimmy Harry	3:30
2.	"Sex Has Come Between Us"	Fitzpatrick; Harry; Steinberg	Harry	2:57
3.	"That Was Then, This Is Now"	Fitzpatrick; Josh Deutsch	Josh Deutsch	4:07
4.	"Dangerous Girl"	Billy Mann; Andy Marvel	Billy Mann • Andy Marvel	3:44
5.	"She Talks About Love"	Fitzpatrick; Michael Kotch	Michael Kotch	3:29
6.	"I Know What Boys Like"	Chris Butler	Deutsch	3:25
7.	"Busted"	Fitzpatrick; Christian Karlsson; Fredrik Odesjo	Bloodshy	3:24
8.	"Special"	Fitzpatrick	Deutsch	4:45
9.	"Where's the Party"	Fitzpatrick; Harry	Harry	2:57
10.	"I Can't Say No"	Fitzpatrick; Karlsson; Pontus Winnberg	Bloodshy	3:05
11.	"Real Life"	David Frank; Pam Sheyne	David Frank	3:19
12.	"As Long as You're Loving Me"	Guy Roche; Shelly Peiken	Guy Roche	4:12
Total length:				42:44

Australian, New Zealand and Malaysian bonus tracks
No.	Title	Writer(s)	Length
13.	"Smile" (featuring Lady Saw)	Fitzpatrick; Deutsch	3:58
14.	"Graduation (Friends Forever)"	Fitzpatrick; Deutsch	5:40

Japanese bonus track
No.	Title	Writer(s)	Length
15.	"This Summer I"	Fitzpatrick; Lauren Christy	3:32

Bonus VCD
No.	Title	Length
1.	"The Itch" (music video)
2.	"As Long as You're Loving Me" (music video)
3.	"Graduation (Friends Forever)" (music video)
4.	"Smile" (music video)

== Charts ==
Chart (2001)	Peak position
Australian Albums (ARIA)	25
Australian Dance Albums (ARIA)	7
New Zealand Albums (RMNZ)	40
US Billboard 200	122
