= Davetta Sherwood =

American actress and musician

- Born: January 27, 1984 (age 42); Mount Vernon, New York, United States
- Origin: Los Angeles, California, United States
- Occupations: Actress, musician, model
- Years active: 2000–2015

Davetta Sherwood (born January 27, 1984) is an American former actress and musician. Sherwood first worked as a child model before venturing into an acting career including appearing in music videos and guest appearances. Her breakthrough acting role was on the Emmy award-winning soap opera The Young and the Restless, which earned her a nomination for the NAACP Image Award for "Outstanding Actress in a Daytime Drama Series". In 2008, she launched her production company, 5 Foot Nuthin Productions.

== Early life ==
Sherwood was born in Mount Vernon, New York. She was raised a devout Roman Catholic. At a young age, her parents divorced. Sherwood later began acting at the age of seven and appeared in several school productions throughout middle and high school including A Raisin in the Sun, The Wizard of Oz and Annie.

At the age of 8, Sherwood and her mother left New York for Maryland. Sherwood began to show an interest in acting and her mother took notice. Her mother took on the role of 'momager' and along with Sherwood left Maryland for Inland Empire, California. She attended Pershing Middle School, Valley View High School as well as the prestigious boarding school Northfield Mount Hermon School during the summer.

In 2002, Sherwood enrolled in a program at University of California, Riverside so she could finish high school and start college simultaneously, although she did not finish college. She is represented by the Williams Talent Agency. She owns an entertainment and event company, Liaison Inc., which, with the help of a business partner in Atlanta, Georgia, is responsible for producing and coordinating entertainment-oriented events, like the after-party and fashion show for Miami's "Swim Week".

== Acting career ==
Sherwood started her career in show business as a child print model for companies such as Sears and Atlantic City. At the age of 15, she wrote, cast, directed and produced Davetta Sherwood's First Annual Variety Art show. The charity event raised the most in a single night in her high school's history and funded new art and stage equipment.

Sherwood later began taking acting lessons and landed a guest role on the TV sitcom My Wife and Kids. In 2003, she was cast in the short lived series Platinum as the feisty Jade Rhames alongside Sticky Fingaz and Jason George. The show was written by Sofia Coppola and was about two brothers who ran a hip hop record label. it was canceled and only aired six episodes. During 2003, Sherwood guest starred on Boston Public, in which she played Dina Fallow. In 2005, she appeared in two films: as Tosha Cooper in Back in the Day, alongside Tatyana Ali, and as Patty in the horror film Venom, also starring Agnes Bruckner and Jonathan Jackson. Venom was harshly received by critics, with Entertainment Weekly dubbing it a "crappy horror movie". She guest starred on The Bernie Mac Show as Sherri in the episode Jack and Jacqueline.

In 2006, Sherwood was cast as Lily Winters on The Young and the Restless. In late September 2006, Soap Central reported that Sherwood had been dropped and that the role of Lily would again be played by Christel Khalil, who had left the role the previous year. Sherwood was nominated for an NAACP Image Award for "Outstanding Actress in a Daytime Drama Series" in 2007.

In 2007, Sherwood debuted on stage in the play The Divorce and later starred in the play Pleasant ville, both of which were written by her friend and production manager Chris Mykel Dabney. In April 2007, it was announced that Sherwood would be in the independent film H.N.I.C., which rapper Prodigy would produce. In early 2008, Davetta starred in the independent film A Talent for Trouble as Jessica. In 2008, Sherwood launched her own production company, 5 Foot Nuthin Productions, which, in conjunction with YAV Productions, produced a series of television shows and films intended to start airing in the fall of 2009. Sherwood is currently in the process of writing, producing, and directing her own stage play, Exactly Different. Other projects include The Yes We Will Project, Bounce, and Pleasantville.

In 2013, she starred in Boiling Pot, which is based on true events of racism that occurred on college campuses across the country during the 2008 Presidential election. The film, written and directed by the Ashmawey brothers under AshmaweyFilms, also stars Academy Award winner Louis Gossett Jr., Danielle Fishel, Keith David, M. Emmet Walsh, and John Heard. Sherwood plays the president of the Black Student Union, struggling to use the system in place to fight the racist events happening on her campus. Boiling Pot was set for release in 2014.

== Music career ==
Sherwood has appeared in music videos such as Vitamin C's video "Graduation (Friends Forever)", according to a radio interview Sherwood did, she said that Vitamin C picked her for the video because she reminded her of Vitamin C's best friend. She was also in Bow Wow's video My Baby as his love interest Kim, and Lil J's video It's the Weekend.

Davetta Sherwood announced on her Myspace that she'll be recording her demo songs and should expect details from her when the songs are ready. The lyrics will be from her poetry book that she's been writing for almost three years and will have soul and alternative styles. She will also be writing songs for her stage play Exactly Different.

== Personal life ==
Sherwood expressed a strong liking to indie rock, old school hip hop and neo soul. She also cites on her Myspace the Canadian rock band Hot Hot Heat as her favorite indie rock band. Sherwood is good friends with Monique Coleman, Erica Hubbard, Kimberly Kevon Williams, as well as former Y&R co-star Victoria Rowell.

As of 2013, she has been raising her two-year-old nephew, Bryce, for the last year and a half.

== Filmography ==
Films

Year	Title	Role	Notes
2005	Back in the Day	Tosha Cooper	Supporting role
2005	Venom	Patty	Miramax/Dimension
2008	A Talent For Trouble	Jessica	Supporting Lead
2009	H.N.I.C	TBA	Supporting role
2011	The Thing	Davida Morris	filming
2012	The Love Section	Sandrine Darden	Main Character
2015	Boiling Pot	Rose Torrance	filming

Television

Year	Title	Role	Notes
2003	Platinum	Jade Rhames	Regular
2006	The Young and the Restless	Lily Winters	Main role: February 7 – November 3, 2006

Guest Appearances

Year	Title	Role	Notes
2003	My Wife and Kids	Unknown	Brief appearance
2003–2004	Boston Public	Dina Fallow	2 episodes
2005	The Bernie Mac Show	Sherri	Episode: Jack & Jacqueline
2006	Soap Talk	Herself	1 episode
2009	90210	Sasha's Friend	Cameo

=== Awards and nominations ===
Year	Award	Category	Motive	Result
2007	NAACP Image Award	"Outstanding Actress in a Daytime Drama Series"	The Young and the Restless	Nominated

== Discography ==
Soundtrack

- Exactly Different soundtrack (upcoming soundtrack from the stage play)

Music videos

Year	Title	Role	Notes
2000	Graduation (Friends Forever)	Lynn	Plays Vitamin C's best friend
2002	It's the Weekend	Sheryl	Lead
2003	My Baby	Kim	Lead
