= Vitamin C (disambiguation) =

Vitamin C is an essential nutrient, the compound L-ascorbic acid.

Vitamin C may also refer to:

- Vitamin C (singer), an American pop music singer, dancer and actress
  - Vitamin C (album), her debut album
- "Vitamin C" (song), a song by Can

== See also ==
- Chemistry of ascorbic acid
- Vitamin C and the common cold
- Vitamin C deficiency or scurvy
- Vitamin C megadosage, high doses used in an attempt to obtain specific therapeutic effects
