= Jesus Loves You =

Jesus Loves You could refer to:

- Jesus Loves You (band), a British band that included Boy George
- "Jesus Loves You (But Not As Much As I Do)", a song by Eve's Plum from album Cherry Alive
- "Jesus Loves You", a song by Jewel from her album This Way
- "Jesus Loves You", a song by Christian pop punk band Stellar Kart from their album Expect the Impossible

== See also ==
- "Jesus Loves Me", a Christian hymn written by Anna Bartlett Warner
