= Envy (Eve's Plum album) =

Studio album by Eve's Plum
- Released: August 31, 1993
- Recorded: 1991–1993
- Genre: Alternative rock, grunge, alternative metal
- Length: 48:11
- Label: 550, Epic
- Producer: Steve Boyer

Eve's Plum chronology
Envy (1993)	Cherry Alive (1995)

Singles from Envy
- 1. "Blue" Released: 1993; 2. "Die Like Someone" Released: 1993; 3. "I Want It All" Released: 1994

Professional ratings
Review scores
Source	Rating
AllMusic	3/5 stars

Envy is the debut studio album by American rock band Eve's Plum. It was released on August 31, 1993, on 550 Records. Before it was released, the debut single, "Blue," was promoted on MTV, appearing on an episode of Beavis and Butthead. However, the single and album failed to chart. The second single, "Die Like Someone," was released in a censored version the following year and also failed to chart. The third single, "I Want It All," became the band's only single to chart, peaking at number 30 on the Modern Rock Chart. However, the album still failed to chart, and promotion for the album was halted. The album is the band's only to feature original bassist Chris Giammalvo, who left the band the following year and was replaced by Theo Mack, who performed on the band's following album Cherry Alive (1995) and remained with the band until they disbanded in 1998.

== Critical reception ==
Trouser Press wrote: "With nods at dance music, new wave and au courant punk, Envy reflects the musical climate of its year of release, only the hooks are minimal and the quartet sounds as if it’s learning songwriting on the fly."

Perfect Sound Forever remarked that the single "Blue" "has one of the best riffs of the whole alt rock era."

== Track listing ==
All songs written by Eve's Plum, except where noted.

1. "Blue"
2. "I Want It All"
3. "Once Twice"
4. "Venus Meets Pluto"
5. "Lovely You"
6. "On The Outside"
7. "Die Like Someone" (Eve's Plum, Roger Greenawalt)
8. "Believable" (Eve's Plum, Roger Greenawalt)
9. "I Might Die"
10. "Kiss Your Feet"
11. "Envy [Bonus Track]"

== Personnel ==
- Eve's Plum (Main Performer)
  - Colleen Fitzpatrick (Vocals)
  - Michael Kotch (Guitar)
  - Ben Kotch (Drums)
  - Chris Giammalvo (Bass)
- Steve Boyer (Producer and Engineer),
- Victor Deyglio (Assistant Engineer),
- Don Fleming (Electric and Acoustic Guitar)
- Roger Greenawalt (Producer, Acoustic Guitar and Tambourine)
- Steve Sisco (Mixing Assistant)
- Andy Wallace (Mixing)
- Howie Weinberg (Mastering),
- Art Smith (Instrumental),
- Scott Hollingsworth (Assistant Engineer)
- Sara Rotman (Art Direction)
- JoAnn Toy (Photography)
