= Da Hip Hop Witch =

- Directed by: Dale Resteghini
- Written by: Dale Resteghini
- Produced by: Robert A. Flutie; Kim Resteghini; Dale Resteghini
- Starring: Eminem; Mobb Deep; Ja Rule; Rah Digga; Killah Priest; Pras
- Cinematography: Martin Ahlgren; Dale Resteghini
- Edited by: Namakula
- Music by: Terence Dudley; Rob Gay L.G. Tony Prendatt
- Production company: Barnholtz Entertainment
- Distributed by: A-Pix Entertainment; Artisan Entertainment
- Release date: August 8, 2000
- Running time: 90 minutes
- Country: United States
- Language: English

Da Hip Hop Witch is a 2000 American comedy film directed, produced and written by Dale Resteghini. A parody of the 1999 independent horror film The Blair Witch Project, the film features appearances by musicians Eminem, Mobb Deep, Ja Rule, Rah Digga, Killah Priest, Pras, Vitamin C and Vanilla Ice.

== Plot ==
After learning about the "Hip Hop Witch", a powerful supernatural being that lurks in the ghettos and attacks upcoming rappers which makes their record sales go up, five suburban teenagers go on a quest to get their rap careers started by being attacked by this "Hip Hop Witch". Filming their experience, they run into past hip hop stars that have already battled the Witch in person.

== Cast ==
- Dale Resteghini as Will Hunting
- Stacii Jae Johnson as Dee Dee Washington
- Amy Dorris as Raven (a.k.a. Rave Girl)
- Parker Holt as Jerry (a.k.a. Da Retard)
- Jordan Ashley as The Whisk
- Steve Grillo as Muzzle
- Elijah Rhoades as Big Z
- Tony Prendatt as Lazarus
- La the Darkman as the Street Don
- David Scott Klein as Krump
- Sheritta Duran as Josephine
- Joyce Tanksley as Kitty Smith
- Charlene Quashie as Elisabeth
- Culver Casson as Sara
- Jolene Vettese as Paula
- Pamela Schamberge as Kathy
- Dina Herdigein as Dina
- William Harbour as Shaggy

=== As themselves ===
- Eminem as himself
- Pras as himself
- Vanilla Ice as himself
- Ja Rule as himself
- Rah Digga as herself
- Vitamin C as herself (credited as Vitamin-C)
- Charli Baltimore as herself
- Spliff Star as himself
- Killah Priest as himself
- Mia Tyler as herself
- Royce da 5'9" as himself (credited as Royce 5'9")
- Outsidaz as themselves (credited as The Outsidaz)
- Severe as himself
- Mobb Deep as themselves
- Chris Simmons as himself
- The Cella Dwellas as themselves
- Made Men as themselves
- Professor X as himself
- Rock as himself
- Afu-Ra as himself
- Lidu Rock as himself
- Rhythm Trip as themselves

== Release ==
Preceding the film's release, Eminem's lawyers attempted to have his scenes removed from the film, and tried to halt its distribution. In 2003, Artisan Entertainment planned to reissue the film on VHS and DVD with artwork prominently advertising Eminem's appearance in the film. Before the film's reissue, Artisan recalled copies featuring this artwork without official explanation.
