= Platinum (TV series) =

Television series

- Genre: Drama
- Created by: Sofia Coppola; John Ridley
- Starring: Sticky Fingaz; Jason George; Lalanya Masters; Davetta Sherwood; Vishiss; Tony Nardi; Steven Pasquale; Sarah Manninen; N'Bushe Wright; Kia Goodwin; Terry Crews
- Opening theme: "Music" by Erick Sermon and Marvin Gaye
- Composer: Photek
- Country of origin: United States
- Original language: English
- No. of seasons: 1
- No. of episodes: 6

Production
- Executive producers: John Ridley; Sofia Coppola; Francis Ford Coppola; Bob Greenblatt; David Janollari; Maira Suro
- Running time: 60 minutes
- Production companies: American Zoetrope; The Greenblatt/Janollari Studio; International Famous Players Radio Corporation; Eye Productions

Original release
- Network: UPN
- Release: April 14 – May 13, 2003

Platinum is an American drama series which aired on UPN from April 14 to May 13, 2003. Created by Sofia Coppola and John Ridley, the series is a family saga that follows two brothers who own and operate a record company.

== Premise ==
Brothers and record industry moguls Jackson and Grady Rhames are the archetype of rags-to-riches success after building their company, Sweetback Entertainment, from the ground up. Clawing their way up from the streets, the brothers have created a successful record company in the high-stakes hip-hop music business. Though they are deeply trusting of and dependent upon one another, the brothers approach business in starkly contrasting fashions.

Set in New York City against the backdrop of the glamorous hip-hop lifestyle, the series portrays a cutthroat and sometimes dangerous business notorious for its flashy stars with money to burn and ruthless record executives who stop at nothing to make it big. Standing by the brothers' side is their childhood friend and chief counsel David Ross, their younger sister Jade Rhames and Jackson's wife Monica Rhames.

== Cast ==
- Sticky Fingaz as Grady Rhames
- Jason George as Jackson Rhames
- Lalanya Masters as Monica Rhames
- Davetta Sherwood as Jade Rhames
- Vishiss as VersIs
- Tony Nardi as Nick Tashjian
- Steven Pasquale as David Ross
- Sarah Manninen as Olivia Ross
- N'Bushe Wright as Max Colt
- Kia Goodwin as Lady Bryce
- Terry Crews as Baby

== Episodes ==
No.	Title	Directed by	Written by	Original release date
1	"Flow"	Kevin Bray	Story by : Sofia Coppola & John Ridley; Teleplay by : John Ridley	April 14, 2003
2	"Want"	Clement Virgo	John Ridley	April 15, 2003
3	"Love"	Kevin Bray	John Ridley	April 22, 2003
4	"Loyalty"	Marcus Raboy	Stacy Littlejohn	April 29, 2003
5	"Power"	Gloria Muzio	Kevin Arkadie	May 6, 2003
6	"Peace"	John Ridley	John Ridley	May 13, 2003

== Development ==
John Ridley co-created the series with Sofia Coppola. After three years of not finding a network, the series was picked up by UPN with an order of six episodes. In the interim, a deal with HBO fell through and at one point, producers had a deal with Fox. The show was originally titled Empire, but producers could not secure the rights to the name and instead went with Platinum.

Ridley spoke of networks’ resistance to shows focused on black culture as the reason for the time it took for the series to air, saying, "Hip-hop is very multicultural and we want to make the show multicultural, but it's still ingrained in black culture and there's just not a lot of venues serving people of color. It's a struggle. A lot of networks are just ignoring a segment of the population."

Francis Ford Coppola served an executive producer for the show. Ridley served as the primary showrunner when Sofia Coppola left production to film Lost in Translation.

== Broadcast ==
Platinum premiered on April 14, 2003 in the 9 p.m. time slot, with its second episode airing the following night. Episodes thereafter aired on Tuesday nights.

== Critical reception ==
The series received critical acclaim, and on review aggregator Rotten Tomatoes, season one has an approval rating of 83% based on 12 reviews.

Josh Friedman of the Los Angeles Times wrote, "The hip-hop industry saga Platinum feels as fresh and exhilarating as an HBO discovery, but, yep, that is broadcast TV you’re watching. The stylish, often-satirical hourlong drama [is] reminiscent of The Sopranos and Six Feet Under in its wry portrayal of an unusual and cutthroat family business". Alessandra Stanley of The New York Times said the series is "well made, imaginative and fun, and its willingness to explore new ground is particularly a credit to UPN". Writing for Time, James Poniewozik said, "In the first episode, the show is adventurous and provocative enough to deserve a chance. In an easy-listening TV season, Platinum has got a beat, and you can think to it."

== Cancelation ==
Despite strong reviews, Platinum was cancelled in May 2003 for low ratings and high production costs.

In a retrospective commentary, Jon Caramanica of The New York Times said the show was a forerunner to the 2015 hit series Empire, which also concerned a family-owned hip-hop label. Caramanica called Platinum a rarity for its time as it was "an hour-length network drama revolving around black characters who came from a range of socio-economic and cultural backgrounds." He also praised the show for its depiction of female characters and "story lines [that] took hip-hop’s traditional masculinity to task."
