= Let's Get Down (Bow Wow song) =

Single by Bow Wow featuring Baby

from the album Unleashed
- A-side: "Follow Me"
- Released: June 24, 2003
- Recorded: 2002–03
- Genre: Hip-hop; pop rap
- Length: 4:21
- Label: Columbia
- Songwriters: Shad Moss, Phalon Alexander, Rahman Griffin, Clifford Harris
- Producer: Jazze Pha

Bow Wow singles chronology
"Basketball" (2002)	"Let's Get Down" (2003)	"My Baby" (2003)

Baby singles chronology
"Baby You Can Do It" (2003)	"Let's Get Down" (2003)	"Get Your Shine On" (2004)

Music video
- "Let's Get Down" on YouTube

"Let's Get Down" is a song by American rapper Bow Wow, released on June 24, 2003 as the first single off his third album Unleashed (2003). The song was written by Bow Wow, Jazze Pha, Rahman Griffin and a then-unknown T.I. It was produced by Jazze Pha and features rapper Birdman under his former alias Baby. It was the first song to be released by Bow Wow without the "Lil'" moniker in his name after making his film debut in 2002's Like Mike and releasing his cover of "Basketball" for the film's soundtrack. Bow Wow said that following the name change, he wanted to do the same with his music by contributing more into the songwriting process of the album and release a single that matched his new image.

"Let's Get Down" garnered a positive reception from critics who credited Bow Wow for displaying some maturity in his music. It peaked at number 14 on the Billboard Hot 100, his highest charting single on that chart until 2005's "Like You" featuring Ciara and "Let Me Hold You" featuring Omarion. It also peaked at numbers 6, 8 and 12 on the Hot Rap Songs, Rhythmic Top 40 and Hot R&B/Hip-Hop Songs charts respectively. A music video by Bryan Barber was made to promote the single that features Bow Wow getting his driver's license.

== Background and development ==
In 2002, after finishing production on his debut film Like Mike and releasing his cover of "Basketball" for the film's soundtrack, In 2003, Bow Wow dropped the "Lil'" moniker from his name completely. In an interview with MTV, he said he wanted to distinguish himself from the other rappers who had the word in their moniker:

"All these Lil' rappers, I’m just kind of getting real irritated by it. I said, 'You know what? Drop the Lil'. Forget it. I'm Bow Wow.' Besides, I'm growing up, I'm not little anymore. [I just decided] two weeks ago. I really got irritable. It's all these Lil' cats, forget it. I’m Bow Wow now. Everything is just 'Bow Wow,' no 'Lil' Bow Wow.'"

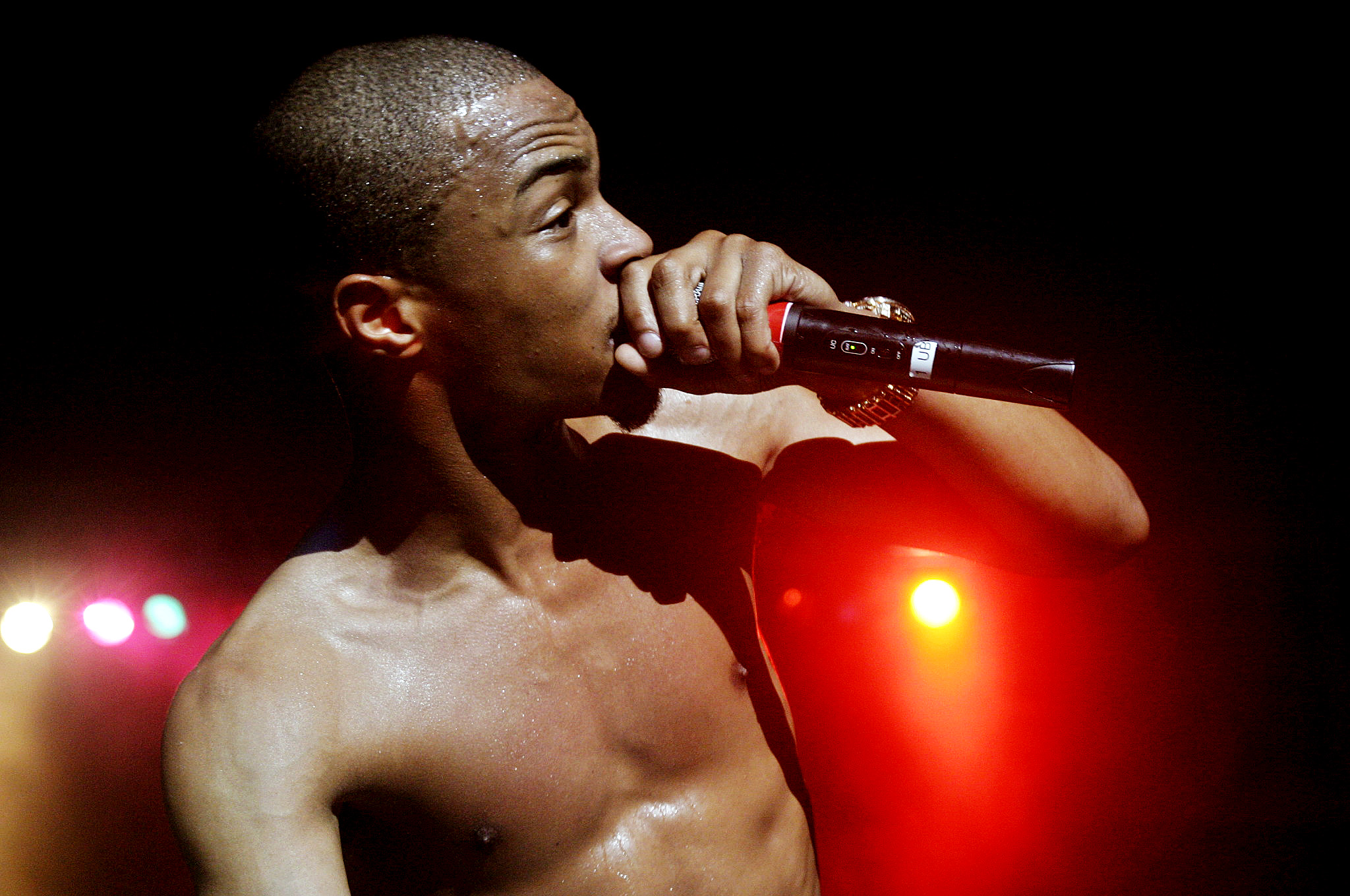
T.I. had a ghostwriting credit on the song.

"Let's Get Down" was produced by Jazze Pha, who previously did production for other rappers like Erick Sermon and Ludacris. The song was written by Shad Moss, Phalon Alexander, Rahman Griffin and Clifford Harris (aka then-unknown T.I.). Donnie Kwak of Vibe described the song as a clone of Baby's "Do That...," with "youthful flirting replacing sleazy come-ons." In an interview with Billboard, he commented on wanting to make an impact after changing his name and wanting to work with rapper Baby, saying that he was looking for a single that would grab people's attention and that Baby's inclusion almost didn't happen but then changed his mind to work with him on the song.

In a September 2003 interview with website Whudat, T.I. talked about his contribution to Bow Wow's third album Unleashed and the song itself:

"Yeah this time around I wrote some songs for him. Even on the single, 'Let's Get Down'. I wrote the third verse and the hook. Usually how we did it was [Jazze Pha] he'll write one verse, Bow Wow would write one verse, his homeboy Rocka would write one, and I'd write a verse and come up with the hook."

In a 2009 interview with HipHopDX, Bow Wow commented on how getting T.I. to ghostwrite for him on his third album didn't tarnish his credibility as a rapper, saying that he learned about the songwriting process by contributing about 85 percent to the album while T.I. wrote a full song and a couple verses to a few tracks.

== Critical reception ==
"Let's Get Down" received a positive reception from music critics. Rashaun Hall of Billboard praised Jazze Pha's production and Bow Wow for maturing as an MC. He added that, "[w]hile Bow Wow's more mature stance suits him well, it will be interesting to see how his younger fans and mainstream R&B radio react to the teenage MC's new image. Either way, Bow Wow has proven that his act is no child's play." Steve 'Flash' Juon of RapReviews was also positive towards the song saying, "Annoying bird calls aside, it is a catchy song about Bow Wow trying to catch a little punani."

In 2004, it won an award in the R&B/Hip-Hop category at the SESAC 2004 New York Music Awards, along with the second single "My Baby" featuring Jagged Edge. In 2013, Complex added the song in its list of nineteen great songs made by teenage rappers in the last 19 years. Complex editor Kyle Kramer praised Bow Wow's transition from child to teen rapper through his boasting ability, saying "With a T.I.-esque flow, paired with a killer, clattering faux-Neptunes beat courtesy of Jazze Pha, the kid, the self-proclaimed “Mr. 106 and Park,” was unstoppable."

== Chart performance ==
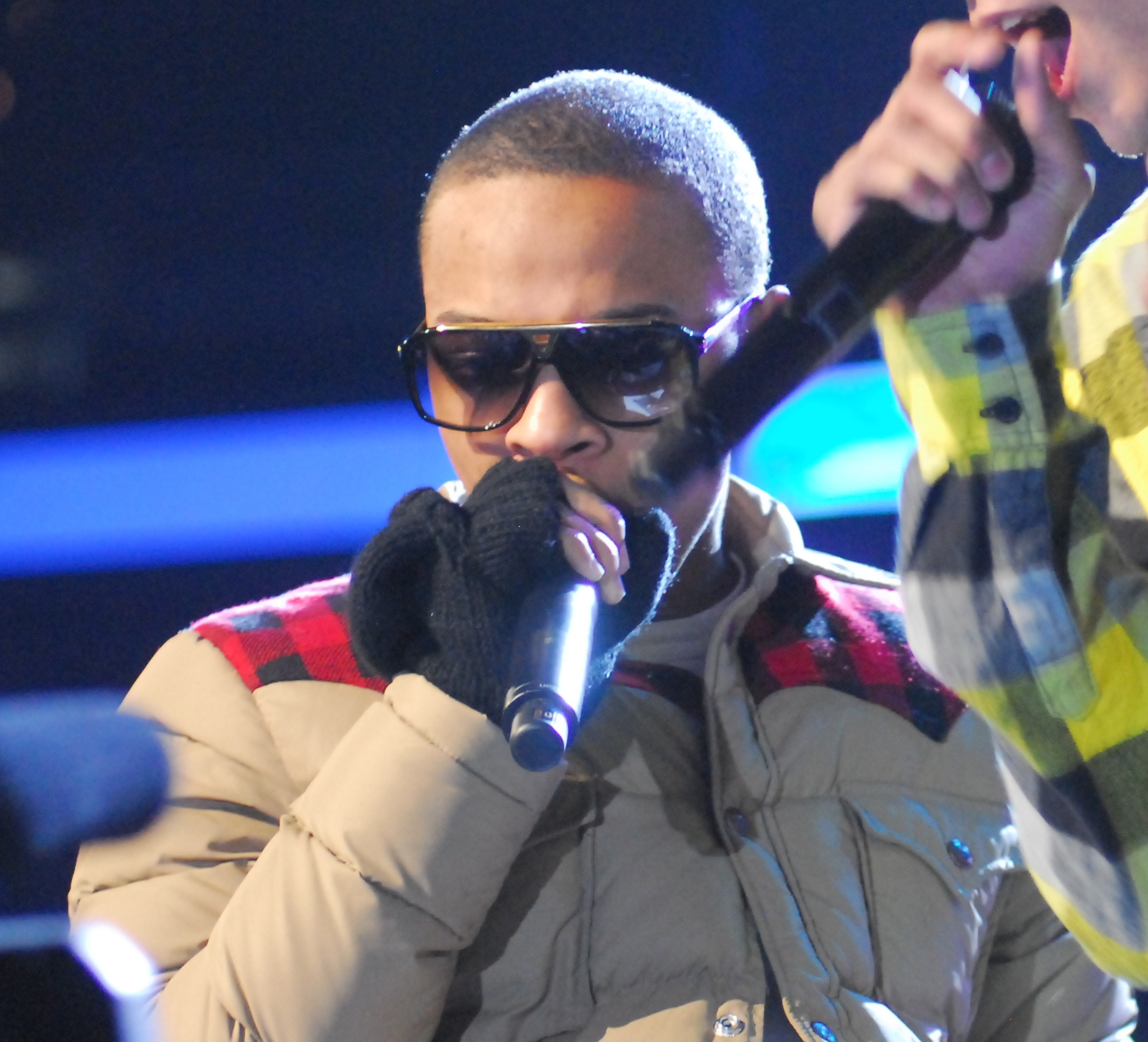
"Let's Get Down" gave Bow Wow his third top 20 hit on the Billboard Hot 100.

"Let's Get Down" debuted at number 90 on the Billboard Hot 100 for the week of July 5, 2003. Six weeks later, it entered the top 40 at number 30 for the week of August 16, 2003. It peaked at number 14 for the week of September 20, 2003 and was present on the chart for a total of seventeen weeks. This gave Bow Wow his third top 20 hit and highest charting single on that chart until 2005's "Like You" featuring Ciara and "Let Me Hold You" featuring Omarion. The song was also Birdman's fourth top 40 hit on that chart (his third as a featured artist). It peaked at number 12 on the Hot R&B/Hip-Hop Songs chart, number 6 on the Hot Rap Songs chart and number 8 on the Rhythmic Top 40 chart. The song charted in Australia, debuting at number 50 for the week of October 27, 2003 before leaving the next week.

== Music video ==
Directed by Bryan Barber, the video takes place at the Atlanta DMV where Bow Wow is getting ready for his driver's test. Birdman plays his driving instructor and gives him tasks that need to be completed. Intercut are scenes of Bow Wow attracting the attention of various women. It ends with Bow Wow getting his picture taken for his driver's license. Jazze Pha makes a cameo appearance. The video made its premiere on June 30, 2003.

In an interview with MTV, Bow Wow explained how the video relates getting a driver's license to being able to attract women: "The concept of the video is that I go to the DMV to get my license. I get in the car and Baby’s my instructor. We’re in Atlanta taking a tour [and] Baby is like, ‘Bow, pull over. Tell this to shorty.’ He tests me on my speaking game with the ladies. A normal DMV person would be testing you on your right turn, [saying] ‘check your mirrors.’ Me, I was tested on did I spit game to the girl correctly."

== Formats and track listing ==
Europe CD

1. "Let's Get Down" (Album Version) – 4:41

US 12"

1. "Let's Get Down" (Album) – 4:21
2. "Let's Get Down" (Instr.) – 4:20
3. "Take Ya Home" (Album) – 3:59
4. "Let's Get Down" (Acapella) – 4:15

US 12" maxi-single

1. "Follow Me" (Album Version) – 3:53
2. "Follow Me" (Instrumental) – 3:52
3. "Follow Me" (A Capella) – 3:47
4. "Let's Get Down" (Album Version) – 4:29
5. "Let's Get Down" (Instrumental) – 4:35
6. "Let's Get Down" (A Capella) – 4:30

US CD

1. "Let's Get Down" (Album) – 4:21
2. "Let's Get Down" (Instru.) – 4:20

US digital download

1. "Let's Get Down" (feat. Baby) – 4:21

== Credits and personnel ==
Credits adapted from the liner notes of Unleashed.

Recording

- Recorded and mixed at PatchWerk Studios, Atlanta, GA

Personnel

- Jazze Pha – producer
- Jermaine Dupri - producer
- Josh Butler – recording engineer
- Steve Fisher – recording engineer, assistant mix engineer
- Cory Williams – assistant recording engineer
- Leslie Brathwaite – mix engineer
- Charles Pettaway – guitar
- Tameka "Tiny" Cottle – background vocals
- Rahman "Rocky" Griffin – vocal arrangements

== Charts ==
=== Weekly charts ===
Chart (2003)	Peak position
Australia (ARIA)	50
Australian Urban (ARIA)	14
Netherlands (Single Top 100)	97
UK Singles (OCC)	93
UK Hip Hop/R&B (OCC)	27
US Billboard Hot 100	14
US Hot R&B/Hip-Hop Songs (Billboard)	12
US Hot Rap Songs (Billboard)	6
US Rhythmic Airplay (Billboard)	8

=== Year-end charts ===
Chart (2003)	Position
US Hot R&B/Hip-Hop Songs (Billboard)	61
