= My Baby (Bow Wow song) =

Single by Bow Wow featuring Jagged Edge

from the album Unleashed
- Released: July 22, 2003
- Recorded: 2002
- Genre: Hip-hop; R&B
- Length: 4:47
- Label: Columbia
- Songwriters: Shad Moss; Johntá Austin; Ryan Bowser; Antoine "BAM" Macon; Rahman Griffin
- Producers: Ryan Bowser; Antoine "BAM" Macon

Bow Wow singles chronology
"Let's Get Down" (2003)	"My Baby" (2003)	"Baby It's You" (2004)

Jagged Edge singles chronology
"Walked Outta Heaven" (2003)	"My Baby" (2003)	"What's It Like" (2004)

My Baby is the second single of rapper Bow Wow's third studio album Unleashed (2003), featuring guest vocals by R&B group Jagged Edge. The song is about how he meets a girl, that is in an abusive relationship.

The music video features actress Davetta Sherwood and two storylines. It ends with the caption: 'Make the right choice', a message to those who are in an abusive relationship.

== Music video ==
In the video, a girl called Kim (played by Sherwood) sits frustrated on the stairs and cries. Bow Wow notices her and tries to make her laugh. Before he left he gave her his phone number. Later he calls her and they start a conversation, but Kim's abusive and drunk ex-boyfriend knocks on the door.

At this point, the screen splits in two: The right side shows the storyline, where Kim hangs up the phone and let her ex-boyfriend enter, who puts her in his car and drive away. While the driving, they dispute and soon they got into a deadly car accident, where they both died.

The left side shows where Kim didn't hang up the phone, but leaves her ex outside and then walks away. She then continued her conversation with Bow Wow. Some days later, Bow Wow and Kim are sitting on a park bench and kiss. At the end both are sitting together on the stairs, where Kim (at the start of this video) sat and cried.

The music video also features a short part of Bow Wow's song "The Don, The Dutch", a track that also appeared on his album Unleashed.

== Charts ==
=== Weekly charts ===
Chart (2003–04)	Peak position
US Billboard Hot 100	42
US Hot R&B/Hip-Hop Songs (Billboard)	17
US Hot Rap Songs (Billboard)	15
US Rhythmic Airplay (Billboard)	24

=== Year-end charts ===
Chart (2004)	Position
US Hot R&B/Hip-Hop Songs (Billboard)	100
