= Boiling Pot =

- Film poster
- Directed by: Omar Ashmawey
- Written by: Ibrahim Ashmawey; Omar Ashmawey
- Starring: Louis Gossett Jr. Keith David; M. Emmet Walsh; Danielle Fishel; Davetta Sherwood; John Heard; Ibrahim Ashmawey; Ashley Lynn Switzer
- Distributed by: Indican Pictures
- Release date: September 29, 2015
- Country: United States
- Language: English

Boiling Pot is a 2015 American drama film directed by Omar Ashmawey and starring Louis Gossett Jr., Danielle Fishel, and Keith David.

== Premise ==
On an American college campus, ideas that have been long neglected emerge as racial tension grows between different student groups.

== Cast ==
- Louis Gossett Jr. as Detective Haven
- Danielle Fishel as Valerie Davis
- Keith David as Agent Long
- M. Emmet Walsh as Dean Marrison
- Davetta Sherwood as Rose Torrance
- John Heard as Tom Davis
- Ibrahim Ashmawey as Hazem Seif
- Ashley Lynn Switzer as Claire Davis
- Sayed Badreya as Anwar Seif
- Corrin Evans as Lauren Davis
- Kasey St. John as Kasey
