= Unleashed (Bow Wow album) =

Studio album by Bow Wow
- Released: August 19, 2003
- Recorded: 2002–03
- Genre: Hip hop
- Length: 54:21
- Label: Columbia
- Producers: Bow Wow; Teresa Caldwell; Bink!; The Neptunes; Jazze Pha; Swizz Beatz; Lil Jon

Bow Wow chronology
Doggy Bag (2001)	Unleashed (2003)	Wanted (2005)

Singles from Unleashed
- 1. "Let's Get Down" Released: June 24, 2003; 2. "My Baby" Released: July 22, 2003

Unleashed is the third studio album by American rapper Bow Wow. It was released on August 19, 2003, by Columbia Records. Recording sessions for the album took place from 2002 to 2003. The album features guest appearances from Amerie, Baby, Mario and Jagged Edge, with its production handled by Bink!, The Neptunes, Jazze Pha, Swizz Beatz and Lil Jon, among others. It is Bow Wow's only album without assistance or production from his mentor Jermaine Dupri, and the first album where he dropped the 'Lil' from his stage name after his film debut in Like Mike (2002).

Unleashed was supported by two singles: "Let's Get Down" and "My Baby". It received mixed reviews from critics, who felt that despite the changes in flow, production and lyrics, Bow Wow didn't distinguish himself enough to stand out from other rappers. Despite the mixed critical reception it was a commercial success, debuting at number three on the Billboard 200 and selling 120,000 copies in its first week. The album was certified gold by the Recording Industry Association of America (RIAA) in September 2003. As of July 2004, Unleashed has sold over 774,000 copies in the U.S. alone.

== Background ==
Following the release of his sophomore album Doggy Bag (2001), Lil' Bow Wow achieved minor success on the Top R&B Singles charts, with "Thank You" and "Take Ya Home". In 2002, after finishing production on his debut film Like Mike and releasing his cover of "Basketball" for the film's soundtrack, Bow Wow chose to drop the "Lil" from his name completely and continue his career simply as Bow Wow. In an interview with MTV, he said that he wanted to distinguish himself from the other rappers, who had the word in their moniker:

"All these Lil’ rappers, I’m just kind of getting real irritated by it. I said, 'You know what? Drop the Lil'. Forget it. I’m Bow Wow.' Besides, I’m growing up, I’m not little anymore. [I just decided] two weeks ago. I really got irritable. It’s all these Lil’ cats, forget it. I’m Bow Wow now. Everything is just 'Bow Wow,' no 'Lil' Bow Wow.'"

In an interview with Billboard, he spoke about the album's content, saying that he wanted his fans to follow him on the journey that he has started three years ago with a new sound and different lyrical content that defines his growing maturity.

== Music and lyrics ==
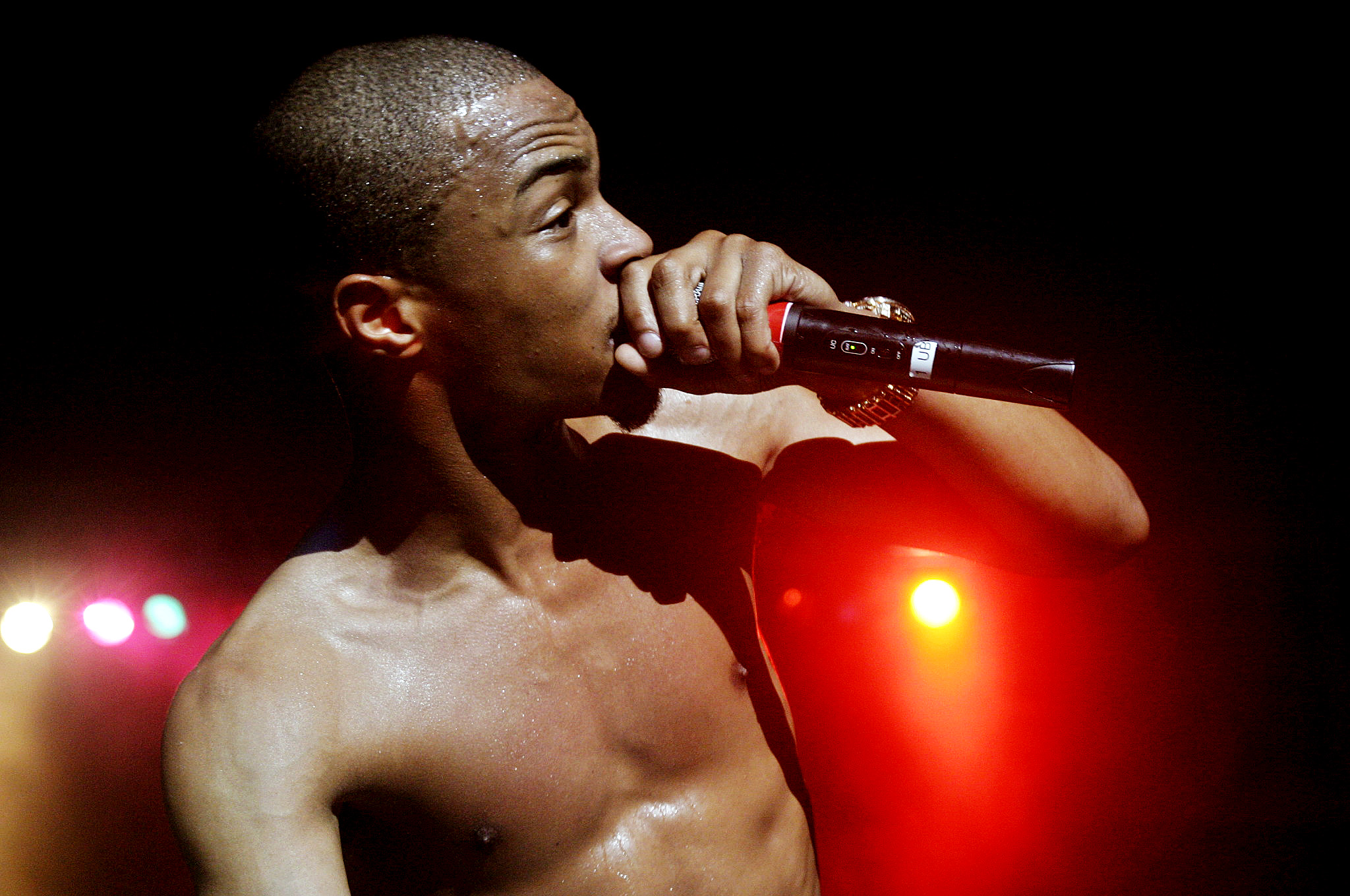
T.I. had a ghostwriting credit on the album.

The lead single, titled "Let's Get Down", which was co-written by a then unknown, Clifford Harris (aka T.I.). Bow Wow talked with Billboard on wanting to make an impact, after changing his name and wanting to work with rapper Baby, saying that he was looking for a single that would grab people's attention and that Baby's inclusion almost didn't happen but then changed his mind to work with him on the song. In September 2003, in an interview with website Whudat, T.I. talked about his contribution to Bow Wow's third album and the song itself:

"Yeah this time around I wrote some songs for him. Even on the single, 'Let's Get Down'. I wrote the third verse and the hook. Usually how we did it was [Jazze Pha] he'll write one verse, Bow Wow would write one verse, his homeboy Rocka would write one, and I'd write a verse and come up with the hook."

In 2009, in an interview with HipHopDX, Bow Wow commented on how getting T.I. to ghostwrite for him on his third album didn't tarnish his credibility as a rapper, saying that he learned about the songwriting process by contributing about 85 percent to the album while T.I. wrote a full song and a couple verses to a few tracks.

"Eighteen", which was produced by Lil Jon, is described as a coming-of-age song, where Bow Wow is proclaiming some things that he wants to do when he reaches that milestone age. "My Baby" is an emotional song that has him comforting a friend dealing with a broken heart. Bow Wow described on this Neptunes-produced track "The Don, The Dutch" as "the '2Pac record'" that'll surprise listeners not expecting it. Another Neptunes track "I'll Move On", has him asking his fans to let him grow up into adulthood and not overthink the decisions he makes as he progresses.

== Critical reception ==
Professional ratings
Review scores
Source	Rating
AllMusic	2.5/5 stars
New York Post	2.5/4 stars
RapReviews	7.5/10
Rolling Stone	2/5 stars
USA Today	2/4 stars
Vibe	3/5 stars

The album received generally mixed reviews from music critics who appreciated the maturity in the production and lyrics but felt that Bow Wow had not yet found a defining style. Steve 'Flash' Juon of RapReviews praised the album for being consistent with its beats and Bow Wow for changing his lyrical tone saying, "By maturing his musical sound along with his voice, he successfully sheds the "Lil" image for good and makes an effective play for establishing his longevity in the business." Donnie Kwak of Vibe said that Bow Wow manages to by past formulas with his mature flow and display his sensitive side on "I'll Move On" concluding that, "Because he's willing to embrace his growing pains, Bow Wow's future is promising." Jason Birchmeier of AllMusic commented on how the album manages to straddle the line between Bow Wow's previous pop rap material and his new mature hip hop image. Despite changing his flow and lyrics and experimenting with new beats, People felt that Bow Wow "has yet to really develop his own style and sometimes regresses to playing to the kiddie crowd."

== Commercial performance ==
Unleashed debuted at number three on the US Billboard 200 chart, selling 120,000 copies in its first week and marking Bow Wow's second US top-ten debut. On September 25, 2003, the album was certified gold by the Recording Industry Association of America (RIAA) for shipments of over 500,000 copies. As of July 2004, the album has sold 774,000 copies in the United States, according to Nielsen Soundscan.

== Track listing ==
No.	Title	Writer(s)	Producer(s)	Length
1.	"Get It Poppin'"	Kasseem Dean; Rahman "R.O.C." Griffin	Swizz Beatz	3:28
2.	"Let's Get Down" (featuring Baby)	Shad Moss; Phalon Alexander; Griffin; Clifford Harris, Jr.	Jazze Pha	4:11
3.	"Eighteen"	Moss; Griffin; Harris, Jr.; James Phillips; Jonathan Smith	Lil Jon	4:50
4.	"Follow Me"	Moss; Griffin; Roosevelt Harrell	Bink!	3:53
5.	"My Baby" (featuring Jagged Edge)	Moss; Johntá Austin; Ryan Bowser; Griffin; Antoine "Bam" Macon	Bam; Bowser	5:03
6.	"The Don, the Dutch"	Moss; Griffin; Pharrell Williams	The Neptunes	3:57
7.	"The Movement"	Moss; Griffin; Williams	The Neptunes	3:56
8.	"I Can't Lose"	Moss; Alexander; Griffin	Jazze Pha	4:02
9.	"Hey Little Momma" (featuring Jagged Edge)	Moss; Alexander; Brian Casey; Harris, Jr.	Jazze Pha	3:38
10.	"I Got Ya'll"	Moss; Bowser; Harris, Jr.; Macon	Bam; Bowser	3:17
11.	"I'll Move On" (featuring Mario)	Griffin; Harris, Jr.; Williams	The Neptunes	4:06
12.	"To My Mama" (featuring Amerie)	Moss; Tenaia Sanders; Smith	Lil Jon	5:17
13.	"I'm Back" (bonus track)	Moss; Lenton Hutton	L.T. Hutton	3:48

== Personnel ==
- Credits for Unleashed adapted from AllMusic.

- Shilla Benning – groomer, stylist
- Bow Wow – executive producer
- Leslie Braithwaite – mixing engineer
- Josh Butler – engineer, mixing engineer
- Teresa Caldwell – executive producer, groomer, stylist
- Frank Carbonari – graphic design
- Andrew Coleman – engineer
- Tameka Cottle – background vocals
- Kevin "KD" Davis – mixing, mixing engineer
- Derek Delay – engineer
- Kris Feldman – art direction, design
- Steve Fisher – assistant engineer, engineer, mixing engineer
- John Frye – engineer, mixing
- Ken Duro Ifill – mixing, mixing engineer
- Toya McKinney – background vocals
- Charles Pettaway – guitar
- Je Robicheaux – assistant engineer
- Shontelle Sampeur – hair stylist
- Brian Stanley – engineer
- Sacha Waldman – photography
- Cory Williams – assistant engineer
- Mike "Hitman" Wilson – producer

== Charts ==
=== Weekly charts ===
Weekly chart performance for Unleashed
Chart (2003)	Peak position
US Billboard 200	3
US Top R&B/Hip-Hop Albums (Billboard)	3

=== Year-end charts ===
Year-end chart performance for Unleashed
Chart (2003)	Position
US Billboard 200	173
US Top R&B/Hip-Hop Albums (Billboard)	87

== Certifications ==
Region	Certification	Certified units/sales
United States (RIAA)	Gold	500,000^{^}
^{^} Shipments figures based on certification alone.
