= Lover Girl (Lady Saw album) =

Studio album by Lady Saw
- Released: 1994
- Studios: Mixing Lab Studios, Main Street Studios
- Genres: Dancehall, reggae
- Label: VP
- Producers: Garfield "Sampallie" Phillips and Richard "Rich Kid" Hare (tracks 1–3, 5, 6, 8, 9, 10 and 12), John John (tracks 4 and 11), Patrick Roberts (track 7)

Lady Saw chronology
Lover Girl (1994)	Give Me the Reason (1996)

Professional ratings
Review scores
Source	Rating
AllMusic	3/5 stars

Lover Girl is the first studio album by the dancehall artist Lady Saw, released in 1994.

== Track listing ==
1. Man in My Life
2. To Sir with Love
3. Love Is What We Want
4. Baby Face
5. We Need Love
6. Find a Good Man
7. Hardcore
8. Heads of Government
9. Wife and Sweetheart
10. Bare as You Dare
11. Welding Torch
12. Bad Rooster
13. Bad Inna Bed
14. Stab Out the Meat [Remix]
15. Informer
16. Can't Run Competition
