= See Spot Run =

2001 film by John Whitesell

- Theatrical release poster
- Directed by: John Whitesell
- Screenplay by: George Gallo; Gregory Poirier; Dan Baron; Chris Faber
- Adaptation by: Stuart Gibbs; Craig Titley
- Story by: Andrew Deane; Michael Alexander Miller; George Gallo
- Produced by: Andrew Deane; Tracey Trench; Robert Simonds
- Starring: David Arquette; Michael Clarke Duncan; Leslie Bibb; Joe Viterelli; Angus Jones; Anthony Anderson; Paul Sorvino
- Cinematography: John S. Bartley
- Edited by: Cara Silverman
- Music by: John Debney
- Production companies: Village Roadshow Pictures; NPV Entertainment; Robert Simonds Productions
- Distributed by: Warner Bros. Pictures
- Release date: March 2, 2001
- Running time: 97 minutes
- Country: United States
- Language: English
- Budget: $16 million
- Box office: $43 million

See Spot Run is a 2001 American comedy film directed by John Whitesell and starring David Arquette, Michael Clarke Duncan, Leslie Bibb, Joe Viterelli, Angus Jones, Anthony Anderson, Steve Schirripa, and Paul Sorvino. It is about a mailman who takes in a stray bullmastiff, the titular Spot, only to discover he is a trained FBI dog who escaped from a witness protection program and is targeted for attacking a crime boss.

See Spot Run was released by Warner Bros. Pictures on March 2, 2001. It received mostly negative reviews but was a moderate box office success, grossing $43 million against a $16 million budget.

== Plot ==
Bullmastiff Agent 11 works in the FBI canine unit in Seattle, Washington. With his human partner, Murdoch, Agent 11 goes on a raid of the hideout of Mafia boss Sonny Talia, who escapes but not before the dog bites off one of his testicles. After having it surgically replaced in hospital, Sonny orders his two bodyguards, Gino and Arliss, to kill Agent 11; the FBI become aware of the hit on Agent 11 and have him sent to a training facility in Alaska for protection.

Agent 11 escapes an assassination attempt by Gino and Arliss and hides in the truck of mail carrier Gordon Smith, who dislikes dogs and has volunteered to look after James McGuire, the young son of his neighbor, Stephanie, who has had to leave town on a business trip. James is not happy at having to stay with Gordon, but discovers Agent 11 hiding in his truck and mistakenly believes it to be Gordon's dog. Gordon considers getting rid of the dog but relents after seeing the effect he has on James, who names him "Spot." Agent 11 does not initially catch balls or Frisbees as he was not taught how to play as a puppy, but eventually learns to do so with Gordon and James and begins acting like a normal dog. Meanwhile, Stephanie's flight is cancelled and she is forced to come back home.

After Gino and Arliss make an unsuccessful attempt to kill Agent 11 in a pet store, the FBI find out that he is living with Gordon and retrieve him. However, the dog misses his life with Gordon and James. Gino and Arliss track down Gordon to his house and, believing to find the dog there, inform Sonny, who accompanies them, wanting to finish him off himself. Seeing Sonny mobilize, the FBI rush to Gordon's house, with Agent 11 part of the unit. They reach his house in time for Agent 11 to subdue Sonny, who is arrested.

Murdoch decides to let the dog choose with whom he wants to live; he chooses Gordon and James, and gives Murdoch a goodbye lick. Stephanie returns home and, seeing her house wrecked, is angry with Gordon, but James convinces her that Gordon is a good guy. Sonny is incarcerated and the dog, now known only as Spot, continues living a happy life with Gordon, Stephanie and James.

== Cast ==
- David Arquette as Gordon Smith
- Angus T. Jones as James McGuire
- Michael Clarke Duncan as Murdoch
- Paul Sorvino as Sonny Talia
- Leslie Bibb as Stephanie McGuire
- Anthony Anderson as Benny Washington
- Sarah-Jane Redmond as Agent Sharp
- Joe Viterelli as Gino Vacco
- Francisco Gattorno as Rodrigo
- Steve Schirripa as Arliss Donato
- César Évora as Gabriel
- Kavan Smith as Ricky
- Kim Hawthorne as Cassavettes

== Production ==
See Spot Run was entirely shot in Vancouver, British Columbia, Canada from June 12 to August 7, 2000.

== Reception ==
The film received negative reviews. Review aggregator Rotten Tomatoes reports a score of 24% based on 76 reviews, with an average rating of 3.9/10. The site's consensus states that it "has all the elements children enjoy in a movie: a lovable dog, bad things happening to stupid adults, and lots of dog poop. For adults, it's either hit-or-miss". On Metacritic, the film holds a weighted average score of 24 out of 100 based on 23 critics, indicating "generally unfavorable reviews". Audiences polled by CinemaScore gave the film an average grade of "A-" on an A+ to F scale.

Roger Ebert of The Chicago Sun-Times gave the film 1 1/2 out of 4 stars, saying the relentless scatological jokes represented "some kind of desperate downward trend in American taste" but he did offer praise for Michael Clarke Duncan's performance as a redeeming element.

Nell Minow of Common Sense Media was concerned about the movie's excessive use of adult humor in a PG rated movie as described "Too dumb and too vulgar for anyone".

== Home media ==
See Spot Run was released on VHS and DVD by Warner Home Video on August 28, 2001.

== Soundtrack ==
1. "Atomic Dog" - George Clinton
2. "Can't Smile Without You" - Barry Manilow
3. "Bust a Move" - Young MC
4. "Dog" - Milo Z
5. "At Last" - Etta James
6. "Mr. Sandman" - The Chordettes
7. "Hampster Dance" - Hampton the Hampster
8. "For Once in My Life" - Stevie Wonder
9. "As Long as You're Loving Me" - Vitamin C

== Box office ==
The film opened at #3 at the North American box office making $9.7 million USD in its opening weekend, behind Hannibal and The Mexican, the latter of which opened at the top spot. Despite this, it was a success and went on to gross over $43 million worldwide, in part because the film featured the first trailer for the already-heavily anticipated Harry Potter and the Sorcerer's Stone.
