= Cherry Alive =

Studio album by Eve's Plum
- Released: September 19, 1995
- Recorded: 1994–1995
- Genre: Alternative rock, power pop, pop-punk
- Length: 42:33
- Label: 550
- Producer: Fred Maher

Eve's Plum chronology
Envy (1993)	Cherry Alive (1995)

Professional ratings
Review scores
Source	Rating
AllMusic	4/5 stars

Cherry Alive is the second and final studio album by American alternative rock band Eve's Plum. It was released in 1995 on 550 Records. It is the band's only studio album with bassist Theo Mack, who replaced original bassist Chris Giammalvo, who played bass on the band's previous studio album Envy (1993), having left the band the year prior.

The album's first single, "Jesus Loves You (Not As Much As I Do)", failed to gain interest from mainstream radio and the album failed to chart when it was released. The second single, "Wishing the Day Away", was released to radio without a music video to accompany it and failed to chart as well. The third and final single, the album's title track, gained some airplay on college radio, but still failed to chart. Sony/550 dropped the band, who split three years later.

== Production ==
Cherry Alive was recorded in New York City, in the same building that housed Studio 54.

== Critical reception ==
Trouser Press wrote that the band "drops the corrosive angst on the lean and less mean Cherry Alive, opting instead for clean pop songwriting and svelte rock guitars. Fred Maher’s production brings out the cream in Fitzpatrick’s voice." Billboard praised "Wishing the Day Away", writing that Fitzpatrick's "Blondie-like vocals come alive, seducing listeners with their breezy, sweet melody."

== Track listing ==
All lyrics and music by Eve's Plum.

1. "Jesus Loves You (Not As Much As I Do)"
2. "Wishing the Day Away"
3. "Want You Bad"
4. "Loved By You"
5. "Fairy Princess"
6. "Cherry Alive"
7. "Lipstuck"
8. "Sticky and Greasy"
9. "Beautiful"
10. "Serious Stuff"
11. "Dog in My Heart"
12. "Only Anger"

== Personnel ==
- Eve's Plum (main performer)
  - Colleen Fitzpatrick (vocals)
  - Michael Kotch (guitar)
  - Ben Kotch (drums)
  - Theo Mack (bass)
- Fred Maher (producer)
- Lloyd Puckitt (engineer)
- Sara Rotman (art direction)
- Sara Rotman (design)
- Victoria Clamp (background vocals)
- Michael McLaughlin (photography)
