= Passion (Lady Saw album) =

Studio album by Lady Saw
- Released: June 12, 1997
- Genre: Dancehall, reggae
- Length: 59:19
- Label: VP

Lady Saw chronology
Give Me the Reason (1996)	Passion (1997)	Raw, the Best of Lady Saw (1998)

Professional ratings
Review scores
Source	Rating
Allmusic	link

Passion is the third studio album by Jamaican singer Lady Saw, released on June 12, 1997, by VP Records.

== Track listing ==
1. "Stone Love - Introlude / Gal No Worry"
2. "Love Is Strange" (featuring Shaggy)
3. "Gal No Worry"
4. "The Work"
5. "Na Nurse"
6. "Healing" (with Beenie Man)
7. "I Don't Need To Know"
8. "Lover Boy"
9. "Wuk With You"
10. "Sycamore Tree"
11. "Call Me"
12. "Long Till It Bend" (featuring Merciless)
13. "Let Peace Reign"
14. "Passion"
15. "Woman Mi Name"

== Charts ==
Chart (1997)	Peak position
U.S. Billboard Top Reggae Albums	8
