= Walk Out =

Studio album by Lady Saw
- Released: April 17, 2007
- Genre: Reggae
- Label: VP

Lady Saw chronology
Strip Tease (2004)	Walk Out (2007)	My Way (2010)

Walk Out is the sixth studio album by Jamaican singer Lady Saw, released on April 17, 2007 by VP Records

== Composition ==
Some of the songs were classified as more "vulnerable" and less explicit than her previous work. In "No Less Than a Woman (Infertility)", Saw discusses her personal experiences with infertility. "Not the World's Prettiest" has been classified as "lilting R&B" and criticized Western conceptions of beauty; its theme was compared favorably to "Unpretty" by TLC.

== Reception ==
=== Critical ===
Professional ratings
Review scores
Source	Rating
Allmusic	4/5 stars

On the review aggregate site Album of the Year, Walk Out holds a score of 80 out of 100. Allmusic awarded the album four stars out of five; a review for the outlet, written by David Jeffries, likened it to Prince's early releases and deemed it "an exciting mix of shocking, intoxicating, daring, and sure." Writing for the Lincoln Journal Star, Brett Johnson regarded the album as evidence that Saw "endures not only because of her sharp tongue but her big heart." In the July 2007 issue of Vibe, as part of a feature on a reggae recording studio, the album was highlighted as being in "Heavy Rotation".

=== Commercial ===
The album became Saw's fourth entry on the Billboard Reggae Albums chart, on which it peaked at number eight.

== Track listing ==
1. Hello Lady Saw
2. Big up
3. Me and My Crew (The RAE)
4. Silly Dreams
5. No Less Than A Woman (Infertility)
6. Not World's Prettiest
7. You Need Me
8. Baby Dry Your Eyes
9. Walk Out
10. Chat To Mi Back
11. It's Like That
12. Power of the Pum
13. Like it
14. Stray Dog

== Charts ==
Chart (2007)	Peak position
US Top Reggae Albums (Billboard)	8
