= My Way (Lady Saw album) =

Studio album by Lady Saw
- Released: September 7, 2010
- Recorded: 2007–2010
- Genre: Reggae, dancehall
- Length: 54:37
- Label: Toasting Music / Varèse Fontana / Varèse Sarabande
- Producer: Steve Corn (exec.), Frank Linwall (exec.), Steven Weber (exec.), Camar Doyles, Windell Edwards, James Goring, Tony Kelly, Jammy Ricardo James, Lloyd James, Lydon Lettman, Wayne Thompson

Lady Saw chronology
Walk Out (2007)	My Way (2010)	Alter Ego (2014)

My Way is the seventh studio album by Jamaican singer Lady Saw, released on September 7, 2010, by Toasting Music, Varèse Fontana and Varèse Sarabande. The album featured guest artists such as Eve, Camar Doyles, & Ding Dong. A duet with Ali Campbell on "I Do Love You" was recorded for the album, but not included on the final track listing.

== Reception ==
AllMusic gave the album 4/5 stars and a positive review:

"My Way is the rock solid proof [that she is still relevant] as Saw offers a dizzying mix of hard sex and girl power over backing tracks that run the gamut. Anyone familiar with reggae singer Gyptian’s mega-hit “Hold You” will recognize the chilled riddim underneath Saw’s great answer song “Me Hold You,” but if you want furious, jump to the wild highlight “Tighta” which utilizes the over-the-top “Cosa Nostra” riddim for controlled chaos" "While the X-rated elements of My Way can’t be oversold, it is important to note that the versatile Saw is able to adjust from porno to political to personal like Prince in his early days. Highly recommended, just have your ID ready"

— AllMusic

Reggae Vibes fans gave the album a rating of "Very Good", with the accompanying review by the website stating:

"Produced with the intention to reach a wider audience, it's obvious that this brand new 15 track album has to be something of a mixed bag. And indeed it is, both musically and lyrically spoken. Of course, she remains true to her sexually empowering, cheeky lyricism on tracks such as "Tighta", "Muscle Control", "Me Hold Yuh" and "5 Minutes", but it's just not as over the top as we are used to." "The songstress, deejay, producer and writer makes clear that she's still the "Queen of Dancehall", but she also shows that the hardcore style that brought her fame isn't the only thing she's relying on in these days."

— Reggae Vibes

== Singles ==
Several singles were taken from the album. The first, "Party 'Til December", was released on August 10, 2010.

== Track listing ==
No.	Title	Length
1.	"Everyway Mi Go"	3:35
2.	"Your Chick"	2:59
3.	"Bigger Than"	3:13
4.	"He Is At My House" (ft. Eve)	3:19
5.	"My Way"	4:58
6.	"Party 'Til December"	3:20
7.	"Tighta"	3:41
8.	"Cyaan Get Me"	3:47
9.	"Crazy Love"	4:43
10.	"Me Hold Yoh"	2:53
11.	"Muscle Control" (ft. Camar Doyles)	3:32
12.	"5 Minutes"	3:11
13.	"Facebook"	3:12
14.	"I Can't Wait" (ft. Ding Dong)	3:40
15.	"I'm A Woman"	4:34
Total length:		54:37
