= Lover Girl =

Lover Girl may refer to:

- Lover Girl (Lady Saw album), 1994
- Lover Girl (Lexi Jayde album), 2026
- "Lover Girl" (Laufey song), 2025
- "Lover Girl" (Megan Thee Stallion song), 2025
- "Lover Girl", a song by Alisha Chinai from her album Made in India (1995)

== See also ==
- "Lovergirl", a 1984 song by Teena Marie
- "Lovergirl", a 2016 song by Rhea Litré
- "Lovergirl", a 2023 song by Piri & Tommy
