= Give Me the Reason (Lady Saw album) =

Studio album by Lady Saw
- Released: April 11, 1996
- Genre: Dancehall, reggae
- Label: VP

Lady Saw chronology
| Lover Girl (1994) | Give Me the Reason (1996) | Passion (1997) |

Give Me the Reason is the second album by the Jamaican singer Lady Saw, released in 1996. The album was noted for its sexually explicit lyrics. The title track incorporates elements of country music.

== Critical reception ==
Professional ratings
Review scores
| Source | Rating |
|---|---|
| AllMusic | 3/5 stars |

Vibe, in 2004, deemed the title track a "classic" and a "sweet" slow jam. Spin, in 2007, listed the album as a "Dancehall Essential", writing that Lady Saw is "a cross between a porn star and a feminist scholar."

== Track listing ==
1. Good Wuk
2. What Is Slackness
3. Give Me the Reason
4. Darnest Things
5. Husband of Mine
6. Glory Be to God
7. Saturday Night at the Movies
8. Name Nuh Stand fi Sex
9. Condom
10. Lonely Without You
11. Life Without Dick
12. Love & Understanding
13. Ain't No Meaning
14. Over & Over
