= Strip Tease (Lady Saw album) =

Studio album by Lady Saw
- Released: August 24, 2004
- Genre: Dancehall, reggae
- Length: 65:57
- Label: VP
- Producer: Christopher Chin (exec); Niel Amos; Donovan "Vendetta" Bennett; Christopher Birch; Eric "Jr" Delisser; Sly Dunbar; Jammy "Jam Two" James; Lloyd James; Trevor James; Dave Kelly; Richard Martin; Delano Thomas; Troyton

Lady Saw chronology
99 Ways (1998)	Strip Tease (2004)	Walk Out (2007)

Professional ratings
Review scores
Source	Rating
Allmusic	4/5 stars
Reggae Vibes	4/5 stars

Strip Tease is the fifth studio album by Jamaican singer Lady Saw, was released August 24, 2004 by VP label. It features tracks produced by Sly Dunbar and Mad House Producer Dave Kelly.

== Track listing ==
#	Title	Guest Performances	Time
1	"Intro"		0:32
2	"I've Got Your Man"		2:59
3	"Man A Di Least"		3:50
4	"Do Me Better"		2:52
5	"Move Your Body"	Voice Mail	3:30
6	"Strip Tease"		3:31
7	"Coming Over"		3:46
8	"Cocky Liquor (Skit)"		1:22
9	"Pretty Pussy"		2:53
10	"Loser"	Ce'Cile	3:22
11	"Lock It Up"		3:17
12	"Just Being Me"		3:28
13	"Best Pum Pum"		3:24
14	"Been So Long"		3:49
15	"Dreaming of You"		3:40
16	"Thug Loving"		3:33
17	"Good Love"	Sizzla	3:30
18	"Messed Up"		3:38
19	"My Dreamz"		4:53
20	"Dedicated to Mama"		4:08

== Charts ==
Chart (2004)	Peak position
U.S. Billboard Top R&B/Hip-Hop Albums	84
U.S. Billboard Top Reggae Albums	14
