= The Itch (Vitamin C song) =

2000 single by Vitamin C

Single by Vitamin C

from the album More
- B-side: "Graduation (Friends Forever)"
- Released: October 10, 2000
- Studio: 3:20, Standard Electrical Recorders, The Hit Factory (New York City)
- Length: 3:29
- Label: Elektra
- Songwriters: Colleen Fitzpatrick; Jimmy Harry; Billy Steinberg
- Producer: Jimmy Harry

Vitamin C singles chronology
"Graduation (Friends Forever)" (2000)	"The Itch" (2000)	"As Long As You're Loving Me" (2001)

"The Itch" a song by American pop singer Vitamin C, released as the first single from her second album, More (2001). Released on October 10, 2000, it peaked at number 45 on the US Billboard Hot 100 and number six in Australia, where it was certified platinum.

== Reception ==
The song failed to crack the top 40 on the US Billboard Hot 100 in 2001, peaking at number 45. It had moderate success by peaking on the Billboard Top 40 Mainstream chart at number 26. In Australia, "The Itch" reached number six on the ARIA Singles Chart and was certified platinum by the Australian Recording Industry Association (ARIA) for shipping 70,000 copies. It also peaked at number 34 in New Zealand on the RIANZ Singles Chart.

== Music video ==
Kirsten Dunst and Mila Kunis both appear in the video with Vitamin C. The video includes film clips from the movie Get Over It, which stars all three women, the song briefly appears during a phone call scene. The music video for the single was directed by Brothers Strause.

== Track listings ==
US and Canadian CD single

1. "The Itch" (original version)
2. "Graduation (Friends Forever)" (original version)

UK, European, and Australian CD single

1. "The Itch" (radio edit)
2. "The Itch" (original version)
3. "Graduation (Friends Forever)" (original version)
4. "The Itch" (DJ Scribbles Club Mix)

European maxi-CD single

1. "The Itch" (radio edit) – 3:14
2. "The Itch" (album version) – 3:29
3. "The Itch" (DJ Skribbles radio edit) – 3:13

== Credits and personnel ==
Credits are taken from the Canadian CD single liner notes.

Studios

- Recorded at 3:20 Studios, Standard Electrical Recorders, and the Hit Factory (New York City)
- Mixed at the Hit Factory (New York City)

Personnel

- Vitamin C – writing (as Colleen Fitzpatrick), vocals, background vocals
- Billy Steinberg – writing
- Jimmy Harry – writing, keyboards, production, arrangement, programming
- Alex Edenborough – background vocals
- Donna Deloray – background vocals
- Jennifer Karr – additional vocal production
- Brad Gilderman – mixing
- Flip Osman – mixing assistance
- Nena Brandan – mixing assistance

== Charts ==
=== Weekly charts ===
Chart (2000–2001)	Peak position
Australia (ARIA)	6
Canada (Nielsen SoundScan)	16
New Zealand (Recorded Music NZ)	34
US Billboard Hot 100	45
US Mainstream Top 40 (Billboard)	26

=== Year-end charts ===
Chart (2001)	Position
Australia (ARIA)	69
Canada (Nielsen SoundScan)	66

== Certifications ==
Region	Certification	Certified units/sales
Australia (ARIA)	Platinum	70,000^{^}
^{^} Shipments figures based on certification alone.
