= 99 Ways =

Studio album by Lady Saw
- Released: December 8, 1998
- Genre: Dancehall, reggae
- Length: 59:19
- Label: VP
- Producer: Lady Saw (exec Dave Kelly; Tony Kelly; Danny Browne; Richard Browne; Garfield Phillips; Paul Giscombe; Duke Reid

Lady Saw chronology
Raw, the Best of Lady Saw (1998)	99 Ways (1998)	Strip Tease (2004)

99 Ways is the fourth studio album by Jamaican singer Lady Saw, released on December 8, 1998 by VP Records. It was the second of two albums released in 1998 by the singer, the first being her greatest hits album, Raw, the Best of Lady Saw released 10 months prior.

== Track listing ==
No.	Title	Producer	Length
1.	"Straight Work"	Danny Browne	3:38
2.	"Oh Yeah"	Dave Kelly	2:26
3.	"No Matta Me"	Tony Kelly	3:09
4.	"Ride of Your Life" (Featuring Pancho Kryztal)	Tony Kelly	4:04
5.	"Woman Sneaking" (Featuring Red Rat)	Danny Browne	3:32
6.	"Picture on the Wall" (Featuring Sanchez)	Duke Reid	4:03
7.	"Nuh Dis Me"	Dave Kelly	3:00
8.	"Hardcore Lover" (Featuring T.O.K.)	Richard 'Shams' Browne	3:05
9.	"Money Money"	Tony Kelly	3:13
10.	"Don't Even Stress Dat"	Danny Browne	3:40
11.	"99 Ways"		3:06
12.	"Bunner Boy"	Paul 'Bankey' Giscombe	3:35
13.	"Brown Eyes Blue"		3:03
14.	"Hall of Fame"	Garfield 'Sampalue' Phillips	3:46
15.	"Let's Stay Together"		3:50
16.	"I Call Your Name"	Garfield 'Sampalue' Phillips	4:41
17.	"99 Ways" (live)		3:28

== Reception ==
The album reached no. 10 on Billboard's Top Reggae Albums chart.

== Charts ==
Chart (1999)	Peak position
U.S. Billboard Top Reggae Albums	10
