= Get Over It (film) =

2001 film by Tommy O'Haver

- Theatrical release poster
- Directed by: Tommy O'Haver
- Written by: R. Lee Fleming Jr.
- Produced by: Paul Feldsher; Michael Burns; Marc Butan
- Starring: Kirsten Dunst; Ben Foster; Melissa Sagemiller; Sisqó; Shane West; Colin Hanks; Swoosie Kurtz; Ed Begley Jr.; Martin Short
- Cinematography: Maryse Alberti
- Edited by: Jeff Betancourt
- Music by: Steve Bartek
- Production companies: Ignite Entertainment; Morpheus
- Distributed by: Miramax Films
- Release date: March 9, 2001
- Running time: 87 minutes
- Country: United States
- Language: English
- Budget: $22 million
- Box office: $19.9 million

Get Over It is a 2001 American teen romantic comedy film loosely based on William Shakespeare's A Midsummer Night's Dream about a high school senior who desperately tries to win back his ex-girlfriend by joining the school play she and her new boyfriend are performing in, against the advice of friends. The film was directed by Tommy O'Haver for Miramax Films and written by R. Lee Fleming Jr. The film was released on March 9, 2001, and stars Kirsten Dunst, Ben Foster, Melissa Sagemiller, Sisqó in his film debut, Shane West, and Colin Hanks. The film grossed $19.9 million against a budget of $22 million and received mixed reviews.

== Plot ==
After Berke Landers' girlfriend Allison breaks up with him, he tries to win her back by auditioning for the school play, despite having no theatrical talent. Meanwhile, his friends Felix and Dennis try to find him a new girlfriend.

With the help of Kelly, Felix's younger sister, who is in love with him, Berke wins a minor role in the play, a modern musical version of Shakespeare's comedy A Midsummer Night's Dream called A Midsummer Night's Rockin' Eve, written and directed by the school's overbearing drama teacher, Dr. Desmond Oates. When one of the leads, the school's star actor Peter Wong, is injured in a freak accident, Berke takes over Wong's role of Lysander. He gradually improves with continuing assistance from Kelly, unaware of their growing attraction.

At a party thrown by Felix at Berke's house, Kelly kisses Berke, but he insists that a relationship between them could not work as she is Felix's sister. At the same party, Berke and Allison catch her new boyfriend Bentley "Striker" Scrumfeld cheating on her with her best friend Maggie. Allison breaks up with Striker.

During the intermission on the play's opening night, Allison confides to Berke that she wants to get back together with him. Meanwhile, Striker bribes two of the theater technicians to try to blow Berke off the stage using stage pyrotechnics. Before the play resumes, Felix gives the orchestra sheet music for a love ballad written by Kelly to replace Oates' unpopular tune.

When the curtain rises, Kelly sings her song so beautifully that Berke finally realizes he loves her. He abandons his lines from the script and improvises his own verse professing his character's love for Kelly's character Helena. The audience applauds as Berke and Kelly kiss. Striker protests this change, but unwittingly signals the technicians to set off the explosion, blowing him offstage and into the orchestral section.

Dennis kisses Basin (Kelly's friend and his dancing partner), who kisses him back, suggesting that they also begin a relationship. Kelly and Berke leave the theater looking forward to their future together.

The film ends with Sisqó and Vitamin C singing and dancing along with the cast to the song "September" as the credits roll.

== Cast ==
- Kirsten Dunst as Kelly Woods
- Ben Foster as Berke Landers
- Melissa Sagemiller as Allison McAllister
- Sisqó as Dennis Wallace
- Shane West as Striker Scrumfeld
- Colin Hanks as Felix Woods
- Swoosie Kurtz as Beverly Landers
- Ed Begley Jr. as Frank Landers
- Zoe Saldaña as Maggie (credited as Zoë Saldana)
- Mila Kunis as Basin
- Carmen Electra as Mistress Moira
- Dov Tiefenbach as Little Steve
- Vitamin C as herself
- Kylie Bax as Dora Lynn
- Martin Short as Dr. Desmond Forrest Oates
- Tommy O'Haver as Love Matters Director
- Shawn Roberts as Colin

== Production ==
Kirsten Dunst was originally offered the role of Allison but chose to play Kelly because the character had more singing sequences. The late singer and actress Aaliyah was considered for the role of Maggie in the film, but the part was given to Zoe Saldana.

Get Over It was filmed in Ontario, Canada. Filming began on June 1, 2000, and ended on August 2, 2000, lasting 63 days. High school scenes were filmed at Port Credit Secondary School. Other locations in Ontario included Mississauga, Toronto and Port Credit.

== Release ==
The film was released in the US on March 9, 2001, by Miramax. The film then opened in the UK on June 10, 2001, by Momentum Pictures, and in Australia on September 6, 2001, by Buena Vista International.

=== Home media ===
The film was released on DVD and VHS in the US by Miramax Home Entertainment on August 14, 2001, and in the UK by Momentum Pictures on April 1, 2002. Special features include a commentary track with director Tommy O'Haver and screenwriter R. Lee Fleming Jr., deleted & extended scenes with optional commentary, and outtakes and a makeup test with Martin Short. Also included are the music videos "The Itch" by Vitamin C and an original song titled "Love Scud" by fictional boy band "The Swingtown Lads".

In 2010, Disney sold off Miramax, which they had owned since 1993, with private equity firm Filmyard Holdings taking over the company and its libraries in 2010. The film was re-released on DVD on May 15, 2012, by Echo Bridge Home Entertainment, as part of a home video sublicensing deal with Filmyard, and this release contains no special features or subtitle tracks. During March 2016, it was announced that Qatari company beIN Media Group had purchased Miramax from Filmyard Holdings. In April 2020, ViacomCBS (now known as Paramount Skydance) bought a 49% stake in Miramax from beIN, which gave them the rights to the Miramax catalog. They later made the film available on their subscription streaming service Paramount+, as well as on their free streaming service Pluto TV. On July 7, 2021, Paramount Home Entertainment reissued the film on DVD, with this being one of many Miramax titles that they reissued in 2020-21.

== Reception ==
=== Critical response ===
On review aggregation website Rotten Tomatoes, the film holds an approval rating of 41%, based on 58 reviews. As with most teen movies, Get Over It is entirely predictable, and there's not enough plot to sustain the length of the movie. However, it is not without its charms. Metacritic, which uses a weighted average, assigned the film a score of 52 out of 100, based on 14 critics, indicating "mixed or average" reviews.

Mick LaSalle of the San Francisco Chronicle gave the film a positive review and wrote it "breaks the formula for teen romances. Martin Short, as the vain and zany drama teacher, does not disappoint." A. O. Scott of The New York Times wrote though the film "may be halfhearted…it's not entirely without heart, most of it supplied by its adorable central couple, Kirsten Dunst and Ben Foster", as well as Short's comedy. He concluded Get Over It "is mild, harmless and occasionally affecting, possessing the fizz of diet soda and the sweet snap of slightly stale bubble gum." Eddie Cockrell of Variety magazine gave a mixed review, describing the film as "A mildly diverting, largely inoffensive teen laffer that's long on cartoonish high school hijinks but short on dramatic concentration and crucial story details."

Owen Gleiberman of Entertainment Weekly wrote, "O'Haver, whose first film was the 1998 gay indie mini-hit Billy's Hollywood Screen Kiss, relishes the whooshing extravagance of top 40 camp that crests into ironic sincerity," citing scenes like the opening credits sequence. However, he described the film as "mostly an amateur-hour fiasco", said the central romantic pairing lacked credibility, and opined the only worthwhile performance was Short's. Ernest Hardy of LA Weekly also gave the film a negative review, calling it a "lobotomized updating of A Midsummer Night's Dream".

In March 2001, the Hartford Courant compared it to the Christopher Guest film Waiting for Guffman. That same month, the New York Daily News also compared it to Waiting for Guffman, saying that Martin Short's character is "like Corky from Waiting for Guffman but without the plaintiveness".

=== Box office ===
Get Over It grossed $11.6 million domestically (United States and Canada) and $8.3 million in other territories, for a worldwide total of $19.9 million, failing to cover its production-only budget of $22 million. It spent one week in the Top 10 at the domestic box office.

== Music ==
The soundtrack album was released by Island Records on March 13, 2001.

No.	Title	Writer(s)	Performed by	Length
1.	"Get With Me"	LaShawn Daniels, Rodney Jerkins and Mischke	Shorty 101	4:08
2.	"Sho 'Nuff"	Norman Cook, David Dundas, Roger Greenaway and Andre Williams	Fatboy Slim	5:09
3.	"Bingo Bango"	Felix Buxton and Simon Ratcliffe	Basement Jaxx	3:46
4.	"Another Perfect Day"	Stacy Jones	American Hi-Fi	3:38
5.	"Perfect World"	Evan Rogers and Carl Sturken	Mikaila	3:58
6.	"Alison"	Elvis Costello	Elvis Costello & The Attractions	3:22
7.	"The Shining"	Damon Gough	Badly Drawn Boy	5:19
8.	"Goldmine"	Caviar	Caviar	3:37
9.	"Love Will Keep Us Together"	Howard Greenfield and Neil Sedaka	Captain & Tennille	3:23
10.	"Dream of Me"	Marc Shaiman and Scott Wittman	Kirsten Dunst	3:11
11.	"Arnaldo Said"	Darian Sahanaja	The Wondermints	3:48
12.	"I'll Never Fall in Love Again"	Burt Bacharach and Hal David	Splitsville	3:31
13.	"Get On It"	Rob McDowell and Justin Morey	Resident Filters	2:59
14.	"Would You...?"	David Lowe	Touch and Go	3:09
15.	"That Green Jesus"	Aaron Gilbert	Mr. Natural	4:34

=== Featured music ===
Other music featured in the film but omitted from the soundtrack includes:

- "Happiness (The Eat Me Edit)" – Pizzaman
- "Magic Carpet Ride (Matt Philly Remix)" – The Mighty Dub Katz
- "Champion Birdwatchers" – LA Symphony
- "Love Scud" – The Swingtown Lads
- "Morse" – Nightmares on Wax
- "A Little Soul (Lafayette Velvet Revisited Mix)" – Pulp
- "Reach Inside" – Boh Samba
- "Phthalo Blue" – The Fairways
- "The Itch" – Vitamin C
- "Get On It (Krafty Kuts Latin Funk Mix)" – Resident Filters
- "Pass It On" – Keoki
- "September" – Sisqó & Vitamin C
