= Raw, the Best of Lady Saw =

Raw, The Best of Lady Saw

Compilation album by Lady Saw
- Released: February 10, 1998
- Genre: Dancehall, reggae
- Length: 66:04
- Label: VP
- Producer: David Sanguinetti (exec); Dave Kelly; Castro Brown; Bobby "Digital" Dixon; Tony Kelly; Lady Saw; Patrick Roberts

Lady Saw chronology
Passion (Album) (1997)	Raw, The Best of Lady Saw (1998)	99 Ways (1998)

Professional ratings
Review scores
Source	Rating
Allmusic	link

This is the first greatest hits album by Jamaican singer Lady Saw, released on February 10, 1998, by VP Records, it was the first of two albums to be released in 1998, by Lady Saw, the second being her fourth studio album 99 Ways, released almost 10 months later. The album was well received and rated 4.5 stars by AMG.

== Track listing ==
#	Title	Guest Performances	Time
1	" Hardcore (It's Raining)"		3:38
2	"Find a Good Man"		3:34
3	"Sycamore Tree"		3:32
4	"If Him Lef"		3:45
5	"Strange Feeling"		3:56
6	"Good Wuk"		3:22
7	"Eh-Em"		2:36
8	"Give Me a Reason"		3:50
9	"Healing"	Beenie Man	3:33
10	"No Long Talking"		3:43
11	"Hot Man a Road"		3:50
12	"Hice It Up"		3:17
13	"Serious Allegations"		3:19
14	"Stab Out the Meat"		3:55
15	"Darnest Things"		3:13
16	"Mama "G""		3:53
17	"Life Without Dick"		3:28
18	"Woman Wi Name"		2:41
19	"Gal No Worry"		2:59

== Sources ==
- Raw, the Best of Lady Saw at AllMusic
