= As Long as You're Loving Me =

2001 single by Vitamin C

Single by Vitamin C

from the album More and See Spot Run
- B-side: "She Talks About Love"
- Released: January 23, 2001
- Length: 4:11
- Label: Elektra
- Songwriters: Guy Roche; Shelly Peiken
- Producer: Guy Roche

Vitamin C singles chronology
"The Itch" (2000)	"As Long as You're Loving Me" (2001)	"Last Nite" (2003)

"As Long as You're Loving Me" is a song by American singer-songwriter Vitamin C, released as the second and final single from her second album, More (2001), in January 2001. The ballad was written by Shelly Peiken and Guy Roche.

== Reception ==
"As Long as You're Loving Me" peaked at number 45 on New Zealand's RIANZ Singles Chart. The single failed to chart in the US.

== Music video ==
The music video for "As Long as You're Loving Me" shows Vitamin C singing to scenes from the movie See Spot Run.

== Track listing ==
Australian CD single

1. "As Long as You're Loving Me" (remix)
2. "As Long as You're Loving Me" (radio edit)
3. "As Long as You're Loving Me" (album version)
4. "She Talks About Love" (album version)

== Charts ==
Chart (2001)	Peak position
New Zealand (Recorded Music NZ)	45

== Release history ==
Region	Date	Format(s)	Label(s)	Ref.
United States	January 23, 2001	Top 40 radio	Elektra	
United States	February 12, 2001	Adult contemporary; hot adult contemporary radio	Elektra	
Australia	April 2, 2001	CD	Elektra	
