= Me, Myself and I (Vitamin C song) =

1999 single by Vitamin C

Single by Vitamin C

from the album Vitamin C
- B-side: "Money"
- Released: October 19, 1999
- Length: 3:47
- Label: Elektra
- Songwriters: Gregg Rolie; Michael John Carabello; Thomas Coke Escobedo
- Producers: Josh Deutsch; Garry Hughes

Vitamin C singles chronology
"Smile" (1999)	"Me, Myself and I" (1999)	"Graduation (Friends Forever)" (2000)

"Me, Myself and I" is a song by American singer-songwriter Vitamin C, released as a single on October 19, 1999. Written by Gregg Rolie, Michael John Carabello, and Thomas Coke Escovedo, it was the second single released from Vitamin C's 1999 debut album, Vitamin C. The chorus contains a sample from the Santana song "No One to Depend On", from their 1971 Santana III album.

== Reception ==
The single never entered the US Billboard Hot 100 but peaked at number 36 on the Top 40 Mainstream chart and number 20 on the Bubbling Under Hot 100 Singles chart.

== Music video ==
The music video for the song was directed by Nigel Dick and features Johnny Knoxville.

== Track listings ==
US CD and cassette single

1. "Me, Myself and I" (radio edit) – 3:47
2. "Money" (album version) – 3:45

German CD single

1. "Me, Myself and I" (radio edit) – 3:48
2. "Me, Myself and I" (Pablo Flores Miami Mix radio edit) – 4:36
3. "Me, Myself and I" (Jonathan Peters radio edit) – 4:00

== Charts ==
Chart (2000)	Peak position
US Bubbling Under Hot 100 (Billboard)	20
US Mainstream Top 40 (Billboard)	36
