= Eve's Plum =

American rock band (1991–1998)

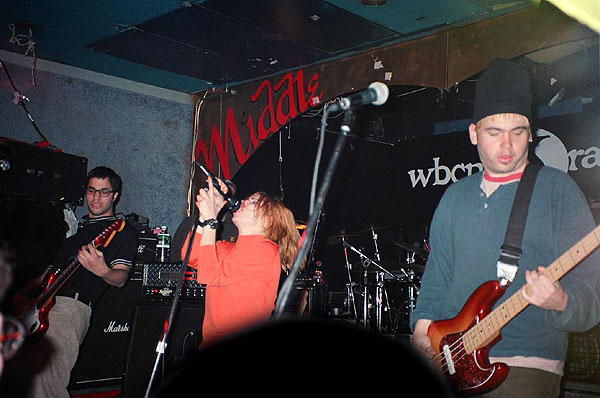
- Eve's Plum performing at the Middle East Restaurant and Nightclub in 1995

Background information
- Origin: New York City, United States
- Genres: Alternative rock, power pop, grunge
- Years active: 1991–1998
- Labels: 550, Epic
- Past members: Colleen Fitzpatrick; Michael Kotch; Ben Kotch; Theo Mack; Chris Giammalvo

Eve's Plum was an American New York City-based rock band, active in the 1990s. The band was fronted by Colleen Fitzpatrick, who was later known by the stage name Vitamin C. Eve's Plum released two albums and seven singles on 550 Music/Epic Records, before breaking up in 1998.

== Formation ==
In 1991, Ben Kotch who played drums, and his twin brother Michael who played guitar, had been looking to start a band and needed a singer and bassist. Michael Kotch met Colleen Fitzpatrick while both were in school at New York University; she became the group's singer and together they formed the group Eve's Plum. Chris Giammalvo joined the band on bass guitar. He would later be replaced on bass by Theo Mack in 1994.

== 550/Epic releases ==
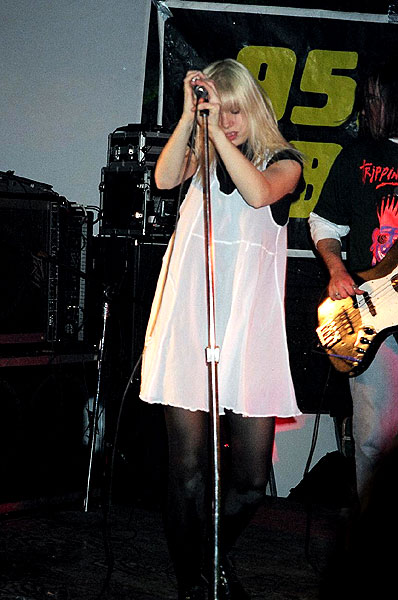
Eve's Plum performing live in 1994

Eve's Plum toured independently throughout 1991 and 1992. The band signed a recording contract with Sony Records in 1992. Their debut album, Envy, was produced by Roger Greenawalt and released in 1993. The group's debut album failed to chart on the Billboard 200. The first single, "Blue", was also released in 1993 and was shown on an episode of Beavis and Butthead but did not chart on the Billboard Hot 100. A "demonstration" version of the single in CD format was also released to radio stations that contained an additional song, "Twist It" that was not on the album - as well as the songs "Blue" and "Envy" from the album. The band's second single "Die Like Someone", also failed to make an impact. The album's third single, "I Want It All", became the only single of their career to chart. It spent one week on the Modern Rock Chart at number 30 and two weeks in the UK Top 100 peaking at #78. It was also featured in the film The Next Karate Kid. In 1994, Eve's Plum released the I Want It All Alive EP. The EP was a limited release. That same year Chris Giammalvo left the band and was replaced by Theo Mack on bass.

In 1995, Eve's Plum recorded the single "Eye", for the soundtrack to the film Higher Learning. The band also appeared in the film performing the song during the carnival scene. The group's second album, Cherry Alive, was released in September 1995. The first single released from the album was called "Jesus Loves You (Not As Much As I Do)". The single failed to chart. Although three more singles were released from Cherry Alive to radio: "Wishing the Day Away", "Cherry Alive", and "Fairy Princess", none of the singles were successful for the band and 550 Music dropped the group in 1996. Shortly before being dropped by their label the band, after wrapping a promotional tour for Cherry Alive, returned to their home of NYC to write new songs for what would have been their third album. In the summer of 1996 they wrote a few new songs and performed a show in Albany, New York. The show was recorded, and released as Eve's Plum Live in Albany. However, it is extremely rare and it is unknown if any surviving copies still exist.

There are a few songs which were performed live but didn't make it to a studio album, such as "Ride with You" (which was supposed to be on Cherry Alive), "Lost in Space" (recorded for a compilation), "Ice Cream", "The Way You Look", "So What", and "Twist It" (released as a B-side).

== Break up and post Eve's Plum ==
Fitzpatrick promoting her solo work as Vitamin C

They continued to perform after being dropped by their label. A cover version of "Save a Prayer", on Mojo Records' 1997 The Duran Duran Tribute Album, was their final released recording.

Colleen Fitzpatrick has had commercial success with a solo career under the name Vitamin C. Michael Kotch, who married Fitzpatrick in 2004, went on to play in the band Ruth Ruth. Benjamin Kotch went on to drum for The World/Inferno Friendship Society from 1997 to 2007. Chris Giammalvo joined Madder Rose in 1997 and played on their last two albums. Theo Mack went on to become a sound man, touring with various bands.

== Band members ==
- Colleen Fitzpatrick — vocals (1991–1998)
- Michael Kotch — guitars (1991–1998)
- Benjamin Kotch — drums (1991–1998)
- Chris Giammalvo — bass (1991–1994)
- Theo Mack — bass (1994–1998)

== Discography ==
Albums

Year	Album	Additional information
1993	Envy	Debut studio album
1994	I Want It All ALIVE E.P.	Live EP
1995	Cherry Alive	Second and final studio album

Singles

Year	Song	Album
1993	Blue^{1}	Envy
1993	Die Like Someone^{1}	Envy
1994	I Want It All^{1}	Envy
1995	Eye^{2}	Higher Learning soundtrack
1995	Jesus Loves You (Not As Much As I Do)^{1}	Cherry Alive
1995	Wishing the Day Away^{2}	Cherry Alive
1995	Cherry Alive^{2}	Cherry Alive

- ^{1} denotes singles that had music videos filmed.
- ^{2} denotes singles that were only promotional.
