= Vitamin C (album) =

Studio album by Vitamin C
- Released: August 31, 1999
- Genre: Pop
- Length: 47:27
- Label: Elektra
- Producers: Josh Deutsch; Garry Hughes

Vitamin C chronology
| Vitamin C (1999) | More (2001) |

Singles from Vitamin C
- 1. "Smile" Released: June 8, 1999; 2. "Me, Myself & I" Released: October 19, 1999; 3. "Graduation (Friends Forever)" Released: March 7, 2000

Vitamin C is the debut studio album by American pop singer Vitamin C, released in 1999. Initially failing to chart, the album later became a success, climbing the Billboard 200 to number 29. It was certified as gold and later certified platinum by the RIAA.

The album spawned two hits, the gold-selling top 20 hit "Smile" and the top 40 hit "Graduation (Friends Forever)". The album features guest appearances by Lady Saw, Count Bass D, and Waymon Boone. On the track "Fear of Flying", Vitamin C samples the Clash's "The Magnificent Seven". The Japanese edition features the bonus track "The Only One".

== Critical reception ==
Professional ratings
Review scores
| Source | Rating |
|---|---|
| AllMusic | 4/5 stars |
| Entertainment Weekly | A− |
| People | (favorable) |
| Rolling Stone | 2.5/5 stars |

The album elicited generally positive reviews from music critics upon its release. Tom Demalon, writing for AllMusic, praised Vitamin C's range, adding that "there is no shortage of hooks" on the album and concluding that "there's not a weak track on this stellar record." Entertainment Weekly gave the album an "A−" and called the album "the unabashedly great pop album the Spice Girls might have made (but never quite did)."

However, some critics were less favorable in their assessments of the album. Rolling Stone's Neva Chonin awarded the album two and a half stars, praising the album's stylistic range but criticizing its production, which she felt "makes it difficult to tell where the cut-and-paste production ends and Vitamin C begins."

== Track listing ==
| No. | Title | Writer(s) | Length |
|---|---|---|---|
| 1. | "Smile" (featuring Lady Saw) | Colleen Fitzpatrick; Josh Deutsch | 3:58 |
| 2. | "Turn Me On" | Fitzpatrick; Deutsch; Michael D. Goodman | 3:47 |
| 3. | "Me, Myself and I" | Gregg Rolie; Michael John Carabello; Thomas Coke Escobedo | 3:57 |
| 4. | "Unhappy Anniversary" | Sean Altman; Neol Cohen | 3:56 |
| 5. | "Not That Kind of Girl" | Fitzpatrick; Michael Kotch | 3:27 |
| 6. | "Do What You Want to Do" | Fitzpatrick; Deutsch; George Clinton; Bootsy Collins; David Elliott; Gregory Jacobs; Terrence Woodford; Bernard Worrell; Herbert Ivey | 3:21 |
| 7. | "Girls Against Boys" (featuring Count Bass D) | Fitzpatrick; Kotch; Matt Mahaffey | 4:16 |
| 8. | "I Got You" | Neil Finn | 4:01 |
| 9. | "Money" (featuring Waymon Boone) | Fitzpatrick; Deutsch | 3:47 |
| 10. | "About Last Night" | Fitzpatrick; Robbie Nevil | 4:01 |
| 11. | "Fear of Flying" | Jimmy Harry; Mick Jones; Joe Strummer; Topper Headon | 3:16 |
| 12. | "Graduation (Friends Forever)" | Fitzpatrick; Deutsch | 5:40 |
| Total length: | | | 47:27 |

US reissue bonus track
| No. | Title | Length |
|---|---|---|
| 13. | "Graduation (Friends Forever)" (Student Interview Mix) (hidden track) | 5:40 |

Japanese bonus track
| No. | Title | Length |
|---|---|---|
| 13. | "The Only One" | 2:52 |

== Personnel ==
- Vitamin C – vocals, composition, backing vocals
- Ada Dyer – backing vocals (3, 6, 9, 12)
- Sean Altman – backing vocals (4)
- Vaneese Thomas – backing vocals (1, 2, 3, 6, 9, 10, 12)
- David Rainger – guitar (1, 2, 3, 6, 9, 10)
- Fred Maher – guitar (5, 8)
- Josh Deutsch – guitar (1), production
- Michael Kotch – guitar (5)
- David Rainger – bass (9, 10)
- Melvin Gibbs – bass (3, 4, 6, 12)
- Alan Friedman – keyboards (3)
- Fred Maher – keyboards (5, 8)
- Jimmy Harry – production (11)
- Garry Hughes – keyboards (1, 2, 3, 4, 6, 9, 10, 12)
- Ashley Horne – viola (12)
- Denise Stillwell – viola (12)
- Jill Jaffe – viola (12)
- Joel Rudin – viola (12)
- Mark Wood – viola (12)
- Martha Mooke – viola (12)
- Ron Lawrence – viola (12)
- Sally Shumway – viola (12)
- Sandy Robbins – viola (12)
- Gregor Kitzis – violin (12)
- Laura Seaton – violin (12)
- Mary Rowell – violin (12)
- Paul Woodiel – violin (12)
- Dan Barrett – cello (12)
- Mary Wooten – cello (12)
- Matt Goeke – cello (12)
- Jonas Tauber – cello (12)
- Suzie Katayama – cello (8)

== Charts ==
=== Weekly charts ===
| Chart (1999–2000) | Peak position |
|---|---|
| US Billboard 200 | 29 |
| US Heatseekers Albums (Billboard) | 3 |

=== Year-end charts ===
| Chart (2000) | Position |
|---|---|
| US Billboard 200 | 165 |

== Certifications ==
| Region | Certification | Certified units/sales |
|---|---|---|
| United States (RIAA) | Platinum | 1,000,000^{^} |
^{^} Shipments figures based on certification alone.
