= Graduation (Friends Forever) =

2000 single by Vitamin C

Single by Vitamin C

from the album Vitamin C
- Released: March 7, 2000
- Studio: Axis (New York City); Right Track (New York City) (strings)
- Length: 5:39 (album version); 4:26 (radio edit)
- Label: Elektra
- Songwriters: Colleen Fitzpatrick; Josh Deutsch
- Producers: Josh Deutsch; Garry Hughes

Vitamin C singles chronology
| "Me, Myself and I" (1999) | "Graduation (Friends Forever)" (2000) | "The Itch" (2000) |

Alternative cover
- German cover

Music video
- "Graduation (Friends Forever)" on YouTube

"Graduation (Friends Forever)" (also titled "Friends Forever (Graduation)") is a song by American pop singer Vitamin C, released as the third single from her self-titled debut studio album (1999) and is the final song on the record. Vitamin C wrote the song as a response to how many friends drift apart soon after graduation from high school. Josh Deutsch co-wrote the song with her and also produced the track alongside Garry Hughes. The song is partly orchestrated, featuring a string arrangement based on Pachelbel's Canon in D and a vocal appearance from the NYC All-City Chorus. One version of the song contains student interviews from the Class of 2000 of Lyndhurst High School in New Jersey.

Following its release in March 2000, "Graduation" charted in several countries. It reached the top 10 in Canada and Ireland and peaked at number two in Australia, where the Australian Recording Industry Association (ARIA) awarded the song a platinum sales certification. In the United States, it reached number 38 on the US Billboard Hot 100, becoming Vitamin C's second top-50 hit on this chart. The music video, directed by Gregory Dark, features Vitamin C in a school building while a blonde girl attempts to speak with her crush before the end of the day.

The song was sampled in the 2019 song "Graduation" by Benny Blanco and Juice Wrld. A new version of the song, titled "Graduation 2020 (Worst Year Ever)", was recorded in 2020 as a reflection on the year with regard to the COVID-19 pandemic. This version, created by Vizzy Hard Seltzer and Canadian advertising agency Rethink Communications, contains newly recorded lyrics from Vitamin C, who donated her appearance fee to several charitable organizations.

== Background ==
Speaking to Billboard magazine, Vitamin C revealed the meaning behind "Graduation" in April 2000. One Sunday, while she was writing songs, she began to reminisce about the past and think about the future, comparing the mixed emotions of both scenarios. "It became a very emotional song to write and one that wasn't initially about graduation at all," she explained. "I think it represents a template for graduation from high school or college, from job to job, for whenever people move on in their lives." Vitamin C believes the song's message becomes clearer several years after graduating high school, when people become better aware of their emotions and begin to recognize the feeling of detachment.

== Content ==
The song is based on Pachelbel's Canon in D and includes vocals from the NYC All-City Chorus. An alternate version of the song features interviews of Lyndhurst High School's (New Jersey) Class of 2000, in which Vitamin C speaks with several students about their friendships and futures.

== Commercial performance ==
The single reached number 12 on the US Billboard Mainstream Top 40 chart, number 23 on the Billboard Rhythmic Top 40, and number 38 on the Billboard Hot 100 on May 30, 2000, becoming Vitamin C's second single to reach the top 40, after "Smile". Worldwide, it reached number 21 in New Zealand, number 13 in Sweden, number seven in Canada, and number four in Ireland. Although it was a hit in Ireland, it did not chart in the United Kingdom. The song found the most commercial success in Australia, where it climbed to number two in December 2000 and was certified platinum by the ARIA. It was Australia's 13th-most-successful song of 2000.

== Music video ==
The music video for "Graduation (Friends Forever)" was directed by Gregory Dark. It features Vitamin C performing in a high school with various scenes interspersed throughout. Several of these clips feature a blonde girl struggling to talk to her crush, which she manages to accomplish before the final school day ends. During the video, Vitamin C dances with cheerleaders, sings with a choir, and watches the girl as she meets up with her crush by his locker. At the end of the video, the students leave the school while the singer stands motionless on the front steps. Once they are gone, she walks back into the empty building.

== "Graduation 2020 (Worst Year Ever)" ==
In 2020, Vizzy Hard Seltzer, a brand of the Molson Coors Beverage Company, worked together with Vitamin C and Canadian advertising agency Rethink Communications to create a new version of the song titled "Graduation 2020 (Worst Year Ever)", with the lyrics changed to reflect on life during the COVID-19 pandemic. The company, which infuses ascorbic acid (Vitamin C) into its seltzer, asked the singer to provide new lyrics for the song. Vizzy Hard Seltzer director Elizabeth Hitch explained that the company wanted to send off 2020 with a memorable campaign, saying, "As the first hard seltzer with Vitamin C, it only made sense to pair-up with Vitamin C, the artist with the most iconic farewell anthem ever." When the company presented the offer to Vitamin C, she decided to use it as an opportunity for fundraising, and she donated her appearance fee, which Vizzy Hard Seltzer soon matched, to the United States Bartenders' Guild and the COVID-19 LA County Response Fund.

== Track listings ==
Australian maxi-CD single

1. "Friends Forever (Graduation)" (edit) – 4:26
2. "Friends Forever (Graduation)" (LP version) – 5:40
3. "Not That Kind of Girl" (LP version) – 3:28

European CD single

1. "Friends Forever (Graduation)" (edit) – 4:26
2. "Friends Forever (Graduation)" (LP version) – 5:40

German maxi-CD single

1. "Graduation (Friends Forever)" (LP version) – 5:39
2. "Me, Myself and I" (Pablo Flores Miami Mix – radio edit) – 4:36
3. "Me, Myself and I" (Jonathan Peters radio edit) – 4:00

== Credits and personnel ==
Credits are taken from the European CD single liner notes and the Vitamin C album liner notes.

Studios

- Recorded at Axis Studios (New York City)
- Strings recorded at Right Track Studios (New York City)
- Mixed at Sony NYC (New York City)
- Mastered at Powers House of Sound and Sterling Sound (New York City)

Main personnel

- Vitamin C – writing (as Colleen Fitzpatrick), vocals
- Josh Deutsch – writing, production, programming
- Vaneese Thomas – background vocals
- Ada Dyer – background vocals
- All City Chorus – choir
- Patricia Pates Eaton – All City Chorus music directing
- Garry Hughes – keyboards
- Melvin Gibbs – bass guitar
- Malcolm Michiles – DJ
- Garry Hughes – production, programming
- Lloyd Puckitt – recording
- Tony Maserati – mixing
- Ethan Schofer – mixing assistance
- Mario DeArce – Pro Tools mixing operation
- Herb Powers – mastering

Orchestra

- Gregor Kitzis – violin, concertmaster
- Mary Rowell – violin
- Laura Seaton – violin
- Paul Woodiel – violin
- Mary Wooten – cello
- Dan Barrett – cello
- Jonas Tauber – cello
- Matt Goeke – cello
- Jill Jaffe – viola
- Sandy Robbins – viola
- Ron Lawrence – viola
- Sally Shumway – viola
- Ashley Horne – viola
- Joel Rudin – viola
- Martha Mooke – viola
- Denise Stillwell – viola
- Mark Wood – viola
- Peter "Ski" Schwartz – string arrangement writing and conducting
- Hugo Dwyer – string recording
- Jason Stasium – string recording assistance
- Andrew Fellus – string recording assistance

== Charts ==
=== Weekly charts ===
| Chart (2000) | Peak position |
|---|---|
| Australia (ARIA) | 2 |
| Canada Top Singles (RPM) | 7 |
| Canada Adult Contemporary (RPM) | 33 |
| Ireland (IRMA) | 4 |
| New Zealand (Recorded Music NZ) | 21 |
| Sweden (Sverigetopplistan) | 13 |
| US Billboard Hot 100 | 38 |
| US Mainstream Top 40 (Billboard) | 12 |
| US Rhythmic Top 40 (Billboard) | 23 |

=== Year-end charts ===
| Chart (2000) | Position |
|---|---|
| Australia (ARIA) | 13 |
| Ireland (IRMA) | 16 |
| US Mainstream Top 40 (Billboard) | 64 |
| US Rhythmic Top 40 (Billboard) | 97 |

== Certifications ==
| Region | Certification | Certified units/sales |
|---|---|---|
| Australia (ARIA) | Platinum | 70,000^{^} |
^{^} Shipments figures based on certification alone.
