= Smile (Vitamin C song) =

1999 single by Vitamin C

Single by Vitamin C featuring Lady Saw

from the album Vitamin C
- Released: June 8, 1999
- Studio: Axis (New York City)
- Genre: Dancehall pop
- Length: 3:58
- Label: Elektra
- Songwriters: Colleen Fitzpatrick; Josh Deutsch
- Producers: Josh Deutsch; Garry Hughes

Vitamin C singles chronology
"Smile" (1999)	"Me, Myself and I" (1999)

Audio
- "Smile" (radio edit) on YouTube

"Smile" is the debut single of American singer Vitamin C, featuring vocals from Jamaican reggae singer Lady Saw. "Smile" was the first single released from Vitamin C's self-titled debut album on June 8, 1999. Using television exposure as a major form of promotion, the song became a top-40 hit in Canada, Iceland, New Zealand, and the United States.

== Background and release ==
According to Vitamin C, she had trouble coming up with the song's lyrics. On the day she wrote them, she was feeling sad about the breakup of her former band, Eve's Plum, and decided that she needed to write a happy song to move past her depression. Elektra Records released "Smile" as a 12-inch single on June 8, 1999, and as a CD, maxi-CD, and cassette single on June 29 of the same year. On June 22, 1999, Elektra Records serviced "Smile" to American pop and rhythmic radio stations.

== Commercial performance ==
"Smile" became Vitamin C's highest-charting single in the United States, peaking at number 21 on the Billboard Mainstream Top 40 and number 18 on the Billboard Hot 100, becoming her only single to reach the top 20 and her first single to reach the top 40. Worldwide, "Smile" peaked at number 13 in New Zealand, number 24 in Iceland, and number 29 in Canada. In the US, the single received a gold certification from the Recording Industry Association of America (RIAA) for shipments in excess of 500,000. Billboard attributed the song's success to its intense promotion via television, including featuring in advertisements for The WB series Movie Stars, promos for the NBC series Cold Feet, and the season 9 finale of Beverly Hills, 90210.

== Music video ==
The music video takes place in a multi-colored Sam Goody CD store which has several motifs from the album art. Lady Saw plays a DJ in the video, while Vitamin C dances with a few backup dancers to the song ("Smile") that Lady Saw is playing. The video was directed by Christopher Erskin.

== Track listings ==
US CD single

1. "Smile" (album version)
2. "Smile" (Maserati mix)
3. "Smile" (video)

US maxi-CD single

1. "Smile" (Mr. Mig's extended mix)
2. "Smile" (radio edit)
3. "Smile" (dub mix)
4. "Smile" (Maserati mix)
5. "Smile" (a cappella)
6. "Smile" (album version)
7. "Smile" (video)

US 12-inch single

A1. "Smile" (Mr. Mig's extended mix)
A2. "Smile" (radio edit)
B1. "Smile" (dub mix)
B2. "Smile" (Maserati mix)
B3. "Smile" (acapella)

US cassette single

1. "Smile"
2. "Smile" (Maserati mix)

UK CD single

1. "Smile" (radio edit) – 3:24
2. "Smile" (rapless edit) – 3:34
3. "Smile" (Maserati mix) – 4:03

European CD single

1. "Smile" (radio edit) – 3:24
2. "Smile" (album version) – 3:57

European maxi-CD single

1. "Smile" (radio edit) – 3:24
2. "Smile" (Mr. Mig's club mix) – 3:47
3. "Smile" (rapless edit) – 3:34
4. "Smile" (Maserati mix) – 4:03

Australian CD single

1. "Smile" (radio edit)
2. "Smile" (Maserati mix)
3. "Smile" (Mr. Mig's club mix)
4. "Smile" (LP version)
5. "Smile" (rapless edit)
6. "Smile" (video)

== Credits and personnel ==
Credits are lifted from the US CD single and Vitamin C liner notes.

Studios

- Recorded at Axis Studios (New York City)
- Mixed at Quad Recording Studios and Avatar Studios (New York City)
- Mastered at Sterling Sound (New York City)

Personnel

- Vitamin C – writing (as Colleen Fitzpatrick)
- Josh Deutsch – writing, production
- Garry Hughes – production
- Lloyd Puckitt – recording
- Michael Patterson – mixing
- Ann Mincieli – mixing assistance (Quad)
- Greg Gasperino – mixing assistance (Avatar)

== Charts ==
=== Weekly charts ===
Chart (1999–2000)	Peak position
Australia (ARIA)	138
Canada Top Singles (RPM)	29
Canada Adult Contemporary (RPM)	74
Germany (GfK)	95
Iceland (Íslenski Listinn Topp 40)	24
Italy Airplay (Music & Media)	3
Netherlands (Dutch Top 40 Tipparade)	9
Netherlands (Single Top 100)	88
New Zealand (Recorded Music NZ)	13
US Billboard Hot 100	18
US Mainstream Top 40 (Billboard)	21
US Maxi-Singles Sales (Billboard)	24

=== Year-end charts ===
Chart (1999)	Position
US Mainstream Top 40 (Billboard)	88

== Certifications ==
Region	Certification	Certified units/sales
United States (RIAA)	Gold	500,000^{^}
^{^} Shipments figures based on certification alone.
