= Lady Saw =

Jamaican singer (born 1969)

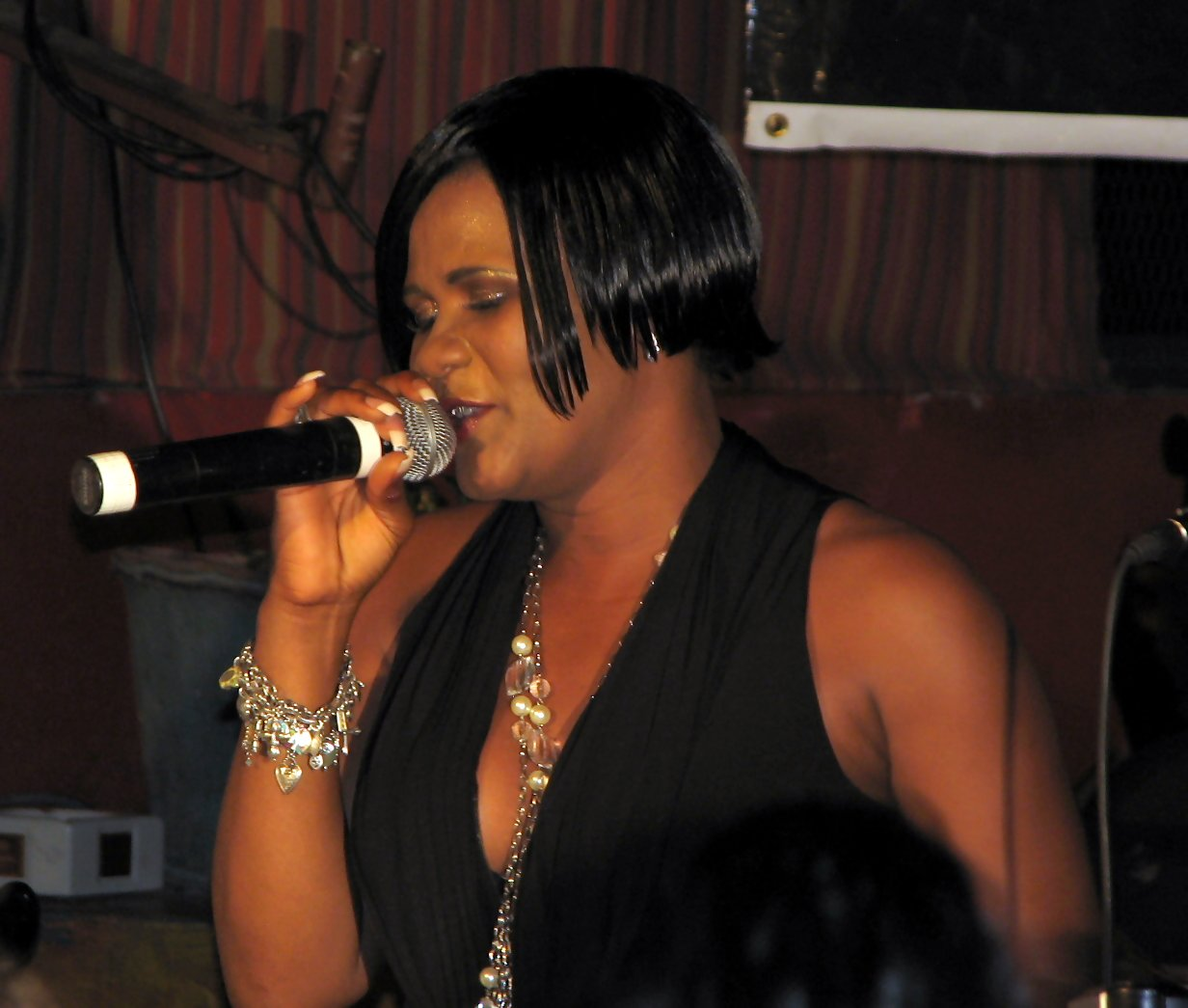
- Hall performing in 2007

Background information
- Also known as: Minister Marion Hall
- Born: Marion Marie Hall; 12 July 1969 (age 57); Galina, Saint Mary Parish, Jamaica
- Genres: Dancehall; reggae; gospel
- Occupations: Singer; songwriter
- Instrument: Vocals
- Years active: 1987–2020; 2023–present
- Labels: Divas; Toasting; VP

Marion Marie Hall (born 12 July 1969), formerly known by the stage name Lady Saw, is a Jamaican singer whose career has spanned over two decades. Formerly known as the "Queen of Dancehall", she is known for her guest appearances on Vitamin C's debut single "Smile" (1999) and No Doubt's "Underneath It All" (2002), the latter of which went triple Platinum and won a Grammy for No Doubt.

== Early life ==
Hall was born in the village of Galina, Saint Mary Parish, Jamaica near Port Maria . As a child, she attended Galina Primary School. During her teen years, she had a sewing job at The Free Zone in Kingston. At the age of fifteen, she began performing with local sound systems. She went on to work with the Stereo One system in Kingston.

== Career ==
=== 1987–1995: Lover Girl ===
In 1987, Hall took the name "Lady Saw" after the famous Jamaican singer Tenor Saw, who inspired her music. Her performances brought her to the attention of record producers and she recorded her first single for producer Piper, and "Love Me or Lef Me", produced by Olive Shaw received significant airplay. She topped the charts with her first hits "If Him Lef" and "Find a Good Man". After her music success on Jamaican radio, she began recording her first studio album. In August 1994, Saw released her first album entitled Lover Girl. The album spawned the hit "Stab Up De Meat".

=== 1996–1997: Give Me the Reason and Passion ===
In 1996, Saw released her second album Give Me the Reason. The album became known for its explicit sexual lyrics which was showcased on songs "Life Without Dick" and "Name Nuh Stand Fi Sex". The album spawned the singles "Give Me the Reason", "Good Wuk", and "Condom".

In June 1997, Saw released Passion. The album charted at number 8 on Billboard's Top Reggae Albums chart, becoming her first album to chart. The album spawned the singles: "Healing" and "Sycamore Tree".

=== 1998–2003: 99 Ways ===
In February 1998, Saw released her first greatest hits album entitled Raw, the Best of Lady Saw. In December 1998, Saw released her fourth album 99 Ways, which charted at number 10 on Billboard's Top Reggae Albums chart.

In 1999 she had a major hit in the United States with "Smile", recorded with Vitamin C, which peaked at number 18 on the Billboard Hot 100, also a major hit in New Zealand and Canada, and certified gold with over 500,000 sales. In 2002, her collaboration with No Doubt, "Underneath It All", which reached number three in the US and sold more than three million copies, reaching triple platinum certification. The track won No Doubt a Grammy Award for 'Best Performance by a Duo or Group'.

=== 2004–2007: Strip Tease and Walk Out ===
In August 2004, Lady Saw released her fifth album Strip Tease. The album charted at number 84 on Billboard's Top R&B/Hip-Hop Albums chart and number 14 Billboard's Top Reggae Albums chart. The lead single "I've Got Your Man" garnered much worldwide success and charted at number 58 on Billboard's Hot R&B/Hip-Hop Songs. The album also spawn the singles: "Man is the Least", "Move Your Body", and "Loser".

In 2006, she was featured on the Steven Seagal song "Strut", which she also co-wrote. It has achieved internet fame under the incorrect name Me Want The Punani, a repeated lyric from the song.

In March 2007, Saw released the single "No Less Than a Woman (Infertility)". The song addressed the many problems that women have involving infertility. In April 2007, Saw released her sixth album Walk Out, which peaked at number 8 on the Top Reggae Albums chart. Saw released two more singles: "Chat to Mi Back" and "Me and My Crew (The Rae)". Later that year, she performed on the main stage at Jamaica's annual Reggae Sumfest.

=== 2009–2015: My Way and Alter Ego ===
In 2009, Saw released her second greatest hits album entitled Extra Raw: The First Lady of Dancehall. She launched her own record label, Divas Records, in January 2010. In August 2010, Saw released the lead single "Party Till December" from her forthcoming album. In December 2010, she released My Way, which failed to chart. In the same year, Lady Saw was also featured along with Nicki Minaj on rapper Trina's song "Dang A Lang" from her album Amazin'. In May 2011, she released a single "When Mi Left a Man".

In 2012, she released an extended play entitled "Two Man". In October 2012, Saw released a single "Heels On". In November 2012 she announced that she was turning her back on dancehall and would be concentrating on Gospel music in the future. In August 2013, Saw released a single "Nuh Tek Mi Man".

In 2014, she released her album Alter Ego, which features guest appearances from Beres Hammond, Flo Rida, and Ali Campbell. The album charted at number 6 on the Top Reggae Albums chart. In the same year, she established The Lady Saw Foundation; which aims to help abused and needy women.

In March 2015, she released a single "Scammer". In May 2015, Saw released the single "Incline Thine Ears". In June 2015, she released a two singles "Last Night" and "The Devil Have a Way". In August 2015, Saw released a single "The Day Will Never Come". In September 2015, she released the single "Likkle Bit". In November 2015, Singing Melody released the single "Beneath Your Beautiful", which featured Lady Saw. On 6 November 2015, she released her second extended play entitled, Lady Saw: Special Edition. In December 2015, she released a single "Lay On Your Body".

=== 2016–present: Conversion to Christianity and retirement from dancehall music ===
On 15 December 2015, Saw underwent a baptism. She later stated she will no longer identify herself as "Lady Saw", but instead as Minister Marion Hall or simply Marion Hall. She also stated that she will not perform dancehall music, but instead she will begin a new music career in gospel music. She released a few gospel songs: "Jesus in the End", "Cup of Blessings", "God Almighty", and "Heaven", which appear on several mixtapes. In July 2016, she released her first gospel album When God Speaks.

In June 2018, Hall released the lead single, "I'm Gonna Fast", from her album His Grace. The album was released on 20 July 2018.

In April 2020, Hall stated that she believed she was denied a United States O-1 visa because she no longer identified as "Lady Saw".

== Style ==
Lady Saw became known for slack performance style. The style also prompted her to record "What is Slackness?"; a song in which she defines 'slackness' in many ways. Slackness often refers to vulgarity in Jamaican culture, behavior and the music. It always sums up the explicit sexual lyrics used in reggae and dancehall music. Because of this, several of her performances were banned in some parts of Jamaica, though equally lewd male performances were not. The double standard inspired her to record the song "Freedom of Speech" in protest. She also became known for her "conscious" lyrics. She recorded "Condom"; warning girls of the dangers of unprotected heterosexual sex.

== Discography ==
- Lover Girl (1994)
- Give Me the Reason (1996)
- Passion (1997)
- 99 Ways (1998)
- Strip Tease (2004)
- Walk Out (2007)
- My Way (2010)
- Alter Ego (2014)
- When God Speaks (2016)
- His Grace (2018)
