= Vitamin C (singer) =

American singer-songwriter (born 1969)

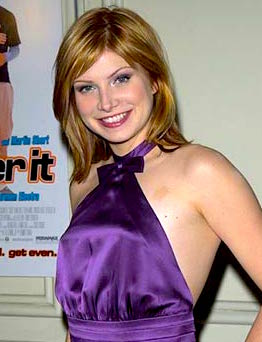
- Vitamin C at the premiere of Get Over It in 2001
- Born: Colleen Ann Fitzpatrick; July 20, 1969 (age 57); Old Bridge, New Jersey, U.S.
- Education: New York University (BA)
- Occupations: Record executive; singer-songwriter; record producer; actress
- Spouse: Michael Kotch (m. 2004)
- Children: 1
- Relatives: Ben Kotch (brother-in-law)
- Musical career
- Genres: Pop; dance-pop; electropop; alternative rock
- Instruments: Vocals; bass; keyboards
- Years active: 1987–present
- Labels: Epic; Elektra; V2
- Formerly of: Eve's Plum

Colleen Ann Fitzpatrick (born July 20, 1969), known professionally as Vitamin C, is an American record executive, singer, songwriter, record producer, and actress. She began her career as an Ivory soap baby and child actress, appearing in John Waters' film Hairspray (1988), and continued to appear in minor roles in films before launching a music career with the alternative rock band Eve's Plum in 1991.

In 1999, under the stage name Vitamin C, Fitzpatrick embarked on a solo career in pop music, releasing her eponymous debut album Vitamin C (1999), which was certified Platinum by the RIAA. Singles from the record include "Graduation (Friends Forever)" and the Top 20 single "Smile" featuring Lady Saw. Her second album, More (2001) spawned the singles "As Long as You're Loving Me" and "The Itch".

She appeared in the horror film Dracula 2000 (2000), and made cameo appearances in Get Over It (2001) and Scary Movie 2 (2001). She also appeared as a panelist on the spoof talent series The WB's Superstar USA in 2004. She was ranked No. 76 on the Maxim Hot 100 Women of 2001.

In March 2012, Fitzpatrick was appointed as Vice President of Music at Nickelodeon. Since early 2019, Fitzpatrick has served as a music executive for Netflix.

== Early life ==
Fitzpatrick was born in Old Bridge, New Jersey, on July 20, 1969. She is the youngest of three children born to Vita, a legal secretary, and Gerard Fitzpatrick, a communications executive. She is of Irish descent. She graduated from Cedar Ridge High School in 1987 (now called Old Bridge High School), where she was a classmate of Junot Díaz. During her high school years she was a dancer who danced professionally in several TV ads, and also starred in her high school musical. She later attended New York University, graduating in 1991 with a Bachelor of Arts degree in English.

== Career ==
=== Hairspray and Eve's Plum ===
In 1988, Fitzpatrick made her screen debut under her real name in the John Waters feature film Hairspray as Amber Von Tussle, the bratty on-screen daughter of co-stars Debbie Harry and Sonny Bono.

She made her first musical outing as the lead singer of the alternative rock band Eve's Plum, named after The Brady Bunch actress Eve Plumb, formed in 1991. She formed the band in 1991 with Michael Kotch and his brother Ben, whom she met while studying at New York University. A year later the group signed a record deal with Epic Records in 1992, releasing two albums and seven singles between 1993 and 1995.

=== Vitamin C and More ===
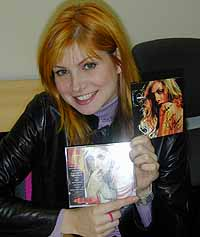
Fitzpatrick at a record signing event in 2001

In 1999, Fitzpatrick launched a pop music solo project as "Vitamin C" and signed an album deal with Elektra Records. Released in 1999, her debut solo album Vitamin C peaked on the Billboard 200 at number 29 and was certified Platinum by the RIAA. The album's first single, "Smile", peaked at number 18 on the Billboard Hot 100 and was certified Gold by the RIAA. The second single from the album, "Me, Myself & I", failed to chart. The third single "Graduation (Friends Forever)" was more successful, peaking at number 12 on the Top 40 Mainstream Chart and number 38 on the Billboard Hot 100. In Australia, the song peaked at number 2 on the ARIA Charts and was certified Platinum. It peaked at number 4 in the Republic of Ireland.

In 1999, she wrote and recorded "Vacation", which became the opening theme to the English release of the short film Pikachu's Vacation (from Pokémon: The First Movie). Vitamin C's cover version of the Frankie Valli and the Four Seasons song "December, 1963 (Oh, What a Night)" was used in promotional material for the American television network The WB during the 1999–2000 television season. In 2000, Mattel produced a Vitamin C doll which was retailed at approximately $16, and a Vitamin C lipstick shade was made by Tommy Hilfiger.

In late 2000, Vitamin C released "The Itch", the first single from her second album More. The song peaked on the Billboard Hot 100 at number 45. "The Itch" had more success in Australia where it peaked at number 6 on the ARIA Charts and was certified Platinum. That year, she played the role of Lucy Westerman in the horror film Dracula 2000 and appeared as herself in the spoof film Da Hip Hop Witch. More was released on January 31, 2001 and debuted at number 122 on the Billboard 200. "As Long As You're Loving Me" was released as the second single from the album, but failed to chart in the US. Subsequently, Vitamin C was dropped from Elektra Records.

In the February 2001 issue of Cosmopolitan magazine, Vitamin C was voted as one of the "Fun and Fearless Females" of the year. That same year Vitamin C was ranked No. 76 on the Maxim Hot 100 Women of 2001. The 2001 video game EA Sports Triple Play featured Vitamin C as an animated baseball player.

=== "Last Nite" and later activities ===
Vitamin C signed with V2 Records in 2001 and released the single "Last Nite" in July 2003. It was a cover version of the hit song by The Strokes and sampled Blondie's "Heart of Glass". The single peaked at number 70 on the UK Singles Chart.

In February 2005, Vitamin C's cover of "Kiss the Girl" was included on Disneymania 3; she also performed the song live at Disney's California Adventure which was recorded for its supplemental concert dvd. In July, her cover of "Voices Carry" by 'Til Tuesday was included on the soundtrack for the Disney movie Sky High. The same year, she wrote the song "We Are Gonna Happen" for Emma Roberts on the Unfabulous and More album.

In 2006, Fitzpatrick created a production company and worked with various pop singers such as Miley Cyrus. That year, she assembled a Radio Disney-aimed group of four teenagers named The Truth Squad. Vitamin C wrote and produced a number of song's for the group's debut album, which included a cover of "Graduation (Friends Forever)". The album was released on April 3, 2007, and made a brief appearance on the Top Kid Audio Chart, where it peaked at No. 23. During this time, Vitamin C was reportedly working on two new albums, a children's world-music album and a pop album, neither of which were released.

In 2008, she wrote the single "Make Some Noise" for Krystal Meyers. In 2009, she wrote "Let's Get Crazy" for Miley Cyrus as Hannah Montana. Vitamin C also wrote the song "One and the Same", a duet recorded by Demi Lovato and Selena Gomez for the Disney Channel Original Movie Princess Protection Program.

On March 21, 2012, Nickelodeon named Fitzpatrick as VP of Music. She oversaw all music for Nickelodeon and its sister cable channels. In 2016, she appeared as a featured artist on Information Society's cover of "Don't You Want Me"; her vocals on the release were recorded in 2001.

In 2019, she joined Netflix as an executive in charge of "music creative production, spectacle and events". In December 2020, Fitzpatrick released a rerecorded and rewritten version of "Graduation" titled "Graduation 2020 (Worst Year Ever)", with the lyrics changed to reflect on life during the COVID-19 pandemic.

== Personal life ==
Fitzpatrick married music composer and her former Eve's Plum bandmate Michael Kotch on October 8, 2004.

== Discography ==
Studio albums

- Vitamin C (1999)
- More (2001)

== Filmography ==
=== Film ===
| Year | Title | Role | Notes |
|---|---|---|---|
| 1988 | Hairspray | Amber Von Tussle | Credited as Colleen Fitzpatrick |
| 1995 | Higher Learning | Festival Singer | |
| 1997 | St. Patrick's Day | Cassie | Credited as Colleen Fitzpatrick |
| 1999 | My X-Girlfriend's Wedding Reception | Paprika | |
| 2000 | Da Hip Hop Witch | Herself | |
| 2000 | Dracula 2000 | Lucy Westerman | Credited as Colleen Fitzpatrick |
| 2001 | Get Over It | Herself | |
| 2001 | Scary Movie 2 | Herself (voice) | |
| 2001 | Rock Star | Guitarist in Crowd Outside Mansion | |
| 2005 | Happy Is Not Hard to Be | Chloe | Credited as Colleen Fitzpatrick |
| 2007 | Along the Way | Elizabeth McCaffrey | Credited as Colleen Fitzpatrick |

=== Television ===
| Year | Title | Role | Notes |
|---|---|---|---|
| 1988 | The Equalizer | Susan | Episode: "Last Call" |
| 1988 | The Equalizer | Beverly Heat | Episode: "Eighteen with a Bullet" |
| 2000 | The Amanda Show | Herself | 2 episodes |
| 2001 | Turn Ben Stein On | Herself | 1 episodes |
| 2001 | The Brothers Garcia | Herself | 1 episodes |
| 2001 | MADTv | Herself | 2 episodes |
| 2001 | Hollywood Squares | Herself | 12 episodes |
| 2002 | Celebrity Bootcamp | Herself | Television film |
| 2002 | Sabrina the Teenage Witch | Cathy Winters | 1 episode |
| 2002 | Haunted | Bliss | 1 episode |
| 2004 | The WB's Superstar USA | Herself | Regular panelist |
| 2008 | Your Mama Don't Dance | Herself | Regular panelist |
