= Che'Nelle discography =

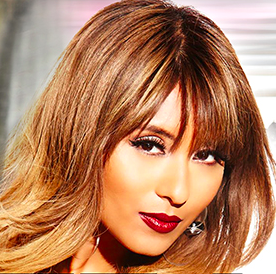
- Che'Nelle in 2016
- Studio albums: 7
- Extended plays: 4
- Compilation albums: 2
- Singles: 30
- Promotional singles: 5
- As featured artist: 33
- Cover albums: 2
- Mixtapes: 1

The discography of Malaysian-born Australian singer Che'Nelle consists of seven studio albums, two cover albums, four extended plays (EP), two compilation albums, one mixtape, and numerous solo and collaboration singles. Signing with Virgin America Music in 2005 after being discovered by Charles Dixon, Che'Nelle released her debut studio album, Things Happen for a Reason (2007). Although the album was a commercial failure in the United States, it saw success in Japan, charting in the top ten of the Oricon Albums Chart. She later was nominated for and won the Japan Gold Disc Award for Top New Artist. Following this, Che'Nelle re-located to Japan and signed with EMI Music Japan. Her second studio album, Feel Good (2010), saw moderate success, peaking at number 41 on the Oricon charts.

In 2011, Che'Nelle released an English cover of Japanese singer Tee's song "Baby I Love U", becoming one of her most successful songs in Japan. Her cover of "Baby I Love U" peaked at number 21 on the Billboard Japan Hot 100 and ranked number one on Recochoku, a ringtone download market. The song later was certified 2× Platinum by the Recording Industry Association of Japan (RIAJ) in both ringtone and PC download sales. The song later went on to revitalize the sales of Che'Nelle's cover album, Luv Songs (2011), which featured both English and Japanese songs. The album became a commercial success, peaking at number 3 on the Oricon charts and receiving a Platinum certification from the RIAJ. Her third studio album, Believe (2012), saw similar success, peaking at number two. The song "Believe", which served as the second single from the album of the same name became commercially successful in Japan, peaking at number 5 on the Billboard Japan Hot 100 and receiving multiple accolades at the 2013 Japan Gold Disc Awards. Following the Universal Music Group acquiring EMI's music operations, Che'Nelle along with all other former EMI Music Japan artists were transferred to the EMI Records Japan label. She released her third studio album, Aishiteru (2013), which peaked at number two. Later that year, Feel Good and Luv Songs were reissued by Universal Music Japan. A greatest hits album, Best Songs (2013), was also released by Universal Japan near the end of 2013, peaking at number 4. The compilation featured songs with Tee, Leo and Ai, as well as songs from Che'Nelle's debut album.

In 2014, Che'Nelle transferred to Delicious Deli Records, which operated under Universal Japan's international division. She released her second cover album, Luv Songs 2 (2014), under the label. The album became her second album to not chart in the top ten of the Oricon Albums chart, peaking at number 12. In 2014, Che'Nelle released the single "Happiness". Although the physical single peaked at number 25 on the Oricon Singles Chart, "Happiness" became Che'Nelle's highest charting song on the Japan Hot 100, peaking at number 2. The song later served as the lead single for her fifth studio album, @Chenelleworld (2015). Within that year, Che'Nelle released a cover of Adele's "Hello" independently outside of Japan.

In 2017, Che'Nelle released the single "Destiny". The song served as the theme song for the Japanese drama Reverse. The song peaked at number 36 on the Oricon Singles Chart and number 4 on the Japan Hot 100, receiving a Platinum download certification from the RIAJ. The song served as the lead single for the album of the same name, which was released shortly after. Destiny (2017), which served as Che'Nelle's sixth studio album, peaked at number 9 on the Billboard Japan Hot Albums chart and number 10 on the Oricon charts. Three months later, Che'Nelle released her seventh studio album, Metamorphosis (2017). The album was released in celebration of Che'Nelle's tenth anniversary of her debut. Metamorphosis became Che'Nelle's lowest charting album, peaking at 93 on the Oricon charts. With the release of Metamorphosis, Che'Nelle completed her multi-record deal with Universal Japan. Near the end of 2017, Che'Nelle independently released an EP, Calm Before the Storm. The EP was released exclusively outside of Asia. In December 2017, Universal Japan released Che'Nelle's second greatest hits album, 10th Anniversary All Time Best.

== Albums ==
=== Studio albums ===
List of studio albums, with selected chart positions and certifications
Title	Album details	Peak chart positions			Certifications
Title	Album details	FRA	JPN	JPN Hot	Certifications
Things Happen for a Reason	Released: 22 August 2007; Label: Capitol; Formats: CD, digital download, streaming	174	12	—	RIAJ: Gold
Feel Good	Released: 10 February 2010 (JPN); Label: EMI Music Japan; Formats: CD, digital download, streaming	—	41	—	
Believe	Released: 4 July 2012; Label: EMI Music Japan; Formats: CD, digital download, streaming	—	3	—	RIAJ: Platinum
Aishiteru	Released: 7 August 2013; Label: EMI Records Japan; Formats: CD, digital download, streaming	—	2	—	RIAJ: Gold
@Chenelleworld	Released: 11 February 2015; Label: Delicious Deli; Formats: CD, digital download, streaming	—	6	—	
Destiny	Released: 14 June 2017 (JPN); Label: Virgin; Formats: CD, digital download, streaming	—	10	10	
Metamorphosis	Released: 6 September 2017 (JPN); Label: Virgin; Formats: CD, digital download, streaming	—	92	—	
"—" denotes items which were released before the creation of the Japan Hot Album charts, or items that did not chart.

=== Compilation albums ===
List of compilation albums, with selected chart positions and certifications
Title	Album details	Peak chart positions		Certifications
Title	Album details	JPN	JPN Hot	Certifications
Best Songs	Released: 4 December 2013 (JPN); Label: Universal International; Formats: CD, digital download, streaming	4	—	RIAJ: Gold
10th Anniversary All Time Best	Released: 6 December 2017 (JPN); Label: Virgin; Formats: CD, digital download, streaming	21	16	
"—" denotes items which were released before the creation of the Japan Hot Album charts.

=== Cover albums ===
List of cover albums, with selected chart positions and certifications
Title	Album details	Peak chart positions	Certifications
Title	Album details	JPN	Certifications
Luv Songs	Released: 20 July 2011; Label: EMI Music Japan; Formats: CD, digital download, streaming	3	RIAJ: Platinum
Luv Songs 2	Released: 4 June 2014; Label: Delicious Deli; Formats: CD, digital download, streaming	12	

== Extended plays ==
List of extended plays
Title	EP details
Touch (Close to You)	Released: 14 November 2012 (JPN); Label: EMI Music Japan; Formats: Digital download, streaming
You & I (with Shifta)	Released: 24 October 2016; Label: Timeless Entertainment; Formats: Digital download, streaming
Calm Before the Storm	Released: 4 July 2012; Label: Self-released; Formats: Digital download, streaming
Holiday Party	Released: 7 December 2018; Label: Virgin, Self-released; Formats: Digital download, streaming

== Mixtapes ==
List of mixtapes
Title	Album details
Revolution	Released: 9 June 2014 (JPN); Label: Unknown; Formats: Digital download

== Singles ==
=== As a lead artist ===
List of singles as lead artist, with selected chart positions and certifications, showing year released and album name
Title	Year	Peak chart positions			Certifications	Album
Title	Year	AUS	JPN	JPN Hot	Certifications	Album
"I Fell in Love with the DJ"	2007	62	—	—		Things Happen for a Reason
"Hurry Up"	2007	—	—	—		Things Happen for a Reason
"First Love" (featuring Lecca)	2008	—	—	—		Feel Good
"Feel Good"	2010	—	—	23		Feel Good
"Missing"	2010	—	—	—		Feel Good & Luv Songs
"Sakura"	2011	—	—	84		Luv Songs
"So Sick"	2011	—	—	—		Luv Songs
"Baby I Love U"	2011	—	—	21	RIAJ (ringtone): 2× Platinum; RIAJ (PC download): 2× Platinum	Luv Songs
"Story"	2012	—	15	30	RIAJ (PC download): Gold	Believe
"Believe"	2012	—	—	5	RIAJ (digital): Million; RIAJ (ringtone): Platinum; RIAJ (PC download): 2× Platinum	Believe
"Fall in Love"	2012	—	—	77		Touch (Close to You)
"Touch (Close to You)"	2012	—	—	79		Touch (Close To You) & Aishiteru
"I Will"	2013	—	—	36		Aishiteru
"It's Happening Again"	2013	—	—	—		Revolution & Believe
"Burning Love"	2013	—	—	9		Aishiteru
"Aishiteru"	2013	—	—	—		Aishiteru
"Zutto"	2014	—	—	12		Luv Songs 2
"Happiness"	2014	—	25	2	RIAJ (digital): 2× Platinum; RIAJ (streaming): Platinum	@Chenelleworld
"Always Love U"	2014	—	—	87		@Chenelleworld
"Fierce"	2015	—	—	—		@Chenelleworld
"Hello"	2015	—	—	—		Non-album single
"Strut"	2016	—	—	—		@Chenelleworld
"Destiny"	2017	—	36	4	RIAJ (digital): Platinum	Destiny
"Love You Like Me"	2017	—	—	—		Metamorphosis
"Liquor Story"	2017	—	—	—		Metamorphosis
"Hand It Over"	2020	—	—	—		Metamorphosis
"1 Shot 2 Shots"	2020	—	—	—		Non-album singles
"Invincible"	2020	—	—	—		Non-album singles
"I Am"	2023	—	—	—		Non-album singles
"SOS"	2024	—	—	—		Non-album singles
"Everybody"	2025	—	—	— (Note: "Everybody" did not enter the Billboard Japan Hot 100 chart, but peaked at number 4 on the Billboard Japan Hot Overseas chart.)		Non-album singles
"—" denotes items that did not chart or items that were ineligible to chart because no physical edition was released.

=== As a featured artist ===
List of singles as featured artist, showing year released and album name
Title	Year	Album
"Young Boy"	2005	Throwaway Rhymes Pt. II
"Before"	2005	Throwaway Rhymes Pt. II
"Somebody's Gotta"	2007	Powerful Music, Vol. 2
"I'm Still Here"	2007	Powerful Music, Vol. 3
"Sugar"	2008	Crucial
"Scrambalen"	2008	Crucial
"Hold on Me"	2009	The Legacy
"Wish You Were Here"	2009	Sugar & Spice
"Tight"	2009	Non-album single
"III Woman"	2009	Non-album single
"Soul Life"	2009	Non-album single
"Hands On"	2009	Non-album single
"Postcard"	2009	City of My Heart
"Ohh Yeah (Reggae)"	2010	Non-album single
"Streets"	2010	Non-album single
"Here on Earth"	2011	Heart of a Lion
"Sunadokei"	2011	In The Moment
"Girls"	2011	In The Moment
"No Tears Left"	2012	Non-album single
"The Last Word"	2012	Non-album single
"Spend a Little Time"	2012	Eyes on the Prize
"Till It's Done"	2012	Non-album single
"Thank You"	2013	Non-album single
"Titanium"	2013	Nothing But the Beat 2.0 (Japanese Edition)
"After the Storm"	2013	Moriagaro
"Be Right There"	2013	Building Bridges
"Happy Tears"	2014	Shibuya Shunai Monogatari
"Do You Wanna"	2014	Non-album single
"Last Forever"	2015	Shunkashuto
"Numb"	2018	Non-album single
"Saigo no Piece"	2019	Tokyo Heart Beats
"Northern Lights"	2020	Non-album single

=== Promotional singles ===
List of promotional singles
Title	Year	Album
"Sukidayo (Hyakkai no Koukai)	2014	Luv Songs 2
"Kimi ni Okudaru Uta (Song for You)"	2015	@Chenelleworld
"Love Sick"	2017	Destiny
"Kimi ga Ireba"	2017	Destiny
"Kiseki"	2017	10th Anniversary

== Other appearances ==
List of non-studio album or guest appearances that feature Che'Nelle, that were not released as singles or promotional singles
Title	Year	Album
"Hooked Up"	2007	Dear Summer, Vol. 2
"Somethin' 'Bout A Saturday"	2011	Elle: A Modern Cinderella Tale Soundtrack
