= Feel Good (Che'Nelle album) =

Studio album by Che'Nelle
- Released: 10 February 2010
- Recorded: 2008–09
- Genres: Dancehall, hip hop, R&B, reggae fusion
- Length: 56:57
- Label: EMI Music Japan

Che'Nelle chronology
Things Happen for a Reason (2007)	Feel Good (2010)	Luv Songs (2011)

Singles from Feel Good
- 1. "Feel Good" Released: January 2010; 2. "Missing" Released: 2010

Feel Good is the second studio album by Malaysian-Australian recording artist Che'Nelle. It was first released on 10 February 2010 by EMI Music Japan. It is a follow-up to her internationally released debut album Things Happen for a Reason (2007). The singer's manager Sir Charles Dixon served as the album's executive producer. "Feel Good" contains songs that were written by Che'Nelle herself and features production from Jason Gill, Toshinobu Kubota and The Insomniax. The album features collaborations with Jamaican artist Shaggy, the American singer Colby O'Donis and Japanese act Lecca. Two songs originally featured on her debut made it onto the album. It received a physical CD release solely in Japan and charted at number forty-one on the Japan Oricon album chart.

== Background and promotion ==
Che'Nelle received a writing credit on eleven of the fifteen tracks featured on the "Feel Good". American singer Colby O'Donis features on the song "Razor". He also wrote and produced the song. Shaggy collaborated with her for the track "Running A Muck" and was produced by Tony "CD" Kelly. The song "First Love" from her special edition release of her debut album was included on the album. It also contains a remixed version featuring Japanese singer Lecca. Che'Nelle worked with production duo The Insomniax on a number of songs featured on the album. The album was exclusively produced by Sir Charles Dixon and Che'Nelle herself served as the project's associate producer. Chris Wami was in charge of the "Feel Good's" promotion work. The final mastering for the album was done by Tom Coyne at Sterling Sound in New York City. The final three songs on the tracklist were marketed as bonus tracks.

The album's release was announced in January 2010. The album entered the Japan Oricon album chart at number forty-one, on the week ending 14 February 2010. This remained its highest position and spent a total of nine weeks in the chart.

The first single from the album is its title track "Feel Good". It was written by Che'Nelle, Jason Gill and The Insomniax, then produced by the latter. The song's lyrics features her often used opening shout-out of "Che'Nelle got a story for ya". A promotional CD for the song was released via EMI music Japan. A music video for "Feel Good" was released in early 2010.

"Missing" was marketed as the album's second single. A music video was later released to promote the song. The song was later included on Che'Nelle's third studio album Luv Songs.

== Track listing ==
Japanese Edition

No.	Title	Writer(s)	Producer(s)	Length
1.	"Feel Good"	Cheryline Lim; Jason Gill; Charles Dixon; Emile Ghantous; Gregg Pagani	Gill	3:34
2.	"Sunshine"	Lim; Gill; Kirsten Ashley Cole	Gill	3:15
3.	"First Love"	Lim; Chris Robinson	Robinson	4:20
4.	"Pretty Boy"	Lim; Pagani; Ghantous	Pagani	3:30
5.	"Eliminated"	Lim; Cole; Ghantous; Erik Nelson	Insomniax	3:23
6.	"Missing"	Toshinobu Kubota	The Ratt Pakk	4:21
7.	"Tear Jerker"	Frederik Nordsø Schjoldan; Fridolin Nordsø Schjoldan; Edwin Serrano; Lateasha Morrow	Frederik & Fridolin	4:02
8.	"Running A Muck" (featuring Shaggy)	Lim; Shaggy; Anthony Kelly; Leroy Romans; Lionel Anthony; Brian Stanley	Tony "CD" Kelly	4:27
9.	"Headphones"	Lim; Ghantous; Nelson	Insomniax	3:53
10.	"Venus & Mars"	Lim; Ghantous; Nelson	Insomniax	4:00
11.	"Razor" (featuring Colby O'Donis)	Colby O'Donis	O'Donis	3:21
12.	"See Thru"	Lim; Matt Friedman	Friedman	3:21
13.	"I Fell in Love with the DJ" (Ruff Diamond Remix)	Lim; R. Kelly; Bryan O'Neil	Robinson	4:00
14.	"First Love" (featuring Lecca)	Lim; Robinson	Robinson	4:20
15.	"Missing" (House Version)	Kubota; Joe Lamont	The Ratt Pakk; Takeshi Nakagawa	5:00

== Personnel ==
Credits adapted from the liner notes of Feel Good.

- Lionel Anthony - writer
- Orville Burrell - vocals, writer
- Kirsten Ashley Cole - writer
- Cham - vocals
- Che'Nelle - associate producer, lead vocals
- Tom Coyne - mixing
- Charles Dixon - executive producer
- Matt Friedman - writer, producer, mixing
- Emile Ghantous - writer, producer, mixing
- Tia L Gilford - legal
- Jason Gill - writer, producer, mixing
- Dominic Glover - trumpet
- Jay Glover - mixing
- Jam & Yuki - hair and make-up
- Yuji Kamijo - mixing
- Anthony Kelly - writer, producer
- R. Kelly - writer
- Asuka Kito - styling
- Toshinobu Kubota - writer
- Joe Lamont - writer
- Lecca - vocals, writer
- Latesha Morrow - writer
- Takeshi Nakagawa - mixing
- Erik Nelson - writer, producer, mixing, guitar and bass
- Colby O'Donis - vocals, writer, producer, mixing
- Bryan O'Neil - writer
- Gregg Pagani - writer, producer, mixing
- Chris Robinson - writer, producer, mixing
- Leroy Romans - writer
- Frederik Nordsø Schjoldan - writer, producer
- Fridolin Nordsø Schjoldan - writer, producer
- Kazuaki Seki - photography
- Eddie Edwin Serrano - writer
- Brian Stanley - writer, mixing
- Chris Wami - promotion

== Chart positions ==
Chart	Peak position
Japanese Albums (Oricon)	41

== Release history ==
Country	Date	Format
Japan	10 February 2010	CD
