= Ghetto Story (song) =

2006 Single by Cham featuring Alicia Keys

Single by Cham featuring Alicia Keys

from the album Ghetto Story
- Released: 28 June 2006
- Recorded: 6 June 2006
- Studio: Boxx Studios (Kingston, Jamaica)
- Genre: Dancehall; reggae fusion
- Length: 4:17 (original version); 4:25 (with Akon); 4:42 (Remix with Alicia Keys and Akon)
- Label: Madhouse; Atlantic; Asylum
- Songwriters: Dameon Beckett; Alicia Keys; Aliaune Thiam
- Producer: Dave Kelly

Cham singles chronology
"Vitamin S" (2005)	"Ghetto Story" (2006)	"Rude Boy Pledge" (2006)

Alicia Keys singles chronology
"Don't Give Up (Africa)" (2005)	"Ghetto Story" (2006)	"No One" (2007)

"Ghetto Story" is a dancehall/ragga single performed by dancehall artist Baby Cham. It is the first single to be released from his album of the same name. The song is most known for its reggae fusion remix called "Ghetto Story Chapter 2" featuring American R&B singer Alicia Keys. The single peaked at number 77 on the Billboard Hot 100, number 15 on Billboard's Hot R&B/Hip-Hop Singles chart, and number 13 on the Billboard Rap Tracks chart. It received heavy airplay on MTV2 and BET, and some airplay on Canada's MuchMusic. The song is about growing up in the ghetto and how it was for Cham in his younger years. The video entered BET's 106 & Park at number 9 before peaking at number 5, making it one of the very few reggae videos to reach the top 5 on that countdown. Another remix features singer Akon. Rapper Lil Wayne has freestyled over the instrumental.

== Song information ==
Here's my ghetto story. Been in hell through the fire, now gonna take it higher. Here's my survival story. So many reasons to sing now, plus now we got the keys to the kingdom.

These are the lyrics to the intro sung by Alicia Keys. The overall feel of the song is rage and celebration that the two have made it out of the ghetto and out of their early struggles.

The lyrics are very informative as Cham and Alicia Keys explain how it felt to live in the ghetto. Cham says A lot of people like the song for its lyrics and overall feel of the song. These are the first two lines in Cham's opening verse:

I remember those days when Hell was my home. And me and Mama bed was a big piece of foam.

In the official remix, which also includes singer Akon, he explains his way of living in the ghetto, and how he made it, the lines in his opening verse:

See I was poor like many men, and didn't have nothin'. Came to America, trying to make somethin' out of somethin'. See we Africans we like hunting. Found my way up to the top like it wasn't nothin.

The song uses the "Eighty Five" riddim.

== Music video ==
A music video was filmed for Chapter 2 featuring Alicia Keys. It was shot in Jamaica by Sanaa Hamri. It shows the storyline of the lyrics and what it was like for Cham and Alicia Keys to live in a ghetto area. The unofficial video was put on MTV in late March. The video premiered on BET's 106 & Park on 8 August 2006 and entered the countdown three weeks later to debut at number nine and stay there for four days in a row. Eventually it peaked at number five.

== Track listings ==
- CD 1
1. "Ghetto Story Chapter 2" (featuring Alicia Keys) (Dameon Beckett, Dave Kelly, Alicia Keys) – 4:46
2. "Hood" (Dameon Beckett, Dave Kelly) – 4:30
- CD 2
1. "Ghetto Story Chapter 2" (featuring Alicia Keys) (Dameon Beckett, Dave Kelly, Alicia Keys) – 4:46
2. "Ghetto Story" (album version) (Dameon Beckett, Dave Kelly) – 4:12
3. "Hood" (Dameon Beckett, Dave Kelly) – 7:01
4. "Mytone" (CD-ROM track)

== Versions ==
- "Ghetto Story Chapter 1" (Cham)
- "Ghetto Story Chapter 2" (Cham featuring Alicia Keys)
- "Ghetto Story Chapter 3" (Cham featuring Akon)
- "Ghetto Story Chapter 4" (Cham featuring Alicia Keys and Akon)

== Charts ==
=== Weekly charts ===
Chart (2006)	Peak position
UK Singles (Official Charts)	62
UK Hip Hop/R&B (Official Charts)	11
US Billboard Hot 100	77
US Hot R&B/Hip-Hop Songs (Billboard)	15
US Hot Rap Songs (Billboard)	13

=== Year-end charts ===
Chart (2006)	Position
US Hot R&B/Hip-Hop Songs (Billboard)	63
