= Too Hype =

Studio album by Tanya Stephens
- Released: November 25, 1997
- Recorded: 1996
- Genre: Dancehall; Reggae
- Length: 38:02
- Label: VP/Madhouse Records
- Producer: Dave Kelly, Patrick Roberts, Barry O'Hare, Delroy Collins

Tanya Stephens chronology
Big Tings Ah Gwaan (1994)	Too Hype (1997)	Work Out (1997)

Too Hype is the second studio album released by Tanya Stephens on November 25, 1997, on the VP Records/Madhouse Records label. The album is notable as it contains the "Yu Nuh Ready fi Dis Yet" track from the 1997 Reggae Gold album.

== Track listing ==
All lyrics are written by V. Stephenson.

No.	Title	Length
1.	"Yu Nuh Ready Fi Dis Yet"	3:30
2.	"Too Hype"	3:04
3.	"Goggle"	2:56
4.	"Mi and Mi God"	3:43
5.	"Nuff Man Flop"	3:29
6.	"Better Work"	3:19
7.	"Big Heavy Gal"	3:46
8.	"Friends"	3:48
9.	"Hang Ups"	3:35
10.	"Big Tings Ah Gwaan"	3:28
11.	"Good Man" (featuring Don Yute)	3:24
Total length:		38:02
