= Things Happen for a Reason =

Studio album by Che'Nelle
- Released: 22 August 2007
- Recorded: 2006–2007
- Length: 55:16
- Label: Capitol

Che'Nelle chronology
Things Happen for a Reason (2007)	Feel Good (2010)

Singles from Things Happen for a Reason
- 1. "I Fell in Love with the DJ" Released: 2007; 2. "Hurry Up" Released: 2008; 3. "First Love" Released: 2008

Alternative covers
- Japan edition cover

Alternative cover
- Special edition cover

Things Happen for a Reason is the debut studio album by Malaysian-Australian singer Che'Nelle. It was first released on 22 August 2007, Japan via EMI Music Japan. An international release followed on 5 September 2007 by Capitol Records. It was her first commercial release after signing with the Capitol Music Group CEO Jason Flom. Sir Charles Dixon served as the album's executive producer, after he discovered Che'Nelle's music online and helped to secure her record deal. The album features productions from James Poyser, Oak Felder, Sean Garrett, Kara DioGuardi and Rich Harrison and The Lab Ratz. Che'Nelle either wrote or co-wrote the entire album. The album was largely mixed by Andrew Dawson. Three songs featured on "Things Happen for a Reason" sample songs performed by other artists.

"I Fell in Love with the DJ" was released as the first single from the album. It charts in various European countries including France. The second single from "Things Happen for a Reason" is "Hurry Up" and rapper Tinchy Stryder was featured on the song for its release in the United Kingdom. A special edition of the album was released in Japan one year after its original release and also features a new song, "First Love", which served as the final single from the project. It also contains remixes of her debut single. The album charted highest in Japan on the Billboard and Oricon album charts. The album was certified gold by RIAJ, having sold in excess of 100,000 copies in Japan by June 2008.

== Background and production ==
Che'Nelle recorded various demos which were uploaded online via the social networking website MySpace and these were shared across music forums. The artist's work then came to the attention of record producers. It was record promoter Sir Charles Dixon who originally signed Che'Nelle to his production company, SCIP records in 2005. Dixon later contacted Steve Tramposch who worked at Virgin records and he arranged a meeting with his CEO Jason Flom. In February 2006, Flom signed Che'Nelle and the album was put into production. In addition Dixon helped secure a Japanese release of the album by the record label EMI Music Japan.

As Che'Nelle wrote many of the lyrics featured on the album she gained much creative control. She told Aiko Ishikawa of Tower Records that she wanted to create cheeky lyrics, that would cheer up her female audience and also surprise her male listeners. Though various producers contributed to the album, Che'Nelle wanted to create a distinct and unique sound to identify her with. She told Ishikawa that she envisioned people saying "Oh, that's a Che'Nelle song" upon hearing her music. At the time, Dixon said that Che'Nelle was able to adapt to any song given to her during production. He added that it made her a "universal artist". The song "Mantaker" samples the 1978 song "Holy Ghost" performed by The Bar-Kays. "I Fell in Love with the DJ" samples "Reggae Bump Bump" recorded by American singer R. Kelly in 2005. The Blues Magoos' song "Can't Get Enough of You" was sampled in the song titled "Summer Jam".

Che'Nelle either wrote or co-wrote each song on "Things Happen for a Reason". It also features writing and production from Derek Brin, Oak Felder, James Poyser, Sean Garrett, Kara DioGuardi, Rich Harrison, Dwayne Lindsey and The Lab Ratz. The songs featured on the album were recorded at various studio locations in the US. Some were recorded at Sony Studios in New York City while others at "House of Che'Nelle" at Edgewater, New Jersey. Those written and produced by Garrett and Felder were carried out at Soapbox Studios and Silent Studios based in Atlanta. Che'Nelle also recorded the song "Pops Up" with Rich Harrison. The track was originally recorded by Janet Jackson but was not included on the album. Sir Charles Dixon served as the album's executive producer and is credited as such on the album liner notes.

== Promotion ==
The album was first released in Japan on 20 August 2007 and it peaked at number twelve on the Japan Oricon album chart and remained in the top 100 for sixteen weeks. It peaked at number six on the album chart compiled by Billboard. A special addition of the album featuring remixes and a new song was released on 20 August 2008, which entered the Oricon album chart at number ninety-five and spent four weeks on the chart. The album track "Teach Me How To Dance" was featured in the 2006 film Take the Lead. The track was also featured on the soundtrack for the 2008 movie Make It Happen. In June 2008, the album had sold more than 100,000 copies in Japan and was certified gold by RIAJ.

"I Fell in Love with the DJ" was released as the first single from the album. It was remixed to feature the Jamaican rapper Cham ahead of its release. It peaked at number thirty on the French SNEP chart. Che'Nelle embarked on a US radio tour and visited forty states to promote the single. When the tour came to an end she was informed that the song was not performing well on US radio. Che'Nelle was upset but decided to refocus her attention on the release of "Things Happen for a Reason" in Japan and Europe. The song began to rise in popularity in Japan and she traveled to the country to promote it further. The singer has credited these events for helping her to launch a long-standing career in the country.

"Hurry Up" was the second single from the album. In the UK an official remix was recorded featuring Tinchy Stryder and was sent to national Radio in December 2007.

"First Love" was released as the album's third and final single in Japan. The song only appeared on the album special edition re-release of "Things Happen for a Reason". It was later included on her on her sophomore album titled "Feel Good", alongside an official remix of the song featuring Lecca. The latter charted at number fifty-one in Japan.

== Critical reception ==
Leslie Wilson from Gulf News said that Che'Nelle followed a successful "formula" used by artists such as Beyonce and Christina Aguilera, in which their albums have "attitude". She opined that "there are several songs which have hit written all over them but not many really hit home." She singled out the songs "Club Jumpin'", "Teach Me How to Dance" and "Hurry Up" as potential "summer hits", but felt their "near-identical beat" became repetitive. She observed some "first-rate beats and catchy hooks" but concluded that "Things Happen for a Reason" is a "faceless and at times lacks personality." A reviewer for the Independent Online gave the album a one star rating. They branded it as "excruciating listening" and difficult to define its genre. They accused her of impersonating Shabba Ranks and were shocked that Capitol records even released it. They praised Che'Nelle's vocals on the songs "Right Back" and "Mantaker" but believed she failed to resuscitate ragga music.

Tomoe Sato from Tower Records described it as a collection of colorful tracks "refreshing" dance hall, reggae and reggaeton "flavors". They also praised Che'Nelle's vocal skill on the album. Melody L. Goh from the Malay news outlet The Star said that the album is a formation of "14 dancehall-inspired tracks." Angie Romero from Vibe praised Che'Nelle's work. She opined that "I Fell In Love With the DJ" is a "soca-licious" track and "2nd Nature" has "soft spoken inflections" that are reminiscent of Aaliyah's work. A writer from the Bajan Reporter branded the album as a "satisfying combination of compulsive rhythmic music and soul-deep, intimate ballads." They added it gave her "major new singer-songwriter" status.

== Track listing ==
Things Happen for a Reason track listing
No.	Title	Writer(s)	Producer(s)	Length
1.	"I Fell in Love with the DJ"	Cheryline Lim; Robert Kelly; Bryan O'Neil	Lim; Marcus Bell	3:28
2.	"Club Jumpin'"	Lim; Derek Brin	Brin	3:49
3.	"Teach Me How to Dance"	Lim; Shawn Campbell; Marshall Leathers	The Arkitects	3:28
4.	"Hurry Up"	Sean Garrett; Warren Felder	Garrett; Felder	3:08
5.	"Right Back"	Lim; James Poyser; Kara DioGuardi; Zukhan Bey	Poyser; DioGuardi; Bey	4:05
6.	"Mantaker"	Lim; Eric Tommy; Cornelius Church; Kairi Gwinn; James Banks; Eddie Marion; Henderson Thigpen	The Lab Ratz; Tommy	3:46
7.	"When We Will Meet Again"	Lim; Chris Robinson	Robinson	4:26
8.	"Lookin'"	Garrett; Felder	Garrett; Felder	3:07
9.	"Stick with Me"	Lim; Bell	Bell	3:47
10.	"Summer Jam"	Lim; Charles Dixon; Jens Lomholt; P. Jones; Eric Kaz	The Copenhaniacs	3:22
11.	"My Pledge"	Lim; Robinson	Robinson	4:48
12.	"2nd Nature"	Lim; Rahmat Laver	Rami Barz	4:26
13.	"I Can't Make You Love Me – Interlude"	Lim	Lim	1:06
14.	"I Fell in Love with the DJ (Remix)" (featuring Cham)	Lim; Damian Beckett; D. Kelly; Kelly; O'Neil	Brin	4:00
15.	"Outro / Sprung On My Booty Call"	Lim; Dwayne "Whateva "Lindsey	Lim; Lindsey	4:30
Total length:				55:16

Japan edition
No.	Title	Writer(s)	Producer(s)	Length
15.	"I Guess"	Lim; Bell	Bell	3:11
16.	"Certain Things"	Lim; Nick Gale	Gale	5:05
Total length:				63:32

Japan special edition
No.	Title	Writer(s)	Producer(s)	Length
1.	"First Love"	Lim; Robinson	Robinson	4:22
18.	"I Fell in Love with the DJ" (live with DJ Kaori)	Lim; Kelly; O'Neil	Lim; Bell	3:28
19.	"I Fell in Love with the DJ" (WAWA Vocal Mix)	Lim; Kelly; O'Neil	Lim; Bell; WAWA	3:28
Total length:				74:50

== Personnel ==
- Cham – featured artist, writer
- James Banks – writer
- Marcus Bell – writer, producer
- Zukhan Bey – writer, producer
- Derek Brin – writer
- Shawn Campbell – writer
- Esteban Carvallo – guitar
- Che'Nelle – writer, producer, primary artist
- Cornelius Church – writer, producer
- Andrew Dawson – mixing
- Kara DioGuardi – writer, producer
- Charles Dixon – executive producer, writer
- Bill Esses – mixing
- Warren Felder – writer, producer
- Sean Garrett – writer, producer
- Kairi Gwinn – writer, producer
- P. Jones – writer
- Eric Kaz – writer
- Dave Kelly – writer, additional recording
- R. Kelly – writer
- Rahmat Laver – writer
- Marshall Leathers – writer
- Dwayne "Whateva" Lindsey – writer, producer
- Jens Lomholt – writer
- Eddie Marion – writer
- Vernon J Mungo – recording
- Bryan O'Neil – writer
- James Poyser – writer, producer
- Chris Robinson – writer, producer
- Phil Tan – mixing
- The Arkitects – producer
- Henderson Thigpen – writer
- Eric Tommy – writer, producer

== Chart positions ==
Chart performance for Things Happen for a Reason
Chart	Peak position
French Albums (SNEP)	174
Japanese Albums (Billboard)	6
Japanese Albums (Oricon)	12

== Certifications ==
Certifications for Things Happen for a Reason
Region	Certification	Certified units/sales
Japan (RIAJ)	Gold	100,000

== Release history ==
Release history and formats for Things Happen for a Reason
Country	Date	Format
Japan	20 August 2007	CD
Australia	5 September 2007	Digital download
United States	5 September 2007	Digital download
United States	5 September 2007	CD
Australia	October 2007	CD
Japan	20 August 2008	CD, special edition
