= Ruff Rider =

Studio album by Tanya Stephens
- Released: April 14, 1998
- Recorded: 1997
- Genre: Dancehall, Ragga, Reggae
- Length: 55:53
- Label: VP/Madhouse Records
- Producer: Dave Kelly, Andrew Henton, Barry O'Hare

Tanya Stephens chronology
Work Out (1997)	Ruff Rider (1998)	Sintoxicated (2001)

Ruff Rider is the 3rd studio album by Jamaican recording artiste Tanya Stephens. This album is best known for the hit single "Handle the Ride".

== Track listing ==
All lyrics are written by V. Stephenson.

No.	Title	Length
1.	"Draw Fi Mi Finger" (samples "Heads High" by Mr. Vegas)	3:36
2.	"Handle the Ride"	3:23
3.	"Part Time Lover"	3:53
4.	"Man Ah Fraction" (Interlude)	0:24
5.	"Big Ninja Bike"	3:40
6.	"Crawl & Bawl" (featuring Bounty Killer)	3:49
7.	"Wuk Fi Gawn"	3:59
8.	"1-1-9"	3:37
9.	"Joe Grind"	2:58
10.	"Think It Over"	3:45
11.	"Something Blue"	3:50
12.	"2000 Years"	3:41
13.	"Dedicated"	3:56
14.	"Man Fi Rule"	3:45
15.	"#2" (bonus track, a.k.a. "No. 2" or "Number 2")	3:46
16.	"Horny" (bonus track)	3:51
