= Wow... The Story =

Studio album by Baby Cham
- Released: 24 October 2000 (US)
- Recorded: 1999–2000
- Genre: Dancehall, ragga
- Length: 77:50
- Label: Artist Only/Madhouse Records
- Producer: Dave Kelly; Tony Kelly

Baby Cham chronology
Wow... The Story (2000)	Ghetto Story (2006)

Wow... The Story is a double album by Baby Cham, released on 24 October 2000, (see 2000 in music) and referred to by the Miami New Times as "the most anticipated album in years from any reggae artist.". The album serves as an introduction to Baby Cham, one of Jamaica's dancehall artists. The first disc has previously released titles while disc two has new material. Disc one includes "The Mass" and "Funny Man", as well as the popular hits such as "Ghetto Pledge" and "Can I get A". On disc two, Cham moves away from the traditional dancehall. This disc includes "High Roller", where Cham collaborates with the dancehall artist Shaggy.

== Disc one ==
#	Title	Producer(s)	Featured guest(s)	Composer(s)	Time
1	"The Mass"	Dave Kelly		Charles, V.W./Kelly, D.	2:43
2	"Many Many"	Dave Kelly		Charles, V.W./Kelly, D./Beckett, D.	2:44
3	"Que Sera/Hottie Hottie Crew"	Dave Kelly		Kelly, D./Beckett, D.	4:38
4	"Funny Man"	Dave Kelly	Mr. Easy	Kelly, D.	3:34
5	"Gallang Yah Gal/We No Sorry"	Dave Kelly		Kelly, D.	4:27
6	"Boom/Can I Get A"	Dave Kelly		Kelly, D./Beckett, D.	4:27
7	"Boom Tune"	Dave Kelly		Kelly, D./Beckett, D.	4:27
8	"Desperate Measures"	Tony Kelly		Kelly, T./Beckett, D	3:01
9	"Ghetto Pledge"	Tony Kelly		Kelly, T./Beckett, D.	3:50
10	"Babylon Bwoy"	Dave Kelly		Fagen, Donald/Becker, Walter	3:28
11	"Ma People"	Dave Kelly		Kelly, D./Beckett, D.	3:39
12	"Man & Man"	Dave Kelly		Kelly, D./Beckett, D.	3:28

== Disc two ==
#	Title	Producer(s)	Featured guest(s)	Composer(s)	Time
1	"Who"	Dave Kelly		Kelly, D./Beckett, D.	4:41
2	"Heading to the Top"	Dave Kelly		Kelly, D./Beckett, D.	3:22
3	"On a Roll"	Dave Kelly		Kelly, D./Beckett, D.	3:39
4	"Flossing Everyday"	Dave Kelly		Kelly, D./Beckett, D.	2:58
5	"More"	Dave Kelly	Foxy Brown	Kelly, D./Beckett, D.	2:59
6	"No"	Dave Kelly		Kelly, d./Beckett, D.	3:44
7	"High Rollers"	Dave Kelly	Shaggy	Burrell, O./Harris, Hope/Kelly, D./Beckett, D.	4:03
8	"Smooth Operator"	Dave Kelly	Mr. Easy	Kelly, D./Beckett, D.	3:58
9	"Another Level"	Dave Kelly	Bounty Killer	Pryce, R./Kelly, D./Beckett, D.	3:38
10	"Mama's Teaching	Dave Kelly		Kelly, D./Beckett, D.	4:04

== Credits ==
- Brian Gold – backing vocals
- Tony Gold – backing vocals
- Brian Thompson – vocals
- Christopher Birch – keyboards
- Nigel Staff – keyboards
- Bounty Killer – performer
- Tony Kelly – producer, engineer
- Rovleta Fraser – backing vocals
- Colin "The Captain" Hines – mixing
- Claude "Weakhand" Reynolds – assistant engineer
- Kirk Allen – assistant engineer
- Dave Kelly – bass guitar, producer, engineer, drum programming, mixing, instrumentation
- Baby Cham – main performer
- Aisha Davis – backing vocals
- Mario "Baddable" Gordon – assistant engineer
- Delano "Baddable" McLaughlin – assistant engineer
- Sharpe Sherida – backing vocals
- Sisco "Baddable" Wedderburn – assistant engineer
- Roselyn Williams – backing vocals

== Album singles ==
Single information
"The Mass"
- Released: 16 March 2000
- B-side: "Ghetto Pledge"
"Ghetto Pledge"
- Released: 20 March 2000
- B-side: "Funny Man"
"Funny Man"
- Released: 26 March 2000
- B-side: "Boom/Can I Get A"
"Boom/Can I Get A"
- Released: 24 April 2000
- B-side: "Vitamin S"
