= Luv Songs =

Studio album by Che'Nelle
- Released: 20 July 2011
- Genres: Soul, R&B
- Length: 58:00
- Label: EMI Music Japan

Che'Nelle chronology
Feel Good (2010)	Luv Songs (2011)	Believe (2012)

Singles from Luv Songs
- 1. "Sakura" Released: 2011; 2. "So Sick" Released: 2011; 3. "Baby I Love U" Released: 2011

Luv Songs (ラブ・ソングス) is the third studio album by Malaysian-Australian recording artist Che'Nelle. It was first released on 20 July 2011 by EMI Music Japan. Luv Songs is the singer's first cover album. Most of the songs were translated from Japanese into English by Che'Nelle and her team. She worked with past collaborators Derek Brin, Emile Ghantous and Erik Nelson who produced and recorded songs for the album. Che'Nelle worked with EIGO, who produced additional tracks. "Luv Songs" peaked at number 3 on the Oricon albums chart and spent 107 weeks in total on the chart. A digital deluxe edition was released on 30 November 2011 containing additional versions of "Baby I Love U". To promote "Luv Songs", three official singles were released "Sakura", "So Sick" and "Baby I Love U". The latter becoming one of her most successful singles to date selling more than 500,000 digital downloads alone by October 2013, according to RIAJ. The album was certified gold and later platinum by RIAJ in Japan. In 2013, it was re-released as "Luv Songs -Special Edition" with four additional versions of "Baby I Love U", including remixes by DJ Kaori and DJ Komori.

== Background and production ==
"Luv Songs" is a concept album featuring a collection of cover songs performed by Che'Nelle. Each song was fully licensed by the original right owner and recorded for the album. Che'Nelle is credited as translating and writing the English lyrics for some of the songs. In addition Melinda Torrance, Joe Lamont and AIK receive English lyric writing credits on the album. Hitoshi Namekata was appointed as the executive producer of "Luv Songs", while Yozo Nagani served as the A&R producer. Che'Nelle's past collaborators Derek Brin, Emile Ghantous and Erik Nelson returned to produce music for "Luv Songs". EIGO and Zane also produced songs featured on the record. Vocals were recorded at Insomniax studios and 1023 productions, North Hollywood, California. Mixing of the album took place nearly entirely at Sound City, Tokyo by Shunsuke Shibusawa.

== Promotion ==
"Luv Songs" was released in Japan on 20 July 2011 on CD and via digital download. A deluxe edition of Luv Songs was released via digital download on 30 November 2011. It contains six alternate versions of "Baby I Love U" plus the music video to the song. On 13 November 2013, it was re-released and titled "Luv Songs -Special Edition", which features four additional versions of "Baby I Love U". It was commissioned to celebrate the album surpassing 500,000 sales. The special edition charted at 231 on the Oricon album chart and remained on the chart for a single week.

Che'Nelle's cover of "Sakura", which was originally performed by Ikimono-gakari was chosen as the lead single and released on 1 April 2011. The second single released from "Luv Songs" was the cover of Ne Yo's 2005 song "So Sick". The singer's version of "Baby I Love U" was marketed as the third release from the album. It was released on 22 June 2011. In addition two official promotional CDs were released by EMI Music Japan. The first is a two track disc featuring the radio edit and album version. The second is an official remix titled "Baby I Love U - Winter Version". The song became one of Che'Nelle's most successful singles selling 250,000 full length track cell phone downloads, 500,000 ringtone sales by October 2012 and 500,000 digital downloads by October 2013.

== Chart performance ==
Following its first week sales it charted at number seven on the Japan Oricon album chart. It peaked at number three on the chart and spent a total of 107 weeks on the chart. In August 2011, the album had already shipped more than 100,000 copies and was certified gold. By December its shipments had exceeded 250,000 copies and was certified platinum. Despite the high sales over time, the song only managed to peak at number twenty four on the Japan Hot 100.

At the 2012 Japan Gold Disc Awards "Luv Songs" won the Concept Album of the Year accolade. The album's single "Baby I Love U" received a nomination for Best Karaoke Song at the 2012 MTV Video Music Awards Japan.

== Critical reception ==
A reporter from Barks Japan Music Network said that "Luv Songs" is a "collection full of charm" and described the genre as J-pop. A writer from Yoshimoto Kogyo said that Che'Nelle became "a pioneer of the cover boom" with her Luv Songs series of albums.

== Track listing ==
Track list adapted from the liner notes of Luv Songs.

CD
No.	Title	Original Artist	Length
1.	"Baby I Love U"	TEE	5:25
2.	"Sunshine Girl"	moumoon	3:44
3.	"For You"	lecca	5:15
4.	"So Sick"	Ne-Yo	3:10
5.	"Sakura"	Ikimono-gakari	4:33
6.	"Everything"	MISIA	6:13
7.	"ガラス越しに消えた夏"	Masayuki Suzuki	3:58
8.	"Missing"	Toshinobu Kubota	4:24
9.	"Saving All My Love for You"	Whitney Houston	4:02
10.	"Lovin' You"	Minnie Riperton	3:24
11.	"Without You"	Debbie Gibson	4:27
12.	"上を向いて歩こう"	Kyu Sakamoto	4:17
13.	"Missing" (Japanese Version [Bonus Track])	Toshinobu Kubota	4:24

Digital Deluxe Edition
No.	Title	Length
14.	"Baby I Love U - Winter Ver. -"	5:48
15.	"Baby I Love U" (love with TEE)	5:34
16.	"Baby I Love U" (Instrumental with Click Intro)	5:26
17.	"Baby I Love U" (Karaoke with Click Intro)	5:26
18.	"Baby I Love U - Winter Ver. -" (Instrumental with Click Intro)	5:50
19.	"Baby I Love U - Winter Ver. -" (Karaoke with Click Intro)	5:49
20.	"Baby I Love U" (New Video)

Special Edition
No.	Title	Length
14.	"Baby I Love U" (DJ Kaori Remix)	4:10
15.	"Baby I Love U" (DJ Komori Remix)	6:14
16.	"Baby I Love U" (love with TEE)	5:30
17.	"Baby I Love U" (Karaoke)	5:24

== Personnel ==
Credits adapted from the liner notes of Luv Songs - Special Edition.

=== Production and recording ===
- Che'Nelle - lead vocals, English lyricist
- Tom Coyne - mastering
- EIGO - producer
- Derek Brin - producer
- Emile Ghantous - producer, recording
- Shunsuke Shibusawa - recording, mixing
- Greg Paggani - recording
- Lee Francis - producer, mixing, drums
- Carlton Oglivie - mixing, keyboard, drums
- Patrick Anthony - trumpet
- Rob Beerends - tenor sax
- Stanley "Prince" Andrew - guitar
- Will Davies - mixing
- ZANE - producer
- Henry Tenyue - trombone
- SAUCE - recording
- Dai Hirai - ukulele
- The Ratt Pakk - producer
- Erik Nelson - producer, guitar
- Fil Angelov - mixing
- Tomoe Nishikawa - recording
- Ryousuke Imai - production, mixing
- Sunny Boy - production
- Hirotatsu Takiguchi - mastering
- DJ Komori - remix production
- DJ Kaori - remix production

=== Business and design ===
- Shinnosuke Kotani - art direction, design
- Tomoya Nagatani - photography
- Miho Matsuda - hair and make-up
- Hitoshi Namekata - executive producer
- Kiroshi Monji - chief A&R
- Masahiro Yoshida - chief A&R
- Yozo Nagano - A&R producer
- Gwen Niles - artist manager
- Damon Eden - artist manager
- Yuka Noguchi - marketing and promotion head
- Susumu Kakisaka - TV and radio promotion head
- Yuko Hirose - digital marketing head

== Chart positions ==
=== Weekly charts ===
Chart	Peak position
Japanese Albums (Oricon)	3

=== Year-end charts ===
Chart	Position
2011 Japanese Albums (Oricon)	31
2012 Japanese Albums (Oricon)	49

== Certifications ==
Region	Certification	Certified units/sales
Japan (RIAJ)	Platinum	250,000^{^}
^{^} Shipments figures based on certification alone.

== Release history ==
Country	Date	Format
Japan	20 July 2011	CD
Japan	30 November 2011	Digital download, deluxe edition
Japan	13 November 2013	CD, special edition
South Korea	28 March 2012	Digital download
