= Hurry Up =

Hurry Up may refer to:

== Songs ==
- "Hurry Up" (song), a 2007 song by Che'Nelle
- "Hurry Up", by Mýa from Moodring
- "Hurry Up", by Ritchie Valens from Ritchie

== Other uses ==
- "Hurry Up", an episode (and character) from Stoppit and Tidyup
- Hurry-up offense in American football
- Hurry-up Peak, North Cascades mountains, Washington
