= Vitamin S =

Vitamin S may refer to:

- Salicylic acid, although not a vitamin, is sometimes called "vitamin S"
- a song by Jamaican dancehall musician Cham from his album Ghetto Story
- slang for anabolic steroids, particularly when illicitly provided and/or taken
