= Tanya Stephens =

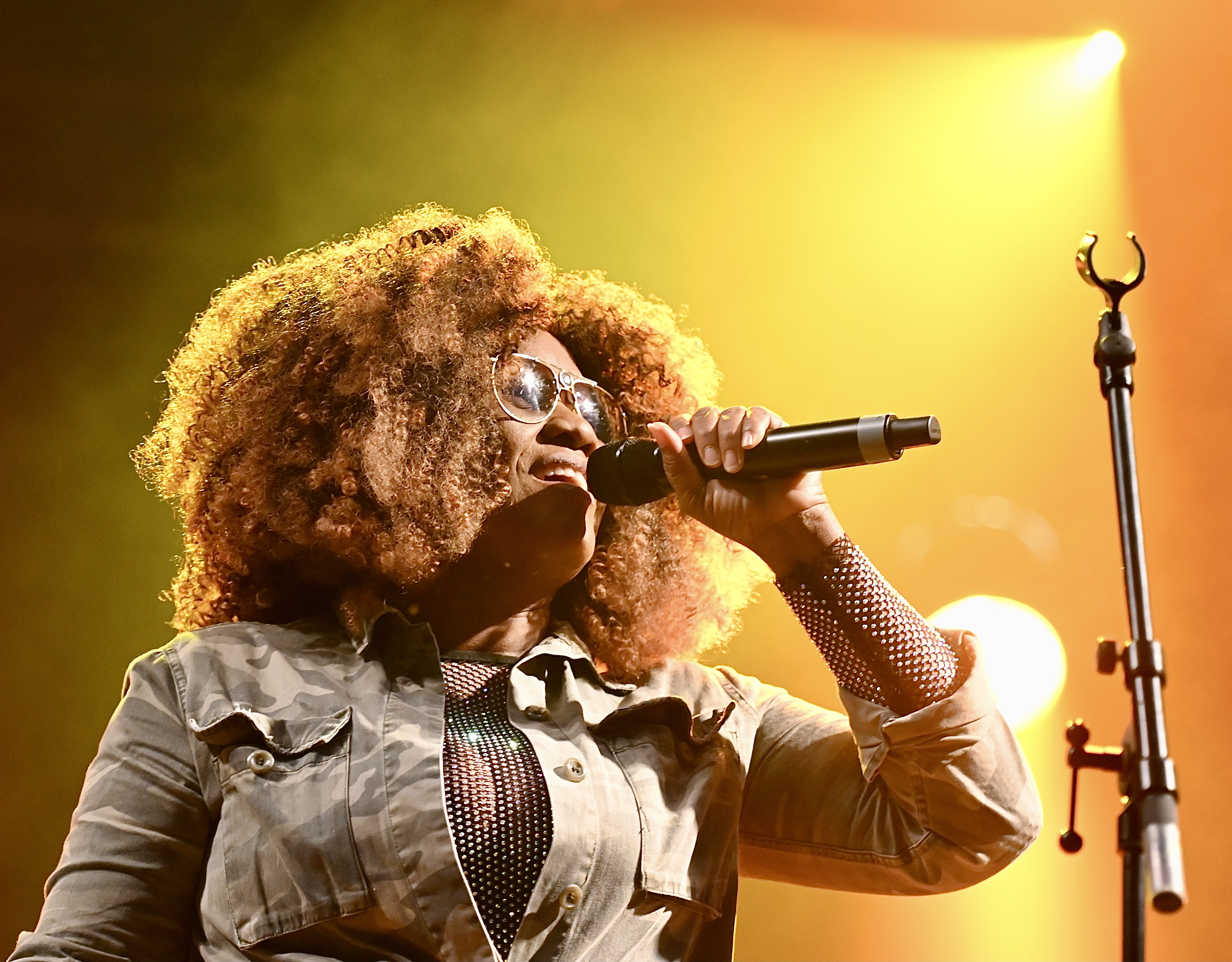
- Tanya Stephens performing live at Reggae Geel, Belgium, 2023.jpg

Background information
- Born: Vivienne Tanya Stephenson; 2 July 1973 (age 53)
- Origin: St. Mary, Jamaica
- Genres: Dancehall, reggae
- Occupations: Deejay, singer
- Years active: 1994–present
- Labels: VP, Madhouse, Tarantula, Sanctum

Vivienne Tanya Stephenson (born 2 July 1973), known by her stage name Tanya Stephens, is a Jamaican reggae singer and deejay who emerged in the late 1990s. She is most known for her hits "Yuh Nuh Ready Fi Dis Yet" — later featured on the Reggae Gold 1997 compilation album — and "It's a Pity", for which Stephens achieved international recognition. She and business partner Andrew Henton have together co-founded Tarantula Records.

== Biography ==
Stephens was born in 1973 and grew up in St. Mary and St. Ann, attending Zion Hill and Ocho Rios primary schools and St Mary High. She has three brothers and three sisters (one sister deceased).

She began recording in the mid-1990s for producers such as Dave Kelly and Philip "Fatis" Burrell. Her 1996 single "Yuh Nuh Ready Fi Dis Yet", produced by Kelly, brought her to the attention of the Jamaican public, and she had further success with singles such as "Draw fi Mi Finger", "Freaky Type", and "Cry and Bawl". Her debut, Big Things a Gwaan, was released in 1994 (featuring Yami Bolo on a cover version of Suzanne Vega's "Tom's Diner" and Prezident Brown on a remix of the title track), and second album Too Hype followed in 1997.

She moved to Sweden, where she signed a record deal with Warner Music Sweden and recorded the 2001 pop album Sintoxicated. After returning to Jamaica she released the critically acclaimed Gangsta Blues album in 2004.

Her album Rebelution was released in August 2006, and the first single "These Streets" was a number one hit in the Caribbean staying on Tempo's Chart at number 1 for more than 4 weeks. The album was totally sold out in Jamaica and other parts of the Caribbean. The track "Come A Long Way" is a dedication to black leaders.

Infallible, was released in 2010, initially given free with the Jamaican base German magazine Riddim then made available for free download for more than a year.

In 2019, Stephens was honoured by the Jamaica Reggae Industry Association (JaRIA) for her contribution to the reggae industry as a songwriter.

== Legal issues ==
In 2006, Tanya sued American rapper Lil' Kim for plagiarism on her song "Durty" from The Naked Truth asking for all rights to the song, past, present & future. Stephens claimed that Kim used the lyrics from her song "Mi and Mi God", stating that "she even used a west Indian accent". She claimed that in 1999 Tanya was flown out to New York by Kim, who claimed to be a huge fan & owned her albums, Kim wanted her to record for an album, but her vocals were never used.

== Lyrical content ==
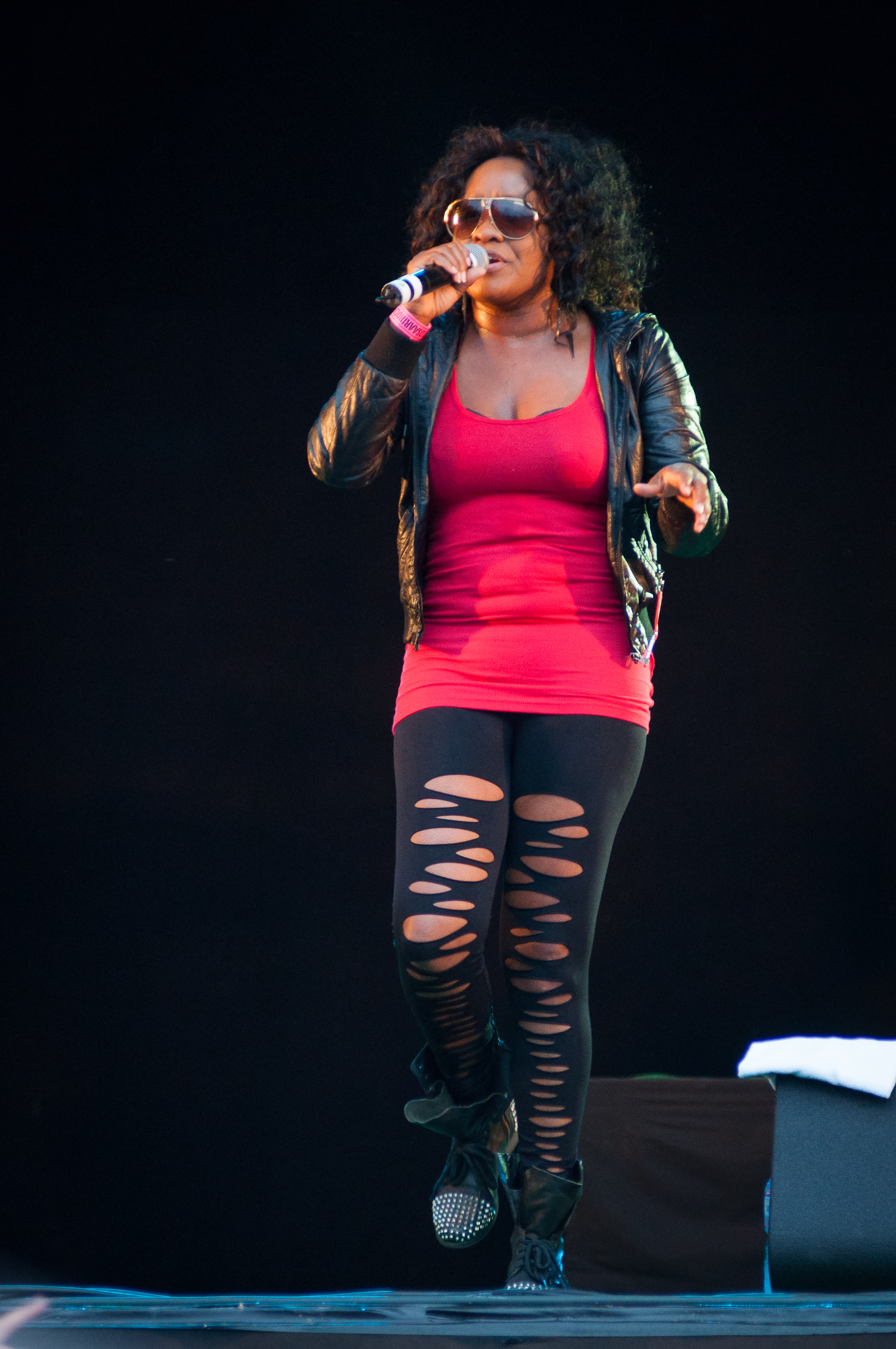
Stephens performing in 2012

Her early material was lyrically typical of dancehall and drew comparisons with Lady Saw, along with whom she was proclaimed "the top female artists in Jamaica" in 1998 by the Washington Post, but later developed beyond what she called "the same old four topics" to 'reality' themes and even lyrics critical of homophobia. Social scientist Clinton Hutton said of her: "She is very intuitively intelligent and deftly tackles relevant social issues".

In a talk in 2011 at the University of the West Indies, she urged her fellow artists to be more socially responsible, and spoke out against the objectification of women in dancehall lyrics and the promotion of bigotry and violation of human rights, saying "The music that once spoke to and spread messages of peace and love, now merely judges, condemns and provokes."

Her song "Still Alive" deals with discrimination against people with HIV, and it was used in a television campaign dealing with the issue.

== Other work ==
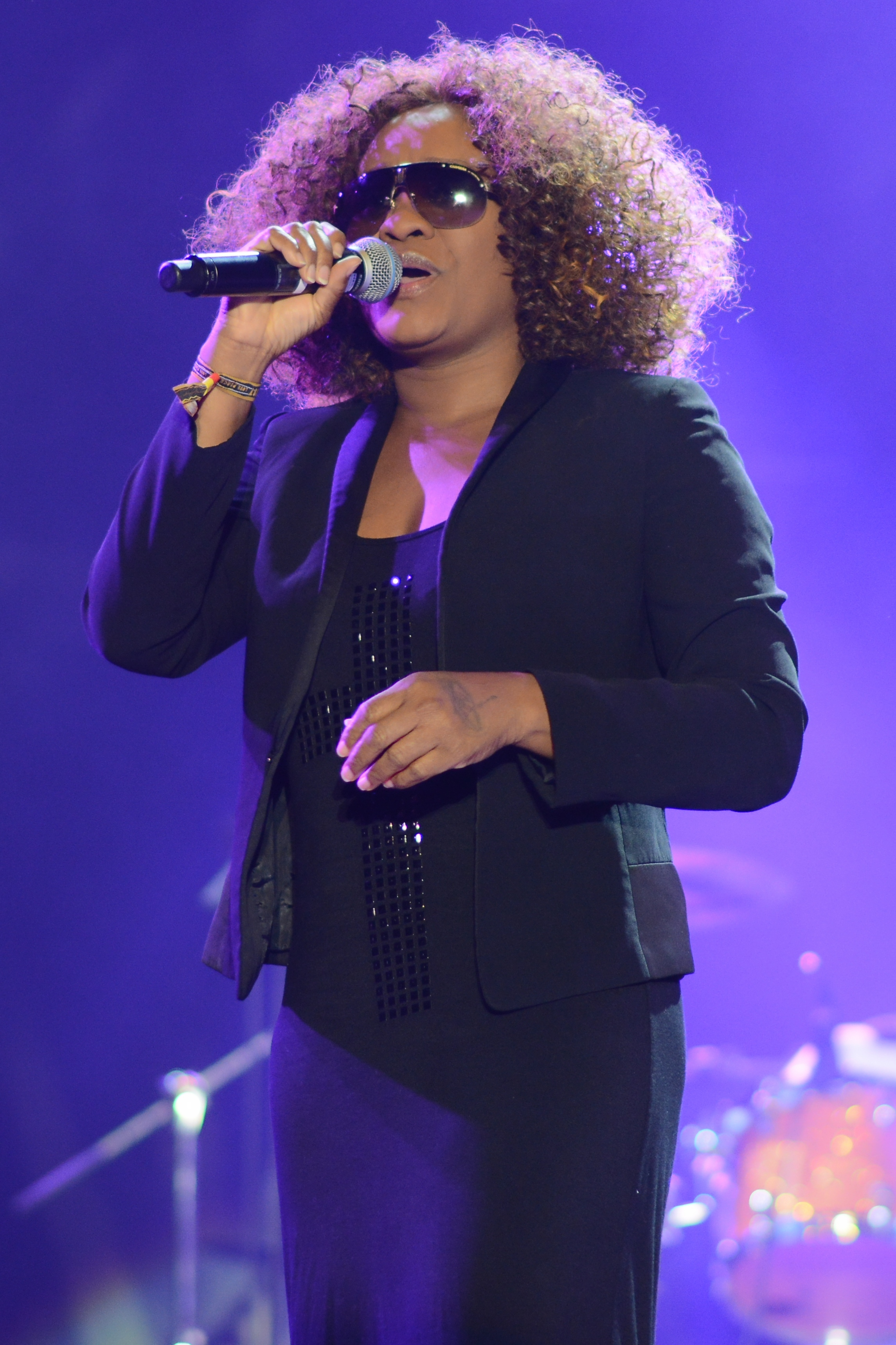
Stephens performing in 2014

In 2007, Stephens was awarded a scholarship by Resource Development International to study for a Business Management degree via the internet from the University of Sunderland.

In 2009 she made her acting debut, playing Nurse Tracey in the CVM TV series Royal Palm Estate. She also opened the restaurant 'H_{2}O' the same year in the Coconut Grove Shopping Centre in Ocho Rios.

Tanya also owns Tarantula Records, founded in 2004 with business partner & producer Andrew Henton which has handled all of her music since then.

== Personal life ==
Stephens has a daughter, Kelly, born in 1994.

== Discography ==
=== Albums ===
Title	Year	Label	Peak chart positions
Title	Year	Label	Billboard Top Reggae Albums
Big Things a Gwaan	1994	Runn	—
Too Hype	1997	VP	—
Work Out	1997	Joe Gibbs Music	—
Ruff Rider	1998	VP	—
Sintoxicated	2001	Warner Music Sweden	
Gangsta Blues	2004	Tarantula/VP	10
Rebelution	2006	Tarantula/VP	11
Infallible	2010	Tarantula	—
Guilty	2013	Sanctum	—
"—" denotes releases that did not chart.

==== Compilations ====
- Tanya: Collection of Hits (2009), VP/Warner Bros. Records

=== Singles ===
- "One Touch" (1994), Shelly Power
- "No More Lies" (1994), Xterminator
- "Yuh Nuh Ready Fi Dis Yet" (1995), Madhouse
- "Short Wuck" (1995), Stone Love
- "Man Fi Rule" (1995), Firehouse Crew
- "Cry Freedom" (1996), Cell Block 321
- "Gotta Find Someone" (1996), Vibes House
- "Friends" (1996), Hyped
- "Gangster Girl" (1996), East Coast
- "Big Things a Gwaan" (1996), Runn
- "Handle the Ride" (1997), Digital B
- "Big Heavy Gal" (1997), Shocking Vibes
- "Goggle" (1997), Shocking Vibes
- "1-1-9" (1997), Hotwax
- "Work Out" (1997), Joe Gibbs Music
- "Draw Fi Mi Finger" (1997), Hotwax/VP
- "Handle the Ride" (1997), Digital-B
- "Big Ninja Bike" (1997), Annex
- "Steppa Gal" (1998), Rude Boy Records
- "Bounce Me" (1998), 2 Hard Recordings
- "One Style" (1998), Digital-B
- "Pose Gal" (1998), Jazzy Creations
- "Learn Fi Choose" (1998), Fat Eyes
- "Who Have the Link" (1998), Fat Eyes
- "Choppa" (1998), Goldhead
- "My Type" (1998), Mawga Man
- "Ta Ta" (1998), Bankylous
- "True Potential" (1999), Top Secret
- "Rigormortis" (1999), Mo' Music Productions
- "Fag in a Closet" (1999), Finatic
- "For You" (1999), 1st Foundation
- "Commercial Jack" (1999), Jamdown – B-side of Scare Dem Crew's "Party Time"
- "Serious Thing" (1999), Call Me $ham$
- "One Gran" (1999), Spider Man
- "Corners Boy" (1999), How Yu Fi Sey Dat?
- "Wuk and Bruk" (1999), RC-ONE
- "Dis Name" (1999), Pure & Clean
- "Wuk Dat" (2000), Kings of Kings
- "Shetengae" (2000), Studio 2000
- "Big Up Di Cash" (2000), Fan Club
- "Bad Luck Boy" (2000), Flynn & Flynn
- "Back to Haunt Me" (2001), Telegram Records Stockholm
- "Galang So" (2001), First Name – B-side of Cobra's "Standing"
- "What a Day" (2002), Xterminator
- "It's Over Now" (2002), Dubz House
- "Soft Inside" (2002), Topaz
- "Forever" (2002), Silly Walks Productions
- "Leave Me Alone" (2002), M.U.S.S.E.L.
- "Ratings Falling" (2002), Cali Bud
- "Shorty" (2002), Heights of Heights
- "What's the Story" (2002), Flabba – B-side of Christopher's "Thank You Lord"
- "Drought" (2002), Sweet Sadie's Production
- "Need You Tonight" (2002), Germaican
- "Touch Me No More" (2002), 40/40 Productions
- "Blaze the Fire" (2003), Rashanco Music
- "Gangsta" (2003), Creation Star Music
- "Tek Him Back" (2003), Xterminator
- "U Don't Get It" (2003), Fat Eyes
- "It's About Time" (2003), South Rakkas Crew
- "Have Mercy" (2003), Creation Star Music
- "Hunt Fah" (2003), Golden Cartel
- "Champagne" (2003), Beat Ruut Music
- "Toe to Toe" (2003), Raggedy Joe
- "Dis Ya Gal" (2003), South Block
- "Need Fi Know Yu" (2003), First Name Music
- "It's All Right" (2003), Vikings Production
- "Can't Move Me" (2003), Raggedy Joe
- "One Last Bridge" (2003), Creation Star Music
- "Power of a Girl" (2003), Pow Pow Productions
- "Shot It Up" (2003), Shajay
- "Tonight" (2003), Xterminator
- "Missing U" (2003), Live Wire Productions
- "Call It a Draw" (2003), Big Jeans – with KC Jockey
- "Can't Help It" (2003), Cali Bud
- "Style Yu Want" (2004), H2O Productions
- "Bleach Pon It" (2004), Fire Links Production
- "Not Your Own" (2004), Shocking Vibes
- "It's a Pity" (2004), Germaican
- "How Long" (2004), Dem Yute Deh Music
- "After You" (2004), Don Corleon
- "Bring It On" (2004), Insight
- "Gansta Roll" (2004), In Time Music
- "Little White Lie" (2004), VP
- "The Other Cheek" (2004), Tarantula Records
- "Better Luck" (2004), Joe Frasier
- "Can't Breathe" (2004), Al.Ta.Fa.An.
- "Life" (2004), One Love
- "Call Me Back" (2004), All Access
- "Party Tonight" (2004), Germaican
- "These Streets" (2006), Tarantula/VP
- "No Regular" (2006), Pure & Clean
- "Forever" (2006), Silly Walks Productions
- "Who's Sexing You" (2006), Reggae Republic
- "I'm Bad" (2007), Mafia and Fluxy
- "I'm Not Proud" (2007), Mafia & Fluxy
- "Fire Burning" (2012), Tarantula/VP
- "Feeling It..." (2012), Hyyype Muzik
- "Take Good Care (of My Man)" (2012), Kingston Songs

==== Duets and combination singles ====
- "How Many Ways" (1996), Brickwall – Shabba Ranks and Tanya Stephens
- "Crazy For Your Loving" (1996), Sampalue – with Chevel Franklyn
- "Independent Gal" (1997), Pot of Gold – with Lady Saw
- "Cry and a Bawl" (1998), Fat Eyes – Bounty Killer and Tanya Stephens
- "Freaky Type" (1998), Hi Profile – Tanya Stephens and Richard Browne
- "Buck Them Up" (1999), Insomnia – Lady Saw and Tanya Stephens
- "Fire" (1999), Kings of Kings – Tanya Stephens and Spanner Banner
- "Come Nuh" (1999), Wallstreet – Dillgin and Tanya Stephens
- "Nuh Mek It" (2000), Jamdown – Spragga Benz and Tanya Stephens
- "Don't Take My Love for Granted" (2002), Xterminator – with Sizzla
- "Skettle 2004" (2004), Golden Kartel – Tanya Stephens and Cecil, B-side of Sasha's "Run Dung Me"
- "Enuff 4 U" (2004), Wall of Sound – TCC Prassay featuring Tanya Stephens
- "Dance 4 Me" (2006) – Mark Morrison featuring Tanya Stephens, promo only CD-R
- "Child of the Universe" (2007) on Chuck Fenda's album The Living Fire (2007)
- "Heart of Stone" (2008), Bass Inna Yu Face – Taddy P. featuring Tanya Stephens
- "Want Love" (2012), Kirkledove – with Marcia Griffiths
