= The Insomniax =

American musical group

The Insomniax (USA)
- Origin: Chicago, Illinois, United States
- Genres: Pop, rock, R&B, urban contemporary, soul, alternative dance, hip hop
- Years active: 2002-present
- Members: Emile Ghantous; Erik Nelson
- Website: www.myspace.com/theinsomniax

The Insomniax (USA) is an American songwriting/music production duo made up of Emile Ghantous and Erik Nelson.

The two met in 1994 while Nelson was the owner of a local recording studio and Ghantous was a local up-and-coming music producer. After collaborating for some projects, they formed the successful Chicago-based duo that gave big hits to JLS, Jason Derulo, Che'Nelle, JoJo, Fat Joe, Boyz II Men, R. Kelly, Frankie J, O-Town, and others.

"The Insomniax" choice for a name is a reference to long hours in the studio, well after midnight.
