= Rebelution =

Rebelution may refer to:

- The Rebelution, a Christian movement
- Rebelution (band), a reggae band from Santa Barbara, California
  - Rebelution (Rebelution album)
- Pitbull Starring in Rebelution, 2009
- Rebelution (Tanya Stephens album), 2006
