= These Streets (disambiguation) =

These Streets is the debut studio album by Scottish singer-songwriter Paolo Nutini, or its title track.

These Streets may also refer to:

- "These Streets", a song by Tanya Stephens from the album Rebelution (Tanya Stephens album)
- "These Streets", a song by Bastille from the album Bad Blood (Bastille album)
- "These Streets" (Frankmusik song)
- These Streets EP, by Bugz
