= Infallible (album) =

Studio album by Tanya Stephens
- Released: April 26, 2012 Free download, CD (with "Riddim" magazine only)
- Recorded: 2006–2010, Tanya Stephens' home in Kingston, Jamaica
- Genre: Reggae, dancehall
- Length: 72:13
- Label: Tarantula Records (Production/Publishing)
- Producer: Andrew Henton, Tanya Stephens

Tanya Stephens chronology
| Rebelution (2006) | Infallible (2012) | Guilty (2012) |

Infallible is the 7th studio album released by Jamaican recording artist Tanya Stephens. This album was unique in the sense that it was a free download to all her fans. Tanya released the album for free stating "Infallible by Tanya Stephens! Feel free to forward the link to as many people as you wish. The album is completely free of cost. Enjoy!!" Andrew Henton, Tanya's life partner and co-founder of Tarantula Records stated the reason the album was a free download was because Tanya wanted to do something special for her fans, the major reason being that there's a recession going on, and things are already hard on everyone, he then stated that Tanya believes that when she gives an album to a major label (e.g. VP Records), technically she's giving it away for free anyway, so she would much rather give it directly to the fans. The website that originally hosted the album was BYM Riddim, although the website has since shut down making the album unavailable to download, although the album has been uploaded to other websites such as MediaFire & RapidShare by fans making it easy enough to download. Tanya approves of this, as it was a free album, she merely wanted the album to reach her fans. The album was also given away as a hard copy with Jamaican-based German magazine, 'Riddim' and can be backordered.

== Track listing ==
All tracks are written by V. Stephenson

| No. | Title | Length |
|---|---|---|
| 1. | "Spection" (Intro) | 1:08 |
| 2. | "Train Of Thought (Get On It)" | 4:10 |
| 3. | "No Strings Attached" | 5:45 |
| 4. | "Bury A Bone" | 5:14 |
| 5. | "Luv At First Grind" | 4:25 |
| 6. | "Siddung Pon It" | 3:40 |
| 7. | "Kiss My Brain" | 3:21 |
| 8. | "Itty Bit O' Money" | 4:04 |
| 9. | "Illusion" | 4:07 |
| 10. | "Still Alive" | 5:03 |
| 11. | "No Means No" | 4:50 |
| 12. | "4 Da Pain" | 5:21 |
| 13. | "Infallible" | 4:08 |
| 14. | "Just For Me" | 3:38 |
| 15. | "More Than I Love You" | 3:26 |
| 16. | "Try Me" | 3:38 |
| 17. | "Turn It Up" | 3:31 |
| 18. | "Pull Up" | 3:38 |
| Total length: | | 72:13 |

== Reception ==
Reggae Vibes said of the album; "Infallible, Tanya Stephens' much anticipated new album and the follow-up to the 2006 released Rebelution, has finally seen the light of day, and has exclusively been given away free with this month's edition (#49) of German's Riddim magazine.

Tanya Stephens is ranked as one of our 10 favourite contemporary artists, not least because she's one of the most competent lyricists today. Her lyrical delivery is full of imagery and direct down to the last detail, which sets her apart as a perfect storyteller. Besides that she possesses an instantly recognizable passionate edgy, bluesy voice that perfectly blends with the musical backing of her songs. Musically most tracks on this "Infallible" set are very similar to those featured on the Gangsta Blues and Rebelution albums. This implies that the warm, distinctive vibe of these two albums, and even more in case of "Infallible", not always immediately sounds like reggae.

Just like "Rebelution", this brand new collection of tunes gets off with a fulminating intro. Next up is Train Of Thought (Get On It), a solid tune which comes across a R&B flavoured backdrop with bluesy guitar licks. The strong No Strings Attached, reminiscent of her hit song These Streets, brings us the songstress/songwriter at her very best. The melancholic Bury A Bone, a truly wonderful tune with a completely different vibe than the previous tunes, concludes the opening bit to Tanya Stephens' Infallible'. Overall a seamless opening which spearheads a well varied and expertly produced album. The remainder of this set maintains the high quality level throughout with Luv At First Grind, Siddung Pon It, Itty Bit O'Money, No Means No and 4 Da Pain being the shining stars. With the last three songs, Try Me, Turn It Up and Pull Up, Tanya Stephens shows that she's still capable of delivering decent dancehall tunes." Then giving it the ratings of: 4/5 for vocals, 5 for backing vocals, 5 for Andrew Henton's production, 5 for sound quality, 3 for cover art.

The Jamaica Star also gave it a good review, giving it 4/5 stars and stating "It's been four years since the release of her last album Rebelution, and with her latest release, Infallible, deejay, Tanya Stephens, proves that she's far from being out of lyrics. The 36-year-old lyricist proves that she still has new ways to talk about sex, love, relationships, 'Joe Grind', and spices up her catalogue with serious issues such as HIV and rape. The seventh studio album from Stephens, Infallible shows the many sides of the talented artiste through the course of 18 tracks. A mellow listen, Infallible mixes genres well, ultising sounds from the dancehall, reggae as well as the blues.

In No Strings Attached, Stephens starts off the song by asking forgiveness for her transgressions of needing a man on the side, one who can still party and grind. In Bury A Bone she catches the listener from the outset with a telephone message she leaves on a guy's phone as she says, "Hi this is Tanya remember you gave me your number bout a month ago and I said I had a man and you insisted I kept it for a rainy day, well surprise its raining," as she eagerly looks for a next guy to be her ex-guy.

Siddung Pon It has a current dancehall flair that the girls will want to 'wine out' to with lines such as, "we should be wining in the back of the bar or grinding in the back of my car or if we can't mek it that far, tek it anywhere we are, cause siddung pon it, mi waan ride pon it."

Songs like 4 Da Pain, Just For Me and others talk about love and relationship. The title track Infallible, Stephens wrote for her daughter as she asks for understanding in the lessons she tries to instil, as she is only human. Two of the more touching songs on the album are Still Alive and No Means No. Still Alive talks about "Johnny" who is living with HIV but everyone sees him as a dead man while he proclaims that he wants to be seen as alive. Infallible is another well put together album from Tanya Stephens that showcases her strong point - her lyrical content." The album was given by Jamaican Star; the Star of the Week award.
