= Gangsta Blues =

2004 album by Tanya Stephens

Studio album by Tanya Stephens
- Released: March 30, 2004
- Recorded: 2001–2004
- Studios: Tarantula Studios (Tanya's home); Anchor Recording Studios; 321 Recording Studio; Digital B; Steven Stanley Recording Studios
- Length: 61:56
- Label: VP/Tarantula Records
- Producers: Andrew Henton, Barry O'Hare, Neil Amos, Romain "Sherkhan" Chiffre, Tanya Stephens, Mr. Doo, Philip "Fatis" Burrell, Louis "Flabba" Malcolm, Anthony Senior, Boris Silvera, Steven Stanley, Digital B

Tanya Stephens chronology
Sintoxicated (2001)	Gangsta Blues (2004)	Rebelution (2006)

Singles from Gangsta Blues
- 1. "It's a Pity" Released: December 22, 2003; 2. "Can't Breathe" Released: June 12, 2006

Gangsta Blues is the fifth album by the Jamaican recording artist Tanya Stephens.

== Background ==
Recording for the album took place in-between 2001 and 2004. It was recorded across various recording studios in Jamaica and America. Production came from her longtime life partner Andrew Henton among many others including Neil Amos, Romain "Sherkhan" Chiffre, Mr. Doo, Philip "Fatis" Burrell, Steven Stanley, and Digital B, with writing coming from Tanya herself on every track, Andrew on most plus a lot of other writers throughout the album.

== Track listing ==
Track listing
No.	Title	Writer	Length
1.	"Intro"	V. Stephenson, A. Henton	01:14
2.	"Way Back"	V. Stephenson, A. Henton	05:17
3.	"Boom Wuk"	V. Stephenson, A. Henton	04:01
4.	"Damn" (Skit)	V. Stephenson, A. Henton	02:21
5.	"Good Ride"	V. Stephenson, C. Lawrence, R. Myrie	03:54
6.	"Little White Lie"	V. Stephenson, A. Henton	03:47
7.	"It's a Pity"	V. Stephenson, P. Baigorry, J. Bugnon, L. Topp	04:15
8.	"Tek Him Back"	V. Stephenson, C. Dodd	03:38
9.	"I Am Woman"	Helen Reddy, R. Burton	01:44
10.	"This Is Love" (featuring Wyclef Jean)	V. Stephenson, E. Gotthard, W. Jean	04:26
11.	"Gangsta Gal" (featuring Spragga Benz)	V. Stephenson, A. Henton, C. Grant	03:54
12.	"What's Your Story"	V. Stephenson, A. Henton	03:52
13.	"Can't Breathe"	V. Stephenson, A. Henton, M. Miller	04:12
14.	"Sound of My Tears"	V. Stephenson, A. Henton	04:05
15.	"The Other Cheek" (samples "Don't Need the Sun to Shine (to Make Me Smile)" by Gabrielle)	V. Stephenson, A. Henton	03:57
16.	"What a Day"	V. Stephenson, M. Chin	03:22
17.	"We a Lead"	V. Stephenson, A. Henton	03:57
Total length:			61:56

== Reception ==
Kelefa Sanneh of The New York Times described the music as "acoustic-guitar laments and joyful digital dancehall", and in Sanneh's view the album is "full of witty reggae protest songs". Vibe's Rob Kenner regarded it as Stephens' best album to date. Allmusic writer Rick Anderson gave it two and half stars out of five, describing the rhythms as "expert but not exactly revelatory ", and the lyrics "mostly a predictable mix of defensive braggadocio and by-the-numbers slackness", but picking out "Little White Lie", "What's Your Story", and "It's a Pity" for particular praise.

== Chart History ==
=== Billboard ===
- Billboard Reggae albums - 10

== Personnel ==
- Writers - V. Stephenson, C. Grant, W. Jean, A. Henton, C. Lawrence, R. Myrie, P Baigorry, J. Buggon, L. Topp, C. Dodd, H. Reddy, R. Burton, E. Getthard, H. Seaton
- Producers - Dave Kelly, Tony Kelly, Andrew Henton, Barry O'Hare, Neil Amos, Romain "Sherkhan" Chiffre, Tanya Stephens, Mr. Doo, Phillip 'Fattis' Burrell, Louis "Flabba" Malcolm, Anthony Senior, Boris Silvera, Steven Stanley, Digiteal B
- Editing & Mixing - Paul Shields of VP Records
- Cover Art photography - William Richards
- Cover Art design - Kerry DeBruce
- Publishing - VP Records, Tarantula Records, Warner/Chappell, STB Music, Topp Entertainment, Jamrec Music

== Please note ==
- Information such as Writers & Personnel is taken directly from the CD inlay.
