= Derek Brin =

- Origin: Toronto, Ontario, Canada
- Genres: R&B; hip-hop; pop; Caribbean
- Occupations: Record Producer; songwriter; sound designer; mix engineer
- Instruments: Piano; drums

Derek Brin is a multi-platinum, award-winning music producer, sound designer, and mix engineer.

== Career ==
Brin, whose father is from St. Thomas and mother is Trinidadian, was born in Toronto, but raised between Toronto and the US Virgin Islands. Before starting his own company, Brin spent 10 years as the in-house Composer, Sound Editor, and Head of Audio Operations at Visual Productions, a film and television production company, based in Toronto and South Africa.

Brin has worked with several of the industry's hottest artists, including Ne-Yo, Dan Hill, Jaheim, RuPaul, Kelly Price, Che'Nelle, Massari, Jane Zhang, Noel G, Dru, Andreea Bălan, Keo, Puya, Keshia Chanté, Kristine W, and Dream Warriors. Brin has been engineer and programmer for hit songwriter Dan Hill since 2004 and programmer for industry heavyweights like Diane Warren (Realsongs), Guy Roche, Jud Friedman, and Allan Rich.

Brin's work has been featured on So You Think You Can Dance, The Hills, Degrassi: The Next Generation, Degrassi Goes Hollywood, Wild Discovery, Supermarket Sweep, The Mom Show, Blue Murder, Psi Factor: Chronicles of the Paranormal, Cover Guy, The NHL Awards, and Fashion File. He also contributed to Pokémon: The First Movie, Save The Last Dance 2, Blue Streak, Smokin' Aces, Poker Night, and Replikator.

Brin founded Fierce Music Entertainment Inc., based in Toronto, Los Angeles, and the Caribbean. He is also CEO and creator of iCaribbeanTunes.com, a major portal where the film, television, and video game industries can go to license music from the Caribbean. In 2007, Brin signed an international publishing deal with Ole Music Publishing. In 2009, Brin was appointed to the board of directors of the Urban Music Association of Canada (UMAC) as Director of Artist Relations.

== Selected discography ==
- One Track Mind by TBTBT (Too Bad to be True) - 1993
- Can I Get A Yo by Graphidi Logik - 1994
- Subliminal Simulation by Dream Warriors - 1994
- Flex by Belinda - 1996
- Do You Know (What It Takes) by Robyn - 1997 (No. 7 Billboard Top 100 single, US gold)
- Pokémon: The First Movie, soundtrack - 1998
- While You Were Gone by Kelly Price (Blue Streak soundtrack) - 1999
- Stamina by Rameses - 1999
- Stronger by Kristine W - 2000 (No. 1 Billboard Dance)
- www.fan-ta-see by Innosense - 2000
- Closer by In Essence - 2003
- Nothing Left To Say by Ryan Malcolm - 2003
- Unconditional by Kalan Porter - 2004
- Unpredictable by Keshia Chanté - 2004 (Canada gold)
- Red Hot by RuPaul - 2004
- Daddy Thing by Jaheim - 2006 (No. 1 entry Billboard Top 200)
- Hungry For Love by Andreea Bălan - 2006
- I Fell In Love With The DJ by Che'Nelle - 2007
- Body Body by Massari - 2009
- Under The Radar by Massari - 2009
- Would You Mind by Dru - 2009

== Selected filmography ==
=== Film ===
- Pokémon: The First Movie - 1998
- Blue Streak - 1999
- Save The Last Dance 2 - 2006
- Smokin' Aces - 2006
- Degrassi Goes Hollywood - 2009

=== TV ===
- Supermarket Sweep - 1993-2012
- Blue Murder - 2003-2004
- Da Kink in My Hair - 2007-2009
- The Mom Show - 2007-2012
- The Hills - 2008
- So You Think You Can Dance (US) - 2008
- Kanako, Challenging the System (Documentary) - 2009
- Degrassi Goes Hollywood - 2009
- So You Think You Can Dance (Canada) - 2010
- Positive Women (Documentary) - 2012

== Awards and nominations ==
Year	Nominated work	Award	Result
2006	Derek Brin'	Best New Artist - Female	Nominated
2006	Derek Brin'	Best Female Vocal	Nominated
2010	Derek Brin & Gary Serrao'	Best Soca Compilation Rhythm	Nominated

Brin composed music for the television series, Adventures in Evergreen Forest, which won a CANPRO Award for Best Children's Programming.

Brin received Canadian Urban Music Awards for Album of the Year and Best R&B Single. In 2004, he was nominated for Producer of the Year.

In 2007, Brin co-produced the song "Beautiful Surprise" for Philip7, which received a nomination for Best Alternative Song at the Barbados Music Awards.
