= Ghetto Story =

Studio album by Cham
- Released: 15 August 2006
- Studios: The Boxx Studio; CRS Recordings Studios (Barbados)
- Genres: Dancehall; reggae fusion
- Length: 1:09:01
- Labels: Mad House; Atlantic
- Producer: Dave Kelly

Cham chronology
Wow... The Story (2000)	Ghetto Story (2006)	Lawless (2017)

Singles from Ghetto Story
- 1. "Vitamin S" Released: 2004; 2. "Ghetto Story Chapter 2" Released: 2006

Professional ratings
Review scores
Source	Rating
AllMusic	4/5 stars
MSN Music	(choice cut)
Rolling Stone	3/5 stars
The Guardian	4/5 stars

Ghetto Story is the second studio album by Jamaican dancehall singer Cham. It was released on 15 August 2006 through Mad House/Atlantic Records. Produced entirely by Dave Kelly, it features guest appearances from Majic Massey, Alicia Keys, Jimmy Cheeztrix, Rihanna, Tia Jean and Akon.

In the United States, the album peaked at number 53 on the Billboard 200, number 11 on the Top R&B/Hip-Hop Albums, number 5 on the Top Rap Albums and atop the Reggae Albums charts.

The album's first charted single, "Vitamin S", made it to No. 56 on the Hot R&B/Hip-Hop Songs in the US. The second charted single, "Ghetto Story Chapter 2", became more successful, reaching No. 62 on the UK singles chart and No. 77 on the US Billboard Hot 100 chart.

== Track listing ==
All tracks are written by Damian Beckett and David Kelly, except track 8 is written with Tia Jean, Ali Tennant, Guz Lally and R. Angol, track 15 is written with Alicia Cook, and track 16 is written with Aliaune Thiam.

No.	Title	Length
1.	"Ghetto Story"	4:10
2.	"Tic Toc"	3:49
3.	"Rude Boy Pledge"	3:33
4.	"Bring It On (Remix)" (featuring Majic Massey)	3:10
5.	"Don't Test Me"	3:32
6.	"Wah Dem a Seh Now?"	3:45
7.	"Fat Punnany (Hottie Hottie Girl)" (featuring Majic Massey)	4:45
8.	"Bad Boys" (featuring Tia Jean)	3:56
9.	"Boom Boom" (featuring Rihanna)	4:13
10.	"Talk to Me"	4:11
11.	"Vitamin S"	4:12
12.	"Love It Like That"	3:26
13.	"Girl" (featuring Jimmy Cheezetrix)	3:50
14.	"Cham"	3:11
15.	"Ghetto Story Chapter 2" (featuring Alicia Keys)	4:45
16.	"Ghetto Story Chapter 3" (featuring Akon)	4:22
17.	"Bad Mind"	6:11
Total length:		1:09:01

== Charts ==
=== Weekly charts ===
Chart (2006)	Peak position
US Billboard 200	53
US Top R&B/Hip-Hop Albums (Billboard)	11
US Top Rap Albums (Billboard)	5
US Reggae Albums (Billboard)	1

=== Year-end charts ===
Chart (2006)	Position
US Reggae Albums (Billboard)	9
