= Tarantula Records =

Jamaican record label

- Founded: 2004
- Founder: Tanya Stephens; Andrew Henton
- Distributor: VP Records
- Genre: Reggae, Dancehall
- Country of origin: Jamaica

Tarantula Records was created by Jamaican recording artist Tanya Stephens and her life partner Andrew Henton. The label was set up because Tanya desired more freedom over her music and lyrics. Henton makes the beats out of his home and she records at hers. Since being founded in 2004, the label has released three albums. VP Records handled distribution for albums Gangsta Blues and Rebelution. Infallible was an online, free album. The only hard copies were given out with Riddim magazine.

== Discography ==
Title	Release date	Chart history
Gangsta Blues	March 30, 2004	10
Rebelution	August 29, 2006	11
Infallible	April 26, 2012 Free download, CD (with Riddim magazine only)	-
Guilty	December 2, 2014	-

"-" denotes the album did not chart.
