= Sintoxicated =

Studio album by Tanya Stephens
- Released: May 30, 2001 Sweden only
- Recorded: 1998–2001
- Genre: Reggae, dancehall, pop
- Length: 48:40
- Label: Warner Music Sweden
- Producer: Emil Gotthard, Peter Cartriers

Tanya Stephens chronology
Ruff Rider (1998)	Sintoxicated (2001)	Gangsta Blues (2004)

Sintoxicated is the fourth studio album by Jamaican recording artist Tanya Stephens. The album was Stephens' only release with Warner Music Sweden-Irie Records, released only in Sweden. Outside Sweden, the album is very difficult to locate.

== Track listing ==
All lyrics are written by V. Stephenson; all music is composed by A. Henton

No.	Title	Length
1.	"Banging In Gray"	4:19
2.	"Lying Lips (Words I Should Have Said)"	4:43
3.	"No More"	4:05
4.	"Tonight"	5:04
5.	"I Can See A Storm Coming"	4:41
6.	"In The Beginning"	4:50
7.	"Kiss The Kids"	4:52
8.	"Only Human"	4:45
9.	"Love You A Lot (...So I Lie A Little)"	3:59
10.	"Back To Haunt Me"	4:04
11.	"Home"	3:18
Total length:		48:40

== Chart history ==
- Swedish Album Charts - 39
