= Marcus Bell (musician) =

American music producer, composer, and musician

Marcus "Bellringer" Bell also known as Marcus Bell or simply "Bellringer" is an American music producer, composer, and musician. He has worked with recording artists including Katy Perry, Italian pop star Gala, and Malaysian-Australian singer-songwriter Che'Nelle. Bell wrote and produced 3 songs on Che'Nelle's 2007 debut album Things Happen for a Reason.

== Biography ==
Bell was born in Norfolk, Virginia. His mother was Carolyn Williams Bell (1944–2018), a pioneer in the American Tennis Association in 1961. The two co-authored the book Bellringer Branding Bible: The 5 Musician Branding Principles for Singers, Rappers, DJs, Music Producers, Composers, Writers, and Recording Artists.

Raised in a musically rich environment, Bell began to learn the piano at the age of two. Bell attended Berklee College of Music where he graduated in 1996. By 2001, he was the music producer of his own duo The Sun Kings and their track "Maskerade" (Subliminal singer) featuring vocalist Diva Dash was mentioned as a "hot rising dance track" in Billboard Magazine on June 9 of that year.

== Career ==
=== Music, television, and film ===
As a producer Bellringer has acted and composed for television and film, and several of his songs were placed in major U.S. televised dramas since 2017. Two songs, "All That I Need (feat. SWEEDiSH)" and "This Is My Reality" (feat. Sweet Paul & Mr.W1N), were placed of Power in Season 4, Episode 7 (You Lied to My Face), which aired August 6, 2017, and two songs were placed on Empire. "Get On the Floor (ft. Cdubb)" aired on August 20, 2017, in Season 4, Episode 9 (That Ain't Me) and "Keep Steppin" (feat. Sophia Nicole) aired on February 11, 2015, in Season 1, Episode 6 (Out, Damned Spot).

Bell has collaborated with major recording artists as a composer/lyricist, including but not limited to, Katy Perry's album Witness, Nicki Minaj’s The Pinkprint, and has worked with celebrities across genres including Snoop Dogg. His work also extends to film and television, with recent contributions to the Starz series P-Valley, Netflix's Ginny & Georgia, and Operation Christmas Drop.

=== AI music ===
As the author of the Bellringer Branding Bible and the Unstoppable Workbook, Bellringer has been a featured guest on podcasts discussing the future of Web3 and AI technology in 2024.

=== Discography ===
The website AllMusic.com lists over 20 songs to his credits from 1981 to 2017 working with renowned artists such as Katy Perry, Nicki Minaj, and RZA, as well as lesser-known artists overseas and in the U.S. including producing and co-producing music with data scientist and composer Shelita Burke.

== Credits ==
| Year | Album/Single | Artist | Roles |
|---|---|---|---|
| 2024 | "11111 (Just Be the One)," debut single | Ravyn Lyte (AI artist and DJ) | Composer, lyricist, producer |
| 2017 | Witness | Katy Perry | Composer/Lyricist |
| 2014 | The Pinkprint | Nicki Minaj | Composer |
| 2009 | Tough Love | Gala | Mixing |
| 2009 | Tough Love EP | Gala | Mixing |
| 2007 | Jupiter's Dance [DVD/CD] | | Mixing |
| 2007 | Things Happen for a Reason | Che'Nelle | Additional Production, composer, producer |
| 2006 | Debbie/Jours Etran | Saez | Composer |
| 2006 | The Protector [Original Motion Picture Soundtrack] | RZA | Composer |
| 2004 | Hôtel De L'Univers/La Réalité | Raphaël | Composer |
| 2004 | Welcome to My World | Ski Johnson | Composer |
| 2003 | Dian Diaz [DNA] | Dian Diaz | Composer |
| 2003 | La Réalité | Raphaël | Composer |
| 2001 | Le Porte-Bonheur | La Grande Sophie | Sound Recording |
| 2001 | Lost & Found: Imagination, Vol. 1 | | Composer |
| 2000 | Jours Étranges | Saez | Producer, Mixing, Clavier, Basse, composer |
| 1999 | Un Paradis/Un Enfer | David Hallyday | Pre-Production |
| 1994 | Living in Oblivion: The 80's Greatest Hits, Vol. 3 | | Composer |
| 1987 | Horseshoe in the Glove | So | Guitar (Rhythm), composer |
| 1986 | 1st Down & Ten | Keep It Dark | Guitar (Bass) |
| 1981 | Breaking the Silence | The Opposition | Keyboards, Bass |
| n.d. | Dubstep [ZYX] | | Composer |
| n.d. | Penetrate | Shelita Burke | Producer, engineer, Mixing, Piano, Synthesizer, Drum Programming, Bass, Mastering, Additional Production, composer, Executive Producer |
| n.d. | Strictly 4 DJs, Vol. 6 | | Composer |
| n.d. | The Protector [Original Motion Picture Soundtrack] | | Composer |
| n.d. | Twój Wstyd | Mancu | Composer |
