= Hurry Up (song) =

Single by Che'Nelle

from the album Things Happen for a Reason
- Released: 2007
- Genre: R&B
- Length: 3:07
- Label: Capitol; EMI Japan; Positiva
- Songwriters: Sean Garrett; Warren Felder
- Producers: Sean Garrett; Warren Felder

Che'Nelle singles chronology
"I Fell in Love with the DJ" (2007)	"Hurry Up" (2007)	"First Love" (2008)

"Hurry Up" is a song by Australian singer Che'Nelle from her debut studio album, Things Happen for a Reason (2007). The song was released as the second single from the album. A music video was released for the song. The song was written and produced by both Sean Garrett and Warren Felder and was recorded in Atlanta, Georgia. The song received an official remix for its UK release featuring the rapper Tinchy Stryder.

== Background and composition ==
Che'Nelle recorded various demos that were uploaded online via the social networking website MySpace and these were shared across music forums. The artist's work came to the attention of record producers and she was flown to the US, signed and began work on her debut album. Che'Nelle's debut album titled Things Happen for a Reason was first released on 20 August 2007. "Hurry Up" was released as the second single from the album.

"Hurry Up" was written by Sean Garrett and Warren Felder. It was also produced by the duo and then recorded by Vernon J Mungo at Silent Studios based in Atlanta, Georgia. It received additional mixing from Phil Tan at Soapbox Studios also in Atlanta. In Japan a promotional CD was released with official artwork. In Europe another promotional CD was issued with different cover art and featured a main edit and instrumental of the song. In the UK it was released to radio as an official remix version featuring the rapper Tinchy Stryder. It was released via the EMI subsidiary label Positiva Records. The song was also issued to Russian radio stations on 10 March 2008, via Gala Records.

A music video for "Hurry Up" premiered on iTunes on 17 December 2007.

== Critical reception ==
Leslie Wilson from Gulf News said "Hurry Up" had the potential to be a "summer hit". She likened the "near-identical" sound to the other album tracks "Club Jumpin'" and "Teach Me How to Dance" and "Hurry Up" and believed it made them all sound repetitive. The UK remix of the song was featured on British DJ MistaJam's BBC Radio 1xtra "MistaJam Recommends" playlist. N. Lochy from DJ Booth described it as a "dance record, with noticeably fused elements of Hip-Hop and Reggae". They compared the sound of "Hurry Up" to the US singer Fergie. Lochy added that the song is attention grabbing and praised Garrett for producing a "busy beat perfect for holding the interest" of listeners.

A reviewer from Finland's Stara gave the song a one out of five rating. They were not impressed with the song's production and opined that there was crackling background noise in the song that distracts the listener. They said the song was so bad they needed to wear ear plugs.

== Track listing ==
- Digital download EP
1. "Hurry Up" (Extended Version) – 3:49
2. "Hurry Up" (DJ Q Remix) – 5:13
3. "Hurry Up" – 3:07
4. "I Fell In Love With the DJ" – 4:49
5. "I Fell In Love With the DJ" (T2 Remix) – 3:51
6. "I Fell In Love With the DJ" (T2 Dub) – 3:50

== Personnel ==
Credits adapted from the liner notes of Things Happen for a Reason.

- Cheryline Lim - vocals
- Sean Garrett - writer, producer
- Warren Felder - writer, producer
- Vernon J Mungo - recording
- Phil Tan - mixing

== Release history ==
Country	Date	Format
Worldwide	13 April 2008	Digital download
