= Baby I Love You (TEE song) =

2010 song by TEE

Single by TEE

from the album Kido I Raku
- Released: October 27, 2010
- Recorded: 2010
- Genre: J-Pop, Ballad
- Length: 5:07
- Label: Universal Sigma
- Songwriters: TEE; Hiro; Ryosuke Imai
- Producer: Akira

TEE singles chronology
"3度のメシより君が好き" (2010)	"Baby I Love You" (2010)	"電話で抱きしめて" (2011)

"Baby I Love You" or "Baby I Love U" (ベイビー・アイラブユー) is a song by Japanese singer TEE. It was released via Universal Sigma on 27 October 2010 and is included on TEE's debut album "Kido I Raku". The song was written by TEE, Hiro and Ryosuke Imai and was produced by Akira. Australian artist Che'Nelle translated and rewrote the song in English for inclusion on her third studio album "Luv Songs". EMI Music Japan released the song on 22 June 2011, as the third single taken from her album. Released by TEE, "Baby I Love You" peaked at number two on the Japan Hot 100 and has been certified triple platinum by RIAJ, selling over 750,000 copies. Che'Nelle's "Baby I Love U" peaked at twenty four on the Japan Hot 100 and remained on the chart for twenty four weeks. The version sold more than 500,000 ringtones, 500,000 PC downloads and 250,000 mobile downloads. RIAJ issued one platinum and two double platinum certifications to "Baby I Love You", indicating it had sold in excess of over 1.25 million copies by October 2013.

TEE and Che'Nelle also recorded a bilingual version in English and Japanese, which featured on both of their albums and peaked at number twelve on the Japan Hot 100. Both artists have granted other acts permission to cover the song. TEE features on a 2016 version commercially released by Toko Furuuchi. Che'Nelle collaborated with Shifta and featured the song on their joint mini-album "You and I". Che'Nelle also released a karaoke version of the song. She then ran a karaoke competition and received a nomination for Best Karaoke Song at the 2012 Japanese MTV VMAs. The song also gained popularity as a wedding song choice.

== Production and promotion ==
TEE had been studying at a university in Canada when he realised that he wanted to pursue music professionally. After the release of an EP release via producer Yoshiyuki Isao's record label, major recording companies entered into talks with TEE. He was signed to Universal Sigma and began working on his debut album "Kido I Raku". After the release of his first single in July, they pushed ahead with the next release "Baby I Love You". The song was written in Japanese by TEE, Hiro and Ryosuke Imai. It was produced by Akira. The album which features the song, "Kido I Raku" was released in Japan on 17 November 2010.

"Baby I Love You" entered the Japanese Oricon Singles Chart at number twenty two on 8 November 2010. It remained on the chart for fourteen weeks. The song peaked at number two on the Japan Hot 100. TEE filmed a music video to promote the release of the song. Universal Sigma released it to iTunes on 27 October 2010. The video features a female love interest and she also features on the official single cover art. The song was given extra promotion by being used as the closing theme for TBS music show Count Down TV in October 2010. TEE performed the song live at Tsutaya O-East. This version was included as a bonus track on his "Love's Beginning" EP.

"Baby I Love You" was later included on TEE's 2011 mini album of the same name. A duet version titled "Baby I Love You (Love with Che'Nelle)" was recorded and featured on both TEE and Che'Nelle's albums. In addition an official video was released to promote the song. On 26 November 2011, the singers duet version peaked on the Japan Hot 100, rising to number twelve. To promote the song TEE and Che'Nelle performed the song for a crowd of four thousand fans at Lazona Kawasaki Plaza.

In February 2014, RIAJ certified "Baby I Love You" as triple platinum after it sold more than 750,000 copies in Japan. As of 2018, TEE and Che'Nelle's solo releases and their duet version have earned "Baby I Love You" total sales figures of over 2.8 million.

In 2015 TEE released a song called "I Love You After Five Years". He has revealed he wrote the song as a sequel to "Baby I Love You", imagining what the song would sound like after the years have passed. The same video director and woman from the "Baby I Love You" video and cover art returned for the project.

== Track listing ==
- CD single, Digital download
1. "Baby I Love You" – 5:08
2. "Fighter" – 3:29
3. "Do your best" – 4:59

== Chart positions ==
Chart performance for "Baby I Love U"
Chart	Peak position
Japan (Oricon Singles Chart)	22
Japan (Japan Hot 100)	2

Chart entries where Che'Nelle duet is credited
Chart	Peak position
Japan (Japan Hot 100)	12

== Certifications ==
Region	Certification	Certified units/sales
Japan (RIAJ)	3× Platinum	750,000^{*}
^{*} Sales figures based on certification alone.

== Che'Nelle version ==
"Baby I Love U"

Single by Che'Nelle

from the album Luv Songs
- Released: June 22, 2011
- Recorded: 2010
- Studio: Sound City, Tokyo
- Genre: J-Pop, Ballad
- Length: 5:25
- Label: EMI Music Japan
- Songwriters: TEE; Hiro; Ryosuke Imai; Che'Nelle
- Producer: EIGO

Che'Nelle singles chronology
"So Sick" (2011)	"Baby I Love U" (2011)	"Story" (2012)

=== Production and promotion ===
The song was translated and rerecorded in English for Che'Nelle's third studio album "Luv Songs". The singer received a song writing credit for the English lyrics. It was produced by EIGO and recorded at the House of Che'Nelle studios in North Hollywood, California. It received additional recording and mixing by Shunsuke Shibusawa at Sound City in Tokyo. The guitar element added to the song was performed by Shinichi Endo. TEE was happy that "such a diva" as Che'Nelle wanted to have the song. Che'Nelle liked the song because it is a song "with emotions". She liked that the story of the song was developed like a real conversation. She revealed that the English lyrics were written to remain faithful to those featured in the Japanese version.

"Baby I Love U" was chosen as the third single from Che'Nelle's album. It was released via EMI Music Japan on 22 June 2011. To promote the single her record label produced an official music video which features Che'Nelle walking and singing around a house. A Japanese version also features on her album and an alternative music video was also released. In addition two official promotional CDs were released by EMI Music Japan. The first is a two track disc featuring the radio edit and album version. The second is an official remix titled "Baby I Love U - Winter Version". The song was used as the ending theme song for TV Tokyo's show "School - R" during July 2011. It was later used as the theme to Hiromi Kashiki's Mega Hit workout DVD, which was released via Che'Nelle's parent label Universal Music Japan.

On 24 August 2011, "Baby I Love U" peaked at number 21 on the Japan Hot 100 and remained on the chart for twenty four weeks. It also had strong sales in the ringtone download market, ranking at number one on Recochoku in August 2011. The song became one of Che'Nelle's most successful singles selling 250,000 full length track cell phone downloads, 500,000 ringtone sales by October 2012 and 500,000 digital downloads by October 2013. A deluxe remix EP was released in November 2011, with six variations of the song. Karaoke and instrumental versions of the song were released for digital download via iTunes. She promoted the song by running a karaoke contest in which applicants were required to submit their videos singing the track. It was run in partnership with Niconico and Che'Nelle chose the winner. The karaoke edition received a nomination for Best Karaoke Song at the 2012 MTV Video Music Awards Japan.

J-pop singer Namie Amuro writing for otocake.com called "Baby I Love U" a "passion version" and "the ultimate love song that you want to get married when you listen." A reporter from Tower Records branded it a "big hit" that crossed the boundaries of Western music and J-pop. A writer from the Japanese wedding application Recofoto described the song as "A Western-style cover" and said that Che'Nelle's emotional singing on the "pop melody" is ideal for a wedding reception. The song became the most popular wedding song on the application in 2013. Che'Nelle was happy that "Baby I Love U" resonated well as a wedding song and that she was part of many people's wedding days. A writer for the Music Lounge branded it a classic wedding song. Che'Nelle's version won the Most Popular Song / Artist award at the ISUM Bridal Music Award 2014.

=== Track listing ===
- Digital download
1. Baby I Love U – 5:22
- Digital download - karaoke
1. Baby I Love U (Instrumental With Click Intro) – 5:25
2. Baby I Love U (Karaoke With Click Intro) – 5:25
- Digital download - (Remixes) [Deluxe Edition]
1. Baby I Love U (Winter Version) – 5:48
2. Baby I Love U (Love with Tee) – 5:34
3. Baby I Love U (Instrumental) [With Click Intro] – 5:26
4. Baby I Love U (Karaoke Version) [With Click Intro] – 5:26
5. Baby I Love U (Winter Version) [Instrumental Version] [With Click Intro] – 5:50
6. Baby I Love U (Winter Version) [Karaoke Version] – 5:49

=== Personnel ===
Credits adapted from the liner notes of Luv Songs - Special Edition.

- Che'Nelle - lead vocals, writer
- TEE - writer
- Hiro - writer
- Ryosuke Imai - writer
- EIGO - producer
- Shunsuke Shibusawa - recording, mixing
- Shinichi Endo - guitar

=== Chart positions ===
Chart performance for "Baby I Love U"
Chart	Peak position
Japan (Japan Hot 100)	21
South Korea (Gaon Music Chart)	32

=== Certifications ===
Region	Certification	Certified units/sales
Japan (RIAJ)	2× Platinum	500,000^{*}
Japan (RIAJ) Ringtone downloads	2× Platinum	500,000^{*}
Japan (RIAJ) Mobile downloads	Platinum	250,000^{*}
^{*} Sales figures based on certification alone.

== Other versions ==
Two remixed versions of the song by DJ Kaori and DJ Komori were featured on Che'Nelle's 2013 Special Edition of "Luv Songs". In 2016, Che'Nelle recorded a reggae fushion version with Jamaican artist Shifta and it features on their collaborative album "You and I". A new version of the song titled "Baby I Love You (Last Session)" was included on TEE's 2015 album "I Love You 5 Years Later" (5年後のアイラブユー, 5-nengo no Ai Rabu Yū) . Toko Furuuchi later rerecorded the song with TEE and it was released as a single on 30 March 2016. The version was featured on her album "Toko Furuuchi with 10 legends" which is a concept album featuring covers with their original singers. J-pop duo Cream recorded a version titled "Baby I Love U (Creamix) and it was included on their 2013 EP "Wonderland". Japanese music group CODE-V covered the Japanese version of the song and it was included on their album Love & Harmony released on 30 March 2016. It has also been covered by Aili in 2012, by Miriho for his 2012 album "Green Go Light" and by Sayulee for her 2016 album "1st Songs". In South Korea, the song was included on Roo's album "62115" and features rapper Double K. On July 23, 2021, Kim Se-jeong – member of now-disbanded K-pop girl groups Gugudan and I.O.I – collaborated with Municon and released a cover.
