= I Fell in Love with the DJ =

"I Fell In Love With the DJ"

Single by Che'Nelle featuring Cham

from the album Things Happen for a Reason
- Released: 2 August 2007
- Genre: Reggae fusion; dancehall; R&B
- Length: 3:41
- Label: Capitol; Positiva
- Songwriters: Cheryline Lim; R. Kelly; B. O'Neil
- Producers: Cheryline Lim; Marcus Bell

Che'Nelle singles chronology
"I Fell In Love With the DJ" (2007)	"Hurry Up" (2007)

Cham singles chronology
"Tic Toc" (2006)	"I Fell in Love with the DJ" (2007)

"I Fell In Love With the DJ" is a song by Australian recording artist Che'Nelle from her debut studio album, Things Happen for a Reason (2007). The song was chosen as her first commercial single release. The song was originally written and recorded by Che'Nelle. The artist gained attention of US record producers and later signed an album deal. "I Fell In Love With the DJ" was remixed ahead of its release and Jamaican rapper Cham's vocals added. The song samples the 2005 song "Reggae Bump Bump", performed by American singer R. Kelly. It features "cheeky" lyrics about falling in love with a DJ at a nightclub. To promote the single Che'Nelle completed a US radio tour in forty states. The song did not perform well in the US, only peaking at number 98 on the Pop 100. It fared better in Japan and Europe, with it charting in several countries in the latter territory. Che'Nelle also refocused her efforts on promoting the single and album in Japan and its success helped her forge a long-standing career in the country.

== Background and composition ==
Che'Nelle recorded various demos which were uploaded online via the social networking website MySpace and these were shared across music forums. The artist's work came to the attention of record producers and she was flown to the US, signed and began work on her debut album.

Che'Nelle originally wrote and produced "I Fell In Love With the DJ" at her personal studio in Perth, Australia. The song was mixed by Andrew Dawson at Big Baby Studios in New York City, ready for its placement on Che'Nelle's debut album Things Happen for a Reason. The song samples "Reggae Bump Bump" which was originally recorded by American singer R. Kelly in 2005. This meant Kelly and his collaborator Bryan O'Neil received a songwriting accreditation for the track. The song received an official remix for commercial release which features the Jamaican rapper Cham. Derek Brin took over production for the mix and Andrew Dawson rerecorded it Sony Studios in New York. Additional recording took place at Madhouse Studios in Miami, Florida. Final mixing of the song took place at Big Baby Studios. The song serves as Things Happen for a Reason's lead single and opening album track. Che'Nelle also recorded the song in Malay titled "DJ Yang Ku Puja".

The song features "cheeky" lyrics, such as "(Sneak) Sneaking round the back door, Banging till we hear somebody say ooh ooh ooh". Che'Nelle told Aiko Ishikawa from Tower Records that the lyric was not based on her own personal experiences. She added that she wanted to create enjoyment for her female listeners. Che'Nelle has stated she sampled R. Kelly's song because of his conversational lyrics and believed that the melody was memorable.

To promote "I Fell In Love With the DJ", Che'Nelle embarked on a US radio tour and visited forty states. When the tour came to an end she was informed that the song was not performing well on US radio. Che'Nelle was upset but decided to refocus her attention on releasing her album in Japan and Europe. The song began to rise in popularity in Japan and she traveled to the country to promote it further. The singer has credited the song for helping to launch her long career in the country. The song also helped Che'Nelle achieve breakout success in Sri Lanka. In late July 2007, the song was issued to radio stations in Che'Nelle's birth country Malaysia.

== Critical reception ==
Chris Richards of The Washington Post described the song as a "high-fructose goody from an Australian reggae chanteuse who falls for the mysterious man in the DJ booth." He described the narrative of the song as "summer love". Their colleague Cynthia Kopkowski added that "I Fell In Love With the DJ" was ideal for a beach party playlist. A writer for the "South Eastern Discotheque Association" described it as "Caribbean influenced" song ideal for summer months. They added it has a "very commercial lyric" and "It is simply constructed, but that makes it all the better." Angie Romero from Vibe magazine branded the song a "humorous tale about two-timing" a lover.

== Music video ==
The music video to "I Fell In Love With the DJ" was released to iTunes on 28 August 2007. The music video is located in a party setting where Che'Nelle is dancing. Liz Friedlander directed the video.

== Track listing ==
- Digital download
1. I Fell In Love With the DJ (Live) – 3:39
- Digital EP
1. "I Fell In Love With the DJ" (Cham Radio Edit) [feat. Cham] – 3:42
2. "I Fell In Love With the DJ" (Cham Extended) [feat. Cham] – 4:49
3. "I Fell In Love With the DJ" (Cham Extended Instrumental) [feat. Cham] – 4:49
- UK CD single
1. "I Fell In Love With the DJ" UK Radio edit (feat. Cham) – 3:11
2. "I Fell In Love With the DJ" UK Extended mix (feat. Cham) – 4:44
3. "I Fell In Love With the DJ" Extended Instrumental – 4:44
- 12" Vinyl
1. "I Fell In Love With the DJ" (Cham Radio Edit) – 3:40
2. "I Fell In Love With the DJ" (Cham Extended) – 4:44
3. "I Fell In Love With the DJ" (Cham Extended Instrumental) – 4:44
4. "I Fell In Love With the DJ" (Che'Nelle Album Radio Edit) – 3:28

== Credits and personnel ==
Credits adapted from the liner notes of Things Happen for a Reason.

- Cheryline Lim - writer, producer, vocals
- Cham - writer, vocals
- Robert Kelly - writer
- Bryan O'Neil - writer
- Andrew Dawson - mixing
- Derek Brin - mixing, producer
- Dave Kelly - writer, additional recording

== Chart performance ==
In France, the song debuted and peaked at number thirty and on Portugal's national chart it peaked at number thirty-three. In Sweden, the song peaked at number forty-seven. On Hungary's Rádiós Top 40 the song entered the chart number 35. The song failed to perform well on the US radio charts, but did peak on the Billboard Pop 100 chart at 98.

== Charts ==
Chart	Peak position
Australia (ARIA)	62
France (SNEP)	30
Hungary (Rádiós Top 40)	35
Portugal (Portugal Top 20)	33
Romania (Romanian Top 100)	11
Sweden (Sverigetopplistan)	47
U.S. Billboard Pop 100	98

== Release history ==
Country	Date	Format
Australia	20 October 2007	Digital download
United Kingdom	3 December 2007	CD single
