= Cham (singer) =

Jamaican musician

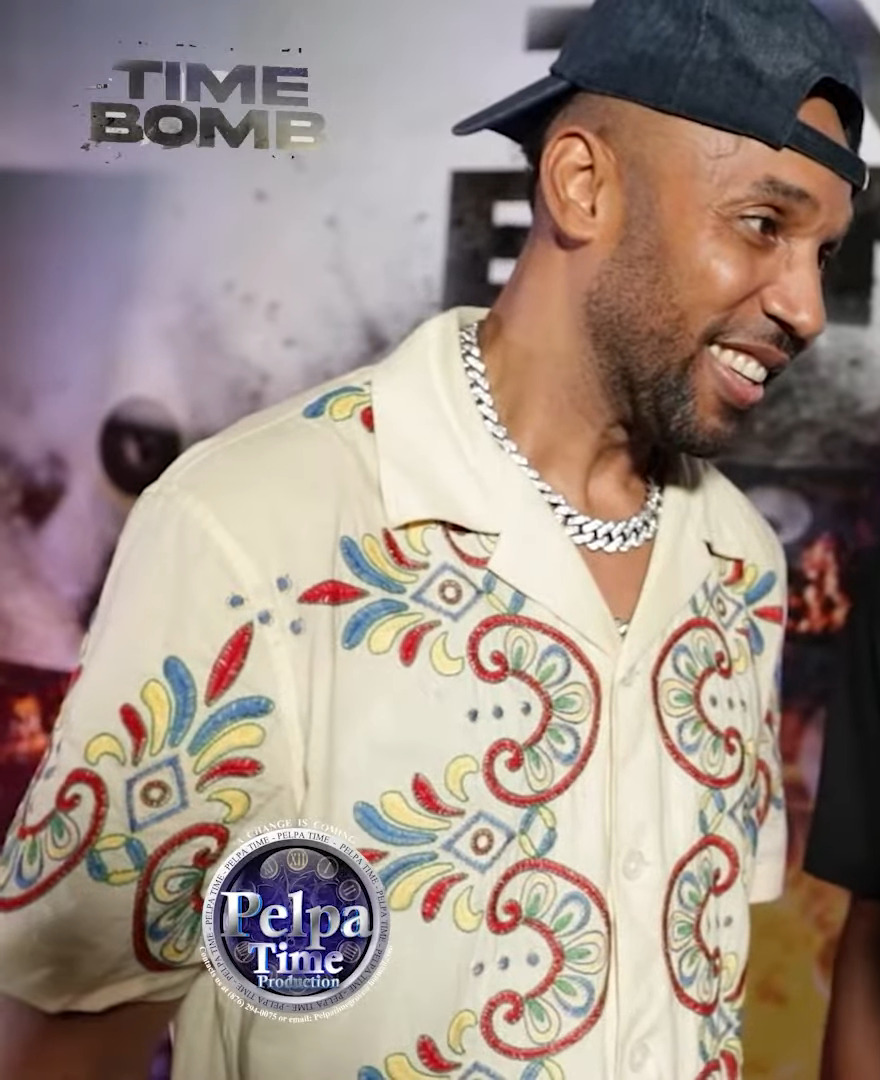
- Cham in 2025

Background information
- Also known as: Baby Cham
- Born: Damian Beckett; 24 February 1977 (age 49)
- Origin: Saint Andrew Parish, Jamaica
- Genres: Reggae, dancehall, reggae fusion
- Occupations: Deejay, singer, songwriter, record producer
- Years active: 1994–present
- Labels: Atlantic, Madhouse

Cham (born Damian Beckett, 24 February 1977) is a Jamaican-born dancehall singer, mostly known for his 2006 single "Ghetto Story" from his major label debut album of the same name, a song which led to multiple "story" songs by other artists in a similar vein. He is currently signed to Atlantic Records, and was known as Baby Cham until 2005. He is still called Baby Cham by his fans from around the world despite the name change.

== Biography ==
Originally from Sherlock Crescent in Saint Andrew Parish, Cham's career began in the early 1990s. The Miami New Times referred to his debut album Wow... The Story, released in 2000, as "the most anticipated album in years from any reggae artist", and a Washington Post review of a live Cham concert in 2006 described him as "the man who may be the next Sean Paul – a dancehall artist who crosses over to the U.S. hip-hop market."

Throughout his career, Cham has collaborated with many hip hop and R&B artists such as Foxy Brown, Alicia Keys, Carl Thomas, Shawn Mims, Mis-Teeq, Rihanna, Che'Nelle, Jentina, Akon, and T-Pain, Keke Palmer and many others.

Cham has for a long time worked with producer Dave Kelly. In 2012, he recorded with his wife, O, on the singles "Wine" and "Tun Up". In 2013 he released the Kelly-produced single "Fighter", featuring Damian "Junior Gong" Marley.

Cham's third album, the Kelly-produced Lawless was due to be released in June 2015. Featuring the single "I Am Hot", the album was recorded in Florida apart from a collaboration with Mykal Rose and Bounty Killer, which was recorded in Jamaica.

== Discography ==
=== Albums ===
Album information
Wow... The Story
- Released: 24 October 2000
- Label: Artists Only Records/Madhouse/So So Def
- Worldwide sales: N/A
Ghetto Story
- Released: 15 August 2006
- Label: Atlantic Records/Madhouse/Asylum Records
- Chart positions: No. 53 US
- Worldwide sales: 200,000

=== Singles ===
Year	Song	Peak chart positions					Album
Year	Song	JAM Air.	US Hot 100	US R&B	US Rap	UK Singles	Album
1997	"Warm Jamaican Christmas" (with Wayne Wonder)	2	—	—	—	—	Warm Jamaican Christmas
2000	"The Mass"	*	—	—	—	—	Wow... The Story
2000	"Funny Man"	*	—	—	—	—	Wow... The Story
2000	"Ghetto Pledge"	*	—	—	—	—	Wow... The Story
2000	"Boom/Can I Get A"	*	—	—	—	—	Wow... The Story
2006	"Ghetto Story"	*	99	—	—	—	Ghetto Story
2006	"Ghetto Story Chapter 2" (featuring Alicia Keys)	*	77	22	13	62	Ghetto Story
2006	"Vitamin S"	*	—	56	—	—	Ghetto Story
2006	"Rude Boy Pledge"	*	—	—	—	—	Ghetto Story
2006	"Tic Toc"	*	—	—	—	—	Ghetto Story
2013	"Fighter"	*	—	—	—	—	My Life
"—" denotes a recording that did not chart or was not released in that territory. "*" denotes that the chart did not exist at that time.

=== As featured artist ===
- "Shottas" T-Pain featuring Cham and Kardinal Offishall
- "This Is Why I'm Hot" (Remix) Mims featuring Junior Reid and Cham
- "The Day Before" Baby Blue Soundcrew featuring Jully Black & Cham
- "Oh No (You Can't Be Serious)" Carl Thomas featuring Cham
- "Tables Will Turn" Foxy Brown featuring Cham
- "Party Time" (Remix) Lukie D featuring Cham and Jadakiss
- "Love Is on My Mind" Shawnna featuring Cham and Sisqo
- "Run Dem" Foxy Brown featuring Cham
- "Never Never" (Remix) Brick & Lace featuring Cham
- "I Fell in Love with the DJ" Che'Nelle featuring Cham
- "Tonight" Keke Palmer featuring Cham
- "Girl I Need" Mario featuring Cham
- "Bullet" DJ Khaled featuring Cham and Rick Ross
- "That's Just Not Me" Mis-Teeq featuring Baby Cham
- "Bad Ass Strippa" (Remix) Jentina featuring Cham
