= Rebelution (Tanya Stephens album) =

Studio album by Tanya Stephens
- Released: August 29, 2006
- Recorded: 2004–2006
- Genres: Dancehall, reggae, pop rock, dance
- Length: 68:22
- Label: VP/Tarantula Records
- Producers: Andrew Henton, Barry O'Hare, Neil Amos, Romain "Sherkhan" Chiffre

Tanya Stephens chronology
Gangsta Blues (2004)	Rebelution (2006)	Infallible (2010)

Singles from Rebelution
- 1. "These Streets" Released: July 31, 2006; 2. "What a Day" Released: August 7, 2006

Rebelution is Tanya Stephens' sixth album, released more than two years after her last release, Gangsta Blues. Production came from (among others) her life partner Andrew Henton.

== Track listing ==
No.	Title	Length
1.	"Welcome to the Rebelution" (Intro)	02:38
2.	"Who Is Tanya"	03:15
3.	"Put It on You"	03:17
4.	"The Message" (Skit)	00:39
5.	"Still a Go Lose"	03:46
6.	"To the Rescue"	03:53
7.	"Damn You"	03:57
8.	"The Truth"	04:41
9.	"Spilt Milk"	03:54
10.	"Saturday Morning" (Skit)	02:04
11.	"Cherry Brandy"	03:53
12.	"Sunday Morning" (Skit)	01:55
13.	"You Keep Looking Up"	03:52
14.	"Come a Long Way"	03:22
15.	"Do You Still Care?"	05:33
16.	"Warn Dem"	04:08
17.	"To the Limit"	03:14
18.	"These Streets"	03:54
19.	"Home Alone"	03:41
20.	"Don't Play"	04:33
Total length:		68:22

All acoustic tracks & music videos from the DVD are from Rebelution unless otherwise stated.

Bonus DVD: Stripped-Down
No.	Title	Length
1.	"I Am Woman" (Acoustic, from Gangsta Blues)	01:23
2.	"Interview #1"	02:19
3.	"Can't Breathe" (Acoustic, from Gangsta Blues)	05:18
4.	"Interview #2"	00:58
5.	"It's a Pity" (Acoustic, from Gangsta Blues)	05:17
6.	"To the Rescue" (Acoustic)	04:07
7.	"Interview #3"	01:34
8.	"Damn You" (Acoustic)	03:44
9.	"Interview #4"	01:05
10.	"Cherry Brandy" (Acoustic)	05:18
11.	"Interview #5"	05:36
12.	"Interview #6"	01:03
13.	"Do You Still Care?"	05:22
14.	"These Streets" (Acoustic)	05:23
15.	"Warn Dem" (Music video)	03:44
16.	"It's a Pity" (Music video, from Gangsta Blues)	04:20
Total length:		52:02

== Personnel ==
- Andrew Henton - drums/production
- Rick Sabo - guitar
- Delroy "Delly" Golding - percussion
- Oliver Chastan - executive producer
- Barry O'Hare - producer
- Romain "Sherkhan" Chiffre - production, guitars and mixing engineer
- Ivan Evangelista - audio engineer
- Jean Luc Cohen - mixing engineer
- Tanya Stephens - writing/production

DVD

- Andrew Henton - drums/production
- Rick Sabo - guitar
- Delroy "Delly" Golding - percussion
- Oliver Chastan - executive producer/director
- Alex Kane - director/camera operator
- Barry O'Hare - producer
- Sherkan - guitar
- Ivan Evangelista - audio engineer
- Tanya Stephens - writing/production

== Chart History ==
Country	Position	Weeks in chart
US	11	16
