= Erik Nelson (songwriter) =

- Born: Erik Nelson
- Genres: Pop, rock, R&B, soul, alternative dance, hip hop
- Occupations: music producer, songwriter, arranger, vocal producer, Recording Engineer
- Years active: 1994–present
- Label: The Insomniax

Erik Nelson is an American Grammy-nominated songwriter, music producer and recording engineer. His first commercial studio, Sinewave Studios, opened in 1994 in Bloomington, IL. It was at Sinewave that Nelson recorded, mixed and mastered the EP "Kill, I Oughtta" for Mudvayne. After Mudvayne's major label debut "L.D. 50", their label, Epic, re-released "Kill, I Oughtta" under the title "The Beginning of All Things to End" with some additional remixes from "L.D. 50".

Sinewave Studios closed in 1999, and Nelson opened Eclipse Studios in Normal, IL in June 2000.

In 2005, Nelson created the songwriting/production duo The Insomniax along with partner Emile Ghantous. The Insomniax quickly began working with major recording artists Boyz II Men (MSM Records), JoJo (Blackground/Universal), 3LW (So So Def/Jive), Bobby V (formerly Bobby Valentino) (Disturbing The Peace/Def Jam), Jon B (Yab Yum/Epic), B5 (Bad Boy Records), Fat Joe (Atlantic Records), R. Kelly (Jive Records), Ralph Tresvant (of New Edition), 2XL (Tommy Boy Records), Karina Pasian (Def Jam Records), Lemarvin (Motown Records), I-15 (Interscope Records), Na'Shay, Nephu, Aksent (Capitol Records), AI (Def Jam Japan), Lil Romeo (No Limit Records), and many others.

In 2010, Nelson worked with R&B legend Charlie Wilson, of the Gap Band. He wrote and produced "Never Got Enough" and "Throw It Away" from the album Just Charlie on RCA Records. It was during this time that Nelson co-wrote "Addicted" for Prince Royce (RCA), with Nasri Atweh (Lead singer of Magic!), which ended up on Royce's album "Phase II" and "Number One's", both of which went platinum.

In 2015, Nelson was Grammy nominated for "Best R&B Album" and received an NAACP award for "Best R&B Album" and "Song of the year" for the Top 5 Urban AC hit song "Goodnight Kisses" for Charlie Wilson.

In 2019, the Boyz II Men song "Here I Come", co-written and co-produced by Nelson was chosen to be in the Lionsgate film "Long Shot", Starring Seth Rogan and Charlize Theron.

Nelson currently engineers all of Montana of 300's recordings, including the album "Rap God" (reached #1 on iTunes) as well as Mario Canon (featured on Empire on FOX), and does music and sound design for Big Daddy Games.
