= Lecca (singer) =

Japanese singer and politician

Reina Saito

Member of the Tokyo Metropolitan Assembly
- In office July 23, 2017 – July 22, 2021
- Constituency: Okutama

Personal details
- Born: 26 February 1979 (age 47) Koto, Tokyo, Japan
- Party: Tomin First no Kai (2017–2019); Independent (2019–2021); CDP (2021–present)

lecca
- Born: Japan・Tokyo
- Genres: Reggae
- Years active: 2000 - present
- Label: Cutting Edge
- Website: lecca official web site

Lecca (pronounced "Rekka") is a Japanese politician and singer who debuted in 2005.

== Discography ==
=== Albums ===
Title	Album details	Peak position (Oricon)	Sales
lecca (烈火; Fire)	Release Date: February 15, 2005 Label: ALPHA Enterprize	#287	
URBAN PIRATES	Release Date: August 23, 2006 Label: cutting edge	#57	
Otaku girls no Utage (おたくgirlsの宴; Party of Home Girls)	Release Date: August 1, 2007 Label: cutting edge	#33	
City Caravan	Release Date: July 20, 2008 Label: cutting edge	#18	
BIG POPPER	Release Date: August 15, 2009 Label: cutting edge	#7	102,818
Power Butterfly (パワーバタフライ)	Release Date: August 27, 2010 Label: cutting edge	#4	105,440
Step One	Release Date: January 25, 2012 Label: cutting edge	#7	20,749
ZOOLANDER	Release Date: December 12, 2012 Label: cutting edge	#21	8,213
TOP JUNCTION	Release Date: December 11, 2013 Label: cutting edge	#21	9,304
tough Village	Release Date: August 6, 2014 Label: cutting edge	#17	8,016
Maemuki (前向き; Forward)	Release Date: August 26, 2015 Label: cutting edge	#18	5,272
High Street	Release Date: March 1, 2017 Label: cutting edge	#20	N/A
LIBERTY ERA	Release Date: February 28, 2024 Label: cutting edge	N/A	N/A

Maxi Singles

Title	Album details	Peak position (Oricon)	Sales
For You	Release Date: March 4, 2009 Label: cutting edge	#34	N/A
My measure	Release Date: November 18, 2009 Label: cutting edge	#13	N/A
TSUBOMI feat Kusuo (九州男)/SNOW CRYSTALS	Release Date: April 28, 2010 Label: cutting edge	#13	N/A
Right Direction	Release Date: December 7, 2011 Label: cutting edge	#49	N/A

=== Mini-Albums ===
Dreamer (2006)
Mado no Mukou (マドのむこう) (2008)
Hakobune (箱舟) ~ballads in me~ (2011)
