= Che'Nelle =

Australian singer-songwriter (born 1982)

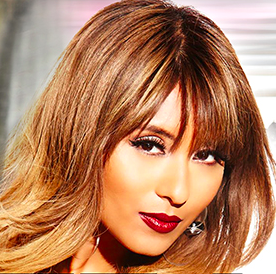

Background information
- Born: Cheryline Ernestine Lim; 1983 (age 43); Kota Kinabalu, Sabah, Malaysia
- Genres: R&B; dancehall; dance; hip hop; reggae; Jpop
- Occupation: Singer-songwriter
- Years active: 2006–present
- Labels: Capitol; EMI; Delicious Deli; Virgin; Avex Trax
- Spouse: Grandison Phelps IV
- Website: chenelleworld.com

Cheryline Lim Phelps, known by her stage name Che'Nelle, is an Australian singer-songwriter. She gained popularity in Japan with the release of her debut studio album, Things Happen for a Reason (2007).

== Early life ==
Cheryline Ernestine Lim was born to a Chinese father, and a mother of Indian and Dutch heritage. Born in Kota Kinabalu, Sabah, Malaysia, Lim and her family moved to Perth, Australia when she was 10 years old. As a child she gained the attention of her father after singing in his karaoke lounge, seeing her talent. She later started writing and producing her own music in her home studio. Sir Charles Dixon discovered her talents, after she uploaded some of her music onto Myspace. Dixon took her material to Virgin Records and Virgin flew Che'nelle to New York City at the end of 2005 to meet with representatives from the label. The chairman of the label and longtime music business baron, Jason Flom, signed her immediately. Within two days, she had completed the deal and was marketed as a world-class artist. Che'nelle worked as a promotions assistant before moving to New York in January after signing a six-album deal with Virgin Records America. In Australia, she is represented by EMI.

== Career ==
=== 2006–2008: Things Happen for a Reason ===
She performed as the opening act on American rapper Kanye West's Australian tour in March 2006.

Her debut album Things Happen for a Reason was released on 25 September 2007 in Japan and 29 October 2007 in Australia. The first single from this album was "I Fell in Love with the DJ" featuring reggae artist Cham. The song was also produced in Bahasa Malaysia with the title of "DJ yang Ku Puja".

She also co-wrote American singer and former Pussycat Dolls member Carmit Bachar's song "Fierce", Australian singer Ricki-Lee Coulter's debut single "Hell No!" and English singer Leona Lewis's song "Can't Breathe".

=== 2009–present ===
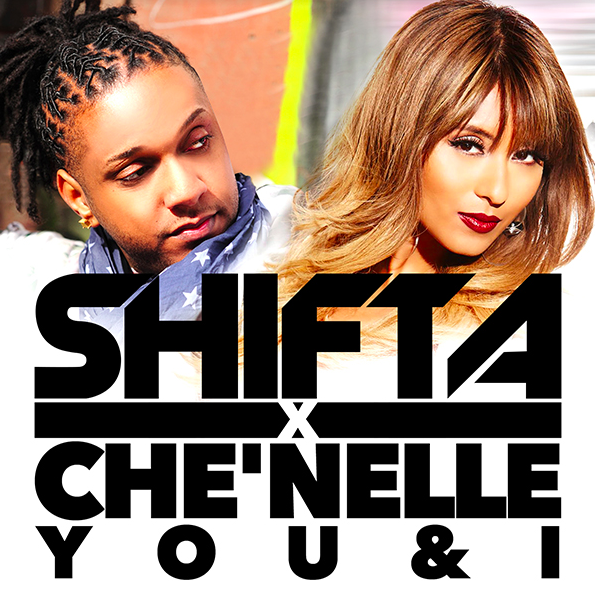
Artwork for "You & I" by Shifta and Che'Nelle (2016)

Her second album was later confirmed and given the working title Feel Good, named after the first single from the album.

The first single "Feel Good" from this album is strongly influenced by reggae and dancehall music just like her first single "I Fell in Love with the DJ" from her debut album (Things Happen for a Reason, 2007) which features Jamaican dancehall artist "Cham". The music video for "Feel Good" premiered online on 11 January 2010.

The album Feel Good was released on 10 February 2010 in Japan via EMI Japan.

The album garnered the singles "Feel Good" and "Missing".

Her third album and first cover album, called Luv Songs was released on 20 July 2011 in Japan only, which featured covers of songs by American R&B singers such as Ne-Yo, Minnie Ripperton and Whitney Houston and also songs in Japanese.

In 2015, Che'Nelle was invited to the touring ice show Fantasy on Ice, where she performed live with figure skater and two-time Olympic champion, Yuzuru Hanyu, to the song "Believe" amongst others.

In 2017, Che'Nelle completed her contract with Universal Music Japan sublabel Virgin Music.

In 2023, Che'Nelle announced she signed with Avex Trax. Her first single under the label, "I Am", was released in December.

In 2025, Che'Nelle was featured in the third version of New Zealand band Drax Project's song "Woke Up Late" as part of their promotion tour in Japan. To mark its release, several photos and video clips were uploaded on her Instagram account that depicted her in the studio recording her vocals and at the Sydney Park singing with the band. It marked her first Trans-Tasman release since relocating in Japan.

== Discography ==
- Things Happen for a Reason (2007)
- Feel Good (2009)
- Believe (2011)
- Aishiteru (2013)
- @Chenelleworld (2015)
- Destiny (2017)
- Metamorphosis (2017)

== Filmography ==
Title	Year	Role	Notes
"The Waste"	2010	Alien Harlot	Short movie
"Multifarious"	2010	Maria	Short movie
"A Hollywood Zone"	2011	Alicia	Short movie
"Ava"	2013	herself	Short movie
"Bond: Kizuna"	2019	Mew	Movie

== Awards and nominations ==
List of awards received by Che'Nelle
Award	Year	Nomination	Nominated work	Result
Japan Gold Disc Award	2008	Top New Artist	Che'Nelle	Won
Japan Gold Disc Award	2012	Concept Album of the Year	Luv Songs	Won
MTV Video Music Awards Japan	2012	Best Karaokee! Song	"Baby I Love U"	Nominated
Japan Gold Disc Awards	2013	Western Artist of the Year	Che'Nelle	Won
Japan Gold Disc Awards	2013	Western Album of the Year	"Believe"	Won
Japan Gold Disc Awards	2013	Song of the Year by Download	"Believe"	Won
Japan Gold Disc Awards	2013	Best 3 Western Albums	"Believe"	Won
