= Madhouse Records (Jamaican record label) =

Jamaican record label

- Founded: 1993
- Founder: Dave Kelly, Janet Davidson
- Status: Active
- Genre: Dancehall, ragga, reggae
- Country of origin: Jamaica
- Official website: http://www.madhouserecords.com

Madhouse Records is a record label founded by Dave Kelly and his business partner Janet Davidson. The label was named after its out-of-the-box approach to making music, which earned the label the name Madhouse. In 1987, Janet was living in London, running Germain Music along with producer Donovan Germain. She was also the manager of Maxi Priest. Dave's brother Anthony "Tony" Kelly was assistant engineer at Bob Marley's Tuff Gong label and Dave soon joined him there, learning the trade of engineering. Soon, the Kelly brothers joined Maxi Priest on the road as tour engineers. In 1988, Dave Kelly partnered with Germain to start Penthouse Productions, where he worked out of Penthouse studios as engineer, producer, writer, mixer, and beat maker for the label's records, playing a crucial role during Penthouse's glory days.

In 1993, Janet and Dave decided to leave Penthouse and start their own label, Madhouse Records. Janet ran the label and Dave made the records. They had success with Terror Fabulous, which signed them a record deal at major, East West America/Atlantic Records, which resulted in his album Yaga Yaga.

The label opened its own offices and the Boxx studio in 1996 in Kingston, Jamaica, which was the regular base for recording acts such as Buju Banton, Beenie Man, Bounty Killer, Baby Cham, Spragga Benz, Wayne Wonder, Lady Saw, Mr. Easy, Shaggy and Frisco Kid in the late 1990s.

Madhouse created the Bogle, Pepper Seed, Joyride, Showtime, Fiesta, The Bug, Arab, Mi Nuh Know, Heartbeat, Medicine, Stink, Rae Rae, Haunted, and Eighty-Five riddims. Some of the biggest hits on the label were "Action" by Terror Fabulous & Nadine Sutherland, "Sycamore Tree" by Lady Saw, "Dude" by Beenie Man & Ms. Thing, "Slam" by Beenie Man, and "Ghetto Story" by Cham. In 2003, Madhouse signed a label deal with Atlantic Records, which released Baby Cham's Ghetto Story album.

== Artists ==
- Baby Cham - Jamaican dancehall reggae artist from Kingston, Jamaica, who signed with Atlantic Records in 2005.
- Alias - a band formed by Wayne Wonder along with Dave Kelly, Baby Cham, Frisco Kid and Frankie Sly, and later Entourage.

== Former artists ==
- Buju Banton - Jamaican dancehall ragga and reggae singer.
- Spragga Benz - Jamaican dancehall ragga artist hailing from Kingston, Jamaica.
- Wayne Wonder - Jamaican reggae and R&B artist from Kingston, Jamaica.
- Lady Saw - Jamaican dancehall artist known as the first lady of dancehall.
- Tanya Stephens - Jamaican dancehall and reggae singer known as one of the genre's most influential artists.
- Pinchers - Jamaican dancehall and reggae artist.
- Spice - Jamaican dancehall artist.
- Sean Paul

== Producers and engineers ==
- Dave Kelly — songwriter, musician, producer and engineer from Kingston, Jamaica, and the co-founder of Madhouse Records.
- Janet Davidson — a business manager from London, England, who, alongside Dave Kelly, helped found Madhouse Records.

== See also ==
- List of record labels
