= Dave Kelly (producer) =

Jamaican record producer

- Also known as: The Stranger
- Genres: Dancehall reggae
- Occupations: Record producer, songwriter, instrumentalist, engineer, and mixer
- Years active: 1992–present
- Labels: Penthouse Studios, Madhouse Records

Dave Kelly is a Jamaican record producer and the brother of record producer Tony "CD" Kelly. He began his career as an engineer in the late 1980s. After getting into producing at the Penthouse label of Donovan Germain, he started his own label, Madhouse, together with business partner Janet Davidson in 1991. He went on to become one of the most successful dancehall reggae producers in Jamaica, recording numerous songs that topped the local and international reggae charts, such as "Action" by Nadine Sutherland & Terror Fabulous in 1994 and "Look" by Bounty Killer in 1999.

Dave Kelly has released some of the most popular and influential dancehall riddims such as Joy Ride, Showtime, Fiesta, and Eighty-Five. He produced Beenie Man's international hit "Dude" featuring Ms. Thing in 2003 on the Fiesta riddim, which was featured on Beenie Man's album Back to Basics and Baby Cham's major hit "Ghetto Story," on the Eighty-Five riddim, which was the title track of Baby Cham's 2006 album that he also produced. He is also the producer of Buju Banton's 2020 Track "Blessed".

== See also ==
- Madhouse Records (Jamaican record label)
