= Beenie Man discography =

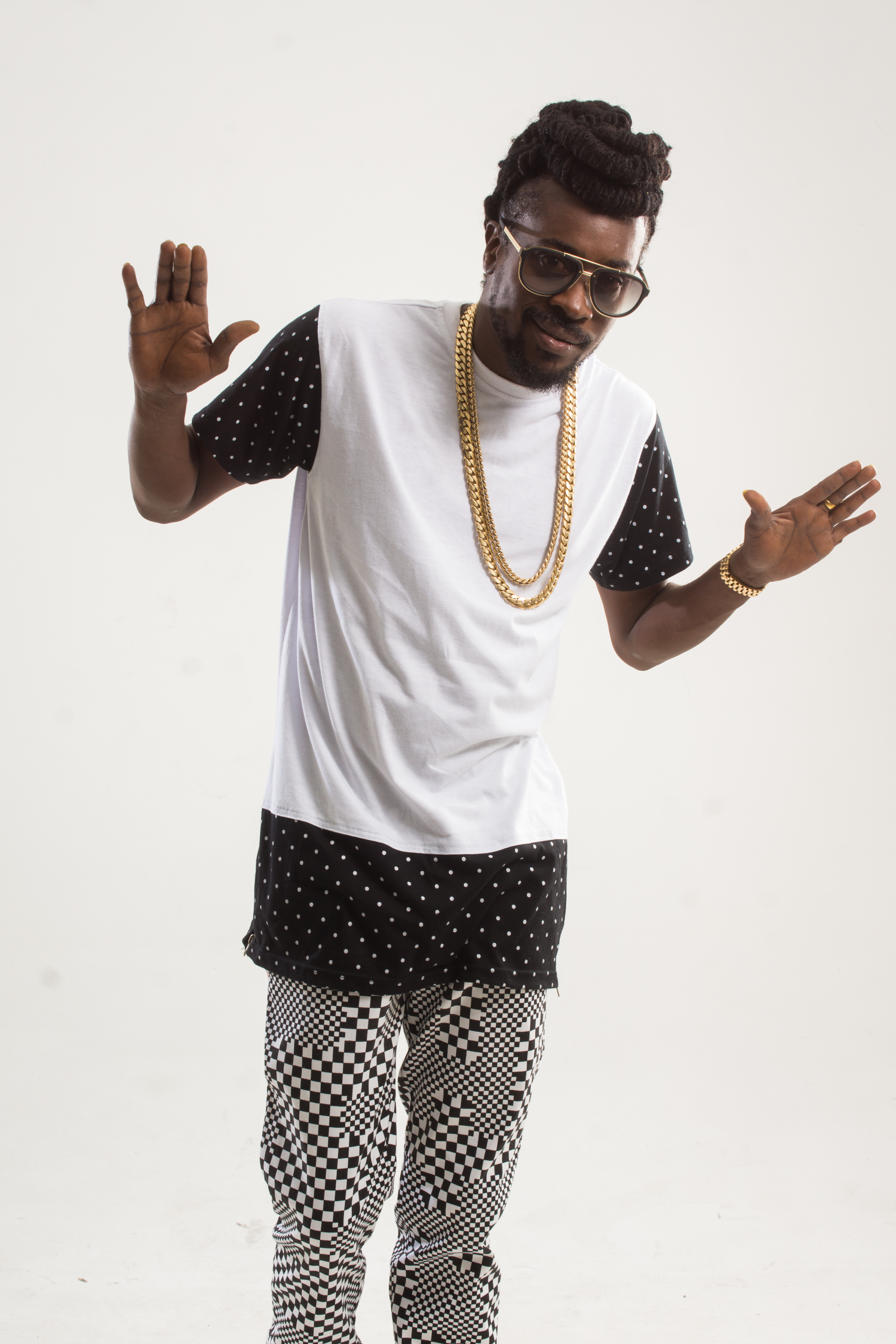
- Beenie Man in 2017
- Studio albums: 18
- Live albums: 2
- Compilation albums: 7
- Singles: 52

Jamaican dancehall and reggae artist Beenie Man has released eighteen studio albums, two live albums, seven compilation albums and fifty-two singles (including thirty-one as a featured artist).

== Albums ==
=== Studio albums ===
List of studio albums, with selected chart positions and sales figures
Title	Album details	Peak chart positions								Sales
Title	Album details	FRA	GER	NLD	SWI	UK	US	US R&B	US Reggae	Sales
The Invincible Beany Man - The 10 Year Old D.J. Wonder	Released: 1983; Label: Bunny Lee; Formats: CD, LP, digital download	—	—	—	—	—	—	—	—	
Cool Cool Rider	Released: December 4, 1992; Label: VP; Formats: CD, LP, digital download, streaming	—	—	—	—	—	—	—	—	
Defend It	Released: March 4, 1994; Label: VP; Formats: CD, LP, digital download, streaming	—	—	—	—	—	—	—	—	
Dis Unu Fi Hear	Released: September 25, 1994; Label: Hightone; Formats: CD, LP, digital download	—	—	—	—	—	—	—	—	
Blessed	Released: July 17, 1995; Label: Island; Formats: CD, LP, digital download, streaming	—	—	—	—	—	—	—	12	
Beenie Man Meets Mad Cobra	Released: September 5, 1995; Label: VP; Formats: CD, LP, digital download, streaming	—	—	—	—	—	—	—	—	
Maestro	Released: December 16, 1996; Labels: Greensleeves, VP; Formats: CD, LP, digital download, streaming	—	—	—	—	—	—	—	3	
Many Moods of Moses	Released: December 9, 1997; Labels: VP, Slammin' Vinyl; Formats: CD, LP, digital download, streaming	—	—	—	—	—	151	35	1	
Ruff 'N' Tuff	Released: April 6, 1999; Label: Fuel 2000; Formats: CD, LP, digital download	—	—	—	—	—	—	—	5	
The Doctor	Released: May 18, 1999; Label: VP, Slammin' Vinyl; Formats: CD, LP, digital download, streaming	—	—	—	—	—	—	55	1	
Y2K	Released: September 14, 1999; Label: Artists Only; Formats: CD, LP, digital download	—	—	—	—	—	—	—	11	
Art and Life	Released: July 11, 2000; Label: Virgin; Formats: CD, LP, digital download, streaming	—	—	—	—	—	68	18	1	US: 386,000
Youth Quake	Released: October 2, 2001; Label: Artists Only; Formats: CD, LP, digital download	—	—	—	—	—	—	—	10	
The Magnificent	Released: March 26, 2002; Label: 2B1 Multimedia; Formats: CD, LP, digital download	—	—	—	—	—	—	—	—	
Tropical Storm	Released: August 20, 2002; Label: Virgin; Formats: CD, LP, digital download, streaming	130	95	—	—	100	18	7	1	
Back to Basics	Released: July 13, 2004; Label: Virgin; Formats: CD, LP, digital download, streaming	147	—	91	88	128	51	7	1	
Concept of Life	Released: January 25, 2006; Label: Corner Shop; Formats: CD, LP, digital download	—	—	—	—	—	—	—	—	
Undisputed	Released: August 25, 2006; Label: Virgin; Formats: CD, LP, digital download, streaming	146	—	—	—	—	65	12	1	
"—" denotes a recording that did not chart or was not released in that territory.

== Compilations ==
Year	Album	Chart peaks	
Year	Album	US R&B	US Reggae
1995	All the Best: Released: May 23, 1995; Label: Peter Pan	—	—
1999	Wild Wild: Released: October 1, 1999; Label: Rhino	—	—
2000	Best of Beenie Man: Released: December 12, 2000; Label: VP	—	4
2002	The Very Best of Beenie Man: Gold: Released: January 1, 2002; Label: Jet Star Music	—	—
2005	Kingston to King of the Dancehall: A Collection of Dancehall Favorites: Released: February 1, 2005; Label: Virgin	60	3
2005	Hundred Dollar Bag: Released: May 30, 2005; Label: Self-released	—	—
2007	Monsters of Dancehall: Released: May 21, 2007; Label: Greensleeves	—	—

=== Riddim Album Compilation features ===
Beenie Man throughout his music career has featured on at least 800 riddim/rhythm productions from various reggae and dancehall producers worldwide dating back to the early 1990s to present date.

== Collaboration albums ==
- 1994: Guns Out (versus Bounty Killer)
- 1994: 3 Against War (with Dennis Brown & Triston Palma)

== Live albums ==
- 1983: Aces International @ 82 Chisholm Avenue, Kingston
- 2004: Live in San Francisco

== Mixtapes and unofficial releases ==
- 2000: Trendsetter
- 2004: Cool Cool Rider - The Roots of a Dancehall Don
- 2006: Its Ah! Beenie (riddim mixtape)

== Singles ==
=== As lead artist ===
Title	Year	Peak chart positions									Certifications	Album
Title	Year	JAM Air.	CAN	FRA	NLD	NZ	UK	US	US R&B	US Rap	Certifications	Album
"Slam"	1995	*	—	—	—	—	—	—	75	33		Blessed
"Dancehall Queen" (featuring Chevelle Franklyn)	1997	2	—	45	10	—	70	90	64	—		Dancehall Queen soundtrack
"Who Am I (Sim Simma)"	1997	5	10	—	—	—	10	40	15	6	RIAA: Gold	Many Moods of Moses
"Foundation" (with The Taxi Gang)	1998	*	—	—	—	—	67	—	—	—		Many Moods of Moses
"Tell Me" (featuring Angie Martinez)	1998	*	—	—	—	—	—	— (Note: "Tell Me" did not enter the Billboard Hot 100, but peaked at number 19 on the Bubbling Under Hot 100 Singles chart.)	82	41		The Doctor
"Love Me Now" (featuring Wyclef Jean)	2000	*	—	—	—	—	—	—	90	42		Art and Life
"Girls Dem Sugar" (featuring Mýa)	2000	*	—	—	—	—	13	54	16	—		Art and Life
"Fresh from Yard" (featuring Lil' Kim)	2002	*	—	—	—	—	—	—	85	21		Tropical Storm
"Feel It Boy" (featuring Janet Jackson)	2002	*	15	47	33	12	9	28	31	14		Tropical Storm
"Bossman" (featuring Lady Saw and Sean Paul)	2003	*	—	—	—	—	78	—	— (Note: "Bossman" did not enter the Hot R&B/Hip-Hop Songs chart, but peaked at number one on the Bubbling Under R&B/Hip-Hop Singles chart.)	—		Tropical Storm
"Street Life"	2003	*	—	41	95	—	13	—	—	—		Tropical Storm
"Dude" (featuring Ms. Thing and Shawnna)	2004	*	—	—	77	—	7	26	16	12		Back to Basics
"King of the Dancehall"	2004	*	—	—	—	—	14	80	26	22		Back to Basics
"Hmm Hmm"	2006	*	—	—	—	—	—	— (Note: "Hmm Hmm" did not enter the Billboard Hot 100, but peaked at number 16 on the Bubbling Under Hot 100 Singles chart.)	31	19		Undisputed
"Girls" (featuring Akon)	2006	*	—	—	—	—	38	47	—	—		Undisputed
"Back It Up"	2007	*	—	—	—	—	—	—	—	—		Non-album singles
"Woman"	2009	*	—	—	—	—	—	—	—	—		Non-album singles
"I'm Drinking / Rum & Red Bull" (with Fambo)	2010	*	—	—	—	—	—	—	— (Note: "I'm Drinking / Rum & Red Bull" did not enter the Hot R&B/Hip-Hop Songs chart, but peaked at number 12 on the Bubbling Under R&B/Hip-Hop Singles chart.)	—		Non-album singles
"Wine Gal"	2012	*	—	—	—	—	—	—	—	—		Non-album singles
"Weh We Ago Do"	2017	*	—	—	—	—	—	—	—	—		Non-album singles
"Do You Want to Be That Guy"	2020	*	—	—	—	—	—	—	—	—		Non-album singles
"—" denotes a recording that did not chart or was not released in that territory. "*" denotes that the chart did not exist at that time.

=== As featured artist ===
Title	Year	Peak chart positions							Album
Title	Year	AUS	NLD	NZ	UK	US	US R&B	US Rap	Album
"Hands in the Air" (Doug E. Fresh featuring Beenie Man)	1995	—	—	—	—	—	— (Note: "Hands in the Air" did not enter the Hot R&B/Hip-Hop Songs chart, but peaked at number three on the Bubbling Under R&B/Hip-Hop Singles chart.)	—	Play
"Sound Clash" (Dream Warriors featuring Beenie Man)	1996	—	—	—	—	—	—	—	The Master Plan
"Mary's Got a Baby" (Maxi Priest featuring Beenie Man)	1999	—	—	19	—	—	—	—	Combination
"Outa Space (UFOs)" (Machel Montano featuring Beenie Man)	1999	—	—	19	—	—	—	—	Any Minute Now
"Money" (Jamelia featuring Beenie Man)	2000	—	51	—	5	—	—	—	Drama
"I'm Serious" (T.I. featuring Beenie Man)	2001	—	—	—	—	—	— (Note: "I'm Serious" did not enter the Hot R&B/Hip-Hop Songs chart, but peaked at number ten on the Bubbling Under R&B/Hip-Hop Singles chart.)	—	I'm Serious
"Jogi" (Panjabi MC featuring Beenie Man)	2003	92	—	—	—	—	—	—	Jogi
"Pride and Joy" (Ebon-E featuring Beenie Man)	2004	—	27	—	—	—	—	—	Non-album single
"Compton" (Guerilla Black featuring Beenie Man)	2004	—	—	—	—	— (Note: "Compton" did not enter the Billboard Hot 100, but peaked at number three on the Bubbling Under Hot 100 Singles chart.)	30	22	Guerilla City
"Soul on Fire" (KMC featuring Deevani and Beenie Man)	2005	—	—	—	—	—	—	—	Soul on Fire
"Flow Natural" (Tito El Bambino featuring Deevani and Beenie Man)	2006	—	—	—	—	—	—	—	Top of the Line
"Belly Danza" (Don Omar featuring Beenie Man)	2006	—	—	—	—	—	—	—	King of Kings
"Zingy" (Ak'Sent featuring Beenie Man)	2006	—	—	—	—	—	—	—	International
"Heaven Baby" (Brooke Hogan featuring Beenie Man)	2006	—	—	—	—	—	—	—	Undiscovered
"Better Than Dem" (Natasja featuring Beenie Man)	2008	—	—	—	—	—	—	—	Shooting Star
"Burnin' Burnin'" (Ms. Triniti featuring Beenie Man)	2008	—	—	—	—	—	—	—	Non-album singles
"Scorpion" (Nisha B. featuring Beenie Man)	2008	—	—	—	—	—	—	—	Non-album singles
"Get It On" (Rasun featuring Beenie Man)	2009	—	—	—	—	—	—	—	Non-album singles
"Giggle" (Busta Rhymes featuring Beenie Man)	2009	—	—	—	—	—	—	—	Non-album singles
"International" (Chali 2na featuring Beenie Man)	2009	—	—	—	—	—	—	—	Fish Outta Water
"Pleasure" (2G featuring Beenie Man and Chris S)	2009	—	—	—	—	—	—	—	Non-album single
"Gun Shot" (Nicki Minaj featuring Beenie Man)	2012	—	—	—	—	—	—	—	Pink Friday: Roman Reloaded
"Boom Boom DanZe" (Annie Khalid featuring Beenie Man)	2013	—	—	—	—	—	—	—	Non-album single
"Send It Up" (Kanye West featuring King Louie and Beenie Man)	2013	—	—	—	—	—	—	—	Yeezus
"Dancehall Soldier" (Yellow Claw featuring Beenie Man)	2014	—	—	—	—	—	—	—	Non-album singles
"Gimme That Love" (Zhavea featuring Beenie Man)	2015	—	—	—	—	—	—	—	Non-album singles
"Broken Heartbeat" (Teddybears featuring Beenie Man)	2015	—	—	—	—	—	—	—	Non-album singles
"Bitch Better Have My Money" (Rihanna featuring Beenie Man & Bounty Killer)	2015	—	—	—	—	—	—	—	Non-album singles
"Too Cool (Right Here)" (Sneakbo featuring Nyla and Beenie Man)	2016	—	—	—	—	—	—	—	Non-album singles
"Link Up" (ZJ Liquid featuring Kent Jones and Beenie Man)	2017	—	—	—	—	—	—	—	Non-album singles
"Dang Diggi Bang" (당디기 방) (RPR featuring Beenie Man)	2018	—	—	—	—	—	—	—	
"—" denotes a recording that did not chart or was not released in that territory.

== Guest appearances ==
Title	Year	Other artist(s)	Album
"Dirty Harry's Revenge"	2001	Adam F, Siamese	Kaos: The Anti-Acoustic Warfare
"International"	2009	Chali 2na	Fish Outta Water
"Gun Shot"	2012	Nicki Minaj	Pink Friday: Roman Reloaded
"Bitch Better Have My Money" (Don Corleon Dancehall Remix)	2015	Rihanna, Bounty Killer	Non-album song
"Freak of the Week" (Remix)	2015	Krept and Konan, Jeremih, Popcaan	"Freak of the Week" remix EP
"Henkel Glue"	2022	Shenseea	Alpha
