= Back to Basics (Beenie Man album) =

Studio album by Beenie Man
- Released: 13 July 2004
- Genre: Dancehall, reggae fusion
- Label: Virgin
- Producer: Dave Kelly, Tony "CD" Kelly, Troyton Rami, Cordel "Scatta" Burrell, Donovan Vendetta Bennett, Patrick Roberts, Supa Dups, Timbaland, Steven "Lenky" Marsden, Boi-1da, Chad Simpson

Beenie Man chronology
Tropical Storm (2002)	Back to Basics (2004)	Hundred Dollar Bag (2005)

Singles from Back to Basics
- 1. "Dude" Released: 18 November 2003; 2. "King of the Dancehall" Released: 24 August 2004

Back to Basics is the sixteenth studio album by the reggae artist Beenie Man released on 13 July 2004. His single "Dude" reached #26 on the Billboard charts and #7 on the British charts.

== Critical reception ==
Professional ratings
Aggregate scores
Source	Rating
Metacritic	69/100
Review scores
Source	Rating
AllMusic	4/5 stars
Blender	3/5 stars
The Guardian	2/5 stars
Rolling Stone	3/5 stars

Back to Basics received generally positive reviews from music critics. At Metacritic, which assigns a normalized rating out of 100 to reviews from mainstream critics, the album received an average score of 69, which indicates "generally favorable reviews", based on 13 reviews.

== Track listing ==
Standard edition
No.	Title	Writer(s)	Producer(s)	Length
1.	"Dude" (featuring Ms. Thing)	Dave Kelly	Dave Kelly	4:14
2.	"King of the Dancehall"	Moses Davis; Tony Kelly; Maurice Gregory	Tony "CD" Kelly	3:35
3.	"Love All Girls"	Davis; Troyton Rami	Troyton Rami	4:02
4.	"Dr. Know" (featuring Jimmy Cheeztrix)	D. Kelly	Dave Kelly	3:40
5.	"Grindacologist" (featuring Kymberli)	Davis; T. Kelly; Orville Burrell; Gregory	Tony "CD" Kelly	4:16
6.	"Get On Bad"	Davis; D. Kelly	Dave Kelly	3:44
7.	"Good Woe"	Davis; Cordel Burrell	Cordel "Scatta" Burrell; Everton Burrell	3:33
8.	"Doctor Mi Rate Yu" (featuring Ms. Thing)	Davis; Donovan Vendetta Bennett; Craig Marsh	Donovan Vendetta Bennett	3:33
9.	"Set Away"	Davis; Andrew Thomas	Patrick Roberts	3:42
10.	"Eloh"	Davis; Mario Campbell; Dwayne Chin-Quee	Dangazone Entertainment, Inc.; Danger Zone Entertainment; Supa Dups (co.)	3:27
11.	"All Girls Party"	Davis; Timothy Mosley	Timbaland	3:42
12.	"Pussy Language"	Davis; Campbell; Chin-Quee	Dangazone Entertainment, Inc.; Danger Zone Entertainment; Supa Dups (co.)	2:57
13.	"D-O or G-O" (featuring Ghost)	Davis; Steven Marsden	Steven "Lenky" Marsden	3:41
14.	"If a Neva God" (featuring Kirk Davis)	Davis; Sly Dunbar; Marsden	Patrick Roberts	5:04
15.	"Back Against the Wall"	Davis; Chad Simpson; Donovan Thompson	Chad "Mr. G" Simpson	3:50

European bonus tracks
No.	Title	Length
16.	"Row Like a Boat"	3:11
17.	"Pride & Joy" (featuring Ebon-E)	3:32

== Charts ==
=== Weekly charts ===
Chart (2004)	Peak position
US Billboard 200	51
US Top R&B/Hip-Hop Albums (Billboard)	7
US Reggae Albums (Billboard)	1

=== Year-end charts ===
Chart (2004)	Position
US Top R&B/Hip-Hop Albums (Billboard)	96
