= The Doctor (Beenie Man album) =

Studio album by Beenie Man
- Released: May 18, 1999
- Recorded: 1998–99
- Genre: Dancehall
- Length: 48:49
- Label: VP Records
- Producer: Patrick Roberts, Danny Browne, Tony "CD" Kelly, Kenny "Babyface" Edmonds, Richard Stephenson, Richard "Shams" Browne, Stack Money, Steely & Clevie

Beenie Man chronology
| Ruff 'N' Tuff (1999) | The Doctor (1999) | Y2K (1999) |

Professional ratings
Review scores
| Source | Rating |
|---|---|
| Allmusic | 3.0/5 stars |

The Doctor is the tenth studio album by Jamaican deejay Beenie Man, released in 1999 (see 1999 in music) by VP Records. The album features some of Beenie Man's most well known songs, such as "Bookshelf", "Tell Me (Remix)", and "Battery Dolly" among others. While not as commercially successful as his experimental previous album Many Moods of Moses, the album received high praises from fans and critics for a return to a more traditional dancehall sound. It is his eleventh studio album release.

== Album charts ==
| Chart (1999) | Position |
|---|---|
| U.S. Billboard Top Reggae Albums | 1 |
| U.S. Billboard Top R&B/Hip-Hop Albums | 55 |

== Track listing ==
1. "Gospel Time" – 4:15
2. "Let Him Go" – 3:27
3. "The Doctor" – 3:44
4. "Better Learn" – 3:28
5. "Pride & Joy" (featuring Jon B) – 3:46
6. "Bad Man Nuh Flee" (featuring Mr. Vegas) – 3:15
7. "Bookshelf" – 3:10
8. "One More Time" (featuring Little Kirk) – 3:46
9. "World Gone Mad" – 3:12
10. "Kingston Hot" – 2:57
11. "Tell Me (Re-mix)" (featuring Angie Martinez) – 3:29
12. "Battery Dolly" – 3:34
13. "Some Gal" – 3:00
14. "Protect Me" – 3:46
