= Dude (Beenie Man song) =

2003 single by Beenie Man

Single by Beenie Man featuring Ms. Thing

from the album Back to Basics
- B-side: "Fiesta" (version)
- Released: 18 November 2003
- Length: 4:15
- Label: Mad House; Virgin
- Songwriter: Dave Kelly
- Producer: Dave Kelly

Beenie Man singles chronology
"Bossman" (2003)	"Dude" (2003)	"Compton" (2004)

"Dude" is the first single released from Jamaican musician Beenie Man's 16th studio album, Back to Basics (2004). It features Ms. Thing and was produced and written by Dave Kelly. The song is enhanced by the use of a vocoder and is on the "Fiesta" riddim.

Kelly's Mad House label released "Dude" in Jamaica in 2003, and it was included on the Riddim Driven: Fiesta compilation album released the same year. Virgin Records then released a 12-inch single in the United States on 18 November 2003. "Dude" became a top-10 hit in the United Kingdom and a top-40 hit in Italy and the United States. The music video uses the remix of the song, which features American rapper Shawnna.

== Track listings ==
Jamaican 7-inch single

A. "Dude" (featuring Ms. Thing)
B. "Fiesta" (version)

US CD and 12-inch single

1. "Dude" (album version featuring Ms. Thing) – 4:13
2. "Dude" (remix featuring Ms. Thing and Shawnna) – 4:33
3. "Dude" (instrumental) – 4:11
4. "Dude" (a cappella featuring Ms. Thing) – 3:24

US remix 12-inch single

1. "Dude" (Beenie Man featuring Ms. Thing vs. N.E.R.D.) – 4:47
2. "Dude" (Sticky refix) – 4:04
3. "Dude" (Panjabi Hit Squad mix) – 4:08
4. "Dude" (Panjabi Hit Squad mix instrumental) – 4:09

Australian CD single

1. "Dude" (album version featuring Ms. Thing) – 4:13
2. "Dude" (remix featuring Ms. Thing and Shawnna) – 4:33
3. "Dude" (Sticky refix) – 4:03
4. "Dude" (Panjabi Hit Squad mix) – 4:07

UK CD1

1. "Dude" (radio edit featuring Ms. Thing) – 3:34
2. "Bossman" (video edit featuring Lady Saw and Sean Paul) – 3:00

UK CD2

1. "Dude" (album version) – 4:13
2. "Dude" (remix featuring Shawnna) – 4:33
3. "Dude" (Sticky refix) – 4:03
4. "Dude" (Panjabi Hit Squad mix) – 4:07
5. "Dude" (remix video featuring Shawnna) – 4:35

UK 12-inch single

A1. "Dude" (featuring Ms. Thing) – 4:13
A2. "Dude" (Panjabi Hit Squad mix) – 4:07
B1. "Girls Dem Sugar" – 4:21
B2. "Dude" (Sticky refix) – 4:03

== Charts ==
=== Weekly charts ===
Chart (2004)	Peak position
Australian Urban (ARIA)	37
Ireland (IRMA)	46
Italy (FIMI)	28
Netherlands (Dutch Top 40 Tipparade)	5
Netherlands (Single Top 100)	77
Scottish Singles Sales (Official Charts)	24
UK Singles (Official Charts)	7
US Billboard Hot 100	26
US Hot R&B/Hip-Hop Songs (Billboard)	16
US Hot Rap Songs (Billboard)	12
US Pop Airplay (Billboard)	34
US Rhythmic Airplay (Billboard)	34

=== Year-end charts ===
Chart (2004)	Position
UK Singles (OCC)	74
UK Urban (Music Week)	8
US Billboard Hot 100	85
US Hot R&B/Hip-Hop Singles & Tracks (Billboard)	50

== Certifications ==
Region	Certification	Certified units/sales
United Kingdom (BPI)	Silver	200,000^{‡}
^{‡} Sales+streaming figures based on certification alone.

== Release history ==
Region	Date	Format(s)	Label(s)	Ref.
Jamaica	2003	7-inch vinyl	Mad House	
United States	18 November 2003	12-inch vinyl	Virgin	
United Kingdom	1 March 2004	12-inch vinyl; CD	Virgin	
United States	1 June 2004	Contemporary hit radio	Virgin	
Australia	23 August 2004	CD	Virgin	
