= Ms. Thing (singer) =

Jamaican dancehall vocalist (born 1986)

- Born: Nateshia Lindsay; September 15, 1986 (age 39); Kingston, Jamaica
- Genres: Dancehall
- Occupation(s): Singer, deejay
- Instrument: Vocals
- Years active: 2002–2014
- Labels: Madhouse; Sequence

Nateshia Lindsay (born 15 September 1986), better known by her stage name Ms. Thing, is a Jamaican dancehall vocalist and deejay. She is best known for providing vocals on the international hit song "Dude" by Beenie Man, which charted in Italy, the Netherlands, the United Kingdom, and the United States.

== Music career ==
Discovered by Jamaican producer Dave Kelly as a teenager, Ms. Thing released her first single on his Madhouse Records label, "Get That Money", in December 2002.

She is best known for singing the chorus to the international hit song "Dude" by Beenie Man, written and produced by Kelly. In the United States, "Dude" peaked at number four on the Billboard's Hot R&B/Hip-Hop Songs charts in July 2004 and spent 48 weeks on that chart, and also peaked at number 26 on the Billboard Hot 100. In the United Kingdom, "Dude" peaked at number seven on the UK Singles Chart in March 2004, and spent 11 weeks on that chart.

The success of "Dude", and the remix and video featuring US rapper Shawnna, launched Ms. Thing into the international spotlight. She was signed to Sequence Records and in 2004 released her debut album, Miss Jamaica, featuring productions by Dave Kelly, Don Corleon, Tony Kelly, Leftside & Esco, and Switch. The album also features guest vocals from Beenie Man, Vybz Kartel, Sugar Daddy and Alanna Leslie.

In 2004, Ms. Thing's track "Love Guide" with Switch was included on the Wall of Sound album Two Culture Clash and she worked with David Guetta on his 2005 album Guetta Blaster. Her vocals have been remixed by UK garage producer Sticky, Portugal's Buraka Som Sistema, and British-Asian producers Panjabi Hit Squad.

Ms. Thing contributed vocals on the tracks "When You Hear The Bassline" and "Bruk Out" (with T.O.K.) from Major Lazer's 2009 debut album Guns Don't Kill People... Lazers Do. Also in 2009, she teamed up with Dre Skull's New York label Mixpak to voice "Bonify" alongside Psycho Tanbad.

== Personal life ==
Lindsay's son AJ was born in November 2004. She gave birth to another son in 2011, with Flexx from dancehall group T.O.K.

In September 2014, it was announced that Lindsay was baptised, and that she was engaged and retired from music.

== Discography ==
=== Albums ===
- Miss Jamaica – Sequence Records, 2004

=== Singles ===
- "Get That Money" – Mad House, 2002
- "Dude" (with Beenie Man) – Mad House, 2003
  - Re-released as featured artist – Virgin, 2004
- "Regular" – Mad House, 2003
- "I Want It All" – Sequence Records, 2004
- "Rich & Famous" – Don Corleon, 2004
- "Have U Man" (with Beenie Man) – Don Corleon, 2004
- "Hot" – Sequence Records, 2004
- "Any Way" – Shocking Vibes, 2004
- "Do Me" – Don Corleon, 2004
- "Pride A Side" – Young Blood, 2004
- "Pum Pum" – Fire Links, 2004
- "Jump Up & Rail" – Sequence Records, 2005
- "Tight" – Vendetta, 2005
- "On An' On" – Minor 7, Flat 5, 2005
- "Nah Run Dung" – Shocking Vibes, 2006
- "Bad Gal Bad Man" (with Monster Twins) – Birchill, 2007
- "She's Horny" (with Beenie Man) – Jah Snowcone, 2007
- "Dem Call We" – Ward 21, 2007
- "Fight Over Man" – Stainless, 2008
- "Nah Run Dung Nuh Husband" – Seanizzle, 2008
- "So We Stay" (with Beenie Man) – In Time Music, 2009
- "The Rock" – Supa Hype, 2010
- "Bonify" (with Psycho Tanbad) – Mixpak, 2010
- "Can't Do A Thing" (with Monster Twins) – Seanizzle, 2011
- "Dem a Nuh Body" – 2012

=== As featured artist ===
- "Love Guide" (with Switch) – Two Culture Clash, Wall Of Sound, 2004
- "Sweet Soca Music Remix" (with Sugar Daddy) – Sequence Records, 2004
- "Last Train" (with David Guetta) – Guetta Blaster, Virgin, 2005
- "When You Hear The Bassline" (with Major Lazer) – Guns Don't Kill People... Lazers Do, Mad Decent, 2009
- "Bruk Out" (with TOK & Major Lazer) – Guns Don't Kill People... Lazers Do, Mad Decent, 2009

=== Remixes ===
- "Dude" – Remix (with Beenie Man & Shawnna) – Def Jam, 2003
- "Dude" – Panjabi Hit Squad Remix (with Beenie Man) – Virgin, 2004
- "Dude" – Sticky Remix (with Beenie Man) – Virgin, 2004
- "Bruk Out" – Buraka Som Sistema Remix (with T.O.K. & Major Lazer) – FabricLIVE, 2009
