= Youth Quake =

Studio album by Beenie Man
- Released: October 2, 2001
- Genre: Reggae, ragga, dancehall
- Label: Artists Only

Beenie Man chronology
Art and Life (2000)	Youth Quake (2001)	The Magnificent (2002)

Professional ratings
Review scores
Source	Rating
Allmusic	2.5/5 stars

Youth Quake is the thirteenth studio album by Beenie Man.

The album debuted on Billboard magazine's Top Reggae Albums chart in the issue dated October 20, 2001, peaking at No. 10 during a five-week run on the chart.

== Track listing ==
1. "Selassie" – 3:39
2. "Bon Mi Fi Di Truth" – 3:36
3. "Cross Di Bridge" – 3:36
4. "Reggae Music" (featuring Mega Banton) – 3:49
5. "Badder Than Di Rest" - 3:28
6. "Bed A Roses" – 3:52
7. "Study Me"– 4:10
8. "Praise Him" – 3:47
9. "Leave Dem" – 3:46
10. "Tiger Ride Inna Town" – 3:49
11. "Cool Yu Toe" – 3:44
12. "Mek Use a Life" – 3:49
13. "Unu Fi Follow We" – 3:50

== Notes ==
- The album's notes state that Tracks 11 and 12 were recorded when Beenie Man was in his early teens.
- The track listing on the back of the album erroneously omits track 5, "Badder Than Di Rest", listing it as the next track, "Bed A Roses". It instead leaves a blank space for track 6.
- The vinyl pressing of the album omits the tracks, "Bed A Roses", "Praise Him" and "Cool Yu Toe".
- Track 3, "Cross Di Bridge" is listed under the different title of "Never Dis a Mobster", on the Beenie Man Gold compilation album.

== Charts ==
Chart performance for Youth Quake
Chart (2001)	Peak position
U.S. Top Reggae Albums (Billboard)	10
