= Cool Cool Rider =

Studio album by Beenie Man
- Released: December 4, 1992
- Studios: Penthouse Recording, Kingston
- Genres: Dancehall, reggae, ragga
- Label: VP
- Producers: Patrick Roberts and Anthony Kelly

Beenie Man chronology
The Invincible Beany Man - The 10 Year Old D.J. Wonder (1983)	Cool Cool Rider (1992)	Defend It (1994)

Professional ratings
Review scores
Source	Rating
Allmusic	3/5 stars

Cool Cool Rider is the second studio album for Beenie Man and his debut on VP Records.

== Track listing ==
- All songs written by Moses "Beenie Man" Davis, except where noted.
1. "Hey" (Anthony Kelly)
2. "Cu-Cum Looks" (Kelly)
3. "Tek Him Money"
4. "Full a Glamity"
5. "Shot Em Up"
6. "Mi Arrow"
7. "Cool Cool Rider"
8. "Yu Body Good"
9. "Tell Me Now"
10. "Which One" (M. Morgan)
11. "Ghetto Youths"
12. "A Nuh Strength"
