= Ms Scandalous =

Musical artist, a.k.a., Savita Vaid (born 1985)

- Born: Savita Vaid; 1985 (age 40–41); London, England
- Origin: London, England
- Genres: Bhangra
- Occupation: Singer
- Instrument: Vocals
- Years active: 2002–present
- Labels: Desi Jam, Major Moves

Savita Vaid (born 1985), better known by her stage name Ms Scandalous, is an English bhangra/rap artist.

Vaid was born in Southall, West London, into an Indian Punjabi Hindu family. She was signed by Panjabi Hit Squad after she was seen working part-time at a music store in Southall. Her first recorded appearance was on Panjabi Hit Squad's 2002 album, The Streets, MCing for the second-to-last track, the garage remix of "Hai Hai".

Her first full-length album, Ladies First, was released in May 2005 while she was in her final year at university. She juggled producing and promoting the album with studying for her degree in arts management. The video for the second track, "Aaja Soniyah", entered the MTV Base top ten at number four. The album itself topped Asian music charts everywhere and launched Ms Scandalous as the first Asian female rapper.

A second album, Aag, was released in late 2008 after a three-year break from the music industry. The album features the hit single "Aag". Panjabi Hit Squad and Alyssia produced the album and provided vocals.

== Discography ==
- The Streets (with Panjabi Hit Squad; 2002/Tiger Entertainment)
- Ladies First (2005/Desi Jam Recordings)
- Aag (October 2008/Major Moves)
