= Tropical Storm (album) =

Studio album by Beenie Man
- Released: August 20, 2002
- Genres: Dancehall; reggae fusion
- Length: 50:57
- Label: Virgin
- Producers: AC Burrell; DJ Clue; Irv Gotti; Ken "Duro" Ifill; Dave Kelly; Tony Kelly; The Neptunes; Wayne "Devonte" Passely; Chink Santana; Stargate; Sly Dunbar

Beenie Man chronology
The Magnificent (2002)	Tropical Storm (2002)	Back to Basics (2004)

Singles from Tropical Storm
- 1. "Feel It Boy" Released: June 25, 2002; 2. "Bossman" Released: 2003

Tropical Storm is reggae and dancehall artist Beenie Man's fifteenth studio album. It was released by Virgin Records on August 20, 2002 in the United States. The album is a mix of dancehall and reggae fusion, with hit singles such as "Feel It Boy" featuring R&B singer Janet Jackson and "Bossman" featuring dancehall artists Lady Saw and Sean Paul.

== Critical reception ==
Professional ratings
Aggregate scores
Source	Rating
Metacritic	63/100
Review scores
Source	Rating
AllMusic	3/5 stars
The Guardian	4/5 stars
New York Post	4/4 stars
Rolling Stone	2/5 stars

Tropical Storm received mixed to positive reviews from music critics. At Metacritic, which assigns a normalized rating out of 100 to reviews from mainstream critics, the album received an average score of 63, which indicates "generally favorable reviews", based on 10 reviews. New York Post critic Dan Aquilante praised Tropical Storm, calling Beenie Man a "dance-hall reggae master" who "hits a home run." He singled out "Party Hard" as "easily the album's best track," with "Fresh From the Yard" a "very close second." Caroline Sullivan of The Guardian praised the album for its energetic, accessible dancehall sound and Beenie Man's charismatic delivery. She highlighted the album's high-profile collaborations with Janet Jackson, Lil' Kim and So Solid Crew, while emphasizing that its appeal ultimately rested on Beenie Man's expansive personality and engaging songwriting. Rolling Stone gave Tropical Storm two out of five stars, criticizing its overt crossover ambitions and formulaic subject matter. It nevertheless praised the Neptunes' blend of pop and traditional dancehall, particularly on "You Babe."

== Commercial performance ==
Tropical Storm was Beenie Man's highest-charting album at the time and remains his highest-charting album to date. It peaked at number 18 on the US Billboard 200 and number seven on the Top R&B/Hip-Hop Albums chart. It topped the US Reggae Albums chart and also reached the top 100 in the United Kingdom, Germany, and France.

== Track listing ==
Tropical Storm track listing
No.	Title	Writer(s)	Producer(s)	Length
1.	"Party Hard"	Moses Davis; Winston Burger; Dave Kelly; Dameon Beckett	D. Kelly	4:00
2.	"Feel It Boy" (featuring Janet Jackson)	Davis; Pharrell Williams; Chad Hugo	The Neptunes	3:27
3.	"Bad Girl" (featuring Justin Vince)	Davis; Williams; Hugo	The Neptunes	3:53
4.	"Real Gangsta"	Davis; Clyde McKenzie; Chink Santana; Irv Gotti	Santana; Gotti	3:28
5.	"Fresh from Yard" (featuring Lil' Kim)	Davis; Ernesto Shaw; Ken "Duro" Ifill; Kimberly Jones	DJ Clue; Ifill	4:33
6.	"Miss L.A.P."	Davis; Tony "CD" Kelly	T. Kelly	4:04
7.	"Street Life"	Davis; Tor Erik Hermansen; Mikkel S. Eriksen	Stargate	3:27
8.	"Gangsta Life"	Davis; D. Kelly	D. Kelly	4:35
9.	"Pure Pretty Gal"	Davis; Norman Howell; T. Kelly	T. Kelly	4:17
10.	"Bossman" (featuring Lady Saw and Sean Paul)	Davis; Williams; Hugo; Marion Hall; Sean Henriques	The Neptunes	4:05
11.	"Yagga Yo" (featuring So Solid Crew)	Davis; AC Burrell; Megaman	Burrell	3:53
12.	"More We Want" (featuring Tanto Metro and Devonte)	Davis; Donald Dennis; Mark Wolfe; Melbourne George Miller; Patrick Roberts; Paul Crossdale; Paul Green; Paula Wright; Wayne "Devonte" Passley	Passley	3:36
13.	"You Babe"	Davis; Carl Udah; Lowell Dunbar; Robert Shakespeare; Steven "Lenky" Marsden	Sly & Robbie	3:39
Total length:				50:57

Sample credits

- "Fresh From Yard" contains portions of the compositions "Flex" and "Roots & Culture."

== Charts ==
=== Weekly charts ===
Weekly chart performance for Tropical Storm
Chart (2002)	Peak position
French Albums (SNEP)	130
German Albums (Offizielle Top 100)	95
UK Albums (Official Charts)	100
US Billboard 200	18
US Top R&B/Hip-Hop Albums (Billboard)	7
US Reggae Albums (Billboard)	1

=== Year-end charts ===
Year-end chart performance for Tropical Storm
Chart (2002)	Position
Canadian R&B Albums (Nielsen SoundScan)	95
