= Ladies First (Ms Scandalous album) =

Studio album by Ms Scandalous
- Released: May 2005
- Recorded: Kreative Kontrol, London; Frantic Studio, Birmingham; Hi Street Studio, London
- Genre: Rap/Desi
- Length: 31:38
- Label: Desi Jam Studios
- Producer: Panjabi Hit Squad

Ladies First is the debut album of Desi/British Asian rapper Ms Scandalous, recorded almost three years after her first appearance with Panjabi Hit Squad with the track "Hai Hai" on their 2002 album The Streets. PHS produced and co-wrote the album. In addition to Ms Scandalous' MCing, the album featured the sung vocals of Jaspinder Narula and Alyssia.

The video for "Aaja Soniyah" by Simon Poon-Tip entered the Top Ten of MTV Base, a first for an Asian female artist.
