= Y2K (Beenie Man album) =

Studio album by Beenie Man
- Released: September 14, 1999
- Genre: Reggae, ragga, dancehall
- Label: Artists Only

Beenie Man chronology
The Doctor (1997)	Y2K (1999)	Art and Life (2000)

Professional ratings
Review scores
Source	Rating
Allmusic	3/5 stars

Y2K is the eleventh studio album by Beenie Man.

== Track listing ==
1. "Woman Ah Modler" – 3:35
2. "Boogie Down" – 3:48
3. "Miss Angela" (featuring Christina) – 3:53
4. "Feel Good" (featuring Leroy Sibbles) – 3:50
5. "Recruiting Girl" – 3:35
6. "Illiterate Gal"– 3:35
7. "Matey" – 3:27
8. "Veteran" – 3:34
9. "AIDS Veteran (Remix)" – 3:29
10. "Fuck Hawk" – 3:42
11. "Greendelero (Remix)” – 3:37
12. "Green Card Buddy" - 3:37

== Notes ==
- The vinyl pressing of the album omits the tracks "Feel Good" and "Green Card Buddy".
- Track 9, "AIDS Veteran (Remix)" is a remix of the song, "AIDS Victim", but is erroneously listed as "AIDS Veteran".

== Charts ==
Chart (1999)	Peak position
U.S. Billboard Top Reggae Albums	11
