= Feel It Boy =

2002 single by Beenie Man

Single by Beenie Man featuring Janet Jackson

from the album Tropical Storm
- B-side: "Bossman"
- Released: 15 July 2002
- Length: 3:27
- Label: Virgin
- Songwriters: Moses Davis; Pharrell Williams; Chad Hugo
- Producer: The Neptunes

Beenie Man singles chronology
"Fresh from Yard" (2002)	"Feel It Boy" (2002)	"Bossman" (2003)

Janet Jackson singles chronology
"Son of a Gun (I Betcha Think This Song Is About You)" (2001)	"Feel It Boy" (2002)	"Just a Little While" (2004)

Audio video
- "Feel It Boy" on YouTube

"Feel It Boy" is a song by Jamaican dancehall deejay Beenie Man featuring American singer Janet Jackson from Beenie Man's 15th studio album, Tropical Storm (2002). The song was written by Beenie Man, Pharrell Williams, and Chad Hugo and was produced by the Neptunes. Virgin Records released the song on 15 July 2002 as the lead single from the album. "Feel It Boy" peaked at number nine on the UK Singles Chart and became a top-40 hit in eight other countries, including the United States, where it peaked at number 28.

== Song information ==
The song was written by Beenie Man and produced by award-winning duo the Neptunes. It was released as a single on 15 July 2002 peaking inside the top 20 and 30 of several countries. It spent 12 weeks on the Billboard Hot 100 peaking at number 28. It also peaked at number nine on the UK Singles Chart, becoming Janet Jackson's 17th top ten single and last one to date. Jackson set the record for having the most top ten singles for a solo artist without reaching number one. The song appeared in the Japan-only radio promo sampler We Love Janet in 2006. It was also used as a DJ interlude on Jacksons 2015–2016 Unbreakable World Tour and her 2017 State of the World Tour.

In 2004, Jackson expressed her regret for the duet, saying "If I had known that (he was associated with homophobia), I would not have worked with him. It's shocking to me. We're on the same label, so I should have known. But at the same time, I wish someone from the company would have told me, knowing how... I feel about the gay community."

== Music video ==
The music video was directed by Dave Meyers. Set on an island beach, it depicts different characters in their daily life with Jackson and Beenie Man on the beach enjoying the surroundings and different activities around them. Towards the end, Beenie Man pulls in a four-wheeler near Jackson and begins to eye him with binoculars. The video ends with a party that was mentioned in the song. The video was filmed on Westward Beach in Malibu, California.

== Track listings ==
US CD single

1. "Feel It Boy" (album version) – 3:26
2. "Feel It Boy" (Just Blaze Remix extended) – 5:24
3. "Feel It Boy" (Joint Custody Remix extended) – 5:56
4. "Feel It Boy" (Deep Dish Dancehall Remix) – 12:13

UK CD single

1. "Feel It Boy" – 3:26
2. "Feel It Boy" (Just Blaze Remix edit) – 3:31
3. "Feel It Boy" (Nikki Holliwood radio edit) – 3:51
4. "Feel It Boy" (Deep Dish radio edit) – 3:47

UK 12-inch single

A1. "Feel It Boy" (Nikki Holliwood radio edit) – 3:51
A2. "Feel It Boy" (Just Blaze Remix radio edit) – 3:31
B1. "Feel It Boy" (Deep Dish Dancehall Remix) – 12:13

UK cassette single

1. "Feel It Boy" (radio edit) – 3:22
2. "Feel It Boy" (Just Blaze Remix radio edit) – 3:31

European CD single

1. "Feel It Boy" (radio edit) – 3:22
2. "Bossman" (edited version featuring Lady Saw and Sean Paul) – 4:05

Australian CD single

1. "Feel It Boy" (radio edit) – 3:22
2. "Bossman" (featuring Lady Saw and Sean Paul) – 4:05
3. "Feel It Boy" (instrumental) – 3:35
4. "Bossman" (instrumental) – 3:59

== Charts ==
=== Weekly charts ===
Weekly chart performance for "Feel It Boy"
Chart (2002)	Peak position
Australia (ARIA)	18
Australian Urban (ARIA)	4
Belgium (Ultratop 50 Flanders)	44
Belgium (Ultratip Bubbling Under Wallonia)	4
Canada (Nielsen SoundScan)	15
Denmark (Tracklisten)	11
Europe (Eurochart Hot 100)	32
France (SNEP)	47
Germany (GfK)	72
Italy (FIMI)	24
Netherlands (Dutch Top 40 Tipparade)	2
Netherlands (Single Top 100)	33
New Zealand (Recorded Music NZ)	12
Scotland Singles (Official Charts)	39
Switzerland (Schweizer Hitparade)	40
UK Singles (Official Charts)	9
UK Hip Hop/R&B (Official Charts)	2
US Billboard Hot 100	28
US Hot R&B/Hip-Hop Songs (Billboard)	31
US Hot Rap Songs (Billboard)	14
US Pop Airplay (Billboard)	25
US Rhythmic Airplay (Billboard)	13

=== Year-end charts ===
Year-end chart performance for "Feel It Boy"
Chart (2002)	Position
Canada (Nielsen SoundScan)	121
UK Singles (OCC)	200
US Rhythmic Top 40 (Billboard)	85

== Certifications ==
Certifications and sales for "Feel It Boy"
Region	Certification	Certified units/sales
Australia (ARIA)	Gold	35,000^{^}
New Zealand (RMNZ)	Gold	15,000^{‡}
^{^} Shipments figures based on certification alone.^{‡} Sales+streaming figures based on certification alone.

== Release history ==
Release dates and formats for "Feel It Boy"
Region	Date	Format(s)	Label(s)	Ref.
United States	15 July 2002	Contemporary hit; rhythmic contemporary; urban radio	Virgin	
Australia	9 September 2002	CD	Virgin	
United Kingdom	16 September 2002	12-inch vinyl; CD; cassette	Virgin	
Canada	1 October 2002	CD	Virgin	
