= The Invincible Beany Man - The 10 Year Old D.J. Wonder =

Studio album by Beany Man
- Released: 1983
- Genre: Reggae
- Label: Bunny Lee

Beany Man chronology
The Invincible Beany Man - The 10 Year Old D.J. Wonder (1983)	Cool Cool Rider (1992)

The Invincible Beany Man - The 10 Year Old D.J. Wonder is the debut studio album by Jamaican musician Beany Man (which would later be changed to Beenie Man), released in 1983 at the age of 10. The album was entirely produced by Bunny Lee.

Beenie Man had recorded his first single in 1981, and had recorded with producers such as Henry "Junjo" Lawes. He had been a popular performer on sound systems such as Jammy's, Volcano, (Bunny) Lee's Unlimited, and his uncle's Master Blaster system since 1978. Released on Lee's label, the album was not a major success but has since been viewed positively; Dave Thompson, in his book Reggae & Caribbean Music, says of the album "Obviously a child's view is somewhat limited, but the attitude and confidence were already in place".

== Track listing ==
1. "Woman a Labba"
2. "Bony Punanny"
3. "Bright and Bare Face"
4. "Sound Boy Kuffing"
5. "Sleep with a Gal"
6. "Con Don"
7. "Girls Nowaday"
8. "Try Some Hustlin"
9. "Insects Nuh Bother We"
10. "Granny Cooking"
