= The Magnificent (Beenie Man album) =

Studio album by Beenie Man
- Released: March 26, 2002
- Genre: Reggae, dancehall
- Label: 2B1 Multimedia

Beenie Man chronology
Youth Quake (2001)	The Magnificent (2002)	Tropical Storm (2002)

Professional ratings
Review scores
Source	Rating
Allmusic	4/5 stars

The Magnificent is the fourteenth studio album by Beenie Man.

== Track listing ==
1. "No More Talk" – 3:45
2. "Murder" – 3:25
3. "Tom Bully" – 3:34
4. "Body Good Like Gold" – 3:24
5. "Warn Them" – 3:32
6. "Pretty Matey"– 3:49
7. "Follow Mi Lyrics" – 3:43
8. "Sing My Song" – 3:52
9. "Borro'lero" – 3:50
10. "The More I Love" – 3:41
11. "Mocking Bird Song" – 3:36
12. "You a Fool" – 3:31
13. "A New Gear" – 3:46
14. "The Greatest" – 3:40
15. "The Magnificent Beenie Man" – 3:28
16. "Do the Beenie Shuffle" – 3:38
17. "Hop on Board" – 3:29
