= Maestro (Beenie Man album) =

Studio album by Beenie Man
- Released: December 10, 1996
- Genre: Reggae, ragga, dancehall
- Label: VP, Greensleves

Beenie Man chronology
Beenie Man Meets Mad Cobra (1995)	Maestro (1996)	Many Moods of Moses (1997)

Professional ratings
Review scores
Source	Rating
Allmusic	4.5/5 stars
Muzik	5/5 stars

Maestro is the seventh studio album by Beenie Man.

== Track listing ==
1. "Maestro" – 3:36
2. "Nuff Gal" – 4:26
3. "Blackboard" – 3:49
4. "Girls Dem Sugar" – 3:48
5. "Any Mr. Man" – 4:01
6. "Long Longi Lala" (featuring Lady Saw)– 3:37
7. "Be My Lady" – 4:01
8. "Halla Fi Di Jordan" – 3:31
9. "Yaw Yaw" – 3:32
10. "Girls Way" – 3:51
11. "Oh Jah Jah" (featuring Silvercat) – 3:48
12. "His-Story" – 3:36
13. "Man Royal" – 3:37
14. "One Big Road" – 4:02
15. "Nuh Lock" – 4:07
16. "Africans" – 4:04
17. "Jerusalem" – 3:34
18. "In the Ghetto" – 3:50
19. "Romie" – 3:47

== Charts ==
Chart (1996)	Peak position
U.S. Billboard Top Reggae Albums	3
