= Ruff 'N' Tuff =

Studio album by Beenie Man
- Released: April 6, 1999
- Genre: Reggae, ragga, dancehall
- Label: Fuel 2000

Beenie Man chronology
Many Moods of Moses (1997)	Ruff 'N' Tuff (1999)	The Doctor (1999)

Professional ratings
Review scores
Source	Rating
Allmusic	3.5/5 stars

Ruff 'N' Tuff is the ninth studio album by Beenie Man.

== Track listing ==
1. "Matie" – 3:49
2. "Black Liberty" – 3:35
3. "Gi Man Bun" – 3:48
4. "Mouth Murderer" – 3:40
5. "Good Times" – 4:10
6. "Rough & Tough, Beenie Man"– 3:47
7. "Young Man Got the John" – 3:51
8. "Push Up Your Hands" – 3:34
9. "Three Against War" – 4:07
10. "Bicycle Man" – 3:30
11. "Mankind" – 3:43
12. "Miss Brown & Pretty" – 3:33
13. "Promises" – 3:27
14. "Miss Angela" – 4:13
15. "She's Running from Her Life" – 3:36
16. "Do the Butterfly" – 3:21

== Charts ==
Chart (1999)	Peak position
U.S. Billboard Top Reggae Albums	5
