= King of the Dancehall =

King of the Dancehall can refer to:

- King of the Dancehall (film), a 2016 American film
- King of the Dancehall (song), a 2004 song by Beenie Man
