= Beenie Man Meets Mad Cobra =

Studio album by Beenie Man
- Released: September 5, 1995
- Genre: Reggae, ragga, dancehall
- Label: VP

Beenie Man chronology
Blessed (1995)	Beenie Man Meets Mad Cobra (1995)	Maestro (1996)

Professional ratings
Review scores
Source	Rating
Allmusic	4/5 stars

Beenie Man Meets Mad Cobra is the sixth studio album by Beenie Man. Every track on the album features Jamaican reggae artist Mad Cobra.

== Track listing ==
1. "Defend Apache" (featuring Mad Cobra) – 3:38
2. "Once a Year" (featuring Mad Cobra) – 4:04
3. "Dis de Man" (featuring Mad Cobra) – 3:55
4. "Bury Yu Dead" (featuring Mad Cobra)– 3:47
5. "Tek Weh Yu Girl" (featuring Mad Cobra) – 3:46
6. "Name Yu Call" (featuring Mad Cobra) – 3:54
7. "More Dem Talk" (featuring Mad Cobra) – 3:42
8. "Dem Haffi Move" (featuring Mad Cobra) – 3:41
9. "Wife Already" (featuring Mad Cobra) – 3:49
10. "Gun Pop Off" (featuring Mad Cobra) – 3:41
11. "Gun Finger" (featuring Mad Cobra) – 3:41
12. "Look Yu Man" (featuring Mad Cobra) – 3:52
