= Bossman (song) =

Single by Beenie Man featuring Sean Paul and Lady Saw

from the album Tropical Storm
- Released: 2003
- Recorded: 2002
- Genre: Dancehall, reggae
- Length: 4:05
- Label: Virgin
- Songwriters: Sean Paul Henriques, Anthony Moses Davis, Pharrell Williams, Charles Edward Hugo
- Producer: The Neptunes

Beenie Man singles chronology
"Street Life" (2003)	"Bossman" (2003)	"Dude" (2004)

"Bossman" is a song by Beenie Man released in 2003 as the second single from his sixteenth studio album Tropical Storm. The song was written by Sean Paul, Beenie Man and The Neptunes (who also produces the track), and features fellow dancehall artists Sean Paul and Lady Saw. It failed to chart on any of the Billboard charts, but it did manage to peak at #78 on the UK Singles Chart.

== Music video ==
The official music video for the song was directed by Jeremy Rall.

== Track listings ==
12" Vinyl

1. "Bossman" (album version) – 4:05
2. "Bossman" (instrumental) – 3:59

CD single - US

1. "Bossman" (video edit clean) - 3:00
2. "Bossman" (instrumental) - 3:59
3. "Bad Girl" - 3:53

CD single - Europe

1. "Bossman" (video edit clean) – 3:00
2. "Bossman" (album version) – 4:05
3. "Bossman" (instrumental) – 3:59

== Charts ==
Chart (2003)	Peak position
UK Singles Chart	78
