= Who Am I (Sim Simma) =

Single by Beenie Man

from the album Many Moods of Moses
- Released: 1997
- Genre: Reggae, dancehall
- Length: 3:16
- Label: VP; Slammin' Vinyl
- Songwriter: Anthony Davis,
- Producer: Jeremy Harding

Beenie Man singles chronology
"Dancehall Queen" (1997)	"Who Am I (Sim Simma)" (1997)	"Tell Me" (1998)

"Who Am I (Sim Simma)", or simply "Who Am I", is a reggae single released by dancehall artist Beenie Man in 1998. It is the second track on his album Many Moods of Moses released in 1997.

The song is based on the "Playground" riddim (instrumental accompaniment), which was produced by Jeremy Harding. According to Harding, "Beenie Man had heard the riddim 'Playground' on several occasions and loved it. He had even written a tune already when he arrived at the studio to voice without any prior notice. I heard a knocking one morning...and couldn't believe when I saw Beenie Man sitting outside complaining about how long he had been banging down the door. I turned on the equipment, and he went straight into the booth to record a perfect version of "Who Am I" in what seemed like one take."

The track helped to introduce Beenie Man to the world as a new reggae star in the pages of Newsweek and other major media outlets. He used a portion of this song in his reggae fusion single "Girls Dem Sugar" featuring Mýa which was released in 2000.

== Chart success ==
The song reached No. 10 in the UK Singles Chart and was his first top 40 hit in the UK. On the US Billboard charts, the song reached No. 6 on their Hot Rap Singles chart. On the Hot R&B singles chart, the song reached No. 15.

== Charts ==
=== Weekly charts ===
Chart (1997–1998)	Peak position
UK Singles (OCC)	10
US Billboard Hot 100	40
US Hot R&B/Hip-Hop Songs (Billboard)	15
US Hot Rap Songs (Billboard)	6

Chart (2026)	Peak position
Jamaica Airplay (JAMMS)	5

=== Year-end charts ===
Chart (1998)	Position
US Hot R&B/Hip-Hop Songs (Billboard)	55

== Certifications ==
Region	Certification	Certified units/sales
United States (RIAA)	Gold	500,000^{‡}
^{‡} Sales+streaming figures based on certification alone.

== Pop culture references ==
- American rapper Logic's 2018 song "The Return" alludes to the song with "Like, la-di-da-di, who got the keys to my Audi?", This is also a reference to Doug E. Fresh & the Get Fresh Crew's 1985 hit “La Di Da Di.”.
- Brockhampton's 2021 song "Sex" references the "sim simma" lyric.
