= Blessed (Beenie Man album) =

Studio album by Beenie Man
- Released: July 17, 1995
- Genres: Reggae, ragga, dancehall
- Length: 52:20
- Label: Island Jamaica

Beenie Man chronology
| Guns Out (1994) | Blessed (1995) | Beenie Man Meets Mad Cobra (1995) |

Professional ratings
Review scores
| Source | Rating |
|---|---|
| AllMusic | link |

Blessed is the fifth studio album by Jamaican musician Beenie Man, released in 1995. It is his first album to receive an international release. Blessed gained Beenie Man a large following outside of Jamaica for the first time, setting the stage for his multiple collaborations with some of the biggest American hip hop and R&B stars of the late 1990s and early 2000s.

== Track listing ==
1. "Blessed" (Davis/Henton/Jackson/Morgan) – 3:39
2. "Slam" (Kelly) – 2:45
3. "Freedom" (Davis/Dennis/Dunbar/Roberts) – 4:00
4. "Stop Live in a de Pass" (Davis/Dunbar) – 3:51
5. "Acid Attack" (Davis/Dennis/Roberts/Thomas/Williams) – 3:55
6. "Modelling" (Davis/Fluxy/Mafia) – 3:47
7. "Matie a Come" (Crossdale/Davis/Dennis/Kelly/Miller) – 3:49
8. "Man Moving" (Davis/Dennis/Dunbar/Roberts) – 3:45
9. "World Dance" (Davis/Henton/Jackson) – 3:43
10. "Tear off Mi Garment" (Aquaman/Davis/Dennis/Jackson/Roberts/Thomas) – 3:58
11. "New Name" (with Lukie D.) – 3:44
12. "Weeping & Mourning" (Crossdale/Davis/Dennis/Miller/Roberts) – 3:52
13. "Heaven Vs. Hell" (Davis/Dennis/Dunbar/Morgan) – 3:46
14. "See a Man Face" (Crossdale/Davis/Dennis/Jackson/Miller/Roberts) – 3:46

== Personnel ==
- Beenie "Moses Davis" Man - Arranger, Producer, Vocals
- Computer Paul - Bass, Keyboards, Programming
- Donald Dennis - Bass, Keyboards
- Lynford "Fatta" Marshall - Arranger, Producer
- Fluxy - Programming
- Leroy Mafia - Bass, Keyboards
- Gary Jackson - Engineer
- Patrick Roberts - Producer
- Andrew Thomas - Programming
- Collin "Bulbie" York - Arranger, Producer
- Paul "Wrong Move" Crossdale - Keyboards
- Madhouse Crew - Arranger
- Dean Mundy - Engineer
- The Shocking Vibes Crew - Arranger, Producer
- Lukie D - Performer
- Dave Kelly - Bass, Keyboards, Programming, Producer, Engineer

== Charts ==
Blessed peaked at No. 15 on the Billboard Reggae Albums chart.

=== Singles ===
| Year | Song | Chart | Peak |
|---|---|---|---|
| 1995 | "Slam" | Billboard Hot Rap Singles | 33 |
| 1995 | "Slam" | Billboard Hot Dance Music/Maxi-Singles Sales | 35 |
| 1995 | "Slam" | Billboard Hot R&B Singles | 75 |
