= Many Moods of Moses =

Studio album by Beenie Man
- Released: December 9, 1997
- Recorded: 1995–1997
- Studio: Penthouse Recording Studios; Sonic Sounds; Hard Sound Recording Studios; Anchor Studios (Kingston, Jamaica); Wildwood Recording Studios (Nashville, Tennessee)
- Genre: Dancehall; reggae; ragga; folk
- Length: 1:04:29
- Label: VP
- Producer: Andrew Thomas; Beenie Man; Bob Patin; Buju Banton; David Cole; Gitsy; Handel Tucker; Jeremy Harding; Lenky; Sly and Robbie; Tony "CD" Kelly

Beenie Man chronology
Maestro (1996)	Many Moods of Moses (1997)	Ruff 'N' Tuff (1999)

Singles from Many Moods of Moses
- 1. "Who Am I (Sim Simma)" Released: 1998; 2. "Oysters & Conch" Released: 1998; 3. "Foundation" Released: 1998

Many Moods of Moses is the eighth studio album by Jamaican dancehall musician Beenie Man. It was released on December 9, 1997 through VP Records. Recording sessions took place at Penthouse Recording Studios, Sonic Sounds, Hard Sound Recording Studios, and Anchor Studios in Kingston and at Wildwood Recording Studios in Nashville. Production was handled by Lenky, Sly and Robbie, Andrew Thomas, Handel Tucker, Bob Patin, Buju Banton, David Cole, Jeremy Harding, Tony "CD" Kelly, Lloyd "Gitsy" Willis and Beenie Man himself, with Patrick Roberts serving as executive producer. It features guest appearances from A.R.P., Bob Patin, Buju Banton, Danny Marshall, Lady Saw, Little Kirk and The Taxi Gang.

The album peaked at number 151 on the Billboard 200, number 35 on the Top R&B Albums, atop Reggae Albums, and number 5 on the Heatseekers Albums in the United States. In the United Kingdom, it made it only to number 21 on the Official Independent Albums Chart. Many Moods of Moses spawned three singles: "Who Am I", "Oysters & Conch" and "Foundation". Its lead single, "Who Am I", reached number 40 on the US Billboard Hot 100 and number 10 on the UK Singles Chart. The second single off of the album peaked at number 69 on the UK Singles Chart.

In 1999, the album was nominated for a Grammy Award for Best Reggae Album at the 41st Annual Grammy Awards.

== Critical reception ==
Professional ratings
Review scores
Source	Rating
AllMusic	4.5/5 stars
RapReviews	8/10
Robert Christgau	(neither)

Roni Sarig of City Pages noted that the album "dabbles in various styles", continued "he touches on Zulu chant-sing in "Introlude"; rudimentary drum 'n' bass in "Monster Look"; new-jack swing in his version of Bobby Brown's "My Prerogative"; and Nashville fiddle and pedal steel with "Ain't Gonna Figure It Yet". And with the worldwide hit "Who Am I", where Beenie flaunts hip-hop swagger over Jeremy Harding's sophisticated production". Robert Christgau gave the album a "neither" rating, meaning it "may impress once or twice with consistent craft or an arresting track or two. Then it won't".

In retrospective reviews, AllMusic's Jo-Ann Greene praised the album, saying "Beenie Man along with executive producer Patrick Roberts no longer felt the need to overwhelm audiences with a smorgasbord of sound, and thus Many Moods of Moses is a more coherent set than its predecessor". Steve Juon of RapReviews found "there's not a whole lot of overlap on this particular Beenie Man album other than 'Who Am I?'", giving the album 8 out of 10.

== Track listing ==
No.	Title	Writer(s)	Length
1.	"Introlude/Foundation" (featuring the Taxi Gang)	Moses Davis; Lowell Dunbar; Robbie Shakespeare; Lloyd "Gitsy" Willis; Ernie Freeman; Ansel Collins; Dean Fraser	5:24
2.	"Who Am I (Sim Simma)"	Davis; Jeremy Harding	3:16
3.	"Monster Look"	Davis; Steven Marsden; Dunbar	3:58
4.	"Ain't Gonna Figure It Yet" (featuring Bob Patin)	Davis; Bob Patin; Hoot Hester; Kerry Marx; Milton Sledge; Tommy White	3:19
5.	"Woman a Sample" (featuring Buju Banton)	Davis; Mark Myrie; Marsden; David Cole	3:56
6.	"Heaven on Earth" (featuring A.R.P.)	Davis; Marsden; Dunbar	4:53
7.	"Oysters & Conch"	Davis; Marsden; Anthony Kelly	3:17
8.	"So Hot" (featuring Lady Saw)	Davis; Marsden; Dunbar	3:37
9.	"Have You Ever" (featuring Little Kirk)	Davis; Marsden; Dunbar; Dean Mundy	4:00
10.	"Got to Be There" (featuring Danny Marshall)	Davis; Danny Marshall	4:27
11.	"Bad Man"	Davis; Marsden; Andrew Thomas	3:46
12.	"Steve Biko"	Davis; Marsden; Dunbar	4:12
13.	"Long Road"	Davis; Handel Tucker	4:03
14.	"Sincerely"	Davis; Tucker	4:14
15.	"Miss You" (featuring A.R.P.)		4:18
16.	"Bad Mind Is Active (My Prerogative)"		3:49
Total length:			1:04:29

== Personnel ==
- Moses "Beenie Man" Davis – primary artist, vocals, producer, arranger
- Lowell Fillmore "Sly" Dunbar – guest artist, producer, arranger
- Robbie Shakespeare – guest artist, producer, arranger
- Dean Fraser – guest artist
- Lloyd "Gitsy" Willis – producer, arranger
- A.R.P. – guest artist, background vocals
- Mark "Buju Banton" Myrie – guest artist, producer, arranger
- "Little Kirk" Davis – guest artist, background vocals
- Marion "Lady Saw" Hall – guest artist, background vocals
- Bob Patin – background vocals, producer, arranger
- 56 Crew – background vocals
- Michael Mendez – background vocals
- Nicola Tucker – background vocals
- J.C. Lodge – background vocals
- Prilly Hamilton – background vocals
- Marie "Twiggi" Gittens – background vocals
- Michelle Jackson – background vocals
- Steven "Lenky" Marsden – producer
- Jeremy Harding – producer, mixing, engineering
- David Cole – producer
- Tony "CD" Kelly – producer, arranger, mixing, engineering
- Andrew Thomas – producer, mixing, engineering
- Handel Tucker – producer, arranger, mixing
- Hugh "Cuban" Palmer – mixing, engineering
- Steven Stanley – mixing
- Collin "Bulby" York – mixing
- Delroy "Fatta" Pottinger – mixing, engineering
- Brendan Harkin – mixing, engineering
- Paul Tyrell – assistant producer
- Ralston McKenzie – assistant producer
- Jason Bloomfield – engineering
- Mark "Stumpy" Brown – engineering
- Marlon Cooke – engineering
- Michael Cooper – engineering
- Raymond Ledgister – engineering
- Garfield McDonald – engineering, mixing
- Dean Mundy – engineering, editing
- The Shocking Vibes Crew – arranger, project coordinator
- Joel Chin – mastering
- Paul Shields – mastering
- Patrick Roberts – executive producer
- David Sanguinetti – project coordinator
- Leroy Champaign – artwork, design, layout design
- Clyde McKenzie – art direction, design
- Jason Frater – illustrations
- Brian Jahn – photography
- Maxine Stowe – liner notes
- James Goring – stylist

== Charts ==
Chart (1998)	Peak position
UK Independent Albums (OCC)	21
US Billboard 200	151
US Top R&B/Hip-Hop Albums (Billboard)	35
US Reggae Albums (Billboard)	1
US Heatseekers Albums (Billboard)	5
