= Art and Life =

Studio album by Beenie Man
- Released: 11 July 2000
- Studio: The Boxx (Kingston, Jamaica); Right Track Studios (New York, NY); Soundtrack Studios (New York, NY); Electric Lady Studios (New York, NY); Penthouse Recording Studio (Kingston, Jamaica); The Crib Recording Studio (New York, NY); Studio 2000 (Kingston, Jamaica); The Idea Lounge (Kingston, Jamaica); Grove Music Studio (Jamaica); Shocking Vibes Production Studio (Kingston, Jamaica)
- Genre: Dancehall; reggae
- Length: 1:10:14
- Label: Virgin
- Producer: Dave Kelly; Eddison Electrik; King Jammy; Louis "Flabba" Malcolm; Salaam Remi; Steely & Clevie; The Neptunes; The Shocking Vibes Crew; Tony "CD" Kelly

Beenie Man chronology
Y2K (1999)	Art and Life (2000)	Youth Quake (2001)

Singles from Art and Life
- 1. "Love Me Now" Released: 2000; 2. "Girls Dem Sugar" Released: September 14, 2000

Art and Life is the twelfth studio album by Jamaican deejay Beenie Man. It was released on 11 July 2000 via Virgin Records. Recording sessions took place at The Boxx, Penthouse Recording Studio, Studio 2000, The Idea Lounge, Grove Music Studio and Shocking Vibes Production Studio in Jamaica and at Right Track Studios, Soundtrack Studios, Electric Lady Studios and The Crib Recording Studio in New York City. Production was handled by The Shocking Vibes Team, Salaam Remi, The Neptunes, Dave Kelly, Eddison Electrik, King Jammy, Louis "Flabba" Malcolm, Steely & Clevie and Tony "CD" Kelly, with Alma Castellanos and Raul del Sol serving as additional producers. It features guest appearances from Wyclef Jean, Arturo Sandoval, Kelis, Mýa, Redman, Steve Perry, Tanto Metro and Devonte.

The album peaked at number 68 on the Billboard 200, number 18 on the Top R&B/Hip-Hop Albums and atop the Reggae Albums charts in the United States and at number 27 on the Official Hip Hop and R&B Albums Chart in the United Kingdom. At the 43rd Annual Grammy Awards held in 2001, the album won a Grammy Award for Best Reggae Album.

Its lead single managed to reach number 90 on the US Hot R&B/Hip-Hop Songs chart. The second single off of the album, "Girls Dem Sugar", peaked at number 54 on the US Billboard Hot 100 chart and number 13 on the UK singles chart.

== Critical reception ==
Professional ratings
Aggregate scores
Source	Rating
Metacritic	77/100
Review scores
Source	Rating
All About Jazz	4/5 stars
AllMusic	3/5 stars
NME	3.5/5 stars
Now	3/5 Ns
RapReviews	8/10
Rolling Stone	3.5/5 stars
Spin	7/10
The Village Voice	(3-star Honorable Mention)

Art and Life was met with generally favorable reviews from music critics. At Metacritic, which assigns a normalized rating out of 100 to reviews from mainstream publications, the album received an average score of 77, based on eight reviews.

Dele Fadele of NME praised the album, describing it as "diasporic dancehall reggae, spruced up and polished around the edges, but essentially retaining the artist's signature style". Ben Ratliff of Rolling Stone stated: "without being defined by any particular rhetorical or ideological position, he's made a breezy but severely eclectic record". Robert Christgau of The Village Voice described the album as "hip hop plus salsa plus r&b plus more r&b equals pure reggae crossover", highlighting songs "Analyze This" and "Girls Dem Sugar".

== Track listing ==
No.	Title	Writer(s)	Producer(s)	Length
1.	"Haters and Fools"	Moses Davis; Dave Kelly	Dave Kelly	4:00
2.	"Ola" (featuring Steve Perry)	Davis; Pharrell Williams; Chad Hugo	The Neptunes	4:04
3.	"Love Me Now (Rockwilder Remix)" (featuring Wyclef Jean and Redman)	Davis; Wyclef Jean; Salaam Remi Gibbs; Anthony Criss; Vincent Brown; Keir Gist; Alphonso Mizell; Frederick Perren; Dennis Richards; Berry Gordy	Salaam Remi	3:49
4.	"Girls Dem Sugar" (featuring Mýa)	Davis; Williams; Hugo	The Neptunes	4:17
5.	"Crazy Notion"	Davis	Louis "Flabba" Malcolm	3:59
6.	"Original Tune"	Davis	The Shocking Vibes Team	3:26
7.	"Jamaica Way" (featuring Kelis)	Davis; Williams; Hugo	The Neptunes	4:35
8.	"Love Me Now" (featuring Wyclef Jean)	Davis; Jean; Gibbs; Criss; Brown; Gist; Mizell; Perren; Richards; Gordy	Salaam Remi	5:18
9.	"Art and Life"	Davis	The Shocking Vibes Team	4:20
10.	"Analyze This"	Davis; Wycliffe Johnson; Cleveland Browne	Steely & Clevie	3:57
11.	"Heights of Great Men"	Davis	King Jammy	3:42
12.	"9 to 5"	Davis; D. Kelly	Dave Kelly	3:50
13.	"Trust Me"	Davis; Anthony Kelly	Tony "CD" Kelly	3:46
14.	"Tumble (La Caida)" (featuring Arturo Sandoval)	Davis; Clyde McKenzie	The Shocking Vibes Team; Alma Castellanos (add.); Raul del Sol (add.)	4:13
15.	"Some Tonight" (featuring Tanto Metro and Devonte)	Davis; Mark Wolfe; Wayne Passley; Lowell Dunbar; Patrick Roberts	The Shocking Vibes Team	3:54
16.	"The Best That I Got"	Davis	The Shocking Vibes Team	4:50
17.	"I've Got a Date"	Davis; Gibbs; Eddison Sainsbury	Salaam Remi; Eddison Electrik	4:14
Total length:				1:10:14

Sample credits

- Track 8 contains portions of "O.P.P." written by Anthony Criss, Vincent Brown, Keir Gist, Alphonso Mizell, Frederick Perren, Dennis Richards and Berry Gordy.

== Charts ==
Chart (2000)	Peak position
UK R&B Albums (OCC)	27
US Billboard 200	68
US Top R&B/Hip-Hop Albums (Billboard)	18
US Reggae Albums (Billboard)	1
