= King of the Dancehall (song) =

Single by Beenie Man

from the album Back to Basics
- Released: August 24, 2004
- Genre: Dancehall
- Length: 3:37
- Label: Virgin
- Songwriter(s): M. Davis, Maurice Gregory, T. Kelly
- Producer(s): Tony "CD" Kelly

Beenie Man singles chronology
"Compton" (2004)	"King of the Dancehall" (2004)	"Soul on Fire" (2005)

"King of the Dancehall" is the second single by Beenie Man from his studio album Back to Basics. It was written by Tony Kelly, Maurice Gregory, and Beenie Man himself. It was produced by Tony "CD" Kelly.

== Charts ==
Chart (2004)	Peak position
U.S. Billboard Hot 100	80
U.S. Billboard Hot Rap Tracks	22
U.S. Billboard Hot R&B/Hip-Hop Songs	26
UK Singles Chart	14

== Release history ==
Region	Date	Format(s)	Label(s)	Ref.
United States	July 26, 2004	Rhythmic contemporary radio	Virgin	
