= Panjabi Hit Squad =

- Origin: London, England
- Genres: Bhangra
- Labels: Tiger, Def Jam
- Website: panjabihitsquad.com

Panjabi Hit Squad are British DJs, producers and radio broadcasters for BBC Asian Network and formerly BBC 1Xtra. The group recorded several albums, including Desi Beats Vol 1 with Def Jam. They have won the UK Asian Music Awards three times, in 2003, 2005 and 2012. They produced two albums for Ms Scandalous, Ladies First and Aag.

== Career ==
Panjabi Hit Squad started their broadcasting career on BBC 1Xtra in 2002 where they hosted the Desi Beats show on Monday nights from 12–2am. In 2003, the show moved time slots to Thursday night from 10pm–12am. They won two UK Asian Music Awards (UK AMA) for Best Radio DJ, in 2003 and 2005. In 2007, Panjabi Hit Squad started to host their own show on BBC Asian Network on Saturdays from 6pm–9pm. In 2012, they won the UK AMA for Best Club DJ.

Panjabi Hit Squad hosted their own 2 hour mix show on the in-flight systems of every Emirates flight.

== Discography ==
=== Albums ===
Statistics	Singles
The Album: Released: 2001; Label: Indiasound/Tiger	"Shaher"; "Dil Churaliya feat Dee"; "Paun Bhangra"
The Streets: Released: 2002; Label: Tiger	"Jawani"; "Dil Churaliya remix feat Dee"; "Kuriyeh"; "Hai Hai"
Desi Beats E.P.: Released: 2002; Label: AV8 Records	"Get Crunked Up"; "Bhangra Pauna"; "Stolen(Dil) Feat Jay-Z"; "Sharaab"
Desi Beats Vol.1: Released: 2003; Label: Def Jam UK	"Hai Hai Remix"; "Mittran De"; "Fantasy Feat Dee"; "Shere Panjabi"
World Famous: Released: 2012/2013; Label: Major Moves/Universal Music India; "DIl Mera peak position: Number 1 (UK Asian Download Chart); "Fulkari peak position: Number 3 (UK Asian Download Chart); "Shake It peak position: Number 10 (UK Asian Download Chart)	"Miss Soniyeh"; "Dil mera Feat Rahat Fateh Ali Khan"; "Fulkari"; "DISCO Feat Richa Sharma & Krishna Beuru"; "Sun Mundeya"; "Thoda Thoda"; "Shake It"; "World Famous Boliyan"; "Meri Jaan"
