= Girls Dem Sugar =

Single by Beenie Man featuring Mya

from the album Art and Life and Sugar & Spice (Perfect Edition)
- Released: September 14, 2000
- Recorded: 1999
- Genre: Reggae fusion; R&B
- Length: 4:17
- Label: Virgin
- Songwriters: Moses Davis; Pharrell Williams; Charles Hugo; Cleveland Browne; Wycliffe Johnson
- Producer: The Neptunes

Beenie Man singles chronology
"'Love Me Now'" (2000)	"Girls Dem Sugar" (2000)	"Fresh From Yard" (2002)

Mya singles chronology
"Best of Me, Part 2" (2000)	"Girls Dem Sugar" (2000)	"Free" (2000)

Girls Dem Sugar is a song by Jamaican deejay Beenie Man featuring American singer Mya. The track was produced by The Neptunes for Davis' 2000 studio album Art and Life and inspired and conceptualized from his 1997 hit single "Who Am I (Sim Simma)". "Girls Dem Sugar" was written by Beenie Man, Pharrell Williams, and Chad Hugo. The song was also released on the perfect edition of Mýa's fifth studio album, Sugar & Spice (2008).

"Girls Dem Sugar" was released September 14, 2000 in the United States as the second single from Davis 2000 studio album Art and Life. The single achieved minor successes on Billboard's Hot 100 chart; peaking at No. 54 and No. 16 on Billboard's Hot R&B/Hip-Hop Songs chart. The single was a success internationally; it peaked at No. 13 in the United Kingdom. The song was included on Billboard's 12 Best Dancehall & Reggaeton Choruses of the 21st Century at number seven and ranked 84th on Billboard's 100 Greatest Songs of 2000 list.

== Background ==
In a retrospect interview with BET, Beenie Man recalls creating "Girls Dem Sugar" with Pharrell. According to Beenie Man, "It was not my idea; it was Pharrell's." Commenting, "He had this great idea to remake "Who Am I (Sim Simma)" adding Pharrell "also came up with the catchy chorus." "So he [Pharrell] goes, '(Sim simma) Beenie Man, ah dem girls dem sugar / (Sim simma) The girls dem world class lover,' and that's how it was put together. And we got a Grammy Award for it. It was a great thing, and then we put Mýa on the track and the rest was history."

== Reception ==
- AllMusic gave the song a positive review:

The 1997 original, entitled "Who Am I (Sim Simma)", was a Jamaican smash, which crossed over into American markets extremely well reaching peaks of #6 on the US Billboard Hot Rap Singles charts and No. 15 on the Hot R&B/Hip Hop singles charts. It was a simmering dancehall hit that confirmed the nickname that Beenie Man's father had given the DJ as a child, what with the young boy's winning ways with the little ladies. Years have passed, but Beenie's charms have only grown, and on "Girls Dem Sugar", they flower fully.

However, it took the help of The Neptunes and featured artist Mýa to add a new sound and style for international crowds.The song quickly became a smash hit at urban dance clubs and urban radio in the U.S

This version is notably different from the original, with the production team creating a stuttering rhythm, shot through with old school scratching, whilst simultaneously conjuring up a rich and romantic atmosphere, fed by Mýa's sweet, sultry vocals. The song quickly became a smash hit on urban radio and in urban dance clubs. It is considered somewhat of a classic dancehall song because of its crossover appeal and its ability to get partygoers on the dancefloor.

And while Mýa sweetly coos about being his girl, Beenie "zagga zagga"'s along, in between chatting her up and bragging how badly all the girls need him. And so it seemed, for "Sugar" shot up the charts around the world, and in the UK even entered the Top 15.

== Track listing ==
U.S. 12" Single & Vinyl Single
A1 Girls Dem Sugar (Radio Edit) – 3:57
A2 Girls Dem Sugar (Album Version) – 4:17
A3 Girls Dem Sugar (Instrumental) – 4:18
B1 Ola – 4:05
B2 Ola (Instrumental) – 4:05

UK 12" Single & Vinyl Single
A1 Girls Dem Sugar (Architechs Main Mix)
A2 Girls Dem Sugar (Architechs Instrumental)
B1 Girls Dem Sugar (Colin Emanuel Extended Mix)
B2 Girls Dem Sugar

Jamaica 7" Single & Vinyl Single
A Girls Dem Sugar
B Girls Dem Sugar Instrumental

== Charts ==
Chart (2000–2001)	Peak position
Scotland Singles (OCC)	58
UK Singles (OCC)	13
US Billboard Hot 100	54
US Hot R&B/Hip-Hop Songs (Billboard)	16
US Rhythmic Airplay (Billboard)	38
