= Beenie Man =

Jamaican dancehall DJ (born 1973)

Beenie Man OD
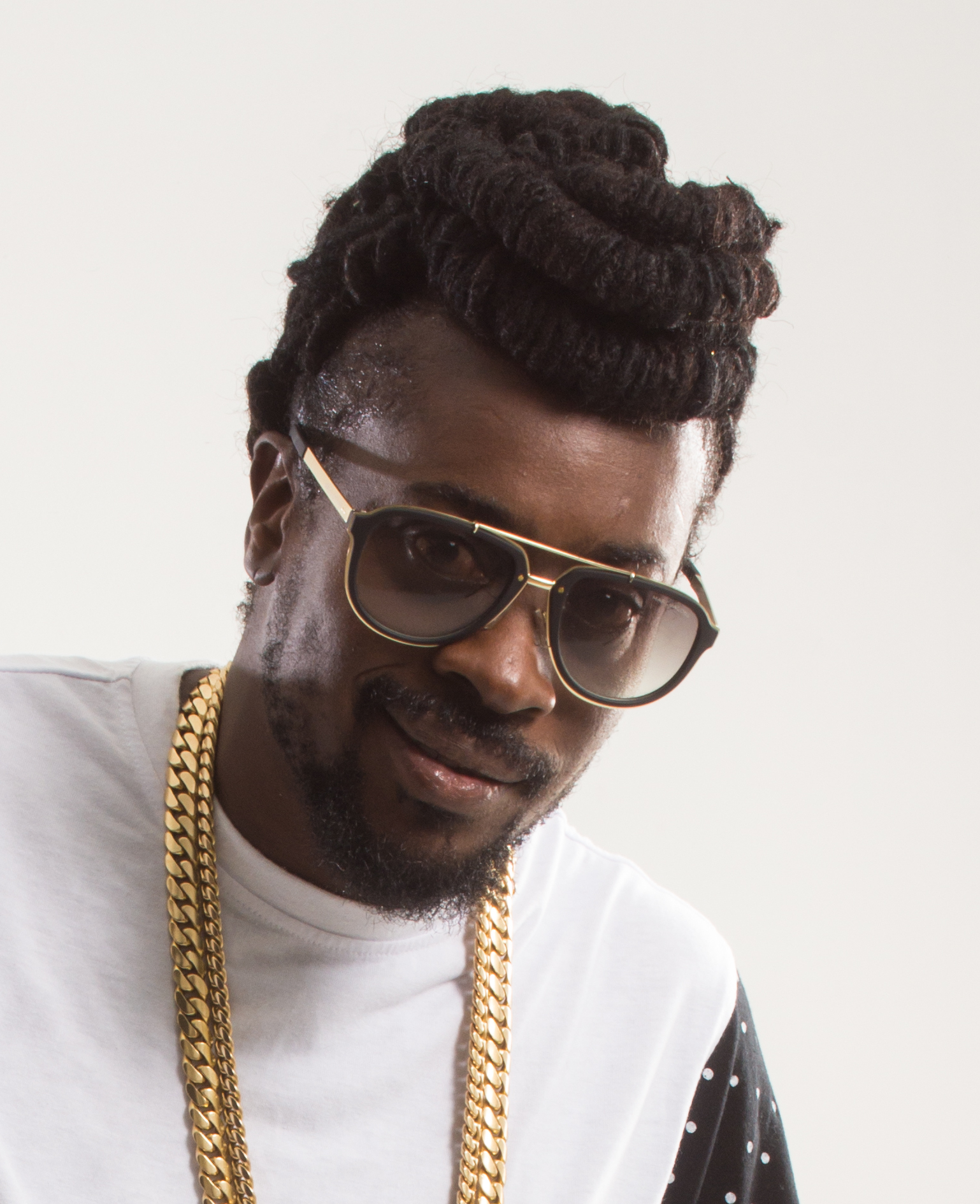
- Beenie Man in 2017
- Born: Moses Anthony Davis; 22 August 1972 (age 54); Kingston, Jamaica
- Other names: Ras Moses; The Doctor; The Girls Dem Sugar
- Occupations: Deejay; singer; songwriter; actor
- Years active: 1979–present
- Spouse: D'Angel (m. 2006; div. 2011)
- Children: 12
- Musical career
- Genres: Dancehall; reggae fusion; ragga
- Labels: Virgin; VP; MD Entertainment

Moses Anthony Davis (born 22 August 1972), known professionally as Beenie Man, is a Jamaican dancehall DJ. His awards include DJ of the Year Award eight years in a row. His twelfth studio album Art and Life received a Grammy Award in 2001.

== Biography ==
Davis was born in the Waterhouse district of Kingston in 1972. He was involved in the music industry from a young age, started toasting at the age of five, and was encouraged by his uncle Sydney Knowles, who played drums for Jimmy Cliff. He won the Tastee Talent contest in 1981, and Radio DJ Barry G introduced him to local sound system operators, who helped to establish the popularity of the young deejay, who became known as Beenie Man. He recorded his debut single, "Too Fancy", with record producer Henry "Junjo" Lawes in 1981, with Lawes also including him on the 1983 album Junjo Presents Two Big Sounds alongside established stars such as Dillinger, Fathead, and Ringo. His debut album, The Invincible Beenie Man: The Ten Year Old DJ Wonder was produced by Bunny Lee and released in 1983, his first hit single following the same year with the Winston Holness-produced "Over the Sea". In 1984 Beenie Man recorded some material with Barrington Levy (released ten years later), but his music career was put on hold while he finished school, and spent time travelling to the United Kingdom, United States, and Canada. He was robed and crowned as King of the Dancehall at the music festival called Reggae Sumfest in July of 2009.

=== 1990s return ===
Beenie Man continued performing and honed his craft beside the then dominant dancehall figures including Ninjaman, Admiral Bailey and Shabba Ranks. He found his artistic home at the Shocking Vibes studio where he continued to record singles with only moderate success in the early 1990s. His career gained momentum after a performance at the Reggae Sunsplash festival in 1992, and a rivalry with Bounty Killer began the following year after Beenie Man was accused of stealing Bounty Killer's style and catch phrases. The rivalry was captured on the 1994 album Guns Out, with the two artists settling the feud with a soundclash. Beenie Man had his first number one single in Jamaica in 1993 with "Matie" (Produced by Ephraim Barrett, Donovan and Dave Mills on the Shelly Power Records label) and he won the DJ of the Year Award the same year, the first of eight consecutive awards.

=== International stardom ===
Partially as a result of prodding from his producers, Sly and Robbie, with whom he recorded cover versions of Bob Marley's "Crazy Baldhead" and "No Woman No Cry" in 1994, the latter a Jamaican chart-topper, Beenie Man converted to the Rastafari movement, as did several of his contemporaries at the time, although in 2005 he stated "I have not converted. I was baptised an Ethiopian Orthodox and at the age of 10 I became a Judah Coptic." In 1994, he was signed by Island Records and released the critically acclaimed album Blessed, which established his reputation internationally. In 1995 he toured the United Kingdom and joined up again with Barrington Levy to record an updated jungle version of Levy's "Under Mi Sensi".

In 1995, Beenie Man collaborated with Dennis Brown and Triston Palma to release Three Against War and Mad Cobra and Lieutenant Stitchie on Mad Cobra Meets Lt. Stitchie & Beenie Man. He also collaborated with Lady Saw on "Healing", Sanchez on "Refugee", and Michael Prophet on "Gun 'n' Bass", further establishing his reputation. He took another step up the ladder in 1996, releasing the seminal Maestro, produced by Patrick Roberts and shot him to UK fame. During the period from the mid to late 1990s, Beenie Man dominated the Jamaican charts to the extent that he perhaps had a good claim to the crown of "Dancehall King", a title only bestowed previously on Yellowman in the early 1980s. Beenie Man's first real break into the United States came in 1997. He heard an instrumental rhythm by an unknown producer named Jeremy Harding, and demanded to add his voice to the rhythm. So this was the birth of his first international hit; he recorded "Who Am I" and the single quickly went Gold. It opened the doors for the world to see a new reggae star in the pages of Newsweek and other major media outlets. The same year, Beenie Man topped the Jamaican singles chart with seven different singles.

Beenie Man appeared as himself in the 1997 film Dancehall Queen.

In 1998, Beenie Man headlined Reggae Sunsplash and signed to Virgin Records to release albums in the United States. His first American offering was The Doctor (1998). During the late 1990s, Beenie Man began his conquest of America with the hits, "Romie", "Who Am I", and "Girls Dem Sugar", which featured American R&B singer, Mýa. During this time he received an impressive number of international music awards including a MOBO Award for Best International Reggae Act in 1998, while remaining at the top of the local charts. In 2000, Beenie Man released Art & Life, which featured Arturo Sandoval and Wyclef Jean (The Fugees), for which received a Grammy Award for Best Reggae Album. In the same year he co-produced (with Wyclef Jean) the debut album by actor Steven Seagal. Beenie Man, like many dancehall artists, is outspoken on a number of social issues, as exemplified by songs such as "Steve Biko" and "Murderer".

In 2002, he had a sizeable hit with a duet with Janet Jackson called "Feel It Boy", but his biggest break in America came in early 2004 with the release of a remix of "Dude", featuring guest vocals by fellow Jamaican Ms. Thing as well as rhymes by Shawnna. He thus cemented his fan base on both sides of the Atlantic.

He had hits in the United Kingdom in 1998 with "Who am I" (#10), in 2003 with "Street Life" (#13) and "Feel It Boy" (#9), a duet with Janet Jackson, and in 2004 with "Dude" (#7) and "King of the Dancehall" (#14). Also in 2004, The Associated Press observed that Beenie Man had "become a name-brand artist worldwide" and called him "king of the dancehall reggae scene".

He was also a judge for the 6th annual Independent Music Awards to support independent artists' careers.

In April 2008, it was announced that Beenie Man was to co-write and star in the film Kingston. In October 2010, Beenie Man came out with the EP I'm Drinking Rum and Red Bull, which included four songs, "Im drinking Rum and Red Bull", "I'm Okay", and two versions of "Stack and Pile". He later released the full album on 28 February 2011. "Im Drinking Rum and Red Bull" features Future Fambo. In September 2008, Beenie Man was cleared of charges of tax evasion.

In April 2009, Beenie Man signed with Brookland Entertainment, a new record label formed by Eric Nicks and The Trackmasters, in preparation to release his new album The Legend Returns, the music video for the release of his new single "Gimme Gimme" being shot in Canada on 18 April 2009. The song "Let's Go" was released on the Overproof Riddim compilation album in 2011.

In 2014, Beenie Man and long-term rival Bounty Killer put aside their differences and recorded a single together, "Legendary". The two performed a well-received Verzuz battle together on Instagram during the COVID-19 pandemic quarantine on 23 May 2020. Around that time, Vibe described them as "two of the most legendary icons in dancehall."

In May 2025, Beenie Man's songs "I'm Okay" and "I’m Drinking Rum and Red Bull" were featured in a clue on the television quiz show Jeopardy!. The $400 clue, part of a reggae category, read: “I’m ok/I’m drinking rum and Red Bull is one of Jamaicans.com’s 12 songs in this style to get Jamaicans on the dance floor.” The contestant responded with "reggae," which was accepted as correct.

== Personal life ==
Beenie Man married Michelle "D'Angel" Downer on 22 August 2006. In June 2007, Beenie Man separated from his wife. In March 2010, they released a duet single entitled "You Are My First", although at the time they were separated. The couple filed for divorce in 2011. All legalities were completed in 2019.

== Controversy ==
=== Anti-gay lyrics ===
The lyrics to some of his songs have been criticised for inciting the murder of homosexuals. He was removed from the 2004 MTV Video Music Awards after protests by gay-rights activists. That same year, Beenie Man was stopped by police at Heathrow Airport in London, after the cancellation of a concert in the United Kingdom. He then issued an apology for the lyrics through his record company. In 2005, gay rights group OutRage! suspended their opposition to Beenie Man after he agreed not to play songs featuring homophobic lyrics, and he performed in London that year. The following year, he claimed his lyrics were anti-paedophilia, not against consensual homosexual relationships.

In 2007, it was reported that Beenie Man, along with several other artists, had signed the Reggae Compassionate Act, an agreement to cease performances of anti-gay material. He later denied that he had signed the act. As of 2010, protests have continued to cause cancellations of his concerts in some countries, including New Zealand, Belgium and the Netherlands.

In 2012, Beenie Man apologized to the gay community for his earlier homophobic lyrics: "Let me make this clear and straight. I have nothing against no one. I respect each and every human being, regardless of which race or creed, regardless of which religious belief you believe in, and regardless of which sexual preference you are, including gays and lesbian people. I respect all human...Please I am begging you do not have me up for some songs I wrote a long time ago. I love each and every one and am just begging each and everyone to do the same." In other interviews, however, he was quoted making statements such as "I never apologized" and "I told them to leave us alone, to try to understand where we are coming from." In 2015 prior to coming to New Zealand for a concert, GayNZ.com news site asked Beenie Man about the homophobic lyrics in his earlier songs. He hung up the telephone without answering.

=== Yellowman feud ===
In 2006, veteran deejay Yellowman publicly chastised Beenie Man for his hit "King of the Dancehall". Known as "King Yellowman" since the 1980s, the deejay took exception to Beenie Man proclaiming himself "king", as well as comments Beenie made regarding his appearance. Regarding the title of "king", Yellowman stated: "Him trying to make people feel like him was here before me, but him never deh here before me, because dem planning to do dem official crowning them claim say is an official crowning but dem a use some a di media as some of them organisation ...". Beenie Man made comments later that year in German-based Riddim Magazine, comparing Bounty Killer to Yellowman in appearance: "Bounty Killer is a great artiste and he's ugly, too. He's got a rough thing about him, Jamaicans like that from the Shabba Rankin' days and the King Stitt days and the Yellowman days. They like ugly people." Yellowman responded, "Him can diss me all him like, but him caan diss the Jamaican public. What kinda ting that him say inna Riddim magazine? If me ugly, him pretty, me know say me wear shirt, him wear blouse, me wear pants, him wear skirt."

== Legal issues ==
=== Court case ===
On 1 January 2021, Beenie Man was charged for breaches of the Disaster Risk Management Act (DRMA) and the Noise Abatement Act after he held an event in Jamaica in violation of measures to combat the COVID-19 pandemic.

== Filmography ==
Year	Title	Role	Notes
2016	King of the Dancehall	Narrator	Feature film directed by Nick Cannon
