= 36th Tokyo International Film Festival =

2023 Japanese film festival

- Official poster of the 36th Tokyo International Film Festival
- Opening film: Perfect Days
- Closing film: Godzilla Minus One
- Location: Tokyo, Japan
- Founded: 1985
- No. of films: 15 (in Competition)
- Festival date: 23 October–1 November 2023
- Website: 2023.tiff-jp.net/en/

Tokyo International Film Festival
- 37th 35th

The 36th Tokyo International Film Festival is film festival that took place from October 23 to November 1, 2023. German filmmaker Wim Wenders served as jury president.

The official poster for the festival was created by fashion designer Koshino Junko and features actor and filmmaker Eiji Okuda alongside his daughter, director Momoko Ando and pays homage to Yasujirō Ozu's film Tokyo Story on the 120th anniversary of his birth. The festival organisers plans to honour Ozu and showcase his films throughout the festival.

The festival opened with Wim Wenders' Perfect Days and closed with Takashi Yamazaki's Godzilla Minus One.

== Juries ==
The juries consists of the following members:

=== Main competition ===
- Wim Wenders, German filmmaker, writer and photographer – Jury president
- Albert Serra, Spanish director
- Kunizane Mizue, Japanese producer
- Trần Thị Bích Ngọc, Vietnamese producer
- Zhao Tao, Chinese actress and producer

=== Asian Future ===
- Markus Nornes, American Professor of Asian Cinema at University of Michigan – Jury president
- Raymond Red, Filipino director
- Takei Miyuki, Japansese President of Film Distribution Company MOVIOLA

== Venues ==
The following 8 venues will host the festival screenings.

- Marunouchi TOEI
- Marunouchi Piccadilly
- Hulic Hall Tokyo
- Tokyo Midtown Hibiya
- Toho Cinemas Chanter
- Kadokawa Cinema Yurakucho
- Humantrust Cinema Yurakucho
- Cine Switch Ginza

== Official Selection ==
=== Competition ===
The following films were selected to compete for the Tokyo Grand Prix.

English Title	Original Title	Director(s)	Production Country
(Ab)normal Desire	正欲	Kishi Yoshiyuki	Japan
Air	ВОЗДУХ	Alexey German Jr.	Russia
Blind at Heart	Die Mittagsfrau	Barbara Albert	Germany, Switzerland, Luxembourg
Dwelling by the West Lake	草木人间	Gu Xiaogang	China
A Foggy Paradise	曖昧な楽園	Kotsuji Yohei	Japan
Gondola		Veit Helmer	Germany, Georgia
The Gospel of the Beast		Sheron Dayoc	Philippines
A Long Shot	老枪	Gao Peng	China
The Persian Version		Maryam Keshavarz	United States
Roxana		Parviz Shahbazi	Iran
Sermon to the Birds	Quşlara Xütbə	Hilal Baydarov	Azerbaijan
The Settlers	Los colonos	Felipe Gálvez	Chile, Argentina, Netherlands
Snow Leopard	雪豹	Pema Tseden	China
Tatami		Guy Nattiv, Zar Amir Ebrahimi	Georgia, United States
Who Were We?	わたくしどもは	Tomina Tetsuya	Japan

=== Asian Future ===
The following films were selected to compete in the Asian Future section, which features films from Asian directors who have directed a maximum of three feature films.

English Title	Original Title	Director(s)	Production Country
Fly Me to the Moon	但願人長久	Sasha Chuk	Hong Kong
La Luna		M. Raihan Halim	Singapore, Malaysia
Madina	Мадина	Aizhan Kassymbek	Kazakhstan, Pakistan, India
Maria		Mahdi Asghari Azghadi	Iran
Real State		Anat Malz	Israel
Redlife	เรดไลฟ์	Ekalak Klunson	Thailand
Rosinante	Balık Kırgını	Baran Gunduzalp	Turkey
Sumo Didi		Jayant Rohatgi	India
Take Me to Another Planet	違う惑星の変な恋人	Kimura Satoshi	Japan
Tatsumi		Shoji Hiroshi	Japan

=== Gala Selection ===
The following films were selected to be screened as part of the Gala Selection.

English Title	Original Title	Director(s)	Production Country
All of Us Strangers		Andrew Haigh	United Kingdom
The Exorcist: Believer		David Gordon Green	United States
Full River Red	满江红	Zhang Yimou	China
Gold Boy	黄金少年	Shusuke Kaneko	Japan
Green Night		Han Shuai	Hong Kong
Kidnapped	Rapito	Marco Bellocchio	Italy, France, Germany
Kubi	首	Takeshi Kitano	Japan
Lumberjack the Monster		Takashi Miike	Japan
The Movie Emperor	红毯先生	Ning Hao	China
My (K)Night		Nakagawa Ryutaro	Japan
Next Goal Wins		Taika Waititi	United States
Poor Things		Yorgos Lanthimos	United Kingdom
The Pot-au-Feu	La Passion de Dodin Bouffant	Trần Anh Hùng	France
Shadow of Fire	ほかげ	Tsukamoto Shinya	Japan

=== World Focus ===
The following films were selected for the World Focus section, which focuses on international films.

English Title	Original Title	Director(s)	Production Country
All Ears	不虚此行	Liu Jiayin	China
Anselm / Somebody Comes into the Light	Anselm – Das Rauschen der Zeit / Somebody Comes into the Light	Wim Wenders	Germany, Japan
Dante		Pupi Avati	Italy
Essential Truths of the Lake		Lav Diaz	Philippines, France, Portugal, Singapore, Italy, Switzerland, United Kingdom
The Fisher		Paul Soriano	Philippines
Love Is a Gun	愛是一把槍	Lee Hong-chi	Hong Kong, Taiwan
May	梅的白天和黑夜	Luo Dong	China
Menus-Plaisirs – Les Troisgros		Frederick Wiseman	France, United States
Music		Angela Schanelec	Germany, France, Serbia
Passages		Ira Sachs	France
20th Latin Beat Film Festival in TIFF
The Delinquents	Los delincuentes	Rodrigo Moreno	Argentina, Brazil, Luxembourg, Chile
Sorcery	Brujería	Christopher Murray	Chile, Mexico, Germany
Strange Way of Life	Extraña forma de vida	Pedro Almodóvar	Spain, France
Tótem		Lila Avilés	Mexico, Denmark, France
Un amor		Isabel Coixet	Spain
Taiwan Cinema Renaissance 2023
After School	成功補習班	Blue Lan	Taiwan
Miss Shampoo	請問，還有哪裡需要加強	Giddens Ko	Taiwan
Old Fox	老狐狸	Hsiao Ya-chuan	Taiwan
Who'll Stop the Rain	青春並不溫柔	Su I-Hsuan	Taiwan
Asian Cinerama - Hong Kong Focus
Tony Leung <Masterclass> / 2046		Wong Kar-wai	Hong Kong
In Broad Daylight	白日之下	Lawrence Kan	Hong Kong
Time Still Turns the Pages	年少日記	Nick Cheuk	Hong Kong
Vital Signs	送院途中	Cheuk Wan-chi	Hong Kong
Nomad (4K Restored Director's Cut)	烈火青春	Patrick Tam	Hong Kong
Special Program: The 100th Anniversary of the Birth of Franco Zeffirelli
La Traviata (Digitally Remastered Version)		Franco Zeffirelli	Italy
Sparrow (Restored Version)	Storia di una capinera	Franco Zeffirelli	Italy, Japan
Callas Forever (Digitally Remastered Version)		Franco Zeffirelli	Italy, France, Spain, United Kingdom, Romania
Special Spotlight: Basque Cinema
20,000 Species of Bees	20.000 especies de abejas	Estibaliz Urresola Solaguren	Spain
A Deep Breath, Women Filmmakers	Arnasa Betean	Berha Gaztelumendi, Rosa Zufia	Spain
In the Company of Women	Las buenas compañías	Silvia Munt	Spain
The Rye Horn	O corno	Jaione Camborda	Spain, Portugal, Belgium
Sultana's Dream	El sueño de la Sultana	Isabel Herguera	Spain, Germany

=== Youth ===
The following films were selected for the Youth section.

English Title	Original Title	Director(s)	Production Country
Phantom Youth	Bota Jonë	Luàna Bajrami	Kosovo, France
Power Alley	Levante	Lillah Halla	Brazil, France, Uruguay
A Song Sung Blue	小白船	Geng Zihan	China

=== Nippon Cinema Now ===
The following films were selected for Nippon Cinema Now, which aims to introduce previously released Japanese films to international audiences.

English Title	Original Title	Director(s)	Production Country
Ichiko	市子	Toda Akihiro	Japan
Family		Sawa Kan	Japan
Following the Sound	彼方のうた	Sugita Kyoshi	Japan
99% Cloudy... Always	99%、いつも曇り	Sangoumi Midori	Japan
The Making of a Japanese	小学校～それは小さな社会	Ema Ryan Yamazaki	Japan, United States, Finland, France
Keep Your Left Hand Down	左手に気をつけろ	Nami Iguchi	Japan
Ryuichi Sakamoto | Opus		Sora Neo	Japan
Twilight Cinema Blues	銀平町シネマブルース	Hideo Jojo	Japan
Believers	ビリーバーズ	Hideo Jojo	Japan
Love Nonetheless	愛なのに	Hideo Jojo	Japan
On The Edge of Their Seats	アルプススタンドのはしの方	Hideo Jojo	Japan

=== Animation ===
The following films were selected for the Animation section.

English Title	Original Title	Director(s)	Production Country
Art College 1994	艺术学院	Liu Juan	China
Blue Giant		Yuzuru Tachikawa	Japan
Chicken for Linda!	Linda veut du poulet!	Chiara Malta, Sébastien Laudenbach	France, Italy
The Concierge	北極百貨店のコンシェルジュさん	Yoshimi Itazu	Japan
Deep Sea	深海	Tian Xiaopeng	China
Komada - A Whisky Family	駒田蒸留所へようこそ	Yoshihara Masayuki	Japan
Lonely Castle in the Mirror	かがみの孤城	Keiichi Hara	Japan
Robot Dreams		Pablo Berger	Spain, France
Tony, Shelly and the Magic Light	Tonda, Slávka a kouzelné světlo	Filip Pošivač	Czech Republic, Slovakia, Hungary
In This Corner (and Other Corners) of the World	この世界の（さらにいくつもの）片隅に	Sunao Katabuchi	Japan
Lu Over the Wall	夜明け告げるルーのうた	Masaaki Yuasa	Japan
On-Gaku: Our Sound	音楽	Kenji Iwaisawa	Japan

=== Japanese Classics ===
The following films were selected for the Japanese Classics section.

English Title	Original Title	Director(s)	Production Country
The Great White Tower (4K Digitally Restored Version) (1966)	白い巨塔	Satsuo Yamamoto	Japan
A Band of Assassins (1962)	忍びの者	Satsuo Yamamoto	Japan
Orochi (1925)	雄呂血	Buntarō Futagawa	Japan

=== TIFF Series ===
The following television series were selected for the TIFF Series section.

English Title	Original Title	Director(s)	Production Country
Ozu (episodes 1 - 3)		Hideo Jojo, Matsumoto Yusaku	Japan
Why Try to Change Me Now	平原上的摩西	Zhang Dalei	China

=== Shoulders of Giants ===
The following fifteen films (all with their 4K digitally restored version) were selected for the "Shoulders of Giants" section, destined to honor the 120th Anniversary of Japanese director Yasujirō Ozu.

English Title	Original Title	Director(s)	Production Country
Dragnet Girl (1933)	非常線の女	Yasujirō Ozu	Japan
I Was Born, But... (1932)	大人の見る絵本 生れてはみたけれど	Yasujirō Ozu	Japan
There Was a Father (1942)	父ありき	Yasujirō Ozu	Japan
Record of a Tenement Gentleman (1947)	長屋紳士録	Yasujirō Ozu	Japan
A Hen in the Wind (1948)	風の中の牝鶏	Yasujirō Ozu	Japan
The Munekata Sisters (1950)	宗方姉妹	Yasujirō Ozu	Japan
The End of Summer (1961)	小早川家の秋	Yasujirō Ozu	Japan
Late Spring (1949)	晩春	Yasujirō Ozu	Japan
Early Summer (1951)	麦秋	Yasujirō Ozu	Japan
Tokyo Story (1953)	東京物語	Yasujirō Ozu	Japan
Tokyo Twilight (1957)	東京暮色	Yasujirō Ozu	Japan
Equinox Flower (1958)	彼岸花	Yasujirō Ozu	Japan
Floating Weeds (1959)	浮草	Yasujirō Ozu	Japan
Late Autumn (1960)	秋日和	Yasujirō Ozu	Japan
An Autumn Afternoon (1962)	秋刀魚の味	Yasujirō Ozu	Japan

=== Akira Kurosawa's Favorite Films ===
The following films were screened as a part of a section consisting of Japanese director Akira Kurosawa favorite films.

English Title	Original Title	Director(s)	Production Country
City Lights (1931)		Charlie Chaplin	United States
The Lower Depths (1936)	Les Bas-fonds	Jean Renoir	France
The Quiet Man (1952)		John Ford	United States
The 400 Blows (1959)	Les quatre cents coups	François Truffaut	France
Throne of Blood (1957)	蜘蛛巣城	Akira Kurosawa	Japan

== Awards ==
The following awards were presented for the 36th edition:

- Tokyo Grand Prix: Snow Leopard by Pema Tseden
- Special Jury Prize: Tatami by Guy Nattiv, Zar Amir Ebrahimi
- Best Director: Kishi Yoshiyuki for (Ab)normal Desire
- Best Actor: Yasna Mirtahmasb for Roxana
- Best Actress: Zar Amir Ebrahimi for Tatami
- Best Artistic Confibution: A Long Shot by Gao Peng
- Audience Award: (Ab)normal Desire by Kishi Yoshiyuki
- Asian Future Best Film Award: Maria by Mahdi Asghari Azghadi
- Amazon Prime Video Take One Award: Gone with the Wind by Yang Liping
- Amazon Prime Video Take One Award Special Jury Prize: Be Prepared by Yasumura Emi
- Kurosawa Akira Award:
  - Gu Xiaogang
  - Mouly Surya
