= Nazanin Mandi =

American model, actor, and singer (born 1986)

- Born: Nazanin Aliza Mandighomi; September 11, 1986 (age 40); Santa Clarita, California, U.S.
- Other name: Nazanin Mandi Pimentel
- Occupations: Singer; actor; model; businessperson; life coach
- Years active: 2004–present
- Spouse: Miguel (m. 2018; div. 2022) Michael Gilroy (2026)
- Relatives: Arienne Mandi (cousin)
- Modeling information
- Height: 5 ft 4 in (163 cm)
- Hair color: Brown
- Eye color: Brown
- Manager: Authentic Management
- Musical career
- Genres: Pop; R&B
- Instrument: Vocals
- Website: www.nazaninmandi.com

Nazanin Aliza Mandighomi (/ˈnɑːzəniːn/ NAH-zuh-NEEN; born September 11, 1986), known professionally as Nazanin Mandi, is an American actress, singer, model, and life coach.

== Early life and education ==
Nazanin Mandi was born on September 11, 1986, in Valencia, California. She is of Iranian, Mexican and Native American descent. She is a cousin of Arienne Mandi.

Mandi began her modeling career at the age of 10, after being scouted by a photographer at an In-N-Out Burger. At age 15, Mandi performed Mozart's Requiem, K.626 at Carnegie Hall in New York City. During this time, Mandi attended Valencia High School, where she studied jazz and classical music as a soloist in the institution's VHS Choir, alongside actress Naya Rivera. Mandi graduated from Valencia High in June 2004.

== Career ==
=== Modeling and fashion ===
Mandi was signed to Wilhelmina Models in Los Angeles. She has modeled in print and digital editorials for Vogue, MAXIM, GQ India, Esquire Malaysia, COMPLEX, WMB 3D, Modeliste, Bella Petite, TOKSICK, Galore, Allure, CosmoGirl, Sports Illustrated, and Seventeen. Her ad campaigns include Microsoft, Ecko Unlimited, Good American, Olay, Shiseido, PrettyLittleThing, Missguided, Savage X Fenty, CoverGirl, and Smashbox Cosmetics.

On March 25, 2017, Mandi launched a collaborative collection with swimwear line, Chynna Dolls.

=== Acting and music ===
After seeing an ad on Fox Eleven News, Mandi's mother encouraged her to audition for the inaugural season of the music competition series American Idol. At the age of 15, she made it to the top 35 before being kicked off for not meeting the minimum age requirement of 16. Three years later, Mandi made her acting debut with a guest appearance on the Disney Channel television series That's So Raven. In 2005, she auditioned and competed on the UPN talent competition show R U the Girl. Vying for the opportunity to sing with TLC, Mandi made it to the top nine before being eliminated during the group performance round. Following a few stints in reality television—e.g., Shahs of Sunset, The Platinum Life—and a couple guest star roles—i.e., The Young and the Restless, Twenties—Mandi made her film debut in the 2020 romantic comedy The Last Conception. The film tells the story of an Indian-American lesbian who discovers she is the last hope of continuing her family's ancient bloodline. Mandi is also set to star in the 2021 horror film Dreamcatcher, produced by Samuel Goldwyn Films.

On July 25, 2019, Mandi released her debut single, "FOREVER MOOD", via Billboard. The track was produced by Siviwe "The Code" Mngaza, and co-executive produced by Midian Mathers and her husband, Miguel.

== Endorsements ==
In 2018, Nazanin became a brand ambassador for fashion retailer, PrettyLittleThing. Two years later, she became an ambassador for online fashion label, Missguided. In July 2020, Mandi was announced as a brand ambassador for Rihanna's size-inclusive lingerie line, Savage X Fenty. In addition to modeling for the brand's Summer and Valentine's Day ad campaigns, Mandi walked and performed alongside her husband, Miguel, in the Savage X Fenty Show Vol. 2 on October 2, 2020—which premiered on Amazon Prime Video.

== Personal life ==
At the age of 18, Mandi met singer Miguel on the set of his first music video, "Getcha Hands Up". The two exchanged numbers after Mandi interviewed the singer for a behind-the-scenes promotional DVD. The couple announced their engagement in January 2016, and were married on November 24, 2018 at Hummingbird Nest Ranch, in Simi Valley, California. Monique Lhuillier designed her wedding dress. In September 2021, the couple announced their separation, which they called off in January 2022. On October 4, 2022, Mandi filed for divorce citing irreconcilable differences. As of September 21, 2026, Mandi is engaged to partner Michael.

In addition to inspiring Miguel's Grammy-winning single, "Adorn", Mandi has stated that her debut single, "Forever Mood", is a reply to Miguel's "All I Want Is You".

=== Health and activism ===
As a young adult, Mandi struggled with body dysmorphia, depression, and anxiety—with panic attacks as part of the latter. She openly discusses overcoming her mental and eating disorder, to help promote self-love and encourage inclusive conversations regarding mental health. In August 2019, Mandi was featured in BET's "Body of Work" segment where she spoke about breaking a diet pill habit and her journey towards healthy weight maintenance. In February 2020, Mandi announced she was becoming a life coach and had plans of developing a new self-empowerment platform.

== Filmography ==
=== Film ===
Year	Title	Role	Notes	Ref
2010	Cream Soda	Lori		
2020	The Last Conception	Savarna Sikand		
2020	Savage X Fenty Show Vol. 2	Herself	Prime Originals Special	
2021	Dreamcatcher	Kya		

=== Television ===
Year	Title	Role	Notes	Ref
2001	Next Big Star	Herself	Finalist; Ed McMahon's Star Search spin-off	
2002	American Idol	Herself	Top 35 Contestant (Hollywood Week)	
2004	That's So Raven	Vicky	Episode: "Psychic Eye for the Sloppy Guy"	
2005	R U the Girl	Herself	Contestant (4 episodes)	
2006	The Janice Dickinson Modeling Agency	Herself	Episode: "Get Down to Business..."	
2011	Rockstar Academy	Herself	Series regular	
2012	Shahs of Sunset	Herself	Episode: "I Love You But I Don't Like You"	
2017	How to Make a Reality Star	Begonia	Main role (8 episodes)	
2017	The Platinum Life	Herself	Main role (4 episodes)	
2019	The Young and the Restless	Nazanin	Episode: "Episode #1.11683"	
2020	Twenties	Soraya	Episode: "You Know How I Like It"	
2021	Games People Play	Zara	Episode: "Episode #2.1"	

=== Guest appearances ===
Year	Title	Role	Notes	Ref
2018	The Real	Herself	Episode: Nazanin Mandi/Tap Out/Holiday Steals	
2020	Entertainment Tonight	Herself	Episode: SNL New Season Secrets!	

=== Commercials ===
Year	Company / Product	Title	Role	Notes	Ref
2019	Cîroc Vodka	CÎROC: What Men Want	Friend	Co-branded comedy short	
2019	What Men Want	CÎROC: What Men Want	Friend	Co-branded comedy short	
2020	Maserati	The Road Less Traveled	Herself	Produced by Vogue and GQ	

=== Music videos ===
Year	Title	Artist(s)	Ref
2006	"Getcha Hands Up" (Behind-the-scenes Promotional DVD)	Miguel	
2006	"Dime Piece" (featuring Izzy)	Nick Cannon	
2007	"Anonymous" (featuring Timbaland)	Bobby Valentino	
2011	"Girls Like You"	Miguel	
2012	"Do You..."	Miguel	
2015	"Coffee"	Miguel	

== Discography ==
Nazanin Mandi's logo was designed in 2016 by Gavin Taylor.

=== Singles ===
- "Forever Mood" (2019)

=== Music videos ===
- "Forever Mood" (2019), directed by Life Garland
