= Lonnie Chavis =

American actor

- Born: Lonnie Chavis, Jr. November 23, 2007 (age 18); Downey, California, U.S.
- Occupation: Actor
- Years active: 2015–present

Lonnie Chavis Jr. (born November 23, 2007) is an American teenage actor and activist. He is known for playing young Randall Pearson on NBC's drama, This Is Us. Chavis has been nominated for several awards and shared the win for the Screen Actors Guild Award for Outstanding Performance by an Ensemble in a Drama Series with his This Is Us cast mates. In 2017, he starred in Showtime's short lived sitcom White Famous. In 2020, Chavis starred in his first feature film, The Water Man.

== Early life ==
Chavis was born on November 23, 2007, in Downey, California. Chavis is the son of Najah and Lonnie Chavis. He has three younger brothers. In 2016, an 8-year-old Chavis made headlines when he was nearly abducted from outside his home in Long Beach, California while taking out the trash. He fought off his would-be captors and alerted his neighbor who escorted Chavis back home to his mom, who had contacted the police. As of 2017, Chavis was homeschooled.

== Career ==
In 2016, Chavis joined the cast This Is Us as a young version of Sterling K. Brown's Randall Pearson. In early 2017, Chavis appeared as a guest star in an episode of his favorite show, the Nickelodeon sitcom, The Thundermans. Later that year, Chavis appeared in an episode of The CW's Supergirl. In June 2017, Chavis was promoted to series regular in season 2 of This Is Us. Chavis would go on to star opposite Jay Pharoah in the comedy White Famous, executive produced by Jamie Foxx. Chavis revealed that the series was his first experience with improvisation. Chavis made his feature film debut in Disney's Magic Campwhich starred Adam DeVine. The 2018 theatrical release was cancelled and later streamed on Disney+. He also appeared in Kevin Hart's Guide to Black History which premiered on Netflix in 2019. Chavis also appeared in the short film Skin from Guy Nattiv. The film won the Academy Award for Best Live Action Short Film at the 91st Academy Awards.

In 2018, Chavis was cast opposite Jason Wiles in Sunny Daze, which Wiles wrote and directed. In 2019, Chavis was cast opposite Academy Award nominee David Oyelowo in Oyelowo's feature film directorial debut, The Water Man. With Chavis as the lead, the film also starred Rosario Dawson with Oprah Winfrey attached to executive produce. The film marked Chavis's feature film debut and he credited Oyelowo with making him a better actor. In 2020, Chavis was cast to star in The Boy Behind the Door, a thriller from the writing-directing team of David Charbonier and Justin Powell.

== Activism ==
In June 2018, Chavis posted a video to Instagram in response to online bullying about the gap in his teeth. Chavis said, "Braces can fix [my teeth], but like, can you fix your heart, though?" While Chavis assured concerned fans that he could handle negative comments, not everyone could, he said, with some people even being driven to suicide. While his parents typically filtered the comments, the couple showed Chavis one comment and he decided to post the video. The video garnered over 600,000 views with friends and celebrities reposting it using Chavis's own hashtag: #FixYourHeart. In October 2018, Chavis partnered with Ad Council on an anti-bullying campaign. In 2020, Chavis said "This movement is about having the accountability to correct your own actions and be better to others." In 2021, the organization launched a clothing line, for which Chavis models.

In the wake of the Murder of George Floyd and the subsequent protests, Chavis, aged 12, wrote a letter to his mother about his experiences with racism in U.S. as he struggled to verbally express his feelings. The letter was later published by People on June 17, 2020.

== Filmography ==
=== Film ===
Year	Title	Role	Notes
2018	Skin	Bronny	Short film
2019	Sunny Daze	Sean	Lead role
2020	Magic Camp	Cameron	Supporting role
2020	The Water Man	Gunner Boone	Lead role
2020	The Boy Behind the Door	Bobby	Lead role
2023	How I Learned To Fly	Eli Davis	Supporting Role

=== Television ===
Year	Title	Role	Notes
2015	Bella and the Bulldogs	Young Troy	Episode: "Dudes & Chicks"
2016-22	This Is Us	Randall Pearson	Series regular
2017	Supergirl	Marcus	Episode: "City of Lost Children"
2017	White Famous	Trevor Mooney	Series regular
2018	The 5th Quarter	Fetus Jones	Episode: "Fetus Jones"
2018	The Thundermans	Gilly	Episode: "Revenge of the Smith"
2019	Kevin Hart's Guide to Black History	Robert Smalls' son	Netflix variety special
2020	God Friended Me	C.J.	Episode: "Miracles"
2023	Lawmen: Bass Reeves	Arthur Mayberry	Recurring role

== Awards and nominations ==
Year	Ceremony	Award	Work	Result	Ref.
2017	2017 MTV Movie & TV Awards	Tearjerker	This Is Us	Won	
2017	49th NAACP Image Awards	Outstanding Performance by a Youth (Series, Special, Television Movie or Limited-series)	This Is Us	Nominated	
2018	BET Awards 2018	BET YoungStars Award	—N/a	Nominated	
2018	Gold Derby TV Awards	Ensemble of the Year	This Is Us	Nominated	
2018	24th Screen Actors Guild Awards	Outstanding Performance by an Ensemble in a Drama Series	This Is Us	Won	
2018	50th NAACP Image Awards	Outstanding Performance by a Youth (Series, Special, Television Movie or Limited-series)	This Is Us	Nominated	
2019	51st NAACP Image Awards	Outstanding Performance by a Youth (Series, Special, Television Movie or Limited-series)	This Is Us	Nominated	
2020	52nd NAACP Image Awards	Outstanding Performance by a Youth (Series, Special, Television Movie or Limited-series)	This Is Us	Nominated	
2021	BET Awards 2021	BET YoungStars Award	—N/a	Nominated	
