= Jaime Ray Newman =

American actress, producer, and singer

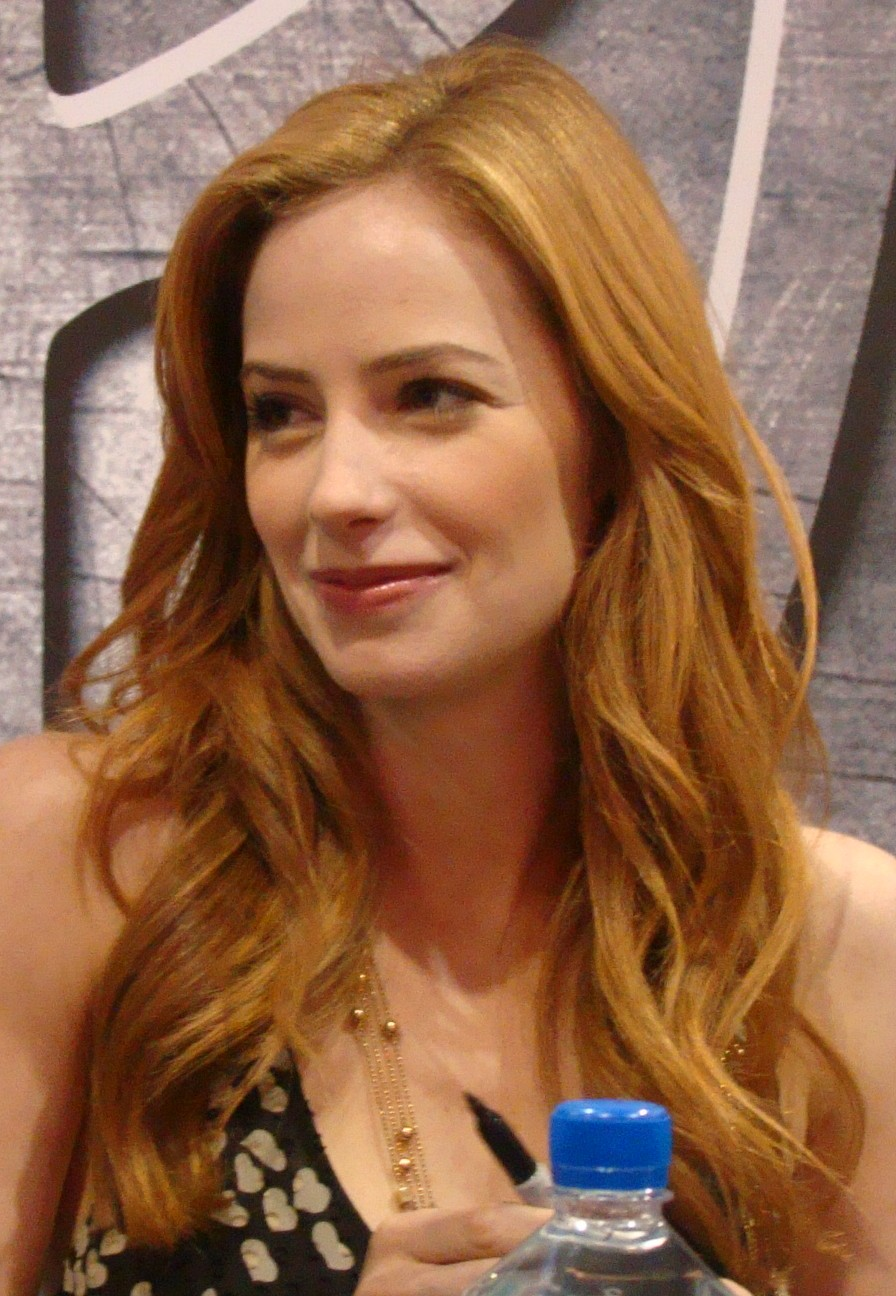
- Newman at the 2009 San Diego Comic-Con
- Born: April 2, 1978 (age 48); Farmington Hills, Michigan, U.S.
- Citizenship: American
- Education: Boston University; Northwestern University (BA)
- Occupations: Actress, singer, producer,
- Years active: 2000–present
- Spouse: Guy Nattiv (m. 2012)
- Children: 2
- Relatives: Ben Kurland (cousin)

Jaime Ray Newman (born April 2, 1978) is an American actress, producer and singer. She is known for starring as Kristina Cassadine in the soap opera General Hospital, Mindy O'Dell in the drama series Veronica Mars, Kat Gardener in the fantasy series Eastwick, Lt. Laura Cadman in the science-fiction series Stargate Atlantis, Tess Fontana in the science-fiction series Eureka, Kat Petrova in the drama-thriller series Red Widow, Sam Gordon in the comedy-drama series Mind Games, Allison Roth in the crime drama series Wicked City, and Sarah Lieberman in the Marvel series The Punisher.

Along with her husband Guy Nattiv, she won the Academy Award for Best Live Action Short Film in 2019 for producing the drama Skin (2018).

== Early life and education ==
Newman was born and raised in Farmington Hills, Michigan, to Jewish parents, Marsha Jo and Fred Newman. She has one sister, Beth Nicole, a global public relations director at J Brand. Newman started performing at age eleven in the debut of Israel Horovitz's play A Rosen by Any Other Name. She worked consistently around Detroit, acting in many of the regional theaters. Newman received her elementary education at the Jewish Hillel Day School of Metropolitan Detroit, where she starred as Ado Annie Carnes in an eighth-grade play of Oklahoma!

After Hillel, Newman attended the private Cranbrook Kingswood School in Bloomfield Hills, Michigan, and spent her summers at the Interlochen Center for the Arts where she won the Corson Award for Outstanding Achievement in Acting. While in high school at Cranbrook, she won first place in the Michigan Interscholastic Forensic Association, a statewide dramatic competition, for three years in a row. At age 16, Newman founded Apollo Theatre Productions, serving as both a producer and director. She graduated from Cranbrook in 1996. Newman then attended Boston University College of Fine Arts' theater conservatory for two years, before transferring to Northwestern University as an English and drama major.

At Northwestern, she founded the Ignition Festival for Women in the Arts. Through that, she produced and acted in Paula Vogel's Pulitzer Prize-winning play How I Learned to Drive. While living in Chicago, she performed with her own jazz quartet. Newman moved to Los Angeles in September 2000. Her cousin is actor Ben Kurland.

== Career ==
Newman first earned a living performing with her jazz quartet, and landed parts in several short films. She also made an appearance on The Drew Carey Show. Soon after, she landed the role of Kristina Cassadine on the soap opera General Hospital. While there, she continued with her music career, putting together her cover band, School Boy Crush. Newman and School Boy Crush played regularly at The Buffalo Club in Santa Monica, California; Moomba in West Hollywood; Nick's Martini Lounge; Café Cordiale; and at the Lux in Beverly Hills. The band covered a wide variety of music from funk and soul to R&B and blues. Most recently, they played the ESPN Awards party at The Highlands, the adjoining venue to the Kodak Theatre. Newman also landed a part in Steven Spielberg's Catch Me If You Can, with a scene opposite Leonardo DiCaprio.

In January 2003, Newman starred with David Schwimmer, Jonathan Silverman and Tom Everett Scott in the play Turnaround, Roger Kumble's dark Hollywood satire. In October 2006, Newman began an eight-episode run in a recurring role in the critically acclaimed CW show Veronica Mars. She also became a fan favorite with her appearance on Stargate Atlantis as Lt. Laura Cadman. Along with fellow Stargate actor Michael Shanks, she appeared in the Christmas 2006 television film Under the Mistletoe. Other high-profile guest starring roles include E-Ring, Heroes, Supernatural, Related, CSI: Crime Scene Investigation, Medium, NCIS, Grimm, CSI: NY, and Castle.

In 2007, Newman starred in Neil LaBute's play Fat Pig at the Geffen Playhouse, and in 2008, starred in LaBute's play Some Girl(s), also at the Geffen. The following year, she appeared alongside Rebecca Romijn, Lindsay Price and Paul Gross in the 2009 television adaptation of Eastwick (based on the John Updike novel The Witches of Eastwick), playing Kat Gardener, a nurse and mother of five who discovers her magical powers. In 2010, she held major recurring roles on Eureka as Dr. Tess Fontana, and on Drop Dead Diva as Vanessa Hemmings. In January 2011, Newman played Cynthia Karslake in David Auburn's revival of The New York Idea by Langdon Elwyn Mitchell at the Lucille Lortel Theatre in New York City. In 2013, she starred opposite James Van Der Beek, Kathy Baker and Chris Mulkey in the American stage premiere of the Australian play The Gift at the Geffen Playhouse.

Newman starred with Radha Mitchell in ABC's 2013 midseason drama series Red Widow. That same year, she starred in the independent psychological thriller film Altered Minds. In May 2014, it was reported that she would guest star in an episode of TNT's comedy-drama Franklin & Bash. Later, she was cast as series regular in another ABC series, Mind Games, opposite Christian Slater and Steve Zahn. In August 2014, it was announced that Newman would recur on Amazon Studios' procedural drama Bosch. In August 2015, she joined the main cast of ABC's crime drama series Wicked City. In December 2015, Newman joined the fourth-season cast of Bates Motel as the major recurring character Rebecca Hamilton, a past love interest of Sheriff Romero (Nestor Carbonell). She will star in Lech Majewski's fantasy film Valley of the Gods, opposite Josh Hartnett and Charlotte Rampling.

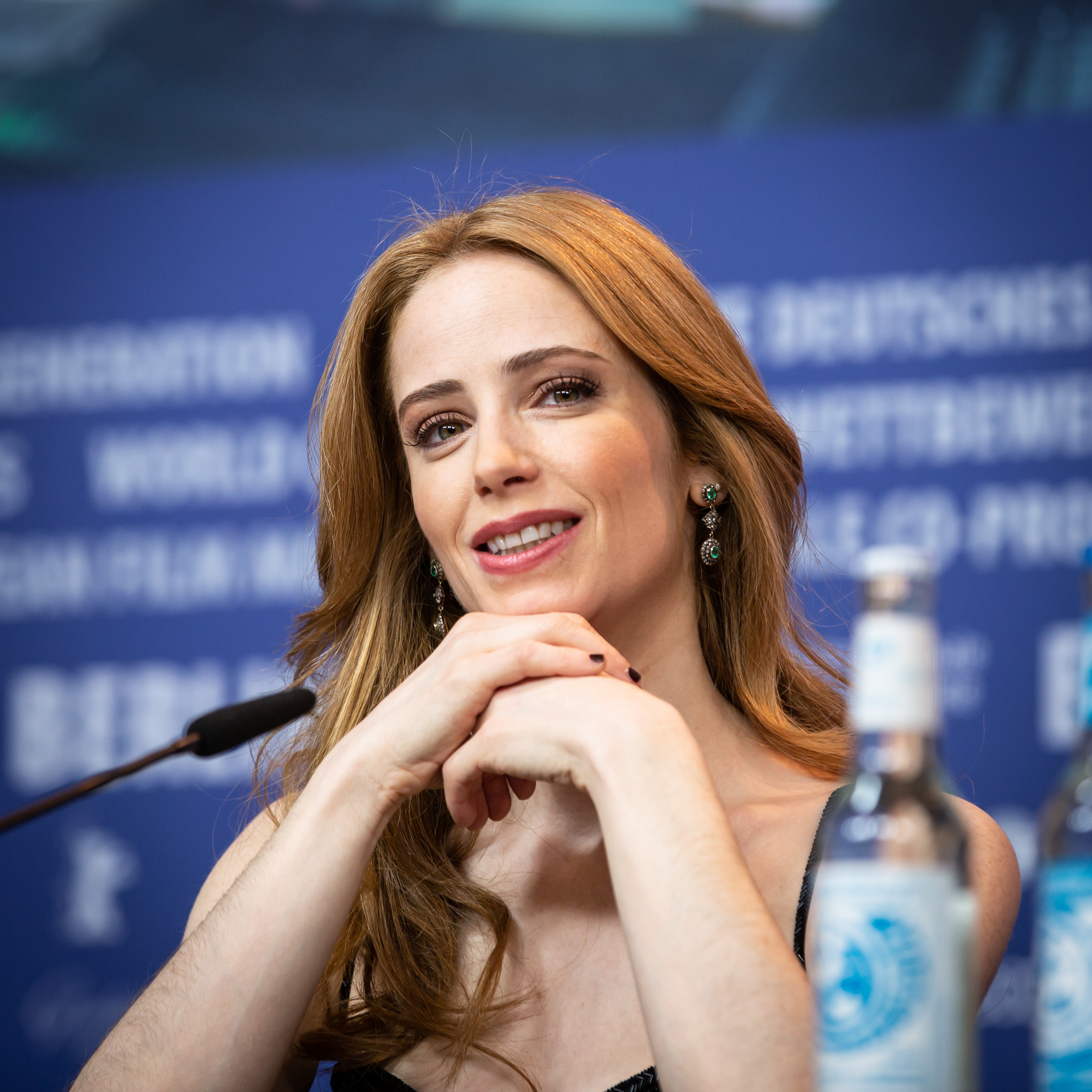
Newman at the 2019 Berlin Film Festival

In August 2016, she was cast in the recurring role of Wildred Darnell on the fifth season of TNT's procedural drama series Major Crimes. The following year, Newman began starring in the series regular role of Sarah Lieberman on Netflix's Marvel drama The Punisher, a spin-off series featuring the character from Daredevil. She then recurred as Irene McAllistair in the third season of the Syfy drama series The Magicians. Newman had a recurring role as Linda Langer in the second season of Bravo's dark comedy series Imposters. In 2018, she produced her first feature film, the biographical racial drama Skin, directed by her husband Guy Nattiv. For her work, she received the Academy Award for Best Live Action Short Film.

In 2022, Newman played Lucille Abshire in the HBO series The Time Traveler's Wife.

== Personal life ==
Newman married Israeli writer and director Guy Nattiv in Tel Aviv, on April 2, 2012 (her 34th birthday). They have two daughters.

== Filmography ==
=== Film ===
Year	Title	Role	Notes
1999	Full Blast	Bo	
2002	The Violent Kind	Amanda	
2002	Star Quality	Katie Swellhead	Short film
2002	Catch Me If You Can	Monica	
2005	Lonesome Matador	Emily	Short film
2005	Living 'til the End	Audrey Gersons	
2007	Raw Footage	Rachel Graham	Short film
2007	Sex and Breakfast	Betty	
2008	Made of Honor	Ariel	
2008	A Line in the Sand	Ann Marie	
2009	Dr. Dolittle: Million Dollar Mutts	Emmy	Voice
2009	Logorama	Dispatch Girl (Radio)	Voice
2012	Rubberneck	Danielle Jenkins	
2013	Altered Minds	Julie Shellner	
2013	Game of Assassins	Emma	
2013	Tarzan	Alice Greystoke (voice)	
2016	Heirloom	Dr. McKoy	Short film
2016	A Christmas in New York	Susan Clark	
2018	Skin	—	Short film Producer; Won – Academy Award for Best Live Action Short Film
2018	Skin	Nurse Melissa Frye	Feature-length film unrelated to the short of the same name Also producer
2019	Valley of the Gods	Laura Ecas	
2022	MK Ultra	Rose Strauss	
2023	Golda	Henry Kissinger's secretary	
2023	Tatami	Stacey Travis	Also producer
2023	Wild Summon	—N/a	Executive producer only
2024	Exhibiting Forgiveness	Janine	
2026	Harmonia	—N/a	Producer only

=== Television ===
Year	Title	Role	Notes
2001	The Drew Carey Show	Tina	Episode: "The Warsaw Closes"
2001–2003	General Hospital	Kristina Cassadine	Regular role
2003	CSI: Crime Scene Investigation	Julie Waters	Episode: "After the Show"
2003	Happy Family	Amanda	Episode: "The Doghouse"
2004	Wedding Daze	Teri Landry	Television film
2005	McBride: Murder Past Midnight	Emily Harriman	Television film
2005	Supernatural	Amanda Walker	Episode: "Phantom Traveler"
2005	Stargate Atlantis	Lt. Laura Cadman	2 episodes
2006	Crossing Jordan	Cpt. Gwen Osbourne	Episode: "Code of Ethics"
2006	Bones	Stacy Goodyear	Episode: "The Woman in the Car"
2006	Related	Kylie Stewart	2 episodes
2006	Medium	Angela Saunders / Jade	Episode: "A Changed Man"
2006	Under the Mistletoe	Susan Chandler	Television film
2006	Hollis & Rae	Hollis Chandler	Television film
2006	E-Ring	Natalie Hughes	4 episodes
2006–2007	Veronica Mars	Mindy O'Dell	8 episodes
2007	Criminal Minds	Lacy Kyle	Episode: "The Big Game"
2007	Heroes	Young Victoria Pratt	Episode: "Truth & Consequences"
2007	Marlowe	Tracy Faye	Television film
2007	I'm Paige Wilson	Paige Wilson	Television film
2008	Lincoln Heights	Sabrina Gasper	4 episodes
2008	Leverage	Aimee Martin	Episode: "The Two-Horse Job"
2009	Nip/Tuck	Daphne Pendell	2 episodes
2009	CSI: Crime Scene Investigation	Melinda Carver	Episode: "A Space Oddity"
2009	Mental	Zan Avidan	3 episodes
2009–2010	Eastwick	Katherine Gardener	Main role
2009–2010	Eureka	Tess Fontana	Main role
2010–2011	Life Unexpected	Julia	2 episodes
2010–2013	Drop Dead Diva	Vanessa Hemmings	10 episodes
2011	Royal Pains	Stacey Saxe	Episode: "Astraphobia"
2011	NCIS	Melanie Burke	Episode: "Engaged: Parts 1 & 2"
2011–2012	CSI: NY	Claire Taylor	2 episodes
2011–2012	Grimm	Angelina Lasser	2 episodes
2012	Castle	Holly Franklin	Episode: "'Til Death Do Us Part"
2013	Red Widow	Katrina Petrova	Main role
2014	Mind Games	Samantha Gordon	Main role
2014	Franklin & Bash	Cheryl Koch	Episode: "Spirits in the Material World"
2015	Bosch	Laura Kell	2 episodes
2015	Satisfaction	Kate	2 episodes
2015	Wicked City	Allison Roth	Main role
2016	Bates Motel	Rebecca Hamilton	7 episodes
2016	Major Crimes	Wildred Darnell	Episode: "White Lies: Parts 1–3"
2017	The Punisher	Sarah Lieberman	Main role
2018	The Magicians	Irene McAllistair	6 episodes
2018	Imposters	Linda	3 episodes
2018	Midnight, Texas	Patience Lucero	9 episodes
2020	Deputy	D.A. Carol Riley	4 episodes
2020	Little Fires Everywhere	Elizabeth Manwill	3 episodes
2021	Dopesick	Kathe Sackler	Miniseries
2022	The Time Traveler's Wife	Lucille Abshire	4 episodes
2023	Bel-Air	Mrs. Satterfield	Episode: "Just Like Old Times"
2024	The Rookie	Stacey Walker	Episode: "Training Day"
2024	The Big Cigar	Roz Torrance	Miniseries
2025	The Hunting Wives	Callie	8 episodes
TBA	The Murder of JonBenét Ramsey	Amelia Hunt	Upcoming series

== Stage ==
Year	Title	Role	Venue
2007	Fat Pig	Jeannie	Geffen Playhouse
2008	Some Girl(s)	Bobbi	Geffen Playhouse
2011	The New York Idea	Cynthia Karslake	Lucille Lortel Theatre
