= The Water Man (film) =

2020 American drama film

- Promotional poster
- Directed by: David Oyelowo
- Written by: Emma Needell
- Produced by: David Oyelowo; Carla Gardini; Shivani Rawat; Monica Levinson
- Starring: David Oyelowo; Rosario Dawson; Lonnie Chavis; Amiah Miller; Alfred Molina; Maria Bello
- Cinematography: Matthew J. Lloyd
- Edited by: Blu Murray
- Music by: Peter Baert
- Production companies: ShivHans Pictures; Harpo Films; Yoruba/Saxon Productions
- Distributed by: RLJE Films (United States); Netflix (International)
- Release dates: September 13, 2020 (TIFF); May 7, 2021 (United States)
- Running time: 92 minutes
- Country: United States
- Language: English
- Box office: $383,234

The Water Man is a 2020 American drama film directed by David Oyelowo, in his feature directorial debut, from a screenplay by Emma Needell. The film stars Oyelowo, Rosario Dawson, Lonnie Chavis, Amiah Miller, Alfred Molina and Maria Bello. Oprah Winfrey serves as an executive producer via her revived Harpo Films banner.

The Water Man had its world premiere at the Toronto International Film Festival on September 13, 2020, and was released in the United States on May 7, 2021, by RLJE Films.

== Plot ==
Gunner Boone is 11 and has recently moved to Pine Mills, Oregon, a small, rural town. He spends his time working on a graphic novel about a detective investigating his own death, riding his bike, and visiting a nearby bookstore to borrow detective stories and books on cancer, as his mom Mary has leukemia. As they just moved to town, he has no friends yet. Gunner's escapism comes from deep within. Gunner’s father Amos is a Marine, rarely at home. When he is around, he cannot connect well with Gunner, and accidentally destroys a painting that Gunner made of Detective Knox while attempting to get Gunner to play football with him.

Gunner comes across a local legend about the ghostly being The Water Man. Local kids pay blue-haired Jo, a grifter who claims she has seen him, indicating a scar on her neck from him as proof. Gunner, a fan of mysteries, tracks down an undertaker who thinks The Water Man may have the secret to immortality. Gunner then pays Jo to take him to the ridge where she saw The Water Man. Carrying food and supplies for the journey, they venture into the forest.

Their quest has a fairytale feel (the bookstore Gunner visits is called Once Upon a Time). Like Hansel and Gretel, he and Jo are neglected by their fathers, and explore on their own, creating a world together. The woods are full of curious things: strange sounds far off, wild horse stampedes, shiny, dark rocks hung along the way (like breadcrumbs) through the forest, a river of beetles, and at one moment it seems to snow, although it's July. The children have no idea there is a raging forest fire on the other side of the ridge, and they are moving towards it. On their journey, they disagree, solve problems, and bond.

Gunner's sketch and comic books "come to life" as he wishes himself into a magical world where a watery immortal being may save his mother. They help us see through Gunner's eyes.

In the end credits we see the finished version of Gunner's graphic novel.

== Cast ==
- David Oyelowo as Amos Boone
- Rosario Dawson as Mary Boone
- Lonnie Chavis as Gunner Boone
- Amiah Miller as Josephine Riley
- Alfred Molina as Jim Bussey
- Maria Bello as Sheriff Goodwin
- Jessica Oyelowo as Mrs. Bakemeyer
- Kenny Powell as Drowned Man
- Aaron Trainor as George Riley
- Ted Rooney as Edward Schaal
- Brianne Huggins as Sarah Schaal
- John Henry as Chuck
- Jennifer Lanier as Hospice Nurse
- Colby Dahlstrom as Preacher
- Isaac Cushman as Cemetery Mourner

== Production ==
In June 2015, it was announced David Oyelowo would direct and produce the film, from a screenplay by Emma Needell, with Oprah Winfrey set to executive produce the film under her Harpo Films banner, with Walt Disney Studios distributing. Oyelowo originally intended to simply star in and produce the film, but after the original director dropped out Needell convinced him to make his directorial debut on the project. In March 2019, it was announced Rosario Dawson, Lonnie Chavis, Amiah Miller, Alfred Molina, and Maria Bello had joined the cast of the film, with Disney no longer attached to distribute. Oyelowo said he reached out to Angelina Jolie, Nate Parker, Joel Edgerton, and Mel Gibson about acting in films they directed. The score is by Peter Baert. The film is dedicated to Victoria Oyelowo, the director's late mother.

== Release ==
The film had its world premiere at the Toronto International Film Festival on September 13, 2020. In February 2021, RLJE Films acquired U.S. distribution rights to the film, and set it for a May 7, 2021, release, with Netflix set to distribute internationally. It was then released on Netflix on July 13.

== Reception ==
On Rotten Tomatoes, the film has an approval rating of 78% based on 73 reviews, with an average rating of 6.6/10. According to Metacritic, which sampled 21 critics and calculated a weighted average score of 68 out of 100, the film received "generally favorable reviews".
