= Skin (2018 short film) =

2018 short film by Guy Nattiv

- Film poster
- Directed by: Guy Nattiv
- Screenplay by: Guy Nattiv; Sharon Maymon
- Story by: Sharon Maymon
- Produced by: Guy Nattiv; Jaime Ray Newman Andrew Carlberg; Tim Harms
- Starring: Danielle Macdonald; Jackson Robert Scott; Jonathan Tucker; Ashley Thomas; Lonnie Chavis
- Cinematography: Drew Daniels
- Edited by: Yuval Orr
- Music by: Brian McOmber
- Production companies: New Native Pictures; Studio Mao
- Distributed by: Fox Searchlight Pictures
- Release date: August 23, 2018 (HollyShorts Film Festival)
- Running time: 20 minutes
- Country: United States
- Language: English

Skin is a 2018 American short drama film, directed by filmmaker Guy Nattiv. Co-written with Sharon Maymon, the film won the Academy Award for Best Live Action Short Film at the 91st Academy Awards, marking distributor Fox Searchlight Pictures' first win in the category.

Nattiv's full-length feature Skin, also released in 2018, is not related to this film in terms of their narratives.

== Plot ==
A white family enjoys a visit at a lake with friends. Their tattoos imply the group are Neo-Nazis. Jeffrey brags that his son, Troy, can shoot a target with a rifle and takes bets on the challenge. Troy successfully shoots the target.

The group heads to a grocery store, where Christa shops for food. In the checkout line, Troy sees an African-American man, Jaydee, holding a toy. Troy and the man smile at each other. As Jaydee is checking out, Jeffrey notices the interaction and accuses Jaydee of messing with his boy. Jaydee denies it, and Jeffrey calls him a racial slur. Jaydee leaves, telling Jeffrey that he is the problem.

Jeffrey tells his friends about the dispute, and they follow Jaydee into the parking lot. Jeffrey and his friends beat Jaydee viciously while Jaydee's wife frantically calls the police from her car nearby. Troy watches the incident from the store as Christa frets. As the group leaves, Jaydee's wife holds him in the parking lot. Troy looks out the store window and makes eye contact with Jaydee's son, Bronny, who is nearly the same age.

The next evening, Jeffrey and Troy are driving home and find a van blocking the road. Jeffrey walks up to the van to make them move, but a group of black men abduct him as Troy runs after the van. Jeffrey is taken to the garage of a home, where several black men and Bronny drug and tattoo him over several days. Jaydee is there recovering.

Some time later, Jeffrey is thrown naked onto the same road where he was abducted. He sees his reflection in a window and finds his skin tattooed completely black. Inside their home, Christa wakes up to the sound of someone outside. She nervously loads a handgun and calls for help. Jeffrey attempts to wash his skin clean with water but fails. Christa orders Troy to hide under the bed and not come out.

Jeffrey forcefully enters his home. Christa, seeing what appears to be a naked, black man in her home, warns him to get out or she will shoot him. Jeffrey manages to communicate to Christa who he is, and she drops her weapon. A shot rings out, and Jeffrey collapses. Troy stands in the doorway behind Jeffrey, holding a rifle.

== Cast ==
- Jonathan Tucker as Jeffrey
- Danielle Macdonald as Christa
- Ashley Thomas as Jaydee
- Jackson Robert Scott as Troy
- Lonnie Chavis as Bronny
- Shelly Francisco as Savannah
- Johnse Allende Jr. as Idris
- Zeus Campbell as Malik
- Jared Day as Adrian
- Sam Dillon as Nasty Nate
- Ronnie Tyrone Lee as Tyree
- David Maloney as Timmy
- Jahdai Pickett as Draymond
- Katie Ryan as April
- Michael Villar as Slayer
- Bruno as Boss

== Critical reception ==
Writing for Slate, Jeffrey Bloomer called it "an idiotic parable about racist violence so breathtakingly vulgar that the audience in the theater where I saw it laughed out loud in incredulity when the lights came up", and noted it as "the worst movie to win at the Academy Awards" that year. Lisa Jensen of Good Times Santa Cruz said "it explores deeply ingrained racism and its consequences in a manner better suited to The Twilight Zone." Peter Debruge of Variety called it a "stunner" but found it "hard to take seriously at times". Glenn Heath Jr. of San Diego CityBeat said it "Simplifies a ripped-from-the-headlines tragedy, but at least has a sense of it's [sic] own ridiculousness."
