= Do You... (Miguel song) =

Single by Miguel

from the album Kaleidoscope Dream
- Released: September 18, 2012
- Recorded: Platinum Sound Recording (New York)
- Genre: Pop rock; R&B
- Length: 3:27
- Label: ByStorm Entertainment; RCA
- Songwriters: Miguel Pimentel; Jerry Duplessis; Arden Altino; Paul Pesco
- Producers: Jerry "Wonda" Duplessis; Arden "Keyz" Altino (co.); Miguel (co.)

Miguel singles chronology
"Adorn" (2012)	"Do You..." (2012)	"Power Trip" (2013)

Audio sample
- "Do You...": file; help

"Do You..." is a song by American R&B singer and songwriter Miguel. It was released on September 18, 2012, as the second single from his 2012 album Kaleidoscope Dream. It was written by producer Jerry Duplessis, co-producer Arden Altino, guitarist Paul Pesco, and Miguel, who recorded the song at Platinum Sound Recording Studios in New York City. "Do You..." is a love song built around gentle guitar strumming and a playful rhythm section. Its lyrics pose flirtatious, rhetorical questions and feature both metaphorical and literal references to narcotics, inspired in part by Miguel's occasional use of MDMA.

As a single, "Do You..." charted for eight weeks on the Billboard Hot R&B/Hip-Hop Songs, peaking at number 32. It was well received by music critics, who praised Miguel's playful delivery and cited it as a highlight on Kaleidoscope Dream. A music video for the song was filmed in Las Vegas and showed Miguel and his girlfriend Nazanin Mandi on an intimate date. He performed "Do You..." on Late Night with Jimmy Fallon and incorporated elements of Bob Marley's "Stir It Up" into the song in his other concert performances.

== Background ==
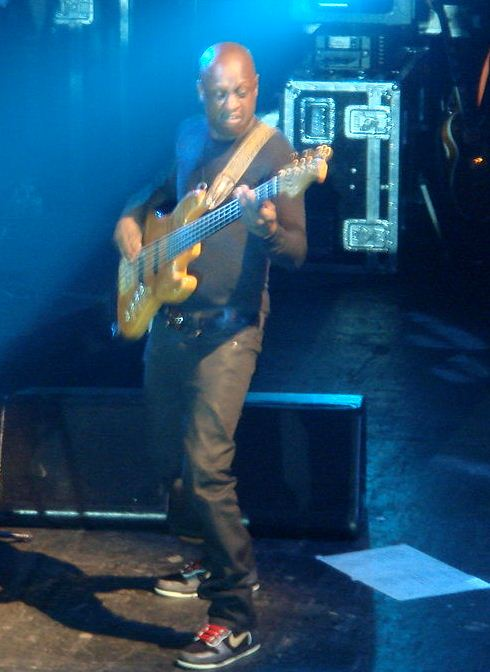
Jerry Duplessis produced and co-wrote the song.

"Do You..." was written by Miguel, producer Jerry Duplessis, co-producer Arden Altino, and guitarist Paul Pesco. It was recorded at Platinum Sound Recording Studios in New York City and mixed by engineer Manny Marroquin at Larrabee Studios in North Hollywood. The song features slap bass by Duplessis.

== Music and lyrics ==
"Do You..." is built around gentle guitar strumming and a playful rhythm section, featuring a walking bassline and double-time drums. Chris Kelly of Fact categorizes it as an atmospheric pop rock song, while Mesfin Fekadu of the Associated Press calls it "a mellow R&B outtake". The song begins with an echoed haze and acoustic guitar, with Miguel asking, "Have you ever felt alone?" It is then followed by a euphoric vocal reverb that leads to blasting drums, and Miguel asks "Do you like drugs" over a smooth guitar riff.

A wooing love song, "Do You..." poses flirtatious, rhetorical questions such as "Do you like hugs?" and "Do you like love?". Miguel melismatizes with three syllables at the end of each question, before he replies with "Well, me too." He evokes a romantic relationship with simple, imagistic lyrics: "What about matinee movies, pointless secrets / Midnight summer swims, private beaches / Rock, paper, scissors. Wait! Best out of three."

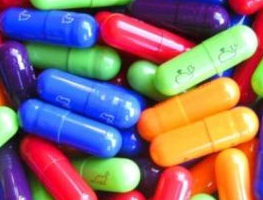
The lyrics were inspired in part by Miguel's occasional use of MDMA (shown in capsule form).

The song references drugs both metaphorically and literally, and innocently delivers a transgressive message through the use of simile: "I'm going to do you like drugs tonight". Miguel said of the song's lyrics, "I have this propensity to just come out and say things. That's how I am in real life. If I wanna know something I just ask. Like, 'Hey, do you like drugs?' Because I do! Sometimes! ... MDMA… on occasion." Alex Macpherson of The Guardian observes "faded psychedelia" and "promises of narcotic trysts" in the song's lyrics. Pitchfork Media's Carrie Battan said that "Do You..." is "not so much about being in love as about a shared love of vices."

== Release and reception ==
Not many singers could get away with lines like 'What about matinee movies' ... It's the stuff of unbearable rom-com montages, but Miguel's playful delivery brings it over.

— Andrew Ryce, Pitchfork Media

"Do You..." was originally featured on Kaleidoscope Dream: The Air Preview, which was released on September 11, 2012, as the second in a three-part series of EPs released by Miguel to preview Kaleidoscope Dream. It was released as a digital single on September 18 by ByStorm Entertainment and RCA Records. In the week of November 3, it debuted at number 49 on the Billboard Hot R&B/Hip-Hop Songs. It spent eight weeks on the chart, peaking at number 32 in the week of January 26, 2013. It also charted for 19 weeks and reached number 24 on the Hot R&B/Hip-Hop Airplay. On the R&B Songs chart, "Do You..." spent 24 weeks and peaked at number 10.

"Do You..." was well received by critics. Evan Rytlewski from The A.V. Club said the song "spins the ostensibly sleazy pickup line 'Do you like drugs?' into an irresistibly sweet proposal, imagining lovely, perfectly wasted afternoons spent in a content daze." Erin Thompson of Seattle Weekly called it a "fabulous song" and felt that "Miguel's smooth, subtle swagger is so appealing that a line like 'I wanna do you like drugs tonight' comes off as audacious instead of offensive." Rob Tannenbaum of Rolling Stone quipped, "Just when you thought there were no new ways to say 'I love you'".

In MSN Music, Robert Christgau found the lyric "Do you like drugs?" to be one of "the two most memorable lines" on Kaleidoscope Dream, while Kevin Ritchie of Now cited "Do You..." as the album's best song. Andrew Ryce from Pitchfork Media cited it as a "standout" on the album and commented that it "unfolds in an ethereal cloud of synth, voices streaming like angelic choirs before stumbling into a verse buoyed by its own euphoria." The website's Carrie Battan called "Do You..." "one of Miguel's best songs [and] also his glibbest". However, Ken Capobianco of The Boston Globe felt that its "good hook ... gets washed away by effects".

== Promotion ==
A music video for the song was released on October 3, 2012. It juxtaposes tableaus of the Great Basin Desert in Nevada with black-and-white shots of Miguel and his real-life girlfriend, actress and model Nazanin Mandi. Set in Las Vegas, the video shows them on a date, driving a 1967 Pontiac GTO convertible through the desert, "making out on a pool table, and taking a helicopter trip". Miguel and Mandi become increasingly intimate as the night progresses in the video, which is "intercut with a sequence of Miguel performing on stage in a packed nightclub".

On November 16, Miguel performed the song as a musical guest on Late Night with Jimmy Fallon. He incorporated elements of Bob Marley's 1973 reggae song "Stir It Up" into "Do You..." when performing the song live at Oracle Arena in Oakland on November 23, at Madison Square Garden in New York City on December 5, and at Shepherd's Bush Empire in London on January 14, 2013.

== Track listing ==
Digital single
No.	Title	Writer(s)	Producer(s)	Length
1.	"Do You..."	Miguel Pimentel, Jerry Duplessis, Arden Altino, Paul Pesco	Jerry "Wonda" Duplessis, Arden "Keyz" Altino (co.), Miguel (co.)	3:27

== Personnel ==
Credits adapted from liner notes for Kaleidoscope Dream.

- Arden "Keyz" Altino – co-producer
- Delbert Bowers – mixing assistant
- Tyler Bunting – assistant engineer
- Jerry "Wonda" Duplessis – producer
- Chris Galland – mixing assistant
- Koby Hass – assistant engineer
- Manny Marroquin – mixing
- Miguel – co-producer
- Michel Michelakis – additional drum programming
- Paul Pesco – guitar
- Lance Powell – assistant engineer
- Serge "Sergical" Tsai – engineer
- Kevin 'Kev-O' Wilson – assistant engineer

== Charts ==
Chart (2012–13)	Peak position
US Bubbling Under Hot 100 (Billboard)	2
US Hot R&B/Hip-Hop Songs (Billboard)	32
US R&B Songs (Billboard)	10
US Rhythmic (Billboard)	29

== Certifications ==
Region	Certification	Certified units/sales
United States (RIAA)	Gold	500,000^{‡}
^{‡} Sales+streaming figures based on certification alone.
