= The Liberation (film) =

2026 drama film by Guy Nattiv

- Theatrical release poster
- Directed by: Guy Nattiv
- Written by: Guy Nattiv; Noa Berman-Herzberg
- Produced by: Julia Lebedev; Eddie Vaisman; Oren Moverman; Guy Nattiv; Jaime Ray Newman; Steven Schneider; Roy Lee
- Starring: Carrie Coon; Bella Ramsey; Odessa Young; Lily James
- Cinematography: Tudor Vladimir Panduru; Fabian Gamper
- Edited by: Yuval Orr; Sabine Hoffman
- Music by: Dascha Dauenhauer
- Production companies: Image Nation Studios; Team Thrives; Sight Unseen Pictures; New Native Pictures; Spooky Pictures
- Distributed by: Bleecker Street (United States)
- Release dates: 4 September 2026 (Telluride); 8 January 2027 (United States)
- Running time: 124 minutes
- Countries: United Kingdom; United States; New Zealand
- Language: English

The Liberation is a 2026 mystery drama film directed by Guy Nattiv, co-written with Noa Berman-Herzberg, and inspired by real events from the life of Nattiv's own grandmother. A co-production of the United Kingdom, United States, and New Zealand, it stars Carrie Coon as Rita Cooper, a Holocaust survivor who renounces her family to join the Harmonia commune cult.

The film premiered at the 53rd Telluride Film Festival on 4 September 2026, followed by a limited theatrical release on 6 November 2026, before going into wide theatrical release in the United States by Bleecker Street on 8 January 2027.

== Premise ==
The story is set in the 1980s. Inspired by a series of actual real events, the film is based on the experiences of director Guy Nattiv's own grandmother and her involvement in a cult. It follows Rita Cooper as she renounces her family to join the Harmonia commune, entranced by its leader. Rita's daughters, Ella and Jo, attempt to convince her to return home but find themselves drawn to the commune.

== Cast ==
- Carrie Coon as Rita Cooper
- Bella Ramsey as Ella Cooper
- Odessa Young as Jo Cooper
- Lily James as Ricki King
- Siobhan Williams as Shine
- Tracy Letts as Reuben
- Maia Michaels as Sheeva
- Sharon Taylor as Anya
- Nels Lennarson as Jeffrey
- John Cassini as Dr. Solomon

== Production ==
=== Development ===
Nattiv stated he wanted to shed light on the coercive power of cults through this film, a project he described as his "most personal film". He expressed his emotional connection to the narrative, referring to it as a story that has haunted his family since childhood. He mentioned that he had "been waiting decades until I was emotionally ready to confront my beloved grandmother's story, which has haunted my family since I was a child. As a woman in the 1980s going through a midlife crisis, my grandmother made the radical choice to leave my family and embed herself in an all-female cult, in an obsessive pursuit of happiness and meaning."

Jaime Ray Newman, Nattiv's wife, will co-produce the film through their production company, New Native Film. Joining them as producers are Julia Lebedev and Eric Viasman from Sight Unseen, and Oren Moverman. The screenplay was co-written by Nattiv and Noa Berman-Hertzberg, who also partnered with him on the 2010 film Mabul. This project continues Nattiv's collaboration with Bleecker Street, following their previous work together on 2023's Golda.

=== Casting ===
Naomi Watts was originally cast as Rita but the role was later recast with Carrie Coon. Vicky Krieps was originally cast as the Leader, but Lily James ultimately filled the role. Nattiv said the actors "each bring a deep, intuitive grace to these layered characters, and their commitment to tell my story is tremendously moving".

=== Filming ===
Principal photography began in British Columbia on July 14, 2025, and concluded on August 20, 2025. The film included sets in various locations in the area including Great Central Lake and McLean Mill National Historic Site. McLean Mill manager Elliot Drew said this was the third production to feature the mill within the past year and the movie crew consisted of more than 100 people, contributing more than $500,000 into the local economy.

=== Music ===
Dascha Dauenhauer was hired to compose the score.

== Release ==
It had its world premiere at the 53rd Telluride Film Festival on 4 September 2026. It also screened at the 2026 Toronto International Film Festival, the 2026 London Film Festival, and the Chicago Film Festival. In July 2026, Bleecker Street scheduled the film for a wide theatrical release in the United States on 8 January 2027 with a limited release on 6 November 2026.

== Reception ==
On the review aggregator website Rotten Tomatoes, 83% of 18 critics' reviews are positive, with an average rating of 6.4/10.
