= Kaleidoscope Dream =

Studio album by Miguel
- Released: September 25, 2012
- Studios: Gustavo's Golden Gloves Gymnasium (Los Angeles); MJP (Los Angeles); Platinum Sound (New York)
- Genres: Alternative R&B; contemporary R&B
- Length: 42:11
- Labels: Black Ice; ByStorm; RCA
- Producers: Fisticuffs; Happy Perez; Jerry Duplessis; Miguel; Oak Felder; Phatboiz; Pop Wansel; Salaam Remi

Miguel chronology
All I Want Is You (2010)	Kaleidoscope Dream (2012)	Wildheart (2015)

Singles from Kaleidoscope Dream
- 1. "Adorn" Released: August 7, 2012; 2. "Do You..." Released: September 18, 2012; 3. "How Many Drinks?" Released: March 3, 2013

Kaleidoscope Dream is the second studio album by American R&B singer-songwriter Miguel. It was released on September 25, 2012, by Black Ice Records, ByStorm Entertainment, and RCA Records. After the commercial breakthrough of his debut album All I Want Is You (2010), Miguel pursued a greater creative role on Kaleidoscope Dream as its principal writer and producer. He recorded most of the album at Platinum Sound Studios in New York City and MJP Studios in Los Angeles, working alongside producer-musicians Oak Felder, Jerry Duplessis, and Salaam Remi, among others.

With the album, Miguel wanted to explore the roots of R&B beyond the genre's contemporary trends and began playing guitar as a compositional source for his songs. With his studio personnel, he incorporated dense bass lines, buzzing synthesizers, and hazy, reverbed sounds into a musical style that draws on pop, funk, rock, soul, electronic, and psychedelic genres. Miguel titled Kaleidoscope Dream as both a metaphor for life and the creative freedom possible in dreams, while wanting to reflect his lifestyle and personality in the songs, which deal mostly with sex, romance, and existential ideas.

In marketing Kaleidoscope Dream, Miguel previewed the songs virally through a series of free EPs. The album was promoted further with three singles, including his biggest hit yet "Adorn", and his touring in North America and Europe from 2012 to 2013. Kaleidoscope Dream debuted at number three on the Billboard 200 with first-week sales of 71,000 copies, eventually selling 535,000 copies total by 2015. One of 2012's most critically successful releases, it was viewed by reviewers as an innovative and appealing R&B album, receiving praise for Miguel's singing and songwriting.

== Background ==
Miguel released his debut album All I Want Is You in November 2010 after it had been shelved by Jive Records for two years, It sold poorly at first and was underpromoted by Jive, amid the label's dissolution. As its singles received radio airplay and Miguel toured in its promotion, the album became a sleeper hit and helped him grow an audience and commercial exposure, along with his fervent concert performances. After Jive was shut down and absorbed by RCA Records, Miguel met a new marketing team to help present him as more than a typical urban contemporary artist, having felt pressure into being marketed as one by Jive. He said that the experience of balancing creativity and business sense on his first album made him more confident in his approach to Kaleidoscope Dream.

Miguel sought to rebrand himself artistically with the second album. Inspired by his more alternative musical influences, he wanted to change the sound and expectations of R&B songs on urban radio. The album's title, according to Miguel, is "a metaphor for our life; everyone has their own Kaleidoscope Dream, it is the life that they project and it is the life that they are solidifying with their conscious decision and their subconscious feelings." Miguel also said that the album represents how fantasies are conveyed through dreams, which he felt embody "the purest form of fantasy we unleash through our subconscious ... the truest freedom we can experience. Totally unrepressed and totally creative."

== Writing and recording ==
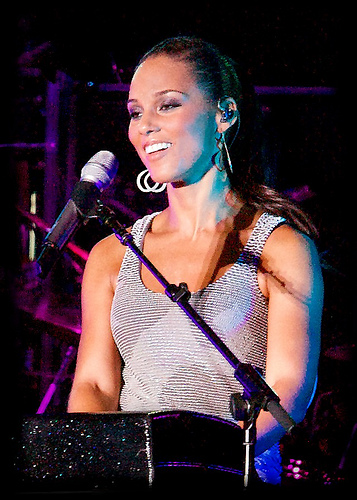
Alicia Keys (pictured in 2008) co-wrote and sang on "Where's the Fun in Forever".

Miguel worked on Kaleidoscope Dream for approximately three months. He sought to play a larger creative role than he had on All I Want Is You, with more involvement in the production and songwriting, writing or co-writing every song on the album. The album's writing also marked the beginning of Miguel's use of guitar as an instrument through which to compose songs.

Kaleidoscope Dream was recorded at Platinum Sound Studios in New York City and MJP Studios in Los Angeles; the songs "Arch & Point" and "Gravity" were recorded at Gustavo's Golden Gloves Gymnasium in Los Angeles. Miguel spent almost two years in New York City, which he felt let him explore "the edgy side" of his life and consequently made his sonic approach grittier, saying in an interview for The Village Voice: "I'm not the 'go to the club and pop bottles' kind of guy. That's not my lifestyle. I really like to party, but it's ... just darker. I'm looking for the speakeasy on the Lower East Side that has a secret door and a password." Miguel recorded "Adorn" in 2011 in the bedroom of his Los Angeles apartment, which he used as a makeshift studio at the time. Parts of the album were edited by Miguel and his engineers using Pro Tools.

Miguel wanted the album to be "a pure and honest projection of my lifestyle and my kaleidoscope dream", and used the music's pace and sound to represent his lifestyle and the lyrics to represent his personality. To sustain his creative approach, Miguel avoided media outlets that he usually visited for music, including radio and Internet blogs. He drew on musical influences from early in his life, including classic rock, country rock and funk. An orchestra was enlisted and string arrangements incorporated in the music, along with a drum loop, to the album's title track, which he felt aurally defined the moods of his personality. Miguel also worked with previous collaborators Salaam Remi and Happy Perez, among other producers. Singer-songwriter Alicia Keys co-wrote and sang background vocals on the song "Where's the Fun in Forever"; singer-songwriter Elle Varner co-wrote "Use Me"; and Brook D'Leau of J*Davey played keyboards on "Candles in the Sun".

Apart from sexual themes, Miguel wrote about conversational and existential topics. When writing "Pussy Is Mine", he drew on his sexual behavior as a single man and "moments of power and vulnerability" with a sexually promiscuous woman. Miguel originally co-wrote "Where's the Fun in Forever" with Alicia Keys in Jamaica, a collaboration for her project. Miguel deemed the notion of the song "such a personal thought and perspective", and felt very attached to it when the song was completed. Keys ultimately did not use the collaboration for her project, which Miguel was happy about, explaining to SoulCulture that "[Keys] was gracious enough to let us keep it and it's one of my favourite songs on the album". He wrote the album's title track in reaction to Jive's request for more conventional urban songs, with unusual lyrics that lacked a hook, chorus, or form.

== Music and lyrics ==
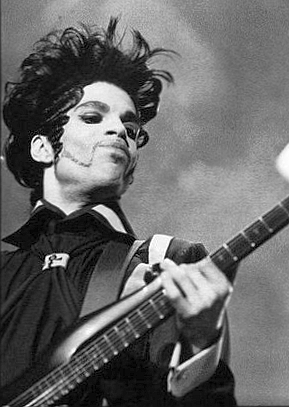
The rock-influenced music of Prince (c. late 1980s) is cited by writers in comparison to Kaleidoscope Dream.

According to The Independent's Holly Rubenstein, Kaleidoscope Dream is "widely considered a leading example" of alternative R&B; Miguel himself described it as "avant soul". In the opinion of NPR's Frannie Kelley, the record combined R&B, pop, funk, rock and soul genres. Its music features sparse production, eccentric details, thick basslines, buzzing synthesizers, and hazy, reverbed sounds. AllMusic's Andy Kellman found the album "funkier and weirder" than All I Want Is You and observed an "illusory atmosphere ... intensified by some unexpected touches". Maura Johnston said much of it "sounds, as the title might suggest, fractal."

As an R&B album, The A.V. Club's Evan Rytlewski said, Kaleidoscope Dream deviated from genre conventions by minimizing the influence of hip-hop; Jim DeRogatis believed it notably draws "on elements of great psychedelic rock and pop to color [the album's] soul and R&B". Austin Trunick of Under the Radar compared the album's "often-hypersexual subject matter" and "unusual production" to Prince, while Rytlewski said Miguel evokes the musician's "pop instincts" and "loud, funk rock guitars". Alex Macpherson of The Guardian perceived a "headier aesthetic" than on All I Want Is You, with "faded psychedelia" and "intimate experiments in Purple Rain-esque rock". Writing about the record for WNYC, Gretta Cohn claimed Miguel was "redefining what contemporary R&B can be". Mark Edward Nero of About.com considered the album "eclectic, artsy R&B-pop". Miguel said he "definitely think[s] it's an R&B record, though other people may not ... [Listeners] are so conditioned to expect certain things out of current R&B, and it's about following a formula. But R&B was once live music, it was psychedelic, it was rock, it was funk, and all these genres stem from soul music ... There would be no hip-hop or rock without R&B. It was important for me to be true to what R&B is, and that is soulful."

The album's lyrics generally deal with themes of adult love, meaningful sex, and romance. Andrew Ryce from Pitchfork interprets its "overarching theme" to be "the highly sexualized seen through the lens of the eager and innocent." Miguel's lyrics express modesty, yearning, vulnerability, and cheeky humor, with Kelley likening his songwriting to Tony! Toni! Toné! while also observing "Little Richard-level insinuations" and "absurd provocations in the style of Akinyele". DeRogatis views that Miguel avoids braggadocio and is "man enough to admit his own insecurities and question whether he's worthy of love—or lustful indulgence." The album explores the anxiety and momentary nature of sex and clubbing. Consequence's Jeremy D. Larson views that Miguel employs a "fangs-out approach to R&B" similar to Frank Ocean and The Weeknd, writing that "nothing shrouds Miguel and his directives, and worries, and prayers, and cat calls – it's all there, full of light and love, refracting through a kaleidoscope of rocks glasses, rainy windshields, and blood-shot eyes." NPR's Frannie Kelley said the album is "made up of love songs, but they are more specifically songs arguing for love, acting casual, wishing and hoping and then imagining what it would be like to consummate ... It's soul-baring, but mirrored and fairly guarded."

"Use Me"
A ballad about sexual vulnerability, "Use Me" features shoegaze guitars, oscillating beats, and echo-laden pleas to a lover.

"Adorn" has both digital and analog sensibilities, with lyrics featuring brazen declarations of affection, and promises of adoration to a female subject. "Don't Look Back" features amplified bass, bombastic drums, and metallic synths. Rob Markman of MTV News writes that the song "represents the morning after when the reality of the previous night's efforts creep in." Its closing interlude has Miguel crooning lyrics from The Zombies' 1969 song "Time of the Season" over sentimental synths and musky, psychedelic music. "Use Me" features hollow, electronic sounds, heavily multitracked vocals, metronomic rhythms, and an industrialized mix of guitar and percussion. Its lyrics blur expressions of sexual nerves with gentle dominance, as the narrator instructs his lover how she can toy with him. An atmospheric pop rock song, "Do You..." portrays a narcotic tryst and mixes amiable come-ons with drug imagery. The psychedelic title track incorporates synthesizer arpeggios, minor chords, oscillating blips, fuzzy guitar, and a bassline interpolation of Labi Siffre's 1975 song "I Got The". The sample's groove is played at a different tempo than other instruments on the song. The song's lyrics feature synesthetic imagery ("I taste you, infinite colors"), and a boast by the narrator about kissing his subject's third eye.

"The Thrill" has a sparse bass groove, layered keyboards, and existential lyrics with YOLO imagery. "How Many Drinks?" has sardonic, swaggering lyrics and a rap verse by Miguel, who veers between seducer and user. "Where's the Fun in Forever" features atmospheric drums and bass, an a cappella bridge, and rolling dynamics with measures that advance an argument. The song celebrates youthful bliss and preaches a carpe diem philosophy. It transitions into the rock song "Arch & Point", which has sexually charged ballet metaphors and bare power pop elements. "Pussy Is Mine" features a high vocal range by Miguel, a rudimentary chord progression played on electric guitar, and a stripped, demo quality. The song is about sexual jealousy and an ignoble man's plea for exclusivity in a casual relationship. Its sexually explicit, bawdy lyrics eschew masculine hip-hop tropes for feelings of insecurity. The song is bookended by background studio chatter. "Candles in the Sun" is a slow burning, political soul song. It touches on senseless killings, drug-infested communities, and questions the existence of God and the motives of governments. Chris Kelly of Fact writes that, along with "Adorn", "Candles in the Sun" "bookend[s] the album with another tribute to Marvin Gaye, a la 'What's Going On?'"

== Marketing and sales ==
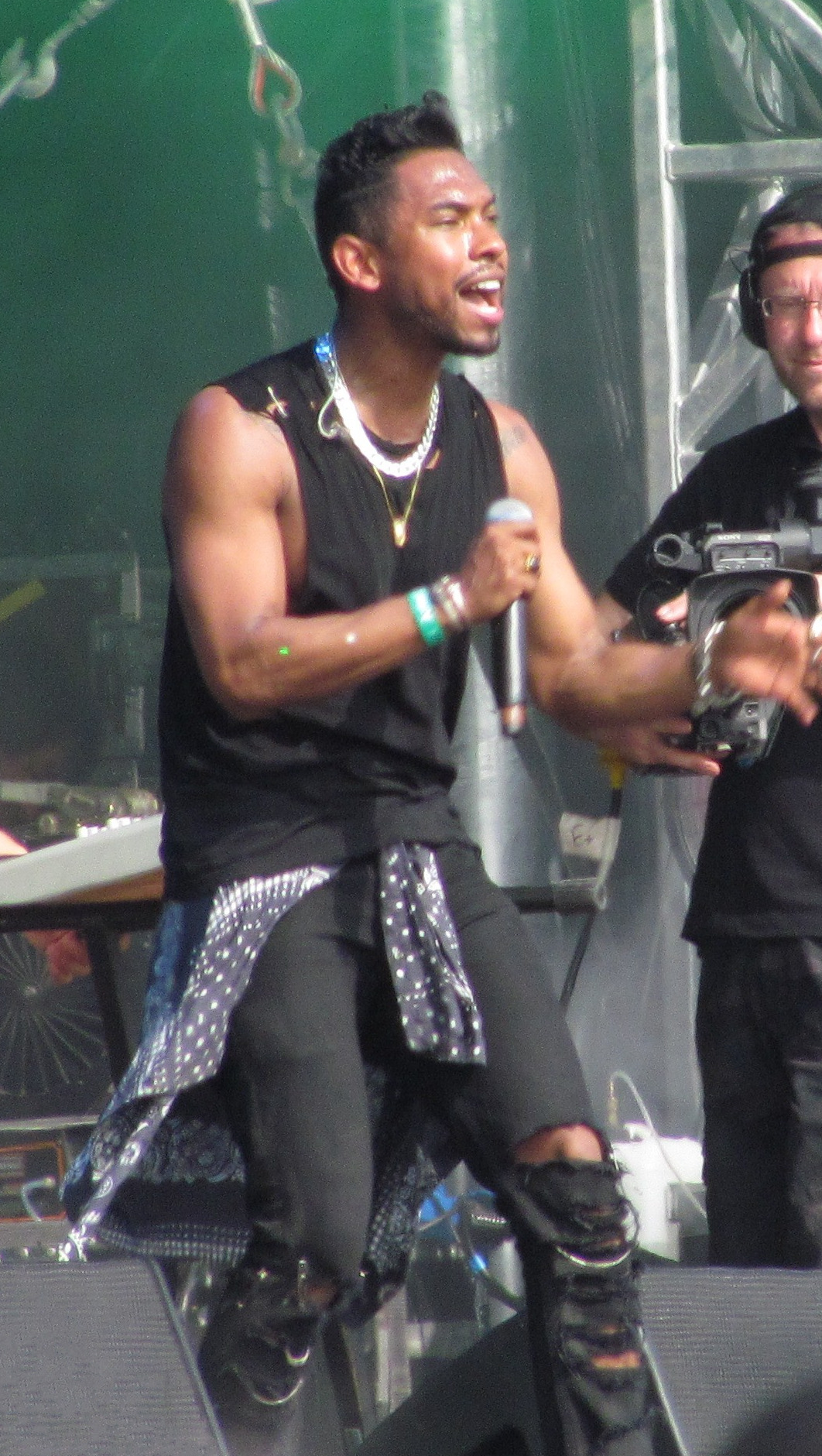
Miguel performing in 2013

After pitching the strategy to RCA, Miguel first marketed Kaleidoscope Dream virally with a three-volume series of EPs entitled Art Dealer Chic, which were released as free downloads during February to April 2012 and previewed songs from the album. He released two more EPs—Kaleidoscope Dream: Water Preview on July 31 and Air Preview on September 11— to digital retailers. In an interview for The Village Voice, Miguel said that the strategy allowed listeners to absorb the songs at his desired pace and called it "a great way for me to reconnect with my peers ... the people that I hang out with—that go to the same shows, listen to the same music, read the same blogs, same magazines."

"Adorn" was released as Kaleidoscope Dream's lead single on August 7, becoming a sleeper hit on urban radio. It was Miguel's second number-one single on the Hot R&B/Hip-Hop Songs, and his highest charting single on the Billboard Hot 100 at number 17. By September, the single had sold 190,000 copies. According to NPR's Audie Cornish, Miguel "broke through to a national audience in 2012" with both "Adorn" and Kaleidoscope Dream. The second single "Do You..." was released on September 18, and reached number 32 on the Hot R&B/Hip-Hop Songs. The album's third and final single, "How Many Drinks?", was released on March 3, 2013.

Kaleidoscope Dream was first released in vinyl LP format on September 25, 2012, in an effort by RCA to make the deadline for the Grammy Awards' eligibility period without charting prematurely on lower sales. The following week, it debuted at number three on the Billboard 200, selling 71,000 copies in the US. It was Miguel's first album to be released in the United Kingdom, where it spent 15 weeks on the country's R&B chart, peaking at number 13. By February 20, 2013, the record had charted for 20 weeks on the Billboard 200 and sold 321,000 copies, according to Nielsen SoundScan. By June 2015, the album had sold 535,000 copies in the US. It was certified platinum by the Recording Industry Association of America (RIAA) in November 2017.

In further support of Kaleidoscope Dream, Miguel embarked on a short promotional tour in the US on September 26, 2012. He also promoted the record with television performances on 106 & Park, The Wendy Williams Show, Late Show with David Letterman, and Jimmy Kimmel Live!. He subsequently toured in support of the album for six months throughout North America and Europe, including concert dates as a supporting act on Trey Songz' Chapter V World Tour during November 2012 to February 2013, a headlining tour in the UK and Ireland during January 2013, and an opening slot on Alicia Keys' Set the World on Fire Tour in March and April. While on tour, Miguel did not choreograph his shows but routinely rehearsed in a dance studio and practiced singing in front of a mirror. In concert, he performed dramatic leaps, staggers, and other moves fashioned after Little Richard and James Brown. He started ripping his shirt off during performances after being inspired by Songz' concerts.

== Critical reception ==
Kaleidoscope Dream ratings
Aggregate scores
Source	Rating
AnyDecentMusic?	8.0/10
Metacritic	86/100
Review scores
Source	Rating
AllMusic	5/5 stars
Chicago Tribune	3.5/4 stars
The Guardian	4/5 stars
The Irish Times	4/5 stars
MSN Music (Expert Witness)	A−
Pitchfork	8.4/10
Q	4/5 stars
Rolling Stone	3.5/5 stars
Spin	9/10
USA Today	3/4 stars

Kaleidoscope Dream was met with widespread critical acclaim. At Metacritic, which assigns a normalized rating out of 100 to reviews from professional publications, the album received an average score of 86, based on 20 reviews. Aggregator AnyDecentMusic? gave it 8.0 out of 10, based on their assessment of the critical consensus.

Reviewing the album for AllMusic, Andy Kellman hailed it as "2012's most pleasurable pop-R&B album". In the Chicago Tribune, Greg Kot said Miguel "creates a fluid, dreamscape environment that floats across eras with a connoisseur's discerning feel for the telling detail." Macpherson wrote in The Guardian of Miguel's occasional "appeal to indie tropes" balanced by "genuinely thoughtful songwriting", while admiring his use of a commercial breakthrough "as a springboard to radically change course". Sean McCarthy from PopMatters wrote that, along with Frank Ocean's Channel Orange, it showed R&B as the innovative genre in mainstream music during 2012, while Los Angeles Times critic Randall Roberts said it "offers further evidence of a genre being reborn in 2012." Pitchfork's Andrew Ryce hailed Miguel as "the rare vocalist who makes you feel what he's singing about, even when his lyrics can be transparent." Alfred Soto of The Quietus appreciated Miguel's ability to "articulate how a love man can be louche without being a douche." Ken Capobianco from The Boston Globe was more critical, finding some of the songs overworked and Miguel "too remote for a true soul singer". New York Times critic Jon Caramanica said Kaleidoscope Dream sounds inconsistent and "a little washed-out, a blend of Prince-isms and slurry grooves", while Kellman complained of the lyrics occasionally veering "too close to 'artsy' teenage erotic poetry".

At the end of 2012, Kaleidoscope Dream appeared on several critics' lists of the year's best records. Ann Powers named it the best album of 2012. It was also ranked number 26 by Robert Christgau, number eleven by The Guardian, number 10 by the Chicago Tribune, number eight by Slate, number six by the Los Angeles Times, number five by AllMusic, Okayplayer, and Spin, number four by Entertainment Weekly, number three by Billboard, New York, and Now, and number one by Idolator. Metacritic named it the 12th best-reviewed album of 2012. The album was voted the fifth best album of 2012 in the Pazz & Jop, an annual poll of American critics nationwide, published by The Village Voice. Kaleidoscope Dream was nominated for the 2013 Grammy Award for Best Urban Contemporary Album, while "Adorn" was nominated for Best R&B Performance and Song of the Year, winning in the Best R&B Song category. In 2014, Pitchfork ranked the album at number 59 in their list of "The 100 Best Albums of the Decade So Far (2010–2014)".

== Track listing ==
Kaleidoscope Dream standard edition
No.	Title	Writer(s)	Producer(s)	Length
1.	"Adorn"	Miguel Pimentel	Miguel	3:13
2.	"Don't Look Back"	Pimentel; Nathan Perez	Happy Perez; Miguel	4:26
3.	"Use Me"	Pimentel; Warren Felder; Andrew Wansel; Steve Mostyn; Elle Varner; Ronnie James; Nycole Russell	Pop Wansel; Oak Felder; Ace^{[a]}; Miguel^{[a]}	4:40
4.	"Do You..."	Pimentel; Jerry Duplessis; Arden Altino; Paul Pesco	Duplessis; Keyz^{[a]}; Miguel^{[a]}	3:28
5.	"Kaleidoscope Dream"	Pimentel; Salaam Remi; Labi Siffre	Remi; Miguel^{[a]}	4:17
6.	"The Thrill"	Pimentel; Allen Arthur; Clayton Reilly; Keith Justice	Miguel; Phatboiz	3:04
7.	"How Many Drinks?"	Pimentel; Remi; Roger Nichols; Paul Williams	Remi	4:32
8.	"Where's the Fun in Forever"	Pimentel; Alicia Keys; Felder; Wansel; Mostyn	Pop Wansel; Oak Felder; Ace^{[a]}	3:29
9.	"Arch & Point"	Pimentel; Mac Robinson; Brian Warfield	Fisticuffs	3:17
10.	"Pussy Is Mine"	Pimentel	Miguel	2:53
11.	"Candles in the Sun"	Pimentel	Miguel	4:55
Total length:				42:11

iTunes bonus track
No.	Title	Writer(s)	Producer(s)	Length
12.	"Adorn" (Remix) (featuring Wiz Khalifa)	Pimentel; Cameron Thomaz	Miguel	3:47

UK bonus tracks
No.	Title	Writer(s)	Producer(s)	Length
12.	"Gravity"	Pimentel; Robinson; Warfield	Miguel; Fisticuffs	3:39
13.	"...All"	Pimentel	Miguel	3:59
14.	"Adorn" (Remix) (featuring Wiz Khalifa)	Pimentel; Cameron Thomaz	Miguel	3:47

International bonus tracks
No.	Title	Writer(s)	Producer(s)	Length
15.	"How Many Drinks?" (Remix) (featuring Kendrick Lamar)	Pimentel; Remi; Nichols; Williams; Kendrick Duckworth	Remi	4:30

Notes

- ^{^[a]} signifies a co-producer
- "Don't Look Back" contains a portion of "Time of the Season", written by Rod Argent and performed by The Zombies.
- "Kaleidoscope Dream" contains a sample from "I Got The... ", written and performed by Labi Siffre.
- "How Many Drinks?" contains a sample from the O'Donel Levy instrumental cover of "We've Only Just Begun", written by Roger Nichols and Paul Williams and originally performed by The Carpenters.

== Personnel ==
Information is taken from the album credits.

- Arden "Keyz" Altino – producer
- Wayne Barrow – executive producer
- Tanisha Broadwater – production coordination
- Tyler Bunting – engineer
- Darius Campo – violin
- Roberto Cani – violin
- Rich Costey – mixing
- Tom Coyne – mastering
- Tim Davies – string arrangements
- Dru DeCaro – guitar
- Brian Dembrow – viola
- Gleyder "Gee" Disla – engineer
- Brook D'Leau – keyboards
- Bruce Dukov – violin
- Jerry "Wonda" Duplessis – producer
- Steve Erdody – celli
- Eun-Mee Anh – violin
- Oak Felder – producer
- Fisticuffs – musician, producer
- Erwin Gorostiza – creative director
- Jessica E. Guideri – violin
- Tamara Hatwan – violin
- Paula Hochhalter – celli
- Eric Isip – assistant engineer
- Chris Kasych – Pro Tools
- Ronald Kelly – drums
- Alicia Keys – background vocals
- Phillip Levy – violin
- Kim Lumpkin – production coordination
- Shawn Mann – viola
- Manny Marroquin – mixing
- Donnie Meadows – production coordination
- Michel Michelakis – drum programming
- Miguel – art direction, background vocals, creative director, design, drums, engineer, executive producer, primary artist, Pro Tools, producer
- Victoria Miskolczy – viola
- Alyssa Park – violin
- Sarah Parkins – violin
- Happy Perez – producer
- Paul Pesco – guitar
- Phatboiz – producer
- Mark Pitts – executive producer
- Christian Plata – mixing
- Lance Powell – engineer, Pro Tools
- Salaam Remi – bass, drums, guitar, keyboards, producer
- Rafael Rishik – violin
- Timothy Saccenti – photography
- George Kim Scholes – celli
- Jayme David Silverstein – bass
- Lisa M. Sutton – violin
- Sarah Thornblade – violin
- Sergio "Sergical" Tsai – engineer
- Cecelia Tsan – celli
- Jo Ann Turovsky – harp
- Courtney Walker – art direction, design
- David F. Walther – viola
- Pop Wansel – producer
- Brian Warfield – Pro Tools

== Charts ==
=== Weekly charts ===
2012 chart performance for Kaleidoscope Dream
Chart (2012)	Peak position
UK Album Downloads (Official Charts)	52
UK R&B Albums (Official Charts)	13
US Billboard 200	3
US Top R&B/Hip-Hop Albums (Billboard)	1

2013 chart performance for Kaleidoscope Dream
Chart (2013)	Peak position
Australian Albums (ARIA)	45
Danish Albums (Hitlisten)	26

=== Year-end charts ===
2012 year-end chart performance for Kaleidoscope Dream
Chart (2012)	Position
US Billboard 200	161
US Top R&B/Hip-Hop Albums (Billboard)	38

2013 year-end chart performance for Kaleidoscope Dream
Chart (2013)	Position
US Billboard 200	89
US Top R&B/Hip-Hop Albums (Billboard)	20

== Certifications ==
Certifications for Kaleidoscope Dream
Region	Certification	Certified units/sales
Denmark (IFPI Danmark)	Gold	10,000^{‡}
New Zealand (RMNZ)	Platinum	15,000^{‡}
United Kingdom (BPI)	Silver	60,000^{‡}
United States (RIAA)	Platinum	1,000,000^{‡}
^{‡} Sales+streaming figures based on certification alone.

== Release history ==
Release dates and formats for Kaleidoscope Dream
Region	Date	Label(s)	Format(s)	Ref.
United States	September 25, 2012	RCA	LP	
United Kingdom	October 1, 2012	ByStorm; RCA	Digital download	
Canada	October 2, 2012	ByStorm; RCA	Digital download; CD	
United States	October 2, 2012	ByStorm; RCA	Digital download; CD	
United Kingdom	November 12, 2012	Sony Music	CD	
Australia	November 16, 2012	Sony Music	CD	
Denmark	December 17, 2012	Sony Music	CD	
Austria	May 31, 2013	Sony Music	Digital download; CD	
Germany	May 31, 2013	Sony Music	Digital download; CD	
Switzerland	May 31, 2013	Sony Music	Digital download; CD	

== See also ==
- iTunes LP
- List of Billboard number-one R&B albums of 2012
- Progressive soul
