= Wild Summon =

2023 short film

- Directed by: Karni Arieli; Saul Freed
- Produced by: Karni Arieli; Saul Freed; Jay Woolley
- Starring: Marianne Faithfull
- Music by: Saul Freed; Peter Vilk; Roxana Vilk
- Production companies: Sulkybunny; Hyperobject Industries; New Native Pictures
- Distributed by: Autour de Minuit
- Release date: 2023
- Running time: 14 minutes
- Country: United Kingdom

Wild Summon is a 2023 eco fantasy animated short film directed by the filmmaking duo Karni Arieli and Saul Freed, also known as 'Karni & Saul', and narrated by British singer Marianne Faithfull in her final film role before her death in 2025. The 14-minute film depicts the life of a female salmon in the human form of a free diver. Wild Summon premiered at the 2023 Cannes Film Festival, where it was nominated for the Palme d'Or for Best Short Film. It has been featured in a number of international film festivals, including the Annecy International Animation Film Festival and the Raindance Film Festival, where it won an award for Best Short Film. In January 2024, filmmakers Adam McKay, Kevin Messick, Guy Nattiv and Jaime Ray Newman came aboard as executive producers of the film.

On December 21, 2023, the film was shortlisted for the 96th Academy Awards in the category of Best Animated Short Film but ultimately was not nominated.

The short film can be watched on the directors' official Vimeo channel.

== Summary ==
Having laid her eggs in the river, a mother salmon has died. Weeks later in the water, one of the salmon's offspring, a female, hatches out and begins her life, keeping herself safe among the pebbles.

When the seasons change, the salmon and her school migrate out to sea. Along the way, the salmon gets tagged before being released back into the wild. After swimming for months, the salmon arrives in the sea where she will grow bigger and stronger for the migration back home.

After living in the sea for a few years, the now adult salmon has mated and she and her school migrate back to the river where they were born. As she reaches the spawning ground, the salmon has survived several obstacles: predators which devour most of her school, water pollution, overfishing, and disease affecting farmed salmon.

Upon successfully coming home, the salmon lays her eggs and dies. In the water, the salmon's eggs develop, continuing the cycle of life and death.

== Production ==
The film received funding from the British Film Institute and was made with a combination of live footage and 3D computer animation over the course of two years. The live footage was shot in Iceland during the pandemic, and the computer animation, produced by the Bristol-based Sulkybunny Studio, was made primarily with the Autodesk Maya, Arnold and SythnEyes software, and the compositing was done using Adobe After Effects.

== Reception ==
Since its release, the film has been selected in various festivals around the world:

Year	Festivals	Award/Category	Status	Ref.
2023	Cannes International Film Festival	Palme d'Or for Best Short Film	Nominated	
2023	Annecy International Animated Film Festival	Cristal for Best Short Film	Nominated	
2023	Stockholm Film Festival	Bronze Horse for Best Short Film	Nominated	
2023	Raindance Film Festival	Best Short Film	Won	
2023	Hamptons International Film Festival	Golden Starfish Award for Best Documentary Short	Nominated	
2023	Fantasy Filmfest	Get Shorty Award (Audience Award)	Won	
2023	Blue Danube Film Festival	Best Animated Film	Nominated	
2023	Animation Is Film Festival	Special Jury Prize for Best Short Film	Won	
2023	Healdsburg Film Festival	Grand Jury Prize	Won	
