= Arienne Mandi =

American actress (born 1994)

- Born: April 8, 1994 (age 32); Los Angeles, California, U.S.
- Occupation: Actress
- Years active: 2014–present
- Relatives: Nazanin Mandi (cousin)

Arienne Mandi is an American actress known for playing the lead character Dani Núñez in The L Word: Generation Q,, and Officer Eva Imani in the TV series Chicago P.D. on NBC. She also played Francesca "Franki" Murray in the 2022 film Love, Classified and Noor Taheri in the second season of The Night Agent.

== Career ==
Mandi appeared in the shows, NCIS, Hawaii Five-0, The Interns, NCIS: Los Angeles, and In the Vault. She played the lead in the film Baja. She subsequently went on to play a major character Daniela "Dani" Núñez in The L Word: Generation Q and was widely loved by fans. She also starred in the film Love, Classified as Francesca "Franki" Murray. She played the lead character of Iranian judoka Leila Hosseini in the political-thriller Tatami, alongside Zar Amir Ebrahimi, co-directed by an Academy Award–winning director Guy Nattiv and Ebrahimi. It had its world premiere at the 80th Venice International Film Festival on September 2, 2023. In 2026, she appeared in the audiobook Speak Now by Ash Perez.

In 2025 she had a lead role in season two of the Netflix series The Night Agent, playing Noor Taheri, an employee at the Iranian Mission in New York City who seeks asylum in the U.S.

In 2025 she also became a series regular in the TV series Chicago P.D. on NBC, cast as Officer Eva Imani.

== Personal life ==
Mandi was born in Los Angeles on April 8, 1994. She is Chilean on her mother's side and Iranian on her father's side. Mandi is fluent in Spanish, French, Persian and English. She made the following statement in regards to her sexuality: "If there were to be anything close to what I feel it would be pan. I accept love in all forms and I give love. It's just all love." In an episode of the podcast Scissoring Isn't a Thing, Mandi confirmed that Nazanin Mandi is her cousin.

== Filmography ==
Film
Year	Title	Role	Notes
2015	Between the Lines	Madeline	Short film
2017	Escape Artist	Arienne	
2018	Baja	Lisa Bolanos / Lorena De Los Rios	
2020	Break Even	Maddy	
2022	Love, Classified	Francesca "Franki" Murray	Television film (Hallmark channel)
2022	Arienne Mandi: Why I Fight	Herself	Short film
2023	Tatami	Leila Hosseini	
TBA	Hostage	Angela Robinson	

Television
Year	Title	Role	Notes
2015	NCIS: Los Angeles	Catalina Diaz	Guest
2015	Agent X	Afshan	Guest
2018	NCIS	Emma Sweeney	Guest
2018	Hawaii Five-0	Carlotta	Guest
2019–2023	The L Word: Generation Q	Daniela "Dani" Núñez	Series regular; 3 seasons
2022	In the Vault	Valentina Velez	Season 2 (8 episodes)
2025	The Night Agent	Noor Taheri	Main role; Season 2
2025	FBI	Anna Fox	Guest
2025–present	Chicago P.D.	Officer Eva Imani	Series regular (season 13)
2026–present	Your Friends & Neighbors	Brienne Zalkin	Recurring role; season 2
