= Strangers (2007 Israeli film) =

Strangers (Zarim)
- Film poster
- Directed by: Guy Nattiv, Erez Tadmor
- Written by: Guy Nattiv, Erez Tadmor (synopsis only)
- Produced by: Tami Leon, Chilik Michaeli, Shai Michaeli, Avraham Pirchi
- Starring: Lubna Azabal and Liron Levo
- Edited by: Yuval Or
- Music by: Eyal Leon Katzav (original music)
- Distributed by: IFC Films
- Release dates: June 8, 2007 (Jerusalem Film Festival); May 29, 2008 (Israel - wide release); October 18, 2011 (DVD-U.S.)
- Running time: 85 minutes
- Country: Israel
- Languages: Arabic, English, French, Hebrew
- Budget: $200,000 (estimated)

Strangers (Zarim) is a 2007 Israeli experimental fictional film directed by Guy Nattiv and Erez Tadmor that is set during the 2006 FIFA World Cup and the 2006 Lebanon War. It is the first feature film that they made together and was developed from an award-winning 2004 short of the same name.

== Plot summary ==
Strangers opens in Berlin during the 2006 FIFA World Cup. Rana Sweid (Lubna Azabal), a Palestinian from Ramallah currently living in Paris, meets Eyal Goldman (Liron Levo), an Israeli who grew up on a kibbutz, after they accidentally switch bags on a train. They eventually strike up a friendship and decide to watch the World Cup together. Their budding romance is cut short when Rana is mysteriously called back to France and asks Eyal to stop seeing her. Despite her request, he seeks her in France. They are then faced with the 2006 Lebanon War as Eyal is drafted by the Israel Defense Forces.

== Cast ==
- Lubna Azabal - Rana Sweid
- Liron Levo - Eyal Goldman
- Abdallah El Akal - Rashid Sweid
- Patrick Albenque - Semi Jan
- Mila Dekker - Simon
- Dominique Lollia - Samira Shalach

== Production ==
In 2004, directors Erez Tadmor and Guy Nattiv submitted a short called Strangers to the Sundance Film Festival. It won the Online Film Festival Audience Award which led to funding a full-length version of the film.

They envisioned the feature version as experimental in form, largely improvised and centered around the World Cup in Berlin. Production began in Berlin with one actor (Levo), photographer and producer. They then met with actress Lubna Azabal whom they convinced to join the production via phone by telling her: "two actors, one camera and the World Cup Soccer Championships. That's all. No screenplay, only a synopsis, and we want to flow with it." According to the directors, they wanted "the actors to improvise their lines without being bound by an official screenplay, and to let the relationship that would develop between the characteristics dictate the flow of the plot."

The war broke out two weeks into the Berlin shoot, prompting production to shut down. Tadmor noted that, "We immediately made the decision to stop shooting and return home to be with our families. When we continued shooting later in Paris, it was a different movie." The basic premise of the film, a love story, was thus further complicated by the introduction of the war when filming resumed: " 'We didn't want to do a war movie or a political movie, but it's there in the background, on the TV and radios - it's all over the place. The characters really continued their relationship while the war was all around them. We tried to avoid the clichés of the Arab-Israeli conflict, but you saw how these two characters dealt with it,' said Tadmor."

== Release ==
After an initial showing at the Jerusalem Film Festival on June 8, 2007, Strangers was released nationwide in Israel on May 29, 2008. It was one of two films shown at the 2008 Sundance Film Festival on the 2006 Lebanon War. The other was Philippe Aractingi's Under the Bombs. IFC Films bought the U.S. rights to Strangers in 2008 after it was screened at Sundance and the Tribeca Film Festival. The DVD was released by Zeitgeist Films on October 18, 2011.

== Reception ==
=== Critical response ===
John Anderson of Variety praised the acting as a key factor in making the film a "winner" with "first-rate" production values. Emily Wilson of KQED states that: "Exploring whether love can overcome political and social barriers is a familiar premise, but Strangers covers the territory in a fresh way. The actors, working mostly without a script, improvised their dialogue, which makes the characters feel less like pawns the filmmakers are moving around to make a point."

=== Accolades ===
Strangers was an Official Selection at the 2008 Sundance Film Festival, the 2008 Tribeca Film Festival, and the 2008 São Paulo International Film Festival.

- Winner: 2007 Jerusalem Film Festival - Most Promising Actress- Lubna Azabal
- Nominated: 2008 Sundance Film Festival - Grand Jury Prize, World Cinema-Dramatic
- Nominated: 2008 Ophir Award - Best Actor, Liron Levo
- Nominated: 2008 São Paulo International Film Festival - International Jury Award

== See also ==
- Cup Final (film)
- Under the Bombs
