= How Many Drinks? =

Single by Miguel featuring Kendrick Lamar

from the album Kaleidoscope Dream
- Released: March 3, 2013
- Recorded: 2012
- Length: 4:30
- Label: RCA
- Songwriters: Miguel Pimentel; Kendrick Lamar Duckworth; Roger Nichols; Salaam Remi; Paul Williams
- Producer: Salaam Remi

Miguel singles chronology
"Power Trip" (2013)	"How Many Drinks?" (2013)	"#Beautiful" (2013)

Kendrick Lamar singles chronology
"YOLO" (2013)	"How Many Drinks?" (2013)	"Bitch, Don't Kill My Vibe" (2013)

Music video
- "How Many Drinks?" on YouTube

"How Many Drinks?" is a song by American recording artist Miguel, taken from his critically acclaimed second studio album, Kaleidoscope Dream. The song was produced by Salaam Remi. A remixed single featuring Kendrick Lamar on an added third verse was released as the album's third single on March 3, 2013. It received a nomination for Best R&B Performance at the 56th Grammy Awards held in January 2014. The chorus melody samples the O'Donel Levy instrumental cover of The Carpenters song We've Only Just Begun.

== Music video ==
The music video, directed by Clark Jackson, was released on April 22, 2013 on VEVO.

== Chart performance ==
The song debuted at 88 on the Billboard Hot 100 on week ending May 4, 2013. It has since peaked at #69 on the week of July 20, 2013, and spent a total of 20 weeks on the chart.

Chart (2013–14)	Peak position
US Billboard Hot 100	69
US Hot R&B/Hip-Hop Songs (Billboard)	24
US R&B/Hip-Hop Airplay (Billboard)	3
US Adult R&B Songs (Billboard)	19
US Rhythmic Airplay (Billboard)	31

== Certifications ==
Region	Certification	Certified units/sales
Australia (ARIA)	Gold	35,000^{‡}
New Zealand (RMNZ)	2× Platinum	60,000^{‡}
United Kingdom (BPI)	Silver	200,000^{‡}
United States (RIAA)	Platinum	1,000,000^{‡}
^{‡} Sales+streaming figures based on certification alone.
