= Baja (film) =

- Film poster
- Directed by: Tony Vidal
- Written by: Tony Vidal
- Produced by: R. Ellis Frazier; Justin Nesbitt; Tony Vidal; Gregory Wilker
- Starring: Jake Thomas; Chris Brochu; Michelle DeShon; Arienne Mandi; Zoe Corraface
- Cinematography: Jorge Roman
- Edited by: Robin Lee
- Music by: Greg Landau
- Production companies: Prankster Entertainment; Badhouse Studios Mexico
- Distributed by: Gravitas Ventures
- Release date: April 13, 2018 (United States)
- Running time: 106 minutes
- Country: United States
- Language: English

Baja is a 2018 American comedy film directed and written by Tony Vidal, and starring Jake Thomas, Chris Brochu, Michelle DeShon, Arienne Mandi and Zoe Corraface.

== Premise ==
During Christmas break, four 22 year-olds on a Mexican road trip seem bound for trouble until they, and their trip, are unexpectedly redeemed by a series of miraculous events.

== Cast ==
- Jake Thomas as Bryan Johnson
- Chris Brochu as Todd Meyer
- Michelle DeShon as Jessica Francis
- Arienne Mandi as Lisa Bolanos / Lorena De Los Rios
- Zoe Corraface as Carmen
- Mark Margolis as Don Primo
- Cynthia Stevenson as Josey Johnson
- Kurt Fuller as Hal Johnson
- José Zúñiga as Luis Bolanos
- Jason Spisak as Burnout
- Andres Londono as Jorge Ramirez
- Toktam Aboozary as Madam

== Production ==
Principal photography took place throughout Baja California Sur in Mexico, including Loreto, Rosarito Beach, Ensenada and Tijuana.

== Release ==
Baja was released in North America via limited release on April 13, 2018.

== Reception ==
The film received mixed reviews from critics. On review aggregator website Rotten Tomatoes, the film holds an approval rating of 43%, based on seven reviews, and an average rating of 4.5/10. Noel Murray of the Los Angeles Times called the film a "vacation for the mind." Conversely, David Lewis from the San Francisco Chronicle gave the film one out of four stars, noting its lack of inspiration.
