= Tatami (film) =

2023 film

- Theatrical release poster
- Directed by: Guy Nattiv; Zar Amir Ebrahimi
- Screenplay by: Elham Erfani; Guy Nattiv
- Produced by: Adi Ezroni; Mandy Tagger Brockey; Guy Nattiv; Ori Allon; Jaime Ray Newman
- Starring: Arienne Mandi; Zar Amir Ebrahimi
- Cinematography: Todd Martin
- Edited by: Yuval Orr
- Music by: Dascha Dauenhauer
- Production companies: New Native Pictures; Keshet Studios; WestEnd Films; White Lodge Productions; Maven Screen Media; Tale Runners; Sarke Studios
- Distributed by: XYZ Films
- Release dates: September 2, 2023 (Venice); June 13, 2025 (United States)
- Running time: 105 minutes
- Countries: United States; United Kingdom; Israel; Georgia
- Languages: Persian; English
- Box office: $2 million

Tatami is a 2023 sports drama thriller film directed by Guy Nattiv and Zar Amir Ebrahimi, from a screenplay by Nattiv and Elham Erfani. It stars Arienne Mandi, Ebrahimi, Jaime Ray Newman, Ash Goldeh and Sina Parvaneh.

It had its world premiere at the 80th Venice International Film Festival on September 2, 2023, receiving positive reviews from the critics and audience.

== Synopsis ==
The film follows Iranian female judoka Leila and her coach Maryam, who travel to the World Judo Championships in Tbilisi, Georgia, intent on bringing home Iran's first gold medal. This includes a possible encounter with an Israeli athlete, something that the Mullah regime prohibits. Midway through the competition, Leila and her coach receive repeated threats from the Islamic Republic ordering Leila to fake an injury and drop out of the tournament. With her own and her family's freedom at stake, Leila faces a difficult choice: feign injury and comply with the Iranian regime as Maryam implores her to do, or defy them both and fight on, for the gold.

Although Maryam urges Leila to feign an injury and withdraw, Leila remains determined to compete. This leads to an altercation between them, which officials of the World Judo Association notice. An exasperated Leila bangs her head against a bathroom mirror leading to a gash on her forehead. As Leila continues competing, the Iranian authorities begin retaliating against her family, attempting to arrest her husband and coercing her father into sending her a video message urging her to withdraw. World Judo Association officials interview Leila and confirm that she is being threatened, but Leila cannot think of anything they can do to help her. Leila eventually loses in a match with a Georgian judoka. Officials in the Iranian tournament delegation then attempt to force Maryam into a car and back to Iran, but Maryam runs away. Leila, her family, and Maryam obtain asylum in France.

== Cast ==
- Arienne Mandi as Leila Hosseini
- Zar Amir Ebrahimi as Maryam Ghanbari
- Jaime Ray Newman as Stacey Travisi
- Nadine Marshall as Jean Claire Abriel
- Lirr Katz as Shani Lavi
- Ash Goldeh as Nader Hosseini
- Sina Parvaneh as Azizi
- Valeriu Andriuță as Vlad
- Mehdi Bajestani as Amar Hossein
- Justina (Farima Habashizadehasl) as Herself
- Elham Erfani as Assistant coach

== Production ==
With Guy Nattiv and Zar Amir Ebrahimi as co-directors, the project marks the first feature film to be co-directed by an Iranian and an Israeli filmmaker. Tatami is produced for Keshet Studios by Adi Ezroni and Mandy Tagger Brockey, alongside Guy Nattiv and Jaime Ray Newman from New Native Pictures.

WestEnd Films acquired international rights in February 2023. Other production companies involved in the project include White Lodge Productions, Maven Pictures, Tale Runners and Sarke Studios.

=== Casting ===
In February 2023 the cast was revealed to include Arienne Mandi and Amir Ebrahimi in the lead roles, with appearances by Jaime Ray Newman, Nadine Marshall and Mehdi Bajestani.

=== Filming ===
In February 2023 the film was revealed by the Hollywood Reporter to be in post-production. First-look images from the film were released in May 2023.

== Release ==
It had its World premiere at the 80th Venice International Film Festival on September 2, 2023. and its Asian premiere at the 36th Tokyo International Film Festival on October 25, 2023. It was also screened in the 19th Zurich Film Festival on October 2, 2023. In February 2024, XYZ Films acquired US distribution rights to the film. The film was released in the United States on June 13, 2025.

== Awards ==
- Brian Award at the 80th Venice International Film Festival
- Special Jury Prize at the 36th Tokyo International Film Festival
- Best Actress for Zar Amir Ebrahimi at the 36th Tokyo International Film Festival

== Background and inspiration ==
Tatami is a fictional story inspired by documented incidents in which Iranian athletes were pressured by authorities to avoid competing against Israeli opponents. Iran has long enforced a policy of boycotting competitions against Israeli athletes, and reports cited by the International Judo Federation (IJF) said Iranian athletes had thrown matches and used questionable injuries to avoid such encounters.

In a 2024 interview, co-director Zar Amir Ebrahimi said the film was inspired by Saeid Mollaei, who was told by his federation to lose at the 2019 World Championships rather than face an Israeli athlete. Mollaei said Iranian authorities pressured him during the 2019 World Judo Championships to withdraw in order to avoid a potential final against Israeli judoka Sagi Muki, and the IJF said he had been repeatedly ordered by the Iranian government and national Olympic committee to pull out.

The IJF later said the conduct was a "serious breach and gross violation" of its statutes and imposed a protective suspension on the Iran Judo Federation. In 2021, following a later disciplinary ruling, the federation's IJF membership was provisionally withdrawn for four years, backdated from 18 September 2019 to 17 September 2023. After leaving Iran, Mollaei went into hiding in Germany and was later cleared to represent Mongolia.

While the characters and specific events in Tatami are fictionalized, the film's premise reflects documented cases in which athletes were ordered to withdraw or lose, rather than acting on their own initiative.
