= Adorn (song) =

Single by Miguel

from the album Kaleidoscope Dream
- Released: August 7, 2012
- Recorded: 2012
- Genre: R&B; electro soul
- Length: 3:13: 2:27 (promotional edit)
- Label: RCA
- Songwriter: Miguel Pimentel
- Producer: Miguel

Miguel singles chronology
"Pride N Joy" (2012)	"Adorn" (2012)	"Do You..." (2012)

"Adorn" is a song written and recorded by American singer and songwriter Miguel. It was released as the lead single from his 2012 studio album Kaleidoscope Dream. The recording was produced by Miguel, who was inspired by his girlfriend and a series of dreams he had prior to writing the song.

"Adorn" was released to iTunes on August 7, 2012. It peaked at number 17 on the Billboard Hot 100, number 35 on the Mainstream Top 40, and number-one on the Hot R&B/Hip-Hop Songs chart, becoming Miguel's most successful single until "Sure Thing" became a sleeper hit in 2023. It was certified triple platinum by the Recording Industry Association of America (RIAA). The song was acclaimed by critics, being voted the year's second-best single in the annual Pazz & Jop poll. The song also earned Miguel three Grammy Award nominations, winning one for Best R&B Song.

== Music and lyrics ==
"Adorn" features on-beat sub-bass sounds, falsetto howls, irregular vocal echoes, obscured synths, and sparse keyboard arrangements. The lyrics feature brazen declarations of affection, including promises of adoration to a female subject. Writers liken "Adorn" to Marvin Gaye's 1982 ballad "Sexual Healing". Miguel was inspired to write the song by a series of dreams he had prior to writing it. His girlfriend (now ex-wife), model and artist Nazanin Mandi, was also an inspiration behind the song. Miguel later told People magazine: "I had been on a long trip and was anxious to see her. That's where the song began, with that emotion while I was on the plane. I don't remember how I got from 'These lips can't wait to taste your skin' to the end of the song, but when I listened to it, I thought, 'This is special.'"

== Release and promotion ==
"Adorn" originally appeared on the Miguel mixtape Art Dealer Chic, Vol. 1, released on February 27, 2012. It was later included on a promotional extended play titled Kaleidoscope Dream: The Water Preview on July 31, one of two extended plays released by Miguel to promote Kaleidoscope Dream. On August 7, "Adorn" was solicited to rhythmic contemporary radio stations in the United States, and released to iTunes. A remix of the song, featuring American rapper Wiz Khalifa, was released on September 18. A remix featuring Jessie Ware was released on July 10 2013.

The song earned Miguel three Grammy Award nominations for Song of the Year, Best R&B Song and Best R&B Performance at the 55th Grammy Awards, winning his first in the category of Best R&B Song.

== Critical reception ==
"Adorn" received widespread critical acclaim by music critics. In a review for Seattle Weekly, Erin Thompson wrote that Miguel "made a particularly nice choice of metaphor in the song's chorus—'Let my love adorn you.' When a woman hears the word 'adorn,' she probably thinks of diamonds and Dior; Miguel's rich vocals convey the same sense of luxury. That's a man who knows how to treat a woman." SoulBounce called it an "electro soul slice of niceness", while MSN Music's Robert Christgau cited the song's "throbbing, garbled hook" as "one of 2012's signature pop moments". Brian McManus from The Village Voice called "Adorn" "the perfect amuse-bouche for the album it kicks off, priming the ears, opening them." At the end of 2012, "Adorn" was named the 33rd best song of the year in Rolling Stone. It was also voted the year's second best single in the nationwide Pazz & Jop critics' poll.

== Chart performance ==
"Adorn" charted at number 17 on the Billboard Hot 100 and number-one on the Hot R&B/Hip-Hop Songs, becoming Miguel's second most successful single to date. It was also his third number-one hit on the R&B/Hip-Hop chart and still holds the record for the longest run atop the Hot R&B/Hip-Hop Airplay chart, being the only song in the chart's history to spend 20 or more weeks at number-one. By July 2013, the song had reached 1,014,000 copies sold in the US. By 2019, it had three million copies according to the Recording Industry Association of America (RIAA), who certified it triple platinum.

== Awards and nominations ==
Year	Ceremony	Result	Ref.
2013	Grammy Awards	Song of the Year	Nominated
2013	Grammy Awards	Best R&B Performance	Nominated
2013	Grammy Awards	Best R&B Song	Won

== Track listing ==
Digital download – Remix featuring Wiz Khalifa (United States)
No.	Title	Length
1.	"Adorn (Remix)" (featuring Wiz Khalifa)	3:47

== Charts ==
=== Weekly charts ===
Weekly chart performance for "Adorn"
Chart (2012–2013)	Peak position
Australia (ARIA)	61
Belgium (Ultratip Bubbling Under Flanders)	7
Belgium Urban (Ultratop Flanders)	26
Canada Hot 100 (Billboard)	68
France (SNEP)	163
UK Singles (Official Charts)	49
UK Hip Hop/R&B (Official Charts)	6
US Billboard Hot 100	17
US Adult R&B Songs (Billboard)	1
US Hot R&B/Hip-Hop Songs (Billboard)	1
US Pop Airplay (Billboard)	35
US Rhythmic Airplay (Billboard)	2

=== Year-end charts ===
2012 year-end chart performance for "Adorn"
Chart (2012)	Position
US Billboard Hot 100	97
US Hot R&B/Hip-Hop Songs (Billboard)	6
US Rhythmic (Billboard)	50

2013 year-end chart performance for "Adorn"
Chart (2013)	Position
US Billboard Hot 100	84
US Hot R&B/Hip-Hop Songs (Billboard)	15
US Rhythmic (Billboard)	39

=== Decade-end charts ===
Decade-end chart performance for "Adorn"
Chart (2010–2019)	Position
US Hot R&B/Hip-Hop Songs (Billboard)	34

== Radio and release history ==
Release dates for "Adorn"
Country	Date	Format	Labels
United States	August 7, 2012	Rhythmic contemporary radio	RCA
Germany	June 7, 2013	Digital download	

== Certifications ==
Certifications and sales for "Adorn"
Region	Certification	Certified units/sales
Australia (ARIA)	2× Platinum	140,000^{‡}
Denmark (IFPI Danmark)	Platinum	90,000^{‡}
New Zealand (RMNZ) remix featuring Jessie Ware	4× Platinum	120,000^{‡}
United Kingdom (BPI)	Platinum	600,000^{‡}
United States (RIAA)	3× Platinum	3,000,000^{‡}
^{‡} Sales+streaming figures based on certification alone.

== See also ==
- Billboard Year-End Hot 100 singles of 2012
- List of number-one R&B/hip-hop songs of 2012 (U.S.)
- Billboard Year-End Hot 100 singles of 2013
