= Mind Games (TV series) =

American drama television series

- Genre: Comedy drama
- Created by: Kyle Killen
- Starring: Steve Zahn; Christian Slater; Megalyn Echikunwoke; Wynn Everett; Gregory Marcel; Cedric Sanders; Jaime Ray Newman
- Composer: Johnny Klimek
- Country of origin: United States
- Original language: English
- No. of seasons: 1
- No. of episodes: 13 (8 unaired in the U.S.)

Production
- Executive producers: Kyle Killen; Keith Redmon; Timothy Busfield; Miguel Sapochnik
- Producer: Ed Milkovich
- Running time: 43 minutes
- Production companies: Letter Eleven; 20th Century Fox Television

Original release
- Network: ABC
- Release: February 25 – March 25, 2014

Mind Games is an American comedy-drama television series created by Kyle Killen that aired on ABC. The show is about two brothers who run a problem solving firm called Edwards and Associates that employs solutions based on psychological manipulation. It premiered on February 25, 2014, and was canceled on March 27, 2014.

== Cast and characters ==
- Steve Zahn as Clark Edwards, an ex-psychology professor with bipolar disorder. Clark is also an expert in human behavior from a psychological perspective.
- Christian Slater as Ross Edwards, a con man with a criminal record, who is Clark's brother.
- Megalyn Echikunwoke as Megan Shane, an actress.
- Wynn Everett as Claire Edwards, ex-wife of Ross Edwards.
- Gregory Marcel as Miles Hood, who had been a top graduate student in Clark's department.
- Cedric Sanders as Latrell Griffin, whose specialty is business development.
- Jaime Ray Newman as Samantha "Sam" Gordon, an ex-con.
- Katherine Cunningham as Beth Scott, Clark's girlfriend.

== Production and development ==
About the show, Kyle Killen says "It’s a weird workplace drama that’s set around this idea that we’ve conducted 60 years worth of research into the science of human behavior and manipulation. So this is a one-of-a-kind company that is trying to turn all that research into a weekly “Wag the Dog” kind of problem-solving company." He also said "I was just genuinely excited by the science and way these observations about human nature and the ways we're influenced without knowing it were coming out of the lab and being used to shape real world outcomes. It's an incredible amount of fun" He reiterated his enthusiasm during the Television Critics Association press tour saying "In terms of the likability of the characters, these are brothers who would like to connect and help people... [...] It certainly started with the idea of a moral grey area, but this has mainstream [appeal]." The show was originally titled Influence. Although there is a human behavior consulting firm in Chicago, TGG Group, the show is not based on this firm.

The show's initial episode order was filmed in Chicago at a record-setting time when Chicago had six television shows (Mind Games, Betrayal, Crisis, Chicago PD, the returning Chicago Fire, and Sirens) as well as three major motion pictures (Transformers: Age of Extinction, Jupiter Ascending, and Divergent) that were all filming simultaneously. Killen is joined by Keith Redman as an executive producer. The show was a 20th Century Fox Television production.

In May 2013, the show was announced as part of the 2013–14 schedule with Christian Slater and Steve Zahn as the stars. Megalyn Echikunwoke, Cedric Sanders, Gregory Marcel and Wynn Everett were announced as part of the supporting cast at that time. In August, Jaime Ray Newman was added to the cast.

On March 27, 2014, after five episodes were aired, the show was canceled due to low ratings.

According to IMDb, the remaining episodes aired in Japan, starting on July 15, 2014. The remaining episodes also aired in the UK. For US residents, the remaining episodes can be purchased through Amazon streaming.

== Episodes ==
| No. | Title | Directed by | Written by | Original release date | Prod. code | U.S. viewers (millions) |
|---|---|---|---|---|---|---|
| 1 | "Pilot" | Miguel Sapochnik | Kyle Killen | February 25, 2014 | 1AWY79 | 3.58 |
Clark and Ross Edwards are brothers who run a firm employing psychological techniques to influence outcomes for those in need. Clark's bipolar disorder drives him to hire Ross's ex-wife to keep it in check, creating tension. As the firm struggles to prove its legitimacy, they take the case of a mother trying to convince her insurance company to approve an experimental surgery for her son. Meanwhile, we learn that Ross was a shady investor who went to jail after his wife blew the whistle on him and Clark was a respected professor until he had an affair with a student named Beth and got fired over it. Later, it's revealed that Ross paid Beth to seduce Clark to get him fired so they could start a business together.
| 2 | "Asymmetric Dominance" | Miguel Sapochnik | Kyle Killen | March 4, 2014 | 1AWY01 | 2.39 |
The team takes on the case of a woman thought to be a shoo-in to be promoted to CEO, but is facing unexpected competition. Meanwhile, Ross tries to determine if Beth's return is for love or for money.
| 3 | "Pet Rock" | Timothy Busfield | Donald Todd | March 11, 2014 | 1AWY02 | 2.68 |
A girl's parents seek help in getting her out of a cult, but the cult leader proves far more versed in manipulative techniques than Clark realized. Ross and Claire clash over telling Clark the truth about Beth.
| 4 | "Apophenia" | Arlene Sanford | Kyle Killen | March 18, 2014 | 1AWY05 | 2.44 |
When a congressman changes his mind about a controversial gun bill, his son approaches the team to change it back. Meanwhile, a reporter is preparing an exposé that threatens to bring down the firm.
| 5 | "Cauliflower Man" | Romeo Tirone | Eli Attie | March 25, 2014 | 1AWY03 | 2.06 |
A disgraced and unbelieved whistleblower wants the team to convince his ex-coworker to become a whistleblower, too, while the firm deals with a lack of funds and Clark's manic episode which leaves him unavailable for the case.
| 6 | "Texts, Lies and Audiotape" | Sarah Pia Anderson | John E. Pogue | July 15, 2014 (Japan) | 1AWY04 | N/A |
An adulterer asks the team to help end his affair with his mistress while keeping a happy marriage with his wife. They decide to get his mistress to distrust him. Meanwhile, Clark deals with the aftermath of his car crash with Beth and the team tries to help Clark look likable to Beth's parents.
| 7 | "Judge Not" | Steve Robin | Michael Jones-Morales | July 22, 2014 (Japan) | 1AWY06 | N/A |
A couple who adopted a baby ask the team to help keep the baby when the birth mother changes her mind. Meanwhile, Sam becomes reacquainted with an old friend and con artist partner who owes money to some goons who will kill him otherwise. She points out that Miles has a trust fund that they can try to steal.
| 8 | "Royal Fiasco" | David Boyd | Rebecca Kirsch | July 29, 2014 (Japan) | 1AWY07 | N/A |
The drummer from rock band Royal Fiasco asks the team to reunite his former bandmates. Sam's friend Martin initiates his con of Miles. Ross and Sam's relationship hits a few bumps. Clark and Beth try to adjust as roommates.
| 9 | "The Sweet Science" | Matt Penn | Marisa Wegrzyn | August 5, 2014 (Japan) | 1AWY08 | N/A |
Miles and Megan take on a more active role in the team as an aged boxer's wife asks them to convince her husband to opt out of a dangerous exhibition match, but they later decide to help him win based on his mental makeup. Meanwhile, Sam wrestles with her conscience as Martin continues his con of Miles.
| 10 | "N.D.E" | Timothy Busfield | Kyle Killen & Kristine Huntley | August 12, 2014 (Japan) | 1AWY09 | N/A |
A bride to be with doubts asks the team to psychologically make her able to say "I do". They decide to achieve this with an NDE (Near Death Experience). Meanwhile, Sam and Martin continue their con of Miles and Sam blackmails Ross after he figures her out and threatens to expose her. In the end, this whole con was cooked up by Martin to steal Miles' trust fund and his goons are in on it. Sam was conned into helping Martin by being tricked into thinking she was saving his life. However, once she figures it out, she cons Martin by returning the money to Miles but making it look like she took it and left the country. Then she flees the country, so Martin will come after her and leave Miles alone.
| 11 | "Embodied Cognition" | Robert Duncan McNeill | Eli Attie | August 19, 2014 (Japan) | 1AWY10 | N/A |
A young girl who lost her mother to cancer asks the team to get her father and her karate instructor together. Also, Clark has a new career opportunity to mull over at a university. Meanwhile, Sam is trying to survive on the run in a foreign country with no money. After Martin's goon Vincent captures her, he tries to get his money back by coercing Ross into assisting with a job.
| 12 | "As God Is My Witness" | Stephen Cragg | Donald Todd | August 26, 2014 (Japan) | 1AWY11 | N/A |
Vincent's son is on trial for beating someone that a priest apparently saw. He tells Ross to get the team to erase a priest's memory before testifying. If he fails, Sam dies. Meanwhile, Clark is contemplating asking Beth to marry her and taking the career offer. After Ross gets Clark to help, they consider closing Edwards and Associates and the Associates consider carrying on the company without them. Meanwhile, Clark stumbles upon the truth about Ross initially hiring Beth to set him up. In the aftermath, most of the lies and deception throughout the season come to light. Also, the erasure of the priest's memory didn't happen and they have only a little more time to get it done or else.
| 13 | "Balloon Boy" | Kyle Killen | Kyle Killen | September 2, 2014 (Japan) | 1AWY12 | N/A |
Clark recruits the rest of the team to have another go at tampering with the priest's memory by having Vincent's son hold different balloons and wearing different outfits in front of a camera so they can subliminally air them to the priest. Then when they drop a bunch of balloons, it'll make the priest doubt his memory. But in reality, they realize that Vincent's son is sickened by this lifestyle and the only way for his life to improve is to confess and not be under his father's thumb anymore. When they drop the balloons, it'll trigger the guilt and make him desire to confess. In the aftermath, Vincent's son pleads it out. Vincent, thinking they were doing what they promised, spares Sam's life. Ross is ready to leave everybody and move to another state until Clark admits that he enjoys working with him and convinces him to stay. Clark and Ross reconcile with a handshake. Clark then tells Ross that there is a way to help them both with his disorder. Since they are no longer part of Edwards and Associates, they hire the rest of the team to do a job for them that will help them. Had the series continued, the details of the job would have likely been revealed.

== Reception ==
TV Equals' P. T. Jackson viewed the show as appealing because it was a program "with characters that think outside the box but have hearts of gold and help people". He likened the show to Franklin & Bash for its outrageous quirkiness. Zap2it's Laurel Brown said that the characters' life histories "help them get inside the human mind better than anyone else". The show was also described as having similarities to Leverage.

TV.com's Tim Surette called it the second most anticipated new show for midseason 2014, saying, "This could be the fun, underdog drama that ABC has been searching for. After the pilot's airing he said, "When compared to Killen's past work, Mind Games doesn't hold up in terms of ambition and risk. But there's enough piquant possibility here to make it a daring experiment in the procedural genre."
