= Guy Nattiv =

Israeli-American film director, producer and screenwriter

- גיא נתיב
- Guy Nattiv at the 17th Governors Awards, November 2026
- Born: May 24, 1973 (age 53); Tel Aviv, Israel
- Occupations: Filmmaker and producer
- Years active: 1998-present
- Known for: Winning Academy Awards for Best Short Film in 2018
- Notable work: Skin (2018 short film); Skin (2018 feature film); Strangers; Mabul
- Spouse: Jaime Ray Newman (m. 2012)
- Children: 2

Guy Nattiv (Hebrew: גיא נתיב; born May 24, 1973) is an Israeli-American filmmaker based in Los Angeles. His short film Skin won the Academy Award for Best Live Action Short Film at the 91st Academy Awards.

== Early life and education ==
Guy Nattiv was born on May 24, 1973, in Tel Aviv, Israel. His grandparents were Holocaust survivors. He graduated in 2000 from Camera Obscura film school in Tel Aviv.

== Career ==
=== Early work (1998–2014) ===
Nattiv worked in advertising early in his career. He served as head copywriter and then chief creative director for the advertising agency Publicis Groupe for seven years.

He began his career as a film director and screenwriter in 2002, directing his graduate short film at Camera Obscura film school in Tel Aviv. The Flood won dozens of awards at international film festivals, including the Crystal Bear Award at the Berlin International Film Festival for best short film.

In 2003, he began collaborating with director Erez Tadmor. Together they directed the short film Strangers, starring Guy Loell and Sami Samir, about a Jew and an Arab who meet on a train and encounter a group of neo-Nazi skinheads. The film screened in the Panorama section of the 2004 Berlin International Film Festival and won the Online Film Festival Audience Award for short filmmaking at the 2004 Sundance Film Festival, as well as the Wolgin Award for best short film at the 2004 Jerusalem Film Festival. Strangers also won awards at more than 30 international film festivals and was shortlisted for an Academy Award.

Nattiv and Tadmor's second short film, Offside, starring Liron Levo and Ido Musari, won the short-film award at the 2006 Manhattan Short Film Festival.

In 2007 Nattiv and Tadmor expanded their short film Strangers into a feature of the same name. The film stars Liron Levo and Lubna Azabal as an Israeli man and a Palestinian woman who meet in Berlin during the 2006 FIFA World Cup. Strangers has screened at dozens of international film festivals, including the official competition at the 2008 Sundance Film Festival and the 2008 Tribeca Film Festival. Strangers has been sold and distributed in more than 28 countries. In addition, Lubna Azabal won the Most Promising Actress Award at the 2008 Jerusalem Film Festival.

In 2010, Nattiv wrote and directed his second feature Mabul aka The Flood which was nominated for six Israeli Ophir Awards. The film stars Ronit Elkabetz, Yoav Rotman, Tzahi Grad and Michael Moshonov, who also won the Ophir Award for Best Supporting Actor. Mabul won a Special Mention at the 2011 Berlin Film Festival (Generation category), the Audience Award and Special Artistic Achievement in the 2011 Thessaloniki Film Festival and was nominated at the 2011 Asia Pacific Screen Awards for Best Children's Feature Film.

His third feature film Magic Men (co-directed with Erez Tadmor) follows a father and son on a journey through northern Greece in search of a missing Greek magician. The film stars Makram Khoury and Zohar Strauss. The script was written in collaboration with Sharon Maymon. The film was produced by Shemi Shoenfeld and Amitan Menelzon with the investment of the Rabinowitz Foundation and Channel 10. It received four nominations at the Ophir Awards, including Best Picture, Supporting Actor, and Best Original Score, and won awards for Best Actor from the Israeli Critics Circle. The film earned Khoury the Ophir Award for Best Actor.

Nattiv and Tadmor's final collaboration was a 12-minute short film called Dear God (2014), starring Lior Ashkenazi as a Western Wall guard who sets out to fulfil the wishes in a woman's prayer notes, opposite Reymond Amsalem. The film was funded by the Film and Television "Makor Fund" and was nominated for an Ophir Israeli Award in the Best Short Film category. The directors described it as the last of three largely wordless short films they made together, following Strangers and Offside.

=== Skin (2018–2019) ===
In 2018, Nattiv made his first American short film, titled Skin, which focuses on the cascading effects of a single hate crime and its impact on the community. He co-wrote the script with Sharon Maymon, who came up with the original idea. Skin was co-produced with Nattiv's wife and creative partner, Jaime Ray Newman, and stars Danielle Mcdonald, as well as Lonnie Chavis, Jonathan Tucker, Ashley Thomas and Jackson Robert Scott.

Skin won the Academy Award for Best Live Action Short Film at the 91st Academy Awards. Variety called Nattiv "an undeniably gifted filmmaker" and his short film a "stunner". Avner Shavit, a veteran film critic for the Israeli news site Walla!, told The Wrap the he had "never seen anything like it." The film screened at more than 400 film festivals and won 31 awards including the Academy Award for Best Live Action Short Film.

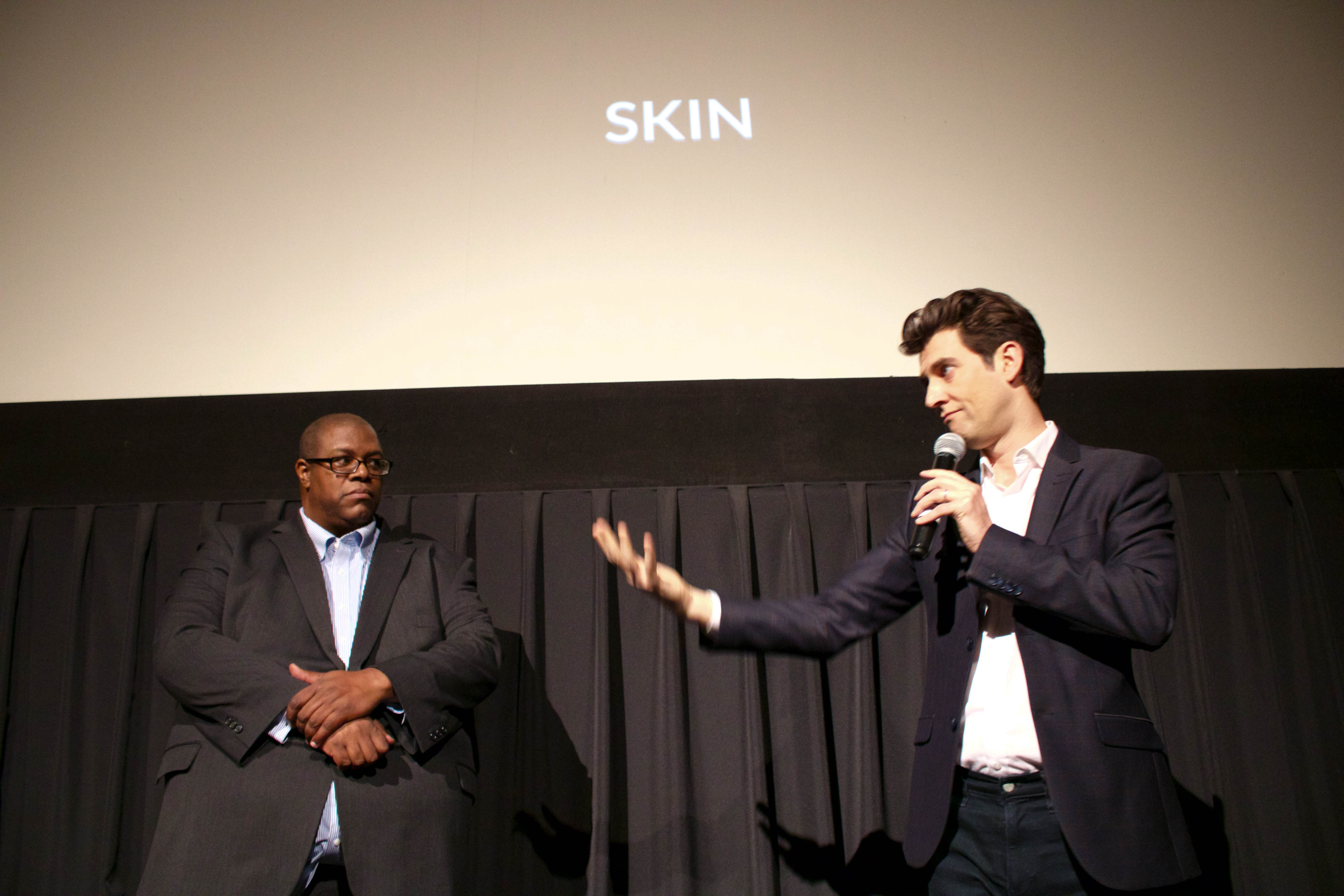
Daryle Lamont Jenkins and Guy Nattiv at the premiere of Skin during the 2019 Montclair Film Festival

In 2018, Nattiv's feature film, Skin, which was made in collaboration with his wife, was released. It is a separate story from the short, and is based on the life of Bryon Widner, a former neo-Nazi skinhead who left the movement and had his facial tattoos removed. He later became an FBI informant and one of the most prominent spokesmen against his former groups.

The film stars Jamie Bell as Widner, with Vera Farmiga, Danielle Macdonald, Bill Camp, Louisa Krause, Mike Colter and Mary Stuart Masterson. Its producers included Nattiv, Newman, Oren Moverman, Celine Rattray, and Trudie Styler, Sting's wife. Skin was released by DirecTV on June 27, and in theaters by A24 on July 26, 2019.

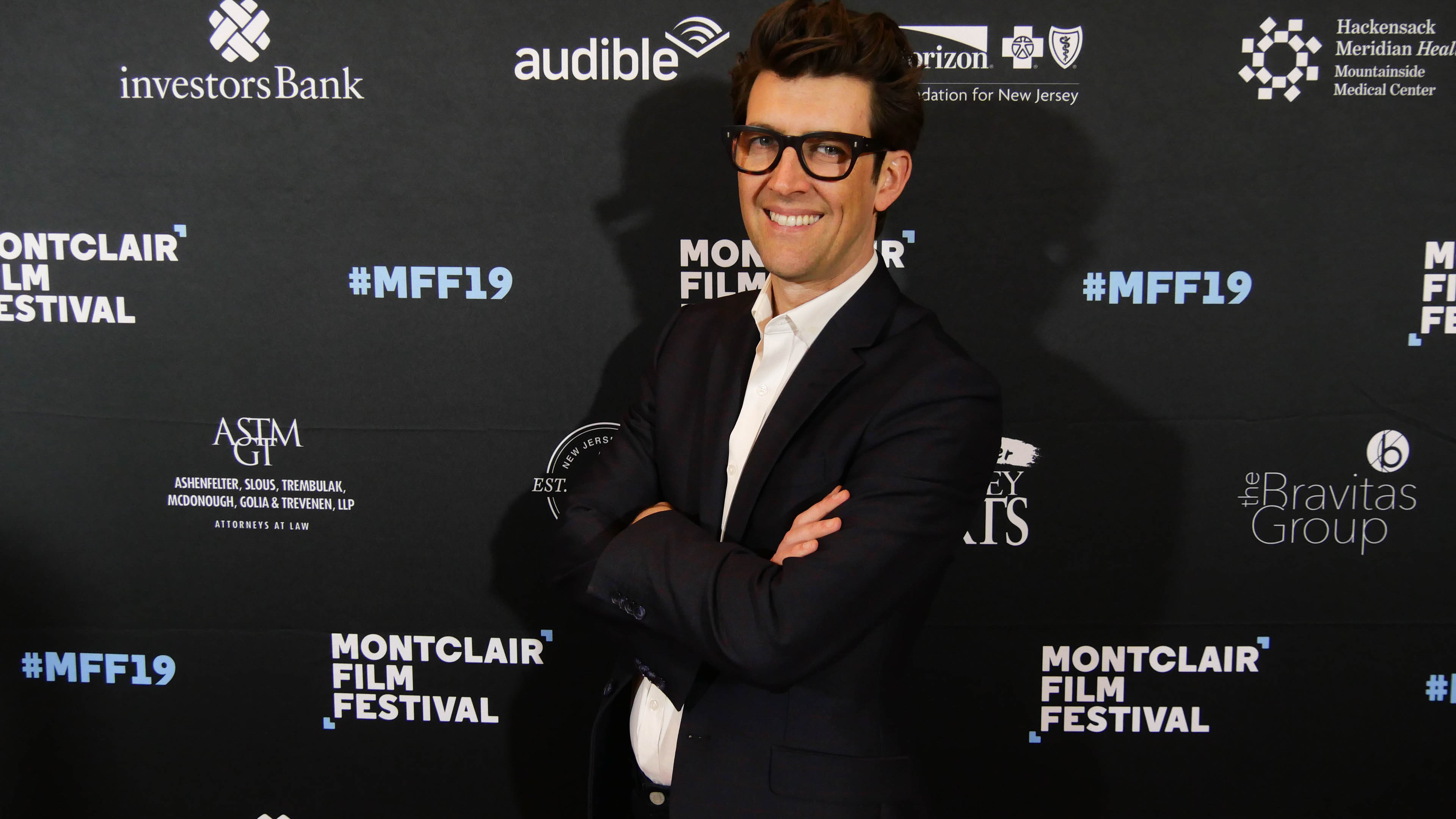
Guy Nattiv at the premiere of Skin during the 2019 Montclair Film Festival

The feature-length version premiered at the Toronto Film Festival, where it won the FIPRESCI Prize, an award given by the International Federation of Film Critics. It was sold to more than 30 countries and screened at the Deauville Film Festival. The Hollywood Reporter called Bell's performance "moving" and "powerful".

In January 2020, Nattiv and Jaime Ray Newman were reported to be developing The Stuntwoman, a limited series for Keshet Studios based on on a memoir by stunt coordinator Julie Ann Johnson and Deadline's investigative journalist David Robb. The series is about Johnson, a pioneer in the field of women's stunt performance and one of Hollywood's first whistleblowers, who became one of the first female stunt coordinators in Hollywood in the 1970s.

=== Life Unexpected (2021) ===
In 2021, Nattiv and Newman co-directed Life Unexpected, a short documentary about their experience of infertility, assembled from home footage filmed over ten years.

The short film is a co-production between New Native Pictures, Katsina Communication, and Channel HOT. It premiered at the Lighthouse International Film Festival in June 2021. Toronto-based Ouat Media has the world distribution rights for the documentary.

=== Golda (2023) ===
Nattiv was attached to direct Golda, written by Nicholas Martin and starring Helen Mirren. The plot of the film focuses on the decisions made by Israeli prime minister Golda Meir during the Yom Kippur War, when the combined forces of Egypt, Syria and Jordan launched a surprise attack on Israel in 1973.

Golda was produced by Michael Kuhn, Nicholas Martin, and Jane Hooks.

=== Tatami (2023) ===
In 2023, Nattiv co-directed Tatami with Zar Amir Ebrahimi, from a screenplay he co-wrote with Elham Erfani. It was the first feature film co-directed by an Iranian and an Israeli filmmaker since the Iranian Revolution.

The film follows an Iranian female judoka (Arienne Mandi) and her coach Maryam (Zar Amir Ebrahimi), who are ordered by the Iranian government to fake an injury and withdraw from the World Judo Championships to avoid a possible match against an Israeli opponent.

The film stars Arienne Mandi, Amir Ebrahimi, Jaime Ray Newman, Ash Goldeh and Sina Parvaneh. It was produced by Adi Ezroni and Mandy Tagger Brockey, alongside New Native Pictures. Other production companies involved in the project included White Lodge Productions, Maven Pictures, Tale Runners and Sarke Studios.

Tatami had its world premiere at the 80th Venice International Film Festival on September 2, 2023, receiving positive reviews from the critics and audience. Its Asian premiere took place at the 36th Tokyo International Film Festival on October 25, 2023. It was also screened at the 19th Zurich Film Festival on October 2, 2023.

In February 2024, XYZ Films acquired US distribution rights to the film. WestEnd Films acquired international rights in February 2023.

=== The Liberation (2025–present) ===
Nattiv's most recent feature, The Liberation, developed under the working title Harmonia, is a psychological drama inspired by the life of his grandmother, a Holocaust survivor who left her family in the 1980s to join an all-female cult in the United States. Co-written with Noa Berman-Herzberg, it stars Carrie Coon as Rita Cooper, with Lily James, Bella Ramsey, Odessa Young and Tracy Letts. It was filmed in British Columbia in the summer of 2025.

== Accolades ==
Nattiv's film Skin won the Academy Award for Best Live Action Short Film at the 91st Academy Awards. Nattiv was the first Israeli director to win an Academy Award since Moshé Mizrahi, whose French film Madame Rosa won the award for Best Foreign Language Film in 1978. According to Gal Uchovsky, Nattiv's win was "a big deal" because it could open doors for other Israeli filmmakers hoping to succeed in Hollywood.

Nattiv has been an official member of the Academy of Motion Picture Arts and Sciences since 2019. That year, he also received the IFF Achievement in Film Award at the 33rd Israel Film Festival. Nattiv was inducted as a new member of the European Film Academy in 2024.

== Personal life ==
In 2012, Nattiv married actress and producer Jaime Ray Newman. In 2015, Nattiv moved to Los Angeles, California. The couple has two daughters. In 2018, they founded the production company New Native Pictures.

== Filmography ==
Short film

Year	Title	Director	Writer	Producer	Refs.
2002	Mabul (The Flood)	Yes	Yes	Yes	
2003	Strangers	Yes	Yes	Yes	
2006	Offside	Yes	Yes	Yes	
2006	Dear God	Yes	Yes	No	
2018	Skin	Yes	Yes	Yes	
2021	Life Unexpected	Yes	Yes	Yes	
2023	Wild Summon	No	No	Yes	

Feature film

Year	Title	Director	Writer	Producer	Notes	Refs.
2007	Strangers	Yes	Yes	No		
2010	Mabul (The Flood)	Yes	Yes	No		
2014	Magic Men	Yes	Yes	No		
2018	Skin	Yes	Yes	Yes		
2023	Golda	Yes	No	No		
2023	Tatami	Yes	Yes	Yes	Co-directed with Zar Amir Ebrahimi	
2026	The Liberation	Yes	Yes	Yes		

== Awards and nominations ==
Short film

Year	Title	Awards
2002	Mabul (The Flood)	Best Short Film at the Berlin International Film Festival
2003	Strangers	BAFTA/LA Award for Excellence at Aspen Shortsfest; Audience Award at the Sundance Film Festival
2006	Offside	Prize of the Romanian National Office of Cinematography at the Alter-Native International Short Film Festival
2006	Dear God	Nomination for the Ophir Award as the Best Short Film
2018	Skin	Academy Award for Best Live Action Short Film

Feature film

Year	Title	Awards
2007	Strangers	Nominated for the Grand Jury Prize at the 2008 Sundance Film Festival
2010	Mabul (The Flood)	Best Film at the The Haifa International Film Festival; honorary mention at the 2011 Berlin Film Festival
2014	Magic Men	Ophir Award for Best Actor (Makram Khoury)
2018	Skin	FIPRESCI Prize, an award given by the International Federation of Film Critics
2023	Golda	Cinema for Peace Dove for Most Valuable Film of the Year

== See also ==
- List of Israeli Academy Award winners and nominees
