= Miguel discography =

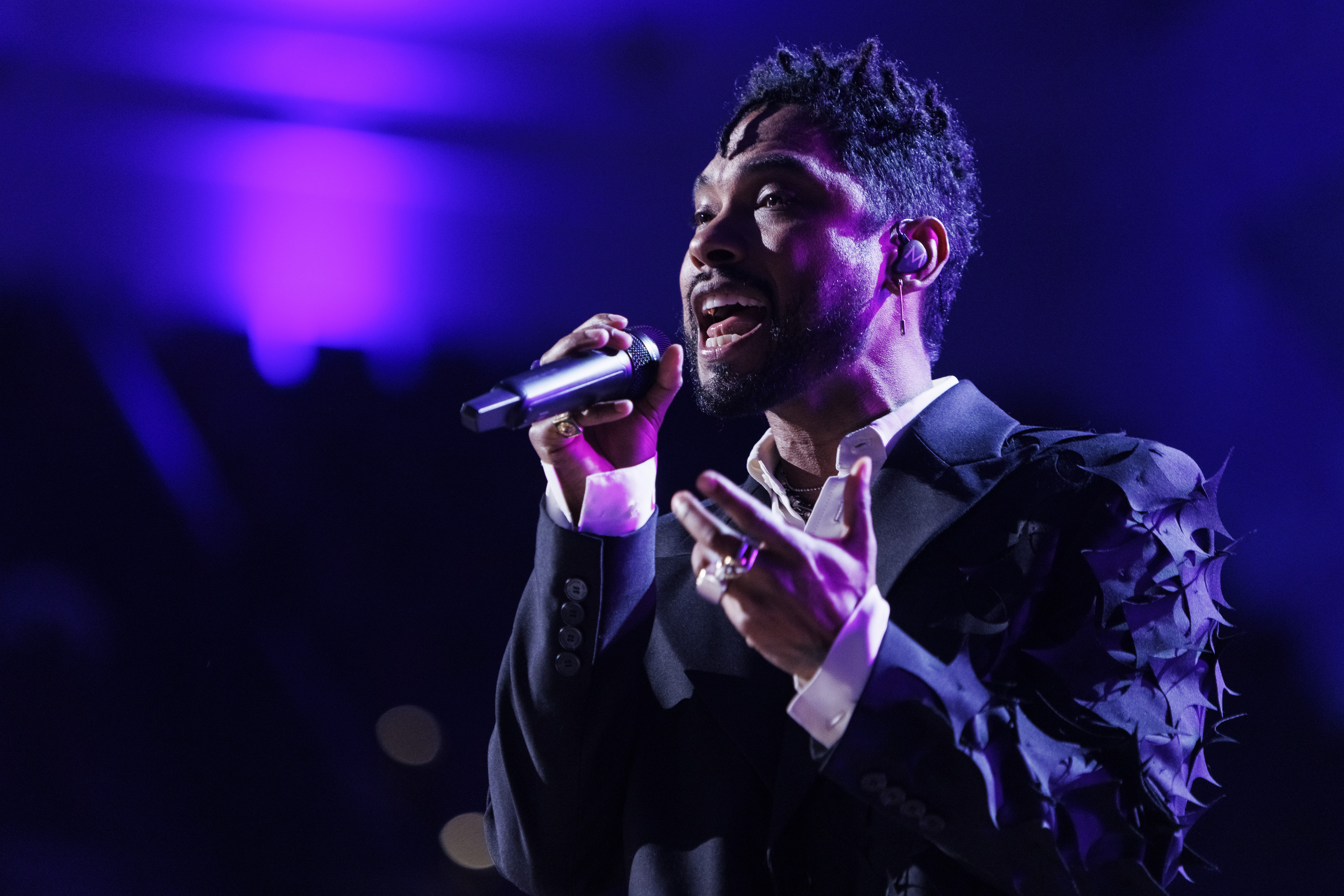
- Miguel performing in 2022
- Studio albums: 5
- Mixtapes: 4
- EPs: 6
- Live albums: 3
- Singles: 28

American R&B singer-songwriter Miguel has released 5 studio albums, 4 mixtapes, 6 extended plays, 3 live albums and 28 singles.

== Studio albums ==
List of studio albums, with selected chart positions, sales figures and certifications
Title	Album details	Peak chart positions									Sales	Certifications
Title	Album details	US	US R&B /HH	AUS	CAN	DEN	NLD	NZ	UK	UK R&B	Sales	Certifications
All I Want Is You	Released: November 30, 2010; Label: ByStorm, Jive; Formats: CD, digital download, streaming	37	9	—	60	—	43	—	—	—	US: 404,000	RIAA: Platinum; BPI: Silver; RMNZ: 3× Platinum
Kaleidoscope Dream	Released: September 25, 2012; Label: ByStorm, RCA; Formats: CD, LP, digital download, streaming	3	1	45	—	26	—	—	—	13	US: 535,000	RIAA: Platinum; BPI: Silver; RMNZ: Platinum
Wildheart	Released: June 29, 2015; Label: ByStorm, RCA; Formats: CD, LP, digital download, streaming	2	2	8	10	—	88	16	31	4	US: 65,000	RMNZ: Gold
War & Leisure	Released: December 1, 2017; Label: ByStorm, RCA; Formats: CD, LP, digital download, streaming	9	1	44	28	—	74	24	92	9	US: 16,000	RIAA: Gold; RMNZ: Platinum
Caos	Released: October 23, 2025; Label: ByStorm, RCA; Formats: CD, LP, digital download, streaming	—	—	—	—	—	—	—	—	—		
"—" denotes a recording that did not chart or was not released in that territory.

== Mixtapes ==
List of mixtapes with selected details
Title	Album details
Mischief: The Mixtape	Released: September 29, 2008; Label: Self-released; Formats: Digital download
Art Dealer Chic, Vol. 1	Released: February 27, 2012; Label: Bystorm, RCA; Formats: Digital download, streaming
Art Dealer Chic, Vol. 2	Released: March 27, 2012; Label: ByStorm, RCA; Formats: Digital download, streaming
Art Dealer Chic, Vol. 3	Released: April 27, 2012; Label: ByStorm, RCA; Formats: Digital download, streaming

== Extended plays ==
List of extended plays with selected details
Title	Album details	Peak chart positions
Title	Album details	US Latin
Kaleidoscope Dream: The Water Preview	Released: July 30, 2012; Label: RCA; Formats: Digital download, streaming	—
Kaleidoscope Dream: The Air Preview	Released: September 10, 2012; Label: RCA; Formats: Digital download, streaming	—
nwa.hollywooddreams.coffee.	Released: December 19, 2014; Label: Self-released; Formats: Digital download	—
Rogue Waves	Released: February 26, 2016; Label: RCA; Formats: Digital download, streaming	—
Te Lo Dije	Released: April 5, 2019; Label: ByStorm, RCA; Formats: Digital download, streaming	11
Art Dealer Chic 4	Released: April 9, 2021; Label: ByStorm, RCA; Formats: Digital download, streaming	—
"—" denotes a recording that did not chart or was not released in that territory.

== Live albums ==
List of live albums with selected details
Title	Album details
iTunes Festival: London 2012	Released: August 31, 2012; Label: RCA; Formats: Digital download, streaming
Spotify Sessions London	Released: July 2, 2013; Label: RCA; Formats: Digital download, streaming
Spotify Sessions	Released: July 24, 2016; Label: ByStorm, RCA; Formats: Digital download, streaming

== Singles ==
=== As lead artist ===
List of singles as lead artist, with selected chart positions and certifications, showing year released and album name
Title	Year	Peak chart positions										Certifications	Album
Title	Year	US	US R&B /HH	US R&B	US Rhy.	AUS	BEL (FL) Tip	CAN	FRA	NZ Hot	UK	Certifications	Album
"All I Want Is You" (featuring J. Cole or remix featuring Rick Ross)	2010	58	7	—	23	—	—	—	—	—	—	RIAA: Platinum; BPI: Silver; RMNZ: 2× Platinum	All I Want Is You
"Sure Thing" (solo or remix featuring Pusha T)	2010	11	8	3	14	6	—	15	66	—	4	RIAA: 3× Platinum; ARIA: 8× Platinum; BPI: 3× Platinum; RMNZ: 10× Platinum	All I Want Is You
"Quickie" (solo or remix featuring Big Sean)	2011	62	3	—	23	—	—	—	—	—	—	RIAA: Gold; RMNZ: Gold	All I Want Is You
"Girls Like You"	2011	—	43	—	—	—	—	—	—	—	—		All I Want Is You
"Adorn" (solo or remix featuring Wiz Khalifa or Jessie Ware)	2012	17	1	2	2	61	7	68	163	—	49	RIAA: 3× Platinum; ARIA: 2× Platinum; BPI: Platinum; RMNZ: 4× Platinum	Kaleidoscope Dream
"Do You..."	2012	— (Note: "Do You..." did not enter the Billboard Hot 100 chart, but peaked at number two on the Bubbling Under Hot 100 Singles chart.)	32	10	29	—	—	—	—	—	—	RIAA: Gold	Kaleidoscope Dream
"How Many Drinks?" (solo or remix featuring Kendrick Lamar)	2013	69	24	7	31	—	—	—	—	—	—	RIAA: Platinum; ARIA: Gold; BPI: Silver; RMNZ: 2× Platinum	Kaleidoscope Dream
"Simple Things" (solo or remix featuring Chris Brown and Future)	2014	—	— (Note: "Simple Things" did not enter the Billboard Hot R&B/Hip-Hop Songs chart, but peaked at number five on the Bubbling Under R&B/Hip-Hop Singles chart.)	16	—	—	—	—	—	—	—	RIAA: Platinum; ARIA: Gold; MC: Gold; RMNZ: Gold	Wildheart
"Coffee" (solo or featuring Wale)	2015	78	26	9	39	78	32	—	—	—	97	RIAA: Platinum; ARIA: Gold; BPI: Silver; MC: Gold; RMNZ: Platinum	Wildheart
"Waves" (solo or remix featuring Travis Scott)	2016	—	46	20	—	—	—	—	—	—	—	RIAA: Gold; ARIA: Platinum; MC: Gold; RMNZ: Platinum	Wildheart
"2 Lovin U" (with DJ Premier)	2017	—	—	—	—	—	—	—	—	—	—		Non-album single
"Sky Walker" (featuring Travis Scott)	2017	29	14	2	1	—	—	87	—	— (Note: "Sky Walker" did not enter the NZ Top 40 Singles Chart or Hot Singles Chart, but peaked at number five on the NZ Heatseeker Singles Chart.)	—	RIAA: 3× Platinum; BPI: Gold; MC: 2× Platinum; RMNZ: 4× Platinum	War & Leisure
"Shockandawe"	2017	—	—	—	—	—	—	—	—	—	—		Non-album single
"Told You So"	2017	—	—	21	—	—	—	—	—	—	—		War & Leisure
"Come Through and Chill" (featuring J. Cole and Salaam Remi)	2018	— (Note: "Come Through and Chill" did not enter the Billboard Hot 100 chart, but peaked at number one on the Bubbling Under Hot 100 Singles chart.)	44	8	18	—	—	—	—	— (Note: "Come Through and Chill" did not enter the NZ Top 40 Singles Chart or Hot Singles Chart, but peaked at number six on the NZ Heatseeker Singles Chart.)	—	RIAA: Platinum; BPI: Silver; MC: Gold; RMNZ: 2× Platinum	War & Leisure
"Python"	2018	—	—	—	—	—	—	—	—	—	—		Non-album single
"Banana Clip" (Spanish Version)	2018	—	—	—	—	—	—	—	—	—	—	ARIA: Gold; RMNZ: Platinum	Te Lo Dije
"I Found You / Nilda's Story" (with Benny Blanco and Calvin Harris)	2019	—	—	—	—	—	—	—	—	—	—		Non-album single
"Show Me Love" (with Alicia Keys)	2019	90	—	9	—	—	—	—	—	17	—	RIAA: Platinum	Alicia
"Funeral"	2019	—	—	—	—	—	—	—	—	30	—		Art Dealer Chic 4
"Don't Forget My Love" (with Diplo)	2022	—	—	—	—	—	—	—	—	8	30	RIAA: Gold; BPI: Platinum; RMNZ: Gold	Diplo
"Give It to Me"	2023	—	—	22	32	—	—	—	—	37	—		Non-album singles
"Number 9" (featuring Lil Yachty)	2023	—	—	—	—	—	—	—	—	—	—		Non-album singles
"Always Time"	2024	—	—	—	—	—	—	—	—	—	—		Caos
"New Martyrs (Ride 4 U)"	2025	—	—	—	—	—	—	—	—	36	—		Caos
"El Pleito"	2025	—	—	—	—	—	—	—	—	—	—		Caos
"RIP"	2025	—	—	—	—	—	—	—	—	—	—		Caos
"Caos"	2025	—	—	—	—	—	—	—	—	—	—		Caos
"—" denotes a title that did not chart, or was not released in that territory.

=== As featured artist ===
List of singles as featured artist, with selected chart positions and certifications, showing year released and album name
Title	Year	Peak chart positions									Certifications	Album
Title	Year	US	US R&B /HH	AUS	BEL (FL) Tip	CAN	FRA	IRL	NZ	UK	Certifications	Album
"Lotus Flower Bomb" (Wale featuring Miguel)	2011	38	1	—	—	—	—	—	—	—	RIAA: Platinum; RMNZ: Platinum	Ambition
"Slide" (Baby Bash featuring Miguel)	2011	—	77	—	—	—	—	—	—	—		Non-album singles
"Pride n Joy" (Fat Joe featuring Kanye West, Miguel, Jadakiss, Mos Def, DJ Khaled, Roscoe Dash and Busta Rhymes)	2012	—	81	—	—	—	—	—	—	—		Non-album singles
"Power Trip" (J. Cole featuring Miguel)	2013	19	5	—	56	—	—	—	—	46	RIAA: Platinum; BPI: Platinum; RMNZ: 4× Platinum	Born Sinner
"#Beautiful" (Mariah Carey featuring Miguel)	2013	15	3	6	50	27	41	86	10	22	RIAA: Platinum; ARIA: Platinum; BPI: Silver; RMNZ: 2× Platinum	Me. I Am Mariah... The Elusive Chanteuse
"PrimeTime" (Janelle Monáe featuring Miguel)	2013	— (Note: "PrimeTime" did not enter the Billboard Hot 100 chart, but peaked at number 20 on the Bubbling Under Hot 100 Singles chart.)	36	—	—	—	—	—	—	—		The Electric Lady
"This Is Not a Game" (The Chemical Brothers featuring Miguel and Lorde)	2014	—	—	—	—	—	—	—	—	—		The Hunger Games: Mockingjay, Pt. 1 – Original Motion Picture Soundtrack
"Good Lovin'" (Ludacris featuring Miguel)	2014	91	30	—	—	—	—	—	—	—	RIAA: Gold; RMNZ: Gold	Ludaversal
"Everyday" (ASAP Rocky featuring Miguel, Rod Stewart and Mark Ronson)	2015	92	31	49	14	87	192	92	—	56	RIAA: Platinum; ARIA: Platinum; BPI: Platinum; RMNZ: 4× Platinum	At. Long. Last. ASAP
"Weekend" (Mac Miller featuring Miguel)	2016	— (Note: "Weekend" did not enter the Billboard Hot 100 chart, but peaked at number 25 on the Bubbling Under Hot 100 Singles chart.)	46	—	—	—	—	—	—	—	RIAA: 3× Platinum; BPI: Silver; RMNZ: 3× Platinum	GO:OD AM
"XPlicit" (French Montana featuring Miguel)	2016	—	—	—	—	—	—	—	—	—		MC4
"Come Through and Chill" (Salaam Remi featuring Miguel)	2016	—	—	—	—	—	—	—	—	—		Non-album single
"Estrella Fugaz" (Illya Kuryaki and the Valderramas featuring Miguel)	2016	—	—	—	—	—	—	—	—	—		L.H.O.N.
"Overtime" (Schoolboy Q featuring Miguel and Justine Skye)	2016	—	50	—	—	—	—	—	—	—		Blank Face LP
"Lost in Your Light" (Dua Lipa featuring Miguel)	2017	—	—	—	—	—	—	97	— (Note: "Lost in Your Light" did not enter the NZ Top 40 Singles Chart, but peaked at number 10 on the NZ Heatseeker Singles Chart.)	86	BPI: Silver; RMNZ: Gold	Dua Lipa
"Stay for It" (RL Grime featuring Miguel)	2017	—	—	—	—	—	—	—	—	—		Non-album singles
"Sunshine" (Kyle featuring Miguel)	2017	—	—	—	—	—	—	—	—	—		Non-album singles
"Backstage" (OverDoz. featuring Miguel)	2017	—	—	—	—	—	—	—	—	—		2008
"Oásis" (Emicida featuring Miguel)	2017	—	—	—	—	—	—	—	—	—		Non-album single
"Remind Me to Forget" (Kygo featuring Miguel)	2018	63	—	14	21	35	27	29	29	69	ARIA: 2× Platinum; BPI: Silver; MC: 4× Platinum; RMNZ: 2× Platinum; SNEP: Platinum	Kids in Love
"Got Friends" (GoldLink featuring Miguel)	2018	—	—	—	—	—	—	—	—	—		Non-album single
"Stay Woke" (Meek Mill featuring Miguel)	2018	—	—	—	—	—	—	—	—	—		Legends of the Summer
"Light Me Up" (RL Grime featuring Miguel and Julia Michaels)	2018	—	—	—	—	—	—	—	—	—		Nova
"Happiness Over Everything (H.O.E.)" (Jhené Aiko featuring Future and Miguel)	2020	65	41	—	—	—	—	—	31	—	RIAA: Platinum	Chilombo
"Too Much" (Ro James featuring Miguel)	2020	—	—	—	—	—	—	—	—	—		Non-album singles
"Sunbathe" (Tainy featuring Miguel)	2021	—	—	—	—	—	—	—	—	—		Non-album singles
"Jeans" (Jessie Reyez featuring Miguel)	2023	—	—	—	—	—	—	—	— (Note: "Jeans" did not enter the NZ Top 40 Singles Chart, but peaked at number 36 on the NZ Heatseeker Singles Chart.)	—		Paid in Memories
"Sweet Dreams" (J-Hope featuring Miguel)	2025	66	—	—	—	79	—	—	— (Note: "Sweet Dreams" did not enter the NZ Top 40 Singles Chart, but peaked at number 8 on the NZ Hot Singles Chart.)	42		Non-album single
"Negotiate" (Kilo Kish featuring Miguel)	2025	—	—	—	—	—	—	—	—	—		Negotiations
"—" denotes a title that did not chart, or was not released in that territory.

=== Promotional singles ===
List of promotional singles, showing year released and album name
Title	Year	Album
"R.A.N."	2018	Superfly: Original Motion Picture Soundtrack

== Other charted and certified songs ==
List of songs, with selected chart positions and certifications, showing year released and album name
Title	Year	Peak chart positions			Certifications	Album
Title	Year	US Bub.	US R&B	NZ Hot	Certifications	Album
"Girl with the Tattoo Enter.lewd"	2010	—	—	—	ARIA: Gold; BPI: Gold; RMNZ: 2× Platinum	All I Want Is You
"Satisfied"	2016	14	—	—		The Hamilton Mixtape
"Remember Me (Dúo)" (featuring Natalia Lafourcade)	2017	—	—	—	RIAA: Gold	Coco
"Pineapple Skies"	2017	25	14	—	ARIA: Platinum; RMNZ: Platinum	War & Leisure
"Woah" (Rich the Kid featuring Miguel and Ty Dolla $ign)	2019	—	—	—	RMNZ: Gold	The World Is Yours 2
"So I Lie"	2021	—	—	39		Art Dealer Chic 4
"—" denotes a title that did not chart, or was not released in that territory.

== Guest appearances ==
List of non-single guest appearances, with other performing artists, showing year released and album name
Title	Year	Other artist(s)	Album
"Language of Life"	2002	Glory	Language of Life
"The Many Times"	2006	Esthero	None
"Summertime in LA"	2006	Exile	Dirty Science
"First Things First"	2007	Blu & Exile	Below the Heavens
"Cold Hearted"	2007	Blu & Exile	Below the Heavens
"You Are Now in the Clouds with ...(The Koochie Monstas')"	2007	Blu & Exile	Below the Heavens
"In the Building"	2008	Johnson&Jonson	Johnson&Jonson
"His Dream"	2009	Asher Roth	Asleep in the Bread Aisle
"Raise Your Hands"	2011	David Guetta	None
"Hoe"	2011	Jhené Aiko	Sailing Soul(s)
"Slide Over"	2012	Baby Bash	Unsung the Album
"Summer on Smash"	2012	Nas, Swizz Beatz	Life Is Good
"Clouds"	2012	DJ Drama, Rick Ross, Pusha T, Curren$y	Quality Street Music
"Come Here"	2013	Talib Kweli	Prisoner of Conscious
"Ashley"	2013	Big Sean	Hall of Fame
"No Exit"	2013	Childish Gambino	Because the Internet
"Bennie and the Jets"	2014	Wale	Goodbye Yellow Brick Road: Revisited & Beyond
"Indy"	2014	Santana	Corazón
"My Girl"	2014	Smokey Robinson, Aloe Blacc, JC Chasez	Smokey & Friends
"Deepspace"	2015	Hudson Mohawke	Lantern
"Echoes"	2015	Talib Kweli, Patrick Stump	Fuck the Money
"Good Intentions"	2015	Disclosure	Caracal
"Weekend"	2015	Mac Miller	GO:OD AM
"Back to Sleep (Remix 2)"	2016	Chris Brown, August Alsina, Trey Songz	None
"Cadillac"	2016	None	The Get Down
"Overload"	2016	John Legend	Darkness and Light
"Earth"	2018	Lil Dicky	None
"Demons & Angels"	2019	G-Eazy, The Game	Scary Nights
"No Smoke"	2019	The Game, Travis Barker	Born 2 Rap
"Death Fantasy"	2022	Kilo Kish	American Gurl
"Saturnine"	2024	Justice	Hyperdrama

== Production discography ==
List of production and songwriting credits (excluding guest appearances, interpolations, and samples)
Track	Year	Credit	Artist	Album
3. "IfULeave"	2008	Songwriter	Musiq Soulchild	OnMyRadio
15. "Revolver"	2008	Songwriter, background vocals	Usher	Here I Stand
11. "His Dream"	2009	Songwriter, additional vocals	Asher Roth	Asleep in the Bread Aisle
3. "Finding My Way Back"	2010	Songwriter	Jaheim	Another Round
1. "Monstar"	2010	Songwriter	Usher	Raymond v. Raymond
9. "Pro Lover"	2010	Songwriter	Usher	Raymond v. Raymond
2. "Tonight (Best You Ever Had)"; (featuring Ludacris)	2012	Songwriter	John Legend	Think like a Man soundtrack
8. "Rocket"	2013	Songwriter	Beyoncé	BEYONCÉ
2. "You and I (Forever)"	2014	Songwriter	Jessie Ware	Tough Love
6. "Kind Of...Sometimes...Maybe"	2014	Songwriter, background vocals	Jessie Ware	Tough Love
"LA Confidential"	2016	Songwriter	Tory Lanez	—N/a
11. "The Fall"	2019	Songwriter	BANKS	III
"Same Problems?"	2023	Songwriter, additional vocals, bass	ASAP Rocky	Don't Be Dumb

== Music videos ==
=== As lead artist ===
List of music videos
Title	Year	Director(s)
"Getcha Hands Up" (featuring Major)	2006	Black Ice Entertainment
"All I Want Is You" (featuring J. Cole)	2010	Alex Moors
"Sure Thing"	2011	Hype Williams
"Quickie"	2011	Alex Moors
"Girls Like You"	2011	Alex Moors
"Adorn"	2012	Jason Beattie
"Do You..."	2012	Constellation Jones
"The Thrill"	2012	Danny Ocean
"Candles in the Sun"	2013	Sarah McColgan
"How Many Drinks?" (featuring Kendrick Lamar)	2013	Constellation Jones
"Simplethings"	2014	Sarah McColgan, Miguel
"Coffee"	2015	Duncan Winecoff
"NWA"	2015	Duncan Winecoff
"NWA"(version 2) (featuring Kurupt)	2015	Dr. Zodiak
"...goingtohell"	2015	Darren Winecoff
"Waves"	2015	Darren Craig
"Waves (Remix)" (featuring Travis Scott)	2016	Willo Perron
"2 Lovin U" (with DJ Premier)	2017	Born Ready Films
"Sky Walker" (featuring Travis Scott)	2017	Director X
"Told You So"	2017	Karim Huu Do
"Now"	2017	Miguel
"Come Through and Chill" (featuring J. Cole and Salaam Remi)	2018	Kevin Calero
