= List of awards and nominations received by Miguel =

Miguel awards and nominations
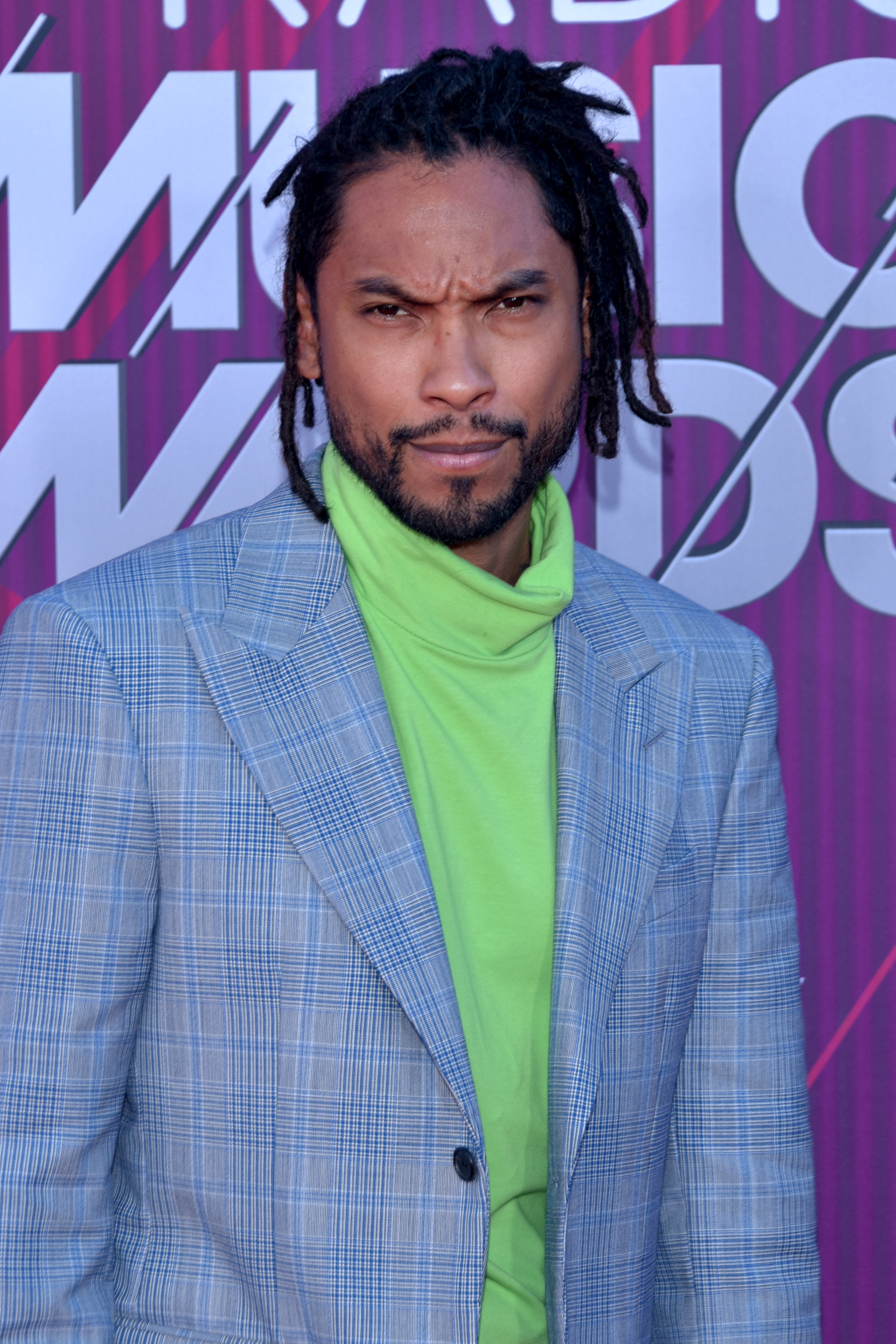
- Miguel at the 2019 iHeartRadio Music Awards
Awards and nominations
| Award | Wins | Nominations |

Totals (Note: Certain award groups do not simply award one winner. They acknowledge several different recipients, have runners-up, and have third place. Since this is a specific recognition and is different from losing an award, runner-up mentions are considered wins in this award tally. For simplification and to avoid errors, each award in this list has been presumed to have had a prior nomination.)
- Wins: 7
- Nominations: 41

Miguel Jontel Pimentel is an American singer, songwriter, record producer, and actor. Raised in San Pedro, California, he began pursuing a music career at age thirteen. After signing to Jive Records in 2007, Miguel released his debut studio album, All I Want Is You, in November 2010. Although it was underpromoted upon its release, the album became a sleeper hit and helped Miguel garner commercial standing.

== American Music Awards ==
The American Music Awards is an annual awards ceremony created by Dick Clark in 1973.

| Year | Nominee / work | Award | Result |
|---|---|---|---|
| 2011 | Miguel | Sprint New Artist of the Year | Nominated |
| 2013 | Miguel | Favorite Soul/R&B Male Artist | Nominated |

== BET Awards ==
| Year | Nominee / work | Award | Result |
|---|---|---|---|
| 2011 | Himself | Best New Artist | Nominated |
| 2012 | Himself | Best Male R&B Artist | Nominated |
| 2012 | "Lotus Flower Bomb" (with Wale) | Best Collaboration | Won |
| 2012 | "Lotus Flower Bomb" (with Wale) | Coca-Cola Viewer's Choice Award | Nominated |
| 2013 | Himself | Best Male R&B Artist | Won |
| 2013 | Himself | Centric Award | Nominated |
| 2013 | "Adorn" | Video of the Year | Nominated |
| 2013 | "Adorn" | Coca-Cola Viewer's Choice Award | Nominated |

== Billboard Awards ==
| Year | Nominee / work | Award | Result |
|---|---|---|---|
| 2012 | Himself | Top R&B Artist | Nominated |
| 2012 | "Sure Thing" | Top R&B Song | Nominated |
| 2013 | "Adorn" | Top R&B Song | Nominated |
| 2013 | Himself | Milestone Award | Nominated |

== Grammy Awards ==
The Grammy Awards are awarded annually by the National Academy of Recording Arts and Sciences of the United States for outstanding achievements in the music industry.

| Year | Nominee / work | Award | Result |
|---|---|---|---|
| 2011 | "Finding My Way Back" | Best R&B Song | Nominated |
| 2013 | "Lotus Flower Bomb" (with Wale) | Best Rap Song | Nominated |
| 2013 | "Adorn" | Best R&B Song | Won |
| 2013 | "Adorn" | Song of the Year | Nominated |
| 2013 | "Adorn" | Best R&B Performance | Nominated |
| 2013 | Kaleidoscope Dream | Best Urban Contemporary Album | Nominated |
| 2014 | "Power Trip" (with J. Cole) | Best Rap/Sung Collaboration | Nominated |
| 2014 | "How Many Drinks?" (with Kendrick Lamar) | Best R&B Performance | Nominated |
| 2016 | "Coffee" | Best R&B Song | Nominated |
| 2016 | Wildheart | Best Urban Contemporary Album | Nominated |
| 2019 | "Come Through and Chill" (with J. Cole and Salaam Remi) | Best R&B Song | Nominated |
| 2019 | War & Leisure | Best Urban Contemporary Album | Nominated |
| 2023 | "Don't Forget My Love" (with Diplo) | Best Dance/Electronic Recording | Nominated |

iHeartRadio Music Awards

| Year | Nominee / work | Award | Result |
|---|---|---|---|
| 2019 | "Remind Me to Forget" (with Kygo) | Dance Song of the Year | Nominated |
| 2019 | "Sky Walker" (with Travis Scott) | R&B Song of the Year | Nominated |
| 2019 | Miguel | R&B Artist of the Year | Nominated |

iHeartRadio Titanium Award
| Year | Nominee/Work | Award | Result |
|---|---|---|---|
| 2023 | "Sure Thing" | Titanium Award -1 Billion Total Audience Spins on iHeartRadio Stations | Won |

== NAACP Image Awards ==
The NAACP Image Awards is an award presented annually by the American National Association for the Advancement of Colored People to honor outstanding people of color in film, television, music and literature.

| Year | Nominee / work | Award | Result |
|---|---|---|---|
| 2013 | Miguel | Outstanding Male Artist | Nominated |
| 2013 | "Adorn" | Outstanding Music Video | Nominated |

MTV Video Music Awards

| Year | Nominee / work | Award | Result |
|---|---|---|---|
| 2013 | "Candles in the Sun" | Best Video with a Message | Nominated |

Soul Train Music Awards

| Year | Nominee / work | Award | Result |
|---|---|---|---|
| 2011 | "Sure Thing" | Song of the Year | Nominated |
| 2011 | Himself | Best New Artist | Won |
| 2012 | Himself | Best R&B/Soul Male Artist | Won |
| 2012 | "Tonight (Best You Ever Had)" | The Ashford & Simpson Songwriter's Award | Won |
| 2012 | "Lotus Flower Bomb" (with Wale) | Song of the Year | Nominated |
| 2012 | "Lotus Flower Bomb" (with Wale) | Best Hip-Hop Song of the Year | Nominated |
| 2013 | Kaleidoscope Dream | Album of the Year | Nominated |
| 2013 | "How Many Drinks?" | Best Collaboration | Nominated |
| 2013 | "Power Trip" (with J. Cole) | Best Collaboration | Nominated |
| 2013 | "Power Trip" (with J. Cole) | Best Hip-Hop Song of the Year | Nominated |
| 2013 | Himself | Best R&B/Soul Male Artist | Won |
| 2018 | War & Leisure | Album of the Year | Nominated |

== Teen Choice Awards ==
The Teen Choice Awards is an annual awards show that airs on the Fox television network. The awards honor the year's biggest achievements in music, film, sports, television, fashion, and more, voted by viewers aged 11 to 20.

| Year | Nominee / work | Award | Result |
|---|---|---|---|
| 2013 | Himself | Choice Music: R&B Artist | Nominated |

== World Music Awards ==
The World Music Awards were established in 1989 and is an international awards show that annually honors musicians based on their worldwide sales figures, which are provided by the International Federation of the Phonographic Industry.

| Year | Nominee / work | Award | Result |
|---|---|---|---|
| 2013 | Himself | Best Male Artist | Nominated |
| 2013 | Himself | Entertainer of the Year | Nominated |
| 2013 | "Adorn" | Best Song | Nominated |
