= Shockandawe =

Single by Miguel
- Released: September 7, 2017
- Length: 2:30
- Label: ByStorm; RCA
- Songwriters: Miguel Pimentel; Andrew "Pop" Wansel; Warren "Oak" Felder; Steve Mostyn; Ronald Colson
- Producer: Pop & Oak

Miguel singles chronology
"Sky Walker" (2017)	"Shockandawe" (2017)	"Told You So" (2017)

"Shockandawe" is a song by American singer and songwriter Miguel. It was written by Miguel, Steve Mostyn, Ronald Colson, Warren "Oak" Felder and Andrew "Pop" Wansel, with production handled by Pop & Oak. The song was released through ByStorm Entertainment and RCA Records on September 7, 2017, as a single following "Sky Walker", but it was not included on Miguel's fourth studio album War & Leisure.

== Background ==
The song appeared on YouTube as audio streaming on September 7, 2017, and was made available on other streaming services at midnight on September 8, 2017.

== Critical reception ==
Camille Augustin of Vibe felt the "feel-good track" will put listeners "in a good mood or transport you to the nearest fashion week runway as you strut down the street". Julia Pimentel of Complex wrote that the song "has a slightly different vibe" than normal expectations, and "it sounds a lot more rock-influenced". Patrick Lyons of Merry Jane deemed the song "a shorter and less radio-ready jam that gets Miguel back to the rock influence he explored on his last album". Beatrice Hazlehurst of Paper described the song as "Miguel's sexiest offering in a minute", and called it a "reminiscent of all those sweaty club nights and shooting glances across the dance floor". Corbin Reiff of Uproxx thinks that the song "has a distinct sultry vibe, fueled by a number of different guitar parts intertwined together". Rap-Up regarded the song as "a politically-charged banger that offers global commentary over genre-bending grooves". Kevin Goddard of HotNewHipHop called the song "a funky and hypnotizing record", and opined that it is "definitely refreshingly new and out-of-the-box, something we like to hear from Miguel" instead of a "traditional R&B record". Tyler Schmitt of Variance described the song as "buoyant". Randall Colburn of Consequence of Sound referred the song to "a robust, pulsing track strung together with intertwining guitar lines and an urgent vocal melody that finds Miguel warning a partner".

== Credits and personnel ==
Credits adapted from Tidal.

- Miguel – songwriting
- Pop & Oak – songwriting, production
- Steve Mostyn – songwriting
- Ronald Colson – songwriting
- David Davis – mixing engineering
- Randy Merrill – mastering engineering
- Michael Peterson – assistant engineering
