= Burning Bridges (EP) =

EP by Ludacris
- Released: December 16, 2014
- Genre: Hip-hop
- Length: 23:08
- Label: Disturbing tha Peace; Def Jam

Ludacris chronology
Battle of the Sexes (2010)	Burning Bridges (2014)	Ludaversal (2015)

Singles from Burning Bridges
- 1. "Good Lovin'" Released: December 15, 2014

Burning Bridges is the first extended play (EP) by American hip-hop recording artist Ludacris. It was released through the iTunes Store on December 16, 2014. Burning Bridges features guest appearances from Rick Ross, CeeLo Green, John Legend, Jason Aldean and Miguel. With the exception of the intro, all tracks were released again on Ludacris's next album Ludaversal in 2015.

== Track listing ==
No.	Title	Writer(s)	Length
1.	"New Beginning Intro"	Christopher Bridges; Ramon Owen	1:34
2.	"Money" (featuring Rick Ross)	Christopher Bridges; Clarence McDonald; William Roberts; Lowrell Simon	4:53
3.	"Problems" (featuring CeeLo Green)	Christopher Bridges; Tyler Williams	3:59
4.	"In My Life" (featuring John Legend)	Ralph Benatar; Christopher Bridges; Guy Delo; Douglas Lucas; John Stephens	4:53
5.	"Burning Bridges" (featuring Jason Aldean)	Christopher Bridges; Jamie N Commons; Alexander Grant	4:05
6.	"Good Lovin'" (featuring Miguel)	Christopher Bridges; Ernest Clark; Aaron Michael Cox; Marcos Palacios; Miguel Pimentel	3:44

== Charts ==
Chart (2015)	Peak position
US Billboard 200	158
US Top R&B/Hip-Hop Albums (Billboard)	23
US Top Rap Albums (Billboard)	18
