= Party Girls =

Single by Ludacris featuring Wiz Khalifa, Jeremih and Cashmere Cat

from the album Ludaversal (intended)
- Released: January 30, 2014
- Recorded: 2013
- Length: 4:15
- Label: Disturbing tha Peace; Def Jam
- Songwriters: Christopher Bridges; Cameron Thomaz; Magnus Høiberg; Jeremy Felton; Søren Rasted; Claus Norreen; René Dif; Lene Nystrøm
- Producers: Cashmere Cat; Benny Blanco; Lido

Ludacris singles chronology
"All Around the World" (2013)	"Party Girls" (2014)	"Good Lovin" (2014)

Wiz Khalifa singles chronology
"Or Nah" (2014)	"Party Girls" (2014)	"We Dem Boyz" (2014)

Jeremih singles chronology
"All That (Lady)" (2013)	"Party Girls" (2014)	"Don't Tell 'Em" (2014)

Cashmere Cat singles chronology
"With Me" (2013)	"Party Girls" (2014)	"Ice Rink" (2015)

"Party Girls" is a song by American rapper Ludacris featuring American singer Jeremih, fellow American rapper Wiz Khalifa, and American record producer Cashmere Cat. Produced alongside Benny Blanco & Lido, it contains an interpolation of 1997 hit single "Barbie Girl" by Danish-Norwegian dance-pop group Aqua. It was released January 30, 2014 in promotion of his ninth studio album, Ludaversal; this single along with "Rest of My Life" and "Representin" were not included on the album's final track list. The song peaked at number 36 on the Billboard Hot R&B/Hip-Hop Songs chart.

== Music video ==
The music video was directed by Hype Williams and was filmed in Miami. On February 16, 2014, Ludacris posted two clips and a few other pictures from the shooting on his Instagram. A behind-the-scenes video was released on April 28, 2014, and the next day the video premiered.

== Charts ==
Chart (2014)	Peak position
US Bubbling Under Hot 100 (Billboard)	13
US Hot R&B/Hip-Hop Songs (Billboard)	36
US Rhythmic Airplay (Billboard)	39

== Release history ==
Region	Date	Format	Record label
United States	February 18, 2014	Rhythmic contemporary	Disturbing tha Peace; Def Jam Recordings; The Island Def Jam Music Group
United States	February 18, 2014	Urban contemporary	Disturbing tha Peace; Def Jam Recordings; The Island Def Jam Music Group
