= Told You So (Miguel song) =

Single by Miguel

from the album War & Leisure
- Released: November 3, 2017
- Genre: Funk, electronic
- Length: 3:10
- Label: ByStorm; RCA
- Songwriters: Miguel Pimentel; Jeff Bhasker; Nathan Perez
- Producers: Miguel; Jeff Bhasker; Happy Perez

Miguel singles chronology
"Shockandawe" (2017)	"Told You So" (2017)	"Remind Me to Forget" (2018)

Music video
- "Told You So" on YouTube

"Told You So" is a song by American singer/songwriter Miguel. Written and produced by Miguel, Jeff Bhasker and Happy Perez, it was released through ByStorm Entertainment and RCA Records, as the second single from Miguel's fourth studio album, War & Leisure. A Spanish version entitled "Te Lo Dije" featuring Latin girl group Flor de Toloache was included on his 2019 EP of the same name.

== Critical reception ==
Carl Lamarre of Billboard wrote that the song "has a vibrant, electric feel, which finds the singer promising 'not to control you,' and giving his lover the ample space needed to thrive on her lonesome". Jordan Sargent of Spin opined that Miguel returns to recreating the sounds of '80s R&B with this single and "puts an energetic spin on the classics". He called the song "a guitar-powered funk song with a distinct attitude and squelchy, aquatic percussion that helps it feel fresh" and "the type of song that Miguel is consistently great at writing". Ryan Reed of Rolling Stone wrote that Miguel "utilizes nimble synth-bass and stabbing electric guitars" and "croons his signature melismatic lines on the chorus", deeming the song an "upbeat cut". Joshua Espinoza of Complex felt the song "highlights Miguel's musical versatility, as it features an up-beat, retro-infused sound that is quite different from the album's previously released single 'Sky Walker' featuring Travis Scott". Similarly, Mitch Findlay of HotNewHipHop also called this song "a departure from the moody atmosphere of 'Sky Walker'", making it "heavy on the eighties vibe, coming through a dance-friendly radio record". He wrote that it is "somewhat reminiscent of some of Pharrell Williams or Bruno Mars' more commercial efforts". Megan Buerger of Pitchfork regarded the song as "a funk jam baked with layers of meaning". An editor of Cool Hunting wrote that the song "brings a politically-charged spirit to Miguel's music", regarding it "a departure for the singer, with a fervor and immediacy to the catchy tune".

== Music video ==
The accompanying music video, directed by Miguel and Karim Huu Do, sees the singer dancing in the desert and on top of an old car, intercut with a series of political scenes, including protests, demonstrations, as well as images of Martin Luther King Jr. and President Donald Trump. The video ended with an aircraft explosion, bringing awareness to social and political issues facing the nation. Miguel wrote: "A little over a year ago, Karim Hu Doo and I created one of my favorite visuals for one of my favorite songs on War & Leisure called 'Told You So.'"

== Credits and personnel ==
Credits adapted from Tidal.

- Miguel – songwriting, production, keyboard, guitar
- Jeff Bhasker – songwriting, production, keyboard, guitar
- Happy Perez – songwriting, production, keyboard, guitar
- Spike Stent – mixing engineering
- David Davis – engineering
- Michael Freeman – engineering
- William Delaney VI – engineering
- Bo Bodnar – engineering
- Geoff Swan – engineering

== Charts ==
Chart (2017)	Peak position
US Hot R&B Songs (Billboard)	21
