= All I Want Is You (Miguel song) =

Single by Miguel featuring J. Cole

from the album All I Want Is You
- Released: May 25, 2010
- Recorded: 2009
- Genre: R&B; neo soul; Hip-Hop
- Length: 4:57
- Label: Jive
- Songwriters: Miguel Pimentel; Jermaine Cole; Salaam Gibbs
- Producer: Salaam Remi

Miguel singles chronology
| "All I Want Is You" (2010) | "Sure Thing" (2011) |

J. Cole singles chronology
| "Just Begun" (2010) | "All I Want Is You" (2010) | "Who Dat" (2010) |

Music video
- "All I Want Is You" on YouTube

"All I Want Is You" is the debut single by American R&B recording artist Miguel released as the lead single from his debut album of the same name (2010). The song features rapper J. Cole and was produced by Salaam Remi. The song was released as a digital download on May 25, 2010. A remix featuring an additional verse by Rick Ross was released on September 8. Another remix, by gospel supergroup Klarkent (LaShawn Daniels, Gerald Haddon, Isaac Carree and Eric Dawkins), was released on November 4.

== Charts ==
=== Weekly charts ===
| Chart (2010–11) | Peak position |
|---|---|
| US Billboard Hot 100 | 58 |
| US Adult R&B Songs (Billboard) | 21 |
| US Hot R&B/Hip-Hop Songs (Billboard) | 7 |
| US Rhythmic Airplay (Billboard) | 23 |

=== Year-end charts ===
| Chart (2010) | Position |
|---|---|
| US Hot R&B/Hip-Hop Songs (Billboard) | 69 |

== Certifications ==
| Region | Certification | Certified units/sales |
|---|---|---|
| New Zealand (RMNZ) | 2× Platinum | 60,000^{‡} |
| New Zealand (RMNZ) remix featuring Rick Ross | Gold | 15,000^{‡} |
| United Kingdom (BPI) | Silver | 200,000^{‡} |
| United States (RIAA) | Platinum | 1,000,000^{‡} |
^{‡} Sales+streaming figures based on certification alone.

== Release history ==
| Country | Date | Format | Label |
|---|---|---|---|
| United States | May 25, 2010 | Digital download | Jive |

== Covers ==
Raheem DeVaughn has covered the song in 2015 with All I Want Is You (Remake).
