= Good Lovin (Ludacris song) =

"Good Lovin'"

Single by Ludacris featuring Miguel

from the album Burning Bridges and Ludaversal
- Released: December 15, 2014
- Recorded: 2011–14
- Genre: Hip hop
- Length: 3:44
- Label: Disturbing tha Peace; Def Jam
- Songwriters: Christopher Bridges; Miguel Pimentel
- Producer: Da Internz

Ludacris singles chronology
"Party Girls" (2014)	"Good Lovin'" (2014)	"Come & See Me" (2015)

Miguel singles chronology
"PrimeTime" (2013)	"Good Lovin" (2014)	"Coffee" (2015)

"Good Lovin" is a song by American rapper Ludacris, featuring vocals from American singer Miguel. The song was released December 15, 2014 as the first single from Burning Bridges EP and later Ludaversal. The track was produced by Da Internz.

== Background ==
The track premiered online October 31, 2014 before its official release on Google Play and later, iTunes.

== Charts ==
Chart (2014–15)	Peak position
US Billboard Hot 100	91
US Hot R&B/Hip-Hop Songs (Billboard)	30
US Rhythmic Airplay (Billboard)	16

== Certifications ==
Region	Certification	Certified units/sales
New Zealand (RMNZ)	Gold	15,000^{‡}
United States (RIAA)	Gold	500,000^{‡}
^{‡} Sales+streaming figures based on certification alone.
