= Caos (Miguel album) =

2025 studio album by Miguel

Studio album by Miguel
- Released: October 23, 2025
- Genre: Alternative R&B
- Length: 36:49
- Languages: English; Spanish
- Labels: ByStorm; RCA
- Producers: Jeff Bhasker; Rob Bisel; Ray Brady; Dahi; Jerry Duplessis; Jimmy Edgar; Carter Lang; Dion Lee; Major; Miguel; Steve Mostyn; Nonchalant Savant; Ely Rise; Dave Sitek

Miguel chronology
Art Dealer Chic 4 (2021)	Caos (2025)

Singles from Caos
- 1. "Always Time" Released: November 22, 2024; 2. "New Martyrs (Ride 4 U)" Released: September 5, 2025; 3. "El Pleito" Released: September 15, 2025; 4. "RIP" Released: September 29, 2025; 5. "Caos" Released: October 6, 2025

Caos (stylized in all caps) is the fifth studio album by American singer Miguel. It was released on October 23, 2025, through ByStorm Entertainment and RCA Records, and is his first studio release in eight years following War & Leisure (2017).

== Background and themes ==
Miguel has described Caos as emerging from a period of personal transformation. In his words: "To rebuild, I had to destroy myself. That is the core confrontation of Caos. Through my personal evolution, I learned that transformation is violent. Caos is the sonic iteration of me bending that violence into something universally felt." The album title — Spanish for “chaos” — underscores his exploration of disorder, rebirth, emotional turbulence, and existential themes. He has also said that Caos represents a more aggressive, boundary-pushing sonic direction, stepping beyond purely R&B into darker, more experimental textures.

== Release and promotion ==
Caos has been released on October 23, 2025, through ByStorm Entertainment and RCA Records. That date coincides with Miguel’s 40th birthday, adding symbolic resonance to the rollout. The announcement of the release was made in early September 2025, along with the debut of the title single on his own platform. As part of the Caos movement, Miguel released several promotional singles. "RIP", released on September 29, 2025, features cover art inspired by the Afro-Mexican Danza de los Diablos, aligning with the album's themes of cultural identity and resistance.

== Critical reception ==
Professional ratings
Aggregate scores
Source	Rating
Metacritic	65/100
Review scores
Source	Rating
AllMusic	3/5 stars
Clash	7/10
Pitchfork	6.8/10
Rolling Stone	3/5 stars

Caos received generally positive reviews from music critics. According to the review aggregator Metacritic, Caos received "generally favorable reviews" based on a weighted average score of 65 out of 100 from four critic scores.

Rolling Stone's Jon Dolan gave the album three stars rating out of five and wrote, "Caos isn’t an easy listen, often fading into a bleary haze and not quite coherently fulfilling the implications of its concept. But coherence isn’t really the point here. This is an album about searching for meaning as you try your best to process a world on fire — and it’s a mood that should resonate with any honest listener."

== Track listing ==
Caos track listing
No.	Title	Writer(s)	Producer(s)	Length
1.	"Caos"	Miguel Pimentel; Ray Brady	Miguel; Brady	3:17
2.	"The Killing"	M. Pimentel; Brady; Jimmy Edgar; Nicholas Pimentel	Miguel; Brady; Edgar; Nonchalant Savant	3:35
3.	"RIP"	M. Pimentel; Brady	Miguel; Brady	2:44
4.	"New Martyrs (Ride 4 U)"	M. Pimentel	Miguel	3:30
5.	"Triggered"	M. Pimentel; Dion Lee; Major	Miguel; Lee; Major	1:59
6.	"El Pleito"	M. Pimentel; Dacoury Natche; Ely Rise; Victor Salines	Dahi; Rise	2:34
7.	"Perderme"	M. Pimentel	Miguel	2:10
8.	"Oscillate"	M. Pimentel	Miguel	2:13
9.	"Nearsight [SID]"	M. Pimentel; Rob Bisel; Carter Lang	Miguel; Bisel; Lang; Ben "Bengineer" Chang^{[v]}	4:18
10.	"Angel's Song"	M. Pimentel	Miguel; Chang^{[v]}	3:25
11.	"Always Time"	M. Pimentel; Jeff Bhasker; Brady; Jerry Duplessis; David Andrew Sitek	Miguel; Brady; Bhasker; Duplessis; Sitek	3:24
12.	"Comma / Karma" (with George Clinton)	M. Pimentel; George Clinton; Steve Mostyn; Sitek	Miguel; Sitek; Mostyn	3:40
Total length:				36:49

=== Note ===
- ^{^[v]} indicates a vocal producer

== Personnel ==
Credits adapted from Tidal.

- Miguel – vocals (all tracks), mixing (tracks 6, 9)
- Manny Marroquin – mixing (1, 5, 9, 11)
- MUSYCA – choir vocals (1)
- Nathan Phillips – mixing (2, 7, 8, 10)
- Ben "Bengineer" Chang – mixing (4), engineering (4, 9)
- Heba Kadry – mixing (6), mastering (all tracks)
- Dave Sitek – mixing (12)
- Anthony Vilchis – engineering assistance (11)
- Trey Station – engineering assistance (11)
- Sandro – drums (5)
- Ray Brady – guitar (10)

== Release history ==
Release dates and formats for Caos
Region	Date	Format(s)	Label	Ref.
Various	October 23, 2025	CD; LP; digital download; streaming	ByStorm; RCA	
