= Waves (Miguel song) =

2016 song by Miguel

Promotional single by Miguel

from the album Wildheart
- Released: 2016
- Genre: R&B; psychedelic
- Length: 3:22
- Label: RCA; Black Ice; ByStorm
- Songwriters: Miguel Pimentel; Nathan Perez
- Producers: Pimentel; Happy Perez; Flippa

Miguel singles chronology
"Simple Things" (2015)	"Waves" (2016)	"2 Lovin U" (2017)

"Waves" is a song recorded by the American recording artist Miguel for his third studio album, Wildheart (2015). It was released as a promotional single from the album in 2016 through RCA Records.

In 2016, the singer released an extended play titled Rogue Waves, containing reimagined takes on the original song, from artists like Tame Impala, Kacey Musgraves and Travis Scott. Both the Tame Impala and Travis Scott remix received a music video, in addition to the original song.

== Music video ==
The song's original music video depicts Miguel performing at a club, interspersed with shots of him floating in water with his necklaces detached.

The remix video, directed by Jennifer Massaux, consists of clips of Miguel and Kevin Parker of Tame Impala along a furniture-littered beach, gazing upon the sky against a raging tempest. The clip only selects a minute and a half of the remix's original runtime. Chris Riotta at Mic further described the clip: "[It] shows both singers seated as waves come crashing ashore on a dimly lit beach. Both Miguel and Parker stare off into the distance as swarms of birds float above them." The video was shot in Los Angeles, with Miguel joking that "it only rains in LA when you’re filming [with Tame Impala]."

== Reception ==
The Tame Impala remix received acclaim; author Michael Gonik at Okayplayer suggested "Tame Impala's variation has proven to have just as much staying power as the original." Collin Robinson at Stereogum called Parker's iteration the standout piece from the Rogue Waves EP, while Nastassia Baroni at Music Feeds dubbed the remix a "masterpiece". Jayson Greene at Pitchfork "Tame Impala are an irresistibly remix-able rock band because they offer so much good stuff to strip out and build around—the big drum breaks, the killer bass lines, ghostly, detached vocals. [..] it's clear from his take on "Waves" that [Parker] is becoming a capital-P Producer, separate from his own project." Musgraves' reimagining also received praise. "The singer transforms "Waves" into something nocturnal and mysterious, all dimmed lights and smoke, as tinkling percussion, rumbling guitar and wisps of steel faintly echo into the distance," wrote Rolling Stone contributor Jon Freeman. Brennan Carley of Spin called it the best of the bunch: "Something about the pair trading off lines makes the already sensual song all that more resonant, and the steel guitar quivering in the background is a countrified cherry on top of the whole gorgeous arrangement."

== Charts ==
Chart (2016)	Peak position
US Hot R&B/Hip-Hop Songs (Billboard)	46
US R&B Songs (Billboard)	20

== Certifications ==
Region	Certification	Certified units/sales
Canada (Music Canada)	Gold	40,000^{‡}
New Zealand (RMNZ)	Platinum	30,000^{‡}
United States (RIAA)	Gold	500,000^{‡}
^{‡} Sales+streaming figures based on certification alone.

== Personnel ==
Musicians

- Miguel – vocals, production, songwriting
- Jack Davey – additional vocals
- Nathan Perez – songwriting

Production

- Flippa – production
- Happy Perez – production
- Manny Marroquin – mixing
- Chris Galland – mixing assistance
- Ike Schultz – mixing assistance
