= All I Want Is You (album) =

2010 album by Miguel

Studio album by Miguel
- Released: November 30, 2010
- Recorded: 2007–2008
- Genres: R&B; hip hop; neo soul
- Length: 42:47
- Labels: Black Ice; ByStorm; Jive
- Producers: Andre Harris & Vidal Davis; Fisticuffs; Happy Perez; Salaam Remi; State of Emergency

Miguel chronology
All I Want Is You (2010)	Kaleidoscope Dream (2012)

Singles from All I Want Is You
- 1. "All I Want Is You" Released: May 25, 2010; 2. "Sure Thing" Released: November 26, 2010; 3. "Quickie" Released: August 2, 2011; 4. "Girls Like You" Released: November 8, 2011

All I Want Is You is the debut studio album by American R&B singer Miguel. It was released on November 30, 2010, by Black Ice Records, ByStorm Entertainment and Jive Records.

After signing to ByStorm in 2007, Miguel recorded the album with producers Dre & Vidal, Fisticuffs, Happy Perez, State of Emergency, and Salaam Remi. It was shelved by Jive for two years after legal issues with the singer's former production company. Selling poorly upon its release, it became a sleeper hit on the Billboard 200 with the help of singles such as the title track and "Sure Thing". By September 2012, it had sold 404,000 copies.

All I Want Is You received positive reviews; critics found some of the music inconsistent but praised Miguel's singing and songwriting abilities while drawing comparisons to Prince. Miguel toured in promotion of the album as a supporting act for fellow R&B singers Usher and Trey Songz.

== Background ==
As a burgeoning songwriter, Miguel had written the R&B song "Sure Thing", which was pitched to music executive Mark Pitts as a candidate for the singer Usher's tentative album. Pitts was impressed by both "Sure Thing" and "Quickie", as well as Miguel's performance in-person, and signed him to a recording contract instead of offering the songs to Usher. "He came and performed and just had no fear. I loved him," Pitts later said of Miguel. "He was like Elvis. He was all over the place at the time, but it was just different. With a little tweaking, this could be special."

After signing in 2007 to Pitts' Jive Records-imprint label, ByStorm Entertainment, Miguel began recording his first album, All I Want Is You. Recording sessions took place at Black Mango Studios in Van Nuys, California, Germano Studios in New York City, Glenwood Studios and Instrument Zoo in Miami, Florida, Studio 609 in Philadelphia, Pennsylvania, and The Gym in Los Angeles, California.

== Music and lyrics ==
According to Jason Newman from MTV Buzzworthy, All I Want Is You is "a diverse album rooted in R&B and hip-hop, thoughtfully laced with elements of classic rock, funk and electro". Marc Hogan from Spin said it featured neo soul music, while AllMusic critic David Jeffries described it as a "slick" and "sexy" synthesis of influences from Prince, Kanye West, and electro. "Girls Like You" and "Hard Way" feature aggressive hip hop beats, while "Pay Me" and "To the Moon" explore European electronic music and EDM, respectively.

According to Tom Hull, the album is an attempt at R&B's "love man" archetype, set against "slinky, marginally funky rhythm[s]". The album's first half features two romantic songs, an interlude, a song about a prostitute, and another about a quickie. The closing track "My Piece" uses a "piece"-"peace" homonym. Jeffries said the album featured Miguel's "sly sense of humor". On "Sure Thing", Miguel sang about loyalty in a passionate committed relationship. "Girl with the Tattoo Enter.lewd" is an ethereal a cappella interlude, and was named one of the best album interludes in a list by Billboard.

== Marketing and sales ==
Though its poor initial showing on the charts seemed to affirm [Jive]'s lack of faith in it, the record gradually discovered an audience over the next year thanks to a trickle of ingratiating singles that established Miguel as one of radio’s rarest commodities: a new R&B star. With its splatters of off-kilter funk and mesmeric electro, All I Want Is You teased a unique vision without coloring too far outside the boundaries of popular R&B.

— Evan Rytlewski (The A.V. Club, 2012)

After the recording's completion, legal issues with Miguel's former production company prevented the album from being released for two years. During this period, Miguel continued working with various underground acts and writing songs for mainstream recording artists, including Johnson&Jonson, Asher Roth, Jaheim, and Usher.

ByStorm Entertainment and Jive eventually released the album on November 30, 2010. It sold poorly at first, with first-week sales of 11,000 copies and a chart debut of number 109 on the Billboard 200. After falling off the chart for three weeks, it re-entered and climbed the Billboard 200 for 22 weeks, before peaking at number 37 on May 14, 2011. The album became a sleeper hit, and by September 2012, it had sold 404,000 copies, according to Nielsen SoundScan. The album has been certified platinum by the Recording Industry Association of America (RIAA).

According to Miguel, Jive marketed him as a "typical R&B artist" during their promotion of All I Want Is You: "That album was a huge learning experience. I left the marketing of my album and me as an artist up to the discretion of the label ... I can't really blame them for [that], because that's what they know. But that's not what my lifestyle was." Four singles were released from the album: the title track "All I Want Is You", "Sure Thing", "Quickie", and "Girls Like You". As the title track gradually received radio airplay, Miguel began touring as a supporting act for Usher and Trey Songz. By May 2011, "All I Want Is You" and "Sure Thing" had reached a combined digital/mobile sales of over 825,000 units.

== Critical reception ==
Professional ratings
Review scores
Source	Rating
About.com	3.5/5 stars
AllMusic	3.5/5 stars
MSN Music (Expert Witness)	B+
Slant Magazine	3.5/5 stars
Tom Hull – on the Web	B+

Reviewing for About.com in November 2010, Mark Edward Nero said Miguel "somehow managed to vocally glide across each" of the different styles he explored on All I Want Is You, which was nonetheless rooted in R&B. He deemed the record imperfect but devoid of a poor song. B. Wright from Vibe found the music inconsistent and "schizophrenic" but praised Miguel's singing and songwriting abilities while determining the record was "worth the purchase price". Slant Magazine's Matthew Cole said the second half of songs was "less stimulating" on an album that "blends slick, radio-friendly R&B with Prince-aping theatrics, both refracted around a sense of humor that, surreal and sexually unsubtle, would have to make [Prince] proud". Cole also compared Miguel to singer Kelis, "whose work has an undeniably commercial cunning to it, but who never fails to imbue her pop confections with real personality".

Writing in MSN Music a few years later, Robert Christgau said Miguel "front-loaded his Prince-channeling debut" with "five hooky tracks" that were "followed by six pleasant tracks and capped by two hooky novelties". He viewed the song "Teach Me" as "a treasure hidden in the middle" and "supplicant's" song, "unprecedented" in "a genre that makes its nut promising untold pleasures". He credited Miguel for "laying out the truth that, as Norman Mailer put it in one of the few useful sex tips in his orgasm-mad canon, 'the man as lover is dependent upon the bounty of the woman.' Who knows what pleases her? She does, she alone, and Miguel craves to be let in on that shifting and enthralling secret." He nonetheless critiqued that the song lacked a first-rate hook that would have made it an R&B classic in the vein of Marvin Gaye's "Sexual Healing" and "Use Me" by Bill Withers.

== Track listing ==
Credits are adapted from the album's liner notes.

No.	Title	Writer(s)	Producer(s)	Length
1.	"Sure Thing"	Miguel Pimentel; Nathan Perez	Happy Perez	3:14
2.	"All I Want Is You" (featuring J. Cole)	Salaam Remi; Pimentel; Jermaine Cole	Remi	4:55
3.	"Girl with the Tattoo Enter.lewd"	Pimentel		1:42
4.	"Pay Me"	Pimentel; Mac Robinson; Brian Warfield	Fisticuffs	2:57
5.	"Quickie"	Pimentel; Robinson; Warfield	Fisticuffs	3:46
6.	"Girls Like You"	Pimentel; Robinson; Warfield	Fisticuffs	3:23
7.	"Overload Enter.lewd"	Pimentel		0:31
8.	"Hard Way"	Remi; Pimentel	Remi	3:49
9.	"Teach Me"	Pimentel; Darnley Scantlebury	State of Emergency	5:22
10.	"Hero"	Pimentel; Andre Harris; Vidal Davis	Harris; Davis	3:47
11.	"Vixen"	Pimentel; Robinson; Warfield	Fisticuffs	3:01
12.	"To the Moon"	Pimentel; Harry Zelnick; Alex Chiegger; Harris; Davis	Harris; Davis	3:23
13.	"My Piece"	Pimentel; Perez	Perez	2:55
Total length:				42:47

== Personnel ==
- Raymond Angry – keyboards, strings
- Wayne Barrow – executive producer
- Anita Marisa Boriboon – art direction, design
- Alex Chiegger – instrumentation
- Tom Coyne – mastering
- Kumi Craig – grooming
- Vidal Davis – instrumentation, mixing, producer
- Daniel DeLuna – 12-string bass guitar
- Gleyder "Gee" Disla – engineer
- Vince Dlorinzo – engineer
- Ryan Evans – engineer
- Andre Harris – instrumentation, producer
- Kasey Phillips – engineer
- Erik Madrid – assistant
- Manny Marroquin – mixing
- Miguel – engineer, vocals
- Happy Perez – drums, keyboards, producer, programming
- Miguel Pimentel – executive producer
- Mark Pitts – A&R, executive producer
- Christian Plata – assistant
- Kai Regan – photography
- Salaam Remi – bass, drums, guitar
- Anthony Saleh – production coordination
- Wendell "Pops" Sewell – guitar
- State of Emergency – producer
- Steve Bruner – bass
- Tim Stewart – guitar
- Jahi Sundance – programming
- Mike Tsarfati – engineer
- Harry Zelnick – instrumentation

== Charts ==
=== Weekly charts ===
2011 weekly chart performance for All I Want Is You
Chart (2011)	Peak position
US Billboard 200	37
US Top R&B/Hip-Hop Albums (Billboard)	9

2023 weekly chart performance for All I Want Is You
Chart (2023)	Peak position
Canadian Albums (Billboard)	60
Dutch Albums (Album Top 100)	43
Lithuanian Albums (AGATA)	55
Swedish Albums (Sverigetopplistan)	44

2025 weekly chart performance for All I Want Is You
Chart (2025)	Peak position
Portuguese Albums (AFP)	167

=== Year-end charts ===
2011 year-end chart performance for All I Want Is You
Chart (2011)	Position
US Billboard 200	98
US Top R&B/Hip-Hop Albums (Billboard)	28

2012 year-end chart performance for All I Want Is You
Chart (2012)	Position
US Top R&B/Hip-Hop Albums (Billboard)	73

2023 year-end chart performance for All I Want Is You
Chart (2023)	Position
US Billboard 200	171
US Top R&B/Hip-Hop Albums (Billboard)	77

== Certifications ==
Certifications for All I Want Is You
Region	Certification	Certified units/sales
Denmark (IFPI Danmark)	Platinum	20,000^{‡}
New Zealand (RMNZ)	3× Platinum	45,000^{‡}
United Kingdom (BPI)	Silver	60,000^{‡}
United States (RIAA)	Platinum	1,000,000^{‡}
^{‡} Sales+streaming figures based on certification alone.
