= Quickie (Miguel song) =

Single by Miguel

Single by Miguel

from the album All I Want Is You
- Released: August 2, 2011
- Genre: R&B
- Length: 3:46
- Label: RCA
- Songwriters: Miguel Pimentel, Mac Robinson, Brian Warfield
- Producer: Fisticuffs

Miguel singles chronology
"Sure Thing" (2011)	"Quickie" (2011)	"Lotus Flower Bomb" (2011)

"Quickie" is a song by American recording artist Miguel. It was released as the third single from his 2010 debut album All I Want Is You, and was sent to rhythmic contemporary radio on August 2, 2011. The official remix features rapper Big Sean.

== Music and lyrics ==
"Quickie" is an R&B song, according to The New York Times critic Jon Caramanica. It features a low-tempo, reggae-accented guitar and percussion instrumental produced by Fisticuffs, accompanying the earnest sexual propositions in Miguel's lyrics.

== Charts ==
=== Weekly charts ===
Chart (2011)	Peak position
US Billboard Hot 100	62
US Hot R&B/Hip-Hop Songs (Billboard)	3
US Rhythmic Airplay (Billboard)	23

=== Year-end charts ===
Chart (2011)	Position
US Hot R&B/Hip-Hop Songs (Billboard)	26

== Certifications ==
Region	Certification	Certified units/sales
New Zealand (RMNZ)	Gold	15,000^{‡}
United States (RIAA)	Gold	500,000^{‡}
^{‡} Sales+streaming figures based on certification alone.
