= Te Lo Dije =

EP by Miguel
- Released: April 5, 2019
- Recorded: 2018
- Length: 18:33
- Language: Spanish; English
- Label: ByStorm; RCA
- Producer: Happy Perez; Miguel; Steve Mostyn; Jeff Bhasker; David Andrew Sitek

Miguel chronology
War & Leisure (2017)	Te Lo Dije (2019)	Art Dealer Chic 4 (2021)

Te Lo Dije is the first Spanish-language extended play by American recording artist Miguel, released on April 5, 2019, via ByStorm Entertainment and RCA Records. It is a reissue of Miguel's fourth album, War & Leisure, featuring five tracks from the album recorded primary in Spanish. The EP features guest appearances from C. Tangana, Flor de Toloache and Kali Uchis.

== Background ==
Months after the release of his fourth album, War & Leisure, Miguel announced that he was planning on recording a Spanish project. On April 5, 2019, the project was released as an EP instead.

== Track listing ==
No.	Title	Writer(s)	Producer(s)	Length
1.	"Criminal" (Spanish version) (featuring C. Tangana)	Miguel Pimentel; David Andrew Sitek	Sitek; Miguel	4:38
2.	"Banana Clip" (Spanish version)	Pimentel; Steve Mostyn	Miguel; Mostyn	3:21
3.	"Sky Walker" (Spanish version)	Pimentel; Nathan Perez; Rogét Chahayed	Happy Perez; Miguel	3:10
4.	"Caramelo Duro" (Spanish version) (featuring Kali Uchis)	Pimentel; Karly Loaiza; Mostyn	Mostyn; Miguel	3:36
5.	"Te Lo Dije" (Spanish version) (featuring Flor de Toloache)	Pimentel; Perez; Jeff Bhasker; Shae Fiol; Andres Ramos; Julie Acosta; Mireya Ramos	Miguel; Perez; Bhasker	3:48
Total length:				18:33

== Charts ==
Chart (2019)	Peak position
US Latin Pop Albums (Billboard)	3
US Top Latin Albums (Billboard)	11
US Latin Album Sales (Billboard)	14
