= Ludaversal =

Studio album by Ludacris
- Released: March 31, 2015
- Recorded: 2011–2015
- Genre: Hip-hop
- Length: 49:18
- Label: Disturbing tha Peace; Def Jam
- Producer: Chris "Ludacris" Bridges (exec.); Chaka Zulu (exec.); Jeff Dixon (exec.); Rico Love; Giorgio Tuinfort; Da Internz; Mike Will Made It; Frank Dukes; !llmind; Syk Sense; 1500 or Nothin'; The University; J.U.S.T.I.C.E. League; David Banner; Just Blaze; DJ Toomp; DJ Pain 1; Bigg D; Steven Q-Beatz; T-Minus; Alex da Kid; Mel & Mus

Ludacris chronology
Burning Bridges (2014)	Ludaversal (2015)

Alternative cover
- Deluxe edition artwork

Singles from Ludaversal
- 1. "Good Lovin" Released: December 15, 2014; 2. "Come & See Me" Released: March 17, 2015; 3. "Grass Is Always Greener" Released: June 13, 2015

Ludaversal is the ninth studio album by American rapper Ludacris under Disturbing tha Peace Records and Def Jam Recordings. It was released on March 31, 2015. Recording sessions took place during 2011 to 2015, while the production on the album was handled by several producers; including Mike Will Made It, Rico Love, Giorgio Tuinfort and Da Internz, among others.

== Release and promotion ==
On March 13, 2012, Ludacris announced the album, titled Ludaversal, would be released on September 11, 2012 (which is on his birthday). One of the songs, titled "Ocean Skies" originally featured vocals from singer Anita Baker. Baker's vocals were later replaced by singer Monica.

On October 9, 2014, Ludacris announced an EP, titled Burning Bridges will be released in December 2014, and then his album Ludaversal will be follow-up on March 31, 2015. On October 31, 2014, Ludacris released the lead single from his EP, titled "Good Lovin" featuring American singer Miguel.

On March 3, 2015, Ludacris held a listening party for Ludaversal with Def Jam. The tracks "Ludaversal (Intro)", "Not Long" featuring Usher and "Come N See Me" featuring Big K.R.I.T. were revealed to the public.

== Singles ==
On December 15, 2014, Ludacris released an EP, titled "Burning Bridges". The final track from the EP, titled "Good Lovin'" featuring Miguel, serves as the lead single from Ludaversal. On March 10, 2015, Ludacris released 2 pre-order tracks from the album titled: "Call Ya Bluff" and "Beast Mode". "Come & See Me" and "Grass Is Always Greener" were both later sent to urban radio to further promote the album.

== Critical reception ==
Professional ratings
Aggregate scores
Source	Rating
Metacritic	63/100
Review scores
Source	Rating
AllMusic	3.5/5 stars
Billboard	3/5 stars
Exclaim!	6/10
HipHopDX	3/5 stars
Rolling Stone	3/5 stars
XXL	(XL)

Ludaversal received generally positive reviews from music critics. At Metacritic, which assigns a normalized rating out of 100 to reviews from critics, the album received an average score of 63, which indicates "generally favorable reviews", based on 11 reviews. Darryl Robertson from XXL called the record "no different" from Ludacris' previous projects, praising his balance of "personal, comical, lyrical, inspirational and socially conscious raps" throughout the track listing, concluding that "[I]f Ludaversal is a reminder that he hasn’t fallen off lyrically, the game should pay attention." AllMusic's David Jeffries said that, "Hip-hop has a towering pile of "the game needs me" albums where an artist returns to stake their claim, but Ludaversal still feels fresh, alive, and needed, and maybe just because it comes from the unique voice that is Ludacris." Jon Dolan of Rolling Stone said of Ludacris on the album: "he's still the same elastically flowing shout-rap dirty bird — gleefully wilding out on Southern party jams like 'Get Lit' and 'Beast Mode'." In a mixed review for Exclaim!, Samantha O'Connor wrote that Ludacris finds himself in between "owning up to the voracious hunger needed to reach a new level of fulfillment and being trapped by the desperation to regain a title that is no longer his."

== Commercial performance ==
The album debuted at number 3 on the Billboard 200 with 73,000 album-equivalent units; it sold 62,000 copies in its first week, and boasted over 4.8 million streams. It was the second best-selling album of the week. It marked Ludacris's eighth top-five album. In its second week, the album fell to number 18 on the Billboard 200, selling 23,000 equivalent album units; it sold 18,000 copies and boasted over 3.4 million streams. For a two-week total, Ludaversal sold just under 82,000 copies and streamed 8 million times domestically.

== Track listing ==
Ludaversal — North American standard version
No.	Title	Writer(s)	Producer(s)	Length
1.	"Ludaversal Intro"	Christopher Bridges; Lavell Crump	David Banner	3:35
2.	"Grass is Always Greener"	Bridges; Marcos Palacios; Ernest Clark	Da Internz	3:15
3.	"Call Ya Bluff"	Bridges; Joshua Scruggs	Syk Sense	3:07
4.	"Lyrical Healing"	Bridges; Adam Feeney; Maneesh Bidaye; Ramon Ibanga, Jr.	Illmind; Frank Dukes	1:16
5.	"Beast Mode"	Bridges; Larrance Dopson; Christopher "Brody" Brown; John Wesley Groover; Michael Ray Cox, Jr.	1500 or Nothin', Mike & Keys	3:36
6.	"Viagra" (skit)	Bridges; Carla Henderson		1:44
7.	"Get Lit"	Bridges; Palacios; Clark; Ronnie Jackson	Da Internz; Lil Ronnie	3:59
8.	"Come and See Me" (interlude)	Bridges; Aldrin Davis	DJ Toomp	1:16
9.	"Come and See Me" (featuring Big K.R.I.T.)	Bridges; Justin Scott; Michael Williams II	Mike WiLL Made It	4:25
10.	"Good Lovin" (featuring Miguel)	Bridges; Miguel Pimentel; Palacios; Clark	Da Internz	3:43
11.	"Ocean Skies" (featuring Monica)	Bridges; Ian D'Sa Benjamin Kowalewicz; Crystal Nicole Johnson-Pompey; Alicia Augello-Cook	The University; J.U.S.T.I.C.E. League; Blanco “the ear	4:49
12.	"Not Long" (featuring Usher)	Bridges; Maurice Willis; Thomas Brenneck; David Guy; Leon Michels; Homer Steinweiss; Fernando Velez	Mel & Mus	4:13
13.	"Charge It to the Rap Game"	Bridges; Feeney; Bidaye; Ibanga, Jr.	Illmind	3:50
14.	"This Has Been My World"	Bridges; Justin Smith; Steve Porcaro; John Bettis	Just Blaze	6:30
Total length:				49:18

Ludaversal — North American deluxe version
No.	Title	Writer(s)	Producer(s)	Length
15.	"Money" (featuring Rick Ross)	Bridges; William Roberts II; Clarence McDonald; Lowrell Simon	DJ Pain 1	4:53
16.	"Problems" (featuring Cee Lo Green)	Bridges; Tyler Williams	T-Minus	3:59
17.	"In My Life" (featuring John Legend)	Bridges; John Stephens; Douglas Lucas; Guy Delo; Ralph Benatar	Bigg D; Steven Q-Beatz; Cainon Lamb	4:52
18.	"Burning Bridges" (featuring Jason Aldean)	Bridges; Jamie Commons; Alexander Grant	Alex da Kid	4:06
Total length:				67:08

Sample credits

- "Lyrical Healing" contains a sample from "Hubey" performed by Maneesh Bidaye.
- "Ocean Skies" contains a sample from "Diamond on a Landmine" performed by Billy Talent.
- "Not Long" contains a sample from "Tired of Fighting" performed by Menahan Street Band.
- "Charge It to the Rap Game" contains a sample from "Lonnie Blacksmith" performed by Maneesh Bidaye.
- "Money" contains a sample from "All About the Paper" performed by The Dells.
- "In My Life" contains a sample from "Changing Faces" performed by The J.J. Band.
- "This Has Been My World" contains a sample from "Human Nature" performed by Michael Jackson.

== Charts ==
=== Weekly charts ===
Weekly chart performance for Ludaversal
Chart (2015)	Peak position
Canadian Albums (Billboard)	20
UK Albums (OCC)	86
UK R&B Albums (OCC)	7
US Billboard 200	3
US Top R&B/Hip-Hop Albums (Billboard)	2

=== Year-end charts ===
Year-end chart performance for Ludaversal
Chart (2015)	Peak position
US Top R&B/Hip-Hop Albums (Billboard)	35
US Rap Albums (Billboard)	25
