= Sky Walker (song) =

Single by Miguel featuring Travis Scott

from the album War & Leisure
- Released: August 25, 2017
- Length: 4:20: 3:25 (radio edit)
- Label: ByStorm; RCA
- Songwriters: Miguel Pimentel; Jacques Webster II; Rogét Chahayed; Nathan Perez
- Producers: Miguel; Happy Perez

Miguel singles chronology
"Lost in Your Light" (2017)	"Sky Walker" (2017)	"Shockandawe" (2017)

Travis Scott singles chronology
"Know No Better" (2017)	"Sky Walker" (2017)	"4 AM" (2017)

Audio sample
- file; help

Music video
- "Sky Walker" on YouTube

"Sky Walker" is a song by American singer Miguel featuring American rapper Travis Scott. It was written by the two artists with Rogét Chahayed and Happy Perez, who produced it with Miguel. The song was released through ByStorm Entertainment and RCA Records on August 25, 2017, as the lead single from Miguel's fourth studio album, War & Leisure. A Spanish version of the song was included on his extended play Te Lo Dije (2019).

== Critical reception ==
Lauren O'Neill of Vice wrote that the song has "a super chilled-out, laid back vibe in the vein that Miguel always does best". Mikey Fresh of Vibe thinks that the song, which he described as "trippy", "takes listeners on a smoked-out voyage complete with kush clouds and outer-body experiences". Carl Lamarre of Billboard called it a "celebratory song". Jordan Sargent of Spin described the song as "light and airy". He compared the song to Miguel's previous collaboration with Scott on a remix of "Waves", and opined that "Sky Walker" is "more organic". Michelle Geslani of Consequence of Sound wrote that "the two recapture the lushness of" the "Waves" remix. Mitch Findlay of HotNewHipHop regarded the song as "a solid blend of party track and introspective banger". Joshua Espinoza of Pigeons and Planes wrote that the song is "everything you'd expect from a Miguel record: Smooth and airy with an infectious beat that can easily be bumped in a club". Michael Cuby of Paper called it an "oddly perky song", and wrote that "the whole thing is quintessential end-of-the-summer BBQ vibes". Ryan Reed of Rolling Stone named it "a synth-driven new single" and wrote that it has "a trap-leaning beat, accented with splashes of color from a delayed electric guitar".

== Commercial performance ==
"Sky Walker" is Miguel's third-highest-charting single as a lead artist, on the Billboard Hot 100, only behind 2010's "Sure Thing" and 2012's "Adorn". It is his fifth-highest-charting single as a lead artist on the Billboard Hot R&B/Hip-Hop Songs chart.

== Music video ==
The accompanying music video was directed by Director X and Miguel. It shows Miguel in various locations such as a sauna, a basketball court, and a cockpit, as he parties inside the mansion, doing activities like surfing, "pouring out shots, stacking cups on a passed out friend's head, pretending to be a matador" and taking pictures in a bedroom. It also features both Miguel and Scott performing part of the song on top of a Toronto Police Services Ford Interceptor Sedan.

== Track listing ==
- Digital download
1. "Sky Walker" (featuring Travis Scott) – 4:20
- Digital download – Spanish version
1. "Sky Walker" (Spanish version) – 3:10

== Credits and personnel ==
Credits adapted from Tidal.

- Miguel – songwriting, production, engineering, programming
- Travis Scott – songwriting
- Happy Perez – songwriting, production, keyboard, guitar, programming
- Rogét Chahayed – songwriting, keyboard, programming
- David Davis – mixer, engineer
- Bo Bodnar – assistant engineering

== Charts ==
=== Weekly charts ===
Chart (2017–2018)	Peak position
Canada Hot 100 (Billboard)	87
New Zealand Heatseekers (RMNZ)	5
US Billboard Hot 100	29
US Hot R&B/Hip-Hop Songs (Billboard)	14
US Pop Airplay (Billboard)	39
US Rhythmic Airplay (Billboard)	1

=== Year-end charts ===
Chart (2018)	Position
US Billboard Hot 100	75
US Hot R&B/Hip-Hop Songs (Billboard)	47
US Rhythmic (Billboard)	22

== Certifications ==
Region	Certification	Certified units/sales
Canada (Music Canada)	2× Platinum	160,000^{‡}
Denmark (IFPI Danmark)	Gold	45,000^{‡}
New Zealand (RMNZ)	4× Platinum	120,000^{‡}
United Kingdom (BPI)	Gold	400,000^{‡}
United States (RIAA)	3× Platinum	3,000,000^{‡}
^{‡} Sales+streaming figures based on certification alone.
