= Wildheart (album) =

Studio album by Miguel
- Released: June 29, 2015
- Studios: Blakeslee Recording Company (North Hollywood); The Doogh (London); Fisticuffs Gym (Los Angeles); The Lair (Los Angeles); MJP (Los Angeles); The Village (West Los Angeles)
- Genres: R&B; rock; neo soul; new wave; psychedelic rock; progressive soul
- Length: 46:25
- Labels: Black Ice; ByStorm; RCA
- Producers: A. K. Paul; Benny Blanco; Benny Cassette; Brook D'Leau; Cashmere Cat; Fisticuffs; Flippa; Happy Perez; Miguel; Oakwud; Pop Wansel; Salaam Remi; Steve Mostyn

Miguel chronology
Kaleidoscope Dream (2012)	Wildheart (2015)	War & Leisure (2017)

Singles from Wildheart
- 1. "Coffee" Released: May 4, 2015

Wildheart is the third studio album by American R&B singer Miguel. It was released on June 29, 2015, by Black Ice Records, ByStorm Entertainment, and RCA Records.

The album was produced by Miguel with Benny Cassette, Cashmere Cat, Benny Blanco, and Salaam Remi, among others. Certain songs found him collaborating with fellow singer Lenny Kravitz and rapper Kurupt. The music departed further from Miguel's R&B roots with rock styles such as psychedelic and new wave, as well as lyrical themes that explore morality, normalcy, and sexuality.

Wildheart charted at number two on the Billboard 200 while selling 40,000 copies in its first week. It was a widespread critical success and earned Miguel two Grammy Award nominations, including one in the category of Best Urban Contemporary Album.

== Background ==
In an interview with MTV, RCA Records executive Mark Pitts discussed Miguel's recording of Wildheart. "He's more confident, and it's going to show in the music, his look and in the videos", Pitts said. "Miguel is ready to push the button. His first album was about trials and tribulations. The second was OK, we’re here; I wasn't bugging. And now it's here we go. He wants people to understand who he is. He's tired of people asking who are you, what's that, 'do you like girls?' He tells me, 'I want everyone to know I am wild, funny, edgy and love women. I need this album to connect'".

== Music and lyrics ==
Throughout [Wildheart], Miguel comes off as a seeker lost in a world where dreams, religion, sex and art are tangled up with their own dark, addictive mirror images.

— Rolling Stone

According to AllMusic's Andy Kellman, Wildheart's music is defined less by melody than by the presence of "grinding guitars and mechanical beats", played in the style of contemporary R&B and new wave rock. The Music magazine deems it an exploration into progressive soul, while Sheldon Pearce from Consequence says the album's neo soul music ranges from "psychedelic to interstellar" sounds and defies the "traditional sensibilities in modern R&B".

According to Robert Christgau, Wildheart shares more with rock music's recurring theme of struggles with normalcy and human contradiction than it does with R&B's "sin-versus-salvation struggles". Jon Pareles from The New York Times says the alluring but amoral environment of California is a recurring setting throughout the record, which explores Miguel's "clashing impulses further" than Kaleidoscope Dream (2012), "toward love and death, raunch and exaltation, doubt and confidence, salvation and damnation, cynicism and hope"; "Gonna Die Young" was written about the dangers of leading a risky lifestyle, while "...Goingtohell" explores themes of human mortality and romance. Sex-themed songs range from the wholesome narrative of "Coffee" to the pornographic "The Valley", which makes reference to the San Fernando Valley's adult entertainment industry. According to Pareles, the rock ballad "What's Normal Anyway" serves as the crux of Wildheart, as it finds Miguel contemplating his biracial heritage and feeling of rootlessness, while Christgau surmises that the song's "straightforwardly confused" lyrics properly outline Miguel's character: "He is normal—because he ain't."

== Marketing and sales ==
In 2014, Miguel released an EP, titled Wild, in promotion of Wildheart, featuring the songs "NWA", "Hollywood Dreams", and "Coffee". The lead single from the album was a re-worked version of the EP's track "Coffee", renamed as "Coffee (Fucking)", featuring guest vocals from American rapper Wale; it was released on May 4, 2015. Wildheart was released on June 29 by RCA Records and ByStorm Entertainment. In its first week, the album debuted at number two on the Billboard 200 and sold 40,000 copies in the United States.

== Critical reception ==
Wildheart ratings
Aggregate scores
Source	Rating
AnyDecentMusic?	7.6/10
Metacritic	84/100
Review scores
Source	Rating
AllMusic	4/5 stars
The A.V. Club	B
The Daily Telegraph	5/5 stars
Entertainment Weekly	A−
The Guardian	4/5 stars
NME	8/10
Pitchfork	8.9/10
Rolling Stone	4/5 stars
Spin	8/10
Vice (Expert Witness)	A−

Wildheart was met with widespread critical acclaim. At Metacritic, which assigns a normalized rating out of 100 to reviews from mainstream publications, the album received an average score of 84, based on 27 reviews. Aggregator AnyDecentMusic? gave it 7.6 out of 10, based on their assessment of the critical consensus.

Reviewing the album for Rolling Stone, Will Hermes found it "even bolder" sonically than Kaleidoscope Dream, while Q deemed Miguel's take on R&B and rock "quixotic". In Entertainment Weekly, Kyle Anderson called Miguel's lyrics about romance and thrill in Los Angeles both exciting and balanced, while Pitchfork's Anupa Mistry felt he had improved his songwriting with a sex-positive perspective that was distinct from the lustfulness of most other R&B music: "Languorous and detailed, it transcends the genre's established narratives with a focus on pleasure and partnership instead of one-sided pursuit". Jesse Cataldo of Slant Magazine compared it to D'Angelo's socially conscious album Black Messiah (2014), finding Wildheart to be "just as relevant, acknowledging the complicated realities of modern sexuality while pushing to expand its horizons". In a less enthusiastic review, NME critic Ben Cardew lamented some of the guitar elements, writing that they occasionally sounded heavy handed in the manner of arena rock. Kyle Fowle from The A.V. Club deemed "Face the Sun" a failed attempt at rock and "What's Normal Anyway" too blunt of a "self-love message" amidst the more subtle songs, while Spin's Andrew Unterberger found the album somewhat inferior to Kaleidoscope Dream, even though he said it broadened that record's musical variety.

At the end of 2015, Wildheart was named the year's best album by Time magazine. On other year-end lists, it was ranked 11th best by The Guardian, 8th best by Pitchfork, and 28th best by Rolling Stone, who said it was both one of 2015's best R&B and psychedelic rock albums. Wildheart was also nominated for the 2016 Grammy Award for Best Urban Contemporary Album, while "Coffee" was nominated in the category of Best R&B Song.

== Track listing ==
Wildheart standard edition
No.	Title	Writer(s)	Producer(s)	Length
1.	"A Beautiful Exit"	Miguel Pimentel; Nathan Perez	Miguel; Happy Perez	3:04
2.	"Deal"	Pimentel; Warren Felder; Andrew Wansel; Steve Mostyn; Ronald Colson	Oakwud; Mostyn; Pop Wansel; Flippa; Miguel	4:17
3.	"The Valley"	Pimentel; Brian Warfield; Maclean Robinson	Miguel; Fisticuffs	3:05
4.	"Coffee"	Pimentel; Brook Davis	Miguel	4:46
5.	"NWA" (featuring Kurupt)	Pimentel; Ricardo Brown; Benedetto Rotondi	Miguel; Benny Cassette	3:34
6.	"Waves"	Pimentel; Perez	Miguel; Happy Perez	3:22
7.	"What's Normal Anyway"	Pimentel; Felder; Mostyn; Colson	Oakwud; Mostyn; Flippa	3:13
8.	"Hollywood Dreams"	Pimentel; Warfield; Robinson	Miguel; Fisticuffs	3:16
9.	"Destinado a Morir (Enter.lewd)"	Pimentel	Miguel	1:19
10.	"...Goingtohell"	Pimentel; Benjamin Levin; Magnus Høiberg; Ronald Kelly; Andrew DeCaro; Jayme David Silverstein; Zac Rae	Miguel; Benny Blanco; Cashmere Cat	4:04
11.	"Flesh"	Pimentel; Raphael Saadiq; A. K. Paul	Miguel; Paul; Saadiq^{[a]}	4:29
12.	"Leaves"	Pimentel; Felder; Wansel; Mostyn; Colson; William Corgan	Oakwud; Mostyn; Pop Wansel; Flippa	3:22
13.	"Face the Sun" (featuring Lenny Kravitz)	Pimentel; Salaam Remi	Remi	4:32
Total length:				46:25

Deluxe edition (bonus tracks)
No.	Title	Writer(s)	Producer(s)	Length
9.	"...Goingtohell"	Pimentel; Levin; Høiberg; Kelly; DeCaro; Silverstein; Rae	Miguel; Benny Blanco; Cashmere Cat	4:04
10.	"Flesh"	Pimentel; Saadiq; Paul	Miguel; Paul; Saadiq^{[a]}	4:29
11.	"Leaves"	Pimentel; Felder; Wansel; Mostyn; Colson; Corgan	Oakwud; Mostyn; Pop Wansel; Flippa	3:22
12.	"Face the Sun" (featuring Lenny Kravitz)	Pimentel; Remi	Remi	4:32
13.	"GFG"	Pimentel; Davis; Brianna Cartwright	Miguel; Brook D'Leau^{[a]}	3:39
14.	"Destinado a Morir"	Pimentel	Miguel	3:01
15.	"Simple Things"	Pimentel; Davis	Miguel; Brook D'Leau	3:16
16.	"Damned"	Pimentel; Kelly; DeCaro; Silverstein; Rae	Miguel	3:26
Total length:				59:47

Japanese bonus track
No.	Title	Writer(s)	Producer(s)	Length
17.	"Coffee (Fucking)" (featuring Wale)	Pimentel; Davis; Olubowale Akintimehin	Miguel	5:13

Notes

- ^{^[a]} signifies a co-producer
- "Deal", "NWA" and "Flesh" are stylized in all upper-case letters. All other tracks, except "Hollywood Dreams" and "Simple Things", are stylized in all lower-case letters.
- "Leaves" contains a portion of the composition "1979", written by William Corgan, as performed by the Smashing Pumpkins.

== Personnel ==
Credits are adapted from AllMusic.

- Wayne Barrow – associate producer
- Jasmine Benjamin – vocals
- Benny Blanco – producer
- Tanisha Broadwater – production coordination
- Cashmere Cat – producer
- Benny Cassette – producer
- Ronald "Flippa" Colson – producer
- Tom Coyne – mastering
- Jack Davey – vocals
- Dru DeCaro – guitar
- Gleyder "Gee" Disla – engineer
- Brook D'Leau – programming, vocals
- Fisticuffs – engineer, producer
- Chris Galland – mixing assistant
- Erwin Gorostiza – creative director
- Katya Elise Henry – model
- R.J. Kelly – drums
- Lenny Kravitz – featured artist, guitar
- Kurupt – featured artist
- Nazanin Mandi – vocals
- Manny Marroquin – mixing
- Jennifer Martinez – model
- Donnie Meadows – production coordination
- Miguel – drum programming, engineer, executive producer, guitar, primary artist, producer
- Steve Mostyn – producer
- Nonchanlant Savant – vocals
- Oakwud – producer
- A. K. Paul – producer
- Happy Perez – producer
- Willo Perron – creative director
- Mark Pitts – executive producer
- Christian Plata – engineer, mixing
- Zac Rae – keyboards
- Salaam Remi – arranger, bass, drums, keyboards, producer
- Brian Roettinger – art direction
- Steve Rusch – engineer
- Raphael Saadiq – bass, guitar, piano, producer, vibraphone
- Daniel Sannwald – photography
- Ike Schultz – mixing assistant
- Jayme Silverstein – bass
- Pop Wansel – producer

== Charts ==
=== Weekly charts ===
Chart performance for Wildheart
Chart (2015)	Peak position
Australian Albums (ARIA)	8
Canadian Albums (Billboard)	10
Dutch Albums (Album Top 100)	88
New Zealand Albums (RMNZ)	16
Swiss Albums (Schweizer Hitparade)	93
UK Albums (Official Charts)	31
US Billboard 200	2
US Top R&B/Hip-Hop Albums (Billboard)	2

=== Year-end charts ===
2015 year-end chart performance for Wildheart
Chart (2015)	Position
US Billboard 200	173
US Top R&B/Hip-Hop Albums (Billboard)	29

== Certifications ==
Certifications for Wildheart
Region	Certification	Certified units/sales
New Zealand (RMNZ)	Gold	7,500^{‡}
^{‡} Sales+streaming figures based on certification alone.

== See also ==
- List of number-one albums of 2015 (Canada)
- List of Billboard number-one R&B/hip-hop albums of 2015
