= Coffee (Miguel song) =

Single by Miguel featuring Wale

from the album Wildheart
- Released: May 4, 2015
- Recorded: 2014
- Length: 4:46: 5:16 (with Wale); 3:26 (radio edit with or without Wale)
- Label: ByStorm; RCA
- Songwriters: Ulysses Nardin; Keshia Campbell Jackson; Miguel Pimentel; Olubowale Akintimehin
- Producer: Miguel

Miguel singles chronology
"Good Lovin" (2014)	"Coffee" (2015)	"Everyday" (2015)

Wale singles chronology
"The Matrimony" (2015)	"Coffee" (2015)	"My PYT" (2016)

Music video
- "Coffee" on YouTube

"Coffee" (also titled "Coffee (Fucking)") is a song by American singer Miguel, featuring vocals from fellow American rapper Wale, taken from his third studio album Wildheart (2015). It was released on May 4, 2015 by ByStorm Entertainment and RCA Records as the album's lead single from the album.

== Background ==
The song was leaked online in December 2014, and it was featured on his mixtape Wild.

== Critical reception ==
"Coffee" received critical acclaim from music critics. The song was chosen upon release as Pitchfork Media's "Best New Track". Meaghan Garvey stated that "in an age where our R&B heroes proclaim their lack of emotions a little too loudly, "Coffee" presents intimacy as infinitely bad-ass: A cold flame, the thrill of no shame." Rolling Stone ranked "Coffee" at number 27 on its year-end list to find the 50 best songs of 2015.

== Music video ==
A music video for the song was released on June 16, 2015. The original version was used to make the video instead of the extended version.

== Track listings ==
- Digital download
1. "Coffee" - 4:50
- Digital download (Extended version)
1. "Coffee (Fucking)" (featuring Wale) - 5:14

== Charts ==
Chart (2015)	Peak position
Australia (ARIA)	78
Belgium (Ultratip Bubbling Under Flanders)	69
Sweden Heatseeker (Sverigetopplistan)	16
UK Singles (Official Charts)	97
US Billboard Hot 100	78
US Hot R&B/Hip-Hop Songs (Billboard)	28

== Certifications ==
Region	Certification	Certified units/sales
Australia (ARIA)	Gold	35,000^{‡}
Canada (Music Canada)	Gold	40,000^{‡}
New Zealand (RMNZ)	Platinum	30,000^{‡}
United Kingdom (BPI)	Silver	200,000^{‡}
United States (RIAA)	Platinum	1,000,000^{‡}
^{‡} Sales+streaming figures based on certification alone.
