= Sure Thing (Miguel song) =

- Sped Up single cover

Single by Miguel

from the album All I Want Is You
- Released: November 26, 2010; February 28, 2023 (re-released)
- Recorded: 2007
- Genre: R&B; neo soul
- Length: 3:13 (album version); 2:30 (Sped Up version)
- Label: Jive
- Songwriters: Miguel Pimentel; Nathan Perez
- Producer: Happy Perez

Miguel singles chronology
"All I Want Is You" (2010)	"Sure Thing" (2010)	"Quickie" (2011)

Music video
- "Sure Thing" on YouTube

"Sure Thing" is a song by the American singer and songwriter Miguel. Produced by Happy Perez, the song is included on his debut album, All I Want Is You (2010). It was first posted onto YouTube in 2007, via Myspace. It was sent to radio as the album's second single in January 2011. The R&B song features neo soul influences, and had been noted for its similarities to the work of singer Jon B.

It initially achieved moderate success on the US Billboard Hot 100, reaching number 36 on the chart. It also reached number one on the US R&B chart, and spent more than fifty total weeks on the chart. "Sure Thing" marked Miguel's first number one hit on the Billboard Hot R&B/Hip-Hop Songs chart and it was his most successful single until the release of "Adorn" in 2012. As of July 2013, the song had sold 1,106,000 copies in the United States.

Following a resurgence in streaming due to it going viral on TikTok over a decade after its initial release, the song began to re chart worldwide, and it reached new peaks in several countries, including the United Kingdom, where it reached number four, becoming Miguel's first top ten hit in the region. Furthermore, it was reissued to US radio in February 2023 and also re entered the Billboard Hot 100, eventually reaching a new peak of number 11 and becoming his first number one hit on the US Pop Airplay chart.

== Music and lyrics ==
Lyrically, Miguel uses analogies to express his love interest, such as "You are the chalk / And I could be your blackboard" and "If I'm the lyric baby / You could be the note". Sheet music for the song shows the key of F♯ minor (F♯m).

== Music video ==
The music video premiered on January 5, 2011, was directed by Hype Williams and was shot in Honolulu, Hawaii.

== Remix ==
The official remix features rapper Pusha T.

Lil Wayne released a remix of the single on his Sorry 4 the Wait mixtape on July 13, 2011.

== Charts ==
=== Weekly charts ===
2011–2012 weekly chart performance for "Sure Thing"
Chart (2011–2012)	Peak position
US Billboard Hot 100	36
US Adult R&B Songs (Billboard)	7
US Hot R&B/Hip-Hop Songs (Billboard)	1
US Rhythmic Airplay (Billboard)	14

2022–2026 weekly chart performance for "Sure Thing"
Chart (2022–2023)	Peak position
Australia (ARIA)	6
Austria (Ö3 Austria Top 40)	14
Canada Hot 100 (Billboard)	15
Canada CHR/Top 40 (Billboard)	2
Czech Republic Singles Digital (ČNS IFPI)	20
Denmark (Tracklisten)	29
France (SNEP)	66
Germany (GfK)	22
Global 200 (Billboard)	13
Hungary (Single Top 40)	24
Iceland (Tónlistinn)	11
Ireland (IRMA)	6
Latvia (LAIPA)	4
Lithuania (AGATA)	8
Netherlands (Single Top 100)	46
New Zealand (Recorded Music NZ)	4
Norway (VG-lista)	14
Philippines (Billboard)	12
Philippines (Billboard Philippines Hot 100)	37
Philippines (Billboard Top Philippine Songs)	19
Poland (Polish Streaming Top 100)	20
Portugal (AFP)	17
Singapore (RIAS)	26
Slovakia Singles Digital (ČNS IFPI)	15
South Africa (Billboard)	13
Sweden (Sverigetopplistan)	17
Switzerland (Schweizer Hitparade)	10
UK Singles (Official Charts)	4
UK Hip Hop/R&B (Official Charts)	2
US Billboard Hot 100	11
US Adult Pop Airplay (Billboard)	14
US Pop Airplay (Billboard)	1

=== Year-end charts ===
2011 year-end chart performance for "Sure Thing"
Chart (2011)	Position
US Billboard Hot 100	92
US Hot R&B/Hip-Hop Songs (Billboard)	1
US Rhythmic (Billboard)	48

2012 year-end chart performance for "Sure Thing"
Chart (2012)	Position
US Hot R&B/Hip-Hop Songs (Billboard)	88

2023 year-end chart performance for "Sure Thing"
Chart (2023)	Position
Australia (ARIA)	21
Canada (Canadian Hot 100)	25
Germany (Official German Charts)	100
Global 200 (Billboard)	33
New Zealand (Recorded Music NZ)	4
Sweden (Sverigetopplistan)	92
Switzerland (Schweizer Hitparade)	62
UK Singles (OCC)	12
US Billboard Hot 100	24
US Adult Top 40 (Billboard)	45
US Hot R&B/Hip-Hop Songs (Billboard)	7
US Mainstream Top 40 (Billboard)	5
US Rhythmic (Billboard)	44

2024 year-end chart performance for "Sure Thing"
Chart (2024)	Position
Global 200 (Billboard)	159

=== Decade-end charts ===
Decade-end chart performance for "Sure Thing"
Chart (2010–2019)	Position
US Hot R&B/Hip-Hop Songs (Billboard)	16

== Certifications ==
Certifications for "Sure Thing"
Region	Certification	Certified units/sales
Australia (ARIA)	8× Platinum	560,000^{‡}
Denmark (IFPI Danmark)	2× Platinum	180,000^{‡}
Germany (BVMI)	Gold	150,000^{‡}
Italy (FIMI)	Gold	50,000^{‡}
New Zealand (RMNZ)	10× Platinum	300,000^{‡}
Portugal (AFP)	3× Platinum	30,000^{‡}
Spain (Promusicae)	Gold	30,000^{‡}
United Kingdom (BPI)	3× Platinum	1,800,000^{‡}
United States (RIAA)	3× Platinum	3,000,000^{‡}
Streaming
Greece (IFPI Greece)	Gold	1,000,000^{†}
^{‡} Sales+streaming figures based on certification alone.^{†} Streaming-only figures based on certification alone.

== Release history ==
Release history and formats for "Sure Thing"
Country	Date	Format	Label
United States	January 17, 2011	Urban contemporary radio	Jive
United States	February 28, 2023	Contemporary hit radio	RCA
