= War & Leisure =

Studio album by Miguel
- Released: December 1, 2017
- Studio: EastWest, Los Angeles; Record Plant, Los Angeles; Serenity West, Los Angeles; Village, Los Angeles; Blakeslee Recording Company, North Hollywood; John Hill Studio, Venice, California; Instrument Zoo, Miami; Lust, Vancouver; Platinum Sound Recording, New York City; Weekender, Amsterdam
- Genre: R&B; psychedelic funk; pop
- Length: 48:02
- Language: English; Spanish
- Label: ByStorm; RCA
- Producer: Miguel; Arden "Keyz" Altino; Jeff Bhasker; Detail; Jerry "Wonda" Duplessis; Eyal Federman; Steve Mostyn; Happy Perez; Salaam Remi; Raphael Saadiq; Sir Dylan; David Andrew Sitek; Sidney Swift

Miguel chronology
Wildheart (2015)	War & Leisure (2017)	Te Lo Dije (2019)

Singles from War & Leisure
- 1. "Sky Walker" Released: August 24, 2017; 2. "Told You So" Released: November 3, 2017; 3. "Come Through and Chill" Released: April 10, 2018

War & Leisure is the fourth studio album by American singer Miguel, released on December 1, 2017, through RCA Records. The album was preceded by the release of the first single: "Sky Walker" featuring Travis Scott. The album features further guest appearances from Rick Ross, Quiñ, Kali Uchis, J. Cole and Salaam Remi, with production led by Miguel himself, alongside a variety of contributors including Happy Perez, Steve Mostyn, David Andrew Sitek, Detail, Raphael Saadiq, Jeff Bhasker, Jerry "Wonda" Duplessis and Salaam Remi, among others.

== Background ==
He describes the album as having "political undertones, because that’s what life feels like right now". He also announced that a Spanish version of the album is in the works.

== Release and promotion ==
An early version of the song "Come Through and Chill" was uploaded to Miguel's SoundCloud page on June 23, 2016. It did not feature vocals by J. Cole, but ended up on the final version.

The album's lead single, "Sky Walker", featuring American rapper Travis Scott was released on August 24, 2017. The song charted at number 29 on the Billboard Hot 100, making it Miguel's second-highest-charting single as a lead artist since 2012's "Adorn". The song was certified platinum by the Recording Industry Association of America (RIAA). It was also certified gold by Music Canada (MC), becoming Miguel's first certified single in that country.

"Told You So", was released on November 3, 2017, as the second single from the album.

Miguel partnered with Revolve Impact and headlined in Schools Not Prisons, along with other partners in late 2017 to spread awareness of the overuse of mass incarceration in California. Footage from his Adelanto stop was used in the music video for "Now". He premiered medleys of "Criminal", "City of Angels", and "Now" on the tour.

=== Promotional singles ===
The track "Pineapple Skies" was released on November 17, 2017, as a promotional single from the album.

== Critical reception ==
Professional ratings
Aggregate scores
Source	Rating
AnyDecentMusic?	7.6/10
Metacritic	81/100
Review scores
Source	Rating
AllMusic	4/5 stars
The A.V. Club	B+
Consequence of Sound	B+
Exclaim!	8/10
The Guardian	4/5 stars
The Irish Times	4/5 stars
NME	4/5 stars
Pitchfork	8.1/10
Rolling Stone	3.5/5 stars
Slant Magazine	4/5 stars

War & Leisure was met with widespread critical acclaim. At Metacritic, which assigns a normalised rating out of 100 to reviews from mainstream critics, the album has an average score of 81 based on 19 reviews. Reviewing for The Observer, Kitty Empire noted the record's musical daring and scope, while writing that "Miguel's versatility and sureness of touch recall that of [Michael] Jackson in his pomp". Robert Christgau was less enthusiastic in his capsule-review column for Vice, citing "City of Angels" and "Sky Walker" as highlights while finding the album overall to be "more leisurely than the title might make you hope, believe, or fear".

== Commercial performance ==
War & Leisure debuted at number nine on the US Billboard 200 and topped the Billboard US Top R&B/Hip-Hop Albums chart with sales 40,000 album-equivalent units in its first week of release. On January 24, 2019, the album was certified gold by the Recording Industry Association of America (RIAA) for combined sales and album-equivalent units of 500,000 units in the United States.

== Track listing ==
War & Leisure
No.	Title	Writer(s)	Producer(s)	Length
1.	"Criminal" (featuring Rick Ross)	Miguel Pimentel; William Roberts II; David Sitek	Sitek; Miguel	4:34
2.	"Pineapple Skies"	Pimentel; Noel Fisher; Sidney Swift; Eyal Federman; Salaam Remi; Marvin Gaye; David Ritz; Odell Brown	Detail; Sidney Swift; Remi^{[a]}; Federman^{[a]}	4:41
3.	"Sky Walker" (featuring Travis Scott)	Pimentel; Jacques Webster II; Rogét Chahayed; Nathan Perez	Miguel; Happy Perez	4:19
4.	"Banana Clip"	Pimentel; Steve Mostyn	Miguel; Mostyn	3:21
5.	"Wolf" (featuring Quiñ)	Pimentel; Raphael Saadiq; Dylan Wiggins	Saadiq; Sir Dylan^{[b]}	3:29
6.	"Harem"	Pimentel; Perez	Perez; Miguel	3:13
7.	"Told You So"	Pimentel; Perez; Jeff Bhasker	Miguel; Perez; Bhasker	3:10
8.	"City of Angels"	Pimentel; Perez	Perez; Miguel	4:18
9.	"Caramelo Duro" (featuring Kali Uchis)	Pimentel; Karly Loaiza; Mostyn	Mostyn; Miguel	3:33
10.	"Come Through and Chill" (featuring J. Cole and Salaam Remi)	Pimentel; Jermaine Cole; Remi; James Yancey	Remi	5:22
11.	"Anointed"	Pimentel; Jerry "Wonda" Duplessis; Arden "Keyz" Altino; Bernard Grobman	Wonda; Keyz^{[a]}	3:53
12.	"Now"	Pimentel; Perez; Charles Thompson	Miguel; Perez	4:09
Total length:				48:02

Notes

- ^{^[a]} signifies a co-producer.
- ^{^[b]} signifies an additional producer.

Sample credits

- "Pineapple Skies" contains a portion of the composition "Sexual Healing", written by Marvin Gaye, David Ritz and Odell Brown.
- "Come Through and Chill" contains interpolations from "Crushin'", written by James Yancey.
- "Now" contains interpolations from "Where Is My Mind?", written by Charles Thompson.

== Personnel ==
Musicians

- Miguel – lead artist
- Rick Ross – featured artist (track 1)
- Travis Scott – featured artist (track 3)
- Quiñ – featured artist (track 5)
- Kali Uchis – featured artist (track 9), background vocals (track 9)
- J. Cole – featured artist (track 10)
- Salaam Remi – featured artist (track 10)

Technical

- Miguel – production (tracks 1, 3, 4, 6–9, 12), instrumentation (tracks 1, 3–8, 11, 12), programming (tracks 3, 6–8, 12), guitar (tracks 6, 7, 10, 12), keyboards (track 7), engineering (track 11)
- Salaam Remi – production (track 10), co-production (track 2), bass (track 10), drums (track 10), keyboards (track 10)
- David Andrew Sitek – production (track 1), instrumentation (track 1)
- Noel "Detail" Fisher – production (track 2), engineering (track 2)
- Happy Perez – production (tracks 3, 6–8, 12), instrumentation (tracks 3, 6–8, 12), programming (tracks 3, 6–8, 12), guitar (tracks 3, 6–8, 12), keyboards (tracks 3, 7)
- Steve Mostyn – production (tracks 4, 9), instrumentation (track 4)
- Raphael Saadiq – production (track 5), instrumentation (track 5)
- Jeff Bhasker – production (track 7), instrumentation (track 7), programming (track 7), guitar (track 7), keyboards (track 7)
- Jerry "Wonda" Duplessis – production (track 11), instrumentation (track 11)
- Sidney Swift – co-production (track 2)
- Arden "Keyz" Altino – co-production (track 11), keyboards (track 11)
- Eyal Federman – co-production (track 2)
- Sir Dylan – additional production (track 5), instrumentation (track 5)
- David Davis – bass programming (track 1), drums (track 6), additional guitars (track 12), engineering (tracks 1–4, 6, 7, 9, 12), additional engineering (track 5, 11), mixing (track 1, 3, 4, 6, 12)
- Rogét Chahayed – instrumentation (track 3), keyboards (track 3)
- Ronald "RJ" Kelly – drums (track 4)
- Bobby Avila – additional instrumentation (track 4)
- Izzy Avila – additional instrumentation (track 4)
- Jayme Silverstein – bass (track 7)
- Bernard Grobman – additional guitar (track 11)
- Brandyn Porter – additional guitar (track 11)
- Gleyder "Gee" Disla – engineering (tracks 2, 10), mixing (track 10)
- Hotae Alexander Jang – engineering (track 5)
- Alex Williams – engineering (track 8)
- Serge Tsai – engineering (track 11)
- Bo Bodnar – engineering assistance (tracks 1–3, 6, 7, 12)
- Chad Gordon – engineering assistance (tracks 1–3)
- Cousin – engineering assistance (track 1)
- Joshua Adams – engineering assistance (track 2)
- Roberto Moreno – engineering assistance (track 4), mixing assistance (track 12)
- Chaz Sexton – engineering assistance (track 6)
- William Delaney VI – engineering assistance (tracks 7, 12)
- Michael Peterson – engineering assistance (tracks 9, 12), mixing assistance (tracks 1, 3, 4, 6)
- Jaycen Joshua – mixing (track 2)
- Bobby Campbell – mixing (tracks 5, 11)
- Mark "Spike" Stent – mixing (track 7)
- Christian Plata – mixing (tracks 8, 9)
- Gerry Brown – mixing (track 11)
- David Nakaji – mixing assistance (track 2)
- Ben Milchev – mixing assistance (track 2)
- Scott Moore – mixing assistance (track 5)
- Michael Freeman – mixing assistance (track 7)
- Geoff Swan – mixing assistance (track 7)
- Joseph Valdovinos – mixing assistance (tracks 8, 9)
- Wesley Seidman – mixing assistance (track 11)
- Casey Cuayo – mixing assistance (track 11)
- Wayne Barrow – associate production
- Mike Bozzi – mastering
- Randy Merrill – mastering (track 3)

Miscellaneous

- Miguel – A&R, executive production
- Mark Pitts – A&R, executive production
- Leticia Hilliard – A&R coordination
- Jordan Feldstein – management
- Elena Awbrey – management
- Erwin Gorostiza – creative direction (RCA)
- Brian Roettinger – art direction, design
- Timothy Saccenti – photography
- Van Van Alonso – styling
- Nadia Mohammadpour – grooming
- Heath Mattioli – set design
- Annee Elliot – shoot production

== Charts ==
=== Weekly charts ===
Chart (2017)	Peak position
Australian Albums (ARIA)	44
Canadian Albums (Billboard)	28
Dutch Albums (Album Top 100)	74
Latvian Albums (LaIPA)	64
New Zealand Albums (RMNZ)	24
UK Albums (OCC)	92
US Billboard 200	9
US Top R&B/Hip-Hop Albums (Billboard)	1

=== Year-end charts ===
Chart (2018)	Position
US Billboard 200	117
US Top R&B/Hip-Hop Albums (Billboard)	56

== Certifications ==
Region	Certification	Certified units/sales
New Zealand (RMNZ)	Platinum	15,000^{‡}
United States (RIAA)	Gold	500,000^{‡}
^{‡} Sales+streaming figures based on certification alone.
