= Miguel (singer) =

American singer-songwriter (born 1985)

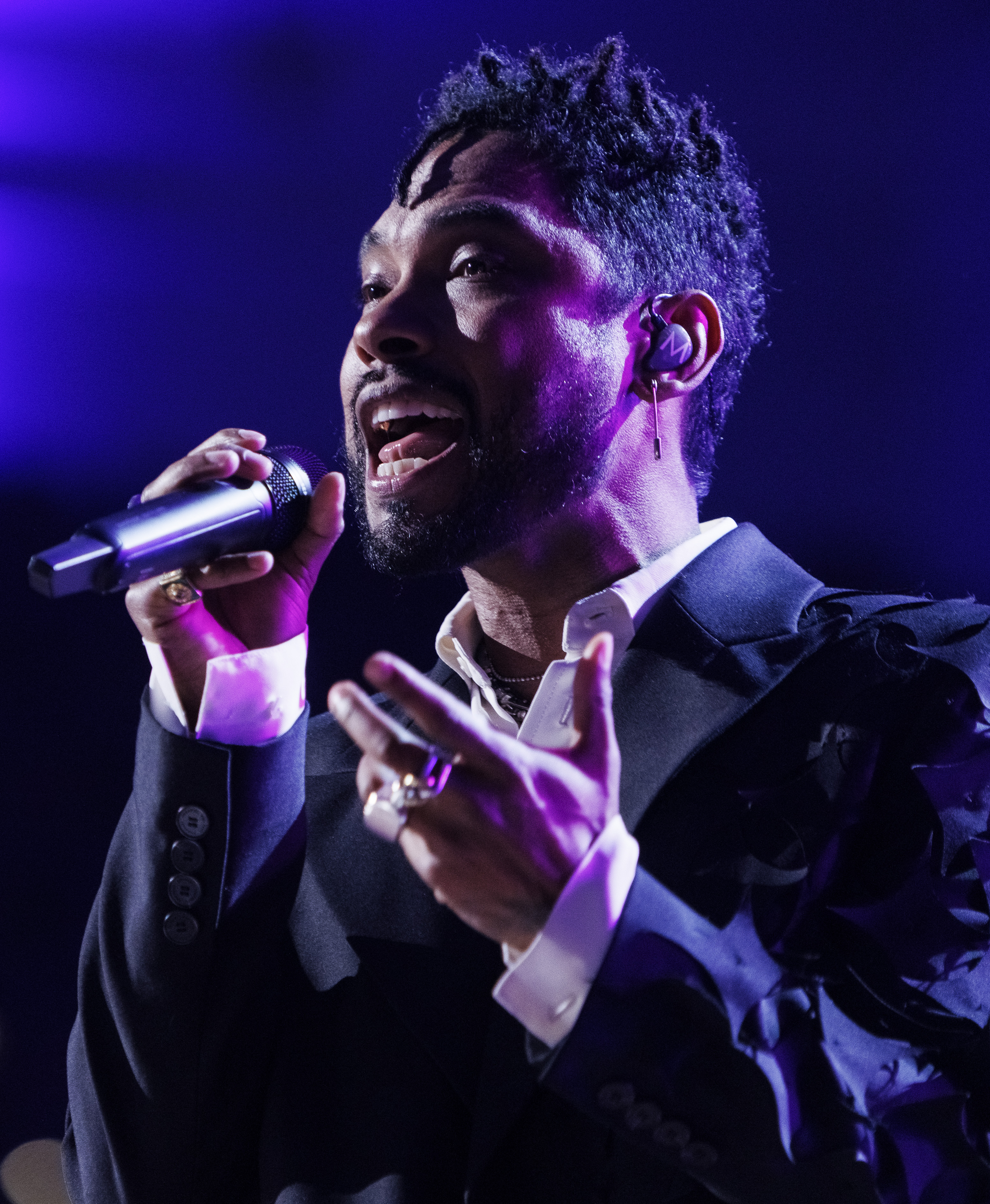
- Miguel performing in 2022
- Born: Miguel Jontel Pimentel; October 23, 1985 (age 40); Lynwood, California, U.S.
- Other names: Miguel Jontel; Jontel Johnson
- Occupations: Singer; songwriter; record producer; actor
- Years active: 2000–present
- Agents: Mark Pitts; Wayne Barrow
- Works: Discography; production
- Spouse: Nazanin Mandi (m. 2018; div. 2022)
- Partners: Margaret Zhang (2024-present)
- Children: 1
- Awards: Full list
- Musical career
- Genres: R&B; alternative R&B
- Instruments: Vocals; guitar
- Labels: RCA; ByStorm; Jive; Black Ice
- Website: officialmiguel.com

Miguel Jontel Pimentel (born October 23, 1985) is an American singer-songwriter and record producer. Raised in San Pedro, California, he began pursuing a music career at age thirteen. He signed with Jive Records to release his debut studio album, All I Want Is You (2010). Though underpromoted upon release, it became a sleeper hit and spawned the hit single "Sure Thing", which went viral on TikTok in 2023; as a result, it reached a second peak of number 11 on the Billboard Hot 100 and remains his most commercially successful release.

After Jive's dissolution in 2011, he was moved to RCA Records and released his second studio album, Kaleidoscope Dream (2012) to continued success, spawning the hit single "Adorn". His third and fourth albums, Wildheart (2015) and War & Leisure (2017) further experimented with psychedelic and alternative influences; the former peaked at number two on the Billboard 200 while the latter contained the single "Sky Walker" (featuring Travis Scott), which received triple platinum certification by the Recording Industry Association of America (RIAA). He later released Caos (2025) to generally positive reviews from critics. Miguel's music includes various genres such as R&B, funk, hip hop, pop, rock and electronic.

== Early life ==
Miguel Jontel Pimentel was born on October 23, 1985, and raised in San Pedro, California. He is one of two sons of an African American mother and a Mexican-American father. Miguel's parents divorced when he was eight years old. At a young age, Miguel was introduced to the older R&B his mother listened to, and his father's musical tastes, including funk, hip hop, jazz and classic rock.

In eleventh grade, Miguel was introduced by a friend to a member of the production company Drop Squad, and he subsequently spent the rest of high school learning his way around a recording studio before seeking a record deal. Miguel is also close high school friends with rapper Blu, who also lived in San Pedro.

== Career ==
=== 2000–2006: Career beginnings ===
Miguel signed a production deal with Drop Squad in 2000. In 2004, he auditioned to be part of the group Fatty Koo, but their label, Columbia Records chose someone else to complete the sextet. Later in 2004, Miguel was signed by independent record label Black Ice and started working on his studio album, Young & Free. It was scheduled to be released on November 30, 2006, but was ultimately shelved. Black Ice released the single "Getcha Hands Up" with a video debut on 106 & Park, but Miguel decided to change his sound and image and walked away from Black Ice Records. He later said in an interview for LA Weekly, "We shot a video, and if you ever see it, you will laugh your ass off. I have a fitted hat on and a white T-shirt and baggy jeans. I was 19 years old and it was the first time anyone had ever given me money."

=== 2007–2011: Signing and belated debut ===
That album was a huge learning experience. I left the marketing of my album and me as an artist up to the discretion of the label. They marketed me like the typical R&B artist, which I can't really blame them for, because that's what they know. But that's not what my lifestyle was.

— Miguel, Billboard

For nearly a year, Miguel's manager at the time submitted several songs to music mogul Mark Pitts; after receiving a song titled "Sure Thing"—which Miguel described as a "highly personal ... record that no one was ever supposed to hear"—Pitts scheduled a meeting with Miguel in October 2007. The following month, Miguel signed a recording contract with Jive Records. Miguel recalled that the signing of his contract took place in a "very small room in a very small office in a small corner of the building at Jive". After being signed, he recorded his debut album All I Want Is You, but was sued by Black Ice for breach of contract. Consequently, his album was not released for two years. In 2007, Miguel also contributed vocals to three tracks on the debut collaborative project of Blu and Exile, Below the Heavens, appearing under the moniker "Miguel Jontel".

For the following three years, he contributed to Usher's Here I Stand and Raymond v. Raymond, as well as Asher Roth's Asleep in the Bread Aisle and Musiq Soulchild's "IfULeave". Miguel also released Mischief: The Mixtape; he explained that the title referred to his attempt to "[tell] people that there is an alternative to getting sort of the same thing".

After his protracted contract dispute with Black Ice was settled, All I Want Is You was released in November 2010. It initially performed poorly, debuting at number 109 on the Billboard 200 on 11,000 copies sold, and was underpromoted by Jive, amid the label's dissolution. The album's title track attained radio airplay, while Miguel toured as a supporting act for Trey Songz and Usher. Its following two singles, "Sure Thing" and "Quickie", performed well on the charts, After falling off the chart for three weeks, All I Want Is You became a sleeper hit, as it re-entered the Billboard 200 and climbed the chart for 22 weeks, before peaking at number 37 on May 14, 2011. It ultimately spent 45 weeks on the chart, and sold 404,000 copies in the US.

=== 2012–2013: Label change and second album ===
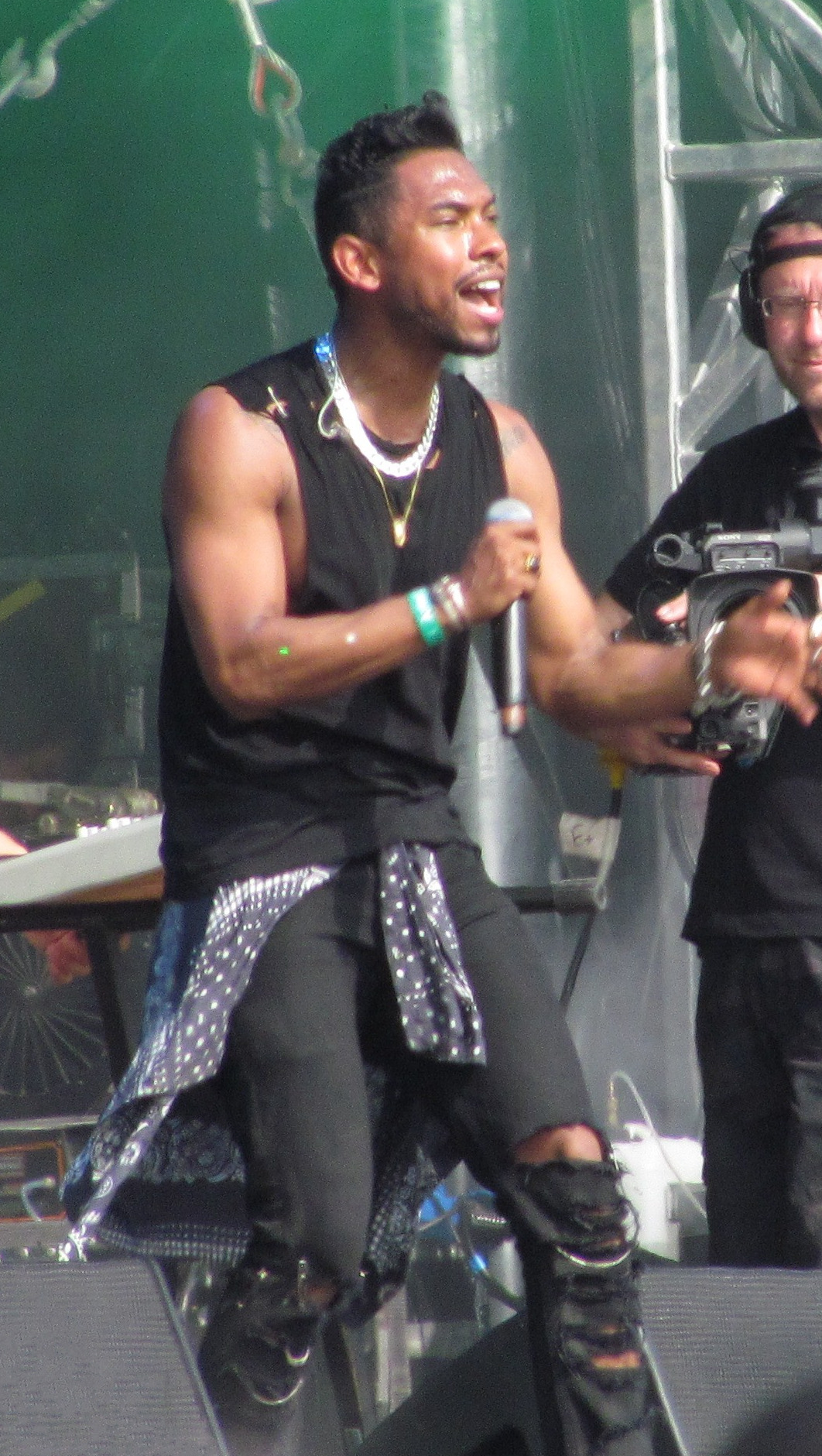
Miguel performing in 2013

After Jive was shut down and absorbed by RCA Records, Miguel was moved to RCA, where Pitts was named president of urban music, and received a new marketing team. His second studio album, Kaleidoscope Dream, was released on October 2, 2012, to critical acclaim. The album debuted at number three on the Billboard 200, selling 71,000 copies in its first week. As of February 2013, Kaleidoscope Dream has sold 322,000 copies, according to Nielsen SoundScan. In February 2013, he released a politically driven video for the song "Candles in the Sun". The album's lead single "Adorn", which had been released on August 7, became a sleeper hit on urban radio. It was Miguel's second number-one single on the Hot R&B/Hip-Hop Songs, and his highest-charting single on the Billboard Hot 100 at number 17. By September, the single had sold 190,000 copies. According to NPR's Audie Cornish, Miguel "broke through to a national audience in 2012" with both "Adorn" and Kaleidoscope Dream. The second single "Do You..." was released on September 18, and reached number 32 on the Hot R&B/Hip-Hop Songs. On March 3, 2013, "How Many Drinks?" was released as its third single. By February 20, Kaleidoscope Dream had charted for 20 weeks on the Billboard 200 and sold 321,400 copies, according to Nielsen SoundScan.

In August 2013, the new single "#Beautiful" with Mariah Carey became Miguel's third million-seller in the US, following "Sure Thing" and "Adorn". During an energetic performance of "Adorn" at the Billboard Music Awards on May 19, Miguel failed in an attempt to leap across the stage, injuring two audience members in the process. Barely missing the stage, Miguel landed on two women, hooking his right leg over one and knocking the other into the stage. The incident, known as the "Miguel Leg Drop", became an immediate internet sensation and has been satirized in numerous internet memes and gifs. It has also been the subject of controversy, with the show's producers claiming that they had denied the singer permission to attempt the leap, while Miguel's representatives have countered that no objections were raised during earlier rehearsals.

=== 2014–2023: Wildheart, War & Leisure and Te Lo Dije ===
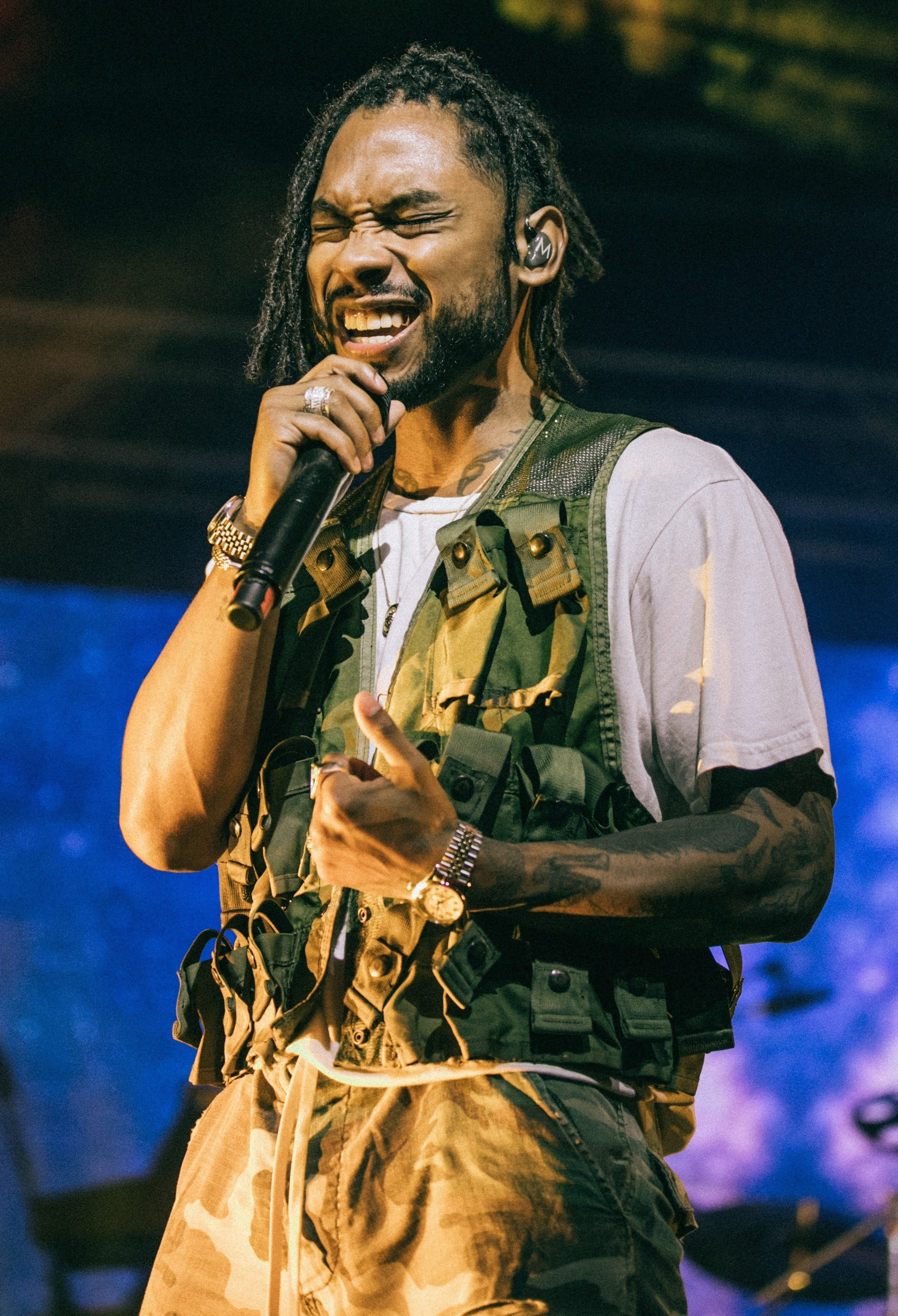
Miguel performing in September 2017

Miguel released his third studio album titled Wildheart on June 30, 2015. In December 2014, Miguel released a 3-track EP entitled NWA.HollywoodDreams.Coffee in promotion for the album. The album was nominated for a Grammy in the category Best Urban Contemporary Album, also "Coffee" was nominated for Best R&B Song. In 2016, Miguel released the single "Waves" that's been remixed by RAC and Tame Impala.

Miguel played a Cuban-American gangster in Ben Affleck's period crime drama Live by Night, which was released on December 25, 2016, He covered Beyoncé's "Crazy in Love" for the theatrical trailers of Fifty Shades Darker (2017).

In September 2016, he was an opening act for Sia's Nostalgic for the Present Tour. The tour ran until November 6 that year.

It's important now, more than ever, for us to recognize humanity in one another. I'm just hoping to help educate myself on the realities of our immigration policy and also shed whatever light I can on the families dealing with cruel and unjust treatment in Adelanto.

— Miguel

Miguel partnered with Revolve Impact and headlined the Schools Not Prisons tour, along with other musicians, to spread awareness of mass incarceration throughout California. His music video for "Now" was filmed in Adelanto, which is the location of California's largest immigration processing center, Adelanto Detention Center. In an interview with Rolling Stone, he expresses his advocacy on the corruption and abuse of the immigration system on detained immigrants, "to see innocent people being ripped from their way of life to essentially be incarcerated and used as cheap labor is really crazy to me."

Miguel's fourth album, War & Leisure, was released on December 1, 2017. He describes the album as having "political undertones, because that's what life feels like right now".

Miguel sang a duet of "Remember Me" with Natalia Lafourcade on the soundtrack of Disney Pixar's movie Coco, which debuted in theaters in the US on November 22, 2017. He also performed the song live at the Oscars in 2018. In January 2019, Benny Blanco, Miguel, and Calvin Harris released a music video for the song "I Found You", in tandem with the While They Wait campaign, an initiative by Brooklyn Defender Services, Refugee and Immigrant Center for Education and Legal Services and American Civil Liberties Union which raises awareness about the challenges immigrants face while waiting for asylum. In an interview with The Breakfast Club Power 105:1 it was revealed Miguel was working on a Latin album. In April 2019, Miguel released the Spanish EP Te Lo Dije. The EP peaked at number 11 on the Top Latin Albums chart, becoming his first chart entry there.

July 13, 2020 – Miguel began conversations with Twitter users on behalf of a GQ interview. He was asked when he would release a new album. Miguel personally replied physically on the social media platform and clarified verbally in the video to expect another, "project", by the end of the year. The term project may not be a sufficient exchange of a full release album. Or it may mean Miguel has begun collaborative performances with other Latin music artists again.

In 2020, he was instrumental in the early stages of Julia Lang setting up the fashion brand VEERT, expressly approving the brand.

In April 2021, Miguel released his new EP Art Dealer Chic 4 via ByStorm and RCA Records.

In early 2023, his R&B hit "Sure Thing" from the album All I Want Is You went viral on TikTok leading to the song to enter several charts around the world, cracking the top 10 for the first time in the UK, and entering the top 20 of the Billboard Hot 100. The song "Girl With The Tattoo Enter" from the same album reached the Top 100 of Spotify US.

=== 2024–present: Caos ===
In November 2024, Miguel released the first single from his album, "Always Time". Later, in March 2025, he featured on the track "Sweet Dreams" by J-Hope of BTS. Throughout September and October of 2025, he released 4 more singles, before releasing the album Caos on October 23.

== Artistry ==
Miguel identifies himself as part of the new wave of R&B artists that include Frank Ocean, the Weeknd and Elle Varner. About.com editor Mark Edward Nero characterizes his music as "eclectic, artsy R&B-pop". Miguel cites musicians Prince, David Bowie, Jimi Hendrix, Freddie Mercury, Phil Collins, Donny Hathaway, the Notorious B.I.G., Kanye West, Saul Williams, Queen, Usher and Pharrell Williams as influences in addition to expressing his admiration for Stevie Wonder, John Lennon and Diane Warren. Miguel revealed his desire to have worked with James Brown, whom he considers the "last innovator for me when it comes to soul". In addition to singing, Miguel also plays the guitar. Miguel has also shown off his dancing ability in multiple music videos and performances like "Told You So".

Miguel incorporates R&B, funk, hip hop, rock and electronic styles into his music. Miguel described his sound as "nostalgic in a sense that it's familiar ... it's shocking, edgy, energizing". In an interview with Paper magazine, he regarded his music as "fly, funkadelic, intergalactic-hip-hop-meets-sexy-orgasmic crazy, dope shit". Miguel is often compared to Babyface and Prince. His vocals are influenced by classic rock bands such as the Beatles, Queen, the Police and Def Leppard. Brian McManus of The Village Voice writes that "Marvin Gaye, Prince, and (his comparison) Van Morrison all linger in his voice." In LA Weekly Salaam Remi states: "Miguel is letting his art rule his whole flow, and that's the best place for an artist to be. To me he kind of feels like Prince, where he's doing this eclectic blend but still coming back to focused songs." Speaking in 2021, media personality and culture critic Charlamagne tha God called Miguel "the greatest R&B singer of the past decade", adding that, "There's a lot of other brothers and sisters doing they thing man, but I'm just talkin' 'bout when it comes to like, that old OG traditional R&B that I love, you know. Jodeci type sh*t and you know, Dru Hill, Guy, 'Piece of My Love.' That soulful mmm! It's always been Miguel for me."

== Personal life ==
Miguel has said that Transcendental Meditation is the key to balancing his lifestyle: "It's good to take a breath from everything and just center yourself. That is the best way of describing it."

Miguel began a relationship with model Nazanin Mandi in 2005. In January 2016, it was announced that they were engaged. The couple married on November 24, 2018, at Hummingbird Nest Ranch in Santa Susana, California. In September 2021, the pair announced their separation, which was called off in early 2022. On October 4, 2022, Mandi filed for divorce citing irreconcilable differences.

In 2017, Miguel was accused of sexual assault by Xian Bass, a fan of his music. Miguel denied the accusation, calling it "bizarre" and "twisted," as well as claiming that Bass' story of what transpired is not accurate.

On September 9, 2025, Miguel revealed on Instagram that he has a child, born in 2024, with former VOGUE China editor-in-chief Margaret Zhang.

Miguel began hosting events exploring creativity, artistic control, and commerce as Steinhardt's Scholar-in-Residence for NYU's 2025-26 academic year on October 14, 2025.

== Discography ==
Studio albums

- All I Want Is You (2010)
- Kaleidoscope Dream (2012)
- Wildheart (2015)
- War & Leisure (2017)
- Caos (2025)

== Tours ==
Headlining

- Kaleidoscope Dream Tour (2012)
- Wildheart Tour (2015)
- The War & Leisure Tour (2018)
- Ascension Tour (2018)
- Caos Tour (2026)

Supporting

- Usher – OMG Tour (2010)
- Trey Songz – Chapter V Tour (2012)
- Alicia Keys – Set the World on Fire Tour (2013)
- Drake – Would You Like a Tour? (2013)
- Bruno Mars – The Moonshine Jungle Tour (2014)
- Sia – Nostalgic for the Present Tour (2016)

== Filmography ==
- BET:blowin up fatty koo (2005)
- Live by Night (2016) as Esteban Suarez
- Detroit (2017) as Malcolm
- The Platinum Life (2017, TV Series) as Himself
- Fearless (2020) as Arcannis (voice)

== See also ==
- List of Afro-Latinos
