= Unplugged (Alicia Keys album) =

Live album by Alicia Keys
- Released: October 7, 2005
- Recorded: July 14, 2005
- Venue: Brooklyn Academy of Music (New York)
- Genres: Soul; R&B
- Length: 72:22
- Label: J
- Producer: Alex Coletti

Alicia Keys chronology
The Diary of Alicia Keys (2003)	Unplugged (2005)	As I Am (2007)

Singles from Unplugged
- 1. "Unbreakable" Released: September 6, 2005

Unplugged is the first live album by American singer-songwriter Alicia Keys. It was released on October 7, 2005, by J Records. The album was recorded at the Brooklyn Academy of Music in New York City on July 14, 2005, as an installment of the television series MTV Unplugged. It comprises rearranged versions of tracks from Keys' first two studio albums, Songs in A Minor (2001) and The Diary of Alicia Keys (2003), alongside several covers and previously unreleased songs, including "Unbreakable".

On release, Unplugged received generally favorable reviews from music critics, with predominant praise directed towards Keys' performance skills, though song rearrangements and covers elicited less laudatory commentaries. A commercial success, it debuted atop the US Billboard 200 with first-week sales of 196,000 copies, becoming the first Unplugged by a female artist to debut at number one. At the 48th Annual Grammy Awards (2006), it was nominated for Best R&B Album. As of 2006, Unplugged has sold over one million copies in the US and over 1.5 million copies worldwide. Its sole single "Unbreakable" peaked at number 34 on the US Billboard Hot 100 and number four on the US Hot R&B/Hip-Hop Songs.

== Background and recording ==
Alicia Keys released her second studio album The Diary of Alicia Keys in December 2003, to widespread critical acclaim. With first-week sales of 618,000 units, it debuted atop the US Billboard 200, becoming her second number-one album after its predecessor Songs in A Minor (2001). The album won Keys her second consecutive Grammy Award for Best R&B Album, and produced US Billboard Hot 100 top-10 singles "You Don't Know My Name", "If I Ain't Got You", and "Diary", as well as the top-20 single "Karma". In September 2004, Keys disclosed her intention to record a live counterpart to The Diary of Alicia Keys, influenced by MTV Unplugged, stating: "For me, performing is the epitome. I love songwriting, I love getting into the studio, but it's when you get on that stage, for me, it really translates to the people just how passionate I am about the words that I write". She subsequently embarked on the Diary Tour (2004–2005).

Following the Diary Tour's completion, Keys announced the taping of her concert for MTV Unplugged in July 2005. Instead of structuring its accompanying album as a live version of The Diary of Alicia Keys, she wrote several new songs, also aiming to perform covers. Keys recorded the concert at the Brooklyn Academy of Music in New York City on July 14, 2005. She aimed for a more intimate setting as opposed to arenas she had previously toured, reflecting on her early concerts at smaller venues. Contrary to original MTV Unplugged installments defined by minimal, acoustic instrumentation, Keys was accompanied by a 16-member band, including a bassist, a keyboardist, and four backing vocalists.

Aside from rearranged versions of tracks from Songs in A Minor and The Diary of Alicia Keys, Keys performed previously unreleased songs "Unbreakable", "Stolen Moments", and "Love It or Leave It Alone". A pop-influenced track, "Unbreakable" lyrically discusses an infrangible romance, while referencing numerous celebrity couples. Co-written by Kanye West, it was originally recorded for The Diary of Alicia Keys, but ultimately left excluded from the album. Keys co-wrote "Stolen Moments" with Al Green, describing its lyricism as focused on a relationship "that shouldn't exist, but it's so perfect in how [its subjects] relate to each other". Keys covered Brenda Holloway's 1964 song "Every Little Bit Hurts" in a simplistic piano-driven form, incorporating "subtle" strings and a gospel choir. Maroon 5's Adam Levine accompanied her to cover The Rolling Stones' 1971 song "Wild Horses"; the R&B-influenced rendition substantially differed from the original's country rock style. Mos Def and Common collaborated with Keys on "Love It or Leave It Alone", while Damian Marley appeared for a performance of his 2005 song "Welcome to Jamrock"; the two performances were fused into the show's closing medley.

== Marketing and sales ==
Keys' installment of MTV Unplugged aired on MTV on September 23, 2005. Prior to the broadcast, J Records issued "Unbreakable" to urban contemporary radio stations in the United States, as the lead single from Unplugged, on September 6. The song peaked at number 34 on the US Billboard Hot 100, becoming Keys first lead single not to reach the chart's top 10, or the summit of Hot R&B/Hip-Hop Songs, on which it peaked at number four. Regardless, Billboard's Chuck Taylor referred to it as a "rare chart and artistic success" for a live recording. "Every Little Bit Hurts" was subsequently released as a promotional single in January 2006.

In the US, Unplugged was released on October 11, 2005, on both CD and DVD, with a double-disc limited edition made available simultaneously. (Note: attributed to multiple sources) The album debuted atop the Billboard 200 and Top R&B/Hip-Hop Albums, with first-week sales of 196,000 units. It registered Keys' third consecutive number-one debut on the former chart, and became the second MTV Unplugged album in history to debut atop the chart, following Nirvana's MTV Unplugged in New York (1994). In its second week, Unplugged registered a 58-percent sales decrease to 83,000 units, descending to number nine on the Billboard 200 and number three on the Top R&B/Hip-Hop Albums. Rolling Stone's Steve Knopper attributed the drastic sales drop to the decline in record sales throughout 2005, citing Unplugged among highly anticipated albums of fall 2005 whose sales had diminished in their second week. The album exited the top 10 of the Billboard 200 in its third week, charting at number 12, and went on to spend a total of 22 weeks on the chart. By February 2006, the album sold over one million units in the US, according to Nielsen SoundScan. Its CD was certified platinum by the Recording Industry Association of America (RIAA) in January 2008, for shipping one million units in the country, while its DVD was certified gold on November 22, 2005, for shipping 50,000 units.

Unplugged debuted and peaked at number eight on the Canadian Albums Chart. By the end of 2005, its CD was certified gold by then-Canadian Recording Industry Association (CRIA) for shipments of 50,000 units in the country, while its DVD was certified platinum for shipments of 10,000 units. Across Europe, the album reached the top 10 in the Netherlands and Switzerland, and number 17 on the European Top 100 Albums. The DVD peaked at number one in Spain, and within the top 10 in Australia, Austria, Belgium, and the Netherlands. By January 2006, Unplugged sold over 1,500,000 copies worldwide.

== Critical reception ==
Professional ratings
Aggregate scores
Source	Rating
Metacritic	65/100
Review scores
Source	Rating
AllMusic	2.5/5 stars
Blender	4/5 stars
E! Online	A−
Entertainment Weekly	B+
Jam!	3.5/5 stars
Los Angeles Times	3/4 stars
Rolling Stone	3/5 stars
Slant Magazine	3/5 stars
Stylus Magazine	B–
USA Today	4/4 stars

Unplugged received generally positive reviews from music critics. At Metacritic, which assigns a normalized rating out of 100 based on reviews from mainstream critics, it holds an average score of 65, based on 14 reviews, indicating "generally favorable reviews". In Blender, Baz Dreisinger declared the album "a stellar set" and a "triumph of vocals", while Gail Mitchell of Billboard wrote that Keys' "self-assured, illuminating" performance emphasized her "boundless passion for her craft". Similarly commending Keys' performance skills, an editor of E! Online concluded: "She might be unplugged—but she's still electrifying." A writer for Q and BBC's Matilda Egere-Cooper both praised the album as a testimony to Keys' talent. In Entertainment Weekly, David Browne positively compared the record's cohesion to Songs in A Minor and The Diary of Alicia Keys, citing renditions of "A Woman's Worth", "If I Ain't Got You", and "Diary" as highlights. Sal Cinquemani of Slant Magazine stated that on Unplugged, Keys brought her "original compositions to soaring new heights". Robert Hilburn of Los Angeles Times wrote that the recording "often mirrors the vitality and discovery of some of the great live R&B and soul collections of the '60s and '70s". Accentuating the renditions of "Fallin'", "You Don't Know My Name", and the covers, USA Today's Steve Jones concluded that the "passion [Keys] pours into Unplugged shows why she should be a lasting star".

Arrangement alterations and previously unreleased material elicited critical polarity. AllMusic's Stephen Thomas Erlewine wrote that "there's no sense of storytelling or momentum" to Keys' performances, adding: "she starts the song in one place and stays there riding in circles until the end". Hilburn criticized tracks absent from Keys' previous albums, while Browne and Stylus Magazine's Thomas Inskeep Thomas Inskeep both commended the cover of "Every Little Bit Hurts", but were dismissive of "Wild Horses". A reviewer for Mojo wrote that the "underpowered" covers confirm "the impression of a high-octane artist tired out and running on empty", while Uncut stated that Keys did not possess "the charisma to indulge in the inter-song banter here, which breaks up any soulful flow that might develop despite her sharp, hectoring vocals". Writing for Rolling Stone, Christian Hoard was ambivalent towards the selection of guest performers on Unplugged, though he hailed "Unbreakable" as the album's standout track. Conversely, Matt Cibula of PopMatters emphasized contributions from Adam Levine on "Wild Horses", and Mos Def, Common, and Damian Marley on "Love It or Leave It Alone"/"Welcome to Jamrock" as some of the album's highlights. Keys' performance was negatively compared to previous MTV Unplugged concerts, due to the perceived lack of intimacy and interactions with the crowd, and overly elaborate instrumentation, by reviewers such as Anthony Carew from Neumu and Andy Gill of The Independent. However, Cinquemani dismissed such criticism, reflecting: "[In] the days since Jon Bon Jovi and Richie Sambora sat on stools and played 'Livin' on a Prayer' on acoustic guitars, 'unplugged' has become more of a metaphorical term than a literal one."

Unplugged and its tracks were nominated for numerous industry awards. At the 48th Annual Grammy Awards (2006), the album was nominated for Best R&B Album, while "Unbreakable" garnered nominations for Best Female R&B Vocal Performance and Best R&B Song, and "If I Was Your Woman" for Best Traditional R&B Vocal Performance. Soon thereafter, the album was nominated for Outstanding Album at the 37th NAACP Image Awards, while "Unbreakable" won the awards for Outstanding Song and Outstanding Music Video; Keys also won the award for Outstanding Female Artist. Internationally, Unplugged was nominated for the Edison Award for International DVD of the Year.

== Track listing ==
Unplugged
No.	Title	Writer(s)	Length
1.	"Intro Alicia's Prayer (Acappella)"	Traditional	1:11
2.	"Karma"	Kerry Brothers Jr.; Alicia Keys; Taneisha Smith	2:10
3.	"Heartburn"	Keys; Tim Mosley; Walter Millsap III; Candice Nelson; Erika Rose	3:03
4.	"A Woman's Worth"	Keys; Rose; Ernie Isley; Christopher Jasper; Ronald Isley; Rudolph Isley; Marvin Isley; O'Kelly Isley Jr.	3:30
5.	"Unbreakable"	Keys; Kanye West; Harold Lilly; Garry Glenn	4:34
6.	"How Come You Don't Call Me"	Prince	5:23
7.	"If I Was Your Woman"	Gloria Jones; Clarence McMurray; Pam Sawyer	4:04
8.	"If I Ain't Got You"	Keys	4:06
9.	"Every Little Bit Hurts"	Ed Cobb	4:01
10.	"Streets of New York (City Life)"	Keys; Smith; Eric Barrier; Nasir Jones; Chris Martin; William Griffin	7:35
11.	"Wild Horses" (featuring Adam Levine)	Mick Jagger; Keith Richards	6:04
12.	"Diary"	Keys; Brothers Jr.	5:53
13.	"You Don't Know My Name"	Keys; West; Lilly; J. R. Bailey; Mel Kent; Ken Williams	3:35
14.	"Stolen Moments"	Keys; Brothers Jr.; Al Green; Wah Wah Watson	5:14
15.	"Fallin'"	Keys	5:10
16.	"Love It or Leave It Alone"/"Welcome to Jamrock" (featuring Mos Def, Common, Damian Marley and friends)	Lorenzo DeChalus; Derek Murphy; Charles Davis; Kirk Khaleel; Joseph Williams; Damian Marley; Stephen Marley; Ini Kamoze	6:42
Total length:			72:22

Limited edition
No.	Title	Writer(s)	Length
8.	"Goodbye"/"Butterflyz"/"If I Ain't Got You"	Keys	8:18

=== Notes ===
- The DVD features the same track order as the CD, on both standard and limited editions, with the music video for "Unbreakable" and behind-the-scenes footage at the end.
- On Unplugged 20, the medley of "Goodbye" and "Butterflyz" is listed separately from "If I Ain't Got You".

Sample credits

- "A Woman's Worth" contains a sample of "Footsteps in the Dark" by The Isley Brothers.
- "Unbreakable" contains a sample of "Intimate Friends" by Eddie Kendricks.
- "Streets of New York (City Life)" contains a sample of "N.Y. State of Mind" by Nas.
- "You Don't Know My Name" contains a sample of "Let Me Prove My Love to You" by The Main Ingredient.
- "Love It or Leave It Alone" contains samples of "Love Me or Leave Me Alone" by Brand Nubian, and "Latoya" by Just-Ice.

== Personnel ==
Credits are adapted from the liner notes of Unplugged.

- Derek Ambrosi – editing
- Eric B. – songwriting (track 10) (Note: songwriter of a sampled recording)
- J. R. Bailey – songwriting (track 13)
- Chris Balogh – production management
- Pablo Batista – percussion
- Anne-Marie Bedney – viola
- Melanie Block – production management
- Allen Branton – lighting direction
- Kerry Brothers Jr. – songwriting (tracks 2, 12, and 14)
- Ray Chew – string arrangement
- Ed Cobb – songwriting (track 9) (Note: songwriter of a covered recording)
- Alex Coletti – direction, 5.1 surround sound mixing, production
- Common – vocals (track 16)
- Nicola Darrach – associate production
- Charles Davis – songwriting (track 16)
- Sara Devine – background vocals
- Jeff Dieterle – trombone
- DJ Premier – songwriting (track 10)
- DJ Walton – tour management
- Peter Edge – executive production
- Anaysha Figueroa – background vocals
- Eileen Folson – cello
- Onree Gill – arrangement (all tracks), keyboards, musical direction
- Garry Glenn – songwriting (track 5)
- Al Green – songwriting (track 14)
- Mariana Green-Hill – violin
- John Harris – engineering
- Ernie Isley – songwriting (track 4)
- Marvin Isley – songwriting (track 4)
- O'Kelly Isley Jr. – songwriting (track 4)
- Ronald Isley – songwriting (track 4)
- Rudolph Isley – songwriting (track 4)
- Mick Jagger – songwriting (track 11)
- Christopher Jasper – songwriting (track 4)
- Paul John – drums
- Gloria Jones – songwriting (track 7)
- Just-Ice – songwriting (track 16)
- Ini Kamoze – songwriting (track 16)
- Ian Kennedy-Kelly – backline chief
- Mel Kent – songwriting (track 13)
- Alicia Keys – arrangement (all tracks), executive production, songwriting (tracks 2–5, 8, 10, and 12–15), vocals (all tracks)
- Kirk Khaleel – songwriting (track 16)
- Eli Koski-Ward – backline guitar tech
- Gwen Laster – violin
- Adam Levine – vocals (track 11)
- Harold Lilly – songwriting (tracks 5 and 13)
- Luke Lowes – stage management
- Lord Jamar – songwriting (track 16)
- Damian Marley – songwriting (track 16), vocals (track 16)
- Stephen Marley – songwriting (track 16)
- Manny Marroquin – mixing
- Clarence McMurray – songwriting (tracks 7)
- Tom McPhillips – set design
- Walter Millsap III – songwriting (track 3)
- Ann Mincieli – engineering assistance
- Mos Def – vocals (track 16)
- Steve Mostyn – bass
- Nas – songwriting (track 10)
- Candice Nelson – songwriting (track 3)
- Jermaine Paul – background vocals
- Sue Pelino – 5.1 surround sound mixing
- Herb Powers, Jr. – mastering
- Prince – songwriting (track 6)
- Darcy Proper – 5.1 surround sound mastering
- Rakim – songwriting (track 10)
- Keith Richards – songwriting (track 11)
- Jared Robbins – engineering assistance
- Jeff Robinson – executive production
- Lou Robinson – J Records production
- Joe Romano – flugelhorn, trumpet
- Erika Rose – songwriting (tracks 3 and 4)
- Sadat X – songwriting (track 16)
- Pam Sawyer – songwriting (tracks 7)
- Taneisha Smith – songwriting (tracks 2 and 10)
- Denise Stoudmire – background vocals
- Timbaland – songwriting (track 3)
- David Watson – flute, saxophone
- Wah Wah Watson – songwriting (track 14)
- Kanye West – songwriting (tracks 5 and 13)
- Ken Williams – songwriting (track 13)
- Arthur White – guitar
- Stewart White – engineering assistance
- Dave Wolf – front-of-house sound

== Charts ==
=== Weekly charts ===
2005 weekly chart performance
Chart	Peak position
Australian Albums (ARIA)	33
Australian Music DVD (ARIA)	9
Australian Urban Albums (ARIA)	5
Austrian Albums (Ö3 Austria)	22
Austrian Music DVD (Ö3 Austria)	4
Belgian Albums (Ultratop Flanders)	14
Belgian Music DVD (Ultratop Flanders)	8
Belgian Albums (Ultratop Wallonia)	12
Belgian Music DVD (Ultratop Wallonia)	6
Canadian Albums (Nielsen SoundScan)	8
Dutch Albums (Album Top 100)	2
Dutch Music DVD (MegaCharts)	4
European Top 100 Albums (Billboard)	17
Finnish Albums (Suomen virallinen lista)	35
French Albums (SNEP)	20
German Albums (Offizielle Top 100)	25
Irish Albums (IRMA)	49
Italian Albums (FIMI)	21
Japanese Albums (Oricon)	20
Japanese Music DVD (Oricon)	86
New Zealand Albums (RMNZ)	28
Polish Albums (ZPAV)	26
Portuguese Albums (AFP)	16
Scottish Albums (Official Charts)	90
Spanish Music DVD (Promusicae)	1
Swiss Albums (Schweizer Hitparade)	7
UK Albums (Official Charts)	52
UK R&B Albums (Official Charts)	5
US Billboard 200	1
US Top R&B/Hip-Hop Albums (Billboard)	1

=== Year-end charts ===
2005 year-end chart performance
Chart	Position
Dutch Albums (Album Top 100)	34
Dutch Music DVD (MegaCharts)	21
US Billboard 200	163
US Top R&B/Hip-Hop Albums (Billboard)	57

2006 year-end chart performance
Chart	Position
US Billboard 200	175
US Top R&B/Hip-Hop Albums (Billboard)	59

== Certifications ==
Certifications and sales
Region	Certification	Certified units/sales
Australia (ARIA) DVD	Gold	7,500^{^}
Canada (Music Canada)	Gold	50,000^{^}
Canada (Music Canada) DVD	Platinum	10,000^{^}
France (SNEP) DVD	Gold	10,000^{*}
Germany (BVMI)	Gold	100,000^{‡}
Japan (RIAJ)	Gold	100,000^{^}
Netherlands (NVPI)	Gold	40,000^{^}
United Kingdom (BPI)	Silver	60,000^{‡}
United States (RIAA)	Platinum	1,000,000^{^}
United States (RIAA) DVD	Gold	50,000^{^}
Summaries
Worldwide	—	1,500,000
^{^} Shipments figures based on certification alone.^{‡} Sales+streaming figures based on certification alone.

== Release history ==
Release dates and formats
Region	Date	Edition(s)	Format(s)	Label(s)	Ref.
Germany	October 7, 2005	Standard; limited	CD; DVD; CD + DVD	Sony BMG	
France	October 9, 2005	Standard	DVD	Jive	
France	October 10, 2005	Standard	CD	Jive	
United Kingdom	October 10, 2005	Standard	CD	J	
Canada	October 11, 2005	Standard; limited	CD; CD + DVD	Sony BMG	
United States	October 11, 2005	Standard; limited	CD; DVD; CD + DVD; digital download	J	
Sweden	October 12, 2005	Standard	CD; DVD	Sony BMG	
Australia	October 16, 2005	Standard	CD	Sony BMG	
Japan	October 26, 2005	Standard	CD	BMG Japan	
Australia	October 30, 2005	Standard	DVD	Sony BMG	
Japan	November 23, 2005	Standard	DVD	BMG Japan	
Various	October 3, 2025	20	Digital download; streaming; vinyl	Legacy; RCA	

== See also ==
- MTV Unplugged
- List of Billboard 200 number-one albums of 2005
- List of Billboard number-one R&B albums of 2005
