= If I Ain't Got You =

2004 single by Alicia Keys

Single by Alicia Keys

from the album The Diary of Alicia Keys
- B-side: "You Don't Know My Name/Will You Ever Know It"
- Written: August 2001
- Released: February 17, 2004
- Recorded: August 2003
- Studio: Kampo (New York)
- Genre: Soul; R&B
- Length: 3:48
- Label: J
- Composer: Alicia Keys
- Lyricist: Alicia Keys
- Producer: Alicia Keys

Alicia Keys singles chronology
"You Don't Know My Name" (2003)	"If I Ain't Got You" (2004)	"Diary" (2004)

Music video
- "If I Ain't Got You" on YouTube

"If I Ain't Got You" is a song recorded by American singer-songwriter Alicia Keys for her second studio album, The Diary of Alicia Keys (2003). It was written and produced by Keys. Lyrically a torch song, the song dismisses materialism as inferior to love. The lyricism was influenced by the death of singer Aaliyah, as Keys acknowledged the ephemerality of life. Musically, the track is a piano-driven soul and R&B ballad drawing on jazz stylings. Regarded as a fan-favorite following the release of The Diary of Alicia Keys, "If I Ain't Got You" was issued as its second single on February 17, 2004, by J Records.

A commercial success, "If I Ain't Got You" peaked at number four on the US Billboard Hot 100 and became Keys' third US Hot R&B/Hip-Hop Songs number-one single. Furthermore, it became the third biggest Billboard Hot 100 hit of 2004. For sales and streaming units exceeding seven million in the United States, the song has been certified septuple platinum by the Recording Industry Association of America (RIAA). Internationally, the song was a sleeper hit, attaining lower chart positions across Europe on release, but eventually earning multi-platinum certifications in Australia, Canada, New Zealand, and the United Kingdom.

"If I Ain't Got You" received unanimous critical acclaim, being declared the highlight of The Diary of Alicia Keys by numerous critics. It won a multitude of industry awards, including Best Female R&B Vocal Performance at the 47th Annual Grammy Awards (2005), where it was also nominated for Song of the Year. The song's accompanying music video, directed by Diane Martel, depicts Keys discontent with her partner, portrayed by Method Man, who is shown pursuing illegal endeavors to acquire material goods. The video won the 2004 MTV Video Music Award for Best R&B Video.

"If I Ain't Got You" is one of Keys' most frequently performed songs, being included on set lists for all her concert tours since its release, and having been performed at various award ceremonies and televised shows. It has also been performed as a collaboration with multiple artists, including Arturo Sandoval, Usher, and Queen Charlotte's Global Orchestra. The song's immediate critical acclaim has been substantiated in retrospective commentaries, with numerous critics hailing it as a classic of contemporary R&B and one of the best love songs of all time. As of 2026, it has accumulated combined sales and streaming units of more than 10 million worldwide.

== Writing and recording ==
Alicia Keys wrote "If I Ain't Got You" in August 2001, briefly after singer Aaliyah's death in the Marsh Harbour Cessna 402 crash. Keys wrote the song during a flight, as flying inside an airplane against the circumstances of Aaliyah's demise presented her with a "sentiment of being present in the moment". Keys aimed to write against materialism, reflecting: "The song idea came together right after Aaliyah passed away. It was such a sad time and no one wanted to believe it. It just made everything crystal clear to me—what matters, and what doesn't." As the songwriting dealt with loss, Keys further stated that the song was given additional meaning following the September 11 attacks. After Christina Aguilera asked Keys to write a song for her fourth studio album, Stripped (2002), Keys considered offering "If I Ain't Got You". However, Peter Edge, J Records' then-executive vice president of artists and repertoire, persuaded Keys otherwise. She consequently kept the song for her second studio album, The Diary of Alicia Keys (2003), and wrote "Impossible" for Aguilera.

Although Keys wrote "If I Ain't Got You" quickly, producing the track proved arduous for her, as she had difficulty choosing an adequate arrangement. She subsequently decided to incorporate drums, as played by Steve Jordan, and guitar, by Hugh McCracken, against her piano. Keys' collaborator and then-partner Kerry Brothers Jr. fused the live drums with his drum programming, in order to preserve a "hip-hop edge". Keys recorded the song at the Kampo Studios in New York City in August 2003. The recording and Tony Black's engineering was interrupted by the August 14–16 Northeast blackout. "If I Ain't Got You" was mixed by Manny Marroquin at Plus XXX in Paris in November 2003, during the initial promotional tour for The Diary of Alicia Keys.

== Music and lyrics ==
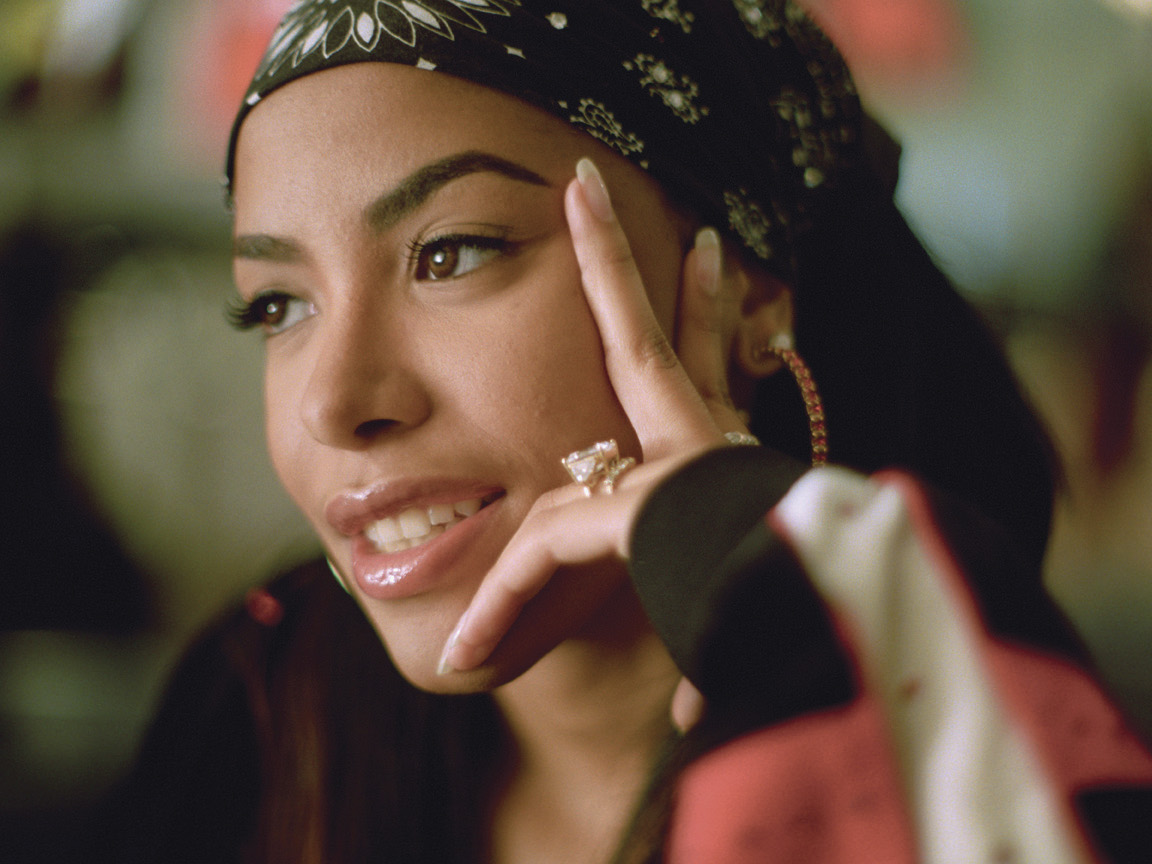
The death of Aaliyah (pictured) influenced the song's lyrical theme.

"If I Ain't Got You" is composed in the key of G major, according to the sheet music published by EMI Music Publishing. Contemporary reviews classified it as a jazz and blues-influenced R&B ballad. Writing for Dotmusic, Christian Ward described the song's musical style as 1980s soul, while Rolling Stone assessed it as a fusion of "organic-feeling lushness" of 1970s R&B balladry and the "digitized 21st century". The song's tempo is a moderately slow 126 beats per minute, in 3/4 time. Keys' vocal range spans two octaves, from the low note of D_{3} to the high note of D_{5}.

Lyrically a torch song, "If I Ain't Got You" condemns materialism and dismisses fame and affluence as inferior to love, as evident in the lines: "Some people live for the fortune / Some people live just for the fame" and "I've been there before / But that life's a bore". Jon Pareles of The New York Times described Keys' vocal performance as starting with "wordless vocal glides" before progressively ascending in pitch, while Rashaun Hall of Billboard wrote: "While within her range, Keys stretches out vocally and with real feeling."

== Critical reception ==
Upon the release of The Diary of Alicia Keys, "If I Ain't Got You" received unanimous critical acclaim, being recognized as the record's standout track by a multitude of publications. (Note: attributed to multiple sources) Writing for PopMatters, Mark Anthony Neal declared it "just short of brilliant", while Christian Ward of Dotmusic hailed its "devastatingly pure" chorus melody. Production and sentimental quality elicited particular praise from Billboard's Rashaun Hall, who called the song a "masterful and haunting ballad that pulls at the heart strings". Shaheem Reid of MTV News emphasized Keys' "jazzy flow" complimenting the fusion of drums, organs and horns. People described the track as a "stunning" ballad evocative of earlier recordings by Aretha Franklin. On The Village Voice's annual critical poll Pazz & Jop, for 2004, "If I Ain't Got You" was listed at number 35. At the 47th Annual Grammy Awards (2005), the song won Best Female R&B Vocal Performance, being further nominated for Song of the Year. Soon thereafter, it won the 2005 Soul Train Music Award for Best R&B/Soul Single – Female, the 2005 NAACP Image Award for Outstanding Song, and the 2005 Soul Train Lady of Soul Award for Best Song of the Year.

The acclaim for "If I Ain't Got You" persevered with retrospective commentaries, predominantly directed towards its timeless quality. In 2005, Stylus Magazine's Thomas Inskeep called it a "brilliant" song "that's now and forever a standard". BBC and Nick Reilly of Rolling Stone UK have regarded the song as a classic of R&B, while Ariana Romero from Netflix and Billboard's Katie Atkinson assessed it as a classic love song. Ranking it as the 16th best single of 2004, Atkinson wrote that the song "feels so timeless and lived-in that was also a perfect hit for modern pop and R&B. Credit is due to her signature piano playing and yearning vocal for selling just how much she can't live without her love." Alongside Billboard, publications such as Forbes and Time Out have listed "If I Ain't Got You" among the best love songs of all time. In the 2024 update of Rolling Stone's 500 Greatest Songs of All Time, the song was placed at number 440. Declaring it Keys' best song, The Guardian's Alexis Petridis wrote: "beautifully played and sung, it is the perfect summation of Keys' ability to come up with a timeless classic soul song that sounds entirely modern, rather than retro". Lauren Nostro and Brian Josephs of Complex ranked "If I Ain't Got You" as Keys' third best song, praising her vocal range and the track's "irresistible" chords.

== Commercial performance ==
Despite considering "If I Ain't Got You" to have stronger crossover appeal, Keys' then-manager Jeff Robinson insisted on releasing "You Don't Know My Name" as the lead single from The Diary of Alicia Keys in order to market the album to Keys' core, urban contemporary-oriented audience first. Initially deciding between "Karma", "Heartburn", and "Diary", Keys and Robinson chose "If I Ain't Got You" as the album's second single due to enthusiastic reactions towards the song from attendees at Keys' concerts. J Records issued it on 7-inch vinyl in the United States on February 17, 2004, subsequently servicing it to urban, rhythmic, and contemporary hit radio.

"If I Ain't Got You" debuted at number 64 on the US Billboard Hot 100 chart dated March 6, 2004. It leaped towards the top 40 in its second week, ascending steadily afterwards. The song entered the top 10 in its eighth week, rising from number 13 towards number eight, on the chart dated April 24. According to Billboard, it was the "fastest breaking single" of April 2004, amassing an airplay audience of 85 million. In its 18th week on the Billboard Hot 100, "If I Ain't Got You" reached its peak of number four, on July 3. On the Hot R&B/Hip-Hop Songs, it debuted at number 63 on January 31, 2004, while "You Don't Know My Name" was at number one. "If I Ain't Got You" reached the summit on the chart dated May 1, becoming Keys' third number-one single. Spending 20 non-consecutive weeks within the top 10 on the Billboard Hot 100, (Note: attributed to May 8, May 22, June 5, June 19, July 17, July 31, August 14, August 28, and September 11, 2004 issues of Billboard Hot 100) and six weeks atop the Hot R&B/Hip-Hop Songs, the song earned third and first places, respectively, on those year-end charts for 2004.

"If I Ain't Got You" was also a top-10 hit on the US Pop and Rhythmic Airplay charts, peaking at numbers nine and five, respectively. Its performance on the Billboard charts earned Keys seven awards at the 2004 Billboard Music Awards, including those for Female Hot 100 Artist of the Year, R&B/Hip-Hop Single of the Year, and R&B/Hip-Hop Airplay Single of the Year, while garnering nominations for Hot 100 Single of the Year and Hot 100 Airplay Single of the Year. For its commercial success, the song also won the American Society of Composers, Authors and Publishers (ASCAP) Rhythm & Soul Award for Top R&B/Hip-Hop Song of the Year, and was among the recipients of the ASCAP Pop Award for Most Performed Songs, both in 2005. By October 2016, "If I Ain't Got You" had sold 1,438,000 units in the US. In 2025, it was certified septuple platinum by the Recording Industry Association of America (RIAA), for combined sales and streaming units of seven million in the country.

"If I Ain't Got You" was issued as a CD single in Europe and Japan in late March 2004. Outside the US, it was a sleeper hit, initially attaining top-20 peak positions in France, the Netherlands, and the United Kingdom. In 2024, 20 years after release, the song was certified double platinum by the British Phonographic Industry (BPI), for combined sales and streaming units of 1,200,000 in the UK. The song was not released as a single in Australia and New Zealand, thus failing to chart, but was eventually certified quadruple platinum by the Australian Recording Industry Association (ARIA) for 280,000 units in Australia, and quintuple platinum by the Recorded Music NZ (RMNZ) for 150,000 units in New Zealand. As of 2026, "If I Ain't Got You" has accumulated sales and streaming units of over 10 million worldwide. (Note: attributed to certified units in Australia, Canada, Germany, Italy, Japan, New Zealand, Portugal, Spain, the UK, and the US, as well as published sales figures in South Korea) It is Keys' most streamed solo track on Spotify, with more than 1.5 billion streams as of June 2026.

== Music video ==
Keys is shown dissatisfied upon being gifted a fur coat by her partner, portrayed by Method Man

Diane Martel directed the accompanying music video for "If I Ain't Got You", which was filmed in Harlem, New York City in January 2004. Thematically, the video serves as a prequel to the music video for "Fallin'", following Keys "before she got on that bus to see her man in prison", according to Martel. The video depicts Keys and her partner, portrayed by rapper and actor Method Man, in a devoted but discordant relationship, as Keys is discontent with her partner's involvement in illegal activities. Reflecting the song's lyrical theme, Keys is rejectful towards his attempts to remedy her frustration with material gifts, as she seeks his presence and affection.

"If I Ain't Got You" premiered on MTV and BET during the week ending March 14, 2004. By May, it had become the most played music video on BET, and was MTV's eighth most rotated music video for the weeks ending April 25 and May 23. At the 2004 MTV Video Music Awards, it won Best R&B Video, also being nominated for Best Female Video. The video further won the NAACP Image Award for Outstanding Music Video in 2005.

== Live performances ==
Keys frequently performed "If I Ain't Got You" live throughout the promotional cycle for The Diary of Alicia Keys. It was first performed during the album's global launch at the Criterion Theatre in London on November 3, 2003. The song was subsequently included on the set list for Keys' co-headlining Verizon Ladies First Tour (2004) with Beyoncé and Missy Elliott. Stephen Kiehl of The Baltimore Sun and SFGate's Neva Chonin both emphasized the song's rendition as the highlight of the tour's shows. Following the tour's conclusion, Keys performed the song on The Tonight Show with Jay Leno on May 3, on Today on May 7, on the episode of Later... with Jools Holland dated May 14, on The Early Show's Summer Concert Series on June 8, and at the BET Awards 2004 on June 29. At the 2004 MTV Video Music Awards on August 29, she performed the song with Stevie Wonder; the performance segued into a rendition of Wonder's 1973 song "Higher Ground", accompanied by Lenny Kravitz. Brian Hiatt of Entertainment Weekly hailed the performance as the ceremony's "sole reminder of the old VMA spirit". "If I Ain't Got You" was included in the set list for Keys' Diary Tour (2004–2005). Reviewing the tour's first of two consecutive shows at the DAR Constitution Hall in Washington, D.C. for The Washington Post, Daly praised Keys' vocal performance, evaluating it as "straight and strong" but not resorting to "histrionic extremes".

Keys performed "If I Ain't Got You", ahead of "Georgia on My Mind" with Jamie Foxx and Quincy Jones, as a tribute to Ray Charles at the 47th Annual Grammy Awards on February 13, 2005. The Washington Post's Sean Daly called the performance one of the ceremony's "most moving". "If I Ain't Got You" was among songs Keys performed during her MTV Unplugged concert at the Brooklyn Academy of Music in New York City on July 14, 2005. Keys performed it as part of a medley with "Goodbye" and "Butterflyz", both from her debut studio album Songs in A Minor (2001). The concert was recorded and released as the live album Unplugged in October 2005. She performed "If I Ain't Got You" alongside "No One" and "Like You'll Never See Me Again", the first two singles from her third studio album As I Am (2007), on Good Morning America on November 13, 2007. At the Super Bowl XLII pre-game show on February 3, 2008, Keys performed "If I Ain't Got You" alongside "Go Ahead", "Teenage Love Affair", "No One", and "Fallin'".

Keys subsequently included "If I Ain't Got You" on set lists for the As I Am Tour (2008), Freedom Tour (2010), Piano & I: A One Night Only Event with Alicia Keys (2011), Set the World on Fire Tour (2013), Here in Times Square (2016), Alicia + Keys World Tour (2022–2023), and Keys to the Summer Tour (2023). "If I Ain't Got You" was performed with Kim Burrell at the BET Awards 2010, on June 27, 2010, as part of a medley with "No One", "Try Sleeping with a Broken Heart", and "Un-Thinkable (I'm Ready)". Keys later performed "If I Ain't Got You" as part of concert sets for episodes of VH1 Storytellers and Live on Letterman, dated November 12 and December 18, 2012, respectively, with the former released on the live album VH1 Storytellers in June 2013. She also performed a rendition of the song with country singer Maren Morris on CMT Crossroads on December 2, 2016.

== Other versions ==
=== Remixes ===
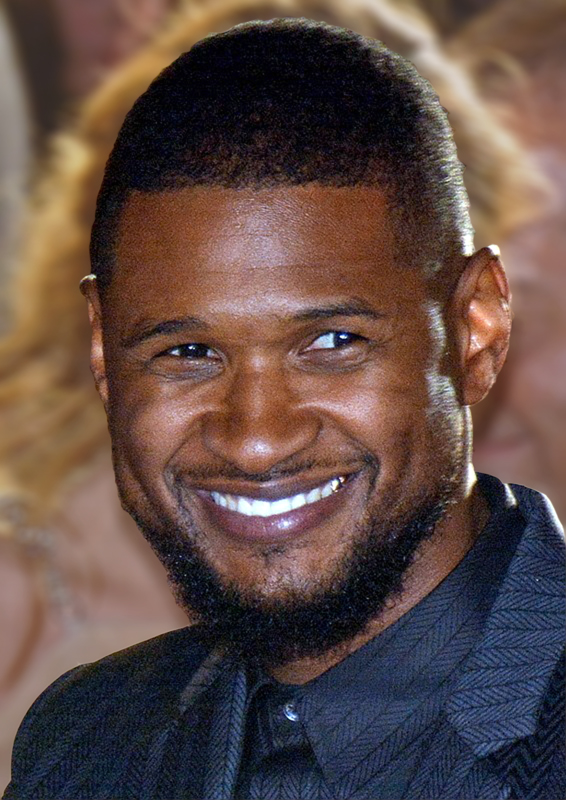
The song was re-recorded as a duet with Usher.

Keys performed "If I Ain't Got You" as a jazz-styled Spanglish collaboration with trumpeter and composer Arturo Sandoval at the 2004 Billboard Latin Music Awards on April 29, 2004; Angie Romero of Billboard retrospectively listed the performance among the award ceremony's all-time highlights. A studio version of the collaboration was recorded and included on the special edition of The Diary of Alicia Keys in September 2004. "If I Ain't Got You" was also re-recorded as a duet with Usher; the pair subsequently recorded their duet "My Boo" in June 2004. While "My Boo" was intended for the special edition of Usher's fourth studio album Confessions, their duet version of "If I Ain't Got You" was included on the special edition of The Diary of Alicia Keys. The version was issued to US radio stations and made available for streaming in August 2004, while being released on a CD single in the UK and France. Keys and Usher performed the song in a medley with "My Boo" during his Super Bowl LVIII halftime show on February 11, 2024. As part of the 20th anniversary campaign for The Diary of Alicia Keys, an extended play (EP) for "If I Ain't Got You" was made available for digital consumption on December 1, 2023. The EP comprised eight versions of the song, including those featuring Sandoval and Usher, as well as remixes produced by Kanye West and the Black Eyed Peas.

On May 3, 2023, Keys released an orchestral version of "If I Ain't Got You", recorded with an orchestra composed of 74 female musicians of color for the soundtrack of the Netflix limited series Queen Charlotte: A Bridgerton Story. Diane Martel returned to direct the version's accompanying music video, which featured the entire orchestra, alongside the South African conductor Ofentse Pitse, French singer Amel Bent, German singer Alicia Awa, Eritrean-Dutch singer Rimon, Swedish-Somali singer Cherrie, and the Norwegian-Iranian singer Delara. The video depicts Keys playing the piano while surrounded by the orchestra, with all performers dressed in 1700s-inspired attire. A Spanish counterpart to the orchestral version was released in June. At the 2023 MTV Video Music Awards, the orchestral version's music video was nominated for Video for Good.

=== Cover versions ===
In 2010, pop rock band Maroon 5 covered "If I Ain't Got You" and included the live rendition on the deluxe edition of their third studio album Hands All Over. English singer-songwriter James Bay recorded an acoustic cover of the song for his EP James Bay Spotify Session 2015. His cover was certified gold by Recorded Music NZ (RMNZ) in 2024, for combined sales and streaming units of 15,000 in New Zealand. YouTubers and singers Samantha Harvey and Davina Michelle recorded covers of "If I Ain't Got You" in 2016 and 2018, respectively. Canadian singer Stacey Ryan also covered the song for her YouTube channel in 2021.

According to Thom Donovan of American Songwriter, "If I Ain't Got You" went on to become "one of the most covered songs on reality TV singing competitions", such as American Idol and The Voice. At the beginning of Keys' tenure as a judge on the latter, season 11 (2016) contestant Lauren Diaz performed "If I Ain't Got You" during the blind audition. Impressed by the performance, Keys selected Diaz for her team. Diaz subsequently released her cover as a single.

"If I Ain't Got You" was featured in Hell's Kitchen (2023), the semi-autobiographical jukebox musical built on Keys' music and lyrics. The song's meaning is reinterpreted in the story, as Davis (portrayed by Brandon Victor Dixon) wrote it for his daughter Ali (portrayed by Maleah Joi Moon). Dixon and Moon's performance was included in Hell's Kitchen (Original Broadway Cast Recording), released in June 2024.

== Track listings and formats ==
US 7-inch single

1. "If I Ain't Got You" (album version) – 3:48
2. "Diary" (featuring Tony! Toni! Toné!) – 3:43

US 12-inch single

1. "If I Ain't Got You" (radio edit) – 3:48
2. "If I Ain't Got You" (instrumental) – 3:48
3. "If I Ain't Got You" (acappella) – 3:36

US promotional CD single

1. "If I Ain't Got You" (radio edit) – 3:48
2. "If I Ain't Got You" (instrumental) – 3:48
3. "If I Ain't Got You" (call out hook) – 0:10

European CD single

1. "If I Ain't Got You" (album version) – 3:54
2. "You Don't Know My Name/Will You Ever Know It" (reggae mix) – 5:06

European maxi CD single

1. "If I Ain't Got You" (album version) – 3:48
2. "If I Ain't Got You" (piano/vocal version) – 3:54
3. "You Don't Know My Name/Will You Ever Know It" (reggae mix) – 5:06
4. "If I Ain't Got You" (music video)

Japanese CD single

1. "If I Ain't Got You" (album version) – 3:49
2. "If I Ain't Got You" (piano/vocal version) – 3:49
3. "If I Ain't Got You" (acappella) – 3:33

French CD single

1. "If I Ain't Got You" (featuring Usher) – 3:52
2. "If I Ain't Got You" (album version) – 3:51
3. "If I Ain't Got You" (piano/vocal version) – 3:51

Digital EP

1. "If I Ain't Got You" (featuring Usher) – 3:51
2. "If I Ain't Got You" (radio edit) – 3:51
3. "If I Ain't Got You" (Spanish version featuring Arturo Sandoval) – 3:51
4. "If I Ain't Got You" (Kanye West Radio Mix #1) – 3:47
5. "If I Ain't Got You" (piano/vocal version) – 3:51
6. "If I Ain't Got You" (Black Eyed Peas Remix) – 3:14
7. "If I Ain't Got You" (instrumental) – 3:52
8. "If I Ain't Got You" (acappella) – 3:35

Digital single (Orchestral version)

1. "If I Ain't Got You" (orchestral version featuring Queen Charlotte Global Orchestra) – 4:53

Digital single (Orchestral Spanish version)

1. "If I Ain't Got You" (orchestral Spanish version featuring Queen Charlotte Global Orchestra) – 4:55

== Credits and personnel ==
Credits are adapted from the liner notes of The Diary of Alicia Keys.

- Katreese Barnes – background vocals
- Tony Black – engineering
- Kerry Brothers Jr. – digital programming
- Fred Cash Jr. – bass
- Darryl Dixon – horns
- L. Green – background vocals
- Steve Jordan – drums
- Alicia Keys – background vocals, lead vocals, piano, production, songwriting
- Manny Marroquin – mixing
- Hugh McCracken – guitar
- Cindy Mizelle – background vocals
- Herb Powers Jr. – mastering
- Joe Romano – horns
- Arcell Vickers – organ
- David Watson – horns

== Charts ==
=== Weekly charts ===
2004–2005 weekly chart performance
Chart	Peak position
Belgium (Ultratip Bubbling Under Flanders)	10
Belgium (Ultratip Bubbling Under Wallonia)	14
Canada CHR/Pop Top 30 (Radio & Records)	22
CIS Airplay (TopHit)	166
France (SNEP)	15
Germany (GfK)	81
Ireland (IRMA)	44
Italy (FIMI)	22
Netherlands (Dutch Top 40)	12
Netherlands (Single Top 100)	11
Poland (Polish Airplay Top 100)	27
Scottish Singles Sales (Official Charts)	27
Switzerland (Schweizer Hitparade)	35
UK Singles (Official Charts)	18
UK Hip Hop/R&B (Official Charts)	6
US Billboard Hot 100	4
US Adult Contemporary (Billboard)	12
US Hot R&B/Hip-Hop Songs (Billboard)	1
US Pop Airplay (Billboard)	9
US Rhythmic Airplay (Billboard)	5

2012–2024 weekly chart performance
Chart	Peak position
Hungary (Single Top 40)	32
Philippines (Philippines Hot 100)	84
South Korea International (Circle)	49

=== Year-end charts ===
2004 year-end chart performance
Chart	Position
Netherlands (Dutch Top 40)	42
Netherlands (Single Top 100)	89
US Billboard Hot 100	3
US Adult Contemporary (Billboard)	37
US Hot R&B/Hip-Hop Songs (Billboard)	1
US Pop Airplay (Billboard)	26
US Rhythmic Airplay (Billboard)	28

2005 year-end chart performance
Chart	Position
US Adult Contemporary (Billboard)	44

2010 year-end chart performance
Chart	Position
South Korea International (Circle)	83

2011 year-end chart performance
Chart	Position
South Korea International (Circle)	105

2012 year-end chart performance
Chart	Position
South Korea International (Circle)	60

2013 year-end chart performance
Chart	Position
South Korea International (Circle)	76

=== Decade-end charts ===
2000s decade-end chart performance
Chart	Position
US Billboard Hot 100	51
US Hot R&B/Hip-Hop Songs (Billboard)	9

== Certifications ==
Certifications and sales
Region	Certification	Certified units/sales
Australia (ARIA)	4× Platinum	280,000^{‡}
Canada (Music Canada)	4× Platinum	320,000^{‡}
Germany (BVMI)	Gold	150,000^{‡}
Italy (FIMI)	Platinum	70,000^{‡}
Japan (RIAJ)	Gold	100,000^{*}
New Zealand (RMNZ)	5× Platinum	150,000^{‡}
Portugal (AFP)	Platinum	40,000^{‡}
South Korea	—	882,728 (Note: In South Korea, "If I Ain't Got You" sold 133,920 digital units in 2010, 248,838 units in 2011, 256,402 units in 2012, 104,483 units in 2013, and 139,085 units in 2015, bringing its sales total to 882,728 units.)
Spain (Promusicae)	Platinum	60,000^{‡}
United Kingdom (BPI)	2× Platinum	1,200,000^{‡}
United States (RIAA)	7× Platinum	7,000,000^{‡}
United States (RIAA) Mastertone	Gold	500,000^{*}
Summaries
Worldwide	—	10,250,000
^{*} Sales figures based on certification alone.^{‡} Sales+streaming figures based on certification alone.

== Release history ==
Release dates and formats
Region	Date	Format(s)	Version(s)	Label(s)	Ref.
United States	February 17, 2004	7-inch vinyl	Original	J	
United States	February 23, 2004	Urban adult contemporary radio; urban contemporary radio	Original	J	
United States	February 24, 2004	12-inch vinyl	Original	J	
United States	March 9, 2004	Rhythmic contemporary radio	Original	J	
Japan	March 24, 2004	CD	Original	BMG	
United Kingdom	March 29, 2004	CD; maxi CD	Original	J	
Germany	April 5, 2004	Maxi CD	Original	BMG	
United States	April 27, 2004	Contemporary hit radio	Original	J	
United States	August 9, 2004	Adult contemporary radio	Original	J	
France	September 28, 2004	CD	Original; remix featuring Usher	Jive	
Various	May 3, 2023	Digital download; streaming	Orchestral	Sony	
Various	June 15, 2023	Digital download; streaming	Orchestral Spanish	Sony	
Various	December 1, 2023	Digital download; streaming (EP)	Original; Spanish; remixes	Sony	

== See also ==
- List of Billboard Hot 100 top-ten singles in 2004
- List of Hot R&B/Hip-Hop Singles & Tracks number ones of 2004
- Billboard Year-End Hot 100 singles of 2004
- Grammy Award for Best Female R&B Vocal Performance
- Le Violon d'Ingres, the 1924 photograph by Man Ray, which influenced the single cover for "If I Ain't Got You"
