= As I Am Tour =

2008 concert tour by Alicia Keys

- Tour by Alicia Keys
- Promotional poster for the tour
- Associated album: As I Am
- Start date: February 28, 2008
- End date: December 20, 2008
- Legs: 4
- No. of shows: 41 in Europe; 39 in North America; 9 in Oceania; 5 in Asia; 94 total
- Box office: US $32 million ($47.85 in 2025 dollars)

Alicia Keys concert chronology
- Diary Tour (2005); As I Am Tour (2008); Freedom Tour (2010)

The As I Am Tour was the third worldwide concert tour by American singer-songwriter Alicia Keys, in support of her third studio album, As I Am (2007). According to Pollstar, Alicia Keys' As i Am Tour grossed $32 million worldwide in 2008/2009, with 55 shows.

== Opening acts ==
- Jordin Sparks (North America) (Oceania) (select venues)
- Ne-Yo (North America) (select venues)
- Solange Knowles (Europe) (select venues)
- Stephen Marley (Europe) (select venues)
- Jermaine Paul (Europe) (select venues)
- The Ruling Party (Europe) (select venues)
- Soul II Soul (Europe) select venues

== Set list ==
1. "Ghetto Story"
2. "Waiting for Your Love"
3. "Where Do We Go From Here"
4. "You Don't Know My Name"
5. "Teenage Love Affair"
6. "Heartburn"
7. "Sure Looks Good to Me"
8. "How Come You Don't Call Me"
9. "Butterflyz"
10. "Goodbye"
11. "Prelude to a Kiss"
12. "Superwoman"
13. "I Need You"
14. "Wreckless Love"
15. "Diary" (contains excerpts from "Tender Love")
16. "My Boo"
17. "Unbreakable" (contains excerpts from "Step in the Name of Love")
18. "Like You'll Never See Me Again"
19. "Feeling U, Feeling Me"
20. "Go Ahead"
21. "A Woman's Worth"
22. "Lesson Learned"
23. "So Simple"
24. "Karma"
25. "Thing About Love"
26. "Fallin'" (contains excerpts from "It's a Man's Man's Man's World")
  Encore
27. "No One"
28. "If I Ain't Got You"

== Tour dates ==
Date	City	Country	Venue	Opening Act
Europe
February 28, 2008	Birmingham	England	National Indoor Arena	Soul II Soul; Jermaine Paul
February 29, 2008	London	England	The O2 Arena	Soul II Soul; Jermaine Paul
March 3, 2008	Lyon	France	Halle Tony Garnier	The Ruling Party; Jermaine Paul
March 4, 2008	Frankfurt	Germany	Festhalle Frankfurt	The Ruling Party; Jermaine Paul
March 7, 2008	Frederiksberg	Denmark	SAS Falkoner Center	The Ruling Party; Jermaine Paul
March 8, 2008	Stockholm	Sweden	Hovet	The Ruling Party; Jermaine Paul
March 11, 2008	Oslo	Norway	Oslo Spektrum	The Ruling Party; Jermaine Paul
March 13, 2008	Hamburg	Germany	Color Line Arena	The Ruling Party; Jermaine Paul
March 14, 2008	Zürich	Switzerland	Hallenstadion	The Ruling Party; Jermaine Paul
March 16, 2008	Badalona	Spain	Palau Municipal d'Esports de Badalona	The Ruling Party; Jermaine Paul
March 17, 2008	Madrid	Spain	Palacio de Deportes de la Comunidad de Madrid	The Ruling Party; Jermaine Paul
March 19, 2008	Lisbon	Portugal	Pavilhão Atlântico	The Ruling Party; Jermaine Paul
March 22, 2008	Marseille	France	Le Dôme de Marseille	The Ruling Party; Jermaine Paul
March 24, 2008	Rotterdam	Netherlands	Rotterdam Ahoy	The Ruling Party; Jermaine Paul
March 25, 2008	Antwerp	Belgium	Sportpaleis	The Ruling Party; Jermaine Paul
March 27, 2008	Paris	France	Palais omnisports de Paris-Bercy	The Ruling Party; Jermaine Paul
March 29, 2008	Milan	Italy	Datch Forum di Assago	The Ruling Party; Jermaine Paul
North America
April 19, 2008	Hampton	United States	Hampton Coliseum	Ne-Yo
April 21, 2008	Philadelphia	United States	Liacouras Center	Ne-Yo
April 26, 2008	Columbus	United States	Schottenstein Center	Ne-Yo
April 27, 2008	St. Louis	United States	Scottrade Center	Ne-Yo
April 30, 2008	Minneapolis	United States	Target Center	Ne-Yo
May 1, 2008	Kansas City	United States	Sprint Center	Ne-Yo; Jordin Sparks
May 4, 2008	Anaheim	United States	Honda Center	Ne-Yo; Jordin Sparks
May 5, 2008	Los Angeles	United States	Staples Center	Ne-Yo; Jordin Sparks
May 7, 2008	San Diego	United States	San Diego Sports Arena	Ne-Yo; Jordin Sparks
May 9, 2008	Las Vegas	United States	MGM Grand Garden Arena	Ne-Yo; Jordin Sparks
May 10, 2008	San Jose	United States	HP Pavilion at San Jose	Ne-Yo; Jordin Sparks
May 11, 2008	Sacramento	United States	ARCO Arena	Ne-Yo; Jordin Sparks
May 14, 2008	Grand Prairie	United States	Nokia Theatre at Grand Prairie	Ne-Yo; Jordin Sparks
May 15, 2008	Memphis	United States	FedExForum	Ne-Yo; Jordin Sparks
May 18, 2008	Houston	United States	Toyota Center	Ne-Yo; Jordin Sparks
May 22, 2008	New Orleans	United States	New Orleans Arena	Ne-Yo; Jordin Sparks
May 24, 2008	Tampa	United States	St. Pete Times Forum	Ne-Yo; Jordin Sparks
May 25, 2008	Miami	United States	American Airlines Arena	Ne-Yo; Jordin Sparks
May 28, 2008	Atlanta	United States	Philips Arena	Ne-Yo; Jordin Sparks
May 30, 2008	Greensboro	United States	Greensboro Coliseum	Ne-Yo; Jordin Sparks
May 31, 2008	Atlantic City	United States	Mark G. Etess Arena	Ne-Yo; Jordin Sparks
June 3, 2008	Montreal	Canada	Bell Centre	Ne-Yo; Jordin Sparks
June 5, 2008	Toronto	Canada	Air Canada Centre	Ne-Yo; Jordin Sparks
June 6, 2008	Auburn Hills	United States	The Palace of Auburn Hills	Ne-Yo; Jordin Sparks
June 7, 2008	Rosemont	United States	Allstate Arena	Ne-Yo; Jordin Sparks
June 11, 2008	Boston	United States	TD Banknorth Garden	Ne-Yo; Jordin Sparks
June 13, 2008	Washington, D.C.	United States	Verizon Center	Ne-Yo; Jordin Sparks
June 15, 2008	Baltimore	United States	1st Mariner Arena	Ne-Yo; Jordin Sparks
June 17, 2008	Newark	United States	Prudential Center	Ne-Yo; Jordin Sparks
June 18, 2008	New York City	United States	Madison Square Garden	Ne-Yo; Jordin Sparks
Europe
July 8, 2008	London	England	O_{2} Arena	Stephen Marley
July 9, 2008	Manchester	England	Manchester Evening News Arena	Stephen Marley
July 11, 2008	Rotterdam	Netherlands	North Sea Jazz Festival (Nile stage) ^{[a]}	Chaka Khan; The Roots
July 12, 2008	Paris	France	Palais omnisports de Paris-Bercy	Stephen Marley
July 16, 2008	Locarno	Switzerland	Piazza Grande ^{[b]}	Amy Macdonald
July 17, 2008	Montreux	Switzerland	Stravinsky Auditorium ^{[c]}	Craig David
July 19, 2008	Perugia	Italy	Piazza Danti ^{[d]}	Festival curated lineup.
July 20, 2008	Lucca	Italy	Piazza Napoleone ^{[e]}	DeVotchKa
July 26, 2008	Nîmes	France	Arena of Nîmes	Ben l'Oncle Soul
Asia
July 29, 2008	Hong Kong	Hong Kong	AsiaWorld-Arena	
July 31, 2008	Jakarta	Indonesia	Jakarta Convention Center	
August 3, 2008	Singapore	Singapore	Fort Canning ^{[f]}	
August 5, 2008	Pasay	Philippines	SMX Convention Center	
August 7, 2008	Seoul	South Korea	Jamsil Gymnasium	
North America
September 12, 2008	Mashantucket	United States	MGM Grand at Foxwoods	
September 13, 2008	Hammond	United States	The Venue at Horseshoe Casino	
September 14, 2008	Cincinnati	United States	Procter & Gamble Hall	
September 17, 2008	Denver	United States	Wells Fargo Theatre	
September 18, 2008	Salt Lake City	United States	Abravanel Hall	
September 20, 2008	Seattle	United States	Qwest Field Events Center	
September 21, 2008	Vancouver	Canada	Orpheum	
September 26, 2008	Santa Barbara	United States	Santa Barbara Bowl	
September 27, 2008	Phoenix	United States	Dodge Theater	
September 28, 2008	Tucson	United States	Anselmo Valencia Tori Amphitheater	
Europe
October 10, 2008	Zagreb	Croatia	Dom Sportova	
October 11, 2008	Belgrade	Serbia	Belgrade Arena	
October 13, 2008	Bratislava	Slovakia	Incheba Expo Arena	
October 14, 2008	Prague	Czech Republic	Tesla Arena	
October 15, 2008	Warsaw	Poland	Torwar Hall	
October 18, 2008	Berlin	Germany	O_{2} World	
October 19, 2008	Munich	Germany	Olympiahalle	
October 21, 2008	Stuttgart	Germany	Hanns-Martin-Schleyer-Halle	
October 22, 2008	Oberhausen	Germany	König Pilsener Arena	
October 23, 2008	Mannheim	Germany	SAP Arena	
October 25, 2008	Metz	France	Le Galaxie	
October 27, 2008	Rotterdam	Netherlands	The Ahoy	
October 28, 2008	Antwerp	Belgium	Sportpaleis	
October 30, 2008	Toulouse	France	Le Zénith	
October 31, 2008	Nantes	France	Le Zénith	
Oceania
December 6, 2008	Auckland	New Zealand	Vector Arena	
December 7, 2008	Wellington	New Zealand	TSB Bank Arena	
December 10, 2008	Brisbane	Australia	Brisbane Entertainment Centre	
December 12, 2008	Sydney	Australia	Sydney SuperDome	
December 13, 2008	Hunter Valley	Australia	Bimbadgen Estate	
December 14, 2008	Bowral	Australia	Centennial Vineyards ^{[g]}	
December 17, 2008	Melbourne	Australia	Rod Laver Arena	
December 18, 2008	Adelaide	Australia	Adelaide Entertainment Centre	
December 20, 2008	Swan Valley	Australia	Sandalford Wines ^{[g]}	

Notes

a This concert was a part of the North Sea Jazz Festival.
b This concert was a part of the Moon & Stars Festival .
c This concert was a part of the Montreux Jazz Festival.

d This concert was a part of the Umbria Jazz Festival.
e This concert was a part of the Lucca Summer Festival.
f This concert was a part of the Singfest.
g These concerts were a part of A Day on the Green.

Cancellations

- February 25, 2008 Glasgow, Scotland Scottish Exhibition and Conference Centre
- February 26, 2008 Manchester, England Manchester Evening News Arena (later postponed to July 9, 2008)
- April 22, 2008 Pittsburgh, Pennsylvania Peterson Events Center
- April 24, 2008 Cleveland, Ohio Wolstein Center

== Critical reception ==
Cathy Rose A. Garcia from The Korea Times found Keys’ concert at the Jamsil Gymnasium in Soul “fierce” and stated that “Keys had the audience in the palm of her hand” while “show[ing] off her strong vocals to full effect”. Ben Werner from The Orange County Register felt that “Keys hasn’t quite blossomed into a master of the form, her balance of choreographed routines and moments alone tickling the ivories never flowing as seamlessly as it should” but, however, found the concert “mostly satisfying”.

== Personnel ==
- Tour director: Steve Dixon
- Production designers: Nick Whitehouse, Steve Dixon, Bryan Leitch, VYV
- Lighting designer: Nick Whitehouse
- Lighting directors: Steven Douglas, Dom Smith, Chris Steel
