= Golden Child (Alicia Keys song) =

2023 single by Alicia Keys

Single by Alicia Keys

from the album The Diary of Alicia Keys 20
- Written: 2003
- Released: November 2, 2023
- Length: 4:03
- Label: RCA
- Songwriter: Alicia Keys
- Producer: Alicia Keys

Alicia Keys singles chronology
"If I Ain't Got You" (orchestral version) (2023)	"Golden Child" (2023)	"Lifeline" (2023)

Lyric video
- "Golden Child" on YouTube

"Golden Child" is a song by American singer-songwriter Alicia Keys. It was released on November 2, 2023, as the lead single of 20th anniversary edition of her second studio album, The Diary of Alicia Keys (2003). Keys wrote the song, produced by her, in 2003.

== Background and release ==
"Golden Child" was first published as a poem in Keys's 2004 book Tears for Water: Songbook of Poems and Lyrics. Nearly a decade later, Keys shared the track in December 2013 through her website AKVault, a platform that hosted unreleased live performances, studio recordings, blog posts, and behind-the-scenes content before its closure. About the track, Keys wrote on the site, "I wrote this song to pull myself up out of a slump I was in. Feelings of not going anywhere, fears of not being able to make it". Originally shared in that medium, the song continued to circulate through unofficial YouTube uploads after the site was deactivated. The song was later included on a 24-track release issued in December to commemorate the twentieth anniversary of The Diary of Alicia Keys.

== Composition ==
"Golden Child" was written and produced by Keys; it features positive lyrics like: "You don't have to be afraid / 'Cause time is on your side / And they don't know the power you possess or the beauty that's inside".
