= Diary Tour =

2004–2005 concert tour by Alicia Keys

- Tour by Alicia Keys
- Location: Asia; Oceania; North America
- Associated album: The Diary of Alicia Keys
- Start date: October 11, 2004
- End date: April 24, 2005
- Legs: 3
- No. of shows: 46

Alicia Keys concert chronology
- Verizon Ladies First Tour (2004); Diary Tour (2004–2005); As I Am Tour (2008)

The Diary Tour is the second concert tour by American singer-songwriter, Alicia Keys. The tour supports her second studio album The Diary of Alicia Keys (2003).

== Opening act ==
- John Legend (North America)

== Setlist ==
1. "Instrumental Sequence" (contains elements of "Sing, Sing, Sing (With a Swing)")
2. "Karma"
3. "Jane Doe"
4. "Rock wit U"
5. "Heartburn"
6. "If I Was Your Woman" / "Walk on By"
7. "A Woman's Worth"
8. "Black Ivory Soul" (performed by backing vocalist)
9. "God Bless the Child"
10. "How Come You Don't Call Me"
11. "Wake Up"
12. "Diary"
13. "Instrumental Sequence" (contains elements of "Minnie The Moocher")
14. "Girlfriend"
15. "My Boo"
16. "So Simple"
17. "Why Do I Feel So Sad"
18. "Instrumental Sequence"
19. "Good Morning Heartache"
20. "I Put a Spell on You"
21. "Fallin'"
22. "You Don't Know My Name"
23. "If I Ain't Got You"

== Tour dates ==
List of 2004 concerts
Date	City	Country	Venue	Ref.
October 11	Bangkok	Thailand	Impact, Muang Thong Thani	
October 15	Osaka	Japan	Festival Hall	
October 17	Tokyo	Japan	Tokyo Bay NK Hall	
October 18	Tokyo	Japan	Tokyo International Forum Hall A	
October 19	Fukuoka	Japan	Zepp Fukuoka	
October 22	Melbourne	Australia	Palais Theatre	
October 25	Sydney	Australia	Enmore Theatre	
October 26	Sydney	Australia	Enmore Theatre	
October 29	Brisbane	Australia	Lyric Theatre	
October 31	Auckland	New Zealand	Aotea Centre	

List of 2005 concerts
Date	City	Country	Venue
North America
February 23	Columbia	United States	Township Auditorium
February 25	Miami	United States	James L. Knight Center
February 26	Tampa	United States	Morsani Hall
February 27	Augusta	United States	Bell Auditorium
March 2	Birmingham	United States	BJCC Concert Hall
March 4^{[A]}	Houston	United States	Reliant Stadium
March 5	Grand Prairie	United States	Nokia Live at Grand Prairie
March 6	Austin	United States	Bass Concert Hall
March 9	Denver	United States	The Lecture Hall
March 11	Phoenix	United States	Dodge Theatre
March 12	Las Vegas	United States	The Joint
March 13	Reno	United States	Reno Events Center
March 16	Los Angeles	United States	Kodak Theatre
March 17	Los Angeles	United States	Kodak Theatre
March 19	Oakland	United States	Paramount Theatre
March 20	Oakland	United States	Paramount Theatre
March 23	St. Louis	United States	Fox Theatre
March 25	Detroit	United States	Fox Theatre
March 26	Detroit	United States	Fox Theatre
March 27	Mount Pleasant	United States	Soaring Eagle Entertainment Hall
March 30	Rama	Canada	Casino Rama Entertainment Centre
April 1	Chicago	United States	Chicago Theatre
April 2	Chicago	United States	Chicago Theatre
April 3	Cincinnati	United States	Springer Auditorium
April 6	Atlanta	United States	Fox Theatre
April 7	Atlanta	United States	Fox Theatre
April 9	Hampton	United States	Hampton Coliseum
April 12	Philadelphia	United States	Academy of Music
April 13	Ledyard	United States	Fox Theatre
April 14	Boston	United States	Wang Theatre
April 16	Washington, D.C.	United States	DAR Constitution Hall
April 17	Washington, D.C.	United States	DAR Constitution Hall
April 20	Richmond	United States	Landmark Theater
April 22	New York City	United States	Radio City Music Hall
April 23	New York City	United States	Radio City Music Hall
April 24	Newark	United States	Prudential Hall

Festivals and other miscellaneous performances
^{A} Houston Livestock Show and Rodeo

Cancellations and rescheduled shows

March 2, 2005	Birmingham, Alabama	Jemison Concert Hall	Moved to the BJCC Concert Hall

=== Box office score data ===
Venue	City	Tickets sold / available	Gross revenue
Nokia Live at Grand Prairie	Grand Prairie	6,102 / 6,102 (100%)	$369,948
Kodak Theatre	Los Angeles	6,702 / 6,884 (97%)	$481,899
Fox Theatre	Atlanta	8,899 / 9,356 (95%)	$589,773
