= The Diary of Alicia Keys =

2003 studio album by Alicia Keys

Studio album by Alicia Keys
- Released: November 28, 2003
- Recorded: December 2002 – November 2003
- Studios: The Crib (Philadelphia); The Hit Factory (New York); Hit Factory Criteria (Miami); Kampo (New York); KrucialKeys (New York); Plus XXX (Paris); Quad (New York); Sarm West (London); Soundwise (Amsterdam)
- Genres: Soul; R&B; contemporary classical; hip-hop
- Length: 57:45
- Label: J
- Producers: Alicia Keys; Kerry Brothers Jr.; Timbaland; Easy Mo Bee; D'wayne Wiggins; Kanye West; Dre & Vidal; Kumasi

Alicia Keys chronology
Songs in A Minor (2001)	The Diary of Alicia Keys (2003)	Unplugged (2005)

Singles from The Diary of Alicia Keys
- 1. "You Don't Know My Name" Released: November 10, 2003; 2. "If I Ain't Got You" Released: February 23, 2004; 3. "Diary" Released: May 24, 2004; 4. "Karma" Released: October 26, 2004

Singles from The Diary of Alicia Keys 20
- 1. "Golden Child" Released: November 2, 2023

The Diary of Alicia Keys is the second studio album by American singer-songwriter Alicia Keys. It was released on November 28, 2003, by J Records. Almost entirely written and produced by Keys, the album is a concept album functioning as her auditory diary, primarily dealing with relationship complexities. Musically, it is predominantly a soul, R&B, contemporary classical, and hip-hop record.

While touring in support of her debut studio album Songs in A Minor (2001), Keys began writing songs for The Diary of Alicia Keys, conceiving it as an intimate record devoid of featured artists. Recording sessions commenced following the Songs in A Minor Tour's culmination in December 2002 and continued even into the international promotional tour ahead of the album's release in November 2003. Keys' then-partner and frequent collaborator Kerry Brothers Jr. largely contributed to the album, while other contributors included Timbaland, Easy Mo Bee, Kanye West, and Dre & Vidal, with whom Keys collaborated for the first time. Furthermore, Keys eschewed the neo soul style of Songs in A Minor in favor of 1960s–1970s-influenced traditional soul for The Diary of Alicia Keys.

The Diary of Alicia Keys received widespread acclaim from music critics, who generally agreed that it refuted expectations of a sophomore slump, while praising Keys' artistic maturity and vocal performance. A substantial commercial success, it debuted atop the US Billboard 200, with first-week sales of 618,000 units, and became one of the best-selling albums of 2003 and 2004, both in the United States and worldwide. The album yielded four singles, three of which—"You Don't Know My Name", "If I Ain't Got You", and "Diary"—reached the top 10 on the US Billboard Hot 100 and were among biggest hits of 2004 in the US. To further promote The Diary of Alicia Keys, Keys embarked on the Verizon Ladies First Tour (2004), co-headlined with Beyoncé and Missy Elliott, and the Diary Tour (2004–2005).

The Diary of Alicia Keys earned Keys nominations for numerous industry awards and won her a second Grammy Award for Best R&B Album, among other awards. In retrospective commentaries, many critics stated that the album solidified Keys' status in the music industry and extended her critical and commercial success past her debut. The album has been certified quintuple platinum by the Recording Industry Association of America (RIAA), for combined sales and album-equivalent units of five million in the US. It has sold over eight million copies worldwide. In commemoration of its 20th anniversary, the album was reissued as The Diary of Alicia Keys 20 in December 2023, and subsequently won a Grammy Award for Best Immersive Audio Album.

== Background and development ==
Alicia Keys' debut studio album Songs in A Minor was released on June 26, 2001, by J Records. A fusion of classical music, traditional and modern styles of soul, and contemporary R&B, it received widespread critical acclaim, being hailed as an auspicious and accomplished debut. (Note: attributed to multiple sources) Preceded by the US Billboard Hot 100 number-one single "Fallin'", the album debuted atop the US Billboard 200 with first-week sales of 236,000 units. It earned Keys five Grammy Awards at the 44th Annual Grammy Awards (2002), which tied Keys with Lauryn Hill as the female artist with most Grammy Awards won in a single ceremony. (Note: Beyoncé broke the record at the 52nd Annual Grammy Awards (2010), when she won six awards.) The album is widely regarded as an immensely influential record of its era, (Note: attributed to multiple sources) and is credited with propelling Keys to global prominence, placing her at the forefront of neo soul. One of the best-selling albums of 2001 and 2002, Songs in A Minor had sold over 10 million copies worldwide by November 2003. Consequently, substantial pressure was placed on Keys' second studio album to match or exceed that success, as to avoid the sophomore slump. Keys, however, felt confident due to her experience from the creation of Songs in A Minor. Keys' then-partner and collaborator Kerry Brothers Jr. would retrospectively state that Keys having creative control over her artistry since her debut helped them overcome the concerns, as they strived to replicate, but enhance, the formula of Songs in A Minor. While on the Songs in A Minor Tour (2002), Keys began developing ideas for what would become The Diary of Alicia Keys. Conceiving it as an intimate record, Keys refrained from seeking collaborators out to contribute to the album, despite distinguished collaborations with Eve and Christina Aguilera in 2002.

== Writing and recording ==
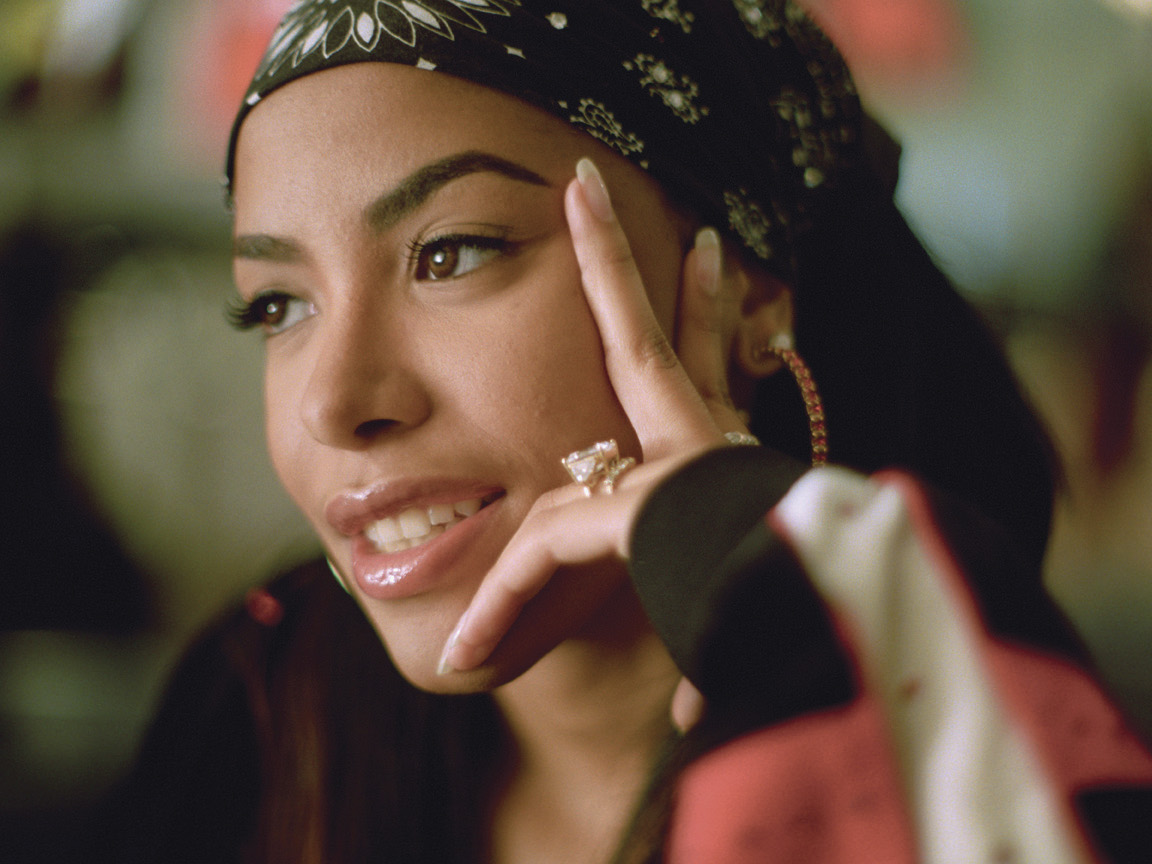
The death of Aaliyah (pictured) inspired Keys to write "If I Ain't Got You".

Keys began writing songs for what would become The Diary of Alicia Keys as early as 2001, with "If I Ain't Got You" being among the first songs written. She felt inspired to write it while on a flight, after hearing the news of Aaliyah's death in a plane crash in August 2001, as flying inside a plane against the circumstances of Aaliyah's demise presented her with a "sentiment of being present in the moment". As Christina Aguilera asked Keys to write a song for her fourth studio album Stripped (2002), Keys considered proffering "If I Ain't Got You" to her, but was persuaded otherwise by J Records' then-executive vice president of artists and repertoire (A&R) Peter Edge; Keys ultimately wrote "Impossible" for Aguilera. The songwriting for The Diary of Alicia Keys became continual during the Songs in A Minor Tour, during which Keys wrote "Dragon Days" and "Feeling U, Feeling Me". Following the tour's completion in December 2002, she began recording the album with audio engineers Ann Mincieli and Tony Black. Like Songs in A Minor, Keys executive produced The Diary of Alicia Keys, alongside Edge and her then-manager Jeff Robinson. She primarily collaborated with Kerry Brothers Jr., her former EmBishion fellow member Taneisha Smith, and songwriter Erika Rose. Brothers and Smith wrote "Karma" together while Keys was recording another track; Brothers originally produced it for an undisclosed rapper in 2000, making it the album's sole track not produced by Keys. Alongside "Karma", Brothers also co-wrote "Diary", "Wake Up", and "When You Really Love Someone". Smith co-wrote "Nobody Not Really" and eventual bonus track "Streets of New York (City Life)", while Rose co-wrote "Heartburn", "Slow Down", and "Samsonite Man".

In order to capture the desired 1960s–1970s sound on The Diary of Alicia Keys, Keys equipped her recording locations with live instruments. Initial recording sessions took place at the Kampo Studio in New York City, as Keys refrained from recording at studios frequently used by her contemporaries in order to concentrate solely on her work. "Samsonite Man" and "Nobody Not Really", which would ultimately become the album's closing tracks, were the first tracks recorded, and were used as guidelines for the remainder of the production. At Kampo, Keys also recorded the Easy Mo Bee-produced "If I Was Your Woman"/"Walk on By", a vocal cover of "If I Were Your Woman" (1970) by Gladys Knight & the Pips against an instrumental sample from Isaac Hayes' 1964 song "Walk On By". As it is a cover, it is the album's sole track not written by Keys. Keys originally recorded a standalone alternative rock-styled cover of "If I Was Your Woman" for Songs in A Minor. After the track was left unused, Keys re-recorded it against a sample from "Walk On By", inspired by Easy Mo Bee's previous production of The Notorious B.I.G.'s 1994 track "Warning". The original demo of "If I Was Your Woman" would be released via 10th anniversary editions of Songs in A Minor in 2011. Both versions were co-produced by D'Wayne Wiggins. Besides Kampo, New York recording sessions for The Diary of Alicia Keys materialized at Keys' own KrucialKeys Studios, co-founded with Brothers, as well as The Hit Factory and the Quad Recording Studios.

Apart from Easy Mo Bee, new collaborators on The Diary of Alicia Keys included Timbaland, Kanye West, and Dre & Vidal. Timbaland co-wrote and produced "Heartburn", the only track recorded at Hit Factory Criteria in Miami, while West composed and produced "You Don't Know My Name". Harold Lilly, who co-wrote it, and then-obscure John Legend contributed background vocals to the latter. Keys fortuitously met Dre & Vidal as they were working on Usher's Confessions (2004) at the same studio as her. They ultimately collaborated during a three-day session at Quad, writing and producing "So Simple" together. For "So Simple", Keys introduced her alter ego Lellow, which Keys' collaborators would refer to her as whenever she recorded influenced by hip-hop, as a "featured artist". After the Quad sessions, the track was finished at The Crib in Philadelphia. Recording and production of tracks such as "You Don't Know My Name" and "If I Ain't Got You", at The Hit Factory, was interrupted by the August 14–16, 2003 Northeast blackout. By the time The Diary of Alicia Keys reached its completion in November 2003, Keys had already embarked on the album's promotional tour across Europe. "When You Really Love Someone", "Feeling U, Feeling Me", and "Slow Down" were partly or fully recorded at Sarm West in London, while "Diary" was finished at the Soundwise Studio in Amsterdam. Stokley Williams of Mint Condition originally provided additional vocals for "Diary", before Jermaine Paul, who joined Keys as a background vocalist for the promotional tour, was chosen as the guest vocalist. "Harlem's Nocturne", the final track recorded for the album, was recorded at Plus XXX in Paris and finished at The Hit Factory in New York, where The Diary of Alicia Keys was mastered by Herb Powers, Jr.

== Musical style ==
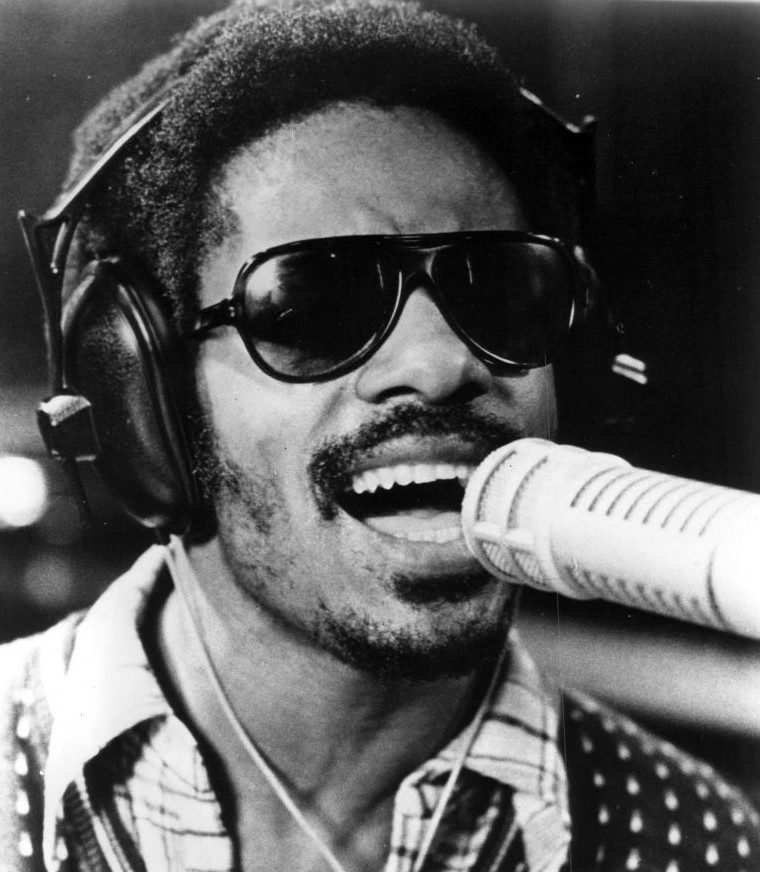
Stevie Wonder (pictured in 1973) was cited as an influence on jazz stylings of The Diary of Alicia Keys.

The Diary of Alicia Keys is predominantly a soul, R&B, contemporary classical, and hip-hop record. Its musical style is largely influenced by 1960s and 1970s soul, which Keys declared "some of the best music ever created". Critic Mark Anthony Neal observed how the album's traditional soul-oriented sound transcended the neo soul style of Songs in A Minor, while Sal Cinquemani of Slant Magazine compared the sonic amalgamation of modernism and classicism on The Diary of Alicia Keys to its predecessor. Denise Boyd of BBC described the album as an eclectic fusion of genres, from "cosmic" jazz to "sensual" salsa. The intro "Harlem's Nocturne" fuses classical piano with hip-hop drums. Integration of classical and hip-hop stylings segues into the horn-driven "Karma", whose background consists of dramatic violins, flittering strings and low-end keys interspersed with excerpts from Johannes Brahms's Violin Concerto in D major, Op. 77. Up-tempo, blaxploitation-influenced funk track "Heartburn" is built upon minimalist drums, rapid brass, and disjointed guitars. Its call-and-response chorus incorporates elements of disco, which journalist David Browne compared to Studio 54. "If I Was Your Woman"/"Walk on By" is a medley composed of Keys' piano and vocal cover of "If I Were Your Woman" by Gladys Knight & the Pips, against the instrumental excerpts from "Walk On By" by Isaac Hayes. Its musical style combines Motown-era soul with futuristic hip-hop.

In the vein of 1970s soul, "You Don't Know My Name" incorporates a sample from The Main Ingredient's "Let Me Prove My Love to You" alongside an orchestral arrangement. Blues influences are present on the jazz-R&B ballad "If I Ain't Got You", "Dragon Days", which is built upon artificial classic rock guitar licks created through a keyboard, and "Samsonite Man". Titular track "Diary" is the album's sole collaboration, featuring Tony! Toni! Toné! on guitar, bass, Wurlitzer, organ, and additional piano, as well as Jermaine Paul on vocals. BBC's Daryl Easlea described the track as "languid late-night soul", while Keys' then-manager Jeff Robinson characterized it as a gospel recording. On the synthesized hip-hop track "So Simple", Keys' vocals were partially modified to sound high-pitched and accelerated, to represent her alter ego Lellow. Critic Alexis Petridis compared the synthesizer-driven production of the jazz interlude "Feeling U, Feeling Me" to Stevie Wonder's Innervisions (1973). Wonder served as musical inspiration for the jazz outro "Nobody Not Really", whose elaborate instrumentation utilizes drums, bass, guitar, flute, horns, piano, and organ, while its production incorporates reverb effect. "Streets of New York (City Life)", included solely on UK and Japanese editions of The Diary of Alicia Keys, features guest appearances from Nas and Rakim, and contains samples from the former's "N.Y. State of Mind".

== Lyrical themes ==
The Diary of Alicia Keys is a concept album, constructed as Keys' auditory diary. In its liner notes, Keys refers to each song as a daily entry; the liner notes display excerpts from Keys' actual journal, including a poem titled "When Gone Is the Glory", which discusses the ephemerality of prominence. J Records' then-artists and repertoire (A&R) executive Peter Edge elucidated the album's titling and conceptualization as based on its personal lyricism, intimate ambience, and understated production. The album's lyrical themes primarily deal with relationship complexities, such as infatuation, devotion, confusion, and anguish. On multiple songs, Keys portrays specific characters in order to evoke the subject matter. On "You Don't Know My Name", she sings from the perspective of a waitress who becomes enamored of her customer and yearns for his attention. The six-minute track is interrupted with a spoken-word interlude, demonstrated as a phone conversation between Keys and the customer. "Dragon Days" depicts Keys as a damsel in distress, equating longing for a distant lover to days which "drag on". She portrays a soldier's partner on "Wake Up", which condemns the war on terror by using a metaphor of a romantic relationship to demonstrate agitation with the government.

"If I Was Your Woman"/"Walk on By" centers on unrequited love, with Keys addressing her love interest in a flirtatious and defiant manner, as opposed to Gladys Knight's restrained approach on "If I Were Your Woman". "If I Ain't Got You" prioritizes love over materialism, fame, and affluence. Similarly, "When You Really Love Someone" discusses unconditional love, receiving frequent comparisons to Keys' 2001 song "A Woman's Worth". Intimacy is the theme of "Diary", which encourages closeness and candor with a romantic partner, and "Slow Down", which follows a protagonist desiring to delay consummation. Meanwhile, "Karma" and "Samsonite Man" deal with situations related to a relationship's conclusion. On "Karma", Keys claims retribution on a deceitful former lover, warning him that "what goes around comes around". The titular character of "Samsonite Man" is an itinerant lover, for whom the protagonist has lost patience. Brothers retrospectively revealed that the song was Keys' lyrical expression of her relationship with her father, who abandoned Keys and her mother when Keys was two years old. Bonus track "Streets of New York (City Life)" is an affectionate ode to New York City.

Kris Ex of Blender observed Keys' vocal progression since Songs in A Minor, and an improved ability to convey lyrical sentiments, as she delivers the lines with a "shaded, complex" emotionalism. Singing "If I Was Your Woman"/"Walk on By" in a low register, she demonstrated the urgency of the song's tone, according to Dimitri Ehrlich of Vibe, while Cinquemani described her vocal performance on "Dragon Days" as "sultry, surprisingly disco-fied". Rashaun Hall of Billboard noted that, while within her vocal range on "If I Ain't Got You", Keys "stretches out vocally and with real feeling".

== Marketing and touring ==
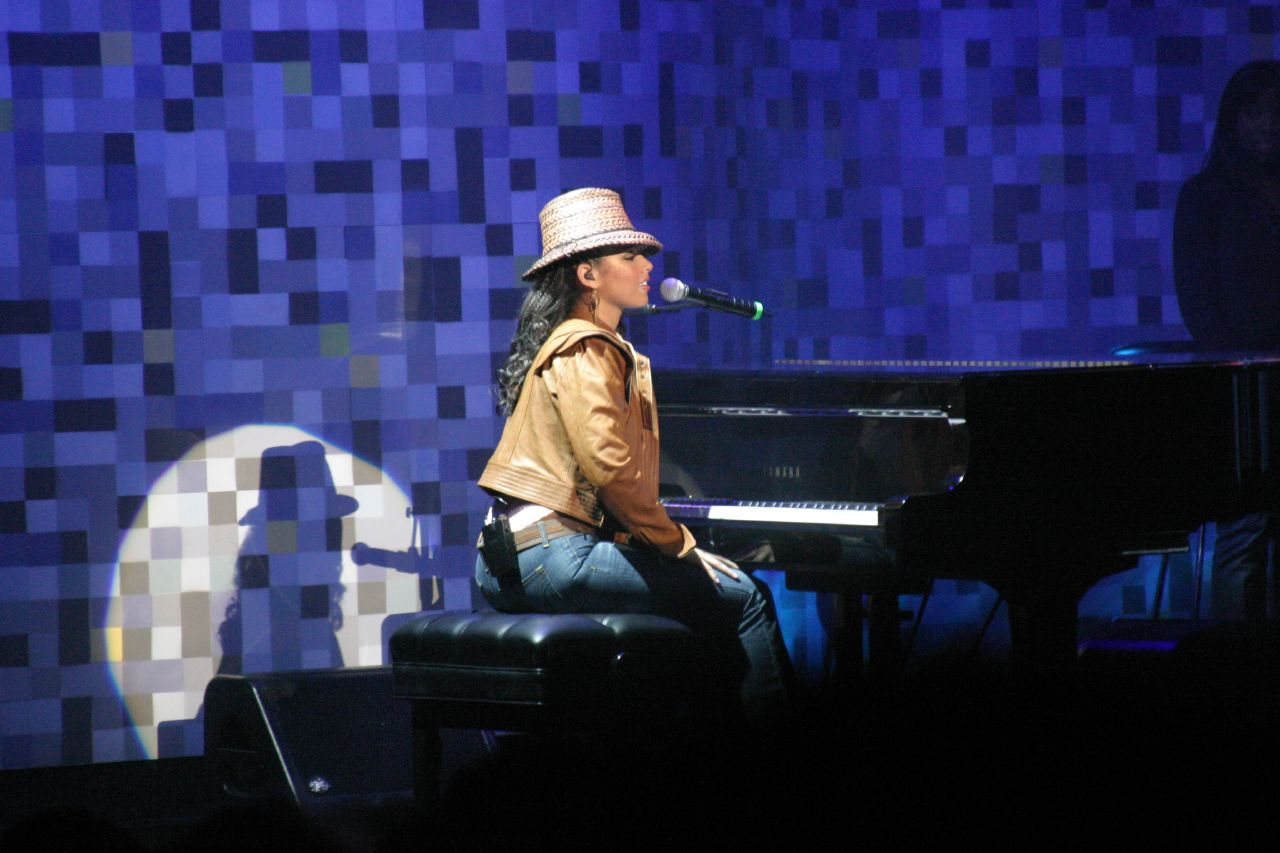
Keys performing at the Consumer Electronics Show in January 2004

According to record executive Tom Corson, the marketing campaign for The Diary of Alicia Keys integrated televised, print, and online coverage. Primarily focusing on word of mouth, the strategy was described as more understated than the exhaustive marketing campaign for Songs in A Minor. In August 2003, "Streets of New York (City Life)" leaked onto various mixtapes and radio stations, though it was promptly announced the track was not the album's lead single. Then-undisclosed lead single was announced for late September, while the album was tentatively scheduled for November 18; however, both were eventually postponed. Promotional efforts for the album would not commence until October, with Keys appearing on the cover of the October 30, 2003-dated issue of Rolling Stone alongside Missy Elliott and Eve. At a worldwide launch at the Criterion Theatre in London on November 3, Keys performed "You Don't Know My Name", "Streets of New York (City Life)", "Diary", "If I Ain't Got You", and "If I Was Your Woman"/"Walk on By". The promotional tour continued across Europe until November 13.

"You Don't Know My Name" was released as the lead single from The Diary of Alicia Keys on November 10, 2003, being selected over the crossover-appealing "If I Ain't Got You" in order to market the album to Keys' core, urban contemporary-oriented audience first. A commercial success, "You Don't Know My Name" peaked at number three on the US Billboard Hot 100 and spent nine weeks atop the Hot R&B/Hip-Hop Songs. Keys continued promoting the album by performing at the Vibe Awards on November 20, at AOL Broadband Rocks! Live on December 1, on Good Morning America on December 2, and The Tonight Show with Jay Leno on December 4 and 5, as well as appearing on Primetime and The Oprah Winfrey Show. In the US, The Diary of Alicia Keys was released on December 2, 2003, by J Records; the first one million units shipped were packaged with a bonus DVD containing behind-the-scenes footage. Internationally, its release commenced in Sweden on November 28. Despite initial contemplations of releasing "Heartburn" as the second single from The Diary of Alicia Keys, "If I Ain't Got You" was released on February 23, 2004. It became Keys' second consecutive Hot R&B/Hip-Hop Songs number one, and peaked at number four on the Billboard Hot 100. Keys embarked on the co-headlining Verizon Ladies First Tour with Beyoncé and Missy Elliott on March 12, 2004, touring across the US until April 21. After the tour's conclusion, Keys continued promoting the album with televised performances on The Tonight Show with Jay Leno on May 3, and Today on May 7.

To promote The Diary of Alicia Keys internationally, Keys performed "You Don't Know My Name", "If I Ain't Got You" and "Karma" on the May 14, 2004-dated episode of Later... with Jools Holland in the UK, held a concert in Dubai, United Arab Emirates, on May 28, and performed at various festivals across Europe throughout the summer. (Note: attributed to multiple sources) "Diary" was released as the album's third single on May 24, becoming Keys' fourth consecutive Billboard Hot 100 top-10 hit by peaking at number eight. Keys performed the song alongside "If I Ain't Got You" on The Early Show's Summer Concert Series on June 8. She later performed "If I Ain't Got You" at the BET Awards 2004 on June 29, and with Stevie Wonder at the 2004 MTV Video Music Awards on August 29. Keys performed "Heartburn" at Fashion Rocks on September 8. A double-disc special edition of The Diary of Alicia Keys was made available in select countries outside North America in September, while a video album of the same title, featuring behind-the-scenes footage chronicling the album's production and release, was released in the US on November 16. Keys headlined the Wall of Hope concert on the Great Wall of China on September 25, and commenced the Diary Tour in October, initially touring Asia and Oceania. "Karma" was released as the album's fourth and final single on October 26, peaking at number 20 on the Billboard Hot 100; Keys performed it at the 2004 Billboard Music Awards on December 8. According to the year-end Billboard Hot 100 for 2004, "If I Ain't Got You" was the chart's third biggest hit of the year, while "You Don't Know My Name" and "Diary" both placed within the top 40. Keys performed "If I Ain't Got You" at the 47th Annual Grammy Awards on February 13, 2005, before embarking on the North American leg of the Diary Tour on February 23; the tour culminated on April 24, 2005.

== Critical reception ==
Professional ratings
Aggregate scores
Source	Rating
Metacritic	71/100
Review scores
Source	Rating
Blender	4/5 stars
Entertainment Weekly	B
The Guardian	4/5 stars
Los Angeles Times	3.5/4 stars
People	4/4 stars
Q	4/5 stars
Rolling Stone	3/5 stars
Slant Magazine	4/5 stars
USA Today	4/4 stars
Vibe	4.5/5 marks

On release, The Diary of Alicia Keys received widespread critical acclaim. At Metacritic, which assigns a normalized rating out of 100 based on reviews from mainstream critics, it holds an average score of 71, based on 17 reviews, indicating "generally favorable reviews". Multiple journalists declared that the album fulfilled the high expectations set by the critical success of Songs in A Minor, while USA Today and Mark Anthony Neal in PopMatters opined that The Diary of Alicia Keys displayed Keys' artistic progression. Slant Magazine's Sal Cinquemani wrote that the album surpassed the quality of its predecessor, describing it as "a deft mix of modernism and classicism, not to mention street and class". The magazine subsequently listed the album as the ninth best of 2003, while The Washington Times proclaimed it second best.

Writing in The New York Times, Jon Pareles stated that with The Diary of Alicia Keys, Keys testified the tenacity of songwriting in soul music, noting Keys' lyrical progression since her debut. Tom Horan of The Daily Telegraph also hailed Keys' lyricism, concluding that she "summons up a wisdom and worldliness that is extraordinary in someone so young". Similarly, Rob Sheffield called the album "an assured, adult statement, steeped in the complicated love life and musical dreams of an ambitious young woman" in Rolling Stone. Robert Hilburn in Los Angeles Times and a critic from E! Online both concluded that Keys was still more accomplished as a vocalist than as a songwriter; regardless, Hilburn added that she made "each moment on the album seem real and her own". Dimitri Ehrlich of Vibe referred to the record as "masterful", complimenting Keys' vocal performance and fusion of traditional and contemporary musical elements. Roger Friedman of Fox News commended the "exquisite" production, vocals and instrumentation. Kris Ex of Blender praised the "enthusiastic album full of masterful strokes and electrifying intensity", while Q called it "a proper soul album which hooks you with the first pneumatic beat and draws you deeper with every heady atmosphere and vivid emotion." Mojo described the record as "an hour of heartful, artful singing enhanced by dense, yet fuss-free arrangements".

In less laudatory commentaries on The Diary of Alicia Keys, multiple critics emphasized the loss of invigoration throughout its second half. (Note: attributed to multiple sources) In Entertainment Weekly, David Browne said the latter part of the album "drifts into a narcotized semi-slumber of one earnest, samey retro-soul piano ballad after another", while Josh Tyrangiel of Time negatively compared it to "models of how to make nostalgic music that is not anti-present" constituting the first half. Laura Sinagra of The Village Voice felt that the album's songs lack hooks and other "surface content", instead sounding like unfinished vocal sketches. Neal said that only "fleeting glimpses" of Keys' actual sensibilities are shown, perceiving the album as recorded to appeal to mainstream audiences, thus lacking cohesion. Alexis Petridis, writing in The Guardian, found it creatively safe and marred by "anodyne slow numbers studded with knowing references to old records". Uncut and Ethan Brown in New York lambasted Keys' lyricism; the former described it as filled with a "litany of cliche and hackneyed need-a-man" wailing, while Brown wrote that the album "collapses under the weight of one song about heartbreak after another". Robert Christgau of The Village Voice rated the album a "dud", indicating "a bad record whose details rarely merit further thought".

The Diary of Alicia Keys and its tracks received nominations for a myriad of industry awards. At the 35th NAACP Image Awards (2004), it was nominated for Outstanding Album, while Keys won for Outstanding Female Artist. The album was also nominated for Favorite Soul/R&B Album at the American Music Awards of 2004, with Keys winning Favorite Soul/R&B Female Artist. At the 47th Annual Grammy Awards (2005), the album won Keys her second Grammy Award for Best R&B Album, also being nominated for Album of the Year; "You Don't Know My Name" won for Best R&B Song, while "If I Ain't Got You" was nominated for Song of the Year and won for Best Female R&B Vocal Performance. The Diary of Alicia Keys also won the 2005 Soul Train Music Award for Best R&B/Soul Album – Female, and was nominated for the 2005 Teen Choice Award for Choice Music – Album. Internationally, it earned Keys nominations for the 2004 Edison Award for International Singer, and the 2004 MOBO Award for Best Album.

In a retrospective review published via AllMusic, Stephen Thomas Erlewine described The Diary of Alicia Keys as "a seamless piece of work, a sultry slow groove that emphasizes her breathy, seductive voice and lush soulfulness". He nonetheless referred to it as inferior to Songs in A Minor, as did Tom Moon in The New Rolling Stone Album Guide (2004), and Colin Larkin in The Encyclopedia of Popular Music (2007). In The Great Rock Discography (2004), Martin C. Strong reflected on The Diary of Alicia Keys showcasing Keys' "sophistication way beyond her years", calling it a "flawless marriage of classic and contemporary black music, pure pop and singer-songwriter self examination". In 2007, The Diary of Alicia Keys was ranked at number 129 on both New York Daily News's listing of top 200 albums of all time", and Rock and Roll Hall of Fame's "Definitive 200". It was also included on the 2020 edition of Rolling Stone's 500 Greatest Albums of All Time, at number 277; the publication's staff hailed it as an improvement from its predecessor, and concluded that, despite drawing influences from Aretha Franklin and Nina Simone, it was inherently Keys' endeavor.

== Commercial performance ==
In the US, The Diary of Alicia Keys debuted atop the Billboard 200 chart dated December 20, 2003, becoming her second consecutive number-one debut. Its first-week sales of 618,000 units marked the third largest, and the largest for a female artist, of 2003. In its second week, the album descended to number two on the Billboard 200, selling 324,000 copies. It returned to the summit in its third week, with sales of 370,000 units, surpassing one million copies sold, before descending to number two again, a position on which it spent three consecutive weeks. Charting for a total of 87 weeks, the album is Keys' longest-charting on the Billboard 200. On the Top R&B/Hip-Hop Albums, the album prematurely debuted at number 61 on December 13, leaping towards the chart's summit the following week, after its first full sales-tracking week, and spending six consecutive weeks atop the chart. Its performance on the Billboard charts earned Keys a multitude of nominations at the 2004 Billboard Music Awards, including those for Billboard 200 Album of the Year, R&B/Hip-Hop Album of the Year, and R&B/Hip-Hop Albums Artist of the Year, while Keys won for Female Artist of the Year. Based on its performance on the Top R&B/Hip-Hop Albums chart, The Diary of Alicia Keys was also nominated for the 2004 Billboard/American Urban Radio Networks R&B/Hip-Hop Award for Top R&B/Hip-Hop Album. It placed fourth and second on the Billboard 200 and Top R&B/Hip-Hop Albums year-end charts for 2004, respectively. By January 2006, the album had sold 4,400,000 copies in the US. In August 2020, it was certified quintuple platinum by the Recording Industry Association of America (RIAA) for combined sales and album-equivalent units of five million in the country.

Internationally, The Diary of Alicia Keys largely failed to replicate the commercial success of Songs in A Minor. Peaking at number 15 on the Canadian Albums Chart, The Diary of Alicia Keys became Keys' lowest-peaking album in Canada, but nonetheless went on to be certified double platinum by then-Canadian Recording Industry Association (CRIA) in February 2005, for shipments of 200,000 units in the country. In the UK, the album debuted and peaked at number 13 on the UK Albums Chart, but debuted atop the UK R&B Albums Chart. It was certified platinum by the British Phonographic Industry (BPI) in January 2004, for shipments of 300,000 units in the country. Across continental Europe, the album peaked at number one in Switzerland, number two in the Netherlands, number five on the European Top 100 Albums, and within the top 10 in Finland, France, Germany, Greece, and Norway. In 2004, The Diary of Alicia Keys was certified platinum by the International Federation of the Phonographic Industry (IFPI), for sales of one million copies across Europe. In Australia, it debuted at number 43 on release, and would not reach its peak of number 22 until January 2005, as the special-edition reissue augmented the album's sales in the country. The Australian Recording Industry Association (ARIA) certified the album double platinum in 2019, denoting combined sales and album-equivalent units of 140,000 in Australia. The album peaked at number 25 in New Zealand, and went on to be certified platinum by Recorded Music NZ (RMNZ), for combined sales and album-equivalent units of 15,000 in the country. In Japan, The Diary of Alicia Keys peaked at number 27 on the Oricon Albums Chart, being certified gold by the Recording Industry Association of Japan (RIAJ) in February 2004, for shipments of 100,000 units in the country. The album was among the top 10 best-selling international albums of 2004 in Hong Kong, which won it the IFPI Hong Kong Top Sales Music Award. It was the 14th best-selling album in the world of 2003, and went on to sell over eight million copies worldwide by November 2007.

== Legacy ==
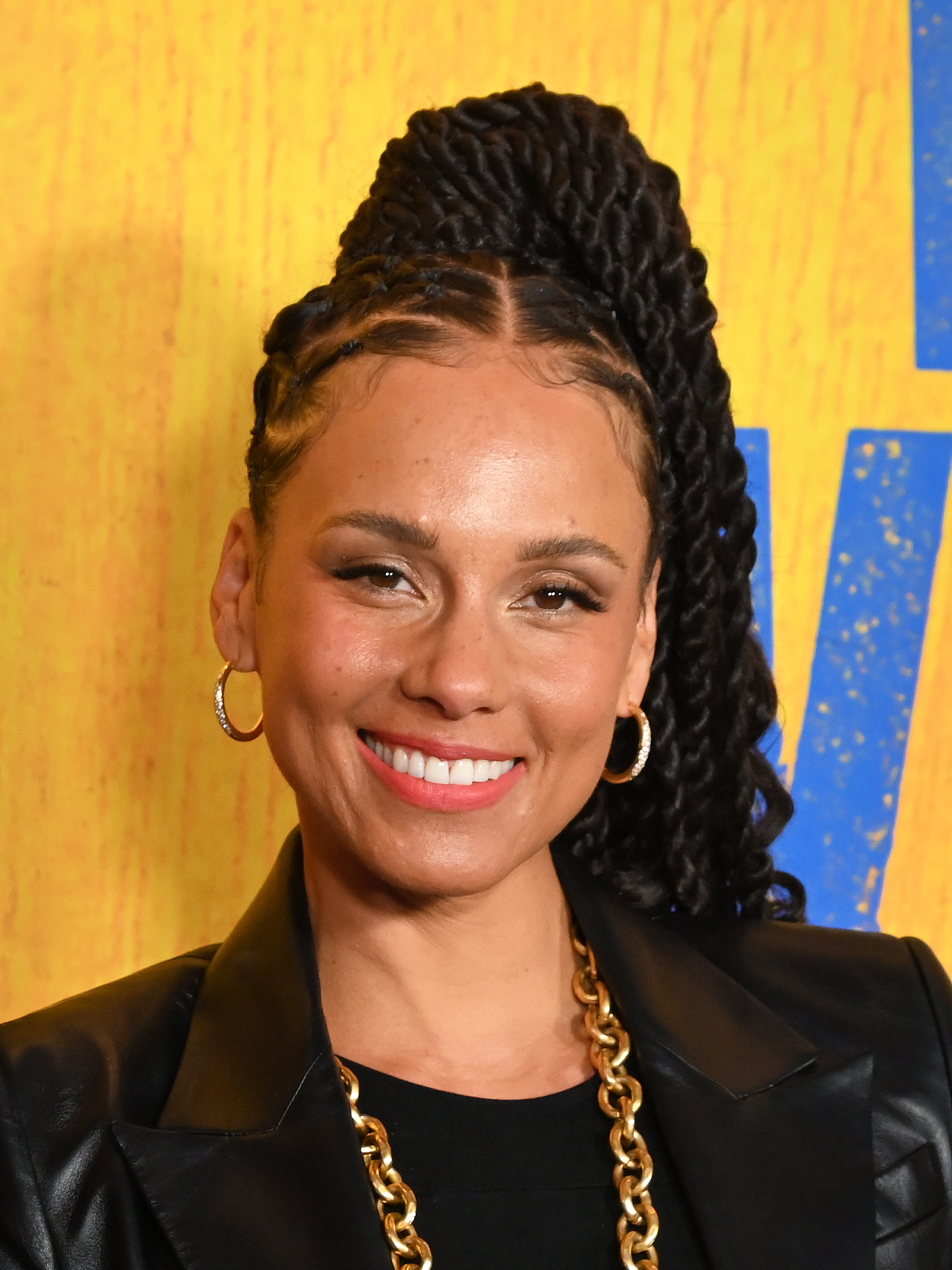
Keys in 2025

The Diary of Alicia Keys is widely considered to have refuted expectations of a sophomore slump for Keys. (Note: attributed to multiple sources) Ahead of its release, Robert Hilburn of Los Angeles Times hailed Keys' performance on the record as a "liberating break from the calculated, anonymous tone of most commercial R&B and pop these days". In December 2003, Gail Mitchell of Billboard observed that the album's strong commercial performance in its debut week contributed to the rising mainstream appeal of hip-hop and R&B. Upon the release of Keys' third studio album As I Am (2007), Chrissy Iley of The Sunday Times remarked that The Diary of Alicia Keys "confirmed her place in musical history", while Angus Batey of The Times elaborated that it laid foundations for "a career that may yet emulate the legends that her music echoes", namely Aretha Franklin, Stevie Wonder, and Prince. In 2009, Daryl Easlea of BBC wrote that it was easy to recognize the reason for the record's popularity, elaborating that "although it boasts a cast list commensurate with all urban albums of the 21st century, it is unmistakably the vision of one person".

In the aftermath of the success of The Diary of Alicia Keys, Keys pursued a variety of endeavors, and would not release her third studio album As I Am until November 2007. In March 2004, it was announced Keys planned to write a book inspired by The Diary of Alicia Keys, which was soon revealed to be a collection of her poems and lyrics titled Tears for Water. The book was released that November, accompanied by a poetry slam-themed release party hosted by Craig Grant, and featuring Kanye West, Mos Def, and Common. An autobiography titled The Diary of Alicia Keys was also announced for fall 2005, but was ultimately discarded; Keys would eventually write the autobiography More Myself (2020). In September 2004, Keys disclosed her intention to record an MTV Unplugged-inspired live album counterpart to The Diary of Alicia Keys, stating: "I love getting into the studio, but it's when you get on that stage, for me, it really translates to the people just how passionate I am about the words that I write." Keys' MTV Unplugged concert at the Brooklyn Academy of Music in July 2005 was recorded for the live album Unplugged (2005). However, instead of being a live version of The Diary of Alicia Keys, the album comprised tracks from both of her studio albums, as well as previously unreleased material. By the release of As I Am, Keys had extensively traveled to Africa as a global ambassador of Keep a Child Alive, a nonprofit organization supporting AIDS-affected communities, and made her acting debut in Smokin' Aces (2006), followed by a supporting role in The Nanny Diaries (2007). As I Am replicated the success of its predecessors, becoming Keys' fourth consecutive US Billboard 200 number-one album, following Unplugged, registering largest first-week sales of Keys' career with 742,000 units sold.

Keys' eighth studio album Keys (2021) included "Is It Insane", a track originally written and recorded for The Diary of Alicia Keys; Keys deemed it unfit for latter and attempted to adjust it into each of her subsequent albums, before including it on Keys. On November 2, 2023, it was announced that The Diary of Alicia Keys would be re-released to include nine bonus tracks, in commemoration of its 20th anniversary. One of the bonus tracks, "Golden Child", which derived from a Tears for Water poem of the same title and was recorded in 2003, was made available for digital consumption the same day. The expanded edition, titled The Diary of Alicia Keys 20, was released on December 1. Keys promoted it with a concert at Webster Hall in New York on the same date, performing the album in its entirety. At the 66th Annual Grammy Awards (2024), The Diary of Alicia Keys won Best Immersive Audio Album.

== Track listing ==
The Diary of Alicia Keys
No.	Title	Writer(s)	Producer(s)	Length
1.	"Harlem's Nocturne"	Alicia Keys	Keys; Kerry Brothers Jr.	1:43
2.	"Karma"	Brothers; Keys; Taneisha Smith	Brothers	4:16
3.	"Heartburn"	Keys; Timothy Mosley; Walter Millsap III; Candice Nelson; Erika Rose	Timbaland; Keys	3:28
4.	"If I Was Your Woman"/"Walk on By"	Gloria Jones; Clarence McMurray; Pam Sawyer; Burt Bacharach; Hal David	Keys; Easy Mo Bee; D'Wayne Wiggins	3:06
5.	"You Don't Know My Name"	Keys; Kanye West; Harold Lilly; J. R. Bailey; Mel Kent; Ken Williams	West; Keys	6:06
6.	"If I Ain't Got You"	Keys	Keys	3:48
7.	"Diary" (featuring Tony! Toni! Toné! and Jermaine Paul)	Keys; Brothers	Keys	4:45
8.	"Dragon Days"	Keys	Keys; Brothers^{[a]}	4:36
9.	"Wake Up"	Keys; Brothers	Keys	4:27
10.	"So Simple" (featuring Lellow (Note: Keys' alias))	Keys; Lilly; Andre Harris; Vidal Davis	Dre & Vidal; Keys	3:49
11.	"When You Really Love Someone"	Keys; Brothers	Keys	4:09
12.	"Feeling U, Feeling Me" (Interlude)	Keys	Keys	2:07
13.	"Slow Down"	Keys; L. Green; Rose	Keys; Kumasi	4:18
14.	"Samsonite Man"	Keys; Rose	Keys; Brothers	4:12
15.	"Nobody Not Really" (Interlude)	Keys; Smith	Keys	2:56
Total length:				57:45

Japanese and UK editions
No.	Title	Writer(s)	Producer(s)	Length
16.	"Streets of New York (City Life)" (featuring Nas and Rakim)	Keys; Smith; Eric Barrier; Nasir Jones; Chris Martin; William Griffin	DJ Premier	4:55
Total length:				62:40

The Diary of Alicia Keys 20
No.	Title	Writer(s)	Producer(s)	Length
16.	"If I Ain't Got You" (orchestral version featuring Queen Charlotte Global Orchestra)	Keys	Kris Bowers	4:54
17.	"Golden Child"	Keys	Keys	4:03
18.	"You Don't Know My Name"/"Will You Ever Know It" (Reggae Mix)	Keys; West; Lilly; Isaacs; Ruby	West; DJ Min One^{[b]}	5:05
19.	"Diary" (Hani Mixshow) (featuring Tony! Toni! Toné! and Jermaine Paul)	Keys; Brothers	Keys; Hani^{[b]}	5:10
20.	"If I Ain't Got You" (Spanish orchestral version featuring Queen Charlotte Global Orchestra)	Keys	Bowers	4:55
21.	"Streets of New York (City Life)" (AOL Broadband Rocks! Live at Webster Hall)	Keys; Smith; Barrier; Jones; Martin; Griffin		4:16
22.	"If Ain't Got You" (AOL Broadband Rocks! Live at Webster Hall)	Keys		5:09
23.	"Diary" (AOL Broadband Rocks! Live at Webster Hall)	Keys; Brothers		5:35
24.	"You Don't Know My Name" (AOL Broadband Rocks! Live at Webster Hall)	Keys; West; Lilly; Bailey; Kent; Williams		6:00

=== Notes ===
- ^{^a} signifies a co-producer.
- ^{^b} signifies an additional producer.
- Limited edition pressings include a bonus DVD with behind-the-scenes footage.
- Special edition pressings include a bonus enhanced CD containing three versions of "If I Ain't Got You"—remix featuring Usher, Spanish version featuring Arturo Sandoval, and the Kanye West remix—alongside track 18, and the music videos for tracks 5–7.
- Urban Outfitters-exclusive vinyl pressings of The Diary of Alicia Keys 20 include a bonus 7-inch vinyl, instead of the bonus tracks. The 7-inch vinyl contains "Streets of New York (City Life)" and its instrumental.

Sample credits

- "Karma" contains excerpts from Violin Concerto in D major, Op. 77 by Johannes Brahms.
- "You Don't Know My Name" contains excerpts and a sample from "Let Me Prove My Love to You" by The Main Ingredient.
- "If I Was Your Woman"/"Walk on By" is a cover of "If I Were Your Woman" by Gladys Knight & the Pips, and contains excerpts from "Walk On By" by Isaac Hayes.
- "Streets of New York (City Life)" contains a sample from "N.Y. State of Mind" by Nas.

== Personnel ==
Credits are adapted from the liner notes of The Diary of Alicia Keys.

- Sanford Allen – concertmaster (tracks 5 and 9), violin (tracks 5 and 9)
- Alli – art direction, design
- Ayako – makeup
- Burt Bacharach – songwriting (Note: original songwriter of a sampled recording) (track 4)
- J. R. Bailey – songwriting (track 5)
- Elijah Baker – bass (track 7)
- Julien Barber – viola (track 9)
- Katreese Barnes – background vocals (tracks 6 and 9)
- Pablo Batista – percussion (tracks 14 and 15)
- Tony Black – engineering (all tracks), mixing (tracks 1, 10, 12, and 15)
- Richard Brice – viola (tracks 5 and 9)
- Kurt Briggs – violin (track 5)
- Kerry Brothers Jr. – digital programming (tracks 1, 2, 6–9, 11, and 12), drums (track 14), engineering (tracks 8 and 12), instrumentation (track 2), production (tracks 1, 2, and 8), songwriting (tracks 2, 7, 9, and 11)
- Avril Brown – violin (tracks 5 and 9)
- Stockley Carmichael – background vocals (track 7)
- Fred Cash, Jr. – bass (tracks 6 and 14)
- Robert Chausow – viola (track 5)
- Ray Chew – string arrangement (tracks 5 and 9), string conducting (tracks 5 and 9)
- Hal David – songwriting (track 4)
- Dre & Vidal – instrumentation (track 10), production (track 10), songwriting (track 10)
- Ronnie Drayton – guitar (track 8)
- Vincent DiLorenzo – additional engineering (track 10)
- Darryl Dixon – horns (track 6)
- Jimmy Douglass – mixing (track 3)
- Peter Edge – executive production
- Russell Elevado – mixing (track 9)
- Marisol Espada – cello (track 9)
- Michael Evans – production coordination (track 3)
- Barry Finclair – viola (tracks 5 and 9)
- Easy Mo Bee – digital programming (track 4), production (track 4)
- Eileen Folson – cello (track 5)
- Alan Ford – mixing assistance (track 12)
- Dan Gautreau – engineering assistance (tracks 3 and 11)
- Onree Gill – Hammond B3 (track 8), Rhodes (tracks 14 and 15)
- L. Green – background vocals (tracks 6, 14, and 15), songwriting (track 13)
- Sharief Hobley – guitar (track 5)
- Andricka Hall – background vocals (track 9)
- Stanley Hunte – violin (tracks 5 and 9)
- Paul John – drums (track 15)
- Gloria Jones – songwriting (Note: original songwriter of a covered recording) (track 4)
- Steve Jordan – drums (track 6)
- Mel Kent – songwriting (track 5)
- Alicia Keys – background vocals (1–10, 12, 14, and 15), clavinet (track 1), executive production, instrumentation (tracks 8 and 9), keyboards (tracks 9 and 11), piano (tracks 1, 2, 4, 6, 7, 11, and 13–15), piano synthesizers (track 8), production (tracks 1 and 3–15), Rhodes (tracks 1, 9, and 12), songwriting (tracks 1–3 and 5–15), string arrangement (track 9), synthesizers (tracks 11–13), vocals (all tracks)
- Kumasi – additional synthesizers (track 13), digital programming (track 13), production (track 13)
- Gwendolyn Laster – violin (track 9)
- Chris LeBeau – art department production
- John Legend – background vocals (track 5)
- Harold Lilly – background vocals (track 5), songwriting (tracks 5 and 10)
- Manny Marroquin – mixing (tracks 2, 5–8, 11, 13, and 14)
- Hugh McCracken – guitar (track 6)
- Clarence McMurray – songwriting (track 4)
- Melissa Meell – cello (track 9)
- Lori Miller – violin (track 5)
- Walter Millsap III – engineering (track 3), songwriting (track 3)
- Ann Mincieli – additional engineering (tracks 5, 7–11, 13, and 14)
- Cindy Mizelle – background vocals (tracks 6 and 9)
- Candice Nelson – songwriting (track 3)
- Caryl Paisner – cello (track 5)
- Jermaine Paul – background vocals (track 7)
- William E. Pettaway, Jr. – production coordination (track 3)
- Marion Pinheiro – violin (tracks 5 and 9)
- Herb Powers, Jr. – mastering
- Ricky Quinones – guitar (tracks 14 and 15)
- Artie Reynolds – bass (track 5)
- Maxine Roach – viola (tracks 5 and 9)
- Jeff Robinson – executive production, management
- Steve "Styles" Rodriguez – bass (tracks 11, 14, and 15)
- Joe Romano – horns (tracks 2 and 6)
- Erika Rose – background vocals (tracks 3, 14, and 15), songwriting (tracks 3, 13, and 14)
- Tim Christian Riley – piano (track 7)
- Warwick Saint – photography
- Pam Sawyer – songwriting (track 4)
- Al Schoonmaker – copying (tracks 5 and 9)
- John "Jubu" Smith – guitar (track 7)
- Taneisha Smith – background vocals (track 15), songwriting (tracks 2 and 15)
- George Spivey – turntables
- Denise Stoudmire – background vocals (track 3)
- Dale Stuckenbruck – violin (tracks 5 and 9)
- Timbaland – production (track 3), songwriting (track 3)
- Nicole Tucker – hair
- Rabeka Tuinei – mixing assistance (track 14)
- Peter VanDerwater – viola (track 9)
- Pat Viala – mixing (track 4)
- Wouri Vice – styling assistance
- Arcell Vickers – organ (tracks 6, 14, and 15)
- Alexander Vselensky – violin (tracks 5 and 9)
- David Watson – flute (track 15), horns (tracks 2 and 6), saxophone (track 15)
- Willie Weeks – bass (track 9)
- Kanye West – production (track 5), songwriting (track 5)
- Carl "Rev" Wheeler – organ (track 7), Wurlitzer (track 7)
- Artie White – guitar (tracks 11 and 13)
- D'wayne Wiggins – bass (track 4), guitar (track 7), production (track 4), sitar (track 4)
- Ken Williams – songwriting (track 5)
- Jessica Wilson – background vocals (track 3)
- Patti Wilson – styling
- Xin Zhao – violin (track 5)

== Charts ==
=== Weekly charts ===
2003–2005 weekly chart performance
Chart	Peak position
Australian Albums (ARIA)	22
Australian Urban Albums (ARIA)	3
Austrian Albums (Ö3 Austria)	25
Belgian Albums (Ultratop Flanders)	13
Belgian Albums (Ultratop Wallonia)	25
Canadian Albums (Nielsen SoundScan)	15
Canadian R&B Albums (Nielsen SoundScan)	1
Danish Albums (Hitlisten)	16
Dutch Albums (Album Top 100)	2
European Top 100 Albums (Billboard)	5
Finnish Albums (Suomen virallinen lista)	9
French Albums (SNEP)	5
German Albums (Offizielle Top 100)	10
Greek International Albums (IFPI)	8
Irish Albums (IRMA)	37
Italian Albums (FIMI)	20
Japanese Albums (Oricon)	27
Japanese Albums (Oricon) Special edition	50
New Zealand Albums (RMNZ)	25
Norwegian Albums (VG-lista)	7
Polish Albums (ZPAV)	19
Portuguese Albums (AFP)	23
Scottish Albums (Official Charts)	33
Spanish Albums (PROMUSICAE)	32
Swedish Albums (Sverigetopplistan)	24
Swiss Albums (Schweizer Hitparade)	1
UK Albums (Official Charts)	13
UK R&B Albums (Official Charts)	1
US Billboard 200	1
US Top R&B/Hip-Hop Albums (Billboard)	1

=== Monthly charts ===
2003 monthly chart performance
Chart	Peak position
South Korean International Albums (RIAK)	7

=== Year-end charts ===
2003 year-end chart performance
Chart	Position
Dutch Albums (Album Top 100)	58
French Albums (SNEP)	122
UK Albums (OCC)	75
Worldwide Albums (IFPI)	14

2004 year-end chart performance
Chart	Position
Australian Albums (ARIA)	82
Australian Urban Albums (ARIA)	10
Belgian Albums (Ultratop Flanders)	58
Belgian Albums (Ultratop Wallonia)	99
Dutch Albums (Album Top 100)	5
French Albums (SNEP)	23
German Albums (Offizielle Top 100)	52
Swiss Albums (Schweizer Hitparade)	22
UK Albums (OCC)	72
US Billboard 200	4
US Top R&B/Hip-Hop Albums (Billboard)	2
Worldwide Albums (IFPI)	49

2005 year-end chart performance
Chart	Position
Australian Albums (ARIA)	63
Australian Urban Albums (ARIA)	9
US Billboard 200	84
US Top R&B/Hip-Hop Albums (Billboard)	45

=== Decade-end charts ===
2000s decade-end chart performance
Chart	Position
Dutch Albums (Album Top 100)	48
US Billboard 200	55
US Top R&B/Hip-Hop Albums (Billboard)	39

=== Centurial charts ===
21st century chart performance
Chart	Position
US Billboard 200	196

=== All-time charts ===
All-time chart performance
Chart	Position
US Billboard 200 (Women)	100

== Certifications ==
Certifications and sales
Region	Certification	Certified units/sales
Argentina (CAPIF)	Gold	20,000^{^}
Australia (ARIA)	2× Platinum	140,000^{‡}
Belgium (BRMA)	Gold	25,000^{*}
Canada (Music Canada)	2× Platinum	200,000^{^}
Denmark (IFPI Danmark)	Platinum	20,000^{‡}
France (SNEP)	Gold	100,000^{*}
Germany (BVMI)	Platinum	200,000^{^}
Italy (FIMI)	Gold	50,000^{*}
Japan (RIAJ)	Gold	100,000^{^}
Netherlands (NVPI)	Platinum	80,000^{^}
New Zealand (RMNZ)	Platinum	15,000^{‡}
Norway (IFPI Norway)	Gold	20,000^{*}
Singapore (RIAS)	Gold	5,000^{*}
South Korea	—	7,242
Sweden (GLF)	Gold	30,000^{^}
Switzerland (IFPI Switzerland)	Platinum	40,000^{^}
United Kingdom (BPI)	Platinum	300,000^{^}
United States (RIAA)	5× Platinum	5,000,000^{‡}
Summaries
Europe (IFPI)	Platinum	1,000,000^{*}
Worldwide	—	8,000,000
^{*} Sales figures based on certification alone.^{^} Shipments figures based on certification alone.^{‡} Sales+streaming figures based on certification alone.

== Release history ==
Release dates and formats
Region	Date	Edition(s)	Format(s)	Label(s)	Ref.
Sweden	November 28, 2003	Standard	CD	BMG	
France	November 30, 2003	Standard	CD	BMG	
Argentina	December 1, 2003	Standard	CD	BMG	
Australia	December 1, 2003	Standard	CD	BMG	
Germany	December 1, 2003	Standard	CD	BMG	
United Kingdom	December 1, 2003	Standard	CD	J	
United States	December 2, 2003	Standard; limited	Cassette; CD; CD + DVD	J	
Japan	December 3, 2003	Standard	CD	BMG	
South Korea	December 8, 2003	Standard	Cassette; CD	BMG	
United States	December 16, 2003	Standard	Vinyl	J	
Japan	December 17, 2003	Limited	CD + DVD	BMG	
Australia	September 6, 2004	Special	CD + enhanced CD	Sony BMG	
Sweden	September 15, 2004	Special	CD + enhanced CD	Sony BMG	
Japan	September 22, 2004	Special	CD + enhanced CD	Sony BMG	
United Kingdom	October 4, 2004	Special	CD + enhanced CD	J	
Germany	October 25, 2004	Special	CD + enhanced CD	Sony BMG	
Various	December 1, 2023	20	Digital download; streaming	Legacy; RCA	
United States	December 1, 2023	20	Vinyl + 7-inch vinyl (Note: exclusive to Urban Outfitters)	Legacy	
Australia	July 12, 2024	Standard	Vinyl	Sony	
Europe	July 12, 2024	Standard	Vinyl	Sony	

== See also ==
- Alicia Keys discography
- List of Billboard 200 number-one albums of 2003
- List of Billboard 200 number-one albums of 2004
- List of Billboard number-one R&B albums of 2003
- List of Billboard number-one R&B albums of 2004
- List of UK R&B Albums Chart number ones of 2003
