= Tony Black (music producer) =

American record producer

Tony Black is a Grammy-winning music producer, mixer/engineer & songwriter/musician. He has contributed to recordings totaling more than 80 million units sold or downloaded. He won a Grammy Award for Best R&B Album for his contribution to the album The Diary of Alicia Keys. He also mixed and recorded "Ride or Die" on Jay-Z's Grammy-winning album Vol. 2... Hard Knock Life.

Based in New York City, Black was a staff engineer at The Hit Factory from 1993 to 1998 where he worked with artists such as: Michael Jackson, Luther Vandross, Lil' Kim, Notorious B.I.G., Jay-Z, Nas, Wu Tang Clan and hundreds of other artists.

After leaving The Hit Factory staff, he continues producing and engineering projects for numerous artists and record labels. He was featured in the web series "Create or Else" by Ogilvy showcasing his abstract painting.
