= Ofentse Pitse =

South African conductor

Ofentse Pitse (born 1 July 1992) is a South African conductor and architect. She is the first black South African woman to conduct and own an all-black orchestra, Anchored Sound. She is also the youngest to do so.

== Life ==
Dikeledi Ofentse Keorapetse Pitse was born in Mabopane. Her grandfather Otto Pitse was a jazz conductor and trumpet player. She first played an instrument at the age of twelve when an uncle gave her a flugelhorn. She played in the Salvation Army band in Mabopane, though much of her musical education was informal despite having attended the prestigious art school, Pro Arte Alphen Park. Pitse's reason for not taking music as a formal subject in school is because she was denied the opportunity to do so as she did not have a piano at home which was a requirement of the school's music programme.

In 2017, Pitse started a youth choir in Katlehong, hand-picking classically trained young people. Discovering that there was no all-black classical orchestra in the world, Pitse grew the choir into an orchestra. Boosted by established classical musicians, the ensemble grew from 8 to 19 to a 40-piece symphony orchestra. In 2019 Pitse contacted Thamsanqa Zungu, head of music at Tshwane University of Technology (TUT), and Gerben Grooten, the conductor of the University of Pretoria Philharmonic, who each provided her with mentoring in conducting. By 2021 Anchored Sound consisted of a 45-piece orchestra and 30-member choir, and had tackled music from Sibelius to Vivaldi to Dvořák. Pitse has kept the orchestra practicing though the COVID-19 pandemic, though orchestra members in disadvantaged communities have faced especial technological challenges.

In June 2024, Pitse conducted Redbull Symphonic Orchestra by Kabza De Small held at Johannesburg, Gold Reef City from June 8—9.
