= You Don't Know My Name =

2003 single by Alicia Keys

Single by Alicia Keys

from the album The Diary of Alicia Keys
- B-side: "Diary"
- Released: November 10, 2003
- Recorded: August 2003
- Studio: Kampo; Quad (New York)
- Genre: R&B; soul
- Length: 6:06
- Label: J
- Songwriters: Alicia Keys; Kanye West; Harold Lilly; J. R. Bailey; Mel Kent; Ken Williams
- Producers: Kanye West; Alicia Keys

Alicia Keys singles chronology
"Girlfriend" (2002)	"You Don't Know My Name" (2003)	"If I Ain't Got You" (2004)

Music video
- "You Don't Know My Name" on YouTube

"You Don't Know My Name" is a song recorded by American singer-songwriter Alicia Keys for her second studio album The Diary of Alicia Keys (2003). Written by Keys, Kanye West and Harold Lilly, its production, handled by the former two, is based on a sample of the 1975 song "Let Me Prove My Love to You", written by J. R. Bailey, Mel Kent and Ken Williams, and performed by the Main Ingredient. "You Don't Know My Name" was released as the lead single from The Diary of Alicia Keys on November 10, 2003, by J Records.

"You Don't Know My Name" became Keys' third top-ten hit in the United States, peaking at number three on the Billboard Hot 100, as well as topping the Hot R&B/Hip-Hop Songs for eight consecutive weeks. Critically acclaimed, the song won a Grammy Award for Best R&B Song and a Soul Train Music Award for Best R&B/Soul Single, Female. It was sampled on rapper Lil Wayne's 2008 song "Comfortable", featuring Babyface and produced by West.

== Background ==
"You Don't Know My Name" was written by Alicia Keys, Kanye West and Harold Lilly for her second studio album, The Diary of Alicia Keys (2003), while production was overseen by Keys and West. The song samples several portions from the 1975 song "Let Me Prove My Love to You" as performed by American soul and R&B group the Main Ingredient, including the vocal backgrounds and the piano, itself an interpolation of Frédéric Chopin's piano etude Winter Wind. Due to the sample, J. R. Bailey, Mel Kent and Ken Williams are also listed as songwriters. "You Don't Know My Name" marked the first collaboration between Keys and West. Lyrically, the song captures a woman's frustration and heartache as she yearns for a man’s recognition and affection, reflecting the struggles of pursuing someone who may not feel the same way. Introducing this song at a concert in Manchester, England, in 2012, Alicia Keys explained: "It's about that feeling you have when you see somebody that you really, really like, or at least you think you do. And you're trying to figure out, 'how am I supposed to say anything to this person? How am I supposed to introduce myself and get the story started?' It's not an easy thing to do. So maybe you could say something like this."

== Critical reception ==
In a review for The Diary of Alicia Keys, Denise Boyd from BBC Music noted that "You Don't Know My Name" was "clearly the stand-out track. This is Alicia Keys at her best, sweet and soulful with a hint of the tickling piano keys – pure pleasure." In a critical review of The Diary of Alicia Keys, Mark Anthony Neal from PopMatters called the song the album's "singular moment of brilliance." He found that it was "another example of the real-deal hype surrounding Chi-town producer Kanye West [...] that could make Isaac Hayes, Teddy Pendergrass, David Porter and the late Barry White all blush praise. Choosing the song as the lead single is both a testament to J's faith in Keys as a pop artist and an admission that "You Don't Know My Name" is as good as pop-soul gets." Today described "You Don't Know My Name" as "vastly appealing retro-soul as Keys is both bold and coy, calling a man who has caught her eye to plead her romantic case."

Jim Cooper, writing for SFGate, remarked: "On "You Don't Know My Name," Keys' rich voice floats over sweet Burt Bacharach-influenced strings and cascading harmonies. And even though she throws in a cheap spoken-word thing halfway through, it still ranks right alongside the previous record's hair-raising moments like "A Woman's Worth" and "Rock Wit U"." Billboard noted: "If this single is any indication of what's to come [on The Diary of Alicia Keys, fans will be thrilled [...] With creamy harmonizing on background vocals and cascading piano riffs, the Keys- and Kanye West- produced midtempo track is reminiscent of '60s-era ballads [...] While Keys' dialogue during the bridge is a little forced, the girl-next-door lyric and sweet sentiment more than compensate. Mainstream and adult R&B radio stations will undoubtedly jump on this one, based on Keys' solid track record and they won't be sorry."

=== Rankings ===
Blender placed the song at number 37 on its list of the 100 best songs of 2004. Pitchfork ranked "You Don't Know My Name/Will You Ever Know It? (Reggae Remix)" at number twenty-three on their list of Top 50 Singles of 2004. In August 2025, the song was ranked at number 85 on Billboard's list of Top R&B/Rap Songs of the 21st Century.

== Music video ==
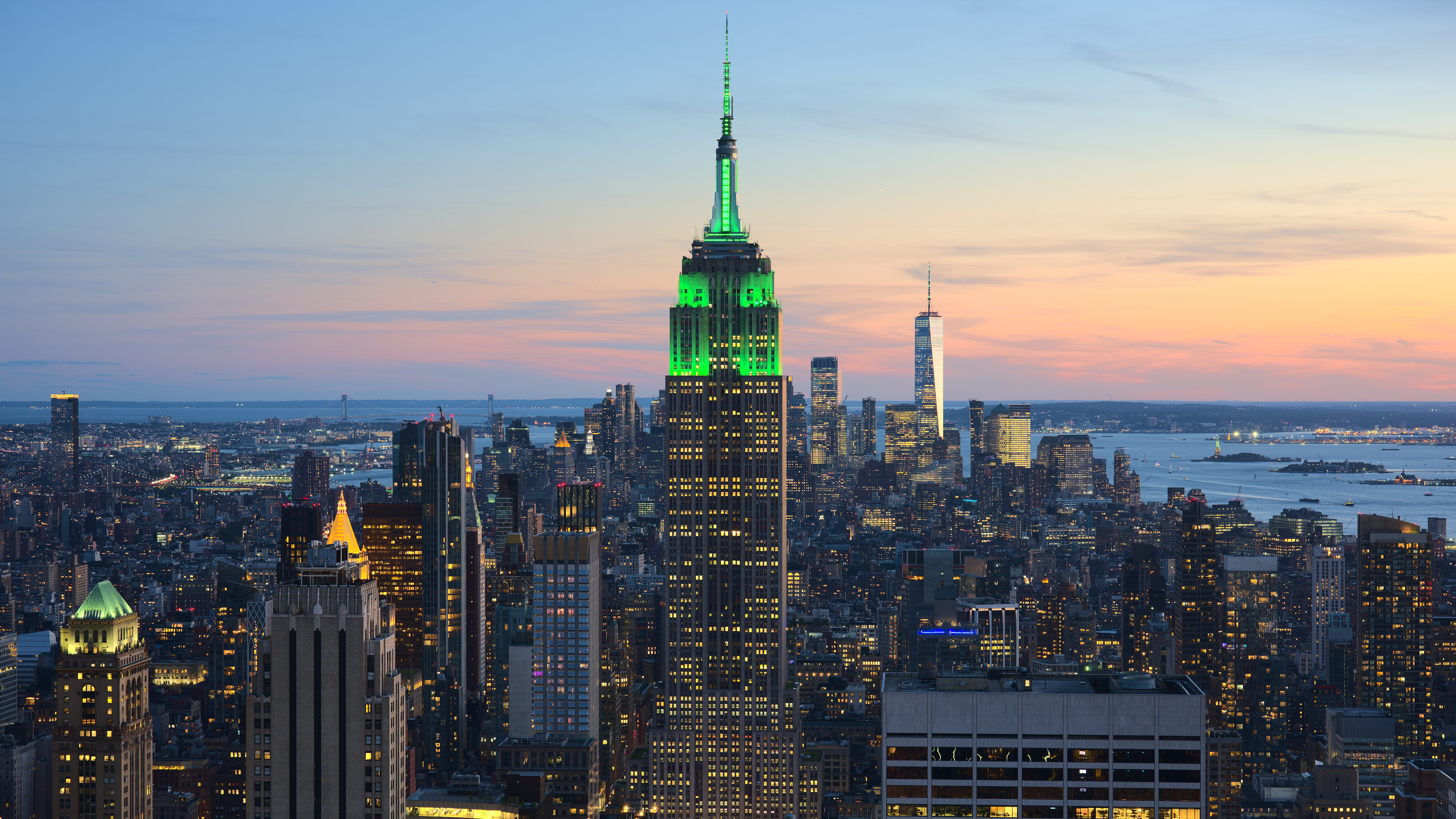
The music video for "You Don't Know My Name" was largely filmed in Harlem, New York City.

A music video for "You Don't Know My Name" was directed by Chris Robinson and Andrew Young. Filming took place in the Harlem neighborhood in Upper Manhattan, New York City, particularly inside the Pan Pan Diner at the corner of 135th Street and Lenox Avenue. It depicts Keys as a restaurant waitress, while rapper Yasiin Bey plays Michael Harris, her love interest. Taneisha Smith, one of Keys' partners from her former girl group, who co-wrote on several tracks on The Diary of Alicia Keys, was supposed to play the video's second character but due to her pregnancy her role was taken over by actress Melyssa Ford.

The visuals follows Keys working at a café. One day, Keys meets a man (played by Yasiin Bey) in the café, and she falls in love with him. Later on, Keys is at a house party where she runs into that same man when a fight is about to break out, and the scene resembles the house party scene in the movie Cooley High. Later in the video, Keys imagines getting the courage to call him and to tell him about her feelings. However, at the end of the movie, she remembers his order but there is no other recognition and the scene ends with his card still being in the bowl and Keys staring out the window since she will never be able to reveal her true feelings for the man.

== Track listings and formats ==
- US 7-inch single

A. "You Don't Know My Name" (radio version) — 4:26
B. "You Don't Know My Name" (instrumental version) — 4:27

- US 12-inch single

A1. "You Don't Know My Name" (radio mix) — 4:26
A2. "You Don't Know My Name" (instrumental) — 4:27
B1. "You Don't Know My Name" (album mix) — 6:08
B2. "You Don't Know My Name" (acappella) — 4:26

- Canadian and European CD single
1. "You Don't Know My Name" — 5:28
2. "Diary" (featuring Tony! Toni! Toné!) — 4:45
- UK CD single
1. "You Don't Know My Name" — 4:20
2. "Fallin'" (Ali soundtrack version) — 4:30
- European enhanced CD single
1. "You Don't Know My Name" — 4:20
2. "Fallin'" (Ali soundtrack version) — 4:30
3. "Butterflyz" (Roger's Release Mix) — 3:54
4. "You Don't Know My Name" (video)
- European CD maxi-single
1. "You Don't Know My Name" — 5:28
2. "Diary" (featuring Tony! Toni! Toné!) — 4:45
3. "You Don't Know My Name" (instrumental version) — 4:27
- European 12-inch single

A1. "You Don't Know My Name" (radio edit) — 3:07
A2. "Fallin'" (Ali soundtrack version) — 6:08
B1. "You Don't Know My Name" (instrumental version) — 4:27

== Personnel ==
- Alicia Keys – producer, vocals, background vocals
- Sanford Allen – concertmaster, violin
- Tony Black – engineer
- Richard Brice – viola
- Kurt Briggs – violin
- Avril Brown – violin
- Robert Chausow – viola
- Ray Chew – string conductor, string arrangements
- Barry Finclair – viola
- Eileen Folson – cello
- Sharief Hobley – guitar
- Stanley Hunte – violin
- John Legend – background vocals
- Harold Lilly – background vocals
- Manny Marroquin – mixing
- Lori Miller – violin
- Ann Mincieli – engineer
- Caryl Paisner – cello
- Marion Pinheiro – violin
- Herb Powers Jr. – mastering
- Artie Reynolds – bass guitar
- Maxine Roach – viola
- Alexander Vselensky – violin
- Kanye West – producer
- Xin Zhao – violin

== Charts ==
=== Weekly charts ===
2003–2004 weekly chart performance
Chart	Peak position
Austria (Ö3 Austria Top 40)	48
Belgium (Ultratip Bubbling Under Flanders)	2
Belgium (Ultratip Bubbling Under Wallonia)	2
Canada (Nielsen SoundScan)	22
Croatia (HRT)	1
France (SNEP)	43
Germany (GfK)	68
Ireland (IRMA)	33
Italy (FIMI)	17
Netherlands (Dutch Top 40)	9
Netherlands (Single Top 100)	20
Romania (Romanian Top 100)	94
Scottish Singles Sales (Official Charts)	35
Sweden (Sverigetopplistan)	54
Switzerland (Schweizer Hitparade)	26
UK Singles (Official Charts)	19
UK Hip Hop/R&B (Official Charts)	2
US Billboard Hot 100	3
US Hot R&B/Hip-Hop Songs (Billboard)	1
US Pop Airplay (Billboard)	31
US Rhythmic Airplay (Billboard)	11
US CHR/Pop (Radio & Records)	28
US CHR/Rhythmic (Radio & Records)	6
US Urban (Radio & Records)	1
US Urban AC (Radio & Records)	1

=== Year-end charts ===
2003 year-end chart performance
Chart	Position
US Urban AC (Radio & Records)	88

2004 year-end chart performance
Chart	Position
Brazil (Crowley)	55
US Billboard Hot 100	29
US Hot R&B/Hip-Hop Songs (Billboard)	6
US Rhythmic (Billboard)	65
US CHR/Rhythmic (Radio & Records)	63
US Urban (Radio & Records)	17
US Urban AC (Radio & Records)	8

=== Decade-end charts ===
2000s decade-end chart performance
Chart	Position
US Hot R&B/Hip-Hop Songs (Billboard)	38

== Certifications ==
Certifications and sales
Region	Certification	Certified units/sales
New Zealand (RMNZ)	Platinum	30,000^{‡}
United Kingdom (BPI)	Silver	200,000^{‡}
United States (RIAA)	Platinum	1,000,000^{‡}
^{‡} Sales+streaming figures based on certification alone.

== Release history ==
Release dates and formats
Region	Date	Format(s)	Label(s)	Ref.
United States	November 10, 2003	Rhythmic contemporary radio; urban adult contemporary radio; urban contemporary radio	J	
Germany	November 24, 2003	Maxi CD	BMG	
France	November 25, 2003	Maxi CD	J	
Sweden	November 26, 2003	CD	BMG	
United States	December 1, 2003	Contemporary hit radio	J	
United Kingdom	December 8, 2003	12-inch vinyl; CD; maxi CD	J	
France	March 2, 2004	CD	J	
Canada	March 16, 2004	Maxi CD	BMG	
Various	December 1, 2023	Digital download; streaming (EP)	Sony	

== See also ==
- Billboard Year-End Hot 100 singles of 2004
- List of number-one R&B singles of 2004 (U.S.)
