= Eileen Folson =

American musician

Eileen M. Folson
- Born: Eileen M. Garden; 1956; Philadelphia, Pennsylvania, United States
- Died: February 4, 2007 (aged 50–51)
- Genres: Classical; Broadway
- Occupations: Composer; Cellist
- Instrument: Cello
- Award: Grammy Award nomination

Eileen M. Folson (born Eileen M. Garden, 1956 – February 4, 2007) was a Broadway composer, professional cellist, and a Grammy nominee.

== Early life and education ==
Folson was born in 1956 as the fourth of six children. She began playing piano at around age 5 and took up her brother's trumpet after he quit, with an interest in becoming a jazz bassoonist.

Although the cello eventually became her major instrument, she was able to play several other instruments. At the Philadelphia High School for Girls, she learned how to play harp, bassoon, cello, piano, and trumpet. She chose to focus on the cello, although she continued to play the trumpet in the bands that she played in with brothers Earl and Mark. Folson then attended the Settlement Music School in Philadelphia on scholarship, followed by University of Michigan in Ann Arbor, Michigan where she earned both her Bachelor of Music and her Master of Music in cello performance.

== Professional career ==
Folson's professional career began when she was chosen to apprentice with the New York Philharmonic Orchestra under the baton of Zubin Mehta. She first appeared as a student soloist with the Philadelphia Orchestra at the age of 17. Her professional accomplishments include:

- New York Philharmonic Orchestra Fellow
- Broadway musician (including Phantom of the Opera, Into the Woods, Ragtime, The Lion King and Side Show)
- Grammy-nominated composer (J.J'S Jam from the album USQ Just Wait a Minute!)
- Studio musician (including Mary J. Blige, Lauryn Hill, Alicia Keys and Mýa)
- Orchestral musician (Alicia Keys, Gladys Knight, Max Roach and the Double Quartet, The Uptown String Quartet, The Black Swan String Quartet)
- Television appearances (The Bill Cosby Show; Mr. Roger's Neighborhood)
- Touring musician (Luther Vandross)

== Personal life ==
Eileen Folsom was married for 28 years to Jack Folson; they had two children. She attended the First Baptist Church of Hillside. She died on February 4, 2007.
