= Karma (Alicia Keys song) =

2004 single by Alicia Keys

Single by Alicia Keys

from the album The Diary of Alicia Keys
- B-side: "Diary"
- Released: October 26, 2004
- Studio: KrucialKeys; Quad (New York)
- Genre: R&B; alternative hip-hop; classical
- Length: 4:16
- Label: J
- Songwriters: Alicia Keys; Kerry Brothers Jr.; Taneisha Smith
- Producer: Kerry Brothers Jr.

Alicia Keys singles chronology
| "My Boo" (2004) | "Karma" (2004) | "Unbreakable" (2005) |

Music video
- "Karma" on YouTube

"Karma" is a song recorded by American singer-songwriter Alicia Keys for her second studio album The Diary of Alicia Keys (2003). Written by Keys, Kerry Brothers Jr., and Taneisha Smith, the song takes influence from hip-hop and classical music. It was released as the fourth and final single from The Diary of Alicia Keys on October 26, 2004, by J Records. Peaking at number 20 on the US Billboard Hot 100 and number 17 on the US Hot R&B/Hip-Hop Songs, it is the album's only single not to top a Billboard chart.

== Composition ==
Sheet music for "Karma" sets the key of D minor with a tempo of 100bpm.

== Music video ==
The music video for "Karma", directed by Chris Robinson and Keys herself, was filmed over three days in August 2004, with parts shot in New York City and at Casa de Campo resort's Altos de Chavón amphitheatre, in La Romana, Dominican Republic. At the 2005 MTV Video Music Awards, the video earned Keys the award for Best R&B Video.

== Track listings and formats ==
- US 12-inch single

A1. "Karma" (album version) – 4:12
A2. "Karma" (instrumental) – 4:11
B1. "Karma" (KrucialKeys DJ mix) – 3:20
B2. "Karma" (acappella) – 3:45

- European CD single
1. "Karma" – 4:15
2. "Diary" (Hani mix) – 3:49

- European CD maxi-single
1. "Karma" (radio edit) – 3:37
2. "Diary" (Hani mix) – 3:49
3. "Karma" (the Reggaeton mix) – 3:32
4. "Karma" (club mix) – 3:18
5. "Karma" (video)

== Personnel ==
- Alicia Keys – lead vocals, backing vocals, piano
- Kerry "Krucial" Brothers – producer, digital programming, engineer, instrumentation
- Manny Marroquin – mixing
- Herb Powers Jr. – mastering
- Joe Romano – horn
- David Watson – horn

== Charts ==
=== Weekly charts ===
2004–2005 weekly chart performance
| Chart | Peak position |
|---|---|
| Belgium (Ultratop 50 Flanders) | 40 |
| Belgium (Ultratip Bubbling Under Wallonia) | 2 |
| Canada CHR/Pop Top 30 (Radio & Records) | 7 |
| Canada Hot AC Top 30 (Radio & Records) | 8 |
| Finland (Suomen virallinen lista) | 6 |
| Germany (GfK) | 62 |
| Greece (IFPI) | 31 |
| Netherlands (Dutch Top 40) | 27 |
| Netherlands (Single Top 100) | 40 |
| Switzerland (Schweizer Hitparade) | 71 |
| US Billboard Hot 100 | 20 |
| US Hot R&B/Hip-Hop Songs (Billboard) | 17 |
| US Pop Airplay (Billboard) | 3 |
| US Rhythmic Airplay (Billboard) | 18 |

=== Year-end charts ===
2005 year-end chart performance
| Chart | Position |
|---|---|
| US Billboard Hot 100 | 56 |
| US Hot R&B/Hip-Hop Songs (Billboard) | 38 |
| US Pop Airplay (Billboard) | 25 |
| US Rhythmic Airplay (Billboard) | 88 |

== Certifications ==
Certifications and sales
| Region | Certification | Certified units/sales |
|---|---|---|
| United States (RIAA) | Gold | 500,000^{^} |
| United States (RIAA) Reissue | Gold | 500,000^{‡} |
^{^} Shipments figures based on certification alone.^{‡} Sales+streaming figures based on certification alone.

== Release history ==
Release dates and formats
| Region | Date | Format(s) | Label(s) | Ref. |
|---|---|---|---|---|
| United States | October 26, 2004 | 12-inch vinyl | J | |
| United States | November 1, 2004 | Urban adult contemporary radio; urban contemporary radio | J | |
| United States | November 8, 2004 | Rhythmic contemporary radio | J | |
| United States | November 22, 2004 | Contemporary hit radio | J | |
| Germany | February 7, 2005 | CD; maxi CD | Sony BMG | |
| Various | December 1, 2023 | Digital download; streaming (EP) | Sony | |

== See also ==
- Billboard Year-End Hot 100 singles of 2005
