= List of Billboard Hot 100 top-ten singles in 2004 =

This is a list of singles that charted in the top ten of the Billboard Hot 100 during 2004.

Usher scored five top ten hits during the year with "Yeah!", "Burn", "Confessions Part II", "My Boo", and "Lovers & Friends", the most among all other artists.

== Top-ten singles ==
Key

- ↑ – indicates single's top 10 entry was also its Hot 100 debut
- † – indicates Best performing song of the year
- (#) – 2004 year-end top 10 single position and rank

Top ten entry date	Single	Artist	Peak	Peak date	Weeks in top ten
Singles from 2003
November 8	"The Way You Move" (#5)	Outkast featuring Sleepy Brown	1	February 14	21
December 20	"You Don't Know My Name"	Alicia Keys	3	January 31	11
Singles from 2004
January 3	"Me, Myself and I"	Beyoncé	4	February 21	11
January 3	"Slow Jamz"	Twista featuring Kanye West and Jamie Foxx	1	February 21	13
January 31	"It's My Life"	No Doubt	10	January 31	2
January 31	"Someday"	Nickelback	7	February 14	4
January 31	"Yeah!" † (#1)	Usher featuring Lil Jon and Ludacris	1	February 28	24
February 14	"Hotel"	Cassidy featuring R. Kelly	4	March 27	9
February 14	"Salt Shaker"	Ying Yang Twins featuring Lil Jon & the East Side Boyz	9	February 14	2
February 21	"Sorry 2004"	Ruben Studdard	9	February 28	4
February 28	"One Call Away"	Chingy featuring J-Weav	2	March 13	9
February 28	"Tipsy"	J-Kwon	2	April 17	12
March 6	"Splash Waterfalls"	Ludacris	6	March 20	6
March 20	"Dirt off Your Shoulder"	Jay-Z	5	April 10	7
March 20	"My Immortal"	Evanescence	7	April 10	5
March 20	"Toxic"	Britney Spears	9	March 27	3
April 3	"Solitaire" ↑	Clay Aiken	4	April 3	1
April 3	"I Don't Wanna Know" (#7)	Mario Winans featuring Enya and P. Diddy	2	April 24	14
April 3	"This Love" (#4)	Maroon 5	5	April 24	14
April 10	"Burn" (#2)	Usher	1	May 22	18
April 17	"Naughty Girl"	Beyoncé	3	June 5	11
April 24	"If I Ain't Got You" (#3)	Alicia Keys	4	July 3	20
April 24	"My Band"	D12	6	May 15	5
May 1	"All Falls Down"^{[B]}	Kanye West featuring Syleena Johnson	7	May 22	4
May 8	"Overnight Celebrity"	Twista	6	May 22	9
May 15	"The Reason" (#6)	Hoobastank	2	June 19	14
May 29	"Freek-a-Leek"^{[C]}	Petey Pablo	7	July 3	7
June 5	"Confessions Part II"	Usher	1	July 24	13
June 12	"Roses"	Outkast	9	June 19	2
July 3	"Slow Motion"	Juvenile featuring Soulja Slim	1	August 7	12
July 10	"I Believe" ↑	Fantasia	1	July 10	2
July 10	"Move Ya Body"	Nina Sky featuring Jabba	4	August 7	9
July 10	"On Fire"	Lloyd Banks	8	July 24	4
July 17	"Turn Me On"	Kevin Lyttle featuring Spragga Benz	4	August 14	10
July 24	"Lean Back" (#10)	Terror Squad featuring Fat Joe	1	August 21	17
July 31	"Dip It Low"	Christina Milian	5	August 21	9
August 7	"Sunshine"	Lil' Flip featuring Lea	2	August 28	11
August 14	"Goodies" (#9)	Ciara featuring Petey Pablo	1	September 11	17
August 21	"My Place"	Nelly featuring Jaheim	4	September 4	10
August 28	"Pieces of Me"	Ashlee Simpson	5	September 18	6
September 11	"She Will Be Loved"	Maroon 5	5	September 25	11
September 18	"Locked Up"	Akon featuring Styles P	8	October 9	7
September 25	"Diary"	Alicia Keys featuring Tony! Toni! Toné!	8	October 2	4
September 25	"My Boo"	Usher and Alicia Keys	1	October 30	19
October 2	"My Happy Ending"	Avril Lavigne	9	October 2	4
October 9	"Lose My Breath"	Destiny's Child	3	October 30	14
October 16	"Just Lose It"	Eminem	6	October 30	6
October 30	"Breakaway"^{[D]}	Kelly Clarkson	6	November 20	10
October 30	"Drop It Like It's Hot"	Snoop Dogg featuring Pharrell	1	December 11	17
October 30	"Over and Over"	Nelly featuring Tim McGraw	3	December 4	15
November 6	"Let's Go"	Trick Daddy featuring Lil Jon and Twista	7	November 27	7
November 20	"Wonderful"	Ja Rule featuring R. Kelly and Ashanti	5	November 27	9
November 27	"Breathe"	Fabolous	10	November 27	1

=== 2003 peaks ===
List of Billboard Hot 100 top ten singles in 2004 which peaked in 2003
Top ten entry date	Single	Artist	Peak	Peak date	Weeks in top ten
October 11	"Stand Up"	Ludacris featuring Shawnna	1	December 6	16
October 18	"Here Without You"^{[A]}	3 Doors Down	5	November 8	17
November 15	"Walked Outta Heaven"	Jagged Edge	6	December 20	10
November 22	"Hey Ya!" (#8)	Outkast	1	December 13	17
November 22	"Suga Suga"	Baby Bash featuring Frankie J	7	December 6	11
December 13	"Milkshake"	Kelis	3	December 27	9

=== 2005 peaks ===
List of Billboard Hot 100 top ten singles in 2004 which peaked in 2005
Top ten entry date	Single	Artist	Peak	Peak date	Weeks in top ten
November 27	"Let Me Love You"	Mario	1	January 1	21
December 4	"1, 2 Step"	Ciara featuring Missy Elliott	2	January 8	17
December 11	"Lovers & Friends"	Lil Jon & the East Side Boyz featuring Usher and Ludacris	3	January 22	14
December 18	"Soldier"	Destiny's Child featuring T.I. and Lil Wayne	3	February 12	11

== Artists with most top-ten songs ==
List of artists by total songs peaking in the top-ten
Artist	Numbers of songs
Usher	5
Alicia Keys	4
Ludacris	3
Twista	3
Outkast	3
Lil Jon	3
Beyoncé	2
Kanye West	2
Petey Pablo	2
Maroon 5	2
Nelly	2
Ciara	2
Destiny's Child	2

== See also ==
- 2004 in music
- List of Billboard Hot 100 number ones of 2004
- Billboard Year-End Hot 100 singles of 2004

== Notes ==
- ^{A} The single re-entered the Top 10 on the week ending February 7, 2004.
- ^{B} The single re-entered the Top 10 on the week ending May 22, 2004.
- ^{C} The single re-entered the Top 10 on the week ending June 26, 2004.
- ^{D} The single re-entered the Top 10 on the week ending December 25, 2004.
