= List of Billboard Hot 100 number-one singles of the 2000s =

The Billboard Hot 100 is a chart that ranks the best-performing songs in the United States, published by Billboard magazine. In the 2000s, each chart's "week ending" date was the Saturday of the following two weeks. The data were compiled by Nielsen SoundScan based collectively on each single's weekly physical (CD, vinyl and cassette) and digital sales, airplay, and streaming. Only songs released as physical singles were counted prior to 1998, when Billboard magazine allowed airplay-only singles to chart. While Nielsen had begun tracking digital sales since 2003 for the component chart Digital Songs, it was not until the chart dated February 12, 2005, that digital performance was officially recognized as a performance indicator on the Hot 100, in the wake of decreasing traditional physical sales. On August 4, 2007, Billboard added online streaming to its methodology.

Throughout the decade, a total of 129 singles claimed the top spot of the Hot 100. While Santana's "Smooth" featuring Rob Thomas topped the chart in the first two weeks of 2000, it was not counted as a number-one single of the 2000s decade by Billboard because it had topped the chart in October 1999, and thus was counted as a number-one single of the 1990s decade only. Overall, the decade saw the dominance of hip hop and R&B releases with dance beats and pop crossover, replacing the 1990s' trend of sentimental ballads. While the first half of the 2000s saw the continued relevance of physical sales, the second half welcomed the dominance of digital sales performance thanks to advancements of the internet, through which music was widely distributed.

== Number-one entries ==
Key
♪ – Number-one single of the year

Note: The best-performing singles on the Billboard Hot 100 of 2000 and 2001 were Faith Hill's "Breathe" and Lifehouse's "Hanging by a Moment", respectively. Both of the singles peaked at number two, and thus are not included here.

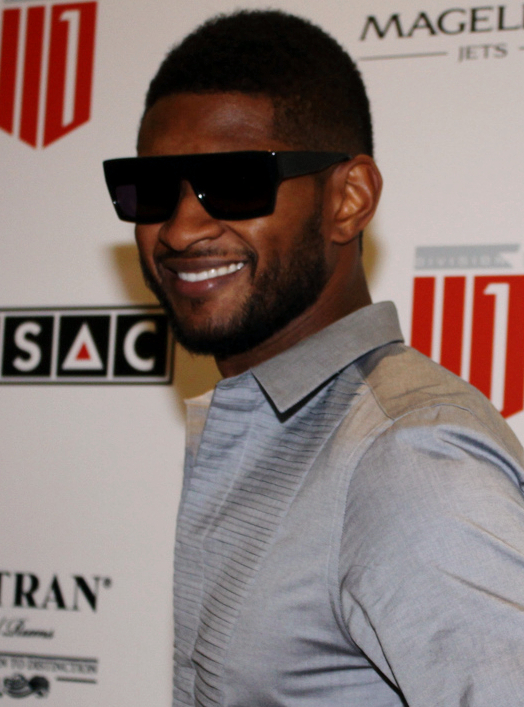
Usher accumulated the most number-one entries (seven) and the most weeks atop the chart (42 weeks) throughout the 2000s.

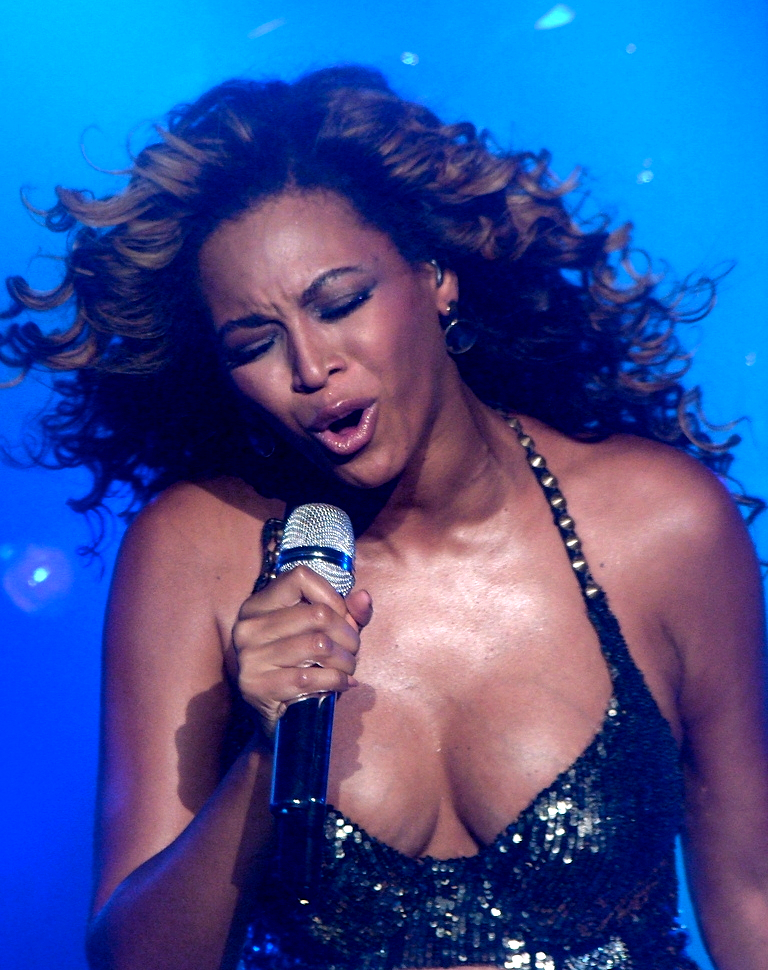
Beyoncé spent 36 weeks atop the Billboard Hot 100 with five entries, including the number-one song of 2007, "Irreplaceable".

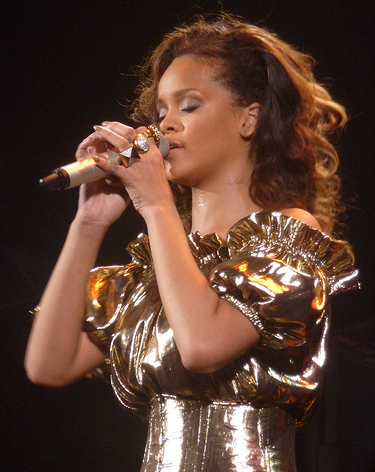
Rihanna accumulated five number-one singles, spending 19 weeks atop the chart.

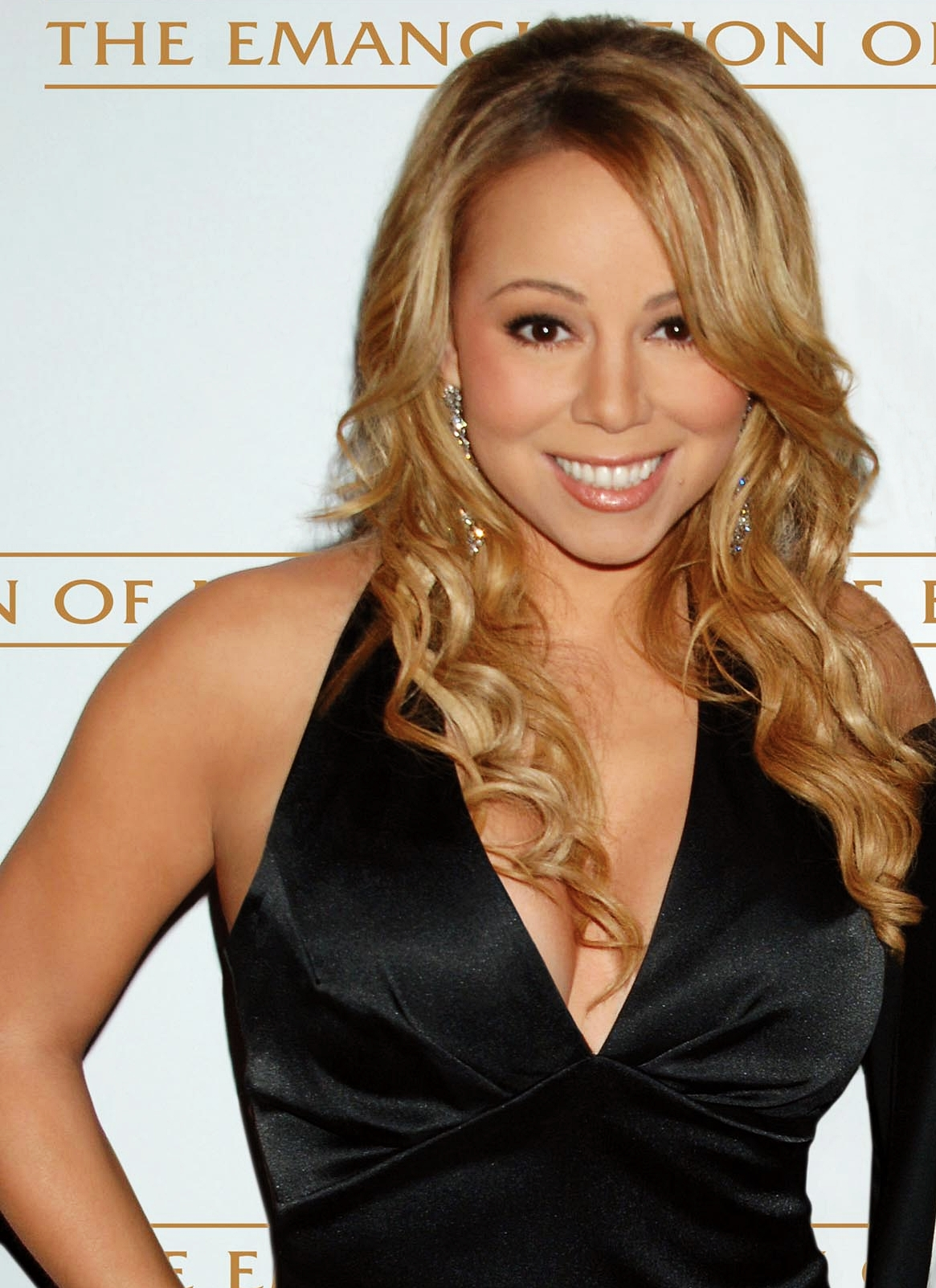
Mariah Carey earned four number-one singles, including the best-performing single of the decade "We Belong Together", which spent 14 weeks atop the Hot 100.

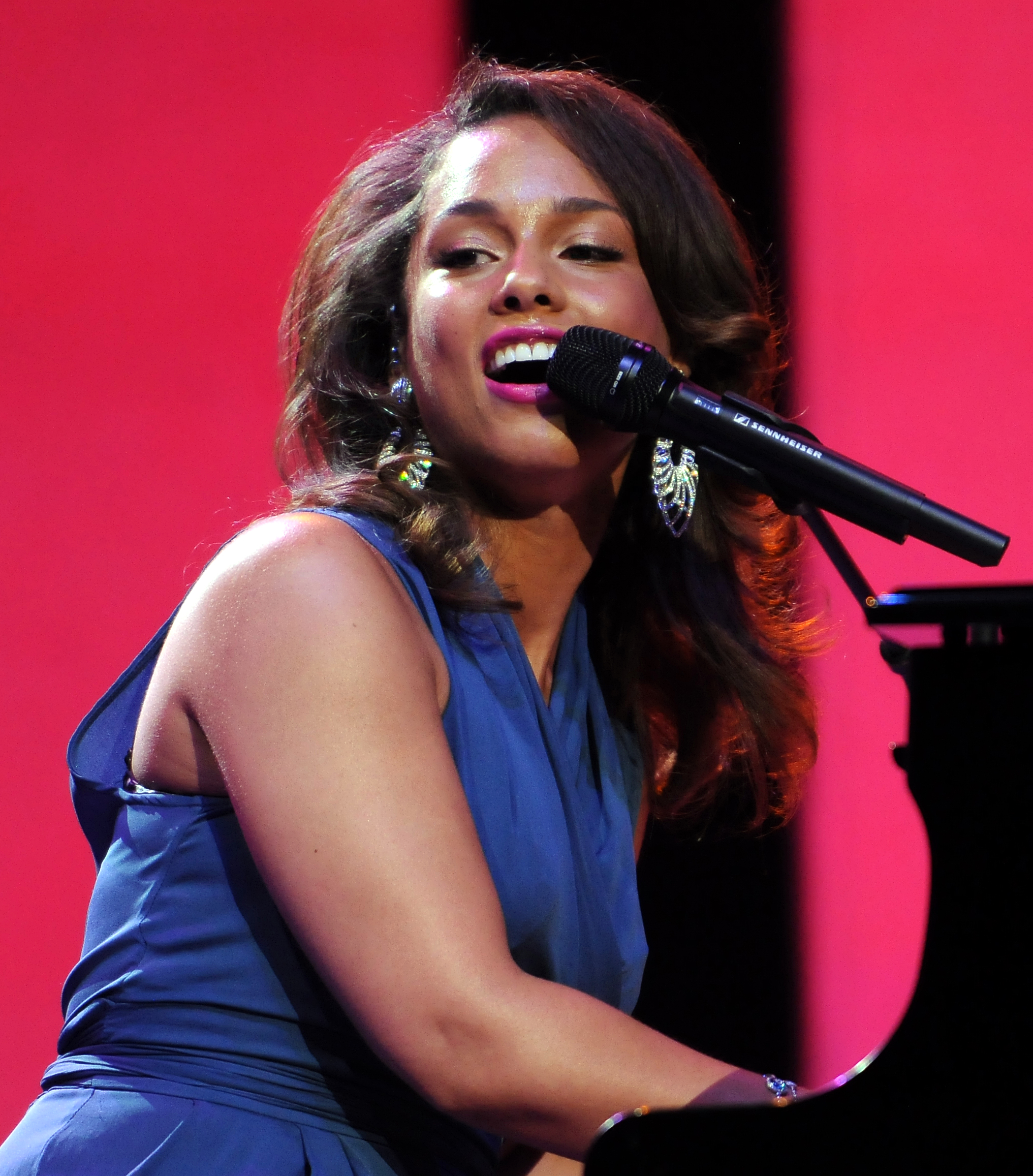
Alicia Keys scored four number-one entries, totaling 22 weeks atop the chart.

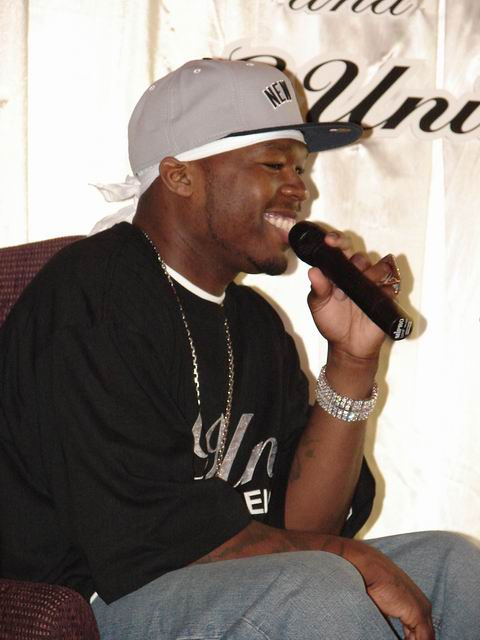
50 Cent scored four number ones, including 2003's best-performing single, "In da Club".

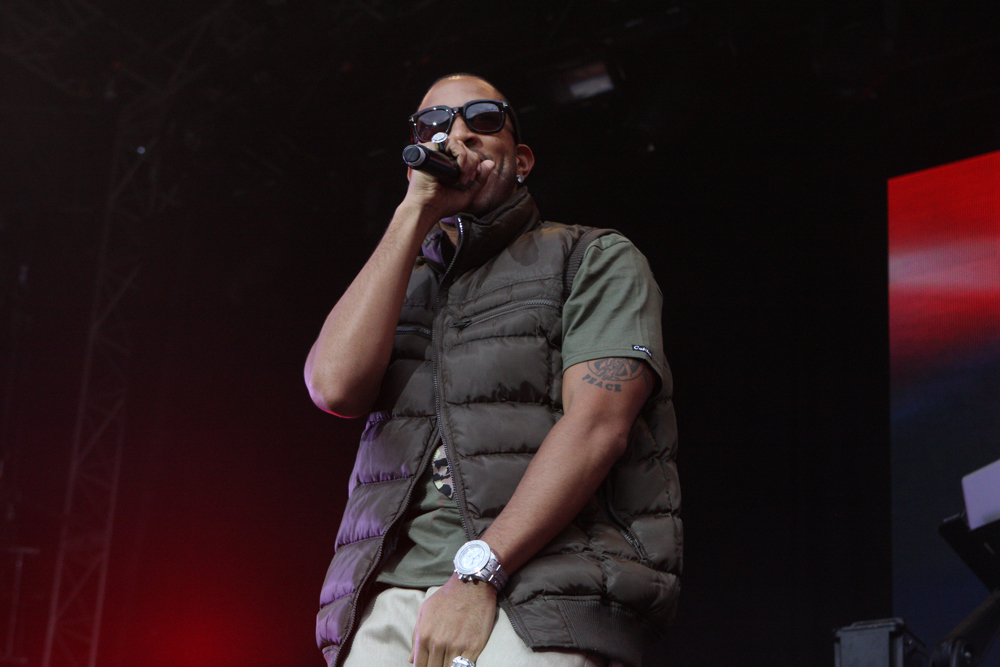
Ludacris gathered four number-one songs, including a feature on Usher's "Yeah!", which topped the Year-End chart of 2004.

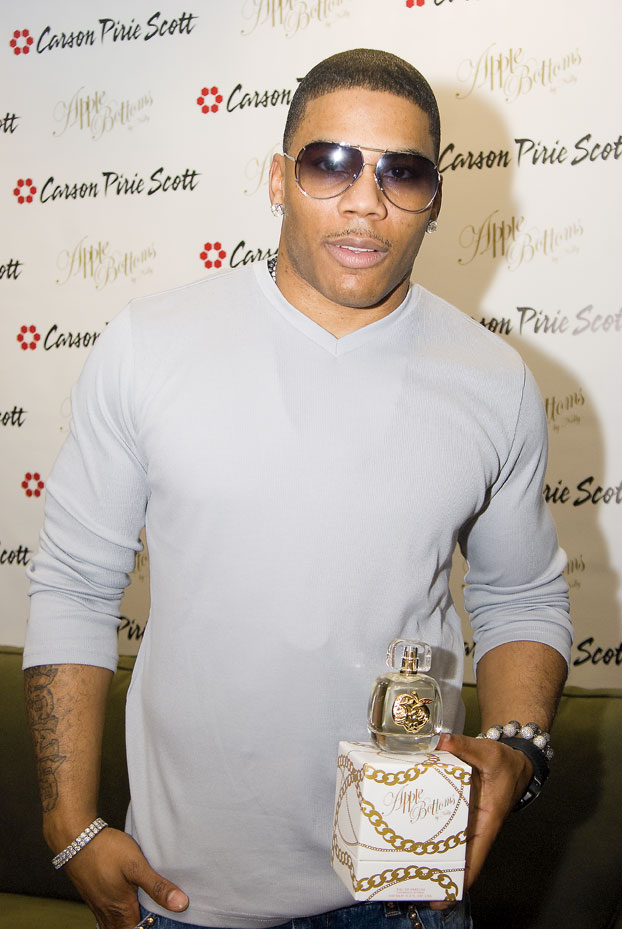
Nelly spent 23 weeks atop the chart with four entries.

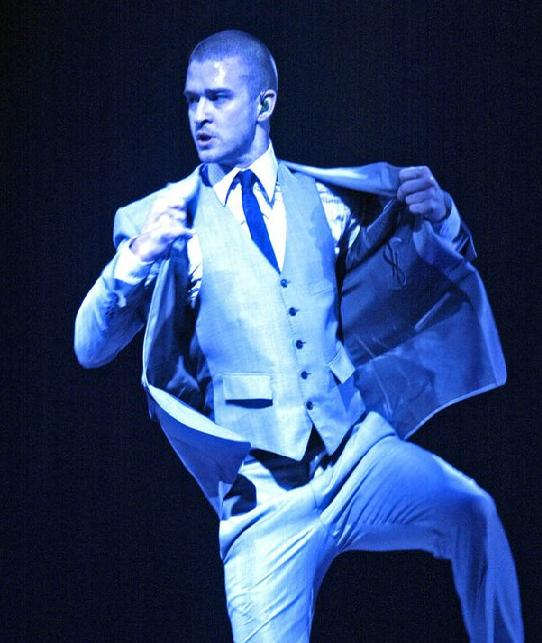
Justin Timberlake gained three number-one songs as a lead singer and one as a featured artist.

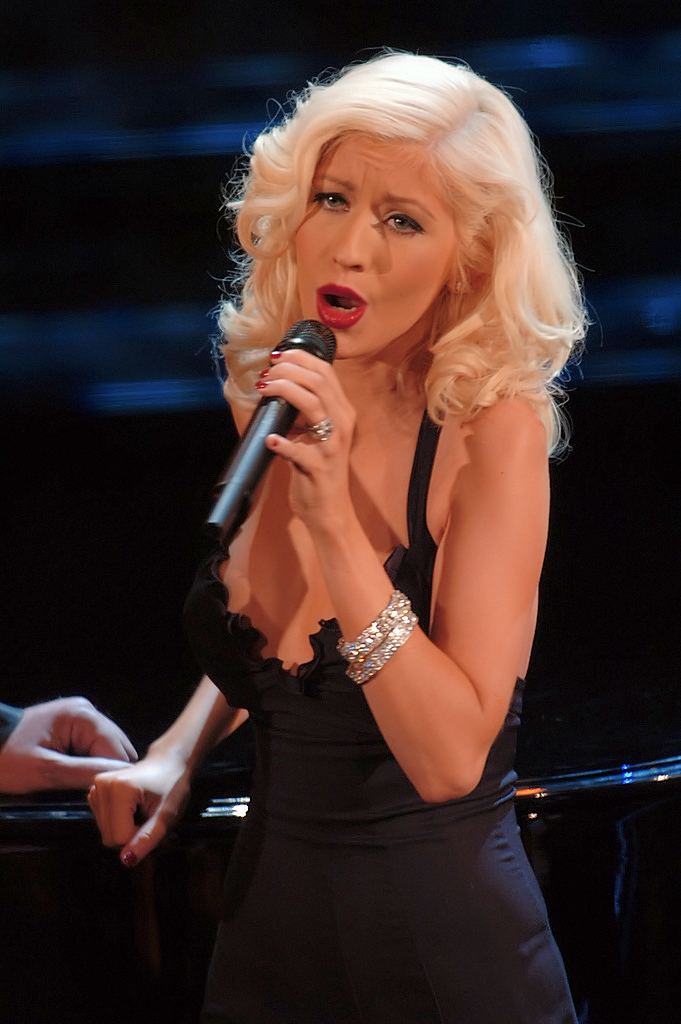
Christina Aguilera scored three number-one entries, including "What a Girl Wants", the opening number one of the decade and the 21st century overall.

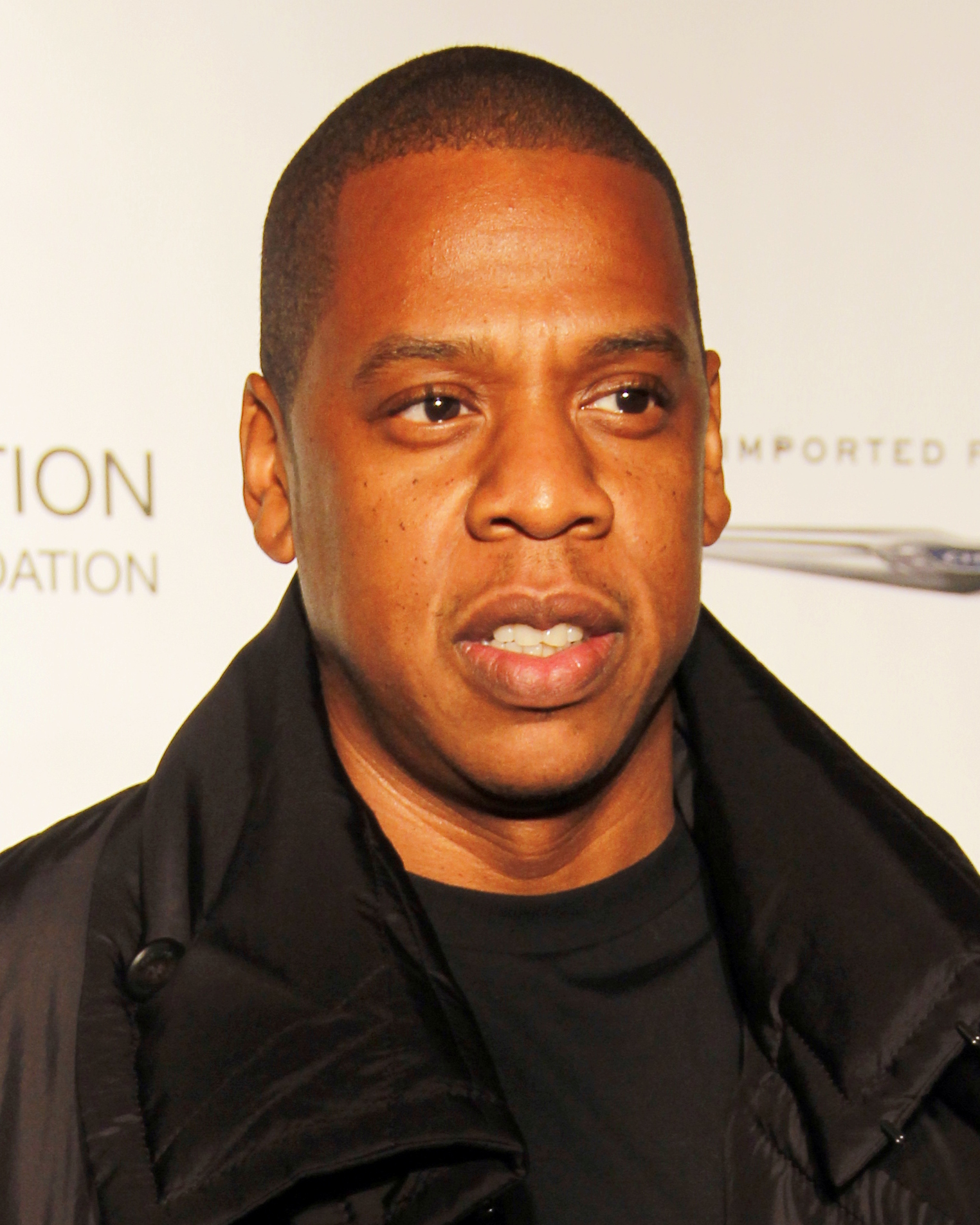
Jay-Z amassed three number-one singles, including the concluding number one of the decade "Empire State of Mind", featuring Alicia Keys.

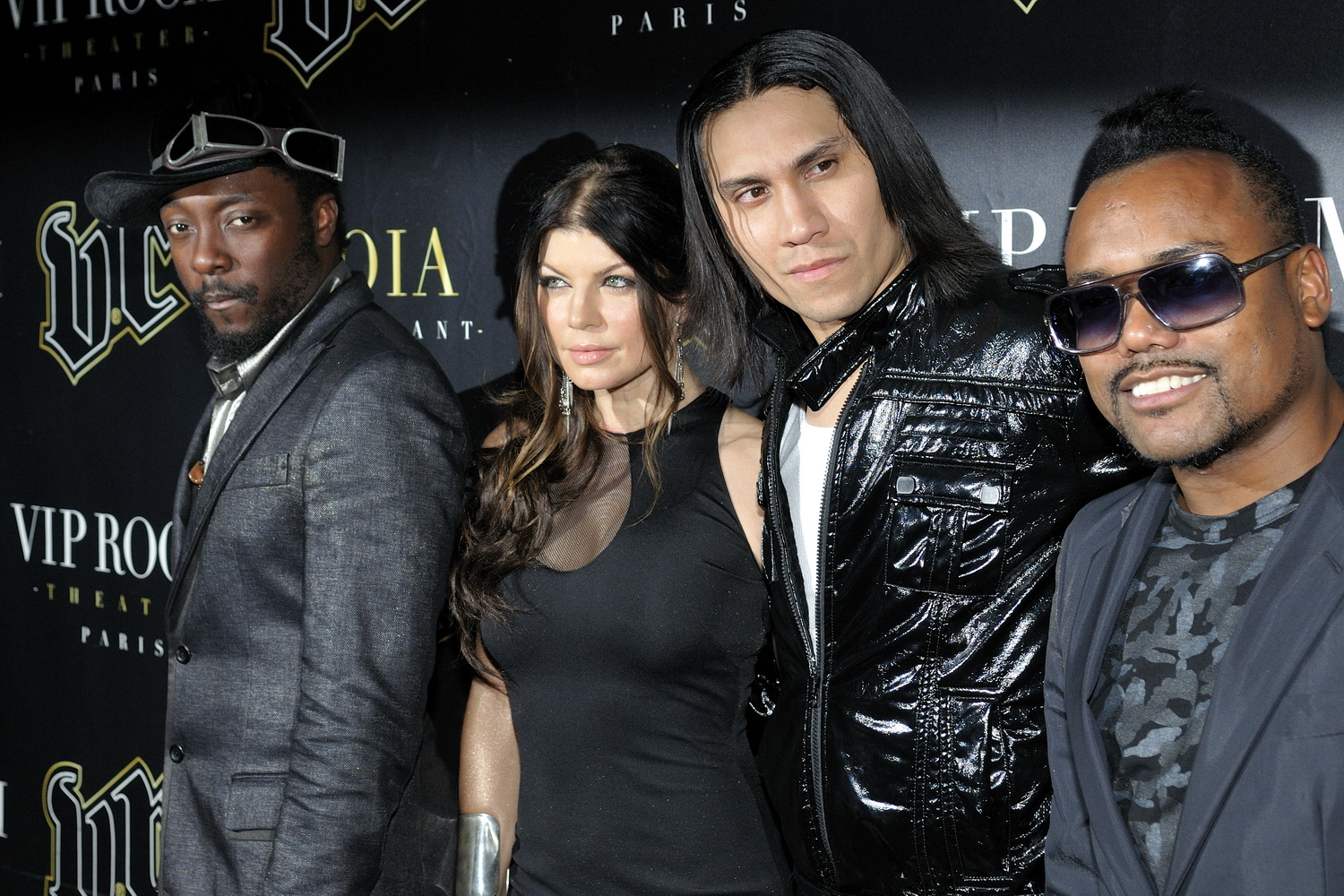
The Black Eyed Peas spent the record 26 consecutive weeks atop the Hot 100, with "Boom Boom Pow" and "I Gotta Feeling", both of which dominated the chart for over 10 weeks.

No.	Issue date	Artist(s) (Note: The artist, song name, chart date and weeks at number one are those given by Billboard magazine with data compiled by Nielsen SoundScan.)	Single	Weeks at No. 1
2000
851	January 15, 2000	Christina Aguilera	"What a Girl Wants"	2
852	January 29, 2000	Savage Garden	"I Knew I Loved You"	4
853	February 19, 2000	Mariah Carey featuring Joe and 98 Degrees	"Thank God I Found You"	1
854	March 4, 2000	Lonestar	"Amazed"	2
855	March 18, 2000	Destiny's Child	"Say My Name"	3
856	April 8, 2000	Santana featuring The Product G&B	"Maria Maria"	10
857	June 17, 2000	Aaliyah	"Try Again"	1
858	June 24, 2000	Enrique Iglesias	"Be With You"	3
859	July 15, 2000	Vertical Horizon	"Everything You Want"	1
860	July 22, 2000	Matchbox Twenty	"Bent"	1
861	July 29, 2000	NSYNC	"It's Gonna Be Me"	2
862	August 12, 2000	Sisqó	"Incomplete"	2
863	August 26, 2000	Janet	"Doesn't Really Matter"	3
864	September 16, 2000	Madonna	"Music"	4
865	October 14, 2000	Christina Aguilera	"Come On Over Baby (All I Want Is You)"	4
866	November 11, 2000	Creed	"With Arms Wide Open"	1
867	November 18, 2000	Destiny's Child	"Independent Women"	11
2001
868	February 3, 2001	Shaggy featuring Ricardo 'Rikrok' Ducent	"It Wasn't Me"	2
869	February 17, 2001	Outkast	"Ms. Jackson"	1
870	February 24, 2001	Joe featuring Mystikal	"Stutter"	4
871	March 24, 2001	Crazy Town	"Butterfly"	2
872	March 31, 2001	Shaggy featuring Rayvon	"Angel"	1
873	April 14, 2001	Janet	"All For You"	7
874	June 2, 2001	Christina Aguilera, Lil' Kim, Mýa and Pink	"Lady Marmalade"	5
875	July 7, 2001	Usher	"U Remind Me"	4
876	August 4, 2001	Destiny's Child	"Bootylicious"	2
877	August 18, 2001	Alicia Keys	"Fallin'"	6
878	September 8, 2001	Jennifer Lopez featuring Ja Rule	"I'm Real"	5
879	November 3, 2001	Mary J. Blige	"Family Affair"	6
880	December 15, 2001	Usher	"U Got It Bad"	6
881	December 22, 2001	Nickelback	"How You Remind Me"♪ (Note: Best-performing single on the Billboard Hot 100 of 2002)	4
2002
882	February 23, 2002	Ja Rule featuring Ashanti	"Always on Time"	2
883	March 9, 2002	Jennifer Lopez featuring Ja Rule	"Ain't It Funny"	6
884	April 20, 2002	Ashanti	"Foolish"	10
885	June 29, 2002	Nelly	"Hot in Herre"	7
886	August 17, 2002	Nelly featuring Kelly Rowland	"Dilemma"	10
887	October 5, 2002	Kelly Clarkson	"A Moment Like This"	2
888	November 9, 2002	Eminem	"Lose Yourself"	12
2003
889	February 1, 2003	B2K featuring P. Diddy	"Bump, Bump, Bump"	1
890	February 8, 2003	Jennifer Lopez featuring LL Cool J	"All I Have"	4
891	March 8, 2003	50 Cent	"In da Club"♪ (Note: Best-performing single on the Billboard Hot 100 of 2003)	9
892	May 10, 2003	Sean Paul	"Get Busy"	3
893	May 31, 2003	50 Cent featuring Nate Dogg	"21 Questions"	4
894	June 28, 2003	Clay Aiken	"This Is the Night"	2
895	July 12, 2003	Beyoncé featuring Jay-Z	"Crazy in Love"	8
896	September 6, 2003	Nelly, P. Diddy and Murphy Lee	"Shake Ya Tailfeather"	4
897	October 4, 2003	Beyoncé featuring Sean Paul	"Baby Boy"	9
898	December 6, 2003	Ludacris featuring Shawnna	"Stand Up"	1
899	December 13, 2003	Outkast	"Hey Ya!"	9
2004
900	February 14, 2004	Outkast featuring Sleepy Brown	"The Way You Move"	1
901	February 21, 2004	Twista featuring Kanye West and Jamie Foxx	"Slow Jamz"	1
902	February 28, 2004	Usher featuring Lil Jon and Ludacris	"Yeah!"♪ (Note: Best-performing single on the Billboard Hot 100 of 2004)	12
903	May 22, 2004	Usher	"Burn"	8
904	July 10, 2004	Fantasia	"I Believe"	1
905	July 24, 2004	Usher	"Confessions Part II"	2
906	August 7, 2004	Juvenile featuring Soulja Slim	"Slow Motion"	2
907	August 21, 2004	Terror Squad	"Lean Back"	3
908	September 11, 2004	Ciara featuring Petey Pablo	"Goodies"	7
909	October 30, 2004	Usher and Alicia Keys	"My Boo"	6
910	December 11, 2004	Snoop Dogg featuring Pharrell	"Drop It Like It's Hot"	3
2005
911	January 1, 2005	Mario	"Let Me Love You"	9
912	March 5, 2005	50 Cent featuring Olivia	"Candy Shop"	9
913	May 7, 2005	Gwen Stefani	"Hollaback Girl"	4
914	June 4, 2005	Mariah Carey	"We Belong Together"♪ (Note: "We Belong Together" was also the best-performing Billboard Hot 100 single of the decade overall.)	14
915	July 2, 2005	Carrie Underwood	"Inside Your Heaven"	1
916	September 17, 2005	Kanye West featuring Jamie Foxx	"Gold Digger"	10
917	November 26, 2005	Chris Brown	"Run It!"	5
918	December 31, 2005	Mariah Carey	"Don't Forget About Us"	2
2006
919	January 14, 2006	D4L	"Laffy Taffy"	1
920	January 21, 2006	Nelly featuring Paul Wall, Ali & Gipp	"Grillz"	2
921	February 4, 2006	Beyoncé featuring Slim Thug	"Check on It"	5
922	March 11, 2006	James Blunt	"You're Beautiful"	1
923	March 18, 2006	Ne-Yo	"So Sick"	2
924	April 1, 2006	Sean Paul	"Temperature"	1
925	April 8, 2006	Daniel Powter	"Bad Day"♪ (Note: Best-performing single on the Billboard Hot 100 of 2006)	5
926	May 13, 2006	Rihanna	"SOS"	3
927	June 3, 2006	Chamillionaire featuring Krayzie Bone	"Ridin'"	2
928	June 17, 2006	Shakira featuring Wyclef Jean	"Hips Don't Lie"	2
929	July 1, 2006	Taylor Hicks	"Do I Make You Proud"	1
930	July 8, 2006	Nelly Furtado featuring Timbaland	"Promiscuous"	6
931	August 19, 2006	Fergie	"London Bridge"	3
932	September 9, 2006	Justin Timberlake	"SexyBack"	7
933	October 28, 2006	Ludacris featuring Pharrell	"Money Maker"	2
934	November 11, 2006	Justin Timberlake featuring T.I.	"My Love"	3
935	December 2, 2006	Akon featuring Snoop Dogg	"I Wanna Love You"	2
936	December 16, 2006	Beyoncé	"Irreplaceable"♪ (Note: Best-performing single on the Billboard Hot 100 of 2007)	10
2007
937	February 24, 2007	Nelly Furtado	"Say It Right"	1
938	March 3, 2007	Justin Timberlake	"What Goes Around... Comes Around"	1
939	March 10, 2007	Mims	"This Is Why I'm Hot"	2
940	March 24, 2007	Fergie featuring Ludacris	"Glamorous"	2
941	April 7, 2007	Akon	"Don't Matter"	2
942	April 21, 2007	Timbaland featuring Nelly Furtado and Justin Timberlake	"Give It To Me"	2
943	May 5, 2007	Avril Lavigne	"Girlfriend"	1
944	May 12, 2007	Maroon 5	"Makes Me Wonder"	3
945	May 26, 2007	T-Pain featuring Yung Joc	"Buy U a Drank (Shawty Snappin')"	1
946	June 9, 2007	Rihanna featuring Jay-Z	"Umbrella"	7
947	July 28, 2007	Plain White T's	"Hey There Delilah"	2
948	August 11, 2007	Sean Kingston	"Beautiful Girls"	4
949	September 8, 2007	Fergie	"Big Girls Don't Cry"	1
950	September 15, 2007	Soulja Boy	"Crank That (Soulja Boy)"	7
951	September 29, 2007	Kanye West	"Stronger"	1
952	November 10, 2007	Chris Brown featuring T-Pain	"Kiss Kiss"	3
953	December 1, 2007	Alicia Keys	"No One"	5
2008
954	January 5, 2008	Flo Rida featuring T-Pain	"Low"♪ (Note: Best-performing single on the Billboard Hot 100 of 2008)	10
955	March 15, 2008	Usher featuring Young Jeezy	"Love in This Club"	3
956	April 5, 2008	Leona Lewis	"Bleeding Love"	4
957	April 12, 2008	Mariah Carey	"Touch My Body"	2
958	May 3, 2008	Lil Wayne featuring Static Major	"Lollipop"	5
959	May 24, 2008	Rihanna	"Take a Bow"	1
960	June 28, 2008	Coldplay	"Viva la Vida"	1
961	July 5, 2008	Katy Perry	"I Kissed a Girl"	7
962	August 23, 2008	Rihanna	"Disturbia"	2
963	September 6, 2008	T.I.	"Whatever You Like"	7
964	September 27, 2008	Pink	"So What"	1
965	October 18, 2008	T.I. featuring Rihanna	"Live Your Life"	6
966	October 25, 2008	Britney Spears	"Womanizer"	1
967	December 13, 2008	Beyoncé	"Single Ladies (Put a Ring on It)"	4
2009
968	January 17, 2009	Lady Gaga featuring Colby O'Donis	"Just Dance"	3
969	February 7, 2009	Kelly Clarkson	"My Life Would Suck Without You"	2
970	February 21, 2009	Eminem featuring Dr. Dre and 50 Cent	"Crack a Bottle"	1
971	February 28, 2009	Flo Rida	"Right Round"	6
972	April 11, 2009	Lady Gaga	"Poker Face"	1
973	April 18, 2009	The Black Eyed Peas	"Boom Boom Pow"♪ (Note: Best-performing single on the Billboard Hot 100 of 2009)	12
974	July 11, 2009	The Black Eyed Peas	"I Gotta Feeling"	14
975	October 17, 2009	Jay Sean featuring Lil Wayne	"Down"	2
976	October 24, 2009	Britney Spears	"3"	1
977	November 7, 2009	Owl City	"Fireflies"	2
978	November 14, 2009	Jason Derulo	"Whatcha Say"	1
979	November 28, 2009	Jay-Z featuring Alicia Keys	"Empire State of Mind"	5

== Statistics ==
=== Artists by total number of weeks at number one ===
The following artists spent the most weeks at number one on the chart during the 2000s. A number of artists claimed number-one positions as either the lead artist or a featured artist. Rihanna's "Umbrella" featuring Jay-Z, for example, was counted for both artists because they are both credited on the single. This also applies to the subsequent statistics.

Artist	Weeks at No. 1
Usher	41
Beyoncé	36
The Black Eyed Peas	26
Nelly	23
50 Cent	23
Alicia Keys	22
Jay-Z	20
Mariah Carey	19
Rihanna	19

=== Artists by total number of number-one entries ===
While some artists appeared at number one as a solo artist and a member of a group, they were only counted as a solo artist. Justin Timberlake, for example, claimed the top spot with four singles credited as a solo singer and one single as part of 'N Sync, but was only counted separately from 'N Sync.

Artist	No. of entries	Titles
Usher	7	"U Remind Me"; "U Got It Bad"; "Yeah!"; "Burn"; "Confessions Part II"; "My Boo"; "Love in This Club"
Beyoncé	5	"Crazy in Love"; "Baby Boy"; "Check on It"; "Irreplaceable"; "Single Ladies (Put a Ring on It)"
Rihanna	5	"SOS"; "Umbrella"; "Take a Bow"; "Disturbia"; "Live Your Life"
50 Cent	4	"In da Club"; "21 Questions"; "Candy Shop"; "Crack a Bottle"
Mariah Carey	4	"Thank God I Found You"; "We Belong Together"; "Don't Forget About Us"; "Touch My Body"
Alicia Keys	4	"Fallin'"; "My Boo"; "No One"; "Empire State of Mind"
Ludacris	4	"Stand Up"; "Yeah!"; "Money Maker"; "Glamorous"
Nelly	4	"Hot in Herre"; "Dilemma"; "Shake Ya Tailfeather"; "Grillz"
Justin Timberlake	4	"SexyBack"; "My Love"; "What Goes Around... Comes Around"; "Give It To Me"
Christina Aguilera	3	"What A Girl Wants"; "Come On Over (All I Want Is You)"; "Lady Marmalade"
Destiny's Child	3	"Say My Name"; "Independent Women"; "Bootylicious"
Fergie	3	"London Bridge"; "Glamorous"; "Big Girls Don't Cry"
Nelly Furtado	3	"Promiscuous"; "Say It Right"; "Give It to Me"
Jay-Z	3	"Crazy in Love"; "Umbrella"; "Empire State of Mind"
Jennifer Lopez	3	"Ain't It Funny (Murder Remix)"; "I'm Real"; "All I Have"
Outkast	3	"Ms. Jackson"; "Hey Ya!"; "The Way You Move"
Sean Paul	3	"Get Busy"; "Baby Boy"; "Temperature"
Ja Rule	3	"I'm Real"; "Always on Time"; "Ain't It Funny (Murder Remix)"
T-Pain	3	"Buy U a Drank (Shawty Snappin')"; "Kiss Kiss"; "Low"
T.I.	3	"My Love"; "Whatever You Like"; "Live Your Life"
Kanye West	3	"Slow Jamz"; "Gold Digger"; "Stronger"

- Note: For singer Beyoncé, if Destiny's Child is included, she would have eight number-one singles, surpassing Usher for the most number-one singles for the decade.
- Note: For singer Fergie, if The Black Eyed Peas is included, she would have five number-one singles
- Note: For singer Justin Timberlake, if N'Sync is included, he would have five number-one singles.

=== Songs by total number of weeks at number-one ===
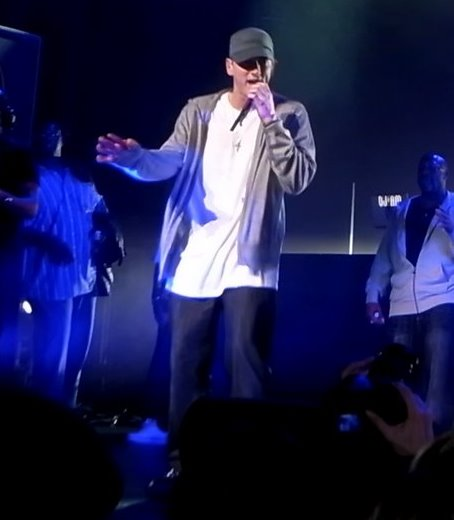
Eminem's "Lose Yourself" topped the Hot 100 for 12 weeks in 2002.

Weeks at number one	Song	Artist(s)
14	"We Belong Together"	Mariah Carey
14	"I Gotta Feeling"	The Black Eyed Peas
12	"Lose Yourself"	Eminem
12	"Yeah!"	Usher featuring Lil Jon & Ludacris
12	"Boom Boom Pow"	The Black Eyed Peas
11	"Independent Women"	Destiny's Child
10	"Maria Maria"	Santana featuring The Product G&B
10	"Foolish"	Ashanti
10	"Dilemma"	Nelly featuring Kelly Rowland
10	"Gold Digger"	Kanye West featuring Jamie Foxx
10	"Irreplaceable"	Beyoncé
10	"Low"	Flo Rida & T-Pain
