= Billboard Year-End Hot R&B/Hip-Hop Singles & Tracks of 2004 =

American music chart

This is a list of Billboard magazine's Top Hot R&B/Hip-Hop Singles & Tracks of 2004.

No.	Title	Artist(s)
1	"If I Ain't Got You"	Alicia Keys
2	"Yeah!"	Usher featuring Ludacris and Lil Jon
3	"Burn"	Usher
4	"Diary"	Alicia Keys featuring Tony! Toni! Toné!
5	"Lean Back"	Terror Squad
6	"You Don't Know My Name"	Alicia Keys
7	"Jesus Walks"	Kanye West
8	"Me, Myself and I"	Beyoncé
9	"Slow Jamz"	Twista featuring Kanye West and Jamie Foxx
10	"Confessions Part II"	Usher
11	"Slow Motion"	Juvenile featuring Soulja Slim
12	"Goodies"	Ciara featuring Petey Pablo
13	"The Way You Move"	Outkast featuring Sleepy Brown
14	"Dirt off Your Shoulder"	Jay-Z
15	"Sorry 2004"	Ruben Studdard
16	"Freek-a-Leek"	Petey Pablo
17	"Tipsy"	J-Kwon
18	"Splash Waterfalls"	Ludacris
19	"Overnight Celebrity"	Twista
20	"I Don't Wanna Know"	Mario Winans featuring Enya and P. Diddy
21	"Read Your Mind"	Avant
22	"Step in the Name of Love"	R. Kelly
23	"All Falls Down"	Kanye West featuring Syleena Johnson
24	"Walked Outta Heaven"	Jagged Edge
25	"Why?"	Jadakiss featuring Anthony Hamilton
26	"Hotel"	Cassidy featuring R. Kelly
27	"Salt Shaker"	Ying Yang Twins featuring Lil Jon & the East Side Boyz
28	"My Boo"	Usher and Alicia Keys
29	"U Should've Known Better"	Monica
30	"My Place"	Nelly featuring Jaheim
31	"One Call Away"	Chingy featuring J-Weav
32	"Locked Up"	Akon featuring Styles P
33	"Happy People"	R. Kelly
34	"On Fire"	Lloyd Banks
35	"Game Over (Flip)"	Lil' Flip
36	"Sunshine"	Lil' Flip featuring Lea
37	"Through the Wire"	Kanye West
38	"Damn!"	YoungBloodZ featuring Lil Jon
39	"Headsprung"	LL Cool J
40	"Milkshake"	Kelis
41	"So Sexy"	Twista featuring R. Kelly
42	"Think About You"	Luther Vandross
43	"Drop It Like It's Hot"	Snoop Dogg featuring Pharrell
44	"Charlene"	Anthony Hamilton
45	"Rubber Band Man"	T.I.
46	"Naughty Girl"	Beyoncé
47	"No Problem"	Lil Scrappy
48	"I'm Still in Love with You"	Sean Paul featuring Sasha
49	"Hey Ya!"	Outkast
50	"Dude"	Beenie Man featuring Ms. Thing
51	"Wanna Get to Know You"	G-Unit featuring Joe
52	"Don't Take Your Love Away"	Avant
53	"Stand Up"	Ludacris featuring Shawnna
54	"Change Clothes"	Jay-Z
55	"Nolia Clap"	UTP (As Juvenile, Wacko and Skip)
56	"Still in Love"	Teena Marie featuring Baby
57	"Move Ya Body"	Nina Sky
58	"More & More"	Joe
59	"Go D.J."	Lil Wayne
60	"No Better Love"	Young Gunz featuring Rell
61	"U Saved Me"	R. Kelly
62	"Roses"	Outkast
63	"Southside"	Lloyd featuring Ashanti
64	"Call My Name"	Prince
65	"Runnin' (Dying to Live)"	2Pac featuring The Notorious B.I.G.
66	"Stunt 101"	G-Unit
67	"Get Low"	Lil Jon & the East Side Boyz featuring Ying Yang Twins
68	"Dip It Low"	Christina Milian
69	"I Can't Wait"	Sleepy Brown featuring Outkast
70	"Let's Get Away"	T.I.
71	"In My Life"	Juvenile featuring Mannie Fresh
72	"Breathe"	Fabolous
73	"Let Me In"	Young Buck
74	"Breathe, Stretch, Shake"	Mase featuring P. Diddy
75	"Whoknows"	Musiq
76	"Dangerously in Love"	Beyoncé
77	"I Like That"	Houston featuring Chingy, Nate Dogg and I-20
78	"Got It Twisted"	Mobb Deep
79	"Holidae In"	Chingy featuring Ludacris and Snoop Dogg
80	"Lose My Breath"	Destiny's Child
81	"Wonderful"	Ja Rule featuring R. Kelly and Ashanti
82	"Selfish"	Slum Village featuring Kanye West and John Legend
83	"Talk About Our Love"	Brandy featuring Kanye West
84	"You're My Everything"	Anita Baker
85	"Turn Me On"	Kevin Lyttle featuring Spragga Benz
86	"Jook Gal"	Elephant Man
87	"Wat Da Hook Gon Be"	Murphy Lee featuring Jermaine Dupri
88	"Hush"	LL Cool J featuring 7 Aurelius
89	"Neva Eva"	Trillville
90	"I Want You"	Janet Jackson
91	"Gangsta Nation"	Westside Connection featuring Nate Dogg
92	"Gigolo"	Nick Cannon featuring R. Kelly
93	"Welcome Back"	Mase
94	"Knuck If You Buck"	Crime Mob featuring Lil Scrappy
95	"Flap Your Wings"	Nelly
96	"Forthenight"	Musiq
97	"What's Happenin!"	Ying Yang Twins featuring Trick Daddy
98	"You Don't Want Drama"	8Ball & MJG featuring P. Diddy
99	"Shorty Wanna Ride"	Young Buck
100	"My Baby"	Bow Wow featuring Jagged Edge

== See also ==
- 2004 in music
- Billboard Year-End Hot 100 singles of 2004
- Billboard Year-End Hot Rap Singles of 2004
- List of Hot R&B/Hip-Hop Singles & Tracks number ones of 2004
