= Billboard Year-End Hot 100 singles of 2004 =

Ranking of recorded music

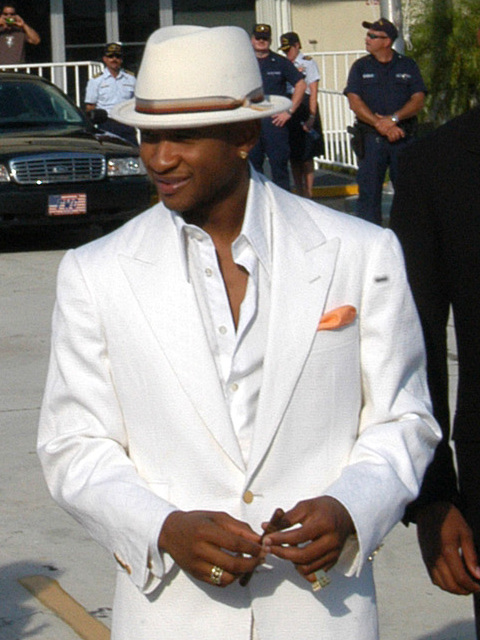
This year Usher took the top two spots with "Yeah!" and "Burn", plus the 12th and the 24th with "Confessions Part II" and "My Boo", respectively. All four singles were from his Confessions album.

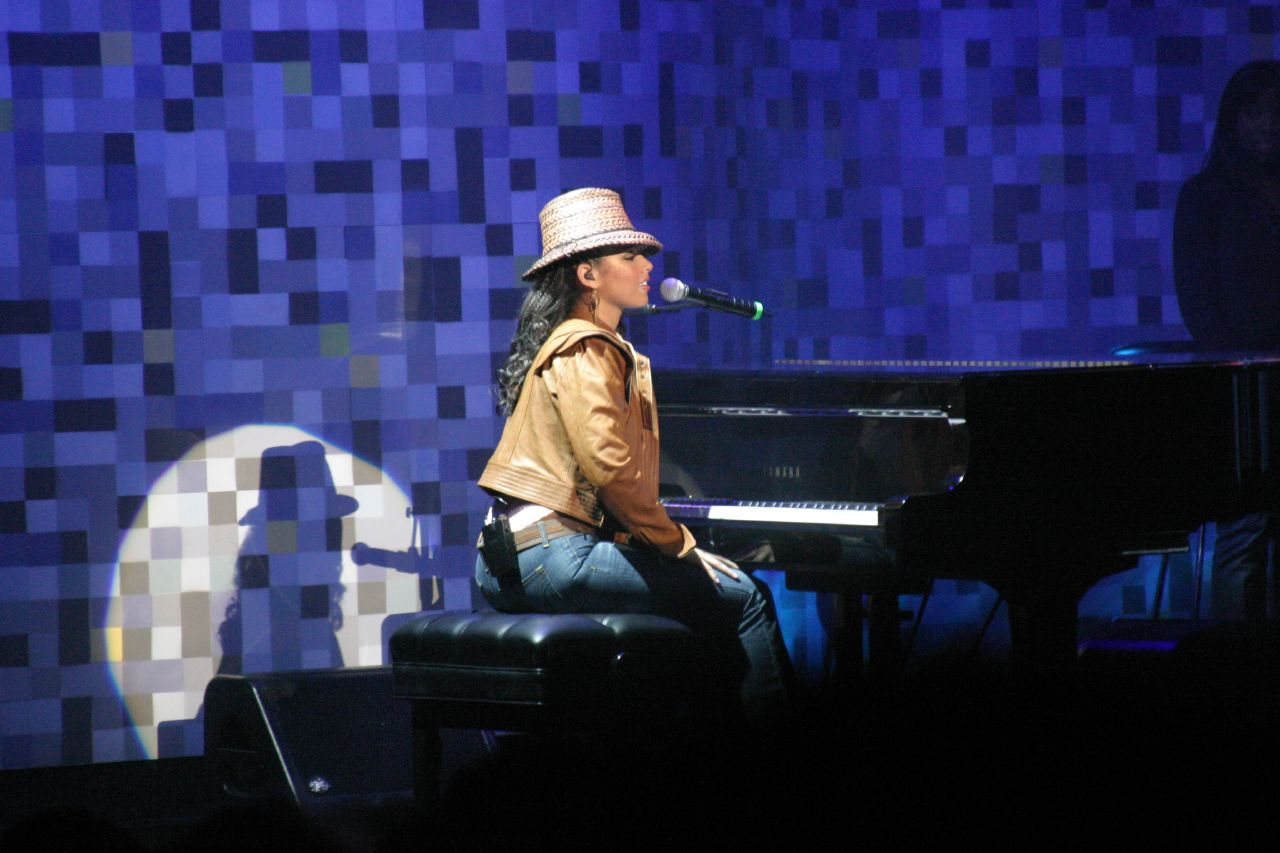
Alicia Keys had four songs, including "If I Ain't Got You", the number-three song of the year, on the year-end chart. "My Boo", her duet with Usher, "You Don't Know My Name", and "Diary" also all appeared within the top-40.

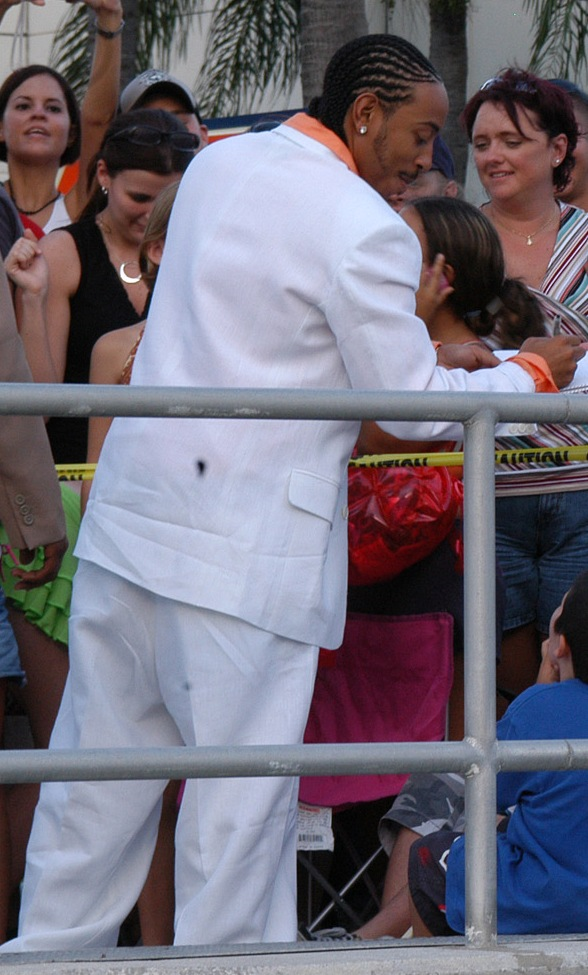
Ludacris was featured on the number-one song of the year, Usher's "Yeah!", and Chingy's song "Holidae In", which appeared at number 87. His songs "Splash Waterfalls" and "Stand Up" also appeared at numbers 42 and 45, respectively.

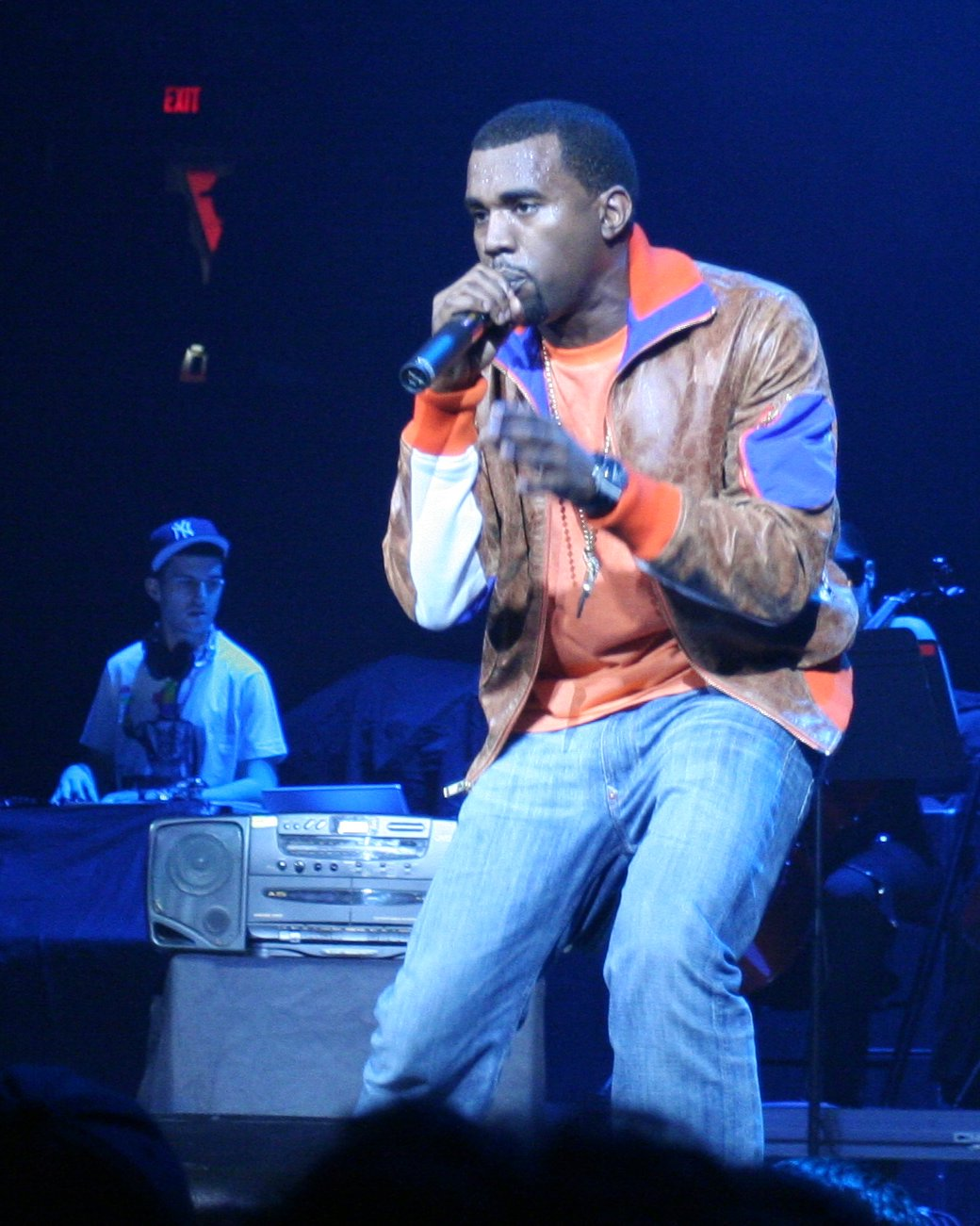
Kanye West was featured on Twista's number 16 song "Slow Jamz", while his songs "Jesus Walks" (number 43), "All Falls Down" (number 47) and "Through the Wire" (number 61) also all charted.

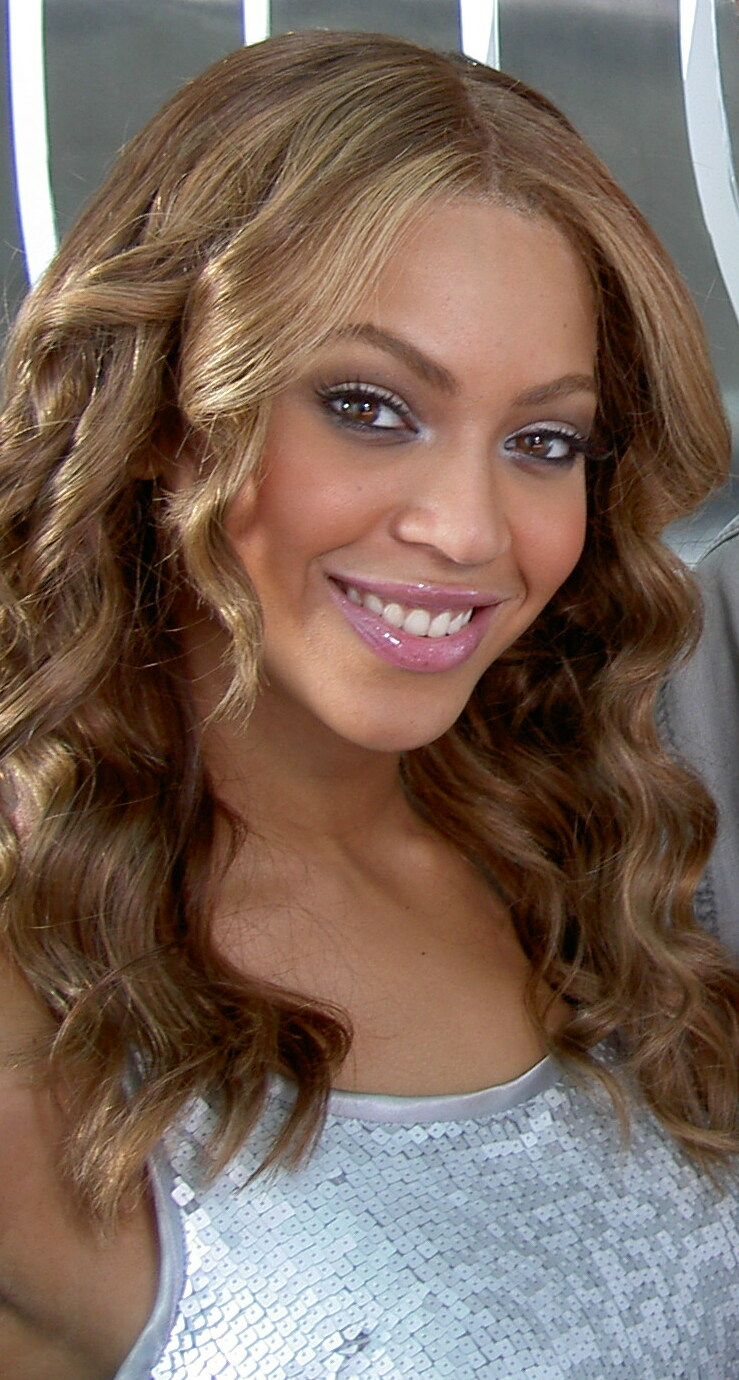
Beyoncé had three songs on 2004's Year-End Hot 100: "Naughty Girl" (number 18), "Me, Myself and I" (number 26), and "Baby Boy" (number 69). Her group Destiny's Child also charted at number 58 with the song "Lose My Breath".

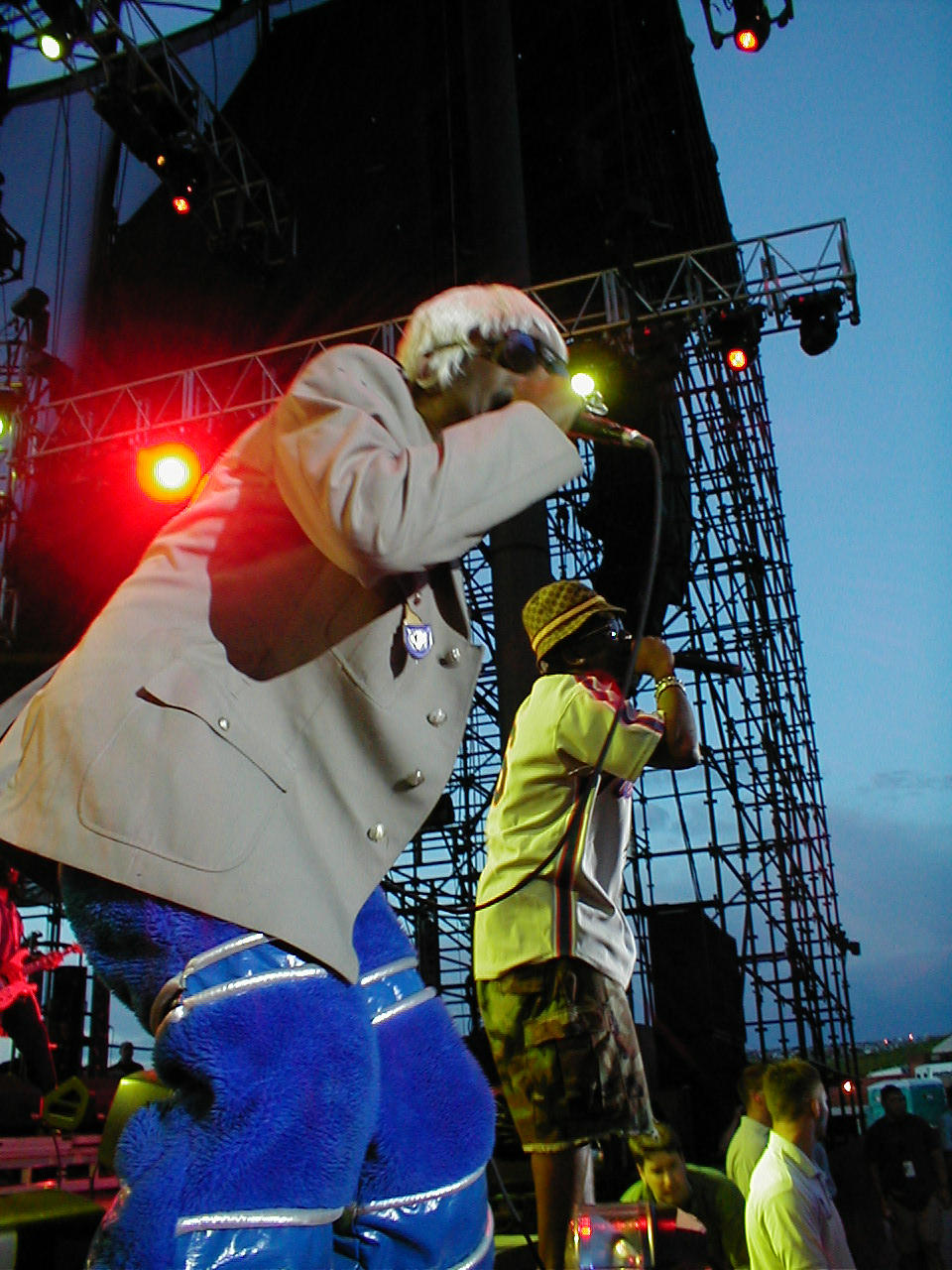
Hip-hop duo OutKast (pictured in 2001) had two songs in the top-10 of the 2004 year-end chart—"The Way You Move" at number five and "Hey Ya!" at number eight—as well as the song "Roses" at number 56.

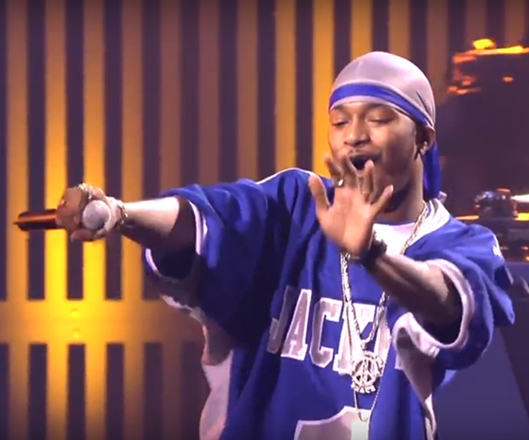
Chingy charted with two songs as a lead artist on the year-end chart of 2004, including "One Call Away" at number 25 and "Holidae In" at number 87, and was featured on the number 52 song of the year, "I Like That" by Houston.

This is a list of Billboard magazine's Top Hot 100 songs of 2004.

No.	Title	Artist(s)
1	"Yeah!"	Usher featuring Lil Jon and Ludacris
2	"Burn"	Usher
3	"If I Ain't Got You"	Alicia Keys
4	"This Love"	Maroon 5
5	"The Way You Move"	OutKast featuring Sleepy Brown
6	"The Reason"	Hoobastank
7	"I Don't Wanna Know"	Mario Winans featuring Enya and P. Diddy
8	"Hey Ya!"	OutKast
9	"Goodies"	Ciara featuring Petey Pablo
10	"Lean Back"	Terror Squad featuring Fat Joe and Remy Ma
11	"Tipsy"	J-Kwon
12	"Confessions Part II"	Usher
13	"Slow Motion"	Juvenile featuring Soulja Slim
14	"Freek-a-Leek"	Petey Pablo
15	"Here Without You"	3 Doors Down
16	"Slow Jamz"	Twista featuring Kanye West and Jamie Foxx
17	"Someday"	Nickelback
18	"Naughty Girl"	Beyoncé
19	"My Immortal"	Evanescence
20	"Sunshine"	Lil' Flip featuring Lea
21	"Dirt off Your Shoulder"	Jay-Z
22	"Move Ya Body"	Nina Sky featuring Jabba
23	"Dip It Low"	Christina Milian
24	"My Boo"	Usher and Alicia Keys
25	"One Call Away"	Chingy featuring J-Weav
26	"Me, Myself and I"	Beyoncé
27	"Turn Me On"	Kevin Lyttle featuring Spragga Benz
28	"The First Cut Is the Deepest"	Sheryl Crow
29	"You Don't Know My Name"	Alicia Keys
30	"My Place"	Nelly featuring Jaheim
31	"Overnight Celebrity"	Twista
32	"Hotel"	Cassidy featuring R. Kelly
33	"Numb"	Linkin Park
34	"Diary"	Alicia Keys featuring Tony! Toni! Toné!
35	"She Will Be Loved"	Maroon 5
36	"White Flag"	Dido
37	"Heaven"	Los Lonely Boys
38	"It's My Life"	No Doubt
39	"Pieces of Me"	Ashlee Simpson
40	"Leave (Get Out)"	JoJo
41	"Milkshake"	Kelis
42	"Splash Waterfalls"	Ludacris
43	"Jesus Walks"	Kanye West
44	"Locked Up"	Akon featuring Styles P
45	"Stand Up"	Ludacris featuring Shawnna
46	"Suga Suga"	Baby Bash featuring Frankie J
47	"All Falls Down"	Kanye West featuring Syleena Johnson
48	"Toxic"	Britney Spears
49	"Salt Shaker"	Ying Yang Twins featuring Lil Jon & the East Side Boyz
50	"With You"	Jessica Simpson
51	"Meant to Live"	Switchfoot
52	"I Like That"	Houston featuring Chingy, Nate Dogg and I-20
53	"Sorry 2004"	Ruben Studdard
54	"My Happy Ending"	Avril Lavigne
55	"On Fire"	Lloyd Banks
56	"Roses"	OutKast
57	"Walked Outta Heaven"	Jagged Edge
58	"Lose My Breath"	Destiny's Child
59	"My Band"	D12
60	"I'm Still in Love with You"	Sean Paul featuring Sasha
61	"Through the Wire"	Kanye West
62	"Why?"	Jadakiss featuring Anthony Hamilton
63	"Fuck It (I Don't Want You Back)"	Eamon
64	"Read Your Mind"	Avant
65	"Game Over (Flip)"	Lil' Flip
66	"One Thing"	Finger Eleven
67	"Headsprung"	LL Cool J
68	"Damn!"	YoungBloodZ featuring Lil Jon
69	"Baby Boy"	Beyoncé featuring Sean Paul
70	"Get Low"	Lil Jon & the East Side Boyz featuring Ying Yang Twins
71	"Drop It Like It's Hot"	Snoop Dogg featuring Pharrell
72	"U Should've Known Better"	Monica
73	"On the Way Down"	Ryan Cabrera
74	"Breakaway"	Kelly Clarkson
75	"Why Don't You & I"	Santana featuring Alex Band
76	"Are You Gonna Be My Girl"	Jet
77	"100 Years"	Five for Fighting
78	"Step in the Name of Love"	R. Kelly
79	"Breaking the Habit"	Linkin Park
80	"Gigolo"	Nick Cannon featuring R. Kelly
81	"Live Like You Were Dying"	Tim McGraw
82	"Remember When"	Alan Jackson
83	"Everytime"	Britney Spears
84	"Southside"	Lloyd featuring Ashanti
85	"Dude"	Beenie Man featuring Ms. Thing
86	"Wanna Get to Know You"	G-Unit featuring Joe
87	"Holidae In"	Chingy featuring Ludacris and Snoop Dogg
88	"Let's Get It Started"	The Black Eyed Peas
89	"When the Sun Goes Down"	Kenny Chesney and Uncle Kracker
90	"American Soldier"	Toby Keith
91	"Change Clothes"	Jay-Z
92	"Don't Tell Me"	Avril Lavigne
93	"You'll Think of Me"	Keith Urban
94	"Happy People"	R. Kelly
95	"Hey Mama"	The Black Eyed Peas
96	"Over and Over"	Nelly featuring Tim McGraw
97	"Redneck Woman"	Gretchen Wilson
98	"Just Lose It"	Eminem
99	"Letters from Home"	John Michael Montgomery
100	"I Go Back"	Kenny Chesney

== See also ==
- 2004 in music
- Billboard Year-End Hot R&B/Hip-Hop Singles & Tracks of 2004
- Billboard Year-End Hot Rap Tracks of 2004
- List of Billboard Hot 100 number-one singles of 2004
- List of Billboard Hot 100 top-ten singles in 2004
