= Billboard Year-End Hot Rap Tracks of 2004 =

American music chart

This is a list of Billboard magazine's Top Hot Rap Tracks of 2004.

No.	Title	Artist(s)
1	"Lean Back"	Terror Squad
2	"Slow Motion"	Juvenile featuring Soulja Slim
3	"Freek-a-Leek"	Petey Pablo
4	"Tipsy"	J-Kwon
5	"Slow Jamz"	Twista featuring Kanye West and Jamie Foxx
6	"Overnight Celebrity"	Twista
7	"Dirt off Your Shoulder"	Jay-Z
8	"Splash Waterfalls"	Ludacris
9	"Sunshine"	Lil' Flip
10	"The Way You Move"	Outkast featuring Sleepy Brown
11	"Jesus Walks"	Kanye West
12	"Salt Shaker"	Ying Yang Twins featuring Lil Jon & the East Side Boyz
13	"One Call Away"	Chingy featuring J-Weav
14	"Hotel"	Cassidy featuring R. Kelly
15	"All Falls Down"	Kanye West featuring Syleena Johnson
16	"My Place"	Nelly featuring Jaheim
17	"On Fire"	Lloyd Banks
18	"Why"	Jadakiss featuring Anthony Hamilton
19	"Through the Wire"	Kanye West
20	"Game Over (Flip)"	Lil' Flip
21	"Damn!"	YoungBloodZ featuring Lil Jon
22	"Headsprung"	LL Cool J
23	"Stand Up"	Ludacris featuring Shawnna
24	"Drop It Like It's Hot"	Snoop Dogg featuring Pharrell
25	"I'm Still in Love with You"	Sean Paul featuring Sasha

== See also ==
- 2004 in music
- Billboard Year-End Hot 100 singles of 2004
- Billboard Year-End Hot R&B/Hip-Hop Singles & Tracks of 2004
- List of Billboard number-one rap singles of 2004
