= List of Hot R&B/Hip-Hop Singles & Tracks number ones of 2004 =

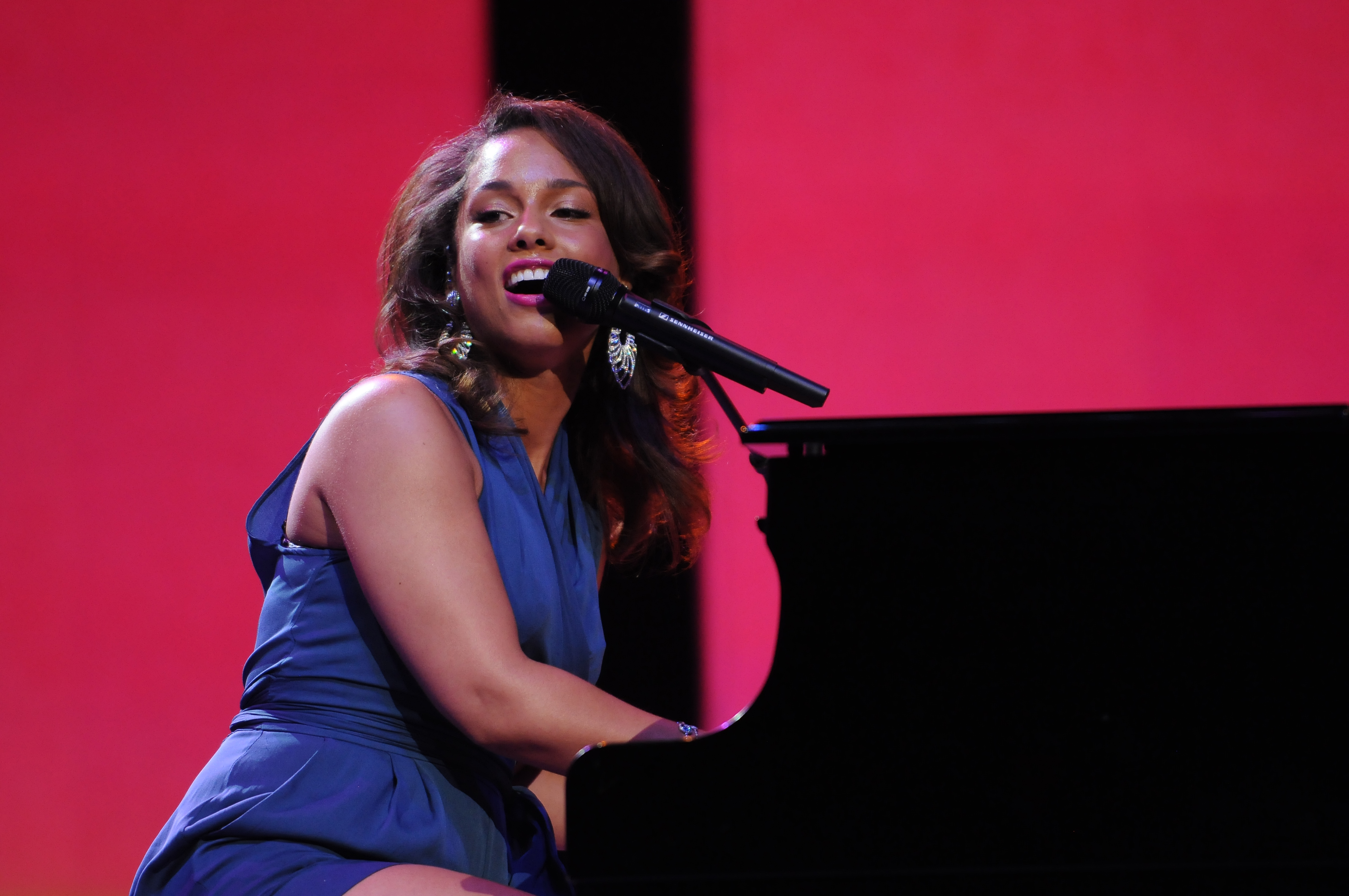
Alicia Keys had two number ones in the first half of 2004.

These are the Billboard R&B singles chart number-one singles of 2004.

== Chart history ==
Key
†	Indicates best-charting R&B single of 2004

Issue date	Song	Artist
January 3	"You Don't Know My Name"	Alicia Keys
January 10	"You Don't Know My Name"	Alicia Keys
January 17	"You Don't Know My Name"	Alicia Keys
January 24	"You Don't Know My Name"	Alicia Keys
January 31	"You Don't Know My Name"	Alicia Keys
February 7	"You Don't Know My Name"	Alicia Keys
February 14	"You Don't Know My Name"	Alicia Keys
February 21	"Slow Jamz"	Twista featuring Kanye West and Jamie Foxx
February 28	"Slow Jamz"	Twista featuring Kanye West and Jamie Foxx
March 6	"Yeah!"	Usher featuring Lil Jon and Ludacris
March 13	"Yeah!"	Usher featuring Lil Jon and Ludacris
March 20	"Yeah!"	Usher featuring Lil Jon and Ludacris
March 27	"Yeah!"	Usher featuring Lil Jon and Ludacris
April 3	"Yeah!"	Usher featuring Lil Jon and Ludacris
April 10	"Yeah!"	Usher featuring Lil Jon and Ludacris
April 17	"Yeah!"	Usher featuring Lil Jon and Ludacris
April 24	"Yeah!"	Usher featuring Lil Jon and Ludacris
May 1	"If I Ain't Got You" †	Alicia Keys
May 8	"If I Ain't Got You" †	Alicia Keys
May 15	"If I Ain't Got You" †	Alicia Keys
May 22	"If I Ain't Got You" †	Alicia Keys
May 29	"If I Ain't Got You" †	Alicia Keys
June 5	"Burn"	Usher
June 12	"Burn"	Usher
June 19	"Burn"	Usher
June 26	"Burn"	Usher
July 3	"If I Ain't Got You" †	Alicia Keys
July 10	"Confessions Part II"	Usher
July 17	"Confessions Part II"	Usher
July 24	"Lean Back"	Terror Squad
July 31	"Lean Back"	Terror Squad
August 7	"Lean Back"	Terror Squad
August 14	"Lean Back"	Terror Squad
August 21	"Lean Back"	Terror Squad
August 28	"Lean Back"	Terror Squad
September 4	"Lean Back"	Terror Squad
September 11	"Goodies"	Ciara featuring Petey Pablo
September 18	"Goodies"	Ciara featuring Petey Pablo
September 25	"Goodies"	Ciara featuring Petey Pablo
October 2	"Goodies"	Ciara featuring Petey Pablo
October 9	"Goodies"	Ciara featuring Petey Pablo
October 16	"Goodies"	Ciara featuring Petey Pablo
October 23	"My Boo"	Usher and Alicia Keys
October 30	"My Boo"	Usher and Alicia Keys
November 6	"My Boo"	Usher and Alicia Keys
November 13	"Drop It Like It's Hot"	Snoop Dogg featuring Pharrell
November 20	"Drop It Like It's Hot"	Snoop Dogg featuring Pharrell
November 27	"Drop It Like It's Hot"	Snoop Dogg featuring Pharrell
December 4	"Drop It Like It's Hot"	Snoop Dogg featuring Pharrell
December 11	"Drop It Like It's Hot"	Snoop Dogg featuring Pharrell
December 18	"Drop It Like It's Hot"	Snoop Dogg featuring Pharrell
December 25	"Drop It Like It's Hot"	Snoop Dogg featuring Pharrell

== See also ==
- 2004 in music
- Billboard Year-End Hot R&B/Hip-Hop Singles & Tracks of 2004
- List of number-one R&B hits (United States)
