= List of Billboard Hot 100 number ones of 2004 =

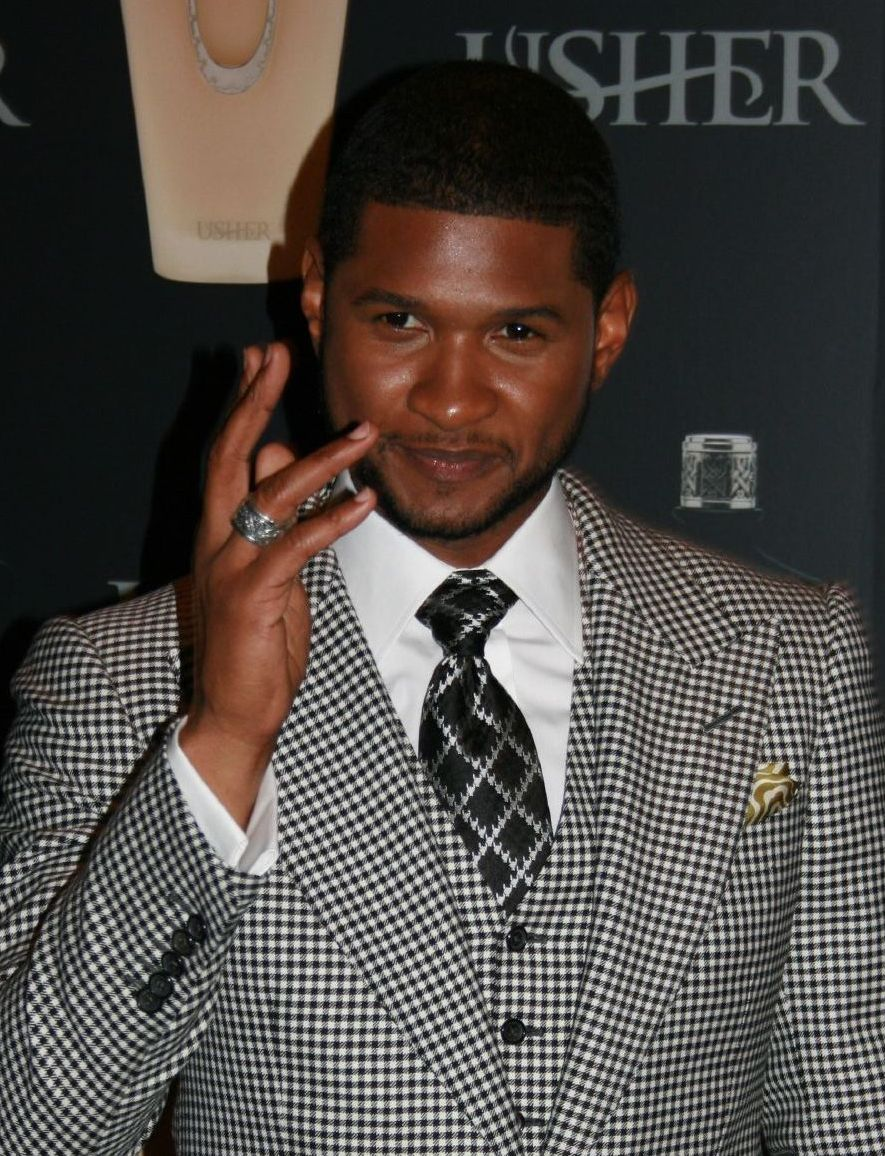
R&B singer Usher broke Billboard records with four number-one singles for 28 weeks on the top spot in a calendar year.

The Billboard Hot 100 is a chart that ranks the best-performing singles of the United States. Published by Billboard magazine, the data are compiled by Nielsen SoundScan based collectively on each single's weekly physical sales and airplay. In 2004, there were 11 singles that topped the chart. Although there were 12 singles that claimed the top spot in the 52 issues of the chart, hip hop duo Outkast's "Hey Ya!" began its peak position in 2003, and is thus excluded.

In 2004, 13 acts achieved their first U.S. number-one single, either as a lead artist or featured guest, including Sleepy Brown, Twista, Kanye West, Jamie Foxx, Lil Jon, Fantasia Barrino, Juvenile, Soulja Slim, Terror Squad, Ciara, Petey Pablo, Snoop Dogg, and Pharrell. Barrino and Ciara were the only acts to have earned a number-one debut single this year. R&B singer Usher had four number-one singles that appeared in the 2004 issues, and Outkast had two. Soulja Slim became the sixth artist to have a number one song posthumously, after his death in November 2003. During the year, seven collaboration singles reached the number-one position, tying the record set in 2003.

Usher's "Yeah!" is the longest-running number-one single of 2004, remaining in that position for 12 straight weeks. It is followed by his other single "Burn", whose streak on the top spot reached eight non-consecutive weeks. Other singles with extended chart runs include Ciara's "Goodies", which features Petey Pablo, and Usher's "My Boo", a duet with Alicia Keys, each topping the chart for seven and six weeks, respectively.

Usher is the most successful act of 2004. He had four singles that topped the Billboard Hot 100: "Yeah!, "Burn", "Confessions Part II", and "My Boo"; he is the only act in 2004 to have earned multiple number-one singles. Overall, Usher had 28 weeks on top in a calendar year, becoming the first act to have achieved such an extended chart run on the Billboard Hot 100. The feat broke the record set by Glenn Miller and His Orchestra in 1940; their records spent 26 consecutive weeks at the top spot of Record Buying Guide, a jukebox chart Billboard magazine published in the late 1930s and early 1940s. "Yeah!" is the best-performing single of the calendar year, having topped the Top Hot 100 Hits of 2004.

Following periods of fluctuating success, urban music attained commercial dominance during the early 2000s, which featured massive crossover success on the Billboard charts by R&B and hip hop artists. In 2004, all 12 songs that topped the Billboard Hot 100 were performed by African-American recording artists and accounted for 80% of the number-one R&B hits that year. Along with Usher's streak of singles, Top 40 radio and both pop and R&B charts were topped by OutKast's "Hey Ya!", Snoop Dogg's "Drop It Like It's Hot", Terror Squad's "Lean Back", and Ciara's "Goodies". Chris Molanphy of The Village Voice later remarked that "by the early 2000s, urban music was pop music."

== Chart history ==
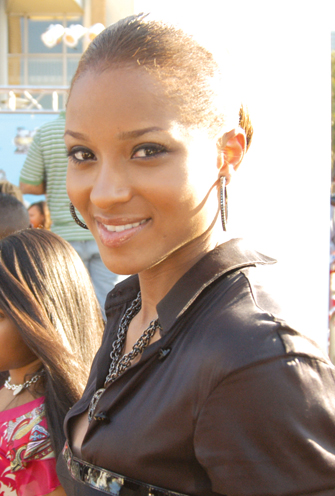
Singer Ciara's first number-one single, "Goodies", topped the chart for seven consecutive weeks.

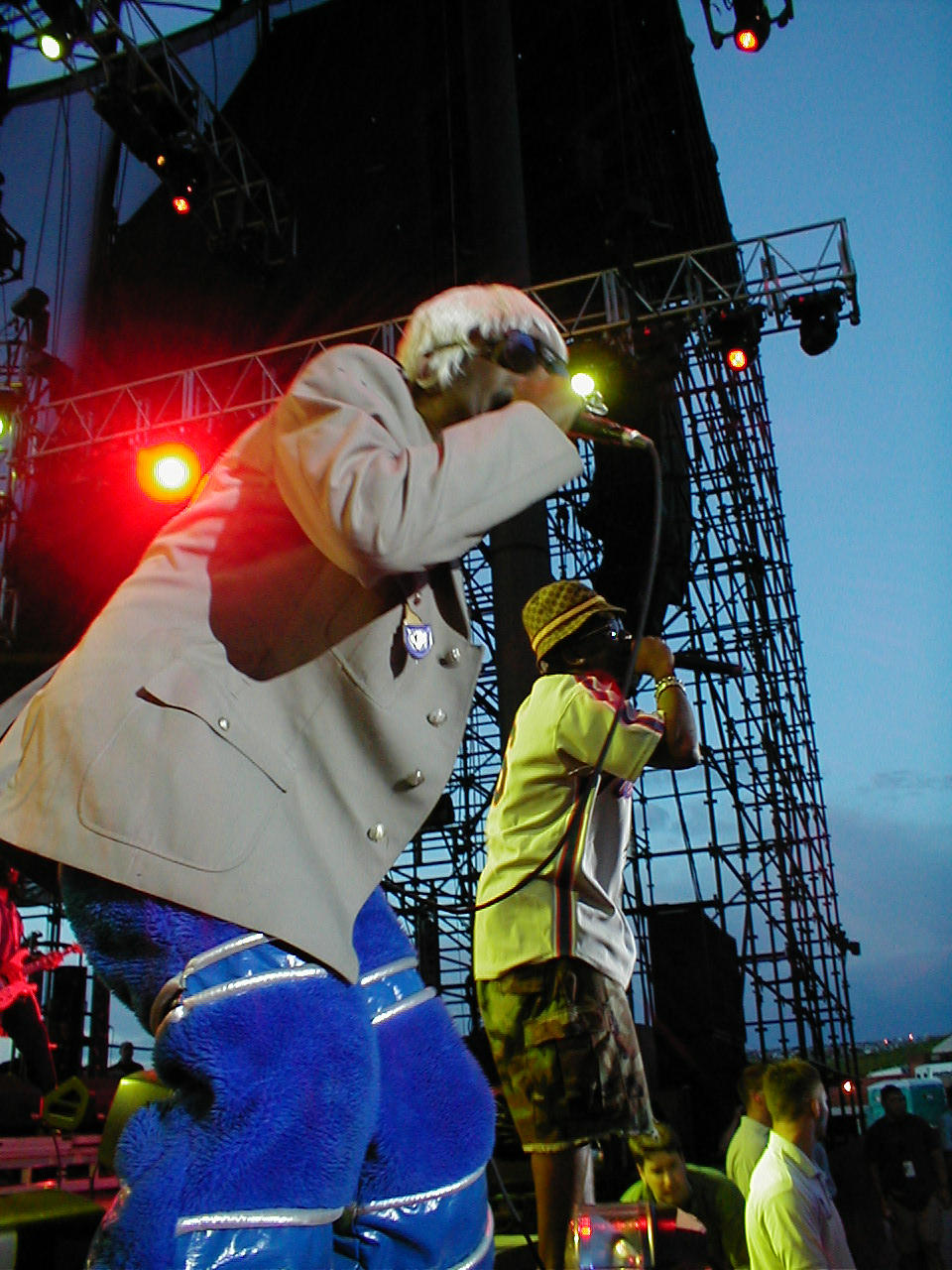
Hip hop duo Outkast's number-one single "Hey Ya!", self-replaced the top spot with their "The Way You Move".

Key
†	Indicates best-performing single of 2004

No.	Issue date	Song	Artist(s)	Ref.
899	January 3	"Hey Ya!"	OutKast	
899	January 10	"Hey Ya!"	OutKast	
899	January 17	"Hey Ya!"	OutKast	
899	January 24	"Hey Ya!"	OutKast	
899	January 31	"Hey Ya!"	OutKast	
899	February 7	"Hey Ya!"	OutKast	
900	February 14	"The Way You Move"	OutKast featuring Sleepy Brown	
901	February 21	"Slow Jamz"	Twista featuring Kanye West and Jamie Foxx	
902	February 28	"Yeah!" †	Usher featuring Lil Jon and Ludacris	
902	March 6	"Yeah!" †	Usher featuring Lil Jon and Ludacris	
902	March 13	"Yeah!" †	Usher featuring Lil Jon and Ludacris	
902	March 20	"Yeah!" †	Usher featuring Lil Jon and Ludacris	
902	March 27	"Yeah!" †	Usher featuring Lil Jon and Ludacris	
902	April 3	"Yeah!" †	Usher featuring Lil Jon and Ludacris	
902	April 10	"Yeah!" †	Usher featuring Lil Jon and Ludacris	
902	April 17	"Yeah!" †	Usher featuring Lil Jon and Ludacris	
902	April 24	"Yeah!" †	Usher featuring Lil Jon and Ludacris	
902	May 1	"Yeah!" †	Usher featuring Lil Jon and Ludacris	
902	May 8	"Yeah!" †	Usher featuring Lil Jon and Ludacris	
902	May 15	"Yeah!" †	Usher featuring Lil Jon and Ludacris	
903	May 22	"Burn"	Usher	
903	May 29	"Burn"	Usher	
903	June 5	"Burn"	Usher	
903	June 12	"Burn"	Usher	
903	June 19	"Burn"	Usher	
903	June 26	"Burn"	Usher	
903	July 3	"Burn"	Usher	
904	July 10	"I Believe"	Fantasia	
re	July 17	"Burn"	Usher	
905	July 24	"Confessions Part II"	Usher	
905	July 31	"Confessions Part II"	Usher	
906	August 7	"Slow Motion"	Juvenile featuring Soulja Slim	
906	August 14	"Slow Motion"	Juvenile featuring Soulja Slim	
907	August 21	"Lean Back"	Terror Squad	
907	August 28	"Lean Back"	Terror Squad	
907	September 4	"Lean Back"	Terror Squad	
908	September 11	"Goodies"	Ciara featuring Petey Pablo	
908	September 18	"Goodies"	Ciara featuring Petey Pablo	
908	September 25	"Goodies"	Ciara featuring Petey Pablo	
908	October 2	"Goodies"	Ciara featuring Petey Pablo	
908	October 9	"Goodies"	Ciara featuring Petey Pablo	
908	October 16	"Goodies"	Ciara featuring Petey Pablo	
908	October 23	"Goodies"	Ciara featuring Petey Pablo	
909	October 30	"My Boo"	Usher and Alicia Keys	
909	November 6	"My Boo"	Usher and Alicia Keys	
909	November 13	"My Boo"	Usher and Alicia Keys	
909	November 20	"My Boo"	Usher and Alicia Keys	
909	November 27	"My Boo"	Usher and Alicia Keys	
909	December 4	"My Boo"	Usher and Alicia Keys	
910	December 11	"Drop It Like It's Hot"	Snoop Dogg featuring Pharrell	
910	December 18	"Drop It Like It's Hot"	Snoop Dogg featuring Pharrell	
910	December 25	"Drop It Like It's Hot"	Snoop Dogg featuring Pharrell	

== Number-one artists ==
List of number-one artists by total weeks at number one
Position	Artist	Weeks at No. 1
1	Usher	28
2	Lil Jon	12
2	Ludacris	12
4	OutKast	7
4	Ciara	7
4	Petey Pablo	7
7	Alicia Keys	6
8	Terror Squad	3
8	Snoop Dogg	3
8	Pharrell	3
11	Juvenile	2
11	Soulja Slim	2
13	Sleepy Brown	1
13	Twista	1
13	Kanye West	1
13	Jamie Foxx	1
13	Fantasia	1

== See also ==
- 2004 in music
- Billboard Year-End Hot 100 singles of 2004
- List of Billboard number-one singles
- List of Billboard Hot 100 number-one singles of the 2000s

== Additional sources ==
- Fred Bronson's Billboard Book of Number 1 Hits, 5th Edition (ISBN 0-8230-7677-6)
- Joel Whitburn's Top Pop Singles 1955-2008, 12 Edition (ISBN 0-89820-180-2)
- Joel Whitburn Presents the Billboard Hot 100 Charts: The 2000s (ISBN 0-89820-182-9)
- Additional information obtained can be verified within Billboard's online archive services and print editions of the magazine.
