= My Boo (Usher and Alicia Keys song) =

2004 single by Usher and Alicia Keys

Single by Usher and Alicia Keys

from the album Confessions (Special Edition)
- Released: August 29, 2004
- Studio: Southside (Atlanta, Georgia); XXX (Paris, France)
- Genre: R&B
- Length: 3:42
- Label: LaFace
- Songwriters: Usher Raymond; Alicia Keys; Adonis Shropshire; Jermaine Mauldin; Manuel Seal
- Producers: Jermaine Dupri; Manuel Seal; No I.D. (uncredited)

Usher singles chronology
"Confessions Part II" (2004)	"My Boo" (2004)	"Lovers and Friends" (2004)

Alicia Keys singles chronology
"Diary" (2004)	"My Boo" (2004)	"Karma" (2004)

Music video
- "My Boo" on YouTube

"My Boo" is a duet between American R&B singers Usher and Alicia Keys, written by the artists alongside Adonis Shropshire, Manuel Seal, and Jermaine Dupri, the latter of whom produced it with No I.D.—who is uncredited. It was included on the re-release of Usher's fourth studio album, Confessions (2004). The song was released as the album's fourth single on August 29, 2004. In the United Kingdom and Ireland, it was released as a double A-side with "Confessions Part II".

The song received positive reviews from critics, being considered one of the best R&B collaborations of the 2000s. At the 47th Annual Grammy Awards the song won for Best R&B Performance by a Duo or Group with Vocals and was nominated for Best R&B Song.

Commercially the single stayed on top of the Billboard Hot 100 for six weeks, becoming Usher seventh and Keys' second number one on the chart. "My Boo" marked the third-most-successful single from the album after "Yeah!" and "Burn", respectively. It was also ranked as the 36th-biggest song of the 2000s decade in the United States and it has been certified quintuple-platinum by RIAA.

== Background ==
Usher and Alicia Keys had previously collaborated with the remix of Keys' 2004 single "If I Ain't Got You", which was released in the United Kingdom. During the production of Usher's fourth studio album, Confessions, they thought of various female singers to pair him with on the song. Usher and Kortney Kaycee Leveringston's rare demo version can be found floating on the Internet. Although it was and still is widely believed that it was Beyoncé. However, Jermaine Dupri, who co-wrote the song, felt that he had established good relationship with Keys since she had worked with him and Usher.

The song is written from the perspectives of Keys and Usher, who play the role of an ex-couple. For him, Usher and Keys "talk about how they used to be in love and how those feelings are still lingering despite the two not being involved anymore." For Keys, "The song is talking about the first person you ever really had feelings for. Even though you move on and meet new people, you always remember that first person."

== Release ==
"My Boo" was not included in the final track listing of Confessions (neither were "Red Light" or the songs Usher recorded with P. Diddy and The Neptunes). Instead, "My Boo" and "Red Light" were leaked to the Internet, along with other songs not included on the first album release. The song was included in the expanded version of Confessions, alongside "Red Light" and "Sweet Lies" (which were only released in the UK version of the album).

Dupri thought of releasing "My Boo" as the fourth single from Confessions once "Confessions Part II" would be leaving the charts. LaFace Records sent "My Boo" to US contemporary hit radio on August 29, 2004, and to US urban contemporary radio on August 30, 2004. The single was released in the United States as a 12" single on September 21, 2004. It was a double A-side with "Confessions Part II" when it was released in the United Kingdom on November 1, 2004.

== Composition ==
The song's production was supervised by Jermaine Dupri and Manuel Seal, with uncredited work by No I.D., who sampled 1977 song "He's All I've Got" by Love Unlimited in the song.

The lyrics are constructed in verse-chorus-chorus form. Usher starts the intro, and Keys followed her rap-intro, with background vocals from Usher. He proceeds to the first verse and chorus, leading to Keys singing another chorus, altering some of the lyrics of the original chorus to create a dialogue. Keys sings the second verse and Usher for the chorus, with background vocals from Keys. Keys repeats her version for the chorus. The song breaks with Usher and Keys singing "My oh, My oh, My oh, My oh, My Boo", one after the other. Usher repeats the chorus again, and they sing the intro of Keys.

== Critical reception ==
Through years, the song received positive reviews from critics, considering it one of the best songs of both Usher and Keys' discographies. In a 2004 review Jon Caramanica of Rolling Stone described the duet "sentimental". Heran Mamo of Billboard appreciated the singers "soaring harmonies" on the post-chorus. In a 2022 review Stereogum wrote that Usher and Keys are both "a premium on conveying intimacy" singing the song "gracefully, getting tons of warmth and fondness across", praising the production for using " a string-loop, a sighing ahh-ahh effect, strutting drums and acoustic-guitar noodles".

The collaboration was considered one of the best songs of 2000s and duets by critics. In 2011, Billboard ranked the song seventh on a special "The 40 Biggest Duets of All Time" listing. In 2020 Billboard also listed it into "The 25 Greatest Love Song Duets". In its "65 of the Best Songs from the 2000s" list, Harper's Bazaar wrote that the song "is the official puppy-love anthem centering on first kisses and playground flirtation". In March 2025, Vibe ranked the song at number one on their list of the 20 Greatest R&B Duets Of The 21st Century.

=== Accolades ===
Award nominations for "My Boo"
Year	Ceremony	Award	Result	Ref.
2005	ASCAP Rhythm & Soul Awards	Most Performed R&B/Hip-Hop Songs	Won	
2005	BET Awards	Best Collaboration	Nominated	
2005	Grammy Awards	Best R&B Song	Nominated	
2005	Grammy Awards	Best R&B Performance by a Duo or Group with Vocals	Won	
2005	MTV Video Music Awards	Best R&B	Nominated	
2005	MTV Video Music Awards Japan	Best Collaboration	Nominated	
2005	NAACP Image Awards	Outstanding Music Video	Nominated	
2005	Soul Train Music Awards	Best R&B/Soul Single – Group, Band or Duo	Won	
2006	ASCAP Pop Awards	Most Performed Pop Songs	Won	

== Chart performance ==
"My Boo" was successful in the United States, living up to the chart performances of "Yeah!", "Burn" and "Confessions Part II". The single debuted on the Billboard Hot 100 twenty-nine, the highest U.S. entry among all singles released from the album, and entered the top ten, two weeks after. The song peaked at number one during its eighth-week stay on the chart, becoming Usher fourth song to achieve it in 2004 and seventh in his career, while Keys' second number one on the chart. The single remained on the top for six weeks, beating its predecessor "Confessions Part II", which charted at number one for two weeks. It stayed on the top ten for nineteen weeks, leaving the chart after twenty-six weeks. The single was successful on Billboard component charts, topping the Hot R&B/Hip-Hop Songs and Hot Ringtones.

In Europe, the single had divided responses. The single reached the top five in the UK Singles Chart for two consecutive weeks, becoming Usher's eight top-five and Keys' second. It also became a top five hit in Germany, Netherlands, Norway and Switzerland and entered the top twenty in France, Finland and Switzerland.

== Music video ==
Directed by both Usher and music video director Chris Robinson, "My Boo" clip was filmed in New York City. The storyline of the video is a reflection of the song's lyrics. The footage starts with Usher in a living room watching a video for "Bad Girl", a song from Confessions. The "Bad Girl" intro features Usher singing the song in a club setting while admiring a scantily-dressed woman. He turns the set off and slumps down on the sofa before laying on it with his foot propped up. After a moment of silent, nostalgic reflection, he starts to sing the intro of "My Boo". The video then shows him and Alicia Keys in their separate quarters, preparing to head out, while singing their part of the song. Usher eventually steps out on streets of New York; likewise, Keys is out in her car. She leaves the car and walks down the street, and the couple meet up in the middle of Times Square, cuddling each other and on the brink of kissing. The music video debuted on MTV's TRL at number nine on September 16, 2004 and remained on the countdown for twenty-seven days.

The music video on YouTube has received over 180 million views as of May 2024.

== Live performances ==
The duo performed the song at the American Music Awards of 2004, with Keys playing piano alone singing for the first half of the song, and then she is joined by Usher.

Usher and Keys performed the song at the former's Super Bowl LVIII halftime show.

== Track listings ==
UK CD 1

1. "Confessions Part II"
2. "My Boo" (Duet with Alicia Keys)

UK CD 2

1. "Confessions Part II"
2. "My Boo" (Duet with Alicia Keys)
3. "Confessions Part II" (Remix) (featuring Shyne, Kanye West & Twista)
4. "Confessions Part II" (Music Video)

== Charts ==
=== Weekly charts ===
Weekly chart performance for "My Boo"
Chart (2004–2005)	Peak position
Austria (Ö3 Austria Top 40)	29
Belgium (Ultratop 50 Flanders)	21
Belgium (Ultratop 50 Wallonia)	24
Canada (Nielsen SoundScan)	1
Canada CHR/Pop Top 30 (Radio & Records)	4
Europe (Eurochart Hot 100)	7
Finland (Suomen virallinen lista)	14
France (SNEP)	19
Germany (GfK)	4
Ireland (IRMA) "Confessions Part II" / "My Boo"	7
Netherlands (Dutch Top 40)	5
Netherlands (Single Top 100)	6
Norway (VG-lista)	4
Romania (Romanian Top 100)	56
Scottish Singles Sales (Official Charts) "Confessions Part II" / "My Boo"	8
Sweden (Sverigetopplistan)	18
Switzerland (Schweizer Hitparade)	3
UK Singles (Official Charts) "Confessions Part II" / "My Boo"	5
UK Hip Hop/R&B (Official Charts) "Confessions Part II" / "My Boo"	3
US Billboard Hot 100	1
US Hot R&B/Hip-Hop Songs (Billboard)	1
US Pop Airplay (Billboard)	2
US Rhythmic Airplay (Billboard)	1

2024 weekly chart performance for "My Boo"
Chart (2024)	Peak position
Global 200 (Billboard)	123
Philippines (Philippines Hot 100)	98

=== Year-end charts ===
2004 year-end chart performance for "My Boo"
Chart (2004)	Position
Germany (Media Control GfK)	92
Netherlands (Dutch Top 40)	67
Netherlands (Single Top 100)	94
Switzerland (Schweizer Hitparade)	57
UK Singles (OCC) "Confessions Part II" / "My Boo"	56
UK Urban (Music Week) "Confessions Part II" / "My Boo"	3
US Billboard Hot 100	24
US Hot R&B/Hip-Hop Singles & Tracks (Billboard)	28

2005 year-end chart performance for "My Boo"
Chart (2005)	Position
Brazil (Crowley Charts)	2
Switzerland (Schweizer Hitparade)	69
US Billboard Hot 100	54
US Hot R&B/Hip-Hop Songs (Billboard)	35

=== Decade-end charts ===
Decade-end chart performance for "My Boo"
Chart (2000–2009)	Position
US Billboard Hot 100	36
US Hot R&B/Hip-Hop Songs	77

=== All-time charts ===
All-time chart performance for "My Boo"
Chart (2018)	Position
US Billboard Hot 100	200

== Certifications ==
Certifications for "My Boo"
Region	Certification	Certified units/sales
Canada (Music Canada) Physical sales	Platinum	10,000^{^}
Canada (Music Canada) Digital sales + streaming	3× Platinum	240,000^{‡}
Denmark (IFPI Danmark)	Gold	45,000^{‡}
Germany (BVMI)	Gold	150,000^{‡}
New Zealand (RMNZ)	4× Platinum	120,000^{‡}
United Kingdom (BPI)	Platinum	600,000^{‡}
United States (RIAA)	5× Platinum	5,000,000^{‡}
United States (RIAA) Mastertone	Platinum	1,000,000^{*}
^{*} Sales figures based on certification alone.^{^} Shipments figures based on certification alone.^{‡} Sales+streaming figures based on certification alone.

== See also ==
- List of number-one R&B singles of 2004 (U.S.)
- List of Hot 100 number-one singles of 2004 (U.S.)
- Billboard Year-End Hot 100 singles of 2004
- List of number-one singles from 2001 to 2007 (Canada)
