= Diary (Alicia Keys song) =

2004 single by Alicia Keys

Single by Alicia Keys featuring Tony! Toni! Toné!

from the album The Diary of Alicia Keys
- Released: May 24, 2004
- Studio: Kampo (New York City, NY); Soundwise (Amsterdam, Netherlands)
- Genre: R&B; soul
- Length: 4:44
- Label: J
- Songwriters: Alicia Keys; Kerry Brothers, Jr.
- Producer: Alicia Keys

Alicia Keys singles chronology
"If I Ain't Got You" (2004)	"Diary" (2004)	"My Boo" (2004)

Music video
- "Diary" on YouTube

"Diary" is a song by American singer-songwriter Alicia Keys from her second studio album, The Diary of Alicia Keys (2003). Written by Keys and Kerry Brothers, Jr. and produced by Keys, the song features the American group Tony! Toni! Toné! on bass, piano, guitar, organ and Wurlitzer, while Jermaine Paul provides uncredited additional vocals. It was released on May 24, 2004, as the album's third single. At one time, "Diary" had been released as a double A-side with "If I Ain't Got You".

"Diary" was nominated for Best R&B Performance by a Duo or Group with Vocals at the 2005 Grammy Awards. The song peaked at number eight on the Billboard Hot 100 and number two on the Hot R&B/Hip-Hop Songs. Its Hani remixes topped the Hot Dance Club Play chart in late 2004.

== Critical reception ==
Mark Anthony Neal of PopMatters said the "sparse production" of the song "gives Keys ample space to work out her ideas." Vibe's Jessica Bennett called the song an "R&B classic" and described it as "dark and moody, yet is filled with passion lyrically, musically and vocally, with both Keys and featured artist Jermaine Paul turning in a stellar vocal performances". In August 2025, the song was ranked at number 69 on Billboard's list of Top R&B/Rap Songs of the 21st Century.

== Music video ==
The single's music video, directed by Lamont "Liquid" Burrell, Rod Isaacs, Jeff Robinson, and Brian Campbell, contains footage of several live concerts from both 2004's Verizon Ladies First Tour, which Keys took part in, and her own 2005 The Diary Tour.

== The phone number ==
The song's lyrics tell listeners that they can reach Keys by calling a particular number, 489–4608, which was her former telephone number minus the area code when she lived in New York City, according to Keys' publicist, Lois Najarian. Callers who used the correct code (347) would have received a voicemail from Keys herself. However, after listening to the song, fans tried calling the number with different area codes, and one of them, 912, turned out to be the number of a retired pastor from Statesboro, Georgia, named J.D. Turner. He claims to have received more than twenty calls a day from Keys' fans in the weeks after the song's release. This led to a $95 phone bill resulting from charges associated with the *69 last-call return option, which he used to track down each caller. Turner has declined to change his number, having held it for fourteen years before the song's release. As of 2015, the number in the 347 area code is no longer in service and Turner retained it in the 912 code until his death in 2019.

== Track listings and formats ==
- US promotional CD single
1. "Diary" (Radio Edit) – 4:28
2. "Diary" (Instrumental) – 4:45
3. "Diary" (Call Out Hook) – 0:10
4. "Diary" (Radio Edit) (MP3 format) – 4:28
- US promotional 12" Maxi-single

A1. "Diary" (Radio Edit) – 4:28
A2. "Diary" (Instrumental) – 4:45
B1. "Diary" (Album Version) – 4:45
B2. "Diary" (Acappella) – 4:45

- US promotional 12" single (Hani Mixes)

A1. "Diary" (Hani Extended Club Mix) – 9:00
B1. "Diary" (Hani Mixshow) – 5:11
B2. "Diary" (Hani Dub) – 6:11

- Digital EP (Dance Vault Remixes)
1. "Diary" (Hani Mix) – 3:48
2. "Diary" (Hani Mixshow) – 5:10
3. "Diary" (Hani Extended Club Mix) – 8:58
4. "Diary" (Hani Dub) – 6:08
5. "Diary" (Music Video)

== Personnel ==
- Alicia Keys – piano, producer, background vocals, vocals
- Elijah Baker – bass
- Tony Black – engineer
- Kerry Brothers, Jr. – digital programming
- Manny Marroquin – mixing
- Ann Mincieli – engineer
- Jermaine Paul – background vocals
- Herb Powers Jr. – mastering
- Tim Christian Riley – piano
- John "Jubu" Smith – guitar
- Carl "Rev" Wheeler – Wurlitzer, organ
- Dwayne "D. Wigg" Wiggins – guitar

== Charts ==
=== Weekly charts ===
Weekly chart performance for "Diary"
Chart (2004)	Peak position
US Billboard Hot 100	8
US Adult R&B Songs (Billboard)	1
US Dance Club Songs (Billboard) Hani Mixes	1
US Dance Airplay (Billboard) Hani Mixes	3
US Hot R&B/Hip-Hop Songs (Billboard)	2

=== Year-end charts ===
2004 year-end chart performance for "Diary"
Chart (2004)	Position
US Billboard Hot 100	34
US R&B/Hip-Hop Songs (Billboard)	4

2005 year-end chart performance for "Diary"
Chart (2005)	Position
US R&B/Hip-Hop Songs (Billboard)	53

=== Decade-end charts ===
Decade-end chart performance for "Diary"
Chart (2000–2009)	Position
US R&B/Hip-Hop Songs (Billboard)	21

== Certifications ==
Certifications and sales for "Diary"
Region	Certification	Certified units/sales
United States (RIAA)	Platinum	1,000,000^{‡}
^{‡} Sales+streaming figures based on certification alone.

== Release history ==
Release dates and formats
Region	Date	Format(s)	Version(s)	Label(s)	Ref.
United States	May 24, 2004	Urban contemporary radio	Original	J	
United States	June 29, 2004	Digital download	Original	J	
United States	July 11, 2006	Digital download (EP)	Hani mixes	J	
Various	December 1, 2023	Digital download; streaming (EP)	Original; Hani mixes	Sony	

== See also ==
- List of number-one dance singles of 2004 (U.S.)
- Billboard Year-End Hot 100 singles of 2004
