= Confessions Part II =

2004 single by Usher

Single by Usher

from the album Confessions
- Released: June 1, 2004
- Recorded: July 2003
- Genre: R&B
- Length: 3:49
- Label: Arista
- Songwriters: Usher Raymond; Jermaine Mauldin; Bryan-Michael Cox
- Producer: Jermaine Dupri

Usher singles chronology
| "Burn" (2004) | "Confessions Part II" (2004) | "My Boo" (2004) |

Music video
- "Confessions Part II" on YouTube

Audio
- "Confessions Part II" on YouTube
- "Confessions Part II Remix" on YouTube

"Confessions Part II" is a song by American singer Usher from his fourth album Confessions. Written by Usher, Bryan-Michael Cox, and the song's producer Jermaine Dupri, its lyrics are about a man confessing to his woman about his impregnated mistress. This is a continuation of "Confessions Part I" which relates to a man's infidelity. Its personal content evoked rumors and early responses from the public even before its release, believing that Usher was asserting the truth; however, Dupri divulged that the story behind the album is about himself.

"Confessions Part II" received mixed reviews from critics. It was released as the third single from the album, following the success of "Burn". The single reached number one on the US Billboard Hot 100 for two weeks, becoming the album's third consecutive number-one single in America. Elsewhere, "Confessions Part II" charted within the top 10 in Australia, Denmark, Ireland, Scotland, and the United Kingdom.

== Background and release ==
When he started working on his fourth studio album Confessions after the release of his 2001 album 8701, Usher chose not to branch out much with musical collaborators. He instead chose to continue creating music with his previous producers. Usher again enlisted producer and songwriter Jermaine Dupri, who had produced songs for his two previous albums. Dupri approached Bryan-Michael Cox, asking him to become a collaborator. Cox has been a frequent partner of Dupri who had produced hits for Usher as well. Like "Burn", the second single from the album, Dupri and Cox conversed about a situation, creating the idea of the prospective song. However, they were concerned because they needed somebody to write such a song and they never thought Usher would do it. The concept became "Confessions".

Usher started recording the song in July 2003 in New York City. One day, before the night was over, Usher was singing about impregnating a mistress and becoming displeased, having found that she is three months pregnant. The theme of cheating inspired him and Dupri, and they then decided to produce two parts of "Confessions": Part I and Part II. Usher said that the former is a "dramatization where a guy confesses all the stuff he's been doing" against his woman. The latter speaks of impregnating a mistress.

While Confessions was still in production, Usher promised "real talk" in it. He decided "to let it all hang out by singing about some of his own little secrets, as well as a few bones from his homies' skeleton-filled closets." He explained: "All of us have our Pandora's boxes or skeletons in our closets. I let a few of them out, you know. I've got a lot to say. I've got a lot of things and stuff built in me that I just want to let go of." He further noted that, for the most part, the album's subject matter is "very personal". Dupri expected people to question some of the personal lyrics they associated in the song.

"Confessions Part II" was released as the third single from the album, following "Burn". The single was released in the United States as a 12-inch single on August 24, 2004. It was released in Germany on October 18, and Australia on October 26, 2004, featuring the album and remix version of the track and a song called "Whatever I Want". In the United Kingdom, it was issued as a double A-side with "My Boo", the fourth single from the album in other territories. The single was released in the country on November 1, 2004.

== Lyrical interpretation ==
Usher held few listening parties for the album prior to its release. Shortly after, people came up with different interpretations of "Confessions Part II", among other personal songs in the album. In 2006, Jermaine Dupri told MTV that, at the time of the song's recording, Usher's two-year relationship with TLC's Chilli was going to "flame-out", which partly contributed to the concept of "Burn". They finally broke up early in 2004 because of "irreconcilable differences and because the two found it almost impossible to make compromises" which partly triggered public speculation that some of the songs in the album are in reference to his personal struggle. They referred to the song speaking about Usher's "infidelity" to Chilli.

Alongside the "cheating" rumors, the public inferred from the lyrics that Usher had impregnated a mistress in real life. Usher, however, emphasized that he was not in a relationship or "got another girl pregnant" and he was singing a "character". The similarity of situations he faced before and experiences of his friends collectively inspired him to write the song. In the middle of rumors, Dupri admitted that the stories behind the songs in the album are his. He stated, "me cheating on my steady girlfriend, having a baby with that other woman and having to confess to everything that happened to my main girl." Behind rumors, Usher refuted in an interview with MTV News:

People assume things, because as I said, I pull from my personal experiences to make my music ... I never experienced [fathering a child outside of a relationship] firsthand, but it's something I wanted to talk about ... and it's something that has happened to me in the past ... As I said, I have a few deep, dark ones that I've kept stowed away in a closet for a minute ... That's why I take this time to speak to you guys and let you know really what it is ... I will tell you that I loved [Chilli] a lot and she obviously loved me; it just didn't work out. But cheating is not what caused the relationship to collide and crash. That ain't what broke it up.

== Composition ==
"Confessions Part II"
The song's lyrics centers on the narrator's confession about impregnating his mistress.

"Confessions Part II" is an R&B song composed in the key of F minor. Set in common time, the song is performed with a moderate groove. The song follows the chord progression of D♭maj_{7}-E♭-Fm_{7}, and Usher's voice spans from the low note of E♭_{4} to the high note of F_{6}. The lyrics are constructed in the inverted chorus-verse form. There are four choruses and two verses, and then a break between the third and final chorus which Usher speaks the lyrics.

The lyrics of "Confessions Part II" centers on a confession about impregnating a mistress. For the prelude, Usher tells his significant other that he impregnated his mistress. "Confessions Part II" apologizes what he had done in part one. Usher said of the song that right after he confessed with his real woman, he hoped she would still give him a chance. Dupri said that "Confessions Part II" is one of the songs which speak about breakups in relationships.

== Reception ==
Many critics found the song intriguing and came up with interpretations of it as well. Andrew McGregor of the BBC questioned if "Confessions Part II", as well as "Truth Hurts", are only "mere theatre" or telling the truth. Laura Sinagra of Rolling Stone focuses on how Usher admits in the song about impregnating a mistress. Sal Cinquemani of Slant Magazine commented that Usher was at an age when "getting his 'chick on the side'" seemed appropriate. Outside of rumors, Jem Aswad of Entertainment Weekly said that the best songs from the album were "Confessions Part II" and "Burn", which he described as having smooth melodies. Matt Cibula of Popmatters pointed out the lack of continuity in that in the second part, Usher claims he "barely knows the other lady", while in the first part, he already said that she was his ex-girlfriend. He furthered called it the "wimpiest" song on the theme of the album. Kelefa Sanneh of The New York Times called it a "tricky infidelity narrative".

"Confessions Part II" was nominated for Best R&B/Soul, Male at the 2005 Soul Train Music Awards. At the 2005 American Society of Composers, Authors and Publishers Pop Music Awards, Dupri received the ASCAP Golden Note Award for co-writing the song, alongside his many achievements and contributions to American popular music. British record company EMI was recognized as Publisher of the Year for the song, including "Burn" and songs by Alicia Keys, Beyoncé, Britney Spears.

== Chart performance ==
"Confessions Part II" lived up to the success of its predecessors in the United States, though not as overwhelmingly. The single debuted on the Billboard Hot 100 at number 48, a higher entry than those of "Yeah!" and "Burn" did, while "Yeah!" was still at the top of the chart and "Burn" at number three. It peaked at number one on July 27, 2004, replacing "Burn"'s eighth non-consecutive chart run, and stayed there for two weeks. It failed to match the number of days at top spot of the previous two releases, and remained on the top ten for 13 weeks. The single left the chart after 25 weeks. The single was certified three-times platinum by the Recording Industry Association of America on for reaching 3 million shipments.

Internationally, "Confessions Part II" had lesser success. The single debuted at number five in Australia, becoming its highest entry, and failed to reach a higher position. The single reached number five in the United Kingdom, peaked at number seven in Ireland, and below top ten in the Netherlands and France, where it reached #43

== Music video ==
The music video of "Confessions Part II" was co-directed by Usher and music video director Chris Robinson, who also directed the video for the album's fourth single, "My Boo". "Confessions (Interlude)" serves as the opening of the video. Set in a studio, Usher receives a phone message and finds out that he impregnated his mistress. After he speaks the spoken section of the interlude and gets in a car, "Confessions Part II" proceeds. Usher is set in a dark lit room, with only one chair. He occasionally shows a large ring on his ring finger. In the middle of the video, he lies on a piano and in his imagination, his woman and mistress are beside him. The next scene shows Usher in a brown car singing, goes out and kneels before his woman to confess. She refuses to listen and slaps Usher, then walks away. This led to Usher being sad and angry for losing his woman and becoming shirtless. Alone, Usher stands in front of a wide mirror, which breaks into pieces accompanied by a roaring sound, ending the same way "Confessions Part II" started, with him sitting on a chair.

The music video features actresses Angell Conwell and Robinne Lee as Usher's two love interests, as mentioned in the song.

The music video successfully charted on video programs. It debuted on MTV's Total Request Live on June 28, 2004, the same entry as "Burn". The music video reached number one on the countdown, and retired on September 15, 2004, at number seven. Like "Yeah!", "Confessions Part II" video remained on TRL for 50 days.

== Remixes and parodies ==
The official remix of "Confessions Part II" was included on the re-release of Confessions, and features additional verses by Usher, Shyne (rapped his verse on the phone while in prison), Kanye West, Twista and Jermaine Dupri. The song is also parodied by "Weird Al" Yankovic on his album Straight Outta Lynwood (2006) as "Confessions Part III", and features the singer confessing more minor or ridiculous actions, such as borrowing his partner's nose-hair trimmer or returning a gift from her for store credit.

== Track listings ==
UK CD 1

1. "Confessions Part II"
2. "My Boo" (Duet with Alicia Keys)

UK CD 2

1. "Confessions Part II"
2. "My Boo" (Duet with Alicia Keys)
3. "Confessions Part II" (Remix) (featuring Shyne, Kanye West & Twista)
4. "Confessions Part II" (Music Video)

== Charts ==
=== Weekly charts ===
Weekly chart performance for "Confessions Part II"
| Chart (2004) | Peak position |
|---|---|
| Australia (ARIA) | 5 |
| Australian Urban (ARIA) | 3 |
| Canada CHR/Pop Top 30 (Radio & Records) | 3 |
| Denmark (Tracklisten) | 8 |
| Europe (Eurochart Hot 100) | 7 |
| France (SNEP) | 43 |
| Ireland (IRMA) with "My Boo" | 7 |
| Netherlands (Dutch Top 40) | 14 |
| Scottish Singles Sales (Official Charts) with "My Boo" | 8 |
| UK Singles (Official Charts) with "My Boo" | 5 |
| UK Hip Hop/R&B (Official Charts) with "My Boo" | 3 |
| US Billboard Hot 100 | 1 |
| US Hot R&B/Hip-Hop Songs (Billboard) | 1 |
| US Pop Airplay (Billboard) | 7 |
| US Rhythmic Airplay (Billboard) | 1 |

=== Year-end charts ===
Year-end chart performance for "Confessions Part II"
| Chart (2004) | Position |
|---|---|
| Australia (ARIA) | 87 |
| UK Singles (OCC) | 56 |
| UK Urban (Music Week) "Confessions Part II" / "My Boo" | 3 |
| US Billboard Hot 100 | 12 |
| US Hot R&B/Hip-Hop Singles & Tracks (Billboard) | 10 |
| US Rhythmic Top 40 (Billboard) | 10 |

== Certifications ==
Certifications and sales for "Confessions Part II"
| Region | Certification | Certified units/sales |
|---|---|---|
| Australia (ARIA) | Platinum | 70,000^{‡} |
| Canada (Music Canada) | Platinum | 80,000^{‡} |
| New Zealand (RMNZ) | 2× Platinum | 60,000^{‡} |
| United Kingdom (BPI) | Platinum | 600,000^{‡} |
| United States (RIAA) | 3× Platinum | 3,000,000^{‡} |
| United States (RIAA) Mastertone | Gold | 500,000^{*} |
^{*} Sales figures based on certification alone.^{‡} Sales+streaming figures based on certification alone.

== See also ==
- List of Hot 100 number-one singles of 2004 (U.S.)
- List of number-one R&B singles of 2004 (U.S.)
