= Burn (Usher song) =

2004 single by Usher

Single by Usher

from the album Confessions
- Released: March 21, 2004
- Genre: R&B
- Length: 4:15
- Label: Arista
- Songwriters: Usher Raymond; Jermaine Mauldin; Bryan-Michael Cox
- Producers: Jermaine Dupri; Bryan-Michael Cox

Usher singles chronology
"Yeah!" (2004)	"Burn" (2004)	"Confessions Part II" (2004)

Music video
- "Burn" on YouTube

"Burn" is a song by American R&B singer Usher, which he wrote with Jermaine Dupri and Bryan-Michael Cox. The song was produced by Dupri and Cox for Usher's fourth studio album, Confessions (2004). A downtempo track about the breakup of a relationship, it was originally planned as the album's lead single, but "Burn" was pushed back after favorable responses for the song "Yeah!". "Burn" was eventually released as the second single from the album on March 21, 2004. "Burn" is considered to be one of Usher's signature hits.

"Burn" topped various charts around the world, including the US Billboard Hot 100 for eight non-consecutive weeks; it succeeded "Yeah!" at number one. Both singles gave Usher nineteen consecutive weeks at the top spot, longer than any solo artist of the Hot 100 era. "Burn" was certified platinum in Australia and United States and gold in New Zealand. The song was well received by critics and garnered award nominations. In 2009, it was named the 21st most successful song of the 2000s on the Billboard Hot 100 Songs of the Decade. This song won the 2005 Kids' Choice Award for Favorite Song.

== Background ==
When Usher planned to make a new record after his third album, 8701 (2001), he decided to not branch out much with collaborators and continue building music with his previous producers. Usher again enlisted record producer Jermaine Dupri, who had collaborated on his two previous albums, along with The Neptunes and R. Kelly, among others, to work on his fourth studio album, Confessions (2004). Dupri contacted his frequent collaborator Bryan-Michael Cox, who had also made hits like the 2001 single "U Got It Bad" for Usher. During an early session for the album, Dupri and Cox talked about a situation which later became "Burn". At that time, Usher's two-year relationship with TLC's Chilli was flaming out. They said, "Yo, you gotta let that burn ... That's a song right there", and started writing.

== Release ==
Usher submitted the album to his label Arista Records after he felt it was completed. After he and the company's then-president Antonio "LA" Reid listened to the songs, they felt the album needed a first single and that they needed to create one or two more songs, which caused the album's release to be postponed. Usher went back to the studio and collaborated with Lil Jon, who said, "He needed a single. They had 'Burn,' 'Burn' was hot, but they needed that first powerful monster. That's when I came in." They worked on few more tracks, including "Red Light", which was not included in the first release of the album, and "Yeah!", which features Ludacris and Lil Jon.

Label personnel were undecided as to what to consider as the lead single. Reid was considering whether "Yeah!" would be released then, being as they also had "Burn". Usher was doubtful if the former was the right choice, after he wanted an R&B record. Until "Yeah!" was leaked, "Burn" was chosen as the official first single from Confessions. "Yeah!", which was intended as a promotional song and a teaser for Usher's fans, was released to street DJs and mixtapes. However, the favorable response to the song led to a change; "Yeah!" was the lead single and "Burn" was set as its follow-up. "Burn" was sent to US rhythmic contemporary and urban contemporary radio stations on March 1, 2004. It was released commercially in the United States on March 21, 2004, as a CD single, digital download, and 7-inch single. In the United Kingdom, a CD and 12-inch single were issued on June 28, 2004.

== Lyrical interpretation ==
Usher decided about the new material "to let it all hang out by singing about some of his own little secrets, as well as a few bones from his homies' skeleton-filled closets." The public speculated that he was referring to his recent personal struggles, on which he promised a "real talk".

In early 2004, Usher broke up with Chilli due to "irreconcilable differences and because they found it almost impossible to make compromises." Usher said in an interview: "It's unfortunate when you have to let a situation go because it's not working", which added reference to the breakup. It was later revealed that Chilli in fact broke up with Usher because of cheating, and the media said otherwise because of the lyrics in the song, which was not based on their relationship. Dupri, however, confessed that his personal life is the real story of the album. Usher said he took inspiration collectively by looking at his friends' personal situations.

== Composition ==
"Burn" is a slow jam R&B ballad. The song is performed with a moderate groove. It is composed in the key of D-flat major. The melody line of the song has influences from "Ignition (Remix)" by R. Kelly. "Burn" has a combination of robotic noises, synthesized strings and guitar lines.

The lyrics are constructed in the traditional verse-chorus form. The song starts with a spoken intro, giving way to the first verse. It continues to the chorus, following the second verse and chorus. The bridge follows, leading to a break and finalizing in the chorus.

"Burn" was considered a "window to Usher's inner thoughts", along with the controversial track "Confessions" and "Confessions Part II". The song is about breakups and ending relationships. According to Matt Cibula of Popmatters, "Burn" is constructed from "two-step concept". In the lyrics "You know that it's over / You know that it was through / Let it burn / Got to let it burn", Usher breaks up with his woman but found her sad about feeling bad about what happened to their relationship. However, Usher says that she must deal with it before she can accept the truth. For the lines "It's been fifty-eleven days / Umpteen hours / I'm gonna be burnin' / Till you return", the direction changes after Usher realized that breaking up with her was a huge mistake and that he wanted her back.

== Critical reception ==
"Burn" was lauded by contemporary music critics. Jem Aswad of Entertainment Weekly complimented Dupri and Cox for producing what he called the "best song" from the album, along with "Confessions Part II", which they also produced. Aswad said the songs feature "mellifluous melodies". Laura Sinagra of Rolling Stone found Usher's singing a "sweet falsetto on the weepy breakup song ", adding, it "convincingly marries resolve and regret, but when it comes to rough stuff, there's still no 'u' in p-i-m-p." Cibula called the song brilliant and considers its step one and step two technique a hit. Jon Caramanica of Blender complimented the song for being the only "serviceable" track among all ballad-influenced songs in the album which "often drown in their own inanity." Andy Kellman of Allmusic considered "Burn" as one of the Usher's best moments in the album, together with "Caught Up", the final single from Confessions. Steve Jones of USA Today stated that Usher is singing about a relationship that cannot be saved because of the "flame has simply died".

"Burn" was nominated at the 47th Grammy Awards for Best Male R&B Vocal Performance and Best R&B Song. The song earned British record company EMI the "Publisher of the Year" at the American Society of Composers, Authors, and Publishers 2005 Pop Music Awards. In 2016, Complex ranked the song number two on their list of the 25 greatest Usher songs, and in 2021, American Songwriter ranked the song number four on their list of the 10 greatest Usher songs.

== Chart performance ==
"Burn" was another commercial success for Usher. In the United States, the single debuted on the Billboard Hot 100 at number sixty-five, months prior to its physical release. It reached the top spot on May 29, 2004, replacing "Yeah!"'s twelve-week run at number one. The single was beaten by Fantasia's 2004 single "I Believe", which charted on its debut. It returned to number one for one last week, before it was finally knocked off by the album's third single, "Confessions Part II". The single failed to remain on the top spot as long as "Yeah!" did, staying only for eight non-consecutive weeks. "Burn" was the fifth most-played song in 2004 for earning 355,228 total plays, alongside "Yeah!" which topped the tally with 496,805 plays. The single was certified four-times platinum by the Recording Industry Association of America for shipping 4,000,000 units. It became the second best-selling single in the United States, behind Usher's single "Yeah!". This gives him the distinction, alongside The Beatles in 1964, to have two of his singles occupying the top two spots on the Billboard Year-End Chart. Like "Yeah!", "Burn" helped Confessions remain on the top spot.

Internationally, several music markets responded equally well. In the United Kingdom, the single debuted at number one and stayed for two weeks. Across European countries, the single performed well, reaching the top ten in Denmark, Ireland, the Netherlands, Norway, and Switzerland. It entered the top twenty in Austria, Belgium, Germany, and Sweden. In Australia, the single debuted at number three and peaked at number two. The single was certified 2× platinum by the Australian Recording Industry Association for selling 140,000 units. In the 2004 year ender charts, "Burn" became the thirty-first best-selling single in Australia. In New Zealand, it peaked at number one for three weeks, and remained on the charts for twenty-three weeks. The single was certified gold by the Recording Industry Association of New Zealand.

== Music video ==
=== Background ===
The music video for "Burn" was directed by Jake Nava, who had produced a wide array of videos for Atomic Kitten, Beyoncé Knowles, among others. It was shot at the former Hollywood house of American popular singer Frank Sinatra. The video features model Jessica Clark. In the July 2008 issue of Vibe magazine, Usher told writer Mitzi Miller, "Women have started to become lovers of each other as a result of not having enough men." On June 26, 2008, AfterEllen.com writer Sarah Warn revealed that Jessica Clark, the lead in Usher's "Burn" music video, was in fact an openly gay model. In the article, Warn writes, "Maybe it's not a lack of men that's turning women gay, Usher – maybe it's you!"

=== Synopsis and reception ===
The video starts with Usher sitting on a sofa with a backdrop of his girlfriend. When the verse starts, Usher goes to a wide glass window pane, looking at his girlfriend swimming in the pool. The surface is aflame after she is immersed in the water. In the next scene, Usher and his mistress are having sex. While sitting on the edge of the bed, Usher reminisces about the moments he and his girlfriend had have in the same bed. The bedsheets burn, the scene then cutting to Usher riding a silver right-hand drive Aston Martin DB5 with a British registration - EGF 158B (the car was featured in the TV series Fastlane). The video cuts with the backdrop also burning. Continuing to the car scene, Usher stops as he sees his imaginary girl again. He gets out and dances, executing various hand routines. Video intercuts follow and the video ends with Usher standing. Right before the last chorus, the screen changes from a small screen to a full one with no framework.

The music video debuted on MTV's Total Request Live at number six on May 4, 2004, debuting with "Confessions Part II". The video reached the top spot and remained on the countdown for thirty-three days.

The music video on YouTube has received over 345 million views as of April 2024.

== Impact ==
Cox benefited from co-creating Confessions, as well as from the success of "Burn". He had previously contributed to records for Alicia Keys, B2K, Mariah Carey and Destiny's Child, but he felt 2004 introduced him to another landscape in the music industry. His contribution to this song elevated him to fame, and garnered more attention for his past work. "Burn" earned him two Grammy nominations. Cox said, "Everybody who does this for a living, dreams about being nominated. It's the ultimate accomplishment. I've always been the silent guy — I come in, do my job and head out. I like to leave all the glory and shine to others, but this is the validation that means the most to me. It also makes me want to work harder to get that same recognition again."

== Track listings ==
Digital single
No.	Title	Writer(s)	Producer(s)	Length
1.	"Burn" (radio mix)	Usher Raymond; Jermaine Dupri; Bryan-Michael Cox	Dupri; Cox^{[a]}	4:16
2.	"Burn" (instrumental)	Raymond; Dupri; Cox	Dupri; Cox^{[a]}	4:16

European maxi-single
No.	Title	Writer(s)	Producer(s)	Length
1.	"Burn" (radio mix)	Usher Raymond; Jermaine Dupri; Bryan-Michael Cox	Dupri; Cox^{[a]}	4:16
2.	"Burn" (Axwell radio edit)	Raymond; Dupri; Cox	Dupri; Cox^{[a]}; Axwell^{[b]}	3:33
3.	"Burn" (Full Phatt radio mix)	Raymond; Dupri; Cox	Dupri; Cox^{[a]}; Matt Ward^{[b]}	3:28

Notes

- ^{^[a]} signifies a co-producer
- ^{^[b]} signifies a remix producer

== Charts ==
=== Weekly charts ===
Weekly chart performance for "Burn"
Chart (2004–2005)	Peak position
Australia (ARIA)	2
Australian Urban (ARIA)	1
Austria (Ö3 Austria Top 40)	21
Belgium (Ultratop 50 Flanders)	18
Belgium (Ultratop 50 Wallonia)	28
Canada CHR/Pop Top 30 (Radio & Records)	3
Denmark (Tracklisten)	10
Europe (Eurochart Hot 100)	2
France (SNEP)	29
Germany (GfK)	11
Hungary (Single Top 40)	10
Ireland (IRMA)	2
Netherlands (Dutch Top 40)	9
Netherlands (Single Top 100)	12
New Zealand (Recorded Music NZ)	1
Norway (VG-lista)	10
Romania (Romanian Top 100)	12
Scottish Singles Sales (Official Charts)	2
Sweden (Sverigetopplistan)	18
Switzerland (Schweizer Hitparade)	10
UK Singles (Official Charts)	1
UK Hip Hop/R&B (Official Charts)	1
US Billboard Hot 100	1
US Hot R&B/Hip-Hop Songs (Billboard)	1
US Pop Airplay (Billboard)	2
US Rhythmic Airplay (Billboard)	1

Weekly chart performance for "Burn"
Chart (2024)	Peak position
UK Downloads	69

=== Year-end charts ===
2004 year-end chart performance for "Burn"
Chart (2004)	Position
Australia (ARIA)	31
Belgium (Ultratop 50 Flanders)	95
Germany (Media Control GfK)	80
Netherlands (Dutch Top 40)	84
Netherlands (Single Top 100)	83
New Zealand (RIANZ)	7
Switzerland (Schweizer Hitparade)	63
UK Singles (OCC)	27
UK Urban (Music Week)	17
US Billboard Hot 100	2
US Hot R&B/Hip-Hop Singles & Tracks (Billboard)	3
US Rhythmic Top 40 (Billboard)	6

2005 year-end chart performance for "Burn"
Chart (2005)	Position
Romania (Romanian Top 100)	92

=== Decade-end charts ===
Decade-end chart performance for "Burn"
Chart (2000–2009)	Position
US Billboard Hot 100	21

=== All-time charts ===
All-time chart performance for "Burn"
Chart (1958–2018)	Position
US Billboard Hot 100	147

== Certifications ==
Certifications and sales for "Burn"
Region	Certification	Certified units/sales
Australia (ARIA)	2× Platinum	140,000^{‡}
Canada (Music Canada)	Platinum	80,000^{‡}
New Zealand (RMNZ)	3× Platinum	90,000^{‡}
United Kingdom (BPI)	Platinum	600,000^{‡}
United States (RIAA)	4× Platinum	4,000,000^{‡}
United States (RIAA) Mastertone	Platinum	1,000,000^{*}
^{*} Sales figures based on certification alone.^{‡} Sales+streaming figures based on certification alone.

== See also ==
- List of number-one singles from the 2000s (New Zealand)
- List of number-one singles from the 2000s (UK)
- List of Hot 100 number-one singles of 2004 (U.S.)
- List of number-one R&B singles of 2004 (U.S.)
- List of Billboard Rhythmic number-one songs of the 2000s
