= Chingy discography =

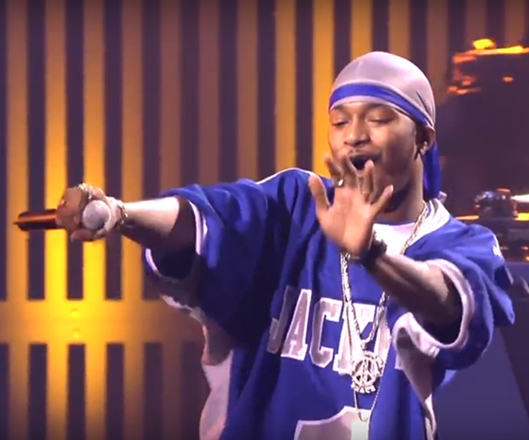
- Chingy performing at the 2004 Vibe Awards
- Studio albums: 5
- Extended plays: 2
- Singles: 15
- Music videos: 13
- Mixtapes: 8
- Independent albums: 1

The discography of American hip hop recording artist Chingy, consists of five studio albums, one extended play (EP), eight mixtapes and 13 singles.

== Albums ==
=== Studio albums ===
List of albums, with selected chart positions and certifications
Title	Album details	Peak chart positions									Certifications
Title	Album details	US	US R&B	US Rap	AUS	CAN	FRA	NL	NZ	UK	Certifications
Jackpot	Released: July 15, 2003; Label: DTP; Capitol; Format: CD, digital download	2	2	*	36	41	65	90	17	73	RIAA: 2× Platinum; MC: Gold; BPI: Silver; ARIA: Gold
Powerballin'	Released: November 16, 2004; Label: Slot-a-Lot, Capitol; Format: CD, digital download	10	5	*	49	39	—	—	22	124	RIAA: Platinum
Hoodstar	Released: September 19, 2006; Label: Capitol; Format: CD, digital download	9	3	2	100	40	195	—	39	151	RIAA: Gold
Hate It or Love It	Released: December 18, 2007; Label: Slot-A-Lot, DTP, Def Jam South; Format: CD, digital download	84	17	7	—	—	—	—	—	—	
Success & Failure	Released: September 7, 2010; Label: Real Talk; Format: CD, digital download	—	84	—	—	—	—	—	—	—	
"—" denotes items that did not chart or were not released. * - denotes ineligible Rap Albums Chart position before chart existed in 2004

=== Mixtapes ===
Chingy's mixtapes and details
Title	Album details
The Scratch Off Mixtape Vol. I	Released: 2005; Hosted by DJ Bishop and Hitmen DJ's; Presented by Slot-A-Lot Records
Global Warming	Released: January 12, 2009; Hosted by DJ Woogie; Presented by WorldStarHipHop
Fresh Thug Vol. 1	Released: January 24, 2009; Hosted by DJ Noize; Presented by Slot-A-Lot Records
1st Quarter	Released: May 12, 2009; Retail Mixtape
Stars & Straps Reloaded Vol. 1	Released: July 24, 2009; Hosted by Yung Dip, Kevin Hart and DJ Noize
The Mixtape	Released: November 10, 2009; Retail Mixtape
Jackpot Back	Released: March 6, 2012; Hosted by DJ Noize; Presented by Full Dekk Music Group
Chances Make Champions	Released: October 31, 2012; Hosted by DJ Noize; Presented by Full Dekk Music Group
FullDekk Fullosiphy	Released: May 13, 2013; Hosted by DJ Noize; Presented by Full Dekk Music Group

== Extended plays ==
Title	EP details
Pick 3 (with Mysphit and MGD)	Released: January 25, 2005; Label: 49 Productions; Formats: CD, digital download
Chingology (9 Year Theory)	Released: June 20, 2013; Label: DTP Full Dekk; Formats: CD, digital download
Chinglish	Released: June 16, 2023; Label: 369 Creative Mind; Formats: digital download

== Singles ==
List of singles, with selected chart positions and certifications, showing year released and album name
Title	Year	Peak chart positions								Certifications	Album
Title	Year	US	US R&B	US Rap	AUS	CAN	NL	NZ	UK	Certifications	Album
"Right Thurr"	2003	2	2	1	6	11	29	1	17	ARIA: Gold; MC: Gold; RMNZ: 2× Platinum	Jackpot
"Holidae In" (featuring Ludacris and Snoop Dogg)	2003	3	2	2	13	12	67	4	35	RIAA: Gold; ARIA: Gold; RMNZ: Gold	Jackpot
"One Call Away" (featuring J-Weav)	2004	2	3	1	5	—	52	3	26	RIAA: Gold; ARIA: Platinum; RMNZ: Platinum	Jackpot
"Balla Baby"	2004	20	17	7	19	6	33	7	34	RIAA: Gold; RMNZ: Gold	Powerballin'
"Don't Worry" (featuring Janet Jackson)	2005	—	60	—	—	—	—	—	—		Powerballin'
"Pullin' Me Back" (featuring Tyrese)	2006	9	1	1	35	18	—	12	44	RMNZ: Platinum	Hoodstar
"Dem Jeans" (featuring Jermaine Dupri)	2006	59	57	19	58	—	—	—	85		Hoodstar
"Let's Ride" (featuring Fat Man Scoop)	2007	—	—	—	—	—	—	—	85		Hoodstar
"Fly Like Me" (featuring Amerie)	2007	88	40	21	—	—	—	—	—		Hate It or Love It
"Gimme Dat" (featuring Ludacris and Bobby V)	2008	—	—	—	—	—	—	—	—		Hate It or Love It
"Down Thru Durr"	2010	—	—	—	—	—	—	—	—		Non-album singles
"Paperman"	2011	—	—	—	—	—	—	—	—		Non-album singles
"Let It Go"	2012	—	—	—	—	—	—	—	—		Non-album singles
"Can't Blame Me"	2022	—	—	—	—	—	—	—	—		Non-album singles
"—" denotes a title that did not chart, or was not released in that territory.

== Guest appearances ==
- 2003: "Shorty" (Busta Rhymes featuring Chingy, Fat Joe & Nick Cannon)
- 2003: "We Got" (Ludacris featuring I-20, Tity Boi & Chingy)
- 2003: "Hot & Wet (Remix)" (112 featuring Ludacris & Chingy)
- 2004: "Can't Stop Won't Stop (Remix)" (Young Gunz featuring Chingy)
- 2004: "I Like That" (Houston featuring Chingy, Nate Dogg & I-20)
- 2004: "Fightin' in the Club" (I-20 featuring Lil Fate, Tity Boi & Chingy)
- 2004: "Tipsy (Remix)" (J-Kwon featuring Chingy & Murphy Lee)
- 2004: "Circus Music" (Suga Free featuring Chingy)
- 2005: "Country Boy (Remix)" (Tyra featuring Chingy & Trillville)
- 2005: "Baller" (Young Buck featuring Lil Flip & Chingy)
- 2005: "Get Down" (DJ Quik featuring Chingy)
- 2005: "Ride Out" (Mack 10 featuring Chingy)
- 2005: "My Lowrider" (The Game featuring Chingy, Techniec, E-40, Crooked I, Lil Rob, Paul Wall, Ice Cube & WC)
- 2006: "Do It to It (Remix) (Cherish featung Chingy, Yung Joc, Jody Breeze & Fabo)
- 2007: "Bartender (Remix)" (T-Pain featuring Chingy & Akon)
- 2007: "My Drink n My 2 Step Remix" (Cassidy featuring Chingy, Swizz Beatz & Jermaine Dupri)
- 2007: "Celebrity Chick" (with Steph Jones & Small World)
- 2008: "So Fly (Remix)" (Slim featuring Chingy, Chamillionaire, Big Boi, Trey Songz, Shawty Lo & Yung Joc)
- 2008: "My Lady" (Tydis featuring Chingy)
- 2008: "Wanna Balla" (Soulja Boy Tell'em featuring Chingy, Gucci Mane & Nicki Minaj)
- 2009: "Donk Dat" (Yung Ro featuring Chingy & City Spud)
- 2010: "Look at Her Go (Remix)" (Gena featuring Murphy Lee, Chingy & Jibbs)
- 2016: "Him" (Omega Crosby featuring Chingy)
- 2016: "Get Down" (Solberjum featuring Chingy)
- 2018: "Marylin" (Three Guests featuring Chingy)
- 2018: "Made It" (Three Guests featuring Chingy)
