= New Zealand top 50 singles of 2004 =

This is a list of the top 50 singles in 2004 in New Zealand.

== Chart ==
Key
† – Song of New Zealand origin (Note: Whether or not a song is of New Zealand origin is determined by the RIANZ)

Rank	Artist	Single
1	Ben Lummis	"They Can't Take That Away"† from the album, One Road
2	Usher featuring Ludacris & Lil Jon	"Yeah!" from the album, Confessions
3	Eamon	"Fuck It (I Don't Want You Back)" from the album, I Don't Want You Back
4	Misfits of Science	"Fools Love"† from the album, MOS Presents
5	Jamelia	"Superstar" from the album, Thank You
6	Dei Hamo	"We Gon' Ride"† from the album, First Edition
7	Usher	"Burn" from the album, Confessions
8	D12	"My Band" from the album, D12 World
9	Baby Bash featuring Frankie J	"Suga Suga" from the album, The Smokin' Nephew
10	Nelly featuring Jaheim (My Place)	"My Place"/"Flap Your Wings" from the albums, Suit (My Place) & Sweat (Flap Your Wings)
11	Britney Spears	"Toxic" from the album, In The Zone
12	P-Money featuring Scribe	"Stop the Music"† from the album, Magic City
13	Michael Murphy	"So Damn Beautiful"† from the album, No Place To Land
14	Scribe	"Dreaming"† from the album, The Crusader
15	The Black Eyed Peas	"Shut Up" from the album, Elephunk
16	Mario Winans featuring Enya & P. Diddy	"I Don't Wanna Know" from the album, Hurt No More
17	Fast Crew	"I Got"† from the album, Set The Record Straight
18	The Rasmus	"In the Shadows" from the album, Dead Letters
19	NZ Idol - The Final 10	"Yesterday Was Just the Beginning of my Life"† from the New Zealand Idol Homegrown compilation album
20	Mase	"Welcome Back" from the album, Welcome Back
21	Guy Sebastian	"Angels Brought Me Here" from the album, Just As I Am
22	Adeaze featuring Aaradhna	"Getting Stronger"† from the album, Always & For Real
23	Chingy, Ludacris & Snoop Dogg	"Holidae In" from the album, Jackpot
24	Jojo	"Leave (Get Out)" from the album, JoJo
25	Kelis	"Trick Me" from the album, Tasty
26	Houston featuring Chingy, Nate Dogg & I-20	"I Like That" from the album, It's Already Written
27	Kelis	"Milkshake" from the album, Tasty
28	Seether featuring Amy Lee	"Broken" from The Punisher: The Album soundtrack
29	Natasha Bedingfield	"These Words" from the album, Unwritten
30	Chingy featuring Jason Weaver	"One Call Away" from the album, Jackpot
31	Adeaze	"A Life With You"† from the album, Always & For Real
32	Eminem	"Just Lose It" from the album, Encore
33	J-Kwon	"Tipsy" from the album, Hood Hop
34	The Black Eyed Peas	"Hey Mama" from the album, Elephunk
35	Limp Bizkit	"Behind Blue Eyes" from the album, Results May Vary
36	Evanescence	"My Immortal" from the album, Fallen
37	The Black Eyed Peas	"Let's Get It Started" from the album, Elephunk
38	Shannon Noll	"What About Me?" from the album, That's What I'm Talking About
39	Maroon 5	"This Love" from the album, Songs About Jane
40	Christina Milian featuring Fabolous	"Dip It Low" from the album, It's About Time
41	Adeaze	"How Deep Is Your Love"† from the album, Always & For Real
42	Outkast	"Roses" from the album, Speakerboxxx/The Love Below
43	Hoobastank	"The Reason" from the album, The Reason
44	D12	"How Come" from the album, D12 World
45	Bubba Sparxxx	"Back in the Mud" from the album, Deliverance
46	Mareko featuring Deceptikonz	"Stop, Drop and Roll"† from the album, White Sunday
47	Outkast	"Hey Ya!" from the album, Speakerboxxx/The Love Below
48	Twista featuring Kanye West & Jamie Foxx	"Slow Jamz" from the album, Kamikaze
49	The Darkness	"I Believe in a Thing Called Love" from the album, Permission To Land
50	Outkast	"The Way You Move" from the album, Speakerboxxx/The Love Below

== Chart by numbers ==
=== Origin ===
==== By artist ====
The following shows the country of origin from where the artist (including any featured artist where applicable) originate from. Artists who appear more than once have only been tallied once.

Country	Total
United States	37
New Zealand	13
England	4
Australia	2
Ireland	1
Finland	1
South Africa	1

Notes
- Natasha Bedingfield was born in England and holds New Zealand citizenship through her parents as such both countries have been counted.
- While the song, Broken was released by South African band, Seether, the song also features American singer, Amy Lee and as such both countries have been included.

==== By single ====
The following shows the country of origin from which the singles originate regardless of who the artist is.

Country	Total
United States	34
New Zealand	11
England	3
Australia	1
Sweden	1

=== Most singles ===
Shows the artists with the most singles to appear in this chart. Includes where they appear as a featured artist.

Artist	Total
The Black Eyed Peas	3
Adeaze	3
Outkast	3
Chingy	3
Usher	2
D12	2
Kelis	2
Scribe	2
Ben Lummis	2
Michael Murphy	2
Eminem	3
Ludacris	2
Amy Lee	2

Notes
- Ben Lummis and Michael Murphy have been included as having released two singles as they released their solo singles and were part of the New Zealand Idol collaboration single.
- Eminem has been included twice as he released his single and is a member of the group, D12.
- Amy Lee appears twice as a featured artist alongside Seether for the song Broken and as part of Evanescence.
- Ludacris appears above even though he didn't release a solo single but was a featured artist in Yeah! by Usher and Holidae In by Houston

=== Format ===
The following shows where each single appears on, whether it was the artists album, a non-album single, an extended play or as part of a soundtrack.

Format	Total
Albums	47
Soundtracks	2
non-album singles	1

Notes
- The song "Broken" appears on the soundtrack The Punisher: The Album and the album Disclaimer II, both by Seether.
- The song "Yesterday Was Just the Beginning of My Life" appears on the compilation album NZ Idol - Homegrown.
- The song "My Place"/"Flap Your Wings" is a double A-side from two albums Suit and Sweat.

=== Multiple releases ===
The following shows singles that had multiple releases from the same album.

Title	Total	Singles
Elephunk (The Black Eyed Peas)	3	Shut Up; Hey Mama; Let's Get It Started
Always & for Real (Adeaze)	3	Getting Stronger; A Life With You; How Deep Is Your Love
Speakerboxxx/The Love Below (Outkast)	3	Roses; Hey Ya! The Way You Move
Jackpot (Chingy)	3	Holidae In; One Call Away; I Like That (as featured)
Confessions (Usher)	2	Yeah! Burn
Tasty (Kelis)	2	Trick Me; Milkshake
D12 World (D12)	2	My Band; How Come

=== Type ===
The following shows the denomination that each single was released as, whether as a solo artist or as part of a group, band or duo. Also shows how many singles had guest artists.

Type	Total
Solo artists	31
Groups	19
Featured Artists	18
Collaborations	3

Notes
- The Top 10 New Zealand Idol contestants having released a single have been classed as a collaboration in this instance.
