= Don't Worry (Chingy song) =

2005 single by Chingy

Single by Chingy featuring Janet Jackson

from the album Powerballin'
- Released: January 3, 2005
- Genre: Hip-hop, R&B
- Length: 4:27
- Label: Capitol
- Songwriters: Howard Bailey; Alonzo Lee, Shamar Daugherty; Raphael Saadiq; Erika Taylor
- Producer: The Trak Starz

Chingy singles chronology
"Balla Baby" (2004)	"Don't Worry" (2005)	"Pullin' Me Back" (2006)

Janet Jackson singles chronology
"All Nite (Don't Stop)" (2004)	"Don't Worry" (2005)	"Call on Me" (2006)

"Don't Worry" is a song by American rapper Chingy with guest vocals from singer Janet Jackson, released as the second promotional single from his second album Powerballin', which sold over two million copies worldwide and served as the follow-up to his debut album Jackpot. A music video was not filmed.

The song was produced by Grammy Award-winning producers The Trak Starz, who also worked with Britney Spears, Usher, and Ludacris, and also produced Chingy's prior chart-topping hits "Right Thurr", "Holidae In", and "One Call Away".

== Song information ==
Jackson rarely collaborates with other artists and initially refused to provide guest vocals on "Don't Worry", as well as denying a request to appear on Chingy's then-rival Nelly's "Tilt Ya Head Back" (although she would later collaborate with him on her single "Call on Me"). After Chingy, the song's producers The Trak Starz, and their manager Larry Rudolph persisted her over a period of several months, she eventually agreed to lend her vocals to the song.

"Don't Worry" was released as the second single from Chingy's second album "Powerballin'", which sold over two million copies worldwide and served as the follow-up to his debut Jackpot.

Chingy's official biography mentions the song, reading "Then, on the romantic, Janet Jackson duet "Don't Worry," Chingy expresses his love for and dedication to the lady in his life over a smooth sound bed from The Trak Starz, who also delivered Jackpot's third smash single, "One Call Away." "I like your style, your grace/Your beautiful face, your essence," Chingy raps with a gentle touch." "Don't Worry" contains an interpolation of Tony! Toni! Toné!'s "Just Me and You", which appeared on the Boyz n the Hood soundtrack.

== Critical reception ==
"Don't Worry" received positive reviews from critics, who mainly praised Jackson's high-profile guest appearance as adding an important element to the song and also gave acclaim to Chingy for attempting a slower tempo, more ballad-driven and heartfelt style.

USA Today exclaimed the rapper's biggest career achievement to be convincing Jackson to feature on the song: "His biggest coup is landing Janet Jackson to coo the hook on the ballad Don't Worry. With that, he's found just the ticket for staying in the rotation at radio." Billboard described it as a "feel-good, R&B groove" enhanced by Jackson's "trademark" vocals, adding the song "finds the young rapper discoursing on relationship highs and lows. In Chingy's worldview, there is no need to worry, because in the end, he will still be together with his beloved. Janet Jackson underscores the message with her trademark sexual whisper", reciting the song's chorus ("Just me and you/Ooh Chingy/It don't matter what we go through/Just me and you/Ooh Chingy/I'll always be down for you/So don't worry about a damn thing").

Vibe called Janet's vocals "dreamy", saying "he concedes bling is nothing without someone to share it with on the ballad "Don't Worry," which features Janet Jackson's dreamy vocals". The magazine also praised Jackson for her contribution and addition of her trademark "sex-and-shock appeal", ultimately concluding Jackson's appearance as sounding "sweet". Contemporary Musicians: Profiles of the People in Music, Volume 53 author Angela Pilchak praised Chingy for attempting a new style, exclaiming the song "tested the R&B waters", calling "Don't Worry" a "ballad" which "gave him respect". The LA Times considered "Don't Worry" to be "touching", aided by Janet's "breathy" guest vocals, as well as describing it as more satisfying than his previous singles, writing "Chingy improves on and refines his successful sonic and thematic formula in an album more consistent and satisfying than its predecessor. The touching "Don't Worry," featuring breathy guest vocals from Janet Jackson, shows Chingy's sensitive and romantic sides".

People Magazine declared the collaboration to be a "Sexy slow jam" and gave acclaim to Janet's vocals, proclaiming "Janet Jackson turns up on the sexy slow jam "Don't Worry", and the way she coos "Oh, Chingy" should have the singer's [then] boyfriend, music producer Jermaine Dupri, worried." BBC UK gave a similar analysis of Janet's vocals as "choral seduction", also giving the rapper acclaim for landing a guest spot by Jackson, saying "The rapper even caught the attention of the sultry Janet Jackson, who provides her choral seduction on the decent rap ballad “Don’t Worry”. AllMusic considered the song "naughty" with a "sleepwalking" appearance.

In another critique, Billboard noted "Don't Worry" to be a contrast from Chingy's previous releases, certifying it as "more R&B-influenced fare" which is "equally effective" as his prior hits. Entertainment Weekly gave the song overall praise and considered the single as competition for then-rival Nelly's string of chart-topping hits, questioning if Chingy's "slick, articulate boogie rap" would "get Nelly to wondering if the Lou is big enough for the both of them."

== Track listings ==
Promo single (DPRO 7087 6 19110 2 2)

1. "Don't Worry" (Album Version) – 4:28
2. "Don't Worry" (Instrumental) – 4:25

UK vinyl (Y 7243 8 72520 1 1)

A1. "Don't Worry" (Album Version) – 4:28
A2. "Don't Worry" (Instrumental) – 4:25
B1. "Make That Thang Talk" (Radio Edit – Extra Clean)
B2. "Make That Ass Talk" (Radio Edit)
B3. "Make That Ass Talk" (Instrumental)

== Charts ==
Chart (2005)	Peak position
US Billboard Hot R&B/Hip-Hop Songs	60
US Rhythmic Airplay (Billboard)	28
