= Robots (2005 soundtrack) =

Robots: Music from the Original Motion Picture

Soundtrack album by Various artists
- Released: March 1, 2005
- Recorded: 2004
- Studios: 5 Cat Studios; Avatar Studios, New York, NY; Circle In The Square, New York, NY; Flyte Tyme West, The Village Recorders, Los Angeles, CA; Magnet Vision Studios, Santa Monica, CA; Pulse Recording, Los Angeles, CA; Stratosphere Sound, New York, NY; The Blue Man Studios; The Studio, Philadelphia, PA
- Genres: Pop; alternative rock; pop rock; R&B; hip hop; funk; soul
- Length: 41:09
- Labels: Virgin; Fox Music
- Producer: Various

Robots: Music from the Original Motion Picture is the soundtrack of the 2005 feature film Robots. The soundtrack was issued in March 2005 by Virgin Records and Fox Music. The album also reached No. 13 on the Billboard Soundtracks chart. The soundtrack contains music that were from scenes from the movie.

The Japanese dub uses "Mawaru Sora" written by Hitomi Yaida for its ending theme. The theme song for most European and Australian releases is "From Zero to Hero" by Sarah Connor. The British release of the film uses "See Me" by Melanie Blatt. The Latin American dub uses "Un Héroe Real" by Aleks Syntek.

== Critical reception ==
Professional ratings
Review scores
Source	Rating
AllMusic	3/5 stars

Heather Phares of AllMusic noted that the soundtrack "does create a feel-good, party-time mood".

== Track listing ==
No.	Title	Performer	Length
1.	"Shine"	Ricky Fanté	4:08
2.	"Right Thurr"	Chingy	4:12
3.	"Tell Me What You Already Did"	Fountains of Wayne	1:59
4.	"Wonderful Night"	Fatboy Slim featuring Lateef	2:46
5.	"Get Up Offa That Thing" (Ali Dee Remix)"	James Brown	3:40
6.	"(There's Gotta Be) More to Life"	Stacie Orrico	3:23
7.	"Love's Dance"	Earth, Wind & Fire	4:29
8.	"Low Rider"	War	3:15
9.	"I Like That"	Houston featuring Chingy, Nate Dogg and I-20	3:58
10.	"Silence"	Gomez	2:55
11.	"Walkie Talkie Man"	Steriogram	2:15
12.	"Robot City"	John Powell featuring Blue Man Group	4:09
Total length:			41:09

== Charts ==
Album – Billboard
Year	Chart	Position	Country
2005	Billboard Soundtracks	13	US
