= Holiday Inn (disambiguation) =

Holiday Inn is a hotel chain.

Holiday Inn may also refer to:

- Holiday Inn Express, Holiday Inn's limited service brand
- Holiday Inn (film), a 1942 film starring Bing Crosby and Fred Astaire
  - Song Hits from Holiday Inn, a 1942 studio album of songs from the film
  - Holiday Inn (soundtrack), a true soundtrack album from the film, release in 1979
  - Holiday Inn (musical), a 2016 Broadway musical based on the film
- "Holiday Inn", a song by Elton John from the 1971 album Madman Across the Water
- "Holidae In", a song by Chingy from the 2003 album Jackpot
