= The Trak Starz =

American hip-hop production duo

- Origin: St. Louis, Missouri, U.S.
- Genres: Hip hop, pop, R&B
- Occupations: Record producers; audio engineers; songwriters
- Years active: 2000–present
- Label: Trak Starz
- Members: Alonzo "Zo" Lee Jr. Shamar "Sham" Daugherty
- Website: MySpace

The Trak Starz are an American hip hop songwriting and record production duo from St. Louis, composed of Alonzo "Zo" Lee Jr. and Shamar "Sham" Daugherty.

== Biography ==
Prior to forming the Trak Starz in 2000, Zo played in numerous reggae and funk bands including Reggae At Will and Dr. Zhivegas, while Sham was in a group called Out of Order. Zo produced tracks for various regional rappers. After producing a few tracks for Sham's Out of Order group the two began producing together, forming the Trak Starz. Soon after, the newly formed partners produced an album for Da Hol’ 9, a group that was signed to MCA Records. They also received production credits on albums for Bone Thugs-n-Harmony, Krayzie Bone and Tyrese, as well as producing background music for various MTV shows. After their work with Da Hol’ 9 and other artists, The Trak Starz were managed by Chaka Zulu, whose connections helped them sign fellow St. Louis act Chingy to Disturbing tha Peace Records. The three began working on Chingy's solo album. According to Zo:

We had a two-bedroom apartment in University City, Missouri where one room had a Pro-Tools set up, a bunch of keyboards and a microphone, and the main room was for sleeping. We all just ended up crashing there and that grew into a roommate situation where all three of us shared an apartment.

Their first song was "Right Thurr", the overnight nationwide hit.

After our success with Chingy we started fishing around for a situation, a home to put out the rest of our groups. When it was all said and done we had had talks with EMI, Motown, Jive, and Universal. Barry Hankerson was instrumental in our talks, and we decided to sign with Blackground Records.

After securing a deal with Barry Hankerson's (R. Kelly, Toni Braxton, JoJo, Ginuwine and Aaliyah) Blackground Records, the Trak Starz hoped to develop local artists from their Trak Starz Productions roster

=== 2003–2004 ===
By the end of 2003, the Track Starz had earned production credits on Ludacris' multi-platinum Chicken-n-Beer (“Splash Waterfalls”) and Britney Spears' "Me Against the Music (The Trak Starz Remix)." They wrote and produced Houston's hit single "I Like That." They also earned a Diamond certification and a Grammy Award nomination for Album of the Year with their contributions on Usher's Confessions. Additional production credits would also include Chingy's Platinum certified Powerballin' and DreamWorks Shark Tale soundtrack.

=== Star Studded and side-projects ===
In 2005 the Trak Starz, now managed by Larry Rudolph (Britney Spears' manager) of ReignDeer Entertainment, announced the release of their debut album titled Star Studded. The album's guest list was extensive, including David Banner, Twista, Juvenile, Lil Jon, Timbaland, Chingy, Nate Dogg, Bun B. and Jon B. Recorded in their state-of-the art studio in St. Louis, The Trak Meet, the first official single titled "Take it Off," featured STL and T Deep, the first artists signed to the Trak Starz label. The album was never released.

The Trak Starz kept working on other projects for Nas, Ludacris, E-40, Chingy and Janet Jackson.

=== Release Therapy - present ===
In 2007 the Trak Starz earned a Grammy Award for their production on Ludacris' 2006 Release Therapy album. Their award for Best Rap Album was achieved for their production on "Do Your Time" featuring Beanie Sigel, C-Murder and the late Pimp C.

In addition, the Trak Starz produced the hit "Pop, Lock, and Drop It” for Jive Records/HiTz Committee recording artist Huey.

== Partial discography ==
=== Production credits ===
List of songs produced and/or co-produced, with other performing artists, showing year released and album name
Year	Song	Artist	Album	Notes
2003	"Jackpot Intro"	Chingy	Jackpot	N/A
2003	"He's Herre"	Chingy	Jackpot	N/A
2003	"Represent"	Chingy, Tity Boi, I-20	Jackpot	N/A
2003	"Right Thurr"	Chingy	Jackpot	N/A
2003	"Jackpot the Pimp"	Chingy	Jackpot	N/A
2003	"Wurrs My Cash"	Chingy	Jackpot	N/A
2003	"Chingy Jackpot"	Chingy	Jackpot	N/A
2003	"Sample Dat Ass"	Chingy, Murphy Lee	Jackpot	N/A
2003	"One Call Away"	Chingy, J-Weav	Jackpot	N/A
2003	"Dice Game"	Chingy	Jackpot	N/A
2003	"Gettin' It"	Chingy	2 Fast 2 Furious Soundtrack and Jackpot	N/A
2003	"Holidae In"	Chingy, Ludacris, Snoop Dogg	Jackpot	N/A
2003	"Juice"	Chingy	Jackpot	N/A
2003	"Fuck That Nigga"	Chingy	Jackpot	N/A
2003	"Madd at Me"	Chingy	Jackpot	N/A
2003	"Mob wit Me"	Chingy	Jackpot	N/A
2003	"That's Her"	Da Hol' 9	That Hella-Thurl Shit	N/A
2003	"Gangsta-Luv"	Da Hol' 9	That Hella-Thurl Shit	N/A
2003	"This Yo Song"	Da Hol' 9	That Hella-Thurl Shit	N/A
2003	"Im Kooool on That"	Da Hol' 9	That Hella-Thurl Shit	N/A
2004	"I Like That"	Houston, Chingy, Nate Dogg, I-20	It's Already Written	N/A
2004	"Gold Digger"	Ludacris, Bobby Valentino, Lil' Fate	Shark Tale: Motion Picture Soundtrack	N/A
2004	"Jackpot the Pimp (Part 2)"	Chingy	Powerballin'	N/A
2004	"Make That Ass Talk"	Chingy, Ziggy	Powerballin'	N/A
2004	"I Do"	Chingy	Powerballin'	N/A
2004	"Don't Worry"	Chingy, Janet Jackson	Powerballin'	N/A
2004	"We Clubbin'"	Chingy	Powerballin'	N/A
2004	"We Do"	Chingy, Bun B	Powerballin'	N/A
2004	"Wurr Da 'Git It' Gurlz At?"	Chingy, G.I.B.	Powerballin'	N/A
2004	"Bring da Beef"	Chingy, G.I.B.	Powerballin'	N/A
2005	"Professional"	Chingy, G.I.B.	Coach Carter: Music from the Motion Picture	N/A
2005	"Sweet Revenge"	Ludacris	Disturbing tha Peace	N/A
2005	"That's My Shit"	Ludacris, Field Mob, Playaz Circle, Perfect Harmany	Disturbing tha Peace	N/A
2006	"Bounce That"	Chingy	Hoodstar	N/A
2006	"How We Roll"	Chingy	Hoodstar	N/A
2006	"All We Do Is This"	Chingy	Hoodstar	N/A
2006	"Do Your Time"	Ludacris, Beanie Sigel, Pimp C, C-Murder	Release Therapy	N/A
2007	"Lean'n"	Ali & Gipp, Murphy Lee, Nelly	Kinfolk	N/A
2007	"All Night Excuse Me"	Ali & Gipp, Nelly, Avery Storm, Juvenile	Kinfolk	N/A
2008	"Ringtone"	Yung Ro	The Rising Son	N/A
2009	"DJ Know Me"	Playaz Circle, Young Dro	Flight 360: The Takeoff	co-prod. by Billionaire BoyScout

=== Remixes ===
List of songs remixed, with other performing artists, showing year released and album name
Year	Song	Artist	Album	Notes
2002	"Dirty & Stinkin'" (Remix)	Ol' Dirty Bastard, Insane Clown Posse	The Trials and Tribulations of Russell Jones	remixed w/ One Eye & Tytanic; prod. w/ One Eye
2003	"Right Thurr" (Remix)	Chingy, Jermaine Dupri, Trina	Jackpot	N/A
2003	"Lemmehollatcha" (Remix)	Da Hol' 9	That Hella-Thurl Shit	also prod.
2003	"Me Against the Music" (The Trak Starz Remix)	Britney Spears, Madonna	N/A	also add. prod.
2004	"Splash Waterfalls" (Whatever You Want Remix)	Ludacris, Raphael Saadiq	N/A	N/A
