= Balla Baby =

2004 single by Chingy

Single by Chingy

from the album Powerballin'
- B-side: "Fall-N"
- Released: September 14, 2004
- Length: 3:33
- Label: Slot-A-Lot; Capitol
- Songwriters: Chingy; Keith McMasters
- Producer: Keith McMasters

Chingy singles chronology
| "I Like That" (2004) | "Balla Baby" (2004) | "Don't Worry" (2005) |

Music video
- "Balla Baby" on YouTube

"Balla Baby" is a song by American rapper Chingy. It was released as the lead single from his second album, Powerballin' (2004). It garnered a mixed reception from critics, was the only single from the album to be released worldwide, and reached number 20 on the Billboard Hot 100 and number 34 on the UK Singles Chart. A music video by Jeremy Rall was made to promote the single that features Chingy inside a pinball machine that's named after the album's title. The remix features Lil Flip and Boozie of G.I.B. and a music video was made for the remix.

== Critical reception ==
"Balla Baby" received mixed reviews from music critics. Soren Baker of the Los Angeles Times called it a "solid braggadocio single." Billboard writer Rashaun Hall described the song's catchy hook delivered in Chingy's technical flow as an "affable attempt" made to bring attention to his sophomore effort Powerballin'. Paul Cantor of RapReviews commended the track's production but said that, "It's the borderline generic nature in which this whole record comes across that makes it less likely to pick up in the way the techno-inspired "Right Thurr" did." Reviewing the album for Rolling Stone, Jon Caramanica put it alongside "We Clubbin'" as examples that showcase Chingy's charm and unique delivery, but found them "amiable, but aimless."

== Commercial performance ==
"Balla Baby" debuted on the Billboard Hot 100 the week of October 9, 2004, at number 67. It moved eleven spots to number 56 the week of October 16, 2004. It then moved fifteen spots to number 41 the week of October 23, 2004. It reached the top 40 the week of October 30, 2004, by moving sixteen spots to number 25. It peaked at number 20 the week of November 13, 2004, and held that position for two weeks, remaining on the chart for eighteen weeks. It was the first single released by Chingy to not reach the top 5 in that chart after three consecutive hits off his Jackpot album.

== Music video ==
Directed by Jeremy Rall, the video features Chingy and scantily-clad women inside a pinball machine called "Powerballin'" (the album's title). Inside the machine, Chingy is going to a meeting with a record executive, stunting next to various luxury cars and women, inside a bank vault filled with money and playing at a casino with various people around him. A barn owl is occasionally featured in the video. The video ends with Chingy playing the machine while two women watch. The explicit remix version of the video was released afterwards.

== Track listings ==
US CD single

1. "Balla Baby" (album version)
2. "Balla Baby" (radio edit)
3. "Balla Baby" (instrumental)

US 12-inch single

A1. "Balla Baby" (radio edit)
A2. "Balla Baby" (instrumental)
A3. "Balla Baby" (album version)
B1. "Fall-N" (radio edit featuring Git It Boyz)
B2. "Fall-N" (instrumental featuring Git It Boyz)
B3. "Fall-N" (album version featuring Git It Boyz)

Australian CD single

1. "Balla Baby" (radio edit)
2. "Chingy Jackpot"
3. "That Thing" (featuring OG)

UK CD1

1. "Balla Baby" (album version) – 3:36
2. "That Thing" (featuring OG) – 3:48

UK CD2

1. "Balla Baby" (album version) – 3:36
2. "Fall-N" (album version featuring Git It Boyz) – 3:39
3. "Balla Baby" (instrumental) – 3:36
4. "Balla Baby" (video) – 3:39

UK 12-inch single

A1. "Balla Baby" (album version)
A2. "Balla Baby" (instrumental)
B1. "Fall-N" (radio edit featuring Git It Boyz)
B2. "Fall-N" (instrumental featuring Git It Boyz)
B3. "Fall-N" (album version featuring Git It Boyz)

== Charts ==
=== Weekly charts ===
| Chart (2004–2005) | Peak position |
|---|---|
| Australia (ARIA) | 19 |
| Australian Urban (ARIA) | 4 |
| Belgium (Ultratip Bubbling Under Flanders) | 9 |
| Belgium (Ultratip Bubbling Under Wallonia) | 15 |
| Canada (Nielsen SoundScan) | 6 |
| Germany (GfK) | 87 |
| Ireland (IRMA) | 30 |
| Italy (FIMI) | 29 |
| Netherlands (Dutch Top 40 Tipparade) | 2 |
| Netherlands (Single Top 100) | 33 |
| New Zealand (Recorded Music NZ) | 7 |
| Scotland Singles (OCC) | 52 |
| Switzerland (Schweizer Hitparade) | 30 |
| UK Singles (OCC) | 34 |
| UK Hip Hop/R&B (OCC) | 10 |
| US Billboard Hot 100 | 20 |
| US Hot R&B/Hip-Hop Songs (Billboard) | 17 |
| US Hot Rap Songs (Billboard) | 7 |
| US Pop Airplay (Billboard) | 23 |
| US Rhythmic Airplay (Billboard) | 8 |

=== Year-end charts ===
| Chart (2004) | Position |
|---|---|
| US Rhythmic Top 40 (Billboard) | 64 |

| Chart (2005) | Position |
|---|---|
| US Mainstream Top 40 (Billboard) | 92 |
| US Rhythmic Top 40 (Billboard) | 86 |

== Certifications ==
| Region | Certification | Certified units/sales |
|---|---|---|
| New Zealand (RMNZ) | Gold | 15,000^{‡} |
| United States (RIAA) | Gold | 500,000^{*} |
^{*} Sales figures based on certification alone.^{‡} Sales+streaming figures based on certification alone.

== Release history ==
| Region | Date | Format(s) | Label(s) | Ref. |
|---|---|---|---|---|
| United States | September 14, 2004 | Urban radio | Slot-A-Lot; Capitol | |
| United States | October 11, 2004 | Contemporary hit radio | Slot-A-Lot; Capitol | |
| United Kingdom | November 1, 2004 | CD | Slot-A-Lot; Capitol | |
