= Jeremy Rall =

American film director

- Born: Bay City, Michigan, United States
- Occupations: Film director, music video director, photographer
- Website: www.jeremyrall.com

Jeremy Rall is an American music video director, photographer and independent film director.

== Early life and career ==
Born in Bay City, Michigan and raised in Lansing, Rall attended J.W. Sexton High School, graduating in 1991.

== Videography ==
=== 1999 ===
- Heather B. — "Do You"
- Philly's Most Wanted — "Suckas"

=== 2000 ===
- Drama — "Left, Right, Left"
- Drama — "Double Time (Drama's Cadence)"
- Field Mob — "Project Dreams"
- Bad Azz featuring Snoop Dogg and Kokane — "Wrong Idea"
- Sammie featuring Lil' Bow Wow — "Crazy Things I Do" [Remix]
- Ludacris featuring Shawnna — "What's Your Fantasy"
- DJ Clue? featuring Beanie Sigel — "In the Club"

=== 2001 ===
- Ludacris — "Southern Hospitality"
- Tank — "Maybe I Deserve"
- Philly's Most Wanted — "Cross the Border"
- Philly's Most Wanted — "Please Don't Mind"
- Snoop Dogg featuring Soopafly and Butch Cassidy — "Loosen' Control"
- Lil' O featuring Big Hawk — "Back Back"
- Dante Thomas — "Fly"
- Ludacris — "Rollout (My Business)"
- Rell — "If That's My Baby"

=== 2002 ===
- Jim Crow featuring Sean P — "Holla at a Playa"
- Field Mob — "Sick of Being Lonely"
- Talib Kweli featuring Bilal — "Waitin' for the DJ"
- Big Moe — "Purple Stuff"
- Heather B. — "Live MC"
- Beenie Man featuring Sean Paul and Lady Saw — "Bossman"

=== 2003 ===
- Floetry — "Say Yes"
- Chingy featuring Jermaine Dupri and Trina — "Right Thurr" [Remix]
- Chingy featuring Ludacris and Snoop Dogg — "Holidae In"

=== 2004 ===
- Houston featuring Chingy, Nate Dogg and I-20 — "I Like That"
- Chingy — "Balla Baby"

=== 2007 ===
- Kelly Rowland featuring Travis McCoy — "Daylight"

=== 2010 ===
- T-Pain — "Reverse Cowgirl"
- R. Kelly — "When a Woman Loves" (co-director with R. Kelly)

=== 2011 ===
- R. Kelly — "Radio Message"

=== 2012 ===
- Chris Rene — "Young Homie"

=== 2013 ===
- All Time Low — "Backseat Serenade"
- Amplify Dot featuring Busta Rhymes — "I'm Good"
