= Keshia Knight Pulliam =

American actress (born 1979)

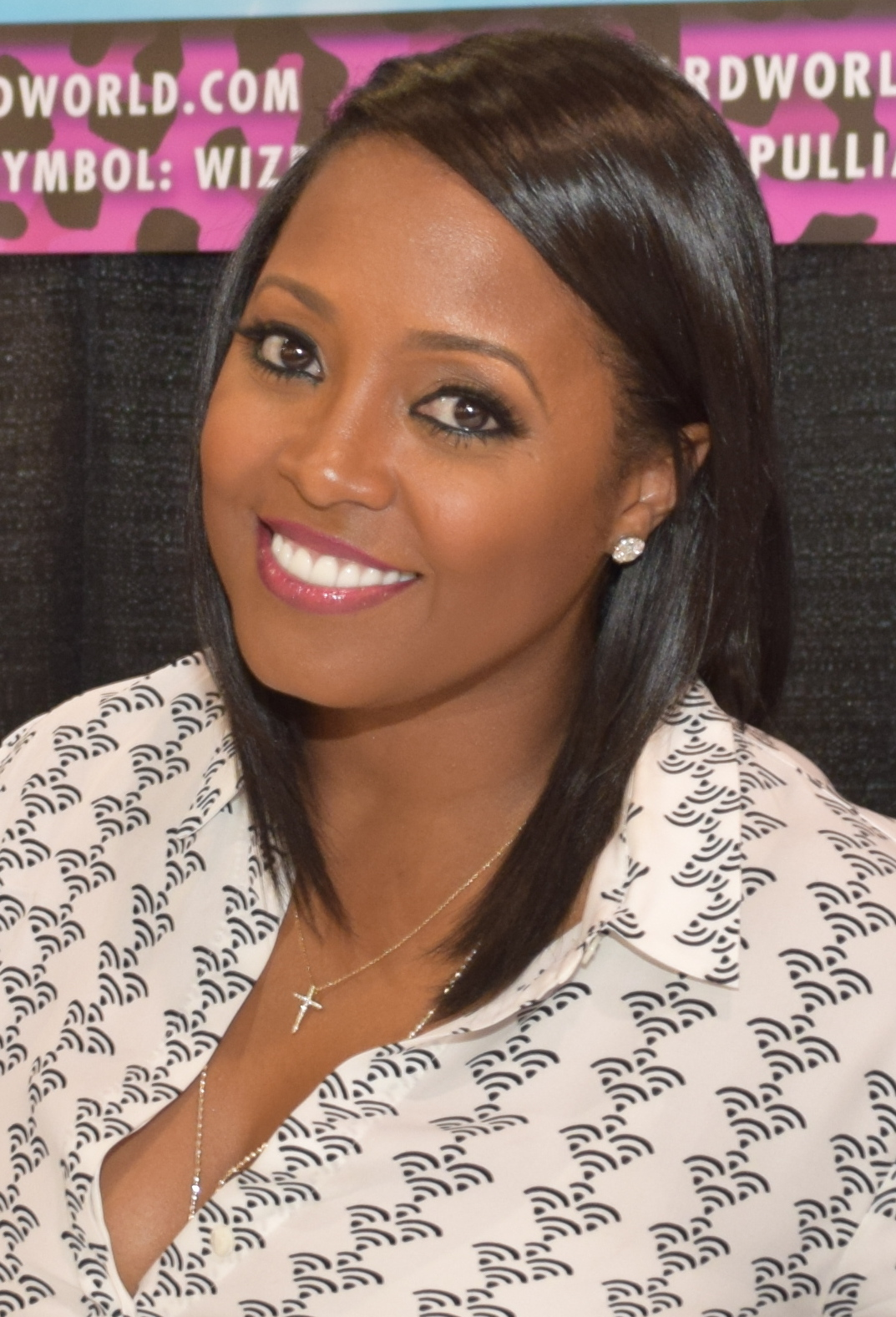
- Knight Pulliam at the Wizard World Comic Con in 2015
- Born: April 9, 1979 (age 47); Newark, New Jersey, U.S.
- Education: Spelman College
- Occupation: Actress
- Years active: 1980–present
- Known for: Rudy Huxtable in The Cosby Show
- Spouses: Ed Hartwell (m. 2016; div. 2018) Brad James (m. 2021)
- Children: 2
- Website: keshiaknightpulliam.me

Keshia Knight Pulliam (born April 9, 1979) is an American actress. She began her career as a child actress. She landed her breakthrough role as Rudy Huxtable, on the NBC sitcom The Cosby Show (1984–1992), and became the youngest person to be nominated for an Emmy Award, when she earned a nomination for Outstanding Supporting Actress in A Comedy Series at the 38th Primetime Emmy Awards. She later reprised the character on the spin-off series A Different World (1987–88). Knight Pulliam is also known for her portrayal of Miranda Lucas-Payne on the TBS comedy drama series Tyler Perry's House of Payne (2007–present) and films such as Polly (1989), Beauty Shop (2005) and Madea Goes to Jail (2009).

== Career ==
Knight Pulliam made her professional debut at 9 months old, in a national print advertisement for Johnson & Johnson baby products. At age 3, she appeared on Sesame Street. In 1984, she was cast as Rudy Huxtable on the NBC sitcom The Cosby Show, a role she played until the series ended in 1992. In 1986, Knight Pulliam became one of the youngest actresses to be nominated for an Emmy Award, receiving a nomination at age 6 for Outstanding Supporting Actress in A Comedy Series. She continued working, appearing in television commercials and TV shows, and making her feature film debut in The Last Dragon (1985). She also appeared in the movies Polly and its sequel Polly: Comin' Home! with her Cosby Show co-star Phylicia Rashad. She is ranked at No. 27 in VH1's list of the "100 Greatest Kid Stars".

Knight Pulliam won a celebrity version of Fear Factor in September 2002. She also won a celebrity version of The Weakest Link, and participated in Celebrity Mole: Yucatan. In 2004, she appeared in Chingy's music video for "One Call Away". In 2005, she played Darnelle in Beauty Shop with Queen Latifah. Knight Pulliam performed in Donald Gray's play The Man of Her Dreams in the fall of 2006 in St. Louis. In 2008, she joined the cast of Tyler Perry's House of Payne as Miranda, the new wife of Calvin Payne. The role earned her the 2009 and 2010 NAACP Image Awards for Outstanding Supporting Actress in a Comedy Series. In 2009, she played Candace "Candy" Washington-Collins in the film Madea Goes to Jail. Knight Pulliam appeared in Tank's 2010 music video for his cover of "I Can't Make You Love Me", playing his love interest.

In 2011, commenting on the fact that only white actors had won Golden Globe Awards that year, she said: "I think that there is definitely work to be done. It can always be more diverse. We live in a very multicultural and global society. More needs to be done to increase the representation of all people and really show the world for what it is. It’s not just one color."

In 2013, she was a contestant on the ABC celebrity diving show Splash. She was first to be eliminated. In 2015, Knight Pulliam was a contestant on the NBC show The Celebrity Apprentice Season 7 and was the first contestant eliminated after being the losing project manager for her team. In 2018, Knight Pulliam was a HouseGuest on the first season of the CBS series Celebrity Big Brother, where she was the second person evicted out of the house, on Day 13.

In 2026, Knight Pulliam competed in the HGTV series Totally 90s House while being partnered with fellow actors, Matthew Lawrence and Melissa Joan Hart.

== Personal life ==
Keshia Knight Pulliam was born in Newark, New Jersey on April 9, 1979, the daughter of Denise and James Knight Pulliam Sr., a manager. She has three brothers, James Knight Pulliam II, Mshon Knight Pulliam, and Juwan Pulliam. Knight Pulliam attended Rutgers Preparatory School in Somerset, New Jersey.

When The Cosby Show ended its run in 1992, her family moved to Virginia, where Knight Pulliam attended the Potomac School in McLean and Foxcroft School in Middleburg, Virginia, from which she graduated in 1997. She earned a Bachelor of Arts in Sociology from Spelman College in 2001. She is a member of the Eta Kappa chapter of Delta Sigma Theta sorority.

On December 31, 2015, Knight Pulliam became engaged to retired National Football League player Edgerton Hartwell. They were married the next day, January 1, 2016, in Knight Pulliam's Atlanta home. On July 25, 2016, Hartwell filed for divorce. On January 23, 2017, Knight Pulliam gave birth to a daughter named Ella Grace Hartwell. The divorce was finalized in April 2018, with Knight Pulliam receiving primary custody of Ella while Hartwell was ordered to pay child support of about $3,000 a month.

In December 2020, she became engaged to actor Brad James. They began dating in 2019 after they met on the set of the television movie Pride and Prejudice: Atlanta. They were married in an intimate ceremony in September 2021. In December 2022, it was announced Knight Pulliam was pregnant with her second child and her first with James. On April 4, 2023, she gave birth to a son named Knight James.

== Filmography ==
=== Film ===
| Year | Title | Role | Notes |
|---|---|---|---|
| 1985 | The Last Dragon | Sophia/Natasha Green | |
| 1985 | Back to Next Saturday | Rudy Huxtable | TV movie |
| 1987 | The Little Match Girl | Molly | TV movie |
| 1989 | Polly | Polly | TV movie |
| 1989 | A Connecticut Yankee in King Arthur's Court | Karen | TV movie |
| 1990 | Polly: Comin' Home! | Polly | TV movie |
| 2002 | What About Your Friends: Weekend Getaway | Temple | TV movie |
| 2004 | Motives | Letrice | Video |
| 2004 | Christmas at Water's Edge | Leila Turner | TV movie |
| 2005 | Beauty Shop | Darnelle | |
| 2005 | The Gospel | Maya Walker | |
| 2008 | Cuttin Da Mustard | Wendy | |
| 2008 | Death Toll | Mirie | |
| 2009 | Madea Goes to Jail | Candace Washington | |
| 2013 | The Love Letter | Parker | TV movie |
| 2015 | Will to Love | Rachel Paris | TV movie |
| 2018 | Jingle Belle | Tori | TV movie |
| 2019 | Pride and Prejudice: Atlanta | Caroline | TV movie |
| 2019 | Radio Christmas | Kara Porter | TV movie |
| 2020 | My Brother's Keeper | Tiffany | |
| 2020 | Tempted By Danger | Angela Brooks | TV movie |
| 2020 | The Christmas Aunt | Rebecca | TV movie |
| 2021 | Redeemed | Angela Sylvester | |
| 2022 | A New Orleans Noel | Grace Hill | TV movie |
| 2023 | The Hillsdale Adoption Scam | Bethany | TV movie |
| 2025 | Wife Stalker | Joanna | Lifetime movie |

=== Television ===
| Year | Title | Role | Notes |
|---|---|---|---|
| 1983–88 | Sesame Street | Herself | Recurring Guest |
| 1984–92 | The Cosby Show | Rudy Huxtable | Main Cast |
| 1987–88 | A Different World | Rudy Huxtable | Recurring Cast: Season 1 |
| 1990 | Reading Rainbow | Herself (voice) | Episode: "The Magic School Bus Inside the Earth" |
| 1993 | It's Showtime at the Apollo | Herself/Guest Host | Episode: "Episode #6.17" |
| 1997 | Cosby | Guitarist | Episode: "The Return of Charlites" |
| 2001 | The Weakest Link | Herself | Episode: "TV Child Stars Edition" |
| 2002 | Fear Factor | Herself | Episode: "Celebrity Fear Factor 3" |
| 2004 | The Mole | Herself/Contestant | Contestant: Season 4 |
| 2005 | The Greatest | Herself | Episode: "100 Greatest Kid Stars" |
| 2007–09 | Whatever Happened To? | Herself | Episode: "Little Sisters" & "Middle Sibbles" |
| 2007–12, 2020– present | Tyler Perry's House of Payne | Miranda Lucas Payne | Main Cast |
| 2009 | Played by Fame | Herself | Episode: "Eco Friend Date" |
| 2010 | Psych | Stranjay | Episode: "The Polarizing Express" |
| 2011 | Celebrity Ghost Stories | Herself | Episode: "Keshia Knight Pulliam, Ming-Na, Chi McBride, Mia Tyler" |
| 2011 | Hollywood Icons and Innovators | Herself | Episode: "Episode #1.3" |
| 2012 | The Real Housewives of Atlanta | Herself | Episode: "All Pomp But No Circumstance" |
| 2012 | Mr. Box Office | Vanessa Owens | Episode: "Pilot" |
| 2013 | Splash | Herself/Contestant | Main Cast |
| 2013 | Guys with Kids | Bridget | Episode: "Divorce Party" |
| 2015 | The Apprentice | Herself/Contestant | Contestant: Season 14 |
| 2018 | Celebrity Big Brother | Herself/Contestant | Contestant: Season 1 |
| 2019 | BET Her Presents: The Waiting Room | Dr. Bennett | Episode: "The Waiting Room" |
| 2021 | Down to Business | Herself | Episode: "Various Artists" |
| 2022 | Uncensored | Herself | Episode: "Keshia Knight Pulliam" |
| 2022 | Married at First Sight | Herself/Host | Main Host: Season 15 |
| 2026 | Totally 90s House | Herself/Contestant | |

=== Music videos ===
| Year | Title | Artist |
|---|---|---|
| 2004 | " One Call Away" | Chingy featuring J-Weav |
| 2007 | " Please Don't Go" | Tank |
| 2010 | "I Can't Make You Love Me" | Tank |

== Awards and nominations ==
- 1986: Emmy Awards Outstanding Supporting Actress in A Comedy Series (nominated) The Cosby Show
- 2009: NAACP Image Awards Best Supporting Actress in the Comedy Series (won) Tyler Perry's House of Payne
- 2010: NAACP Image Awards Best Supporting Actress in the Comedy Series (won) Tyler Perry's House of Payne
- 2011: NAACP Image Awards Best Supporting Actress in the Comedy Series (nominated) Tyler Perry's House of Payne
- 2012: NAACP Image Awards Best Supporting Actress in the Comedy Series (won) Tyler Perry's House of Payne
