= It's Already Written =

2004 studio album by Houston

Studio album by Houston
- Released: August 10, 2004
- Length: 50:51
- Label: Capitol
- Producer: Ben Daka; Blaze Da Track; Burton Paul; Jazze Pha; Michael Angelo Saulsberry; Mischke; Ralph B. Stacy; Roy "Royalty" Hamilton; Soulshock and Karlin; The Trak Starz; The Underdogs

Singles from It's Already Written
- 1. "I Like That" Released: 2004; 2. "Ain't Nothing Wrong" Released: 2004

It's Already Written is the only studio album by American contemporary R&B singer Houston. It was released by Capitol Records on August 10, 2004, in the United States. Production was handled by Ralph B. Stacy, Roy "Royalty" Hamilton, Ben Daka, Blaze Da Track, Burton Paul, Jazze Pha, Michael Angelo Saulsberry, Mischke Butler, Soulshock and Karlin, The Trak Starz and The Underdogs. It's Already Written features guest appearances from Chingy, Don Yute, I-20, Jazze Pha, LeToya and Nate Dogg.

The album peaked at number 14 on the US Billboard 200 and also reached number 8 on the Top R&B/Hip-Hop Albums chart. It was eventually certified Gold by the Recording Industry Association of America (RIAA) on September 21, 2004. The album spawned two singles and music videos for "I Like That" and "Ain't Nothing Wrong," the former of which became a top five hit in New Zealand and Switzerland and peaked at number 11 on both the UK Singles Chart and US Billboard Hot 100.

== Critical reception ==
Professional ratings
Review scores
| Source | Rating |
|---|---|
| AllMusic | 3/5 stars |
| Blender | 2/5 stars |

AllMusic editor David Jeffries found that "it's doubtful that the title is intentionally ironic, but with the usual combination of slow jams, interludes, and club tracks, It's Already Written does sound like it could have been written for anybody [...] A little more personality next time would be beneficial, but for now Houston's just a great singer with a killer single and a handful of decent tracks."

== Track listing ==
It's Already Written track listing
| No. | Title | Writer(s) | Producer(s) | Length |
|---|---|---|---|---|
| 1. | "It's Already Written Part I" | Houston Summers; Roy Hamilton | Hamilton | 0:50 |
| 2. | "I Like That" (featuring Chingy, Nate Dogg and I-20) | Summers; Alonzo Lee; Shamar Daugherty; Mischke Butler; Howie Bailey; Nathaniel Hale; Bobby Sandimanie | The Trak Starz | 3:56 |
| 3. | "Twizala (Intro)" | Summers; Reno Rankin; Hamilton | Hamilton | 0:59 |
| 4. | "Twizala" | Summers; Larry Woodson; Hamilton; Steve Prudholme | Hamilton | 3:38 |
| 5. | "Ain't Nothing Wrong" | Antonio Dixon; Damon Thomas; Eric Dawkins; Harvey Mason, Jr.; Kenneth Edmonds | Thomas; Mason | 4:08 |
| 6. | "My Promise" (featuring LeToya) | John Harris; Lou Bond; Hamilton; Shakia Royal | Hamilton | 3:59 |
| 7. | "Keep It on the Low" (featuring Don Yute) | Summers; Alex Cantrall; Kenneth Karlin; Marko Glogolja; Phillip "Silky" White; Carsten Schack | Soulshock & Karlin | 3:59 |
| 8. | "What You Say" | Michaelangelo Saulsberry; Mischke Butler; Nate Butler | Saulsberry; Butler | 4:16 |
| 9. | "Love You Down" | Melvin C. Riley | Thomas; Mason | 4:28 |
| 10. | "Alright" (featuring Jazze Pha) | Summers; Pha; Johnta Austin; Kevin Hicks | Pha; Hicks | 4:27 |
| 11. | "Bye Bye Love" | Summers; Emanuel Officer; Ralph B. Stacy | Stacy | 3:37 |
| 12. | "Didn't Give a Damn" (Interlude) | Stacy; Rankin | Stacy | 0:58 |
| 13. | "Didn't Give a Damn" | Summers; Stacy; Dennis Bettis | Stacy | 4:21 |
| 14. | "She Is" | Summers; Kyle Hudnall | Blaze da Track | 3:34 |
| 15. | "It's Already Written Part II (Thunder)" | Summers | Burton Paul; Ben Daka | 1:09 |

Japanese bonus tracks
| No. | Title | Writer(s) | Producer(s) | Length |
|---|---|---|---|---|
| 16. | "I Like That" (Chris Cox Remix) | Summers; Lee; Daugherty; M. Butler; Bailey; Hale; Sandimanie | The Trak Starz; Chris Cox^{[a]} | 3:54 |
| 17. | "Ain't Nothing Wrong" (Full Phatt Remix) | Dixon; Thomas; Dawkins; Mason; Edmonds | Thomas; Mason; Full Phat^{[a]} | 3:41 |
| 18. | "Ain't Nothing Wrong" (G4orce Garage Extended Mix) | Dixon; Thomas; Dawkins; Mason; Edmonds | Thomas; Mason; G4orce^{[a]} | 4:35 |
| 19. | "I Like That" (music video) | | | 4:15 |
| 20. | "Ain't Nothing Wrong" (music video) | | | 3:25 |
| 21. | "Documentary" (video) | | | 4:29 |

Notes

- ^{^[a]} denotes remix producer(s)

== Charts ==
Weekly chart performance for It's Already Written
| Chart (2004) | Peak position |
|---|---|
| French Albums (SNEP) | 83 |
| German Albums (Offizielle Top 100) | 77 |
| Swiss Albums (Schweizer Hitparade) | 50 |
| US Billboard 200 | 14 |
| US Top R&B/Hip-Hop Albums (Billboard) | 8 |

== Certifications ==
Sales and certifications for It's Already Written
| Region | Certification | Certified units/sales |
|---|---|---|
| United States (RIAA) | Gold | 500,000^{^} |
^{^} Shipments figures based on certification alone.
