= Dem Jeans =

Single by Chingy featuring Jermaine Dupri

from the album Hoodstar
- Released: August 22, 2006
- Recorded: 2006
- Genre: Dirty rap
- Length: 3:51
- Label: Slot-A-Lot; Capitol
- Songwriters: Howard Bailey; Jermaine Mauldin; James Phillips
- Producer: Jermaine Dupri

Chingy singles chronology
"Pullin' Me Back" (2006)	"Dem Jeans" (2006)	"Fly Like Me" (2007)

Jermaine Dupri singles chronology
"Fresh Azimiz" (2005)	"Dem Jeans" (2006)	"I'm Throwed" (2007)

"Dem Jeans" is a song by American rapper Chingy. It was released as the second and final single off his third album Hoodstar (2006). The song is produced by and features rapper Jermaine Dupri. The song peaked at number 59 on the Billboard Hot 100, his first single to not reach the top 40 on that chart. It did better on the Hot Rap Songs and Hot R&B/Hip-Hop Songs charts respectively. Bun B and David Banner made cameo appearances in the promotional video. "Dem Jeans" was heard on the 100th episode of "CSI: Miami," the fourth episode of the fourth season of "The O.C." and in the 2007 film Norbit.

== Commercial performance ==
On the week of October 7, 2006, "Dem Jeans" debuted at number 96 on the Billboard Hot R&B/Hip-Hop Songs chart. Three weeks later, it peaked at number 57, and stayed on the chart for sixteen weeks. The song also debuted at number 24 on the Billboard Hot Rap Songs chart the week of October 21. It peaked at number 19 the week of December 9, and spent a total of twelve weeks on the chart. On the Hot 100 the week of November 18, it debuted at number 93. It peaked at number 59 the week of December 9, staying on the chart for nine weeks. It was Chingy's first single to not reach the top 40 on that chart.

For the week of January 28, 2007, the track debuted and peaked at number 85 on the UK Singles Chart.

== Charts ==
Chart (2006)	Peak Position
Australia (ARIA)	58
Australian Urban (ARIA)	14
Scottish Singles Sales (Official Charts)	67
UK Singles (Official Charts)	85
US Billboard Hot 100	59
US Hot R&B/Hip-Hop Songs (Billboard)	57
US Hot Rap Songs (Billboard)	19
US Pop 100 (Billboard)	62
US Rhythmic Airplay (Billboard)	16

== Release history ==
Release dates and formats for "High School Never Ends"
Region	Date	Format	Label(s)	Ref.
United States	September 26, 2006	Rhythmic contemporary radio	Capitol	
United States	November 6, 2006	Contemporary hit radio	Capitol	
