= Hoodstar =

Studio album by Chingy
- Released: September 19, 2006
- Recorded: 2005–2006
- Genre: Hip-hop
- Length: 51:27
- Label: Capitol
- Producer: Jermaine Dupri; Mr. Collipark; Mannie Fresh; The Trak Starz; Timbaland; DJ Paul; Juicy J; Pauly Paul

Chingy chronology
Powerballin' (2004)	Hoodstar (2006)	Hate It or Love It (2007)

Singles from Hoodstar
- 1. "Pullin' Me Back" Released: July 21, 2006; 2. "Dem Jeans" Released: August 8, 2006

Hoodstar is the third studio album by the hip-hop artist Chingy, following the release of Powerballin'. Released on September 19, 2006, the disc is split into two sides with different musical styles. While the "Hood" segment has the tracks "Hands Up" and "Cadillac Door", "Star" has more uptempo and club-oriented tracks like "Brand New Kicks" and "Dem Jeans". The guest features are by Three 6 Mafia, Chopper and Chingy's cousin Young Spiffy. The album was produced by Jermaine Dupri, Timbaland, the Trak Starz, Mannie Fresh, Mr. Collipark and the dance group Hoodstarz, among others. The album entered the Billboard 200 at number 9 with first week sales of 77,000 copies in the US. It was certified Gold by RIAA for shipping over 500,000 copies in the US.

== Singles ==
The first official single was "Pullin' Me Back", featuring the R&B singer/actor Tyrese. The second single was "Dem Jeans", featuring Jermaine Dupri.

== Critical reception ==
Professional ratings
Aggregate scores
Source	Rating
Metacritic	41/100
Review scores
Source	Rating
AllMusic	2/5 stars
Blender	2.5/5 stars
Entertainment Weekly	C−
Los Angeles Times	2/4 stars
PopMatters	2/10 stars
RapReviews	7/10
Rolling Stone	1.5/5 stars
Spin	6/10
Vibe	0.5/5 marks
XXL	M

Hoodstar garnered mixed reviews from music critics. On Metacritic, which assigns a normalized rating out of 100 to reviews from mainstream critics, the album received an average score of 41, based on 11 reviews.

Steve 'Flash' Juon of RapReviews commended the production and featured guests for providing appeal for Chingy, despite an overreliance on his St. Louis accented gimmick to overcompensate for his lack of charisma, concluding that "You can call it silly if you like, but you can't say that Chingy hasn't found a niche and laid fucking DEEP in its cut. As such I suspect Hoodstar will be another successful album for the man with pennies in his name, regardless of critical acclaim. He'll keep on reppin' St. Louis to the death and you can't fault him for that." Thomas Golianopoulos of Spin said of the record, "Despite Chingy’s love for sneakers, freaky girls, and packed dance floors, the most memorable songs on his third album are decidedly buzz killers: "Pullin' Me Back" is a gloomy breaking-up-is- hard-to-do anthem crafted by superproducer Jermaine Dupri, and on the surprisingly candid "Cadillac Door," the St. Louis rapper laments lost friends. Of course, sandwiched between the two is the more familiar "Dem Jeans," an ode to, yup, women in tight jeans." Julianne Shepherd of Vibe wrote that: "Occasionally, his drawled vernacular and sleepily melodic flow can compensate for his lack of thematic range (the holy trinity of kicks, chicks, chains), but generally, Chingy is blank, as flat as tap water."

Jon Caramanica, reviewing for Blender, found the album inconsistent throughout its track listing and caused Chingy to run out of steam musically, concluding that, "At his best, Chingy raps in a whimsical tone that becomes a melodic element in its own right, and he delivers the odd sharp pick-up line: "I bet you had to jump up and down just to put 'em on," he leers on "Dem Jeans." But mostly he just sounds bored, a pretty boy tired of being denied his inner turmoil." Clover Hope of Billboard said that despite some early cuts and "a few catchy club tracks," she criticized Chingy for remaining in his "stale comfort zone" and delivering basic lyricism, calling Hoodstar "a middle-of-the-road rap record." Michael Harris of XXL criticized the record for its continued use of the typical hip-hop formula and Chingy's persona for delivering generic party tracks, concluding that "Although Chingy isn't ready to cash out just yet, Hoodstar, is another losing hand." Hua Hsu of Rolling Stone found the album to be more of the same from Chingy's previous efforts but found him being overshadowed by the guest artists instead of being on the same level.

== Track listing ==
Hood Side
No.	Title	Writer(s)	Producer(s)	Length
1.	"Intro (Rid'in Wit Me)"	Howard Bailey; Matthew McAllister	Matthew "Vudu" McAllister	1:46
2.	"Hands Up"	H. Bailey; Paul Poli	Poli Paul	4:38
3.	"Club Gettin' Crowded" (featuring Three 6 Mafia)	H. Bailey; Jordan Houston; Paul Beauregard	Juicy J; DJ Paul	4:35
4.	"Nike Aurr's & Crispy Tee's"	H. Bailey; P. Poli	Poli Paul	3:46
5.	"Bounce That"	H. Bailey; Shamar Daugherty; Alonzo Lee	The Trak Starz	3:53
6.	"Cadillac Door" (featuring Midwest City)	H. Bailey; P. Poli; Jeff Jones	Poli Paul	3:40

Star Side
No.	Title	Writer(s)	Producer(s)	Length
7.	"Dem Jeans" (featuring Jermaine Dupri)	Jermaine Dupri; H. Bailey	Jermaine Dupri; LRoc (co.)	3:49
8.	"Pullin' Me Back" (featuring Tyrese)	J. Dupri; James Phillips; H. Bailey; Brian Morgan; John Pastorius	Jermaine Dupri; LRoc (co.)	3:54
9.	"U a Freak (Nasty Girl)" (featuring Mr. Collipark and Kanary Diamonds)	H. Bailey; Michael Crooms; James Harris; Terry Lewis	Mr. Collipark	4:07
10.	"Brand New Kicks" (featuring Mannie Fresh)	H. Bailey; Byron Thomas	Mannie Fresh	4:31
11.	"Ass N Da Aurr" (featuring Young Spiffy)	H. Bailey; Marquinarius Holmes; Jeffrey Bailey Jr.	Sanchez	4:05
12.	"Let Me Luv U" (featuring Keri Hilson)	H. Bailey; Timothy Mosley	Timbaland	4:55
13.	"Let's Ride" (featuring Fatman Scoop)	Kwamé Holland; Darius Jones; H. Bailey	Kwamé	3:48

Japan bonus tracks
No.	Title	Writer(s)	Producer(s)	Length
14.	"How We Roll" (featuring Chopper Young City)	H. Bailey; S. Daugherty; A. Lee; Kevin Barnes	The Trak Starz	3:58
15.	"All We Do Is This"	H. Bailey; S. Daugherty; A. Lee	The Trak Starz	4:08

Sample credits

- "Pullin' Me Back" contains excerpts from the composition "Rain", written by Brian Morgan and John Pastorius.
- "U a Freak (Nasty Girl)" contains interpolations from "Nasty", written by James Harris and Terry Lewis.

== Charts ==
=== Weekly charts ===
Weekly chart performance for Hoodstar
Chart (2006)	Peak position
Canadian Albums (Nielsen SoundScan)	40
French Albums (SNEP)	195
Japanese Albums (Oricon)	17
New Zealand Albums (RMNZ)	39
US Billboard 200	9
US Top R&B/Hip-Hop Albums (Billboard)	3

=== Year-end charts ===
Year-end chart performance for Hoodstar
Chart (2006)	Position
US Top R&B/Hip-Hop Albums (Billboard)	93

== Certifications ==
Certifications for Hoodstar
Region	Certification	Certified units/sales
United States (RIAA)	Gold	500,000^{^}
^{^} Shipments figures based on certification alone.
