= Success & Failure =

Studio album by Chingy
- Released: September 7, 2010
- Recorded: 2009–2010
- Genre: Hip-hop
- Length: 41:40
- Label: Real Talk Entertainment

Chingy chronology
Hate It or Love It (2007)	Success & Failure (2010)

Singles from Success & Failure
- 1. "Iced Out" Released: May 11, 2010; 2. "Anythang" Released: June 1, 2010

Success & Failure is the fifth studio album by rapper Chingy, it was released on September 7, 2010. The project was available on ITunes, Amazon Music, Google Play Music.

== Track listing ==
Success & Failure track listing
No.	Title	Length
1.	"The Haters"	1:04
2.	"Iced Out" (featuring 8Ball)	3:15
3.	"Thurr Dey Go"	3:39
4.	"Ya Hear Me"	0:55
5.	"Git It Boy"	4:09
6.	"All I Know"	3:58
7.	"Drop a Dime"	0:43
8.	"Feelin Like a Million"	3:25
9.	"Anythang" (featuring Lil' Flip)	3:45
10.	"Money Brought Me Back"	4:32
11.	"Diamonds"	3:53
12.	"Set It Out"	3:15
13.	"Take Me"	4:03
14.	"How It Goes"	1:04

== Charts ==
Chart performance for Success & Failure
Chart (2010)	Peak position
US Top R&B/Hip-Hop Albums (Billboard)	84
