= Powerballin' =

Studio album by Chingy
- Released: November 16, 2004
- Recorded: 2003–2004
- Genre: Hip-hop
- Length: 56:13
- Labels: Slot-A-Lot; Capitol
- Producer: The Trak Starz

Chingy chronology
Jackpot (2003)	Powerballin' (2004)	Hoodstar (2006)

Singles from Powerballin'
- 1. "Balla Baby" Released: September 14, 2004; 2. "Don't Worry" Released: January 3, 2005

Powerballin' is the second studio album by the rapper Chingy, released on November 16, 2004, through Capitol Records and Chingy's Slot-A-Lot label. The album entered the Billboard 200 at number 172 with first week sales of 7,000 copies in the US, but then climbed to number 10 with another 120,000 copies sold in the following week. It has since been certified Platinum by the RIAA for shipping over a million copies in the US. The song "I Do" was used in the video game Need for Speed: Underground 2.

== Critical reception ==
Professional ratings
Aggregate scores
Source	Rating
Metacritic	59/100
Review scores
Source	Rating
AllMusic	2/5 stars
Billboard	(mixed)
Blender	4/5 stars
E! Online	B−
Entertainment Weekly	B
Los Angeles Times	3/4 stars
RapReviews	6/10
Rolling Stone	2/5 stars
USA Today	2.5/4 stars
Vibe	3/5 stars

Powerballin' received mixed reviews from music critics who noted at Chingy's attempt to replicate the success he had with Jackpot. At Metacritic, which assigns a normalized rating out of 100 to reviews from mainstream critics, the album received an average score of 59, based on 9 reviews.

Toshitaka Kondo of Vibe said that despite the middling lyrical content, he commended the instrumental flourishes and contributions of the featured artists found throughout the record, concluding with, "When it's all on the table, Powerballin' is more solid than spectacular, but either way, Chingy proves he's a safe bet." Steve Jones of USA Today found the guest artists on the album helpful in recreating Chingy's Jackpot formula, highlighting R. Kelly and Janet Jackson's contributions as stand outs, concluding that "he's found just the ticket for staying in the rotation at radio." Soren Baker, writing for the Los Angeles Times, praised the production for being energetic and Chingy's lyrical content showing creativity and technical ability, saying that he "improves on and refines his successful sonic and thematic formula in an album more consistent and satisfying than its predecessor."

Billboard contributor Rashaun Hall said that despite more R&B-flavored tracks like "Leave wit Me" and "Don't Worry" showing more diversity in the track listing, he found too much familiarity with the album's content of excessive parties, women and luxury talk. AllMusic writer Andy Kellman noted how the record sounds like a rushed version of Jackpot, criticizing the lyrical content and its hooks for being mediocre, and the lacklustre delivery of the guest artists, concluding that "In Chingy's case, a subpar 2004 follow-up would surely fare better commercially than a polished 2006 follow-up." Writing for Rolling Stone, Jon Caramanica also found the album doing little to be different from its predecessor, despite Chingy's charisma delivering on half of the track listing, concluding that "Powerballin' serves as a wink behind which there's nothing hidden. It's just a wink, ma."

== Track listing ==
No.	Title	Writer(s)	Producer(s)	Length
1.	"Haters 101 (Intro)"			2:19
2.	"Give 'Em Some Mo"	Howard Bailey; Derryl Howard; Maurice Wilson	Da Beatstaz	3:07
3.	"Fall-N" (featuring G.I.B.)	Bailey; Howard; Wilson; Carl Bowers; Kai Simms	Da Beatstaz	3:37
4.	"Balla Baby"	Bailey; Keith McMasters	Lil' Mack	3:33
5.	"Jackpot the Pimp (Part 2) (Skit)"			0:54
6.	"Leave wit Me" (featuring R. Kelly)	Bailey; Matthew "Vudu" McAllister; Robert Kelly	Vudu	3:57
7.	"Make That Ass Talk" (featuring Ziggy)	Bailey; Alonzo Lee; Shamar Daugherty	The Trak Starz	3:50
8.	"I Do"	Bailey; Lee; Daugherty	The Trak Starz	3:58
9.	"Don't Worry" (featuring Janet Jackson)	Bailey; Lee; Daugherty; Raphael Saadiq	The Trak Starz	4:25
10.	"All the Way to St. Lou" (featuring David Banner & Nate Dogg)	Bailey; David Banner; Nathaniel Hale; Headley Bennett; Huford Brown; Lloyd Ferguson; Robbie Lyn; Jackie Mittoo; Leroy Sibbles; Fitzroy Simpson	David Banner	4:03
11.	"26's" (featuring Lil Wayne)	Bailey; Howard; Wilson; Dwayne Carter	Da Beatstaz	4:25
12.	"We Clubbin'"	Bailey; Lee; Daugherty	The Trak Starz	4:01
13.	"We Do" (featuring Bun B)	Bailey; Lee; Daugherty; Bernard Freeman	The Trak Starz	3:19
14.	"Wurr Da 'Git It' Gurlz at?" (featuring G.I.B.)	Bailely; Lee; Daugherty; Larry Pullman; Bowers; Simms; Dionte Mikey Pullman; Richard Anderson	The Trak Starz	3:49
15.	"Bring Da Beef" (featuring G.I.B.)	Bailey; Lee; Daugherty; L. Pullman; Bowers; Simms; Anderson	The Trak Starz	4:12
16.	"(Outro)"			2:57

Bonus tracks
No.	Title	Writer(s)	Producer(s)	Length
17.	"Balla Baby (Remix)" (featuring Lil' Flip and Boozie of G.I.B.)	Bailey; McMasters; Wesley Weston; Bowers	Lil' Mack; DJ Matty Kats	4:01
18.	"What Up Wit It"	Bailey; Lee; Daugherty; Bowers; Anderson	The Trak Starz	4:04
19.	"Don't Really Care"	Bailey; Lee; Daugherty	Chingy; The Trak Starz	4:06

Sample credits

- "Don't Worry" contains interpolations from the composition "Me and You", written by Raphael Saadiq.
- "All the Way to St. Lou" contains samples from "Pass the Dutchie" as performed by Musical Youth, written by Headley Bennett, Huford Brown, Lloyd Ferguson, Robbie Lyn, Jackie Mittoo, Leroy Sibbles, and Fitzroy Simpson.

== Charts ==
=== Weekly charts ===
Chart (2004)	Peak position
Australian Albums (ARIA)	49
Australian Urban Albums (ARIA)	7
Canadian Albums (Nielsen SoundScan)	39
Canadian R&B Albums (Nielsen SoundScan)	11
Japanese Albums (Oricon)	15
New Zealand Albums (RMNZ)	22
Swiss Albums (Schweizer Hitparade)	83
UK Albums (OCC)	124
US Billboard 200	10
US Top R&B/Hip-Hop Albums (Billboard)	5

=== Year-end charts ===
Chart (2005)	Position
US Billboard 200	125
US Top R&B/Hip-Hop Albums (Billboard)	60

== Certifications ==
Region	Certification	Certified units/sales
United States (RIAA)	Platinum	1,000,000^{^}
^{^} Shipments figures based on certification alone.
