= Three Guests =

American vocal group

Three Guests (often abbreviated as 3G) are an American vocal group, formed in Erie, Pennsylvania in 2015. The group consists of Jordan Rys and Noah DeVore.

The group rose to fame with their debut single “Marilyn” (2017). They signed with Priority Records and released their single “die 4 u” (2017). In the following year they released their EP, 3G (2018) with Priority Records.

== History ==
In 2015 Noah DeVore began writing songs while playing the piano. He told Jordan Rys about the songs and they decided to form the band Three Guests. They bought inexpensive microphones to record and began performing at small local venues. They discovered TuneGO online and joined their site. This is how they were signed to TuneGO Music Group and decided to move to Las Vegas, where TuneGO is located.

In 2017 Three Guests released their first single and music video “Marilyn” (2017). They moved to Vegas to be closer to their label, TuneGO Music Group. They were signed to Priority Records in 2017 and released their single “die 4 u” (2017). In 2018 they released their first EP, 3G (2018) with Priority Records. With major success, they released their second EP Sunset Lane under TuneGO.

== Members ==
- Jordan Rys (2015–present)
- Noah DeVore (2015–present)
- Ben Waldee (2015-present)

== Discography ==
- "Marilyn" (2017)
- "die 4 u" (2017)
- 3G (2018)
- Sunset Lane (2018)

== Present ==
In July of 2020, the Three Guests released their final song, Perfume. After this release there has been no further news about the band.

== STIM ==
In November 2023, Jordan Rys and Ben Waldee formed a new hyperpop project called STIM. They debuted with the single, Safety and have gone on to release multiple singles and six EPs. STIM rose to fame with their track, Fury, which accumulated nearly 24 million streams. The group has collaborated with many artists, such as RJ Paisin, Stellar, Tom Frane, Dante Swan, Braden Ross, and Bennykaay.
