= Hate It or Love It (album) =

Studio album by Chingy
- Released: December 18, 2007
- Recorded: 2007
- Studios: The Bank (Atlanta, GA); Upstairs Studio (Atlanta, GA); The Ludaplex (Atlanta, GA); Metropolis Studios (London, UK); The Spot (Los Angeles, CA); Hit Factory Criteria (Miami, FL); Songbook Recording Studios (Keller, TX); L.T. Moe's Studio (Atlanta, GA); The Vault Studios (Miami, FL); Charles Holloman Productions (Charlotte, NC); Patchwerk Recordings (Atlanta, GA); Circle House Studios (Miami, FL)
- Genre: Hip-hop
- Length: 49:06
- Labels: DTP; Slot-A-Lot; Def Jam
- Producers: Bei Maejor; Calvo da Gr8; Cool & Dre; Full Scale; Jared Gosselin; Khao; LT Moe; Michael Davis; Phillip White; The Co-Stars; The Ghost Writers

Chingy chronology
Hoodstar (2006)	Hate It or Love It (2007)	Success & Failure (2010)

Singles from Hate It or Love It
- 1. "Fly Like Me" Released: November 13, 2007; 2. "Gimme Dat" Released: 2008

Professional ratings
Review scores
Source	Rating
AllMusic	2.5/5 stars
HipHopDX	2.5/5
laut.de	2/5 stars
PopMatters	2/10
RapReviews	7.5/10
USA Today	2.5/4 stars

Hate It or Love It is the fourth studio album by American rapper Chingy. It was released on December 18, 2007, via Disturbing tha Peace, Slot-A-Lot Records and Def Jam Recordings.

Recording sessions took place at The Bank, Upstairs Studio, The Ludaplex, L.T. Moe's Studio and PatchWerk Recording Studios in Atlanta, at Metropolis Studios in London, at The Spot in Los Angeles, at Hit Factory Criteria, The Vault Studios and Circle House Studios in Miami, at Songbook Recording Studios in Keller and at Charles Holloman Productions in Charlotte.

Production was handled by LT Moe, Maejor, Calvo da Gr8, Cool & Dre, Full Scale, Jared Gosselin, Kevin "Khao" Cates, Michael Davis, Phillip White, The Co-Stars and The Ghost Writers, with Chaka Zulu, Jeff Dixon and Ludacris serving as executive producers.

It features guest appearances from Amerie, Anthony Hamilton, Bobby V., Ludacris, Rick Ross, Steph Jones and Trey Songz.

In the United States, the album debuted at number 84 on the Billboard 200, number 17 on the Top R&B/Hip-Hop Albums and number 7 on the Top Rap Albums charts with first-week sales of 31,000 copies.

Its lead single, "Fly Like Me", made it to number 89 on the Billboard Hot 100, number 40 on the Hot R&B/Hip-Hop Songs, number 21 on the Hot Rap Songs and number 30 on the Rhythmic Airplay charts in the US. An accompanying music video for the second single off of the album, "Gimme Dat", was premiered on February 8, 2008, through TRL, 106 & Park and Yahoo Videos.

== Track listing ==
No.	Title	Writer(s)	Producer(s)	Length
1.	"Intro"		LT Moe	0:44
2.	"Hate It or Love It"	Howard Bailey; Jimi Dozier; Neely Dinkins, Jr.; Vito Colapietro	The Co-Stars	4:08
3.	"Check My Swag"	Bailey; Michael Davis	Michael Davis	3:33
4.	"Fly Like Me" (featuring Amerie)	Christopher Bridges; Tanya White; Billy Calloway; Todd Moore	LT Moe	3:45
5.	"Kick Drum"	Bailey; Steph Jones; Jared Gosselin; Phillip White	Jared Gosselin; Phillip White	3:40
6.	"Gimme Dat" (featuring Ludacris and Bobby Valentino)	Bailey; Bridges; Sean Garrett; Jordan Suecof	Full Scale	3:59
7.	"All Aboard (Ride It)" (featuring Steph Jones)	Bailey; Jones; Calvin Kenon Jr.	Calvo Da Gr8	4:04
8.	"Trickin' Off" (Skit)		LT Moe	0:22
9.	"Spend Some $" (featuring Trey Songz)	Bailey; Tremaine Neverson; Brandon Green; Lawrence Parker	Bei Maejor	3:32
10.	"2 Kool 2 Dance"	Bailey; Moore	LT Moe	3:47
11.	"Lovely Ladies"	Bailey; Kevin Cates	Khao	4:17
12.	"How We Feel" (featuring Anthony Hamilton)	Bailey; Anthony Hamilton; Moore; Jonathan Buck; Tim Kelley; Bob Robinson	LT Moe	4:14
13.	"Roll on 'Em" (featuring Rick Ross)	Bailey; William Roberts; Marcello Valenzano; Andre Lyon	Cool & Dre	4:28
14.	"Blockstar"	Bailey; Alex Francis; Dinavon Bythwood	The Ghost Writers	4:33
Total length:				49:06

Sample credits

- Track 9 contains interpolations from the composition "P Is Free" written by Lawrence Parker.
- Track 12 contains interpolations from "They Don't Know" written by Jonathan Buck, Tim Kelley and Bob Robinson.

== Personnel ==
- Howard "Chingy" Bailey Jr. – vocals
- Amerie Rogers – vocals (track 4)
- Gyrlfriend – backing vocals (track 4)
- Christopher "Ludacris" Bridges – vocals (track 6), executive producer
- Bobby Marcel "Bobby V." Wilson – vocals (track 6), additional vocals (track 12)
- Steph Jones – vocals (track 7)
- Brittany "Diamond" Carpentero – additional vocals (track 8)
- Tremaine "Trey Songz" Neverson – vocals (track 9)
- Kevin "Khao" Cates – additional vocals & producer (track 11)
- Amber Mason – additional vocals (track 11)
- Michelle Collins – additional vocals (track 11)
- Anthony Hamilton – vocals (track 12)
- O'Shea "Ice Cube" Jackson – additional vocals (track 12)
- William "Rick Ross" Roberts II – vocals (track 13)
- Princeton – bass (track 6)
- Todd "LT Moe" Moore – producer (tracks: 1, 4, 8, 10, 12)
- Jimi "G6" Dozier – producer (track 2)
- Neely Dinkins Jr. – producer (track 2)
- Vito Colapietro – producer (track 2)
- Michael Davis – producer (track 3)
- Jared Gosselin – producer & mixing (track 5)
- Phillip White – producer (track 5)
- Jordan Suecof – producer (track 6)
- Calvin "Calvo Da Gr8" Kenon Jr. – producer (track 7)
- Brandon "Maejor" Green – producer & recording (track 9)
- Marcello "Cool" Valenzano – producer (track 13)
- Andre "Dre" Lyon – producer (track 13)
- Alex Francis – producer (track 14)
- Dinavon Bythwood – producer (track 14)
- Paul Sheehy – recording (tracks: 2, 9)
- Ryan Sheldon – recording (tracks: 3, 14)
- Josh Monroy – recording (tracks: 4, 6)
- Neil Tucker – recording (track 4)
- Dror Mohar – recording (track 5)
- Javier Valverde – recording (track 7)
- Troy Taylor – recording (track 9)
- Eddie Hernandez – recording (tracks: 10, 12, 14), mixing assistant (track 1)
- Vernon Mungo – recording (track 10)
- Rob Skipworth – recording (track 11)
- Bruce Irvine – recording (track 12)
- Mike Wilson – recording (track 12)
- Gina Victoria – recording (track 13)
- Ray Seay – mixing (track 1)
- Leslie Brathwaite – mixing (tracks: 2–4, 7–12, 14)
- Phil Tan – mixing (track 6)
- Fabian Marasciullo – mixing (track 13)
- Justin Trawick – mixing assistant (tracks: 2–4, 7–12, 14)
- Josh Houghkirk – mixing assistant (track 6)
- Chad Jolley – mixing assistant (track 13)
- Glenn Schick – mastering
- Jeff Dixon – executive producer
- Chaka Zulu – executive producer

== Charts ==
Chart (2008)	Peak position
US Billboard 200	84
US Top R&B/Hip-Hop Albums (Billboard)	17
US Top Rap Albums (Billboard)	7
