= One Call Away (Chingy song) =

2004 single by Chingy

Single by Chingy featuring J-Weav

from the album Jackpot
- B-side: "Bagg Up"
- Released: January 12, 2004
- Genre: Hip-hop
- Length: 4:36 (album version); 4:20 (edited version)
- Label: Capitol; Disturbing tha Peace
- Songwriters: Alonzo Lee; Shamar Daugherty; Howard Bailey, Jr.; Sedrick Martin
- Producer: The Trak Starz

Chingy singles chronology
"Holidae In" (2003)	"One Call Away" (2004)	"I Like That" (2004)

J-Weav singles chronology
"Stay with Me" (1996)	"One Call Away" (2004)

Music video
- "One Call Away" on YouTube

"One Call Away" is a song by American rapper Chingy, featuring American actor and singer Jason Weaver singing the chorus, credited as J-Weav. It was released as the third and final single off Chingy's debut album, Jackpot (2003), on January 12, 2004 through Capitol Records and Ludacris's Disturbing tha Peace label. The song peaked at number two on the US Billboard Hot 100 and topped the Billboard Hot Rap Tracks chart for three weeks. Worldwide, it reached the top 40 in Australia, Ireland, New Zealand, and the United Kingdom. A video for the single (directed by Erik White) was released that featured actress Keshia Knight Pulliam and streetball player Philip "Hot Sauce" Champion.

== Critical reception ==
Matt Cibula of PopMatters was positive towards "One Call Away", admiring Chingy for taking on a rap ballad saying "It’s kind of adorable that he’s talking to her on the phone about politics and life when he can’t be with her, and his voice gets all softened when he talks about her, and his homeboys call him weak when he gives her a kiss on the cheek, but he doesn’t care, because he knows that she’s always just one call away from him, and vice versa."

== Music video ==
Directed by Erik White, the video takes place during autumn and follows Chingy going to the DTP Bank in his Cadillac, where he attracts the attention of a bank teller (played by actress Keshia Knight Pulliam) by giving her his phone number along with the deposited money in a canister tube for her to have. Their relationship starts out slow with her hanging out with his friends in his apartment, she and her friends watching him play streetball to both of them going back to his apartment to get intimate with each other. The video features the chorus of "Chingy Jackpot" at the end. Streetball player Philip "Hot Sauce" Champion appears in the streetball scene in the video.

== Track listings ==
US 12-inch single

1. "One Call Away" (edited radio version featuring J-Weav)
2. "One Call Away" (album version featuring J-Weav)
3. "One Call Away" (instrumental)
4. "Bagg Up" (edited radio version)
5. "Bagg Up" (album version)
6. "Bagg Up" (instrumental)

UK CD single

1. "One Call Away" (featuring J-Weav)
2. "Bagg Up"

European CD single

1. "One Call Away" (featuring J-Weav) – 4:36
2. "Bagg Up" – 3:21
3. "Chingy Jackpot" – 4:08

Australian CD single

1. "One Call Away" (edited radio version featuring J-Weav) – 4:18
2. "Bagg Up" (edited version) – 3:21
3. "Right Thurr" (remix featuring Jermaine Dupri and Trina) – 3:43
4. "One Call Away" (instrumental) – 4:42

== Charts ==
=== Weekly charts ===
Chart (2004)	Peak position
Australia (ARIA)	5
Australian Urban (ARIA)	2
Belgium (Ultratip Bubbling Under Flanders)	2
Belgium (Ultratip Bubbling Under Wallonia)	14
France (SNEP)	51
Germany (GfK)	88
Ireland (IRMA)	25
Italy (FIMI)	43
Netherlands (Dutch Top 40 Tipparade)	4
Netherlands (Single Top 100)	52
New Zealand (Recorded Music NZ)	3
Scotland Singles (OCC)	42
Switzerland (Schweizer Hitparade)	46
UK Singles (OCC)	26
UK Hip Hop/R&B (OCC)	6
US Billboard Hot 100	2
US Hot R&B/Hip-Hop Songs (Billboard)	3
US Hot Rap Songs (Billboard)	1
US Pop Airplay (Billboard)	6
US Rhythmic Airplay (Billboard)	3

=== Year-end charts ===
Chart (2004)	Position
Australia (ARIA)	39
Australian Urban (ARIA)	14
New Zealand (RIANZ)	30
US Billboard Hot 100	25
US Hot R&B/Hip-Hop Singles & Tracks (Billboard)	31
US Hot Rap Tracks (Billboard)	13
US Mainstream Top 40 (Billboard)	43
US Rhythmic Top 40 (Billboard)	11

== Certifications ==
Region	Certification	Certified units/sales
Australia (ARIA)	Platinum	70,000^{^}
New Zealand (RMNZ)	Platinum	30,000^{‡}
United States (RIAA)	Gold	500,000^{*}
^{*} Sales figures based on certification alone.^{^} Shipments figures based on certification alone.^{‡} Sales+streaming figures based on certification alone.

== Release history ==
Region	Date	Format(s)	Label(s)	Ref.
United States	January 12, 2004	Rhythmic contemporary; urban radio	Capitol; Disturbing tha Peace	
Australia	May 3, 2004	CD	Capitol; Disturbing tha Peace	
United Kingdom	May 17, 2004	CD	Capitol; Disturbing tha Peace	

== See also ==
- List of Billboard number-one rap singles of the 2000s
