= Fly Like Me =

Single by Chingy featuring Amerie

from the album Hate It or Love It
- Released: November 13, 2007 (U.S.)
- Recorded: 2007
- Genre: Pop rap; R&B
- Length: 3:44
- Label: Slot-A-Lot, DTP, Def Jam
- Songwriters: LT Moe, Howie Bailey, Amerie Rogers, Chris Bridges
- Producer: LT Moe

Chingy singles chronology
| "Celebrity Chick" (2007) | "Fly Like Me" (2007) | "Gimme Dat" (2008) |

Amerie singles chronology
| "Gotta Work" (2007) | "Fly Like Me" (2007) | "Why R U" (2009) |

"Fly Like Me" is a song by American rapper Chingy. It is the first single from his fourth album Hate It or Love It (2007). It features singer Amerie and has, in Chingy's words, a "mainstream feel" similar to that of the 2005 single "Pimpin' All Over the World" by rapper Ludacris, who was originally to have been featured on the song alongside singer Rihanna. The song was released on November 13, 2007 but was a commercial failure as it stalled at number 89 on the Billboard Hot 100, however it went to number 40 on the Hot R&B/Hip-Hop Songs chart. From October 12, "Fly like Me" was available for streaming on Def Jam Recordings' official website. "Fly Like Me" remains Chingy's last song on any chart.

== Charts ==
| Chart (2007) | Peak position |
|---|---|
| Japan (Japan Hot 100) | 44 |
| US Billboard Hot 100 | 88 |
| US Hot R&B/Hip-Hop Songs (Billboard) | 40 |
| US Hot Rap Songs (Billboard) | 21 |
| US Rhythmic Airplay (Billboard) | 30 |
