= I Like That (Houston song) =

2004 single by Houston featuring Chingy, Nate Dogg and I-20

Single by Houston featuring Chingy, Nate Dogg and I-20

from the album It's Already Written
- Released: May 10, 2004
- Length: 3:56
- Label: Capitol
- Songwriters: Houston Summers; Alonzo Lee; Shamar Daugherty; Mischke Butler; Howie Bailey; Nathaniel Hale; Bobby Sandimanie; Steve Prudholme
- Producer: The Trak Starz

Houston singles chronology
"I Like That" (2004)	"Ain't Nothing Wrong" (2004)

Chingy singles chronology
"One Call Away" (2004)	"I Like That" (2004)	"Balla Baby" (2004)

Nate Dogg singles chronology
"Time's Up" (2004)	"I Like That" (2004)	"So Fly" (2004)

Music video
- "I Like That" on YouTube

"I Like That" is a song by American R&B singer Houston. It is the first single released from his debut album, It's Already Written (2004). The song features Chingy, Nate Dogg, and I-20. Released on May 10, 2004, "I Like That" peaked at number three on the US Billboard Rhythmic Top 40 chart and at number 11 on both the Billboard Hot 100 and the UK Singles Chart. The song also charted within the top 40 in several other countries, including Australia, France, Italy, New Zealand and Switzerland.

== Music video ==
The official music video for the song was directed by Jeremy Rall.

== Track listings ==
US and Australian CD single

1. "I Like That" (album version)
2. "I Like That" (extended version)
3. "I Like That" (radio edit)
4. "I Like That" (instrumental)

US and UK 12-inch single

A1. "I Like That" (album version)
A2. "I Like That" (instrumental)
B1. "I Like That" (extended version)

UK CD single

1. "I Like That" (album version)
2. "I Like That" (extended version)

French CD single

1. "I Like That" (radio edit) – 3:56
2. "I Like That" (extended version) – 6:31
3. "I Like That" (instrumental) – 3:56

== Charts ==
=== Weekly charts ===
Chart (2004)	Peak position
Australia (ARIA)	12
Australian Club Chart (ARIA)	17
Australian Urban (ARIA)	2
Belgium (Ultratop 50 Flanders)	26
Belgium (Ultratop 50 Wallonia)	14
Belgium Dance (Ultratop Flanders)	18
Canada CHR/Pop Top 30 (Radio & Records)	15
Denmark (Tracklisten)	17
Europe (Eurochart Hot 100)	13
France (SNEP)	29
Germany (GfK)	18
Hungary (Dance Top 40)	38
Ireland (IRMA)	39
Italy (FIMI)	28
Netherlands (Dutch Top 40)	13
Netherlands (Single Top 100)	17
New Zealand (Recorded Music NZ)	4
Norway (VG-lista)	14
Romania (Romanian Top 100)	99
Scottish Singles Sales (Official Charts)	29
Sweden (Sverigetopplistan)	42
Switzerland (Schweizer Hitparade)	5
UK Singles (Official Charts)	11
UK Hip Hop/R&B (Official Charts)	4
US Billboard Hot 100	11
US Hot R&B/Hip-Hop Songs (Billboard)	14
US Hot Rap Songs (Billboard)	6
US Pop Airplay (Billboard)	9
US Rhythmic Airplay (Billboard)	3

=== Year-end charts ===
Chart (2004)	Position
Australia (ARIA)	70
Australian Club Chart (ARIA)	43
Belgium (Ultratop 50 Wallonia)	97
New Zealand (RIANZ)	26
Switzerland (Schweizer Hitparade)	60
UK Urban (Music Week)	29
US Billboard Hot 100	52
US Hot R&B/Hip-Hop Singles & Tracks (Billboard)	77
US Mainstream Top 40 (Billboard)	45
US Rhythmic Top 40 (Billboard)	13

== Certifications ==
Region	Certification	Certified units/sales
Australia (ARIA)	Gold	35,000^{^}
United States (RIAA)	Gold	500,000^{*}
^{*} Sales figures based on certification alone.^{^} Shipments figures based on certification alone.

== Release history ==
Region	Date	Format(s)	Label(s)	Ref.
United States	May 10, 2004	Rhythmic contemporary; urban radio	Capitol	
Australia	September 6, 2004	CD	Capitol	
United Kingdom	September 6, 2004	CD	Capitol	
