= Jason Weaver =

American actor

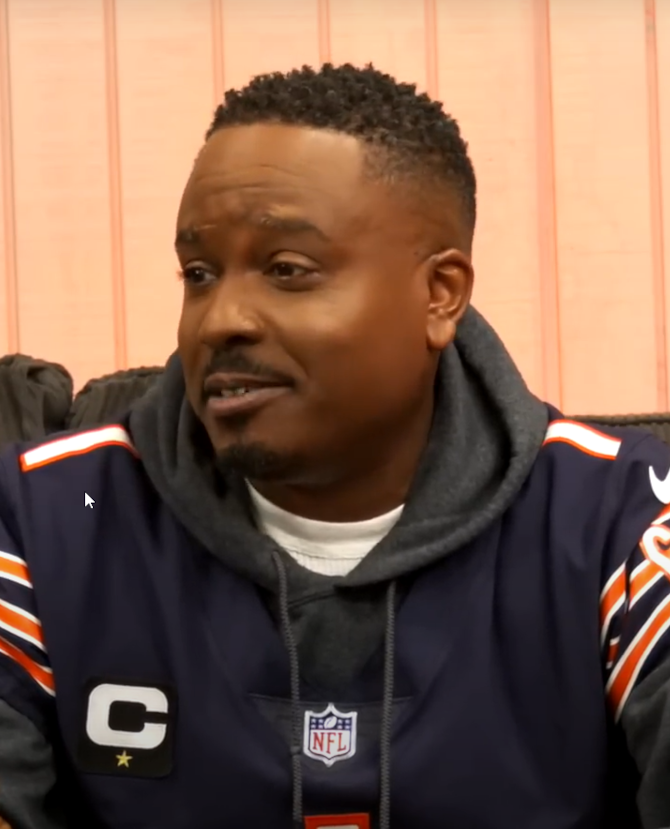
- Weaver in 2023

Background information
- Also known as: J-Weav
- Born: Jason Michael Weaver; July 18, 1979 (age 47); Chicago, Illinois, U.S.
- Genre: R&B
- Occupations: Actor, singer
- Years active: 1990–present
- Label: Motown
- Children: 1

Jason Michael Weaver (born July 18, 1979) is an American actor and singer best known for his roles as Marcus Henderson on The WB sitcom Smart Guy, Jerome Turrell on the short-lived sitcom Thea from 1993 to 1994, and the preteen Michael Jackson on the 1992 miniseries The Jacksons: An American Dream, both of which originally aired on ABC. He was also the singing voice of the young Simba in Walt Disney Feature Animation 1994 film The Lion King. As a recording artist, he is best known for his guest appearance on Chingy's 2004 hit single "One Call Away", which peaked at number two on the Billboard Hot 100.

== Career ==
=== Acting career ===
One of Weaver's earliest acting roles was on Oprah Winfrey's 1990 television series Brewster Place. He went on to portray a pre-teen Michael Jackson (aged 9-14) in the 1992 miniseries The Jacksons: An American Dream, and starred on the television sitcoms Thea (1993–1994) and Smart Guy (1997–1999). In 1992, he provided the singing voice of young Simba in Disney's 1994 animated feature film The Lion King.

In 2002, Weaver appeared in Drumline with Nick Cannon, followed by a role in The Ladykillers in 2004. In 2004, he also was a featured artist in the song "One Call Away", as well as in the music video that also starred Keshia Knight Pulliam and AND1 baller Phillip "Hot Sauce" Champion. In 2006, Weaver was featured in a supporting role in the film ATL starring rappers T.I. and Big Boi from OutKast. He also appeared as an extra in the music video "Rock Yo Hips" by Crime Mob featuring Lil Scrappy and "Make Up Bag" by The-Dream featuring T.I. In 2011, he starred in the film He's Mine Not Yours alongside Caryn Ward, Wendy Raquel Robinson, Carl Anthony Payne II and Clifton Powell. He is also in the hit TV show The Chi.

=== Focus on music ===
Weaver is also a recording artist. He provided vocals for his role as Michael Jackson in The Jacksons: An American Dream and as the singing voice of the cub Simba in Disney's 1994 animated feature film The Lion King.

His debut album, Love Ambition, was released on Motown Records on June 27, 1995. He released two versions of the song "Stay with Me".

In 2003, he collaborated with hip-hop rapper Chingy on the track "One Call Away". The single was a top five hit in the United States.

== Personal life ==
Weaver is the son of Marilyn "Kitty" Haywood and Robert Lincoln Weaver. Haywood is a member of the Chicago-based female vocal group Kitty & the Haywoods, who backed with the late Aretha Franklin on the soundtrack album to the 1976 film Sparkle.

Weaver studied at Thornwood High School. He has one son named Jaylen.

== Discography ==
=== Albums ===
List of studio albums, with selected chart positions
Title	Album details	Peak chart positions
Title	Album details	US R&B
Love Ambition	Released: June 27, 1995; Label: Motown; Format: CD, cassette	69

=== Singles ===
List of singles, with selected chart positions and parent album
Title	Year	Peak chart positions	Album
Title	Year	US R&B	Album
"I Wanna Be Where You Are"	1992	—	Non-album single
"Love Ambition (Call on Me)"	1995	32	Love Ambition
"I Can't Stand the Pain"	1995	60	Love Ambition
"Stay with Me"	1996	59	Non-album single
"I Don't Know Why"	1996	-	Non-album single
"One Call Away" (Chingy featuring J-Weav)	2004	3	Jackpot

== Filmography ==
=== Film ===
Year	Title	Role	Notes
1990	The Long Walk Home	Franklin Cotter	
1990	The Kid Who Loved Christmas	Ernie	TV movie
1994	The Lion King	Young Simba (singing)	Voice
1994	Summertime Switch	Fast Freddie Egan	TV movie
2000	Freedom Song	Isaac Hawkins	TV movie
2002	Drumline	Ernest	
2004	The Ladykillers	Weemack Funthes	
2006	ATL	Teddy	
2008	Love For Sale	Vince	
2008	Jada	Jamal	
2010	Grown Man	Himself	TV movie
2010	Lottery Ticket	Ray Ray	
2011	He's Mine Not Yours	Kent	
2012	Dysfunctional Friends	Gary	
2012	Note to Self	Jay Lewis	
2013	Hope for Love	Ricky	
2013	When a Woman's Fed Up	Troy	
2013	Marry Me for Christmas	Franklin	TV movie
2013	What Would You Do for Love	Troy	TV movie
2014	Wal-Bob's	Keith Harrington	
2015	Infidelity	Frankie	
2016	Merry Ex-Mas	Perry	TV movie
2017	Another Man Will	-	
2017	BlacKorea	Mark Senior	Short
2021	AM Radio	Willie the Silly DJ	

=== Television ===
Year	Title	Role	Notes
1990	Brewster Place	Matthew Thomas	Main cast
1992	The Jacksons: An American Dream	Michael Jackson (aged 9–14)	Episode: "Part I & II"
1993–94	Thea	Jerome Turrell	Main cast
1995	Soul Train	Himself	Episode: "Aaron Neville/Silk/Jason Weaver"
1996	Sister, Sister	Nicky/Darnell	Episode: "Summer Bummer" & "Boy from the Hood"
1997–99	Smart Guy	Marcus Henderson	Main cast
2011–14	The LeBrons	Condor (voice)	Main cast
2014	Let's Stay Together	Curtis	Recurring cast: season 4
2015	Black-ish	Ta-Ta	Episode: "Chop Shop"
2016	Nubbin & Friends	Ollie the Squirrell (voice)	Episode: "The Letter "A""
2018	Unsung	Himself	Episode: "The Boys"
2020	Boomerang	Barber	Episode: "Reversal of a Dog"
2021	We Stay Looking	Miles	Episode: "Red Flavored Drink"
2016–2026	The Chi	Rashaad "Shaad" Marshall	Recurring
2023	Sistas	Brian	Recurring cast: season 6

== Awards and nominations ==
Year	Award	Category	Title of work	Result
1993	Young Artist Award	Outstanding Young Performers Starring in a Mini-Series	The Jacksons: An American Dream (Shared with Alex Burrall)	Won
1994	Young Artist Award	Outstanding Youth Ensemble in a Television Series	Thea (Shared with Brenden Jefferson, Adam Jeffries, Brandy Norwood)	Nominated
1995	Young Artist Award	Best Performance by a Young Actor in a Voiceover - TV or Movie	The Lion King	Won
