= Holidae In =

2003 single by Chingy

Single by Chingy featuring Ludacris and Snoop Dogg

from the album Jackpot
- B-side: "Represent"
- Released: August 25, 2003
- Length: 5:14 (album version); 4:32 (clean version)
- Label: Capitol; Disturbing tha Peace
- Songwriters: Alonzo Lee; Shamar Daugherty; Howard Bailey, Jr.; Chris Bridges
- Producer: The Trak Starz

Chingy singles chronology
"Right Thurr" (2003)	"Holidae In" (2003)	"One Call Away" (2004)

Ludacris singles chronology
"Stand Up" (2003)	"Holidae In" (2003)	"Hot & Wet" (2003)

Snoop Dogg singles chronology
"It Blows My Mind" (2003)	"Holidae In" (2003)	"P.I.M.P." (2003)

Music video
- "Holidae In" on YouTube

"Holidae In" is a song by American rapper Chingy featuring Ludacris and Snoop Dogg. It was released on August 25, 2003, by Capitol Records and Ludacris' Disturbing tha Peace record label as the second single off his debut album, Jackpot (2003). Produced by the duo the Trak Starz, the release garnered positive reviews from critics who praised the performances. In 2020, Entertainment Weekly wrote that the legacy of the song was that increased the "coolness factor" of Holiday Inn.

== Critical reception ==
Nathan Rabin of The A.V. Club was positive towards "Holidae In", finding Chingy being able to hold his own opposite Ludacris and Snoop Dogg saying "it seems less like two icons helping out a scrappy newcomer than like a collaboration among three bona fide superstars." Billboard contributor Rashaun Hall praised the appearances of all three rappers throughout the track, giving note of both Chingy's "nasal flow" and Ludacris' "booming voice" mixing well and Snoop's "laid-back" delivery of the hook, raising it above your "typical party track". Matt Cibula of PopMatters panned the song, finding the scenario tiring and its guest stars contributed nothing to it, saying, "Big stars phoning it in is always a turn-off, and the fact that they bury this song at track #12 is telling. No one likes this stuff."

== Commercial performance ==
The single debuted at number 73 on US Billboard Hot 100 chart the week of September 20, 2003. By October 4, the single had entered the top 40. In November, the St. Louis rapper was added to a nationwide promotional tour with the Atlanta-based rappers Ludacris, Lil Jon & The Eastside Boyz, Ying Yang Twins and singer, Mýa. The tour included a number of music festivals arranged by local radio stations. The single went on to reach the top 10 across nine Billboard charts and remained on all nine charts for 21 weeks or more.

== Music video ==
Directed by independent film and music video director Jeremy Rall, the video takes inspiration from the music video for the song "Temptations" featured on Tupac Shakur's third studio album, Me Against the World (1995), and its song title features a hotel setting. Shot from viewer's perspective, the camera is guided through a high end mansion/hotel called the Jackpot Inn. Every room has a special feature including a sleeproom, a pillow fight room (Room 102), Jamaican smoke room (Room 103), and a neon glowing room (fitness room). There is also a Brady Bunch parody segment and T-shirts that parody the logos of Holiday Inn and Atlanta based company, Home Depot (but reads as "The Ho Depot"). Filmed years after his death, an actor bearing a resemblance to Shakur is also in the video.

The video was nominated for a 2004 MTV Video Music Award for Best Hip-Hop Video but lost to OutKast's "Hey Ya!".

== Track listings ==
US and Australian CD single

1. "Holidae In" (clean version) (featuring Ludacris and Snoop Dogg) – 4:32
2. "Represent" (clean version) (featuring Tity Boi and I-20) – 4:12
3. "Holidae In" (instrumental) (featuring Ludacris and Snoop Dogg) – 4:32

US 12-inch single

1. "Holidae In" (clean version) (featuring Ludacris and Snoop Dogg) – 4:30
2. "Holidae In" (album version) (featuring Ludacris and Snoop Dogg) – 5:13
3. "Holidae In" (instrumental) (featuring Ludacris and Snoop Dogg) – 5:13
4. "Represent" (clean version) (featuring Tity Boi and I-20) – 4:12
5. "Represent" (album version) (featuring Tity Boi and I-20) – 4:12
6. "Represent" (instrumental) (featuring Tity Boi and I-20) – 4:12

UK CD1

1. "Holidae In" (radio clean version) (featuring Ludacris and Snoop Dogg)
2. "Holidae In" (video) (featuring Ludacris and Snoop Dogg)
3. "Represent" (clean) (featuring Tity Boi and I-20)
4. "Right Thurr" (video)

UK CD2

1. "Holidae In" (radio clean version) (featuring Ludacris and Snoop Dogg)
2. "Represent" (clean) (featuring Tity Boi and I-20)

UK 12-inch single

A1. "Holidae In" (explicit version) (featuring Ludacris and Snoop Dogg) – 5:14
A2. "Holidae In" (instrumental) (featuring Ludacris and Snoop Dogg) – 5:15
B1. "Represent" (clean version) (featuring Tity Boi and I-20) – 4:12

== Charts ==
=== Weekly charts ===
Chart (2003–2004)	Peak position
Australia (ARIA)	13
Australian Urban (ARIA)	5
Denmark (Tracklisten)	14
Germany (GfK)	56
Ireland (IRMA)	27
Italy (FIMI)	31
Netherlands (Single Top 100)	67
New Zealand (Recorded Music NZ)	4
Scotland Singles (OCC)	55
Switzerland (Schweizer Hitparade)	43
UK Singles (OCC)	35
UK Hip Hop/R&B (OCC)	6
US Billboard Hot 100	3
US Hot R&B/Hip-Hop Songs (Billboard)	2
US Hot Rap Songs (Billboard)	2
US Pop Airplay (Billboard)	13
US Rhythmic Airplay (Billboard)	1

=== Year-end charts ===
Chart (2003)	Position
US Billboard Hot 100	76
US Hot R&B/Hip-Hop Singles & Tracks (Billboard)	58
US Rhythmic Top 40 (Billboard)	28

Chart (2004)	Position
Australia (ARIA)	71
New Zealand (RIANZ)	23
US Billboard Hot 100	87
US Hot R&B/Hip-Hop Singles & Tracks (Billboard)	79
US Rhythmic Top 40 (Billboard)	43

== Certifications ==
Region	Certification	Certified units/sales
Australia (ARIA)	Gold	35,000^{^}
New Zealand (RMNZ)	Gold	15,000^{‡}
United States (RIAA)	Gold	500,000^{*}
^{*} Sales figures based on certification alone.^{^} Shipments figures based on certification alone.^{‡} Sales+streaming figures based on certification alone.

== Release history ==
Region	Date	Format(s)	Label(s)	Ref.
United States	August 25, 2003	Urban radio	Capitol; Disturbing tha Peace	
Australia	January 19, 2004	CD	Capitol; Disturbing tha Peace	
United Kingdom	February 9, 2004	12-inch vinyl; CD	Capitol; Disturbing tha Peace	
