= Houston (singer) =

American contemporary R&B singer

- Born: Houston Edward Summers IV; October 26, 1983 (age 42)
- Origin: Los Angeles, California, U.S.
- Genres: R&B
- Occupation: Singer
- Years active: 2003–2005
- Label: Capitol

Houston Edward Summers IV (born October 26, 1983), known mononymously as Houston, is an American former R&B singer, best known for his 2004 single "I Like That" (featuring Chingy and Nate Dogg).

In 2005, Houston attempted suicide in a London hotel room, and later gouged his eye out with a fork on the 1st floor of his hotel building. He was subsequently dropped from his contract with Capitol Records.

== Early life ==
Summers attended the Academy of Music at Hamilton High School in Los Angeles. He would regularly be invited to participate in activities taking place in the school's music academy. His management team recorded a videotape of Summers's performances, which they hoped would help the singer land a recording contract. He was signed to Capitol Records.

== Career ==
Houston's debut single, "I Like That" featuring Chingy and Nate Dogg was released on March 13, 2004, and was a hit therefore peaking at number three on the US Billboard Hot R&B/Hip-Hop Songs chart and number 11 on both Billboard Hot 100 and the UK Singles Chart. His debut and only album, It's Already Written was released on August 10, 2004, being certified gold by the Recording Industry Association of America (RIAA).

== 2005 suicide attempt ==
On January 27, 2005, while on tour in London, England, Summers suffered an emotional breakdown and reportedly tried to commit suicide by jumping from a hotel window while under the influence of PCP. When people in his entourage stopped him, he was restrained and locked in a first floor room. While in that room, Summers gouged his left eye out with a plastic fork. After the incident, Summers was arrested by London police and was sent to a rehabilitation facility. After a two-week stint in rehab, Houston went home to Los Angeles and apologized for the incident. Houston attributed the incident to stress caused by the music industry, saying: "Everything was clobbering down on me. Everything was going a little bit too hard on me".

== Discography ==
=== Albums ===
List of albums, with selected chart positions and certifications
Title	Album details	Peak chart positions					Certifications
Title	Album details	US	US R&B	FRA	SWI	UK	Certifications
It's Already Written	Released: August 10, 2004; Label: Capitol; Format: CD, digital download	14	8	83	50	101	RIAA: Gold

=== Singles ===
List of singles, with selected chart positions and certifications, showing year released and album name
Title	Year	Peak chart positions										Certifications	Album
Title	Year	US	US R&B	AUS	BEL (FL)	FRA	GER	IRE	NZ	SWI	UK	Certifications	Album
"I Like That" (featuring Chingy, Nate Dogg, and I-20)	2004	11	14	12	26	29	18	39	4	5	11	RIAA: Gold; ARIA: Gold	It's Already Written
"Ain't Nothing Wrong"	2004	—	70	52	61	—	—	—	—	—	33		It's Already Written
"—" denotes a recording that did not chart or was not released in that territory.
