= Right Thurr =

2003 single by Chingy

Single by Chingy

from the album Jackpot
- B-side: "Mobb wit Me"
- Released: April 14, 2003
- Genre: Dirty South
- Length: 4:10 (album version); 3:35 (radio version); 3:42 (remix version)
- Label: Capitol; Priority; Disturbing tha Peace
- Songwriters: Alonzo Lee; Shamar Daugherty; Howard Bailey Jr.
- Producer: The Trak Starz

Chingy singles chronology
| "Right Thurr" (2003) | "Holidae In" (2003) |

Music video
- "Right Thurr" (remix) on YouTube

"Right Thurr" is a song by American rapper Chingy, released as his debut single on April 14, 2003. Written by Chingy alongside the Trak Starz, it served as the lead single from his first album, Jackpot (2003). The song received positive reviews from critics, who praised the production and Chingy's addictive delivery.

"Right Thurr" stayed at number two on the US Billboard Hot 100 for five non-consecutive weeks, giving Chingy his first of three top-five hits on that chart. It also became a number-one hit on the Billboard Hot Rap Tracks chart for four weeks and peaked at number two on the Billboard Hot R&B/Hip-Hop Singles & Tracks chart. Worldwide, the song reached number one in New Zealand and peaked within the top 20 in Australia, Canada, Denmark, Norway, and the United Kingdom. It was certified gold in Australia, Canada, and New Zealand.

An accompanying music video for the song, directed by Jessy Terrero, takes place in Chingy's birthplace of St. Louis. An official remix for the song was made as a bonus track on the album that featured rappers Jermaine Dupri and Trina. A music video for the remix, directed by Jeremy Rall, features all three artists dancing on an all-white backdrop.

== Critical reception ==
Matt Cibula of PopMatters liked Chingy's choice of playing a pimp-like character for the song "Right Thurr", saying "there’s something to his voice, a certain awed respect for the absolutely amazing qualities of southern women, that puts the song over the top." Jason Birchmeier of AllMusic called it an "instant party rap classic". John Mulvey of NME gave a mixed review of the song, noticing the imitation Neptunes beat from the Trak Starz and Chingy's limitation as a rapper, but still found it to be "utterly irresistible" concluding that "It's all terribly Dirty South, as you'd imagine, but Chingy's soft and compelling way with the letter 'r' is weirdly Devonian, too. Which isn't something you can say about most potty-mouthed hip-hop prodigies these days. Nice wurrk."

== Commercial performance ==
"Right Thurr" debuted on the Billboard Hot 100 the week of May 17, 2003, at number 97. Six weeks later, it moved ten spots from number 31 to 21 the week of June 28, 2003. It moved six spots to number 15 the week of July 5, 2003. It entered the top 10 on the week of July 12, 2003, by moving six spots to number nine. It reached the top five by moving five spots to number four the week of July 19, 2003. It peaked at number two for five non-consecutive weeks, starting on the week of August 9, 2003. It stayed on the chart for thirty-three weeks.

== Music video ==
Directed by Jessy Terrero, the video takes place at Beacon Ave. in Walnut Park East, St. Louis where Chingy is with his friends outside the porch of his house and is attracted by several women walking past his house. It moves to a club run where DJ Quik DJs, where Chingy is performing on stage and partying with his friends while throwing money in the air, and at Courtesy Diner where Chingy is hanging out inside and outside of the diner. It ends with a late-night shot of the Gateway Arch intercut with fade shots of Chingy at the club. Ludacris, Murphy Lee, Kyjuan, The Trak Starz and Tity Boi make cameo appearances in the video.

An uncut version of the video featured extended scenes from the club of various women in bras and thongs doing suggestive dances on the people and/or each other. It was only shown at late-night on BET: Uncut and on the enhanced CD/DVD version of the album.

== Live performance ==
Chingy made his US television debut performing "Right Thurr" on The Tonight Show with Jay Leno on July 17, 2003.

== Remix ==
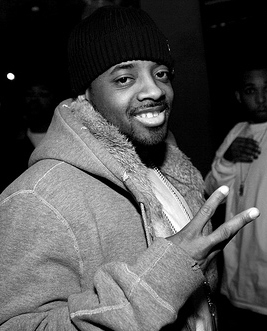
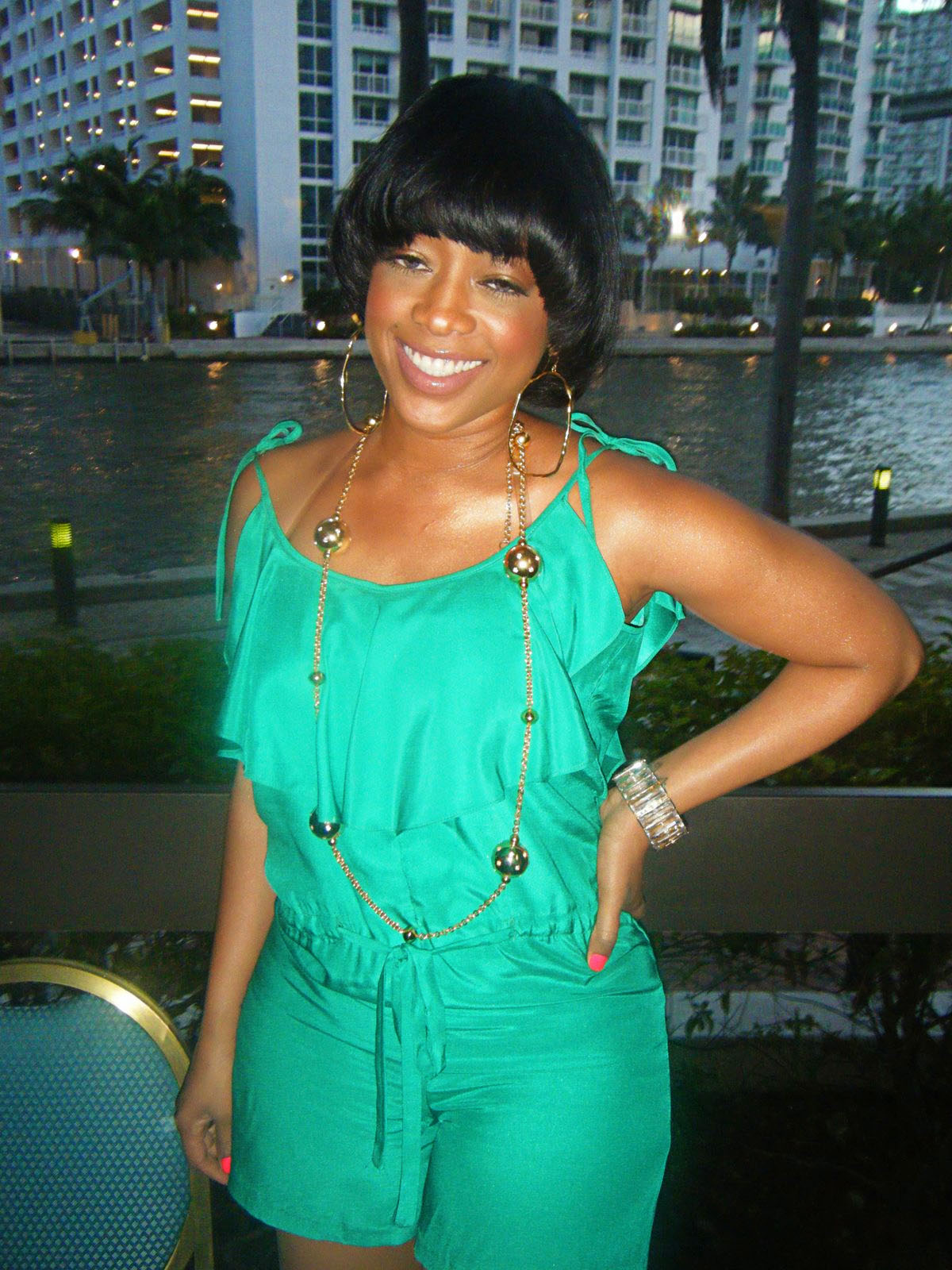
Rappers Jermaine Dupri (left) and Trina both appear on the remix of this song.

An official remix for the song was made as a bonus track on the album that featured rappers Jermaine Dupri and Trina. A video (found in the CD/DVD version of the album) was made for the remix that featured all three artists on an all white backdrop dancing together with people around them. The video was directed by Jeremy Rall. This version won the Remix of the Year award at the 2004 Source Awards.

== Awards and nominations ==
| Year | Ceremony | Award | Result |
|---|---|---|---|
| 2004 | The Source Awards | Single of the Year | Won |

== Track listings ==
US CD single

1. "Right Thurr" – 3:36
2. "Mobb wit Me" – 3:46
3. "Right Thurr" (video)

US 12-inch single

A1. "Right Thurr" (radio version) – 3:36
A2. "Right Thurr" (instrumental) – 3:38
B1. "Mobb wit Me" (radio version) – 3:48
B2. "Mobb wit Me" (album version) – 3:46
B3. "Mobb wit Me" (instrumental) – 3:49

Australian CD single

1. "Right Thurr" (radio version—clean)
2. "Mobb wit Me"
3. "Right Thurr" (remix featuring Trina—clean)

UK CD1

1. "Right Thurr" (radio edit) – 3:36
2. "Mobb wit Me" – 3:46
3. "Right Thurr" (remix) – 3:39
4. "Right Thurr" (video) – 3:59

UK CD2 and European CD single

1. "Right Thurr" – 3:36
2. "Mobb wit Me" – 3:46

UK 12-inch single

A1. "Right Thurr" (radio version) – 3:36
A2. "Right Thurr" (instrumental) – 3:39
B1. "Right Thurr" (remix featuring Jermaine Dupri and Trina) – 3:39

== Charts ==
=== Weekly charts ===
| Chart (2003) | Peak position |
|---|---|
| Australia (ARIA) | 6 |
| Australian Urban (ARIA) | 2 |
| Belgium (Ultratop 50 Flanders) | 30 |
| Belgium (Ultratip Bubbling Under Wallonia) | 7 |
| Canada (Nielsen SoundScan) | 11 |
| Denmark (Tracklisten) | 12 |
| France (SNEP) | 65 |
| Germany (GfK) | 42 |
| Ireland (IRMA) | 43 |
| Italy (FIMI) | 29 |
| Netherlands (Dutch Top 40) | 27 |
| Netherlands (Single Top 100) | 29 |
| New Zealand (Recorded Music NZ) | 1 |
| Norway (VG-lista) | 15 |
| Scottish Singles Sales (Official Charts) | 36 |
| Sweden (Sverigetopplistan) | 41 |
| Switzerland (Schweizer Hitparade) | 25 |
| UK Singles (Official Charts) | 17 |
| UK Hip Hop/R&B (Official Charts) | 6 |
| US Billboard Hot 100 | 2 |
| US Dance Airplay (Billboard) | 16 |
| US Hot R&B/Hip-Hop Songs (Billboard) | 2 |
| US Hot Rap Songs (Billboard) | 1 |
| US Pop Airplay (Billboard) | 5 |
| US Rhythmic Airplay (Billboard) | 1 |

=== Year-end charts ===
| Chart (2003) | Position |
|---|---|
| Australia (ARIA) | 51 |
| New Zealand (RIANZ) | 26 |
| UK Urban (Music Week) | 34 |
| US Billboard Hot 100 | 7 |
| US Hot R&B/Hip-Hop Singles & Tracks (Billboard) | 6 |
| US Hot Rap Tracks (Billboard) | 3 |
| US Mainstream Top 40 (Billboard) | 40 |
| US Rhythmic Top 40 (Billboard) | 1 |

=== Decade-end charts ===
| Chart (2000–2009) | Position |
|---|---|
| US Billboard Hot 100 | 72 |

== Certifications ==
| Region | Certification | Certified units/sales |
|---|---|---|
| Australia (ARIA) | Gold | 35,000^{^} |
| Canada (Music Canada) | Gold | 5,000^{^} |
| New Zealand (RMNZ) | 2× Platinum | 60,000^{‡} |
^{^} Shipments figures based on certification alone.^{‡} Sales+streaming figures based on certification alone.

== Release history ==
| Region | Date | Format(s) | Label(s) | Ref. |
|---|---|---|---|---|
| United States | April 14, 2003 | Urban radio | Capitol; Priority; Disturbing tha Peace | |
| United States | April 28, 2003 | Rhythmic contemporary radio | Capitol; Priority; Disturbing tha Peace | |
| United States | June 23, 2003 | Contemporary hit radio | Capitol; Priority; Disturbing tha Peace | |
| Australia | August 18, 2003 | CD | Capitol; Priority; Disturbing tha Peace | |
| United Kingdom | October 13, 2003 | 12-inch vinyl; CD | Capitol; Priority; Disturbing tha Peace | |

== In popular culture ==
- A modified version of the song was made by Chingy for the soundtrack to the video game NBA Live 2004.
- The song was used in the 2005 animated comedy film Robots, and was featured on the film's official soundtrack.

== See also ==
- List of number-one singles from the 2000s (New Zealand)
- List of Billboard number-one rap singles of the 2000s
