= Jackpot (Chingy album) =

Studio album by Chingy
- Released: July 15, 2003
- Genre: Hip-hop
- Length: 59:20
- Labels: Capitol; Disturbing Tha Peace; Trak Starz
- Producers: The Trak Starz; Da Quicksta

Chingy chronology
Jackpot (2003)	Powerballin' (2004)

Singles from Jackpot
- 1. "Right Thurr" Released: April 14, 2003; 2. "Holidae In" Released: August 25, 2003; 3. "One Call Away" Released: January 12, 2004

Jackpot is the debut studio album by American rapper Chingy. It was released on July 15, 2003, by Capitol Records, The Trak Starz's Trak Starz imprint, and Ludacris's Disturbing Tha Peace. Anchored by the smash single "Right Thurr", this album also had two other hits, "Holidae In" featuring Ludacris and Snoop Dogg, and "One Call Away" featuring J-Weav. The album was produced by the Trak Starz except for "Bagg Up", which was produced by Da Quiksta. The enhanced version of the album features the uncut video of "Right Thurr".

== Critical reception ==
Professional ratings
Review scores
Source	Rating
AllMusic	3/5 stars
The A.V. Club	Favorable
Robert Christgau	(choice cut)
Entertainment Weekly	C+
The Guardian	3/5 stars
HipHopDX	3.5/5 stars
PopMatters	Favorable
RapReviews	6/10
Rolling Stone	3/5 stars
Stylus Magazine	D

Jackpot received generally mixed reviews from music critics who drew comparisons to fellow St. Louis rapper Nelly. Roni Sarig of Rolling Stone praised the record for its mixture of different U.S. regions from hip-hop, concluding with, "Taken all together, Jackpot is short on depth, but it's a ride with some hitworthy moments and plenty of bounce." Steve 'Flash' Juon of RapReviews was mixed about the album, being ambivalent towards the Trak Starz's production and Chingy's skills as a rapper, saying "As a summer album, Chingy's "Jackpot" is a take it or leave it affair. It's relatively inoffensive, and certainly has some songs you'd want to play at a party, club or while driving around." Dorian Lynskey of The Guardian also saw the album's tropes and Chingy's use of Nelly's style.

Jason Birchmeier of AllMusic was also mixed towards the record, finding the hooks on the tracks not being on par with the beats and Chingy himself lacking substance in his rhymes. Joe Caramanica of Entertainment Weekly felt that Chingy paled in comparison to Nelly, despite having the same vocal tic as him, saying he has "only one gimmick, and while it charms on "Sample Dat Ass" and "One Call Away," most of Jackpot is as ephemeral as the winds blowing through the Arch." Robert Christgau cited "Chingy Jackpot" as a "choice cut", indicating a good song on "an album that isn't worth your time or money." Dom Passantino of Stylus Magazine gave a negative review, criticizing the production for having weak beats and found every other track "a failed second single." He also called out other critics' reviews for their so-called criticism of the album.

Billboard magazine ranked Jackpot at number 151 on the magazine's Top 200 Albums of the Decade.

== Commercial performance ==
Jackpot debuted at number two on the US Billboard 200 chart, selling 157,000 copies in its first week. In its second week, the album dropped to number six on the chart. In its third week, the album rose to number five on the chart, selling 77,000 copies. In its fourth week, the album remained at number five on the chart, selling 68,000 copies that week. On February 24, 2004, the album was certified Double Platinum by the Recording Industry Association of America (RIAA) for sales of over 2 million copies in the United States. As of August 2004, it had sold 2.8 million copies in the US.

== Track listing ==
Jackpot track listing
No.	Title	Writer(s)	Producer(s)	Length
1.	"Jackpot Intro"		The Trak Starz	0:22
2.	"He's Herre"	Alonzo Lee; Shamar Daugherty; Howard Bailey	The Trak Starz	3:02
3.	"Represent" (featuring Tity Boi and I-20)	Lee; Daugherty; Bailey; Tauheed Epps; Bobby Sandimanie	The Trak Starz	4:12
4.	"Right Thurr"	Lee Daugherty; Bailey	The Trak Starz	4:10
5.	"Jackpot the Pimp" (skit, not included on censored version)		The Trak Starz	1:07
6.	"Wurrs My Cash"	Lee Daugherty; Bailey	The Trak Starz	4:33
7.	"Chingy Jackpot"	Lee Daugherty; Bailey	The Trak Starz	4:08
8.	"Sample Dat Ass" (featuring Murphy Lee)	Lee Daugherty; Bailey; Torhi Harper	The Trak Starz	5:06
9.	"One Call Away" (featuring J-Weav)	Lee Daugherty; Bailey; Sedrick Martin	The Trak Starz	4:36
10.	"Dice Game" (skit, not included on censored version)		The Trak Starz	0:59
11.	"Gettin' It"	Lee Daugherty; Bailey	The Trak Starz	4:27
12.	"Holidae In" (featuring Ludacris and Snoop Dogg)	Lee Daugherty; Bailey; Christopher Bridges	The Trak Starz	5:14
13.	"Juice"	Lee Daugherty; Bailey	The Trak Starz	4:43
14.	"Fuck that Nigga" (skit, not included on censored version)		The Trak Starz	1:45
15.	"Madd @ Me"	Lee Daugherty; Bailey; Mason Betha; Charles Hugo; Pharrell Williams	The Trak Starz	3:53
16.	"Bagg Up"	Bailey; David Blake; Curtis Mayfield	Da Quicksta	3:21
Total length:				55:38

Bonus track
No.	Title	Writer(s)	Producer(s)	Length
17.	"Right Thurr" (remix featuring Jermaine Dupri and Trina)	Lee; Daugherty; Bailey; Jermaine Dupri	The Trak Starz	3:42
Total length:				59:20

CD + DVD bonus track (Japan version)
No.	Title	Producer(s)	Length
18.	"Mob Wit Me" (album version)	The Trak Starz	3:53
Total length:			63:13

Sample credits

- "Madd @ Me" contains resung elements from the composition "Lookin' at Me", written by Mason Betha, Charles Hugo, and Pharrell Williams.
- "Bagg Up" contains replayed elements of "Ain't Got Time", written by Curtis Mayfield.

== Charts ==
=== Weekly charts ===
Weekly chart performance for Jackpot
Chart (2003–2004)	Peak position
Australian Albums (ARIA)	36
Australian Urban Albums (ARIA)	7
Canadian Albums (Nielsen SoundScan)	41
Canadian R&B Albums (Nielsen SoundScan)	11
Dutch Albums (Album Top 100)	90
French Albums (SNEP)	65
German Albums (Offizielle Top 100)	42
Irish Albums (IRMA)	54
Italian Albums (FIMI)	70
New Zealand Albums (RMNZ)	17
Swiss Albums (Schweizer Hitparade)	36
UK Albums (Official Charts)	73
UK R&B Albums (Official Charts)	13
US Billboard 200	2
US Top R&B/Hip-Hop Albums (Billboard)	2

=== Year-end charts ===
Year-end chart performance for Jackpot
Chart (2003)	Position
US Billboard 200	48
US Top R&B/Hip-Hop Albums (Billboard)	17
Worldwide Albums (IFPI)	48
Chart (2004)	Position
US Billboard 200	37
US Top R&B/Hip-Hop Albums (Billboard)	23

== Certifications ==
Certifications for Jackpot
Region	Certification	Certified units/sales
Australia (ARIA)	Gold	35,000^{^}
Canada (Music Canada)	Gold	50,000^{^}
New Zealand (RMNZ)	Gold	7,500^{^}
United Kingdom (BPI)	Silver	60,000^{^}
United States (RIAA)	2× Platinum	2,000,000^{^}
^{^} Shipments figures based on certification alone.
