= Chingy =

American rapper (born 1980)

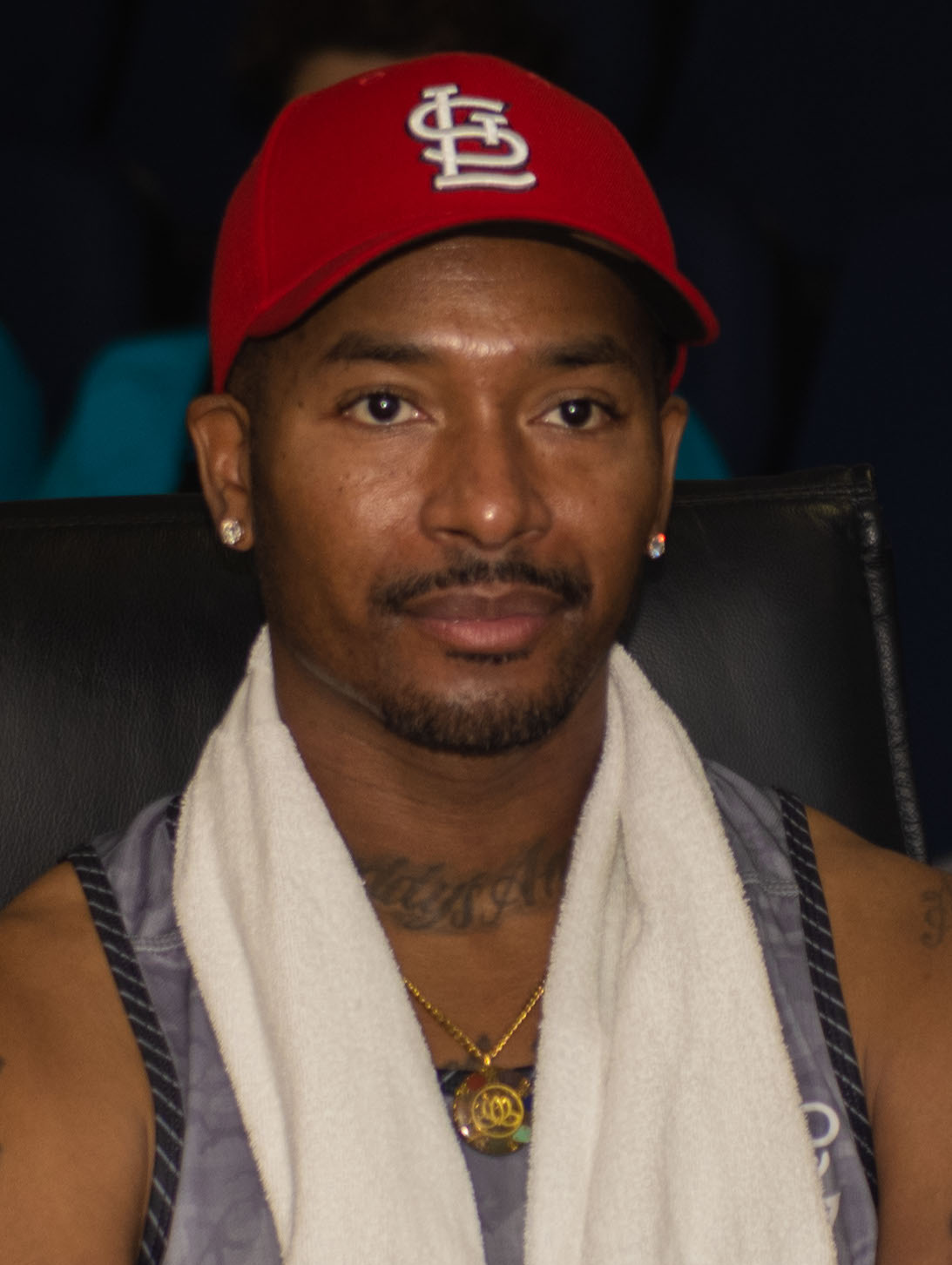
- Chingy in 2023

Background information
- Also known as: H Thugz
- Born: Howard Earl Bailey Jr. March 9, 1980 (age 46); St. Louis, Missouri, U.S.
- Genre: Southern hip-hop
- Occupations: Rapper; singer; songwriter
- Works: Chingy discography
- Years active: 2000–present
- Labels: Full Dekk; Real Talk; Bungalo; Trak Starz; Parlophone; Def Jam; Disturbing tha Peace; Priority; Capitol
- Website: chingy369.com

Howard Earl Bailey Jr. (born March 9, 1980), better known by his stage name Chingy, is an American rapper. Based in St. Louis, he toured as an opening act with fellow St. Louis rapper Nelly in 2002, and signed with fellow Southern rapper Ludacris' record label, Disturbing tha Peace (DTP), that same year. Released in a joint-venture with Capitol Records, his 2003 debut single, "Right Thurr", peaked at number two on the Billboard Hot 100. It preceded his debut studio album Jackpot (2003), which, despite mixed critical reception, peaked at number two on the Billboard 200. His second album, Powerballin' (2004), peaked at number ten on the chart, while his third album, Hoodstar (2006), peaked at number nine and spawned the Billboard Hot 100-top ten single, "Pullin' Me Back" (featuring Tyrese Gibson). His fourth album, Hate It or Love It (2007), witnessed a commercial decline and was preceded by the single "Fly Like Me" (featuring Amerie). His fifth album, Success & Failure (2010), failed to chart.

== Early life ==
Chingy grew up in Walnut Park East, St. Louis, Missouri; he has referred to the neighborhood as the "Bad Blocks."

He began writing lyrics when he was 9 and was recording raps at 10. He was originally known as H Thugz and was in the St. Louis group Without Warning on 49 Productions with M.G.D. & Mysphit. They recorded "What's Poppin Off" together, which became a local hit. H Thugz and Augustin also recorded a music video for the song. H Thugz later chose the alias Chingy, a slang term for money.

Chingy attended McCluer North High School in Florissant, Missouri which is a suburb of St. Louis. During high school, he was known to his friends as "Howie," and he continues to prefer that name from close friends and family.

== Career ==
=== 2002: Early career ===
Ludacris and his manager, Chaka Zulu, were quick to sign Chingy to their burgeoning Disturbing tha Peace label.

=== 2003–2005: Jackpot and Powerballin ===
Chingy's debut album Jackpot was released on July 15, 2003, on Disturbing tha Peace. Unable to secure a distribution deal through Def Jam, Ludacris negotiated a deal to distribute the album through Capitol Records. Guest appearances included Ludacris, Snoop Dogg, Murphy Lee, I-20, Raindrop, Tity Boi of Playaz Circle, Trina, and Jermaine Dupri. Fueled by "Right Thurr", Jackpot produced the hit "One Call Away" featuring J-Weav and "Holidae In" featuring Snoop Dogg and Ludacris. The album was produced by St. Louis production crew The Trak Starz. The album was received well by critics. Within a year of the release of Jackpot, It was certified Platinum by the RIAA. The up-tempo Southern hip-hop track "Right Thurr" gained popularity, peaking at number two on the Billboard Hot 100.

Chingy released his second album, Powerballin', on November 16, 2004, through Slot-A-Lot Records and Capitol Records. The album peaked at No. 10 on the chart and featured the hit single "Balla Baby." The album featured guest appearances from artists R. Kelly, Bun B, Lil Wayne, Lil Flip, Janet Jackson, David Banner, Nate Dogg, and Get It Boyz. Powerballin' sold over one million copies and received a Platinum certification by the RIAA on March 21, 2005. He also was on one of the George Lopez episodes as himself. The eighth song from his album "I Do" is featured on the soundtrack for the smash hit 2004 video game Need for Speed: Underground 2.

=== 2006–2008: Hood Star and Hate It or Love It ===
Hoodstar is Chingy's third album, released on September 19, 2006. The album featured Mr. Collipark, longtime collaborator Jermaine Dupri, Timbaland, and Mannie Fresh. His summer single, "Pullin Me Back" (featuring actor-R&B singer Tyrese), would find him back on top on the Hot Rap Tracks chart and help Hoodstar debut at number eight on the album chart, but the follow-up single "Dem Jeans", featuring Jermaine Dupri, fared worse although the album did go gold. Other singles from Hoodstar were "Brand New Kicks" and "Hands Up".

Unhappy with the way he felt Capitol was promoting their urban artists, in 2007 Chingy jumped ship and returned to DTP Records, which was by-then a part of the Def Jam family. When asked about the move, the St. Louis rapper said: "I don't think Capitol really knew how to work urban artists, They're really stuck on pop and they didn't know how to market me."

Hate It or Love It is Chingy's fourth studio album. The album featured production from Scott Storch, Timbaland, and Cool and Dre. The lead single is "Fly Like Me", featuring Amerie. The album was released on December 18, 2007, and featured appearances by Ludacris, Bobby Valentino, Steph Jones, Trey Songz, Rick Ross, and Anthony Hamilton. The album debuted at No. 84 on the Billboard 200, selling 30,000 copies, making it Chingy's first album not to crack the Top 10. Hate It or Love It was not released in the UK, marking Chingy's first album not to be released in the country.

=== 2009–2012: No Risk, No Reward ===
In 2012 Chingy announced he was working on his fifth studio album called No Risk No Reward, DTP which was set to be released sometime in 2012, but as of June 2016 continues to be delayed due to lack of funding. "Superhero", featuring Full Dekk Music Group's artist Chris Woodhouse, was purported to be the first single from the album. Chingy then announced that he would be releasing a mixtape, Jackpot Back, which was released March 3, 2012.

=== 2013–2016: "King Judah" and "Watch the World" ===
In Spring 2013, Chingy announced that he had become a practicing Black Hebrew Israelite and released the music video for "King Judah". It was Chingy's attempt to follow a moral agenda and denounce mainstream rap. Currently Chingy is working on his upcoming EP album entitled Chingology which was released later that year.

Major media outlets in Australia and NZ leaked information about a new Chingy collaboration, "Watch The World", featuring New Zealand based Asian model/singer Lucy X (Lucy Xu) . The track produced by ChristopherKris (Kris Lal) is rumored to be featured on an upcoming compilation album released in 2014. The single was released on November 1, 2013, to iTunes and radio. The song reached No. 2 on the iTunes Urban chart in both countries, with a video to follow in the coming months.

=== 2017–present: Signing to Bungalo Records ===
Chingy signed to Universal Music Group distributed label Bungalo Records; it was his third time recording under the Universal umbrella. In 2019, Chingy participated in the "Millennium Tour" with B2K.

In 2021, Chingy headlined a tour of the United States with R&B singers Mýa and Ginuwine.

=== Other ventures ===
==== Acting career ====
In 2005, Chingy made his acting debut in the TV comedy series My Wife and Kids. In the same year, Chingy acted in the TV comedies One on One and George Lopez. In 2006, Chingy made a cameo appearance in the comedy film Scary Movie 4, as well as on TV series Yo Momma. In 2010, Chingy had a role in the film Speed-Dating.

==== Cologne ====
In early 2022, he announced that his first cologne was being manufactured and packaged. He appeared on the online platform TalkShopLive in September 2022 to promote and officially sell the cologne for the first time.

== Controversy ==
=== Feud with Nelly ===
Despite opening for Nelly in 2002, Chingy had initially expressed discontent with the lack of promotion on the tour. Meanwhile, reports persisted that Nelly was increasingly irritated with Chingy's growth in fame particularly when he signed with Ludacris' DTP label shortly following the tour. Nelly claims he felt disrespected by Chingy's actions, claiming in a 2005 interview; "For him to say that 'Nelly and all them didn't take no part in him getting a deal', is like saying 'Run-DMC and them didn't take any part on me getting a deal', everybody that comes out tries to help the next motherfucker". Nelly subsequently dropped a verse on the song "Another One" on his 2004 album Sweat with a line in the song saying, "I like the way you do that right thurr [there]/You just remember why you do that right thurr, I made it tight to be country/They thought country was bummy/Till country start making money" which was perceived by Chingy as a diss track, though an interview with Nelly in December 2004 in which he believed the lyrics were taken out of context, later claiming: "I wasn't going at him. If you listen to the song, it says, 'I like the way you do that right thurr.' I could have said, 'Fuck the way you do that right thurr!' It ain't even like that." Angered by the song, Chingy leaked a song in response taking aim at Nelly entitled "We Got" on January 7, 2005. Later on in December 2005 at the Radio Music Awards in Las Vegas, Chingy alleges he approached Nelly to end the feud but claims he was ignored. However; months later Chingy would approach Nelly's cousin who allowed both rappers to put an end to the feud in 2006. During an interview in November 2022; Chingy would also claim Nelly's sister had also approached him at an airport, diligent for both to resolve the feud prior to her death due to cancer complications in March 2005, claiming "At that point, she said she had a wish, and that wish was for me and him to come together... When I heard that, I had to end this; for her. This can't go on. She had a wish for this to happen, she really wanted me and her brother to be cool."

=== Log Cabin Republicans concert ===
Log Cabin Republicans, a Republican LGBTQ organization, held a "Red White & Rock concert" in support of the Donald Trump 2024 presidential campaign on September 29, 2024. The concert's lineup was announced on September 20, 2024, with Chingy scheduled to perform. After a large social media backlash, he responded posting: "My job is to perform and get paid to perform, not caurr [sic] about politics." Two days later, he announced that he would drop out of the concert.

== Discography ==
- Jackpot (2003)
- Powerballin' (2004)
- Hoodstar (2006)
- Hate It or Love It (2007)
- Success & Failure (2010)

== Filmography ==
=== Film ===
Year	Name	Role
2003	Fromage 2003	Himself
2004	The Industry	Himself
2005	Robots	DJ Robot
2005	Letter to the President	Himself
2005	Beef lll	Himself
2006	The System Within	Nick
2006	Scary Movie 4	Himself
2007	Heckler	Himself
2008	Psycho	Pizza Man
2010	Speed-Dating	Kenneth
2010	Polish Bar	Fat Moe

=== Television ===
Year	Name	Role
2005	George Lopez	Himself
2005	One on One	Taz
2005	Punk'd	Himself
2006	Yo Momma	Himself
2009	Caramel	Kyle
2013	Couples Therapy: Season 3	Himself
