= GhettoMusick =

2003 song by Outkast

Single by Outkast

from the album Speakerboxxx/The Love Below
- A-side: "Prototype"; "She Lives in My Lap"
- B-side: "Spread"; "Unhappy"
- Released: July 15, 2003
- Studio: Stankonia (Atlanta)
- Genre: Electroclash; electro-funk; hip hop; soul; techno
- Length: 3:56
- Label: Arista; LaFace
- Songwriters: André Benjamin; Antwan Patton; Kenneth Gamble; Bunny Sigler
- Producer: André 3000

Outkast singles chronology
"Land of a Million Drums" (2002)	"GhettoMusick" (2003)	"Hey Ya!" (2003)

Alternative cover
- Double A-side single with "Prototype"

Music video
- "GhettoMusick" on YouTube

"GhettoMusick" is a song recorded by American duo Outkast for their fifth studio album Speakerboxxx/The Love Below (2003). While it was included on Big Boi's disc Speakerboxxx, the song features vocals from André 3000, its sole producer, as well. It was written by the duo alongside Kenneth Gamble and Bunny Sigler, who are credited due to the song containing excerpts from their composition "Love, Need and Want You", performed by Patti LaBelle. The up-tempo track amasses an array of musical styles, including electroclash, electro-funk, hip hop, soul and techno. Lyrically, it confronts contemporary rappers for their lack of ambition and competence. The song was released as the lead single from Speakerboxxx/The Love Below on July 15, 2003, by Arista Records and LaFace Records.

"GhettoMusick" received critical acclaim upon the release of Speakerboxxx/The Love Below, with several critics highlighting it as one of the record's standout tracks. Due to its limited commercial release and lackluster airplay, it peaked only at number 93 on the US Hot R&B/Hip-Hop Songs. Internationally, it charted within the lower regions in Australia and the United Kingdom. In select countries, it was released as a double A-side single with The Love Below track "Prototype" in November 2004. The Bryan Barber-directed accompanying music video for "GhettoMusick" depicts Big Boi as a courier and satirizes the Southern culture; LaBelle also appears in the video. Outkast initially performed the song at several award shows in 2004, and subsequently during their 2014 reunion tour.

== Writing and recording ==
Following the end of promotional activities in support of their widely successful fourth studio album Stankonia (2000), Outkast embarked on a brief hiatus, during which both André 3000 and Big Boi intended to record their respective solo albums. However, their management concluded it was unsuitable for the two to release their individual efforts at the time, thus it was decided the two records would be integrated into a single double album, titled Speakerboxxx/The Love Below. Due to André 3000's prolonged recording process for The Love Below, Big Boi grew impatient and considered releasing Speakerboxxx as a standalone solo album, as originally conceived; his plans did not come into fruition and the records were released as a double album.

"GhettoMusick", like the entirety of the album, was recorded at Outkast's own Stankonia Recording Studios in Atlanta. Despite André 3000 and Big Boi recording separately, they still collaborated on several tracks, including "GhettoMusick", which they wrote together. Although included on Big Boi's Speakerboxxx, the song also features vocals from André 3000, who solely produced it. As the song incorporates a sample from Patti LaBelle's 1983 recording "Love, Need and Want You", its writers Kenneth Gamble and Bunny Sigler received a songwriting credit on "GhettoMusick".

== Music and lyrics ==
"GhettoMusick" is a heavily up-tempo track infused with triple-time rhythms. Its musical style was classified as "Basement Jaxx-ish electroclash" by Uncut, while several journalists categorized it under electro-funk, electronic hip hop and techno. The eclectic styles are juxtaposed with recurring excerpts from Patti LaBelle's "Love, Need and Want You", which exhibit LaBelle's vocals against a "lascivious" soul background; Dorian Lynskey from The Guardian described the song's sound as "flipping between hooligan, rave-style electronics and deep-pile soul". Writing for MTV News, Shaheem Reid described "GhettoMusick" as an "intense, fluently moving track sound[ing] like the lovechild of Miami bass, bounce and electronic". In addition, several critics sonically compared it to Outkast's 2000 song "B.O.B".

While Big Boi's rap was labeled "machine-gun-speed" by Will Hermes from Entertainment Weekly, Nick Southall from Stylus Magazine described André 3000's vocal performance as "helium-soaked". Lyrically, "GhettoMusick" confronts contemporary rappers for their lack of ambition and competence, further criticizing the contemporary hip hop scene as a whole. Brent DiCrescenzo from Pitchfork described it as "emotionally, a celebration and a lament, braggadocio and beatitudes. Musically, the record shifts from punk-cadenced, cellulite-quivering woofer booms to three-wheeled slow-jams and back before snake-charming with George Clinton keyboards."

== Critical reception ==
"GhettoMusick" garnered substantially commendatory reviews from music critics upon the release of Speakerboxxx/The Love Below. Matt Dentler from The Austin Chronicle called it "a lock down on the sad state of affairs that hip-hop's most flammable duo has found the rap game in since returning from their three-year hiatus". Billboard contributor Rashaun Hall labeled the track "ultra-funky", further describing it as a "sonic gem that is part electro-funk, part R&B slow jam". Daily Bruin and Uncut singled the song out as the album's standout track; the former attributed their choice to the "sound of urgency found not only in the socialization of ghetto politics and identity, but also in the pure strength of the beat". The Independent compared its "tricksy rhythms, treated R&B vocals, oddball sleazy humour and bizarre stylistic shifts" to the artistry of American rock band The Mothers of Invention. Shaheem Reid from MTV commended André 3000's production and Big Boi's lyricism on the track. Brent DiCrescenzo from Pitchfork listed it among the album's highlights and praised its "earthshaking" nature. In Rolling Stone, Jon Caramanica wrote the track "resembles the fight song of an Afro-psychedelic superhero" and placed it among the instrumental highlights of Big Boi's Speakerboxxx, which he credited to André 3000's production. Nick Southall from Stylus Magazine also highlighted the song in his review of Speakerboxxx/The Love Below, calling it "outrageous".

Critical acclaim for "GhettoMusick" persevered with retrospective commentaries. On the website Albumism, Patrick Corcoran wrote the track was a "brainstorming start" to Speakerboxxx, further praising the interspersing of the excerpts from "Love, Need and Want You" and Big Boi's lyricism. Stephen Thomas Erlewine of AllMusic complimented its position as the opening track of Speakerboxxx/The Love Below, writing: "From the moment Speakerboxxx kicks into gear with "GhettoMusick" and its relentless blend of old-school 808s and breakneck breakbeats, it's clear that Boi is ignoring boundaries, and the rest of his album follows suit." Zach Schonfeld from Consequence classified the song among "the funkiest and most progressive-minded hip-hop of Big Boi’s career". In Dazed, Gabriel Szatan described it as an "armour-plated riot vehicle", adding that it contributed to the album acting as "a Rosetta Stone for the preceding half-century of contemporary music". Alexis Petridis included "GhettoMusick" in his ranking of Outkast's best songs for The Guardian, calling it a "vertiginous" highlight of its parent album and commending its "ferocious, distorted synths, frantic beats and soul interludes". In their listing, The Ringer called the song a "tour de force of instrumentation, soul, and lyrics" and "another prime example that the group that never followed the rules invented some new ones themselves".

== Music video ==
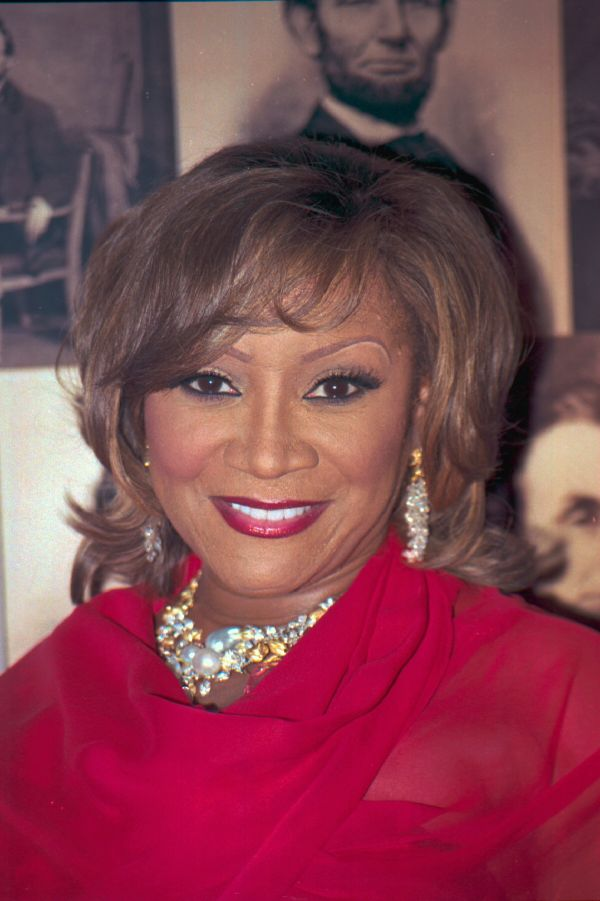
Patti LaBelle makes an appearance in the music video for "GhettoMusick".

In August 2003, MTV News reported Outkast had planned to film accompanying music videos for "GhettoMusick" and "She Lives in My Lap"–which had been released as a limited double A-side single–simultaneously, but postponed both in favor of subsequent singles "Hey Ya!" and "The Way You Move". While the music video for "She Lives in My Lap" was eventually cancelled, the Bryan Barber-directed music video for "GhettoMusick" was filmed in September 2004. The video depicts Big Boi during his daily routine as "Delivery Boi" for FedUp–a parody of FedEx–and features appearances from André 3000, Goodie Mob, Patti LaBelle and Lil Jon. Big Boi is shown eating lunch at LaBelle's house and delivering packages to a group of gang members he evades a fight with, an attractive woman who tries to seduce him before her husband arrives with a bat, and a sorority house. Humorously themed, it satirizes the Southern culture with fictional exaggerations, such as a "Fish and Grits" restaurant.

== Live performances ==
In 2004, Outkast performed "GhettoMusick" on several televised occasions throughout the promotional cycle for Speakerboxxx/The Love Below. The song was performed as part of a medley with "Prototype", "The Way You Move" and "Hey Ya!" at the 2004 MTV Video Music Awards on August 29; Outkast won the most awards of the ceremony. Big Boi performed the track with Patti LaBelle at the 2004 World Music Awards on September 15, where Outkast also led with won awards. The duo included the song on the set list for their 2014 reunion tour, which visited 40 festivals across the world, including Coachella, Wireless Festival, Fuji Rock Festival and Way Out West.

== Track listings and formats ==
US 12-inch vinyl

1. "GhettoMusick" (radio edit) – 3:56
2. "GhettoMusick" (club mix) – 3:56
3. "GhettoMusick" (instrumental) – 3:57
4. "She Lives in My Lap" (radio edit) (featuring Rosario Dawson) – 4:28
5. "She Lives in My Lap" (instrumental) – 4:28

UK CD single

1. "GhettoMusick" (radio mix) – 3:56
2. "GhettoMusick" (Benny Benassi club mix) – 6:00

Australian and European maxi CD single

1. "GhettoMusick" – 3:59
2. "Prototype" – 5:28
3. "Spread" – 3:54
4. "Unhappy" – 3:19

European 12-inch vinyl

1. "Prototype" – 5:28
2. "GhettoMusick" – 3:59
3. "Unhappy" – 3:19
4. "Prototype" (instrumental) – 5:28

European CD single

1. "Prototype" – 5:28
2. "GhettoMusick" – 3:59

== Credits and personnel ==
Credits are adapted from the liner notes of Speakerboxxx/The Love Below.

- Vincent Alexander – engineering assistance
- André 3000 – keyboards, lead vocals, production, songwriting
- Big Boi – lead vocals, songwriting
- Warren Bletcher – engineering assistance, mixing assistance
- Myrna "Skreechy Peachy" Crenshaw – backing vocals
- John Frye – engineering, mixing
- Joi – backing vocals
- Kenneth Gamble – songwriting
- Moka Nagatani – engineering
- Marvin "Chanz" Parkman – organ
- Bunny Sigler – songwriting
- Sleepy Brown – backing vocals

== Charts ==
2003–2004 weekly chart performance (Note: In Australia, "GhettoMusick" charted alongside "Prototype".)
Chart	Peak position
Australia (ARIA)	43
Scotland Singles (OCC)	70
UK Singles (OCC)	55
UK Hip Hop/R&B (OCC)	15
US Hot R&B/Hip-Hop Songs (Billboard)	93

== Release history ==
Release dates and formats (Note: "GhettoMusick" was released as a double A-side single with "She Lives in My Lap" in the United States, and with "Prototype" in Australia and France.)
Region	Date	Format(s)	Label(s)	Ref.
United States	July 15, 2003	12-inch vinyl	Arista	
United Kingdom	September 22, 2003	CD	LaFace	
France	November 8, 2004	Maxi CD	Arista	
Australia	November 22, 2004	Maxi CD	Sony BMG	
United States	November 22, 2004	Rhythmic contemporary radio	LaFace	
United States	November 29, 2004	Urban contemporary radio	LaFace	
