= List of UK R&B Singles Chart number ones of 2004 =

The UK R&B Chart is a weekly chart that ranks the 40 biggest-selling singles and albums that are classified in the R&B genre in the United Kingdom. The chart is compiled by the Official Charts Company, and is based on physical and other physical formats. This is a list of the United Kingdom's biggest R&B hits of 2004.

== Number ones ==
Key
†	Best-selling R&B single of the year

Issue date	Single	Artist
4 January	"Shut Up"	The Black Eyed Peas
11 January	"Milkshake"	Kelis
18 January	"Milkshake"	Kelis
25 January	"Milkshake"	Kelis
1 February	"Milkshake"	Kelis
8 February	"Milkshake"	Kelis
15 February	"Milkshake"	Kelis
22 February	"Hey Ya!"	Outkast
29 February	"Thank You"	Jamelia
7 March	"Thank You"	Jamelia
14 March	"Baby I Love U!"	Jennifer Lopez
21 March	"Yeah!" †	Usher featuring Lil Jon and Ludacris
28 March	"Yeah!" †	Usher featuring Lil Jon and Ludacris
4 April	"Yeah!" †	Usher featuring Lil Jon and Ludacris
11 April	"Yeah!" †	Usher featuring Lil Jon and Ludacris
18 April	"My Band"	D12
25 April	"My Band"	D12
2 May	"Fit But You Know It"	The Streets
9 May	"Dip It Low"	Christina Milian featuring Fabolous
16 May	"Dip It Low"	Christina Milian featuring Fabolous
23 May	"Hotel"	Cassidy featuring R. Kelly
30 May	"Trick Me"	Kelis
6 June	"I Don't Wanna Know"	Mario Winans featuring Enya and P.Diddy
13 June	"I Don't Wanna Know"	Mario Winans featuring Enya and P.Diddy
20 June	"I Don't Wanna Know"	Mario Winans featuring Enya and P.Diddy
27 June	"I Don't Wanna Know"	Mario Winans featuring Enya and P.Diddy
4 July	"Burn"	Usher
11 July	"Burn"	Usher
18 July	"Tipsy"	J-Kwon
25 July	"Dry Your Eyes"	The Streets
1 August	"Dry Your Eyes"	The Streets
8 August	"Dry Your Eyes"	The Streets
15 August	"Dry Your Eyes"	The Streets
22 August	"Guns Don't Kill People Rappers Do"	Goldie Lookin Chain
29 August	"Dumb"	The 411
5 September	"My Place"	Nelly
12 September	"My Place"	Nelly
19 September	"My Place"	Nelly
26 September	"My Place"	Nelly
3 October	"My Place"	Nelly
10 October	"Whatever U Want"	Christina Milian featuring Joe Budden
17 October	"Afrodisiac"	Brandy
24 October	"Millionaire"	Kelis featuring André 3000
31 October	"Wonderful"	Ja Rule featuring Ashanti and R. Kelly
7 November	"Lose My Breath"	Destiny's Child
14 November	"Lose My Breath"	Destiny's Child
21 November	"Lose My Breath"	Destiny's Child
28 November	"Lose My Breath"	Destiny's Child
5 December	"You Can Do It"	Ice Cube featuring Mack 10 and Ms. Toi
12 December	"You Can Do It"	Ice Cube featuring Mack 10 and Ms. Toi
19 December	"You Can Do It"	Ice Cube featuring Mack 10 and Ms. Toi
26 December	"You Can Do It"	Ice Cube featuring Mack 10 and Ms. Toi

== See also ==
- List of UK Dance Singles Chart number ones of 2004
- List of UK Independent Singles Chart number ones of 2004
- List of UK Singles Downloads Chart number ones of the 2000s
- List of UK Rock & Metal Singles Chart number ones of 2004
- List of UK R&B Albums Chart number ones of 2004
