= Prototype (song) =

2004 single by Outkast

Single by Outkast

from the album Speakerboxxx/The Love Below
- A-side: "GhettoMusick"
- B-side: "Spread"; "Unhappy"
- Released: September 27, 2004
- Studio: Stankonia (Atlanta, Georgia); Tree Sound (Atlanta, Georgia)
- Genre: Funk; neo soul
- Length: 5:26
- Label: LaFace; Arista
- Songwriter: André Benjamin
- Producer: André 3000

Outkast singles chronology
"Roses" (2004)	"Prototype" (2004)	"Mighty O" (2006)

Music video
- "Prototype" on YouTube

"Prototype" is a song recorded by American duo Outkast for their fifth studio album Speakerboxxx/The Love Below (2003). It was written, produced and performed by André 3000, and was included on his disc The Love Below. A mid-tempo ballad, the track fuses funk and neo soul styles against a guitar-driven instrumentation. Lyrically a love song, it is an ode to its protagonist's love interest. The song was released as the fifth and final single from Speakerboxxx/The Love Below on September 27, 2004, by Arista Records and LaFace Records.

"Prototype" received critical acclaim, predominantly directed towards its instrumentation and sonic quality, both upon the release of Speakerboxxx/The Love Below and in retrospective commentaries. While it peaked only at number 63 on the US Hot R&B/Hip-Hop Songs, it reached the top 20 in Finland. In select countries, it was released as a double A-side single with Speakerboxxx track "GhettoMusick". The song's accompanying music video, directed by André 3000 himself, depicts him as an interstellar traveler who lands on Earth and falls in love with a woman. To promote the song, Outkast performed it live at the 2004 MTV Video Music Awards, and later included it on the set list for their 2014 reunion tour.

== Writing and recording ==
Following the end of promotional activities in support of their widely successful fourth studio album Stankonia (2000), Outkast embarked on a brief hiatus. André 3000 initially pursued an acting career, to little success, and began recording a solo effort. Feeling discontented with hip hop, he started writing pop, funk and jazz-oriented songs incorporating singing and playing instruments, with a restrict on rapping. Their lyrical themes revolved around finding love, reflecting his personal life following the end of his relationship with Erykah Badu. André 3000 used a microcassette record to document his "melodic ideas and lyrics, then build the melody around the lyrics", and began recording at his Los Angeles home instead of a recording studio, as he wanted to record alone and without any feedback. He solely wrote and produced majority of the songs, including "Prototype". After recording four or five songs, he informed Big Boi of his plans. Big Boi also intended to record his solo album; however, their management concluded it was unsuitable for the two to release their individual efforts at the time, thus it was decided the two records would be integrated into a single double album, titled Speakerboxxx/The Love Below. Big Boi swiftly completed Speakerboxxx, whereas André 3000 prolonged the recording process for The Love Below. As the entirety of Speakerboxxx was recorded at Outkast's own Stankonia Recording Studios in Atlanta, André 3000 moved his sessions there as well, thus "Prototype" was partly recorded there and partly at the Tree Sound Studios, also in Atlanta.

== Music and lyrics ==
"Prototype" is composed in the key of A major, according to the sheet music published at Musicnotes.com by BMG Rights Management. The Ringer described the song as a "slow-churning ballad driven by a gurgling bass line and André 3000’s deft touch". Multiple journalists defined it as a funk track, while Jon O'Brien from The Recording Academy described its musical style as "celestial neo soul". Uncut compared the guitar-driven instrumentation to The Style Council and the song's poignant nature to Chic's "At Last I Am Free". Its tempo is a moderate 90 beats per minute in common time, while André 3000's vocal range spans around one and a half octave from the low note of E_{4} to the high note of A_{5}. His vocal performance received comparisons to Prince, Sly Stone and George Clinton. Lyrically a love song, the track is a "hyperbolic yet grounded" ode to its protagonist's love interest, with lines such as "I hope that you're the one / If not, you are the prototype / We'll tiptoe to the sun / And do thangs I know you like".

== Critical reception ==
"Prototype" received widespread acclaim from music critics, both upon the release of Speakerboxxx/The Love Below and in retrospective commentaries. Matt Dentler from The Austin Chronicle called the song "brilliant" and listed it among the album's highlights. In Stylus Magazine, Nick Southall wrote the track was one of "the best things Outkast have ever recorded", describing it as "blissful Prince slink". Uncut declared it "[t]he album's most starkly beautiful track", further describing it as "desperately gorgeous". As part of their ranking of Outkast's best songs, Fact labeled the song "most laidback number" from The Love Below, elaborating: "With touches of studio serendipity – the guitar solo, the coos of a woman, his ad-lib about ad-libs – it's a sorbet-like palette-cleanser for the album that follows." Kim Hu from Complex called it one of André 3000's "sexiest" singles and his vocal performance "sensual". Justin Charity of the same publication wrote the song gives "Prince a run for Andre's advance". Stereo Williams from The Daily Beast described it as "a lilting ballad featuring 3000 cooing uncertain and lovelorn lyrics over smooth guitar lines". The Ringer included the track on their listing of Outkast's best songs, calling it "a transportive jaunt that feels more than it sounds", commending its lyrical content and integration of funk and hip hop styles.

== Music video ==
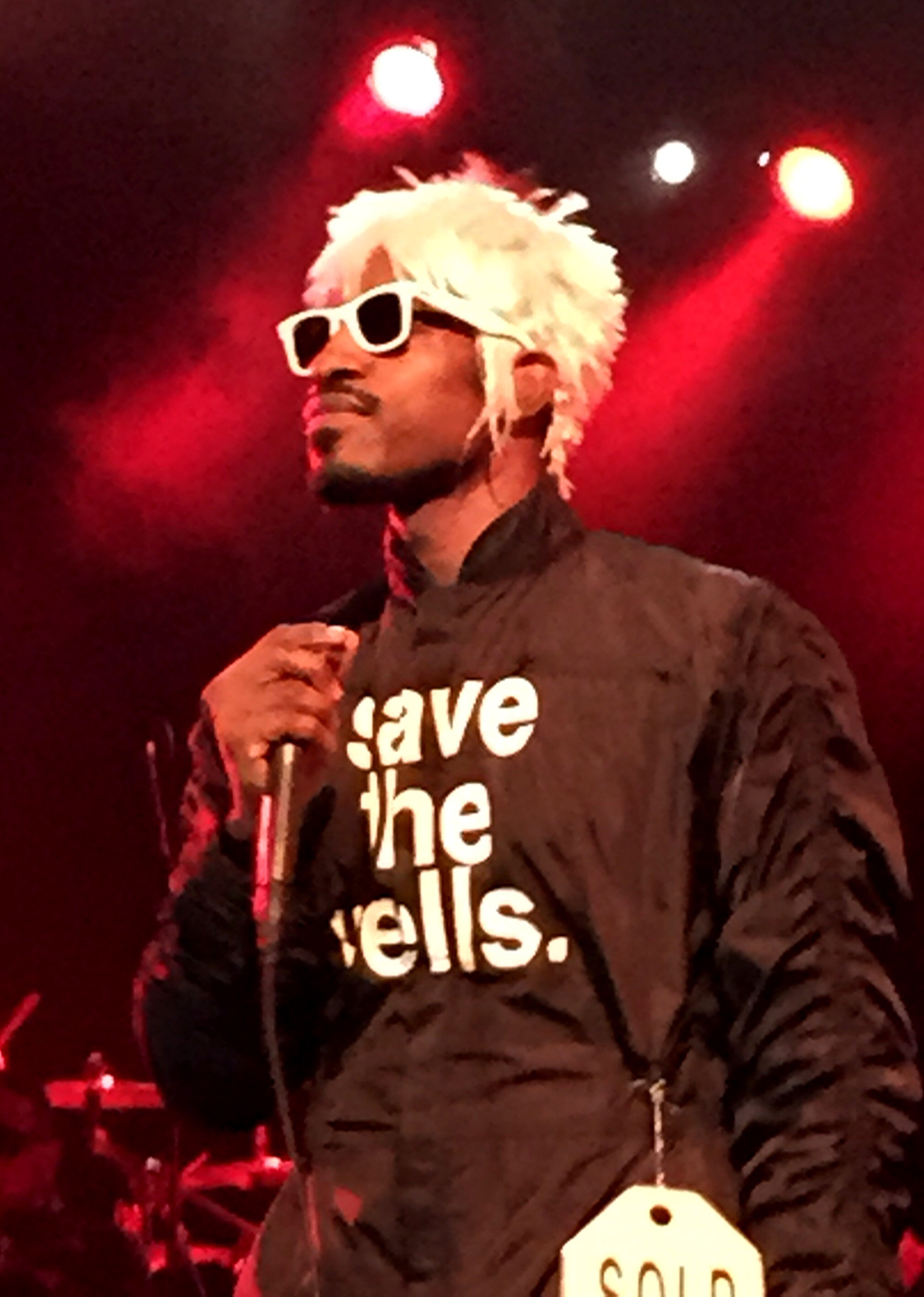
The music video for "Prototype" marked André 3000's directorial debut. In the video, he is shown wearing a white wig similar to the one pictured.

"If M. Night Shyamalan had a wife who wrote romance novels, this would be it. I'd like to make a love video that is as hauntingly beautiful as the track itself. So rather than try to tell some disingenuous love story about an ordinary man and woman, I'd like, instead, to set our narrative in a tableau of magic realism."

–André 3000's treatment for the music video for "Prototype".

The accompanying music video for "Prototype", an homage to Sun Ra's movie Space Is the Place, marked André 3000's directorial debut and was filmed during the weekend of July 30–August 1, 2004. It depicts him as a member of an extraterrestrial family, all wearing white wigs and futuristic clothing, descending to Earth from a fictional planet Proto and landing in an "idyllic" rural area. As they are exiting their spacecraft, a woman (portrayed by model and actress Michelle Van Der Water) photographs them. They intercept her and, after realizing they are harmless, she introduces various Earthly creations and practices to them. She and André 3000 soon fall in love. As they kiss, she instantly becomes pregnant with his child–similar to the 1984 science fiction romance drama film Starman. The following morning, André 3000 decides to stay on Earth and be a father as his family departs back to Proto. The video premiered via Total Request Live on September 8. In an analysis of Outkast's incorporation of outer space-related themes in their artistry for Dazed, Lexi Manatakis described the video as "a sonic and visual study of the acceptance and love of otherness through a cosmic lens, speaking to OutKast's Afrofuturistic vision of how the world could be united as one. It also offers an alternative vision to traditional tropes of science fiction: in OutKast's world, space is not a place of loneliness or isolation, but a place of love, acceptance, and equality for all."

== Live performances ==
To promote "Prototype", Outkast performed it as part of a medley with "GhettoMusick", "The Way You Move" and "Hey Ya!" at the 2004 MTV Video Music Awards on August 29, 2004; they won the most awards of the ceremony. The duo included the song on the set list for their 2014 reunion tour, which visited 40 festivals across the world, including Coachella, Wireless Festival, Fuji Rock Festival and Way Out West.

== Track listings and formats ==
Australian and European maxi CD single

1. "GhettoMusick" – 3:59
2. "Prototype" – 5:28
3. "Spread" – 3:54
4. "Unhappy" – 3:19

European 12-inch vinyl

1. "Prototype" – 5:28
2. "GhettoMusick" – 3:59
3. "Unhappy" – 3:19
4. "Prototype" (instrumental) – 5:28

European CD single

1. "Prototype" – 5:28
2. "GhettoMusick" – 3:59

== Credits and personnel ==
Credits are adapted from the liner notes of Speakerboxxx/The Love Below.

- André 3000 – guitar, lead vocals, production, songwriting
- Warren Bletcher – engineering assistance
- John Frisbee – acting direction
- John Frye – engineering, pre-mixing
- Kevin Kendricks – keyboards
- Aaron Mills – bass
- Neal Pogue – mixing
- Alex Reverberi – mixing assistance
- Matt Still – engineering
- Marianne Lee Stitt – acting

== Charts ==
2004–2005 weekly chart performance
Chart (2004–2005)	Peak position
Australia (ARIA) with "GhettoMusick"	43
Finland (Suomen virallinen lista)	15
Germany (GfK)	85
US Hot R&B/Hip-Hop Songs (Billboard)	63

== Certifications ==
Certifications and sales
Region	Certification	Certified units/sales
United States (RIAA)	Gold	500,000^{‡}
^{‡} Sales+streaming figures based on certification alone.

== Release history ==
Release dates and formats
Region	Date	Format(s)	Label(s)	Ref.
United States	September 27, 2004	Rhythmic contemporary radio; urban contemporary radio	LaFace	
France (Note: "Prototype" was released as a double A-side single with "GhettoMusick" in Australia and France.)	November 8, 2004	Maxi CD	Arista	
Australia	November 22, 2004	Maxi CD	Sony BMG	
