= Speakerboxxx/The Love Below =

Studio album by Outkast
- Released: September 23, 2003
- Recorded: 2002–2003
- Studios: Enterprise (Burbank); Larrabee (Los Angeles); Ocean Way (Los Angeles); Stankonia (Atlanta); Tree Sound (Atlanta); ZAC (Atlanta)
- Genres: Southern hip-hop; progressive rap; funk; jazz; pop; progressive soul; psychedelia
- Length: 134:49
- Label: Arista
- Producers: André 3000; Big Boi; Carl Mo; Cutmaster Swiff; Dojo5; Mr. DJ

Outkast chronology
Big Boi and Dre Present... Outkast (2001)	Speakerboxxx/The Love Below (2003)	Idlewild (2006)

Singles from Speakerboxxx/The Love Below
- 1. "GhettoMusick" Released: July 15, 2003 (Note: "GhettoMusick" was originally released as a double A-side single with "She Lives in My Lap" on July 15, 2003, and was the lead single from Speakerboxxx/The Love Below in the US and the UK. In other countries, it was released as the fourth and final single alongside "Prototype" in November 2004.); 2. "Hey Ya!" Released: August 25, 2003; 3. "The Way You Move" Released: August 25, 2003; 4. "Roses" Released: March 1, 2004; 5. "Prototype" Released: September 27, 2004

Speakerboxxx/The Love Below is the fifth studio album by the American hip-hop duo Outkast. It was released on September 23, 2003, by Arista Records. Issued as a double album, its length of over two hours is spread across solo records by Big Boi and André 3000.

Originally conceived as standalone albums, the members' solo efforts were integrated into a double album under Outkast's name as Arista deemed the decision to release solo albums unsuitable at the time. Big Boi's Speakerboxxx is a Southern hip-hop and progressive rap album influenced by Parliament-Funkadelic, while André 3000's The Love Below largely departs from hip-hop in favor of pop, funk, jazz, psychedelia, and progressive soul styles, drawing inspiration from Prince. While The Love Below was entirely produced by André 3000, Speakerboxxx featured contributions from André 3000, Mr. DJ, Carl Mo, Cutmaster Swift, and Dojo5, in addition to production by Big Boi. Lyrically, Speakerboxxx discusses socially conscious themes, such as single parenthood, philosophy, religion, and politics, whereas The Love Below is centered on complexities related to love and relationships. Speakerboxxx/The Love Below features a multifaceted array of collaborators, including Sleepy Brown, Killer Mike, Ludacris, Jay-Z, Rosario Dawson, Kelis, and Norah Jones.

Speakerboxxx/The Love Below received widespread acclaim from music critics, who praised the consistency of Big Boi's Speakerboxxx and the eclectic musical style of André 3000's The Love Below. Numerous publications proclaimed the album as one of the best records of 2003, placing it atop their year-end listings. A commercial success, Speakerboxxx/The Love Below became Outkast's first number-one album on the US Billboard 200, with first-week sales of 509,000 units, and went on to be certified diamond by the Recording Industry Association of America (RIAA) in December 2004. (Note: For multi-disc albums whose total length exceeds 120 minutes, the RIAA counts each disc as a separate unit. Hence, Speakerboxxx/The Love Below was certified diamond after shipping five million units in the US, rather than the standard 10 million.) At the 46th Annual Grammy Awards (2004), the album won Album of the Year and Best Rap Album, becoming only the second hip hop album ever to win the former. It produced five singles, two of which—"Hey Ya!" and "The Way You Move"—topped the US Billboard Hot 100, and made Outkast the first duo in the chart's history to replace themselves at the summit. Furthermore, "Hey Ya!" won the Grammy Award for Best Urban/Alternative Performance. "Roses" reached the top 10 on the Billboard Hot 100 as well, peaking at number nine, while "GhettoMusick" and "Prototype" failed to achieve substantial success.

Outkast heavily promoted Speakerboxxx/The Love Below via interviews and televised performances, often separately, as the album was marketed as a consolidation of Big Boi and André 3000's solo records. The strategy elicited intense media speculation over the duo's disbandment, which the members consistently denied. The musical film Idlewild was originally slated to accompany the album, but was postponed multiple times before being released in 2006, after which Outkast embarked on an extended hiatus. Consequently, a multitude of critics have recognized Speakerboxxx/The Love Below as a signal of Outkast's cessation, but nonetheless hailed the album as one of the best recordings of its era. The album has been further credited for reviving the double album concept in hip-hop, as well as for popularizing conscious hip-hop. Following its RIAA certification update to 13-times platinum in 2023, signifying double-disc units of 6.5 million in the US, Speakerboxxx/The Love Below became the highest-certified rap album of all time. As of September 2023, it has sold over 11 million copies worldwide.

== Recording and production ==
Following Outkast's first Grammy Award win at the 44th Annual Grammy Awards (2002), André 3000 felt urged to do something different from his previous projects and moved to Los Angeles to pursue an acting career. He was relatively unsuccessful, landing a minor role in Hollywood Homicide (2003) and a one-episode appearance in the drama series The Shield. He subsequently returned to music, and began developing a solo album different from Outkast's work. The output was a blend of pop, jazz and funk infused with live instruments, and with a larger emphasis on singing than rapping. When writing songs, he used a microcassette recorder in order to "record melodic ideas and lyrics, then build the melody around the lyrics". He began recording The Love Below at his Los Angeles residence, using Pro Tools software, in addition to a drum machine, keyboards and various synthesizers. He enjoyed the atmosphere of recording at home instead of a studio, telling XXL: "It didn't start in the studio because if you have a bunch of people around, they're coming from the party and I'm in there singing falsetto... those vibes didn't match." His initial sessions were hampered by his inexperience with Pro Tools and, unaware of how to edit his recordings, he opted to record songs such as "Pink & Blue" entirely in one take. Other gear used included an Avalon VT737 SP, as well as AD2055 EQ and AD2044 compressors for his vocals.

After creating four to five songs, he informed Big Boi of the project. Big Boi had already recorded some songs before André 3000 contacted him, but after their conversation he decided his next project would be Speakerboxxx. Describing his approach in the studio, Big Boi later commented to XXL: "I had a complete vision of what an album could be that was entirely me, and the idea was just to keep it funky, keep it jamming, it's always bass-heavy. And lyricism, it's all about lyrics, taking pride in your pen and your pad." His favorite song to record was "Unhappy". He spent several days working on its hook before driving to his mother's home and playing the song in her driveway, to which she responded enthusiastically. At some point in the recording, the project moved to Outkast's own Stankonia Studios in downtown Atlanta, which had been used to record its namesake Stankonia (2000). Studio manager and an engineer John Frye would later recognize that much of the media scrutiny surrounding the album's recording was concerned with André 3000 and Big Boi's working relationship and their decision to record separately. He conceded that both enjoyed working solo and were doing so more frequently, but continued to share and critique each other's works.

Speakerboxxx and The Love Below were originally conceived as individual solo efforts. However, Outkast's management deemed the decision unsuitable, as Arista Records sought to capitalize on the momentum caused by the duo's then-recent Grammy Award victory. In a compromise, André 3000 and Big Boi integrated their solo records into a single double album, which they envisioned as their film's accompanying soundtrack album. Production of the film was put on hold, and the album was reconstructed into their fifth studio effort. In order to accurately display the postponed film's plot on audio recordings, background noise such as footsteps and car door slamming were interpolated into the album's tracks. As he finished Speakerboxxx earlier than André 3000 completed The Love Below, Big Boi grew impatient due to André 3000's prolonged recording process, and once again considered releasing Speakerboxxx as a standalone solo album. While the entirety of Speakerboxxx was recorded at the Stankonia Studios, a substantial portion of The Love Below was also recorded at other locations, such as the Larrabee Sound Studios and Ocean Way Recording in Los Angeles, and the Tree Sound Studios in Atlanta. Frye noted the end of the recording sessions for The Love Below as particularly stressful for André 3000, whom he described as drained from working at four studios simultaneously. In total, an estimated 120 songs were recorded for Speakerboxxx/The Love Below. One of the songs which did not make the final track listing was "Millionaire", André 3000's second collaboration with Kelis, which was instead included on her third studio album Tasty (2003) and subsequently released as a single. Meanwhile, the original track listing for Speakerboxxx, published before The Love Below was completed, included "Oh No", featuring Bubba Sparxxx and BackBone; "Do Dirty", featuring Killer Mike; "808", featuring Bun B; and "Rats & Roaches", a collaborative effort between Big Boi and André 3000.

== Music and lyrics ==
Speakerboxxx/The Love Below is a 135-minute double album comprising a total of 40 tracks, including 11 interludes. It is a concept album with the intention of each disc showcasing each member's individual perspective and musical style. Big Boi's Speakerboxxx is an experimental Southern hip hop and progressive rap record with lyrical themes such as single parenthood, philosophy, religion, and politics. Brett Schewitz of Rolling Stone noted musical influences from Parliament-Funkadelic, while independent critic Roni Sarig observed the emotional range in Big Boi's lyricism as wider on Speakerboxxx than on its predecessors. After a "gunshot beat"-paced intro, the disc opens with "GhettoMusick". The track's eclectic musical style, encompassing electroclash, electro-funk, hip hop, and techno, is juxtaposed with recurring excerpts from Patti LaBelle's 1983 song "Love, Need and Want You", which exhibit LaBelle's vocals against a "lascivious" soul background. Lyrically, it displays Big Boi confronting lackluster contemporary rappers and criticizing the hip hop scene's perceived descent. According to Brent DiCrescenzo of Pitchfork, "Unhappy" musically conveys Big Boi effectively asserting himself as simultaneously traditional and perverse. The big band, horn-driven funk track "Bowtie" was described as reminiscent of George Clinton and Cotton Club. It lyrically details stylishly dressing for a night out, and features Sleepy Brown and Jazze Pha. Brown is also featured on "The Way You Move", a Latin-influenced R&B song pairing a "Dirty South synth-drum bounce with a faux Phil Collins hook".

Mariachi-tinged hip hop track "The Rooster" discusses Big Boi's struggles as a single parent, against an instrumentation based on "slippery" horns and loose wah-wah guitars. Killer Mike-assisted collaboration "Bust" blends hip hop with nu metal, and lyrically expresses a desire for superirority. On the psychedelic soul track "War", Big Boi refers to the 2000 United States presidential election, War in Afghanistan, murder of Daniel Pearl, Iraq War, Black Panther Party, and Post-9/11. "Church" is a lyrical critique of organized religion. A techno-gospel song, it has received comparisons to Stevie Wonder's 1970s recordings. The interlude "Bamboo"—titled after Big Boi's son, who makes a guest appearance, covering "The Whole World"—precedes "Tomb of the Boom". Both tracks use an identical "bouncy" beat, while the latter dismisses rumors about Outkast's disbandment, and features Konkrete, Big Gipp, and Ludacris. "Knowing" discusses a prostitute's plight, while "Flip Flop Rock" is an ode to flip-flops. Featuring Killer Mike and Jay-Z, "Flip Flop Rock" is a hip hop track built on a "springy" guitar loop and a "beatific" piano, while incorporating scratches and propulsive kickdrums. "Interlude", a spoken word evaluation of Outkast's history, precedes the percussion-infused "Reset", which features Khujo and CeeLo Green. Comedian Henry Welch performs the brief interlude "D-Boi", while Slimm Calhoun, Lil Jon & The East Side Boyz, and Mello appear on "Last Call", a track accentuated with aggressive horns and an eccentric theremin. Speakerboxxx closes with a 35-second reprise of "Bowtie", on which Big Boi's vocals are altered with helium.

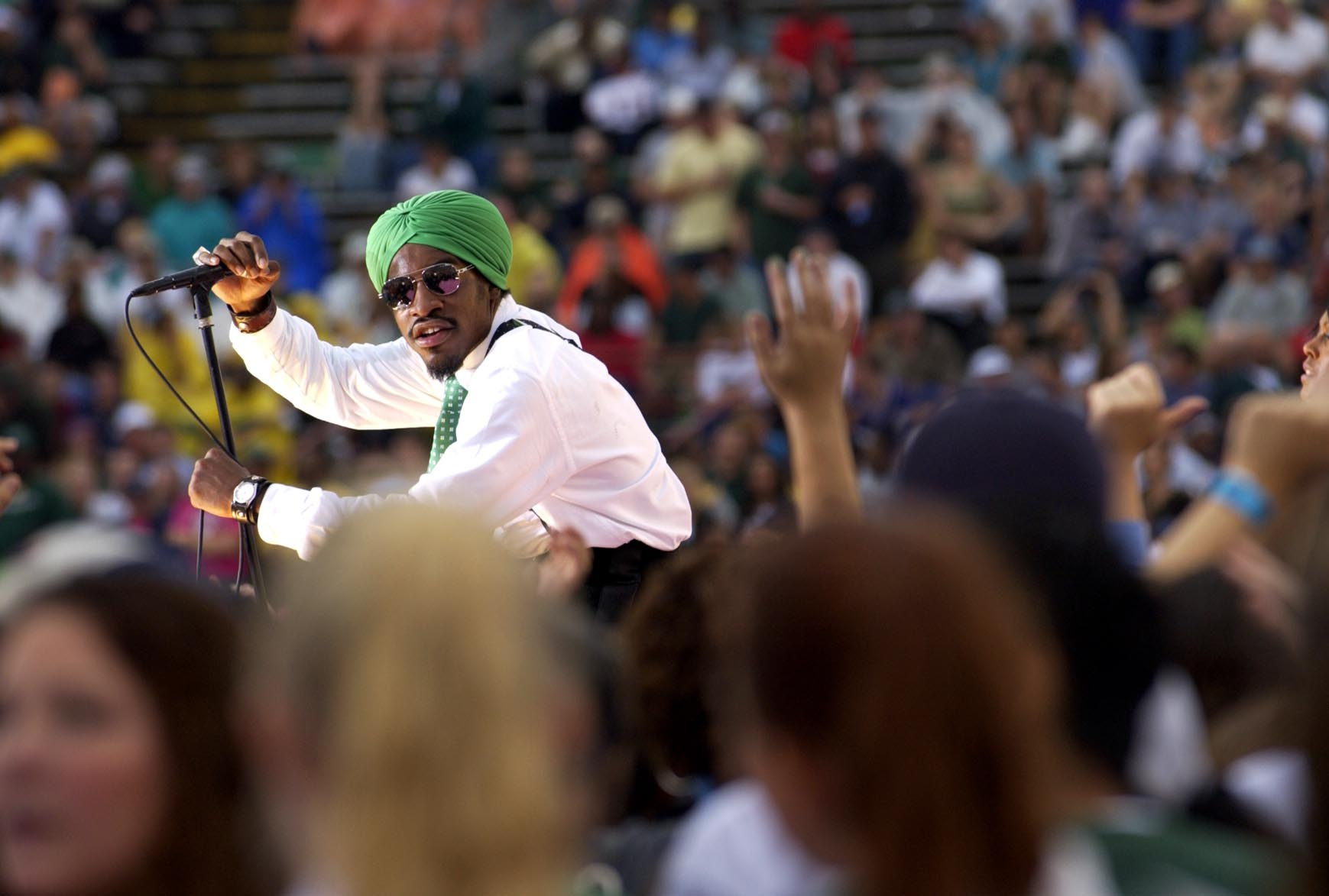
André 3000 performing "Hey Ya!" at the Tad Gormley Stadium in October 2003

In contrast with Speakerboxxx, André 3000's The Love Below was identified as a funk, jazz, pop, psychedelic, and progressive soul record comparable to the music of Prince in critical commentaries. The disc's abounding theme is love, specifically falling in love and self-love. Sarig suggested that the end of André 3000's relationship with Erykah Badu influenced much of the lyrical content, which he saw as concerned with the search for true love. André 3000's vocal performance on the string-driven intro was compared to Frank Sinatra by Andy Gill of The Independent, while on the noise rock-lounge opener "Love Hater", it was described as "mock crooning" by Stephen Thomas Erlewine. The interlude "God" finds André 3000 embracing his "horndog" reputation in a prayer, accompanied by an acoustic guitar. "Happy Valentine's Day" introduces his alter ego Cupid Valentino, a reimagination of Cupid as a "gun-toting thug". Anal sex-themed "Spread" displays trumpets and piano interspersed with a pliant bassline and scattering rimshots. Prelude "Where Are My Panties?", featuring Toni Hunter, insinuates a one-night stand leading to a romantic relationship. The lyrical theme continues on "Prototype", a funk-neo soul ballad sung similarly to Prince, Clinton, and Sly Stone. Alternative R&B track "She Lives in My Lap", featuring spoken-word vocals from actress Rosario Dawson, received further comparisons to Prince, as Erlewine compared the song to Prince and the Revolution's 1985 B-side "She's Always in My Hair".

Acoustic guitar and synth-bass-driven "Hey Ya!" fuses power pop, traditional soul and electro-funk styles. Lyrically an "ass-shaking jam session", it introduces André 3000's second alter ego Ice Cold, who instructs the listeners to "shake it like a Polaroid picture". André 3000 described the song as being "pretty much about the state of relationships in the 2000s. It's about some people who stay together in relationships because of tradition, because somebody told them, 'You guys are supposed to stay together.' But you pretty much end up being unhappy for the rest of your life." "Roses", the sole song on The Love Below on which Big Boi appears, is a diss track directed towards a conceited ex-girlfriend referred to as "Caroline". "Pink & Blue" contains samples of Aaliyah's 1994 song "Age Ain't Nothing but a Number" and reverses its lyrical theme, being directed towards an older love interest rather than a younger one. A "Goth-soul cha-cha" track, "Pink & Blue" ends with a brief orchestrated outro. While "Love in War" is André 3000's lyrical response to Big Boi's "War", the frivolous, falsetto-sung minimalist electro track "She's Alive" discusses single motherhood. "Dracula's Wedding" follows André 3000 as a vampire infatuated with another vampire, portrayed by Kelis, but fearing commitment. "My Favorite Things" is a drum and bass rendition of the 1959 song of the same title from The Sound of Music. Norah Jones is featured on "Take Off Your Cool", a string-driven acoustic jazz-soul track. On "Vibrate", André 3000 uses pro-environmental metaphors for masturbation. The dub-jazz track is built on muted trumpets and backward drumbeats. The Love Below closes with "A Life in the Day of Benjamin André (Incomplete)", described as an "autobiographical epistolary".

== Marketing ==
=== Imagery ===
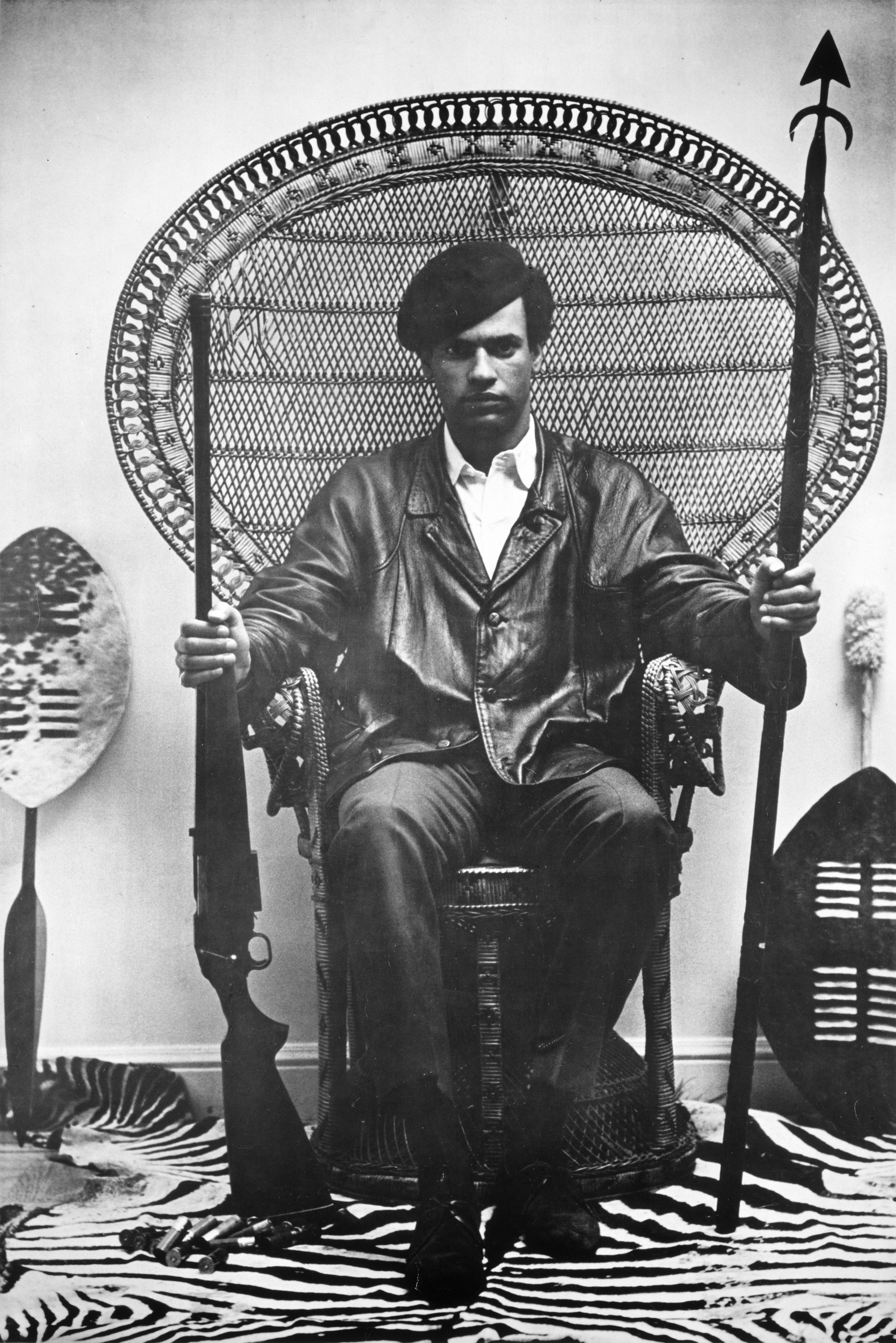
Cover artwork for Big Boi's Speakerboxxx was inspired by a 1967 photograph of African American revolutionary Huey P. Newton.

For the album cover and accompanying imagery for Speakerboxxx/The Love Below, Big Boi and André 3000 were photographed separately, due to rising creative differences between the two, following prior disagreements over their imagery. Big Boi was photographed by longtime collaborator Jonathan Mannion, while Torkil Gudnason photographed André 3000. After listening to the entirety of Speakerboxxx, Mannion devised ideas for imagery based on the record's lyrical themes. Meanwhile, Gudnason had a more fashion-oriented approach towards his photo shoot.

The selected cover for Speakerboxxx saw Big Boi dressed in a fur coat and baggy jeans, depicting the fictional procurer named Rooster, who frequently appears on the album. He is shown sitting on a feather duster-decorated rattan chair, inspired by a photograph of Huey P. Newton published in The Black Panther dated November 23, 1967. On the cover of The Love Below, André 3000 is shown posing with a gun and portraying Cupid Valentino, one of his alter egos present on the album. Brandon Soderberg of Spin retrospectively credited André 3000's flamboyant appearance on the artwork for inspiring rappers such as Kanye West, Lil B, and Cam'ron to embrace more feminine clothing styles, in contrast with rap's "normative masculinity".

On CD pressings of Speakerboxxx/The Love Below, Big Boi's image was used as the front cover, while André 3000's cover was placed in the back. However, for digital editions and vinyl pressings, the images were juxtaposed into a single cover, with Speakerboxxx on the left and The Love Below on the right. Furthermore, the liner notes were divided into two segments, one for each record, with separate imagery.

=== Release and promotion ===
Originally titled Outkast Present... Big Boi and Dre—in reference to Outkast's compilation album Big Boi and Dre Present... Outkast (2001)—Speakerboxxx/The Love Below was scheduled for late May 2003, before being postponed to August 19. It was ultimately released on September 23, 2003, by Arista Records. As it was marketed as a double album comprising Big Boi and André 3000's solo discs, Outkast also promoted the album individually, arriving separately to 2003 MTV Video Music Awards on August 28 and staging separate performances and interviews. The strategy elicited intense media speculation over their disbandment, which the members consistently denied. In subsequent months, Outkast appeared on covers of The Source, The Fader, Entertainment Weekly, Vibe, Complex, Rolling Stone, and Q. On October 31, 2003, they performed together on Total Request Live, before performing on Saturday Night Live the following day, at the 2003 American Music Awards on November 16, and at the VH1 Big in '03 Awards on November 20.

André 3000's solo performance of "Hey Ya!" at the 46th Annual Grammy Awards on February 8, 2004, ignited controversy, as its imagery was described as "racist" and disrespectful towards Native American culture. He subsequently performed the song at the 2004 Kids' Choice Awards on April 3. Outkast performed together at the 2004 MTV Video Music Awards Japan on May 23; Big Boi held solo concerts at the Shinkiba Studio Coast in Tokyo the following day, and at the launch of Calvin Klein's fragrance Eternity Moment in New York City on June 3. The duo performed "Roses" at the BET Awards 2004 on June 29, and a medley of "The Way You Move", "Hey Ya!", "GhettoMusick" and "Prototype" at the 2004 MTV Video Music Awards on August 29. André 3000 then performed at Fashion Rocks on September 8, while Big Boi performed "GhettoMusick" with Patti LaBelle at the 2004 World Music Awards on September 15. In September 2023, Speakerboxxx/The Love Below was reissued on two limited-edition vinyl pressings, in commemoration of its 20th anniversary.

== Singles ==
In March 2003, MTV News reported "Church" and "Prototype" would be simultaneously released as the lead single from Speakerboxxx/The Love Below, and would be accompanied by a Bryan Barber-directed 30-minute short film comprising both songs' music videos; however, those plans never came to fruition. Instead, "GhettoMusick" was released as the lead single on July 15, 2003, as a double A-side single with "She Lives in My Lap". However, the promotion of the single was soon halted as Outkast focused on subsequent singles "Hey Ya!" and "The Way You Move", hence "GhettoMusick" peaked only at number 93 on the Hot R&B/Hip-Hop Songs. In select countries, the song was released as the album's double A-side fourth and final single alongside "Prototype" in November 2004. Upon its re-release, an accompanying music video for "GhettoMusick" was filmed; directed by Barber, it satirically depicts Big Boi as a "Delivery Boi" for FedUp, and features appearances from Patti LaBelle and Lil Jon.

"Hey Ya!" and "The Way You Move" were released as the second and third (Note: Numerous publications, and the members themselves, have referred to "Hey Ya!" and "The Way You Move" as lead singles from Speakerboxxx/The Love Below due to their immense success. "Hey Ya!" acted as the lead single in all countries except for the US and the UK, while "The Way You Move" was separately released as the second single.) singles on August 25, 2003. "Hey Ya!" was the first to reach the summit on the US Billboard Hot 100, where it spent nine consecutive weeks, eight of which "The Way You Move" spent at number two, before reaching the top for one week. Thus, Outkast became the first duo in the chart's history to replace itself at the summit. Internationally, "Hey Ya!" reached the top 10 in numerous countries, as well as number one in Australia, Canada, the Czech Republic, Norway, and Sweden, while "The Way You Move" peaked within the top 10 in Australia, Croatia, Denmark, Hungary, New Zealand, and the UK. At the 46th Annual Grammy Awards, "Hey Ya!" won Best Urban/Alternative Performance, and was nominated for Record of the Year. Barber directed both songs' accompanying music videos, which were produced to appear in sequence as a long-form video. "Hey Ya!" shows André 3000 portraying all eight members of the fictional band The Love Below performing to a rapturous crowd in London, to recreate The Beatles' first appearance on The Ed Sullivan Show, while "The Way You Move" depicts Big Boi and Sleepy Brown in a garage specializing in Speakerboxxx audio systems, before the setting is transformed into a lavish party. At the 2004 MTV Video Music Awards, "Hey Ya!" won four awards, including Video of the Year; it had also been nominated for Best Short Form Music Video at the 46th Annual Grammy Awards.

"Roses" was released as the fourth single from Speakerboxxx/The Love Below on March 1, 2004. It became their third consecutive top-10 single on the US Billboard Hot 100, peaking at number nine. The song fared similarly internationally, reaching the top 10 in Australia, Canada, Ireland, New Zealand, Norway, and the UK. Its accompanying music video, Outkast's sixth consecutive to be directed by Barber, is a contemporary adaptation of the musical West Side Story, and depicts the rivalry between two high school crews—The Love Below, led by André 3000, and Speakerboxxx, led by Big Boi—as they battle for fictional Caroline's attention. The video was nominated for The Michael Jackson Award for Best R&B/Soul or Rap Music Video at the 2005 Soul Train Music Awards. "Prototype" was released as the fifth and final single from Speakerboxxx/The Love Below on September 27, 2004, and was released as a double A-side single with "GhettoMusick" internationally. Like "GhettoMusick", "Prototype" failed to enter the US Billboard Hot 100, peaking at number 63 on the Hot R&B/Hip-Hop Songs. The music video for "Prototype" marked André 3000's directorial debut, and depicts him as an extraterrestrial family member, who falls in love with a woman after descending to Earth.

== Critical reception ==
Professional ratings
Aggregate scores
Source	Rating
Metacritic	91/100
Review scores
Source	Rating
AllMusic	4.5/5 stars
Blender	5/5 stars
Entertainment Weekly	A
The Guardian	5/5 stars
The Independent	5/5 stars
Los Angeles Times	4/4 stars
NME	8/10
Pitchfork	8.0/10
Rolling Stone	3/5 stars
The Village Voice	A−

According to the review aggregator Metacritic, Speakerboxxx/The Love Below received "universal acclaim" based on a weighted average score of 91 out of 100 from 26 critic scores. Reviewing for AllMusic, Stephen Thomas Erlewine called both discs "visionary, imaginative listens, providing some of the best music of 2003, regardless of genre". He credited Speakerboxxx with "reclaiming the adventurous spirit of the golden age and pushing it into a new era", while referring to The Love Below as "the great lost Prince album." Will Hermes wrote in Entertainment Weekly that the album's "ambition flies so far beyond that of anyone doing rap right now (or pop, or rock, or R&B)". Kris Ex wrote for Blender that the double album "holds an explosion of creativity that couldn't have been contained in just one LP", while writing for Los Angeles Times: "It's not just that the collection stands so far above much of today's contemporary hip-hop and R&B; but that it surpasses the high level of genre-defying craftsmanship that the duo has cultivated for nearly a decade." The Guardian's Dorian Lynskey described both discs as "sublime ... hip-hop's Sign o' the Times or The White Album: a career-defining masterpiece of breathtaking ambition". According to Andy Gill of The Independent, Speakerboxxx/The Love Below set "a new benchmark not just for hip hop, but for pop in general", featuring "so many musical tributaries coursing into both Big Boi's progressive-rap pyrotechnics and Dre's freaky jazz-funk love odyssey that even their old tag of 'psychedelic hip-hop soul' starts to look restrictive". Stylus Magazine's Nick Southall called the album "a series of spectacular moments and memorable events". John Mulvey of NME described its two discs as "two Technicolor explosions of creativity that people will be exploring, analysing and partying to for years". Sal Cinquemani from Slant Magazine wrote that it is "greater than the sum of its parts, and this kind of expertly crafted pop and deftly executed funk rarely happen at the same time—not since Stankonia, at least."

In his review of Speakerboxxx/The Love Below for Rolling Stone, Jon Caramanica was less enthusiastic, particularly about André 3000 expressing his "right to be peculiar in a hip-hop context". Matt Dentler from The Austin Chronicle stated that Outkast performed stronger as a duo than individually, explaining: "It's like Lennon and McCartney solo albums: plenty of solid tunes, but the pen held together is mightier than a solo sword." Pitchfork's Brent DiCrescenzo wrote that The Love Below does not sustain "consistent brilliance and emotional complexity throughout" like Speakerboxxx. Ethan Brown from New York shared those sentiments, elaborating: "Big Boi's Speakerboxxx is bolder—he wants to go where most hip-hoppers fear to tread and take the MTV audience along with him. It strikes at the essence of what has made OutKast so important to pop: the accessible, democratic nature of its strangeness." In The Village Voice, Robert Christgau said the record could have been "the classic P-Funk rip it ain't quite" had Speakerboxxx alone been issued with "Roses", "Spread", "Hey Ya!", and "an oddity of [André 3000's] choosing". He nonetheless commended what he described as "commercial ebullience, creative confidence, and wretched excess, blessed excess, impressive excess". On the contrary, Matt Harvey of BBC praised both counterparts, describing Speakerboxxx/The Love Below as "hilarious and thought provoking, goes on for hours (without ever getting boring) and is the most ambitious piece of pop [of 2003]". In The Rolling Stone Album Guide (2004), Roni Sarig wrote that "for sheer breadth, ambition, and musical vision, there's little doubt Speakerboxxx/The Love Below is a classic."

== Accolades ==
=== Listings ===
Listings
Year	Publication	List	Position	Ref.
2003	Associated Press	The Top 10 Albums of 2003	2	
2003	The A.V. Club	Keith Phipps' Best Albums of 2003	8	
2003	The A.V. Club	Nathan Rabin's Best Albums of 2003	6	
2003	The Face	Recordings of the Year	6	
2003	The Morning News	The Top 10 Albums of 2003	4	
2003	NME	Albums of the Year	8	
2003	Pitchfork	Top 50 Albums of 2003	22	
2003	Spin	The 40 Best Albums of 2003	2	
2003	The Village Voice	Pazz & Jop	1	
2003	The Wire	Rewind	21	
2007	Rock and Roll Hall of Fame	Definitive 200	29	
2009	Consequence of Sound	The Top 100 Albums of the 2000s	99	
2009	MTV Base	Greatest Albums Ever	31	
2009	Newsweek	Best Albums of the Decade	1	
2009	NME	The Top 100 Greatest Albums of the Decade	44	
2010	1001 Albums You Must Hear Before You Die		–	
2011	Rolling Stone	100 Best Albums of the 2000s	34	
2012	Complex	25 Rap Albums from the Past Decade That Deserve Classic Status	–	
2013	NME	The 500 Greatest Albums of All Time	183	
2019	The Guardian	The 100 Best Albums of the 21st Century	23	
2023	Rolling Stone	The 500 Greatest Albums of All Time	290	
2023	Uproxx	The Best Albums of 2003, Ranked (20 Years Later)	5	

=== Awards and nominations ===
Critically acclaimed, Speakerboxxx/The Love Below was nominated for a myriad of industry awards. At the 46th Annual Grammy Awards on February 8, 2004, it won Album of the Year, the most prestigious Grammy Award, and Best Rap Album. Outkast thus became only the second rap artists to win Album of the Year, after Lauryn Hill in 1999. Geoff Boucher from Los Angeles Times declared the album "the first pure hip-hop project" to win the award. While accepting the Best Rap Album award, André 3000 said: "Thank you", showed the V sign, and left the stage. Carena Liptak of The Recording Academy retrospectively called the acceptance speech "perhaps the shortest" in the history of Grammy Awards. Speakerboxxx/The Love Below also won Best Album of the Year at the 2004 Soul Train Music Awards, and Favorite Rap/Hip-Hop Album at the American Music Awards of 2004. Internationally, Speakerboxx/The Love Below won Album of the Year at the 2004 MTV Video Music Awards Japan, while being nominated for the Brit Award for International Album in both 2004 and 2005, and for Best Album at the 2004 MTV Europe Music Awards.

== Commercial performance ==
In the US, Speakerboxxx/The Love Below debuted atop the Billboard 200 chart dated October 11, 2003, with first-week sales of 509,600 copies. Following three consecutive number-two debuts, the album became Outkast's first number-one on the Billboard 200, and registered their second-highest first-week sales, after Stankonia. Furthermore, it became their second number-one album on the Top R&B/Hip-Hop Albums. In its second week, Speakerboxxx/The Love Below sold 235,000 additional copies, remaining atop the Billboard 200, before descending to number two the following week. During its first month, the album sold over one million units. It returned to the summit in its sixth week, having spent the prior three weeks within the top four. During the Christmas week of 2003, Speakerboxxx/The Love Below sold 374,000 copies, rising back to the summit, where it stayed for three additional weeks throughout January–February 2004. In total, the album spent seven non-consecutive weeks at number one, and 56 weeks charting. On December 3, 2004, the Recording Industry Association of America (RIAA) certified Speakerboxxx/The Love Below diamond, denoting shipments of five million double-disc units in the US. By March 2012, the album had sold 5,702,000 copies in the country. Shortly after the album's 20th anniversary, the RIAA certification was updated to 13-times platinum on September 29, 2023, signifying 13 million album-equivalent units; (Note: The units comprise pure album sales, song downloads and streaming equivalents of 6,500,000. For multi-disc albums whose total length exceeds 120 minutes, the RIAA counts each disc as a separate unit, which doubles the amount of Speakerboxxx/The Love Below units eligible for a certification.) Speakerboxxx/The Love Below thus became the highest-certified rap album of all time.

In Canada, Speakerboxxx/The Love Below debuted at number six on the Canadian Albums Chart dated October 11, 2003, and was certified gold by the Canadian Recording Industry Association (CRIA) in its first week. It subsequently peaked at number four on the Canadian Albums Chart on February 14, 2004. In the UK, the album was a sleeper hit, debuting at number 44 on the UK Albums Chart before peaking at number eight in its 16th week, as well as peaking atop the UK R&B Albums Chart in its 15th week. It was certified triple platinum by the British Phonographic Industry (BPI) in July 2023, denoting album-equivalent units of 900,000. Across Europe, Speakerboxxx/The Love Below reached the top five in Ireland and Norway, and number six on the European Top 100 Albums, while reaching the top 20 in Denmark, Finland, France, the Netherlands, Sweden, and Switzerland. In June 2004, the International Federation of the Phonographic Industry (IFPI) certified the album platinum, for sales of one million units in Europe. The album was also a commercial success across Oceania, peaking at numbers nine and three in Australia and New Zealand, respectively, and being certified double platinum in both countries. According to IFPI, Speakerboxxx/The Love Below was the 11th best-selling album worldwide of 2003. As of September 2023, it has sold over 11 million copies worldwide.

== Legacy ==
"Speakerboxxx/The Love Below ended up a downpayment on a future they couldn't sustain. Previously launched by their ineffable chemistry as MCs, overlapping and interlocking with a slick balance of world-weary caution and gallivanting abandon, Speakerboxxx/The Love Below was, for all its deserved success, the visible end of that dynamic. Upon reaching the top of pop's Mount Olympus, a cruel twist occurred. The whole world was finally listening, but OutKast ran out of things to say."

— Gabriel Szatan of Dazed reflecting on the aftermath of Speakerboxxx/The Love Below.

Despite initial scepticism from both the industry analysts and Arista Records over the performance of Speakerboxxx/The Love Below due to its double album conceptualization, the album achieved immense commercial and critical success. Jon O'Brien from The Recording Academy declared it one of the most influential double albums in hip hop, crediting the album for reviving the concept pioneered by 2Pac's All Eyez on Me (1996), The Notorious B.I.G.'s Life After Death (1997), and Wu-Tang Clan's Wu-Tang Forever (1997). O'Brien further emphasized the influence of Speakerboxxx/The Love Below on subsequent hip hop double albums, such as Street's Disciple (2004) by Nas, UGK's Underground Kingz (2007), Drake's Scorpion (2018), and Kendrick Lamar's Mr. Morale & the Big Steppers (2022). Thematically, Speakerboxxx/The Love Below has been credited with propelling conscious hip hop into the mainstream throughout the mid-2000s, alongside recordings by Kanye West and Jadakiss. Chris DeVille wrote for Stereogum that The Love Below was sonically "an attempt at the kind of funkadelic genre mash Janelle Monáe successfully pulled off with The Electric Lady 10 years later." Gabriel Szatan of Dazed praised Speakerboxxx/The Love Below for expanding the horizons of artistic expression within hip hop, elaborating: "For a relatively young and exceedingly creative genre, big league hip hop was also pretty conservative in its accepted conventions in the 90s and early 00s. OutKast permanently stretched those boundaries, showing eccentricity should be cherished. Nowhere was that done more gleefully than on their flawed, frantic yet furiously fun final masterpiece." Erika Marie from HotNewHipHop commended Outkast's choice of collaborators, which ensured the album to be "a cohesive masterpiece rather than a disjointed collection", adding that the collaborators were vital in creating an "epitome of excellence" in hip hop's history.

Upon its release, Speakerboxxx/The Love Below was frequently compared to The Beatles' 1968 eponymous double album in critical commentaries, with Outkast labeled the contemporary Lennon–McCartney. In an analysis of the comparisons for Consequence, Zach Schonfeld wrote that Speakerboxxx/The Love Below captured the duo's "creative divorcing", drawing a parallel with the conflicts surrounding The Beatles, which arose from the members' pre-disbandment creative differences. Although both he and Big Boi were insistent on denying the intensified rumors of Outkast's disbandment, André 3000 began increasingly expressing his desire to pursue a solo career throughout the promotional cycle for Speakerboxxx/The Love Below. In an interview for Blender, he stated: "In a perfect world, this would be the last OutKast record." DeVille called Speakerboxxx the first indication of Big Boi's ability to record without André 3000, adding: "It's fair to wonder if Big Boi could have ever crossed over to pop and indie audiences without Andr[é] to kick in the door for him. But in terms of producing classic music, it seems like Andr[é] needed Big Boi a lot more than Big Boi needed Andr[é]." However, Outkast recorded another studio album together—Idlewild (2006), which also served as the soundtrack album for their musical film of the same title—before embarking on an extended hiatus in 2007. Idlewild was originally conceived as a visual counterpart to Speakerboxxx/The Love Below, composed of music videos for the album's tracks. However, it was reconstructed and postponed numerous times before its August 2006 release. Regardless, Speakerboxxx/The Love Below tracks "Bowtie", "Rooster", "Take Off Your Cool", "Church", "She Lives in My Lap", and "Vibrate" were still used in Idlewild as musical numbers. Preezy Brown of Revolt described the Idlewild project as "devoid of the air of excitement and fanfare that surrounded Speakerboxxx/The Love Below", calling the latter "the duo's last true shining moment under the Outkast banner.

== Track listing ==
Speakerboxxx
No.	Title	Writer(s)	Producer(s)	Length
1.	"Intro"		Cutmaster Swift	1:29
2.	"GhettoMusick"	André Benjamin; Antwan Patton; Kenny Gamble; Bunny Sigler	André 3000	3:56
3.	"Unhappy"	Patton; David Sheats	Mr. DJ	3:19
4.	"Bowtie" (featuring Sleepy Brown and Jazze Pha)	Patton; Patrick Brown; Phalon Alexander	Big Boi	3:56
5.	"The Way You Move" (featuring Sleepy Brown)	Patton; Brown; Carlton Mahone	Carl Mo; Big Boi^{[a]}	3:54
6.	"The Rooster"	Patton; Mahone; Donnie Mathis	Carl Mo; Big Boi^{[a]}	3:57
7.	"Bust" (featuring Killer Mike)	Patton; Michael Render; Myrna Crenshaw	Big Boi	3:09
8.	"War"	Benjamin; Patton; Sheats	Mr. DJ	2:43
9.	"Church"	Benjamin; Patton; Kevin Kendrick; Brown; Crenshaw	André 3000	3:27
10.	"Bamboo" (Interlude) (featuring Bamboo)			2:10
11.	"Tomb of the Boom" (featuring Konkrete, Big Gipp, and Ludacris)	Patton; James Patton; Cory Andrews; Nathaniel Elder; Cameron Gipp; Chris Bridges	Big Boi	4:46
12.	"E-Mac" (Interlude) (featuring E-Mac)			0:25
13.	"Knowing"	A. Patton	Mr. DJ; Big Boi^{[a]}	3:33
14.	"Flip Flop Rock" (featuring Killer Mike and Jay-Z)	A. Patton; Render; Shawn Carter; Sheats	Big Boi; Mr. DJ^{[a]}	4:36
15.	"Interlude"			1:15
16.	"Reset" (featuring Khujo and Cee-Lo)	A. Patton; Willie Knighton; Thomas Burton	Big Boi	4:36
17.	"D-Boi" (Interlude) (featuring Henry Welch)			0:40
18.	"Last Call" (featuring Slimm Calhoun, Lil Jon & The East Side Boyz, and Mello)	A. Patton; Benjamin; Brian Loving; James Hollins	André 3000	3:58
19.	"Bowtie" (Postlude)			0:35
Total length:				56:26

All tracks on The Love Below are written by André Benjamin, except where noted. All tracks are produced by André 3000; "Roses" is co-produced by Dojo5.

The Love Below
No.	Title	Writer(s)	Length
1.	"The Love Below" (Intro)		1:27
2.	"Love Hater"	Benjamin; Kendrick	2:49
3.	"God" (Interlude)		2:20
4.	"Happy Valentine's Day"		5:23
5.	"Spread"		3:51
6.	"Where Are My Panties?" (Interlude) (featuring Toni Hunter)		1:54
7.	"Prototype"		5:26
8.	"She Lives in My Lap" (featuring Rosario Dawson)	Benjamin; Brad Jordan; Willie Dennis; Doug King; Isaac Hayes; Roger Troutman; Dino Hawkins; Eric Vidal; Nick Vidal	4:27
9.	"Hey Ya!"		3:55
10.	"Roses"	Benjamin; Patton; Matt Boykin	6:09
11.	"Good Day, Good Sir" (Interlude) (featuring Fonzworth Bentley)		1:24
12.	"Behold a Lady"		4:37
13.	"Pink & Blue"	Benjamin; Robert Kelly	5:04
14.	"Love in War"		3:25
15.	"She's Alive"	Benjamin; Kendrick	4:06
16.	"Dracula's Wedding" (featuring Kelis)		2:32
17.	"The Letter" (featuring Qasha Aman)		0:21
18.	"My Favorite Things"	Oscar Hammerstein II; Richard Rodgers	5:14
19.	"Take Off Your Cool" (featuring Norah Jones)		2:38
20.	"Vibrate"		6:33
21.	"A Life in the Day of Benjamin André (Incomplete)"		5:11
Total length:			78:23

Notes

- ^{^[a]} signifies a co-producer
- The original pressings of The Love Below did not include "The Letter", and "My Favorite Things" was a hidden track. "Vibrate" did not include its six-second spoken outro, while the ending of "A Life in the Day of Benjamin André (Incomplete)" featured a radio interview instead of a fade-out. The revised edition was released in early 2004, and was made standard for all future pressings and digital editions.

Sample credits

- "Intro" contains an uncredited sample from an Emergency Broadcast System announcement by Don Pardo.
- "GhettoMusick" contains samples from "Love, Need and Want You" by Patti LaBelle.
- "She Lives in My Lap" contains samples from "Mind Playing Tricks on Me" by Geto Boys, and "Pistolgrip-Pump" by Volume 10.
- "Pink & Blue" contains samples from "Age Ain't Nothing but a Number" by Aaliyah, and an uncredited sample from "Why Can't We Live Together" by Timmy Thomas.
- "My Favorite Things" contains interpolations from John Coltrane's recording of the same title.

== Personnel ==
Credits are adapted from the liner notes of Speakerboxxx/The Love Below.

Speakerboxxx

- Big Boi – executive producer, lead vocals (all tracks), producer (tracks 4–7, 11, 14, 16), programming (tracks 4, 7, 11, 13, 15), keyboards (tracks 4, 7, 11, 13), background vocals (track 8)
- André 3000 – executive producer, lead vocals (track 2), producer (tracks 2, 9, 18), keyboards (tracks 2, 18), programming (track 18), additional vocals (track 13)
- L.A. Reid – executive producer
- Bernie Grundman – audio mastering (all tracks)
- Killer Mike – lead vocals (tracks 7, 14)
- Devine Evans – sound design, engineer
- Sleepy Brown – lead vocals (tracks 9, 11), backgrounds vocals (tracks 2, 3, 6, 7, 14), additional vocals (tracks 4, 5)
- Konkrete – lead vocals (track 11)
- Big Gipp – lead vocals (track 11)
- Ludacris – lead vocals (track 11)
- Jay-Z – lead vocals (track 14)
- Khujo Goodie – lead vocals (track 16)
- Cee-Lo – lead vocals (track 16)
- Mello – lead vocals (track 18)
- Slimm Calhoun – lead vocals (track 18)
- Cutmaster Swift – producer (track 1), cuts (tracks 6, 14)
- Mr. DJ – producer (tracks 3, 8, 13, 14)
- Carl Mo – producer (tracks 5, 6)
- Jazze Pha – additional vocals (track 4)
- Lil Jon & The Eastside Boyz – additional vocals (track 18)
- Myrna Crenshaw – background vocals (tracks 2, 7–9)
- Joi – background vocals (track 2)
- Debra Killings – background vocals (tracks 3, 9, 14, 16), bass (tracks 3–6, 8, 9, 14, 18)
- Tori Alamaze – background vocals (track 4)
- John Frye – audio recording, audio mixing (all tracks)
- Moka Nagatani – audio recording (tracks 2, 4, 13)
- Vincent Alexander – audio recording (tracks 5, 11), recording assistant (track 2)
- Matt Still – audio recording (track 9)
- Chris Carmouche – audio recording (track 11)
- Warren Bletcher – recording assistant (all tracks)
- Marvin "Chanz" Parkman – keyboards (tracks 3, 8, 9, 14, 16), organ (track 2), piano (track 6)
- Kevin Kendrick – keyboards (track 9)
- Donnie Mathis – guitar (tracks 3, 6)
- David Whild – guitar (tracks 4, 7, 8, 14)
- ZaZa – guitar (track 5)
- Preston Crump – bass (track 3)
- Aaron Mills – bass (track 9)
- Victor Alexander – drums (tracks 7, 8)
- Hornz Unlimited – horns (tracks 4–6, 18)
- Rajinder Kala – congos (track 3)
- Regina Davenport – A&R direction and coordination, production coordinator
- Theresa Wilson – A&R administrator
- Michael "Big Blue" Williams – management
- Joe-Mama Nitzberg – creative direction
- Jeff Schulz – art direction and design
- Jonathan Mannion – photography

The Love Below

- André 3000 – executive producer, lead vocals (all tracks), producer (all tracks), programming (tracks 1, 9, 12), keyboards (tracks 1, 9, 12), guitar (tracks 4, 7, 8, 18), tenor saxophone (track 8), acoustic guitar (track 9), background vocals (track 19)
- Big Boi – executive producer, lead vocals (track 10; uncredited), background vocals (track 6)
- L.A. Reid – executive producer
- Brian "Big Bass" Gardner – audio mastering (all tracks)
- Kelis – lead vocals (track 15)
- Norah Jones – lead vocals (track 19)
- Killer Mike – background vocals (track 10)
- Sleepy Brown – background vocals (track 19)
- Joi – additional vocals (track 4)
- Myrna Crenshaw – additional vocals (track 4)
- Marianne Lee Stiff – additional vocals (track 7)
- John Frisbee – additional vocals (track 7)
- Rosario Dawson – additional vocals (track 8)
- Rabeka Tunei – additional vocals (track 9), recording assistant (track 9)
- John Frye – audio recording (all tracks), audio mixing (tracks 10, 14, 17), pre-mixing (tracks 2–8, 10–13, 15, 18, 19)
- Robert "HipHop" Hannon – audio recording (tracks 4, 5, 9)
- Pete Novak – audio recording (tracks 4, 5, 9, 10, 12, 14, 15, 17, 19), audio mixing (track 15), pre-mixing (tracks 4, 5, 12)
- Matt Still – audio recording (track 7)
- Terrence Cash – audio recording (track 8)
- Reggie Cozier – audio recording (track 13)
- Darrell Thorp – audio recording (track 13)
- Brian Paluralski – audio recording (track 15)
- Padraic Kernin – audio recording (track 18), recording assistant (track 18)
- Neal Pogue – audio mixing (tracks 2, 7–9, 18, 19)
- Dexter Simmons – audio mixing (tracks 4, 5, 12, 13)
- Warren Bletcher – recording assistant (all tracks)
- Josh Monroy – recording assistant (tracks 4, 5, 9)
- Russell Buelna – recording assistant (tracks 4, 13, 14, 19), mixing assistant (track 15)
- Chris Carmouche – recording assistant (tracks 8, 13)
- Jared Robbins – recording assistant (tracks 9, 15), mixing assistant (track 15)
- Jeff Moses – recording assistant (tracks 12, 14, 17)
- Greg Burns – recording assistant (track 13), mixing assistant (track 13)
- Chris Steffen – recording assistant (track 13), mixing assistant (track 13)
- Donnie Whittemore – mixing assistant (tracks 4, 12, 13)
- Alex Reverberi – mixing assistant (tracks 5, 7, 8, 10, 14, 18, 19)
- Malik Albert – mixing assistant (track 8)
- Greg Price – mixing assistant (track 9)
- Sean Tallman – mixing assistant (track 17)
- Kevin Kendrick – keyboards (tracks 2, 5, 7, 9, 10, 14, 19), guitar (track 4), piano (track 17)
- Marvin "Chanz" Parkman – keyboards (tracks 8, 19)
- Darryl Smith – guitar (track 2)
- Tomi Martin – guitar (track 8)
- Moffet Morris – upright bass (track 4)
- Kevin Brandon – double bass (tracks 4, 14)
- Kevin Smith – electric bass (track 5)
- Aaron Mills – bass (tracks 7, 8, 17)
- Hornz Unlimited – horns (tracks 2, 14, 19), trumpets (tracks 5, 8)
- Cutmaster Swift – cuts (tracks 5, 8)
- Jef Van Veen – drums (tracks 2, 14)
- Benjamin Wright – string arrangement, conductor (track 13)
- Charles Veal – violin, concert master (track 13)
- James Sitterly – violin (track 13)
- Mark Casillas – violin (track 13)
- Gina Kranstadt – violin (track 13)
- Marisa McClead – violin (track 13)
- Mark Cargill – violin (track 13)
- Richard Adkins – violin (track 13)
- Tibor Zelig – violin (track 13)
- Yarda Kettner – violin (track 13)
- Louis Kabok – violin (track 13)
- Patrick Morgan – viola (track 13)
- Robin Ross – viola (track 13)
- Michel Vardone – viola (track 13)
- March Vaj – viola (track 13)
- John Krovaza – cello (track 13)
- Martin Smith – cello (track 13)
- Lisa Chien – cello (track 13)
- Catherine Chan – cello (track 13)
- Kelvin Brandon – contra, bass (track 13)
- Kevin O'Neal – contra, bass (track 13)
- Gary Harris – saxophone (track 17)
- Fulton Yard Unlimited – digital editing (track 14)
- Regina Davenport – A&R direction and coordination, production coordinator
- Theresa Wilson – A&R administrator
- Michael "Big Blue" Williams – management
- Joe-Mama Nitzberg – creative direction
- Jeff Schulz – art direction and design
- Torkil Gudnason – photography

== Charts ==
=== Weekly charts ===
2003–2004 weekly chart performance
Chart	Peak position
Australian Albums (ARIA)	9
Australian Urban Albums (ARIA)	2
Austrian Albums (Ö3 Austria)	28
Belgian Albums (Ultratop Flanders)	21
Belgian Albums (Ultratop Wallonia)	58
Canadian Albums (Billboard)	4
Canadian R&B Albums (Nielsen SoundScan)	3
Danish Albums (Hitlisten)	13
Dutch Albums (Album Top 100)	15
European Top 100 Albums (Billboard)	6
Finnish Albums (Suomen virallinen lista)	15
French Albums (SNEP)	13
German Albums (Offizielle Top 100)	21
Irish Albums (IRMA)	3
Italian Albums (FIMI)	35
Japanese Albums (Oricon)	32
New Zealand Albums (RMNZ)	3
Norwegian Albums (VG-lista)	4
Polish Albums (ZPAV)	35
Scottish Albums (Official Charts)	9
Swedish Albums (Sverigetopplistan)	11
Swiss Albums (Schweizer Hitparade)	11
UK Albums (Official Charts)	8
UK R&B Albums (Official Charts)	1
US Billboard 200	1
US Top R&B/Hip-Hop Albums (Billboard)	1

=== Monthly charts ===
2004 monthly chart performance
Chart	Peak position
South Korean International Albums (RIAK)	17

=== Year-end charts ===
2003 year-end chart performance
Chart	Position
New Zealand Albums (RMNZ)	41
Swedish Albums (Sverigetopplistan)	46
UK Albums (OCC)	132
US Billboard 200	29
US Top R&B/Hip-Hop Albums (Billboard)	15
Worldwide Albums (IFPI)	11

2004 year-end chart performance
Chart	Position
Australian Albums (ARIA)	28
Belgian Albums (Ultratop Flanders)	77
Dutch Albums (Album Top 100)	41
French Albums (SNEP)	157
German Albums (Offizielle Top 100)	66
New Zealand Albums (RMNZ)	18
Swedish Albums (Sverigetopplistan)	86
UK Albums (OCC)	23
US Billboard 200	2
US Top R&B/Hip-Hop Albums (Billboard)	5
Worldwide Albums (IFPI)	25

=== Decade-end charts ===
2000s decade-end chart performance
Chart	Position
US Billboard 200	33

== Certifications ==
Certifications and sales
Region	Certification	Certified units/sales
Australia (ARIA)	2× Platinum	140,000^{‡}
Canada (Music Canada)	Gold	50,000^{^}
Denmark (IFPI Danmark)	2× Platinum	40,000^{‡}
Germany (BVMI)	Gold	100,000^{^}
Hungary (MAHASZ)	Gold	10,000^{^}
Japan (RIAJ)	Gold	100,000^{^}
New Zealand (RMNZ)	3× Platinum	45,000^{^}
Norway (IFPI Norway)	Gold	20,000^{*}
South Korea	—	3,217
Sweden (GLF)	Gold	30,000^{^}
Switzerland (IFPI Switzerland)	Gold	20,000^{^}
United Kingdom (BPI)	3× Platinum	900,000^{‡}
United States (RIAA)	13× Platinum	6,500,000^{‡}
Summaries
Europe (IFPI)	Platinum	1,000,000^{*}
Worldwide	—	11,400,000
^{*} Sales figures based on certification alone.^{^} Shipments figures based on certification alone.^{‡} Sales+streaming figures based on certification alone.

== Release history ==
Release dates and formats
Region	Date	Format(s)	Label(s)	Ref.
United States	September 23, 2003	Cassette; double CD; vinyl	Arista	
Sweden	September 24, 2003	Double CD	BMG	
Germany	September 29, 2003	Double CD	BMG	
United Kingdom	September 29, 2003	Double CD	Arista	
Japan	October 8, 2003	Double CD	BMG	
Australia	October 13, 2003	Double CD	BMG	
South Korea	February 6, 2004	Double CD	BMG	
Europe	April 7, 2017	Vinyl	Sony	
Australia	April 14, 2017	Vinyl	Sony	

== See also ==
- Outkast discography
- List of Billboard 200 number-one albums of 2003
- List of Billboard number-one R&B albums of 2003
- List of Billboard 200 number-one albums of 2004
- List of UK R&B Albums Chart number ones of 2004
- List of best-selling albums in the United States
