= Roses (Outkast song) =

2004 single by OutKast

Single by OutKast

from the album Speakerboxxx/The Love Below
- B-side: "Church"
- Released: March 1, 2004
- Length: 6:09
- Label: LaFace; Arista
- Songwriters: André Benjamin; Antwan Patton; Matt Boykin
- Producer: André 3000

OutKast singles chronology
"The Way You Move" (2003)	"Roses" (2004)	"Prototype" (2004)

"Roses" is a song by American hip hop duo OutKast. It was released on March 1, 2004, as the fourth single from their 2003 double album, Speakerboxxx/The Love Below. It appears on André 3000's The Love Below disc and is the only track on his disc to feature Big Boi. The track was largely popular in the United Kingdom and the United States, peaking at number four on the UK Singles Chart and number nine on the Billboard Hot 100. It also found popularity in Australia, reaching number two on the Australian Singles Chart. It was their fourth and final top-10 song in the United States.

== Background ==
Lyrically, "Roses" is a diss song aimed at superficial women—personified in the song as "Caroline". It is the only song on The Love Below (André 3000's half of the double album) to feature a guest verse from Big Boi.

== Music video ==
The video references the stage musicals West Side Story and Grease, and features cameo appearances from Paula Abdul, Lukas Haas, Kevin McDonald, Fonzworth Bentley, members of the Dungeon Family, Katt Williams, Faizon Love, and DeRay Davis.

A man is flipping through a Stankonia yearbook and sees the photo of Caroline Jones represented as the school's "Biggest Flirt". After Caroline leaves the bathroom with her girls, Big Boi is shown with his crew, appearing as stereotypical jocks. He opens a response to the note he gave to Caroline, asking if she'd be his valentine. Rather than checking off the Yes or No boxes, she writes "Maybe". Upset, Big Boi calls his crew to ride with him to school.

André 3000 is shown to be heading a musical on stage, where he sings the song and parodies Caroline, though Caroline is oblivious. During this time, Big Boi's crew, Speakerboxxx, drives to the school, performing acts of vandalism such as knocking down mailboxes. When Big Boi crashes the auditorium where the play is under way, Speakerboxxx announces their arrival, which is followed by the men on the stage announcing themselves as the Love Below.

Despite the pleas of the principal for no fighting, the two groups confront each other in the middle of the auditorium. Most of the students wind up in the fight, including the principal himself. Big Boi moves away from the fight and directs his rap to an uncaring Caroline. In the end, an effeminate man hands Caroline a red rose and pleads with her to leave. They pause, take a look at the chaos behind them, and depart. André 3000 is carried off. The yearbook reader falls asleep after finishing the story.

== Track listings ==
US 12-inch single

A1. "Roses" (radio edit) – 4:14
A2. "Roses" (instrumental) – 4:43
B1. "Roses" (club mix) – 6:14
B2. "Roses" (a cappella) – 5:25

US 7-inch single

A. "Roses" (radio mix) – 4:14
B. "Roses" (instrumental) – 4:43

UK CD and 12-inch picture disc single

1. "Roses" (album version)
2. "Church"

Australian CD single

1. "Roses" (radio edit) – 4:14
2. "Roses" (album version) – 6:09
3. "Roses" (instrumental) – 4:43
4. "Roses" (video)

== Charts ==
=== Weekly charts ===
Chart (2004)	Peak position
Australia (ARIA)	2
Australian Urban (ARIA)	1
Austria (Ö3 Austria Top 40)	18
Belgium (Ultratop 50 Flanders)	47
Belgium (Ultratip Bubbling Under Wallonia)	10
Canada CHR/Pop Top 30 (Radio & Records)	5
Denmark (Tracklisten)	15
Europe (Eurochart Hot 100)	10
Germany (GfK)	21
Ireland (IRMA)	6
Netherlands (Dutch Top 40)	22
Netherlands (Single Top 100)	25
New Zealand (Recorded Music NZ)	5
Norway (VG-lista)	9
Scotland Singles (OCC)	6
Switzerland (Schweizer Hitparade)	65
UK Singles (OCC)	4
UK Hip Hop/R&B (OCC)	3
US Billboard Hot 100	9
US Hot R&B/Hip-Hop Songs (Billboard)	12
US Hot Rap Songs (Billboard)	5
US Pop Airplay (Billboard)	4
US Rhythmic Airplay (Billboard)	7

=== Year-end charts ===
Chart (2004)	Position
Australia (ARIA)	41
UK Singles (OCC)	105
US Billboard Hot 100	56
US Hot R&B/Hip-Hop Singles & Tracks (Billboard)	62
US Mainstream Top 40 (Billboard)	36
US Rhythmic Top 40 (Billboard)	41

== Certifications ==
Region	Certification	Certified units/sales
Australia (ARIA)	2× Platinum	140,000^{‡}
Denmark (IFPI Danmark)	Gold	45,000^{‡}
Germany (BVMI)	Gold	150,000^{‡}
New Zealand (RMNZ)	2× Platinum	60,000^{‡}
United Kingdom (BPI)	Platinum	600,000^{‡}
United States (RIAA)	3× Platinum	3,000,000^{‡}
^{‡} Sales+streaming figures based on certification alone.

== Release history ==
Region	Date	Format(s)	Label(s)	Ref.
United States	March 1, 2004	Contemporary hit; rhythmic contemporary; urban radio	LaFace; Arista	
Australia	May 31, 2004	CD	LaFace	
Denmark	June 14, 2004	CD	LaFace; Arista; BMG	
United Kingdom	June 21, 2004	12-inch vinyl; CD	LaFace; Arista; BMG	
