= List of UK R&B Albums Chart number ones of 2004 =

The logo of the Official Charts Company, responsible for compiling all of the official music charts in the United Kingdom, including the R&B albums chart.

The UK R&B Chart is a weekly chart, first introduced in October 1994, that ranks the 40 biggest-selling singles and albums that are classified in the R&B genre in the United Kingdom. The chart is compiled by the Official Charts Company, and is based on sales of CDs, downloads, vinyl and other formats over the previous seven days.

The following are the number-one albums of 2004.

== Number-one albums ==
Issue date	Album	Artist(s)	Record label	Ref.
4 January	Elephunk	The Black Eyed Peas	A&M/will.i.am	
11 January	Speakerboxxx/The Love Below	OutKast	LaFace/Arista	
18 January	Speakerboxxx/The Love Below	OutKast	LaFace/Arista	
25 January	Speakerboxxx/The Love Below	OutKast	LaFace/Arista	
1 February	The Soul Sessions	Joss Stone	Relentless/Virgin	
8 February	The Soul Sessions	Joss Stone	Relentless/Virgin	
15 February	The Soul Sessions	Joss Stone	Relentless/Virgin	
22 February	Speakerboxxx/The Love Below	OutKast	LaFace/Arista	
29 February	Speakerboxxx/The Love Below	OutKast	LaFace/Arista	
7 March	Speakerboxxx/The Love Below	OutKast	LaFace/Arista	
14 March	Speakerboxxx/The Love Below	OutKast	LaFace/Arista	
21 March	Best of R&B	Various Artists	EMI/Virgin/Sony TV	
28 March	Confessions	Usher	Arista	
4 April	Confessions	Usher	Arista	
11 April	Confessions	Usher	Arista	
18 April	Confessions	Usher	Arista	
25 April	Musicology	Prince	NPG/Columbia	
2 May	D12 World	D12	Shady/Interscope	
9 May	D12 World	D12	Shady/Interscope	
16 May	A Grand Don't Come for Free	The Streets	Locked On/679	
23 May	A Grand Don't Come for Free	The Streets	Locked On/679	
30 May	Hurt No More	Mario Winans	Bad Boy	
6 June	Hurt No More	Mario Winans	Bad Boy	
13 June	A Grand Don't Come for Free	The Streets	Locked On/679	
20 June	To the 5 Boroughs	Beastie Boys	Capitol	
27 June	A Grand Don't Come for Free	The Streets	Locked On/679	
4 July	Original Pirate Material	The Streets	Locked On/679	
11 July	A Grand Don't Come for Free	The Streets	Locked On/679	
18 July	A Grand Don't Come for Free	The Streets	Locked On/679	
25 July	A Grand Don't Come for Free	The Streets	Locked On/679	
1 August	A Grand Don't Come for Free	The Streets	Locked On/679	
8 August	A Grand Don't Come for Free	The Streets	Locked On/679	
15 August	The Best of R&B - Summer Selection	Various Artists	BMG TV/EMI/Virgin	
22 August	The Best of R&B - Summer Selection	Various Artists	BMG TV/EMI/Virgin	
29 August	A Grand Don't Come for Free	The Streets	Locked On/679	
5 September	Westwood - The Takeover	Various Artists	Def Jam	
12 September	Westwood - The Takeover	Various Artists	Def Jam	
19 September	Greatest Hits	Goldie Lookin Chain	Atlantic	
26 September	Greatest Hits	Goldie Lookin Chain	Atlantic	
3 October	Mind Body & Soul	Joss Stone	Relentless/Virgin	
10 October	Mind Body & Soul	Joss Stone	Relentless/Virgin	
17 October	Confessions	Usher	Arista	
24 October	Confessions	Usher	Arista	
31 October	Confessions	Usher	Arista	
7 November	Westwood - The Big Dawg	Various Artists	Def Jam	
14 November	Encore	Eminem	Shady/Aftermath/Interscope	
21 November	Encore	Eminem	Shady/Aftermath/Interscope	
28 November	Encore	Eminem	Shady/Aftermath/Interscope	
5 December	Encore	Eminem	Shady/Aftermath/Interscope	
12 December	Encore	Eminem	Shady/Aftermath/Interscope	
19 December	Destiny Fulfilled	Destiny's Child	Columbia/Sony Urban	
26 December	Encore	Eminem	Shady/Aftermath/Interscope	

== See also ==
- List of UK Albums Chart number ones of the 2010s
