= The Way You Move =

2003 single by Outkast

Single by Outkast featuring Sleepy Brown

from the album Speakerboxxx/The Love Below
- Released: August 25, 2003
- Studio: Stankonia (Atlanta, Georgia)
- Genre: Hip hop soul; Southern hip hop
- Length: 3:55
- Label: LaFace; Arista
- Songwriters: Antwan Patton; Patrick Brown; Carlton Mahone
- Producers: Big Boi; Carl-Mo

Outkast singles chronology
"Hey Ya!" (2003)	"The Way You Move" (2003)	"Roses" (2004)

Sleepy Brown singles chronology
"A.D.I.D.A.S." (2003)	"The Way You Move" (2003)	"I Can't Wait" (2004)

Music video
- "The Way You Move" on YouTube

"The Way You Move" is a song by the American hip hop duo Outkast, performed by its member Big Boi. The song features Outkast mentor Sleepy Brown on guest vocals. Along with "Hey Ya!", recorded by Outkast's other member André 3000, "The Way You Move" served as the second single from Outkast's double album Speakerboxxx/The Love Below.

Released from Big Boi's Speakerboxxx half of the double album by LaFace and Arista Records on August 25, 2003, "The Way You Move" peaked at number one on the US Billboard Hot 100 the following year, becoming Outkast's third number-one pop single, and the 900th for Billboard. In 2009, it was named the 22nd most successful song of the 2000s on the Billboard Hot 100 Songs of the Decade.

== Song information ==
"The Way You Move" is credited to Big Boi, Sleepy Brown, and the song's producer, Carlton Mahone; Big Boi also does some co-production. Combining elements of bass music, Atlanta-style southern hip hop, and 1970s soul music, "The Way You Move" is Big Boi's light-hearted dedication to women.

The song's instrumental track is punctuated with the prominent live horn section "Hornz Unlimited" of Atlanta reminiscent of Earth, Wind and Fire, which features Sleepy Brown singing in style inspired by the work of Motown star Marvin Gaye.

== Music video ==
The song's music video, directed by Bryan Barber, features Big Boi as the proprietor of a rim shop. The video's performance shots eventually gravitate to other locations during the video's running time, featuring several young women who Big Boi, dressed in a pimp's suit, attempts to pick up.

The video features an appearance from Fonzworth Bentley and another from actress Ki Toy Johnson. "The Way You Move" music video was designed to be shown in tandem with the video for André 3000's "Hey Ya!". A long-form "The Way You Move/Hey Ya!" video combines both clips with a bridging sequence. The music video opens with Big Boi and Sleepy Brown pulling into a garage that specializes in automotive audio systems.

== Chart performance ==
"The Way You Move" debuted at number 83 on the week ending September 27, 2003, a month after its release. It would later reach number two for eight consecutive weeks behind the group's other lead single "Hey Ya!".

It finally replaced "Hey Ya!" at number one on February 14, 2004, where it stayed for one week, which was the sixth time a recording act has replaced itself on the Billboard pop chart. "The Way You Move" was ranked number five on the 2004 Billboard Year-End Chart. On the Hot R&B/Hip-Hop Singles & Tracks chart, "The Way You Move" peaked at number two (seven positions higher than "Hey Ya!"), and topped the Hot Rap Tracks chart.

== Track listings ==
UK CD1

1. "The Way You Move" (club mix) – 3:56
2. "The Way You Move" (Johnny Toobad full length vocal) – 6:55
3. "The Way You Move" (Full Phat radio mix) – 3:35
4. "The Way You Move" (video)

UK CD2

1. "The Way You Move" (clean album version) – 3:56
2. "The Way You Move" (Johnny Toobad radio mix) – 3:52

Europe single

1. "The Way You Move" (radio mix) – 3:55
2. "The Way You Move" (Full Phatt radio mix) – 3:31

European and Australian maxi-single

1. "The Way You Move" (radio mix) – 3:55
2. "The Way You Move" (Full Phatt radio mix) – 3:31
3. "The Way You Move" (Johnny Too Bad radio mix) – 3:52
4. "The Way You Move" (Cutmaster Swift remix) – 4:22
5. "The Way You Move" (video)

"The Way You Move" / "Hey Ya!" 12-inch vinyl single

A1. "The Way You Move" (radio mix) – 3:55
A2. "The Way You Move" (club mix) – 3:55
A3. "The Way You Move" (instrumental) – 3:55
B1. "Hey Ya!" (radio mix) – 4:09
B2. "Hey Ya!" (instrumental) – 4:09

== Charts ==
=== Weekly charts ===
Chart (2003–2004)	Peak position
Australia (ARIA)	7
Australian Urban (ARIA)	4
Austria (Ö3 Austria Top 40)	49
Belgium (Ultratop 50 Flanders)	44
Belgium (Ultratip Bubbling Under Wallonia)	4
Croatia (HRT)	10
Denmark (Tracklisten)	9
Europe (Eurochart Hot 100)	20
Finland (Suomen virallinen lista)	19
Germany (GfK)	31
Hungary (Single Top 40)	6
Ireland (IRMA)	18
Italy (FIMI)	25
Netherlands (Dutch Top 40 Tipparade)	3
Netherlands (Single Top 100)	76
New Zealand (Recorded Music NZ)	6
Norway (VG-lista)	16
Scotland Singles (Official Charts)	14
South Korea International Singles (Gaon)	20
Sweden (Sverigetopplistan)	33
Switzerland (Schweizer Hitparade)	49
UK Singles (Official Charts)	7
UK Hip Hop/R&B (Official Charts)	2
US Billboard Hot 100	1
US Adult Pop Airplay (Billboard)	34
US Hot R&B/Hip-Hop Songs (Billboard)	2
US Hot Rap Songs (Billboard)	1
US Pop Airplay (Billboard)	1

=== Year-end charts ===
Chart (2003)	Position
US Rhythmic Top 40 (Billboard)	45

Chart (2004)	Position
Australia (ARIA)	66
UK Singles (OCC)	91
UK Urban (Music Week)	19
US Billboard Hot 100	5
US Dance Radio Airplay (Billboard)	38
US Hot R&B/Hip-Hop Singles & Tracks (Billboard)	13
US Hot Rap Tracks (Billboard)	10
US Mainstream Top 40 (Billboard)	5
US Rhythmic Top 40 (Billboard)	31

=== All-time charts ===
Chart	Position
US Billboard Hot 100	148

== Certifications ==
Region	Certification	Certified units/sales
Australia (ARIA)	Platinum	70,000^{‡}
New Zealand (RMNZ)	Platinum	30,000^{‡}
United Kingdom (BPI)	Silver	200,000^{‡}
United States (RIAA)	3× Platinum	3,000,000^{‡}
United States (RIAA) Video single	Platinum	50,000^{^}
^{^} Shipments figures based on certification alone.^{‡} Sales+streaming figures based on certification alone.

== Release history ==
Region	Date	Format(s)	Label(s)	Ref.
United States	August 25, 2003	Rhythmic contemporary; urban radio	Arista	
United States	November 24, 2003	Contemporary hit radio	Arista	
Sweden	March 3, 2004	CD	Arista	
Australia	March 8, 2004	CD	Arista	
Denmark	March 8, 2004	CD	Arista	
United Kingdom	March 22, 2004	12-inch vinyl; CD	Arista	

== In popular culture ==
- The song was featured and poked fun at in an episode of Chappelle's Show, in a skit entitled "Making the Band", in which P. Diddy (played by Chappelle) is joined by his assistant, Fonzworth Bentley (played by Chappelle), who comes flying in using his umbrella as a parachute, just as Fonzworth does in "The Way You Move" music video.
- A heavily edited version of the song is featured in the console versions of Tiger Woods PGA Tour 2005, and is a playable song in Shark Tale.
- The "Full Phatt Radio Mix" is featured on Dance Dance Revolution Universe 2.
- A marching band performance of the song was included in the Super Bowl XXXVIII halftime show
- Big Boi performed the song in the Super Bowl LIII halftime show.

== Kenny G and Earth, Wind & Fire cover ==
"The Way You Move"

Single by Kenny G feat. Earth, Wind & Fire

from the album At Last... The Duets Album and Illumination
- Released: 2004
- Genre: Smooth jazz
- Length: 4:09
- Label: Arista
- Songwriters: Patrick Brown, Carlton "Carl Mo" Mahone, Antwan Patton
- Producer: Walter Afanasieff

Earth, Wind & Fire singles chronology
"Show Me the Way" (2004)	"The Way You Move" (2004)	"Pure Gold" (2005)

Kenny G singles chronology
"I Believe I Can Fly feat. Yolanda Adams" (2005)	"The Way You Move" (2004)	"My Favourite Things" (2005)

In 2004, saxophonist Kenny G and Earth, Wind & Fire issued a cover of "The Way You Move" as a single on Arista Records. The song reached No. 12 on both the Billboard Adult Contemporary Songs chart and Billboard Smooth Jazz Songs chart. "The Way You Move" also reached No. 25 on the Billboard Adult R&B Songs chart.

=== Overview ===
"The Way You Move" appeared on Kenny G's 2004 LP At Last...The Duets Album and Earth, Wind & Fire's 2005 album Illumination.

=== Critical reception ===
People called the tune a "polyrythmic party". Matt Collar of Allmusic declared that "Earth, Wind & Fire pull a 'no brainer' on Outkast's 'The Way You Move.'" David Wild of Rolling Stone said that this version "could go down as the funkiest song" in Kenny G's catalog.

=== Charts ===
Year	Chart	Peak position
2005	U.S. Billboard Adult Contemporary Songs	12
2005	U.S. Billboard Smooth Jazz Songs	12
2005	U.S. Billboard Adult R&B Songs	12

== See also ==
- List of Hot 100 number-one singles of 2004 (U.S.)
