= Hey Ya! =

2003 single by Outkast

Single by Outkast

from the album Speakerboxxx/The Love Below
- B-side: "GhettoMusick"; "My Favorite Things"
- Written: 2000
- Released: August 25, 2003
- Recorded: 2002
- Studio: Karma, Tree Sound (Atlanta, Georgia); Larrabee Sound (Los Angeles, California)
- Genre: Pop; electro; funk; neo-soul
- Length: 3:55
- Label: Arista; BMG
- Songwriter: André Benjamin
- Producer: André 3000

Outkast singles chronology
"GhettoMusick" (2003)	"Hey Ya!" (2003)	"The Way You Move" (2003)

Music video
- "Hey Ya!" on YouTube

"Hey Ya!" is a song by American hip hop duo Outkast, performed by its member André 3000, who wrote and produced the song. Along with "The Way You Move", which was recorded by Outkast's other member Big Boi and featured Sleepy Brown, "Hey Ya!" was released by Arista Records as the second single from the duo's fifth album, Speakerboxxx/The Love Below, on August 25, 2003. It reached number one in the United States, Australia, Canada, the Czech Republic, Norway, and Sweden. "Hey Ya!" received acclaim and is consistently ranked as one of the greatest songs of the 2000s. It was ranked number 10 in Rolling Stone's 2021 list of the "500 Greatest Songs of All Time".

== Recording ==
André 3000 wrote "Hey Ya!" in 2000 and began work on recording it in December 2002 at Stankonia Studios in Atlanta, Georgia. He used an acoustic guitar for accompaniment, inspired by bands such as the Ramones, Buzzcocks, The Smiths and particularly The Hives, whom he said the song would not exist without having been inspired by seeing them perform live.

André recorded the introduction, the first verse, the hook, and the vocals around the same time, using several dozen takes. He returned to work on the song several evenings later, with session musician Kevin Kendricks performing the bassline on the synthesizer. Months later, André 3000 worked with Pete Novak at the Larrabee Sound Studios in Los Angeles. They experimented with various sound effects, including singing through a vocoder, and did 30 to 40 takes for each line.

== Composition ==
"Hey Ya!" is a song in G major. Each cadential six-measure phrase is constructed using a change of meter on the fourth measure (creating a song with 22 quarter note beats per phrase) and uses a I–IV–V–VI chord progression. G major and C major chords are played for one and two 4/4 measures, respectively. André 3000 then uses a deceptive cadence after a 2/4 measure of the dominant D major chord, leading into two 4/4 measures of an E major chord (against a G note in the melody implying E minor). The song moves at a tempo of 159 beats per minute, and André's vocal range spans more than an octave and a half, from B_{3} to G_{5}.

The song opens with three pick-up beats as André 3000 counts "one, two, three, oh" (with the "oh" on beat 1) and then leads into the first verse. The lyrics begin to describe the protagonist's concerns and doubts about a romantic relationship. He wonders if they are staying together just "for tradition", as in the lines "But does she really wanna [mess around] / But can't stand to see me / Walk out the door?" André 3000 commented, "I think it's more important to be happy than to meet up to...the world's expectations of what a relationship should be. So this is a celebration of how men and women relate to each other in the 2000s". The song leads into the chorus, which consists of the line "Hey ya!" repeated eight times, accompanied by a synthesizer performing the bassline.

During the second verse, the protagonist gets cold feet and wonders what the purpose of continuing the relationship is, pondering the question, "If they say nothing is forever...then what makes love the exception?" After repeating the chorus, the song leads into a call and response section. André 3000 jokes, "What's cooler than being cool?", and the "fellas'" response, an overdubbed version of his vocals, is "Ice cold", a reference to one of André Benjamin's stage names. He then calls to the "ladies", whose response is overdubbed from vocals by Rabeka Tuinei, who was an assistant to the audio engineer.

The song's breakdown coined the phrase "shake it like a Polaroid picture", a reference to a technique used by some photographers to expedite drying of damp instant film photos taken with film made by the Polaroid Corporation. It is an ongoing urban myth that shaking photos taken by the instant camera makes them dry faster. The breakdown also namechecks singer Beyoncé and actress Lucy Liu, in a turn of phrase alluding to the song "Independent Women Part I", which was performed by Destiny's Child for the 2000 film adaptation of Charlie's Angels, in which Liu starred. Though the line "now all Beyoncés and Lucy Lius" is meant to mean "now all the independent women", André 3000 says he included the lyric because the music video for "Independent Women Part I" was playing on his TV as he wrote "Hey Ya!". The song closes by repeating the chorus and then gradually fading out.

== Critical reception ==
"Hey Ya!" received acclaim. At the 46th Annual Grammy Awards, it won Best Urban/Alternative Performance and was nominated for Record of the Year, but lost to Coldplay's "Clocks". It topped the 2003 Pazz & Jop list, a survey of several hundred music critics conducted by Robert Christgau, with 322 mentions, beating runner-up Beyoncé and Jay-Z's "Crazy in Love" by 119. Subsequently, Pitchfork gave it the number two slot in its "The Top 100 Singles of 2000–2004" feature in January 2005, bested only by OutKast's own "B.O.B".

The song's unusual arrangement drew comparisons to artists from a variety of genres. PopMatters described the track as "brilliantly rousing" and "spazzy with electrifying multiplicity". Entertainment Weekly highlighted it as the catchiest song on the double album, and Stylus Magazine identified it as one of the best songs in OutKast's history. Pitchfork referred to it as the apex of the album and added that it successfully mixed Flaming Lips-style instrumentation with the energy of Prince's 1983 single "Little Red Corvette". Marcello Carlin of Uncut described the song as "Andre going power pop with overtones of early-'80s electro; The Knack meet side one of the The's Soul Mining."

Blender described it as a mix of soul music by Ike Turner and new wave music by Devo and later as an "electro/folk-rock/funk/power pop/hip-hop/neo-soul/kitchen sink rave-up". Rolling Stone compared André 3000's vocals to those of "an indie-rock Little Richard" and the backing arrangement to the Beatles' 1969 album Abbey Road. New York also likened it to the Beatles and found it to be one of the best singles of 2003. AllMusic described it as an "incandescent" mix of electro, funk, and soul music. NME likened trying to classify the song as "akin to trying to lasso water" and described it as "a monumental barney between the Camberwick Green brass band, a cruise-ship cabaret act, a cartoon gospel choir and a sucker MC hiccuping 'Shake it like a Polaroid pic-chaaaa!' backed up by the cast of an amateur production of The Wizard of Oz. Sort of."

== Commercial performance ==
"Hey Ya!" was successful in North America, first charting on the week ending October 18, 2003, at number 57 on the Billboard Hot 100, three weeks after "The Way You Move" featuring Sleepy Brown debuted; which was at number 25 at the time. It topped the Hot 100 for nine weeks, from December 13, 2003, to February 7, 2004. The digital sales topped the Billboard Hot Digital Tracks for 17 consecutive weeks. The song's time at number one bridged two eras, ending Casey Kasem's second tenure as host of American Top 40 and beginning Ryan Seacrest's tenure as host. The song performed well in urban contemporary markets, topping the Rhythmic Top 40 chart and reaching number nine on the Hot R&B/Hip-Hop Singles & Tracks. It was also successful in mainstream music, topping the Top 40 Mainstream and Top 40 Tracks and reaching number 13 on the Adult Top 40. The song also crossed over to modern rock radio, and peaked at number 16 on Billboard's Alternative Songs chart in December 2003. In 2004, André 3000 performed the song at The 2004 Kids' Choice Awards and the song won the award for Favorite Song. Later in the year, the song appeared on the compilation album Now That's What I Call Music! 16. It also appeared on the album Now That's What I Call Music! Number 1's in 2006 as well as the Now That's What I Call Party Hits! album in 2007.

The song also performed well in Europe. In the United Kingdom, it debuted at number six on the UK singles chart and peaked at number three after 12 weeks, remaining on the chart for a total of 21 weeks. "Hey Ya!" topped the Norwegian singles chart for seven weeks, and it reached the top in Sweden for the first week of 2004. It performed well across the continent, reaching the top ten in Austria, Finland, France, Germany, Ireland, and Switzerland. "Hey Ya!" debuted at number 17 on Australia's ARIA Singles Chart, and later topped the chart for two consecutive weeks. The song remained on the chart for 16 weeks and was certified 11× platinum by the Australian Recording Industry Association. The song charted at number 61 for the 2003 end of year chart and was listed at number 15 on the 2004 chart and number five on the 2004 urban chart. It was also successful in New Zealand, reaching number two and staying on the RIANZ Singles Chart for 23 weeks.

"Hey Ya!" was the first song on Apple Inc.'s iTunes to reach one million downloads. In September 2005, it received a platinum certification from the Recording Industry Association of America (RIAA) for shipping one million copies within the US.

== Accolades ==
Accolades for "Hey Ya!"
Year	Organization	Award	Result
2004	BET Awards	Video of the Year	Won
2004	BET Awards	Viewer's Choice	Nominated
2004	Grammy Award	Record of the Year	Nominated
2004	Grammy Award	Best Urban/Alternative Performance	Won
2004	Grammy Award	Best Music Video	Nominated
2004	iHeartRadio Much Music Video Awards	Best International Group Video	Won
2004	iHeartRadio Much Music Video Awards	Peoples Choice: Favourite International Group	Nominated
2004	Nickelodeon Kids' Choice Awards	Kids' Choice Award for Favorite Song	Won
2004	MTV Europe Music Awards	Best Song	Won
2004	MTV Europe Music Awards	Best Video	Won
2004	MTV Video Music Award	Video of the Year	Won
2004	MTV Video Music Award	Best Hip-Hop Video	Won
2004	MTV Video Music Award	Best Direction	Nominated
2004	MTV Video Music Award	Best Visual Effects	Won
2004	MTV Video Music Award	Best Art Direction	Won
2004	MTV Video Music Awards Japan	Video of the Year	Nominated
2004	MTV Video Music Awards Japan	Best Pop Video	Nominated
2004	NAACP Image Awards	Outstanding Duo or Group	Won
2004	NAACP Image Awards	Outstanding Music Video	Nominated
2004	NAACP Image Awards	Outstanding Song	Nominated
2004	Soul Train Music Awards	Best Video of the Year	Won

== Legacy ==
"Hey Ya!" was listed at number 15 on Blender's 2005 list of "The 500 Greatest Songs Since You Were Born", and Pitchfork included it in its collection of The Pitchfork 500. Rolling Stone ranked the song at number four on their 2011 list of the "100 Best Songs of the Aughts", and in 2021, ranked it at number 10 on their list of The 500 Greatest Songs of All Time. In 2011, NME placed it at number three on its list of the "150 Best Tracks of the Past 15 Years", and in 2014, ranked it at number 18 on their list of the 500 greatest songs of all time. In 2013, the sports website Grantland named it the best song of the millennium after a March Madness style bracket of 64 songs.

The lyric "shake it like a Polaroid picture", along with the song's commercial success, helped to temporarily revitalize the Polaroid Corporation, which had declared bankruptcy in 2001. Because modern Polaroid film is sealed behind a clear plastic window, casually waving the picture has no effect on the film's development. Vigorously shaking the film may actually distort the image by causing the film to separate prematurely and creating blobs in the final image. Nevertheless, Polaroid sought to capitalize on the allusion, hiring Ryan Berger of the Euro RSCG advertising agency. Polaroid sponsored parties for OutKast at which Euro RSCG distributed Polaroid cameras. OutKast also made a deal to hold Polaroid cameras during some of its performances. While Polaroid did not release sales figures, its public image, which was in decline with the growing popularity of digital cameras, was bolstered by the song. However, despite the welcome exposure, Polaroid eventually discontinued the sale of original Polaroid cameras and film, and again declared bankruptcy in 2008.

The song was used as the namesake of Pocoloco’s Stand ability in Jojo’s Bizarre Adventure, part seven, “Steel Ball Run,” which debuted in 2004.

== Music video ==
=== Background ===
The song's music video, directed by Bryan Barber, is based on the Beatles' landmark appearance on The Ed Sullivan Show on February 9, 1964. However, it sets the action in London. The beginning and end of the video blend with those of "The Way You Move" so that the two can be watched in either order, and a "The Way You Move/Hey Ya!" video combining both clips with a bridging sequence was released on the OutKast: The Videos DVD.

After listening to the song, Barber was inspired to create a video around the Beatles' appearance on Sullivan's show based on the song's musical structure, but André 3000 had never seen this footage. Barber showed the footage to André 3000 and came up with the idea of reversing the British Invasion, by having the American band the Love Below becoming popular on a British television program. The music video was filmed using motion control photography in two days in August 2003 on a sound stage at Universal Studios in Los Angeles, California. The cast included more than 100 women. Each of André 3000's parts was shot several times from different angles, and he performed the song 23 times during the course of filming. Because releasing "Hey Ya!" as a single was a last-minute decision, André did not have time to choreograph the parts, and all of the dancing was improvised. Ice Cold 3000's sequences were the first filmed, resulting in the character's energetic performance, and Johnny Vulture's were the last, so André, exhausted from the previous takes, sat on a stool for those sequences.

=== Synopsis ===
The eight versions of André 3000 in the music video, performing on a set inspired by the Beatles' American debut on The Ed Sullivan Show

In the video, André 3000 plays all eight members of the fictional band The Love Below: keyboardist Benjamin André, bassist Possum Aloysius Jenkins, vocalist André "Ice Cold" 3000, drummer Dookie Blossom Gain III, three backing vocalists the Love Haters, and guitarist Johnny Vulture.

The video opens with the band's manager Antwan (Big Boi) talking to Ice Cold and Dookie backstage. Meanwhile, the television presenter, portrayed by Ryan Phillippe (another version featured an energetic Phillippe), tries to calm a crowd of screaming girls on a show being broadcast live in black-and-white. Afterwards, he introduces the band and they start performing. While the girls in the audience scream loudly, one girl is carried off by security after rushing the stage, and another faints. A family is shown dancing to the broadcast at home. When Ice Cold instructs listeners to "shake it like a Polaroid picture", some of the girls begin taking pictures and shaking them. Ice Cold dances with one of the girls on stage, and the video closes with several friends of the band watching and discussing the performance.

=== Reception ===
The video debuted on MTV's Total Request Live on September 5, 2003, at number 10. It topped the countdown for 19 days and retired at number eight on November 24, having spent 50 days on the program. It was well received by critics, who regarded it as a contemporary piece of post-industrial performance art. At the 2004 MTV Video Music Awards, the video won four awards for Video of the Year, Best Hip-Hop Video, Best Special Effects, and Best Art Direction. It was also nominated for Best Direction but lost to Jay-Z's "99 Problems". "Hey Ya!" was nominated for Best Short Form Music Video at the 46th Grammy Awards, but it lost to Johnny Cash's cover of Nine Inch Nails' "Hurt". In Canada, the video topped MuchMusic's Countdown for the week beginning January 30, 2004, and it won the award for Best International Video by a Group at the 2004 MuchMusic Video Awards. In 2006, Stylus Magazine listed it at number 72 on its "Top 100 Music Videos of All Time", comparing André 3000's dancing to James Brown's performances in the early 1970s.

== Formats and track listings ==
- American 7-inch vinyl single
1. "Hey Ya!" (radio edit)
2. "Hey Ya!" (instrumental)
- Australian CD maxi single
1. "Hey Ya!" (radio edit)
2. "GhettoMusick" (radio edit)
3. "GhettoMusick" (Benny Benassi remix)
4. "Hey Ya!" (Enhanced CD video)
- European CD single
1. "Hey Ya!" (radio edit)
2. "GhettoMusick" (radio edit)
- German CD maxi single
1. "Hey Ya!" (radio edit)
2. "GhettoMusick" (radio edit)
3. "GhettoMusick" (Benny Benassi remix)
4. "Hey Ya!" (Enhanced CD video)
- UK 12-inch vinyl single
1. "Hey Ya!" (radio edit)
2. "GhettoMusick"
3. "My Favourite Things"
- UK CD maxi single
1. "Hey Ya!"
2. "GhettoMusick" (radio edit)
3. "My Favourite Things"
4. "Hey Ya!" (Enhanced CD video)

== Credits and personnel ==
The credits for "Hey Ya!" are adapted from the liner notes of Speakerboxx/The Love Below.

Recording

- Recorded at: Stankonia Studios and Tree Sound Studios in Atlanta, Georgia; Larrabee Sound Studios in Los Angeles, California.

Personnel

- André 3000 – vocals, guitars, keyboards, production, audio programming
- Kevin Kendricks – keyboards
- John Frye – recording engineer
- Pete Novak – recording engineer
- Robert Hannon – recording engineer
- Mike Nicholson – recording engineer
- Josh Monroy – assistant recording engineer
- Warren Bletcher – assistant recording engineer
- Jared Robbins – assistant recording engineer
- Rabeka Tuinei – assistant recording engineer, additional vocals
- Neal Pogue – audio mixer
- Greg Price – assistant audio mixer

== Charts ==
=== Weekly charts ===
2003–2004 weekly chart performance for "Hey Ya!"
Chart (2003–2004)	Peak position
Australia (ARIA)	1
Australian Urban (ARIA)	1
Austria (Ö3 Austria Top 40)	4
Belgium (Ultratop 50 Flanders)	18
Belgium (Ultratop 50 Wallonia)	10
Canada (Nielsen SoundScan)	1
Croatia (HRT)	2
Czech Republic (IFPI)	1
Denmark (Tracklisten)	2
Europe (Eurochart Hot 100)	2
Finland (Suomen virallinen lista)	10
France (SNEP)	7
Germany (GfK)	6
Hungary (Rádiós Top 40)	34
Hungary (Dance Top 40)	5
Ireland (IRMA)	2
Italy (FIMI)	3
Netherlands (Dutch Top 40)	22
Netherlands (Single Top 100)	15
New Zealand (Recorded Music NZ)	2
Norway (VG-lista)	1
Romania (Romanian Top 100)	71
Scottish Singles Sales (Official Charts)	6
Sweden (Sverigetopplistan)	1
Switzerland (Schweizer Hitparade)	9
UK Singles (Official Charts)	3
UK Hip Hop/R&B (Official Charts)	1
US Billboard Hot 100	1
US Adult Pop Airplay (Billboard)	13
US Alternative Airplay (Billboard)	16
US Hot R&B/Hip-Hop Songs (Billboard)	9
US Pop Airplay (Billboard)	1
US Rhythmic Airplay (Billboard)	1

2020 weekly chart performance for "Hey Ya!"
Chart (2020)	Peak position
Poland Airplay (ZPAV)	66

2025 weekly chart performance for "Hey Ya!"
Chart (2025)	Peak position
Jamaica Airplay (JAMMS)	2

=== Year-end charts ===
2003 year-end chart performance for "Hey Ya!"
Chart (2003)	Position
Australia (ARIA)	61
Germany (Media Control GfK)	173
Ireland (IRMA)	57
Italy (FIMI)	43
Sweden (Hitlistan)	9
UK Singles (OCC)	68

2004 year-end chart performance for "Hey Ya!"
Chart (2004)	Position
Australia (ARIA)	15
Australian Urban (ARIA)	5
Austria (Ö3 Austria Top 75)	16
Belgium (Ultratop 40 Wallonia)	35
Brazil (Crowley)	3
Europe (Eurochart Hot 100)	7
France (SNEP)	42
Germany (Media Control GfK)	34
Italy (FIMI)	22
Netherlands (Dutch Top 40)	98
Netherlands (Single Top 100)	84
New Zealand (RIANZ)	47
Sweden (Hitlistan)	33
Switzerland (Schweizer Hitparade)	31
UK Singles (OCC)	25
US Billboard Hot 100	8
US Adult Top 40 (Billboard)	25
US Hot R&B/Hip-Hop Singles & Tracks (Billboard)	49
US Mainstream Top 40 (Billboard)	7
US Modern Rock Tracks (Billboard)	77
US Rhythmic Top 40 (Billboard)	17

=== Decade-end charts ===
Decade-end chart performance for "Hey Ya!"
Chart (2000–2009)	Position
Australia (ARIA)	74
US Billboard Hot 100	20

=== All-time charts ===
All-time chart performance for "Hey Ya!"
Chart (1958–2018)	Position
US Billboard Hot 100	145

== Certifications ==
Certifications and sales for "Hey Ya!"
Region	Certification	Certified units/sales
Australia (ARIA)	11× Platinum	770,000^{‡}
Canada (Music Canada)	Gold	20,000^{*}
Denmark (IFPI Danmark)	2× Platinum	180,000^{‡}
Germany (BVMI)	2× Platinum	600,000^{‡}
Italy (FIMI)	Platinum	50,000^{‡}
New Zealand (RMNZ)	7× Platinum	210,000^{‡}
Norway (IFPI Norway)	Platinum	10,000^{*}
Spain (Promusicae)	Platinum	60,000^{‡}
Sweden (GLF)	Platinum	20,000^{^}
United Kingdom (BPI)	5× Platinum	3,000,000^{‡}
United States (RIAA)	Diamond	10,000,000^{‡}
^{*} Sales figures based on certification alone.^{^} Shipments figures based on certification alone.^{‡} Sales+streaming figures based on certification alone.

== Release history ==
Release dates and formats for "Hey Ya!"
Region	Date	Format(s)	Label(s)	Ref.
United States	August 25, 2003	Contemporary hit; alternative radio	Arista	
Sweden	October 24, 2003	CD	Arista; BMG	
Australia	November 10, 2003	CD	Arista; BMG	
United Kingdom	November 10, 2003	CD	Arista; BMG	

== Other versions ==
The rock influences of "Hey Ya!" have allowed many other artists to release cover versions of the song. In 2006, Mat Weddle, frontman of the unsigned folk band Obadiah Parker, performed an acoustic cover of the song at a local open mic night, and a friend of his posted a video of the performance on YouTube, which quickly became virally popular online. Inspired by slowcore band Red House Painters, Weddle's version moves at a much slower tempo backed by a rhythmic guitar strum and converts the breakdown into a "staccato chime". The cover received international airplay and spawned many other copycat acoustic versions.

An acoustic cover of the song, sung by Sam Lloyd in his role as Ted Buckland appeared in the 2009 season 8 episode of Scrubs titled "My Soul On Fire, Part 2". In 2010, Chris Rock published a spoof video for a parody cover song titled Crackers which was originally produced in 2004. In 2015, Postmodern Jukebox released a Scott Bradlee arrangement of "Hey Ya!" with a big band tempo and 1960s feel. Featuring Sara Niemietz on lead vocals, their version was featured in Billboard magazine, Time magazine online, and the New York Daily News.

English rock band Sleep Token released a cover in 2018 as a single. This version saw lead singer Vessel accompanied solely by piano and only included the first two verses and the chorus.

== See also ==
- List of highest-certified singles in Australia
