= Screechy Peach =

American singer

- Born: Myrna Crenshaw; July 6, 1959; Desoto, Texas, U.S.
- Died: April 1, 2007 (aged 47) Decatur, Georgia, U.S.
- Genres: R&B, Rock, Funk, Hip hop
- Occupation(s): Singer, Songwriter
- Years active: 1993–2007
- Labels: Capitol Records (1994-1996); Whild Peach Music (1998-2007)
- Formerly of: Whild Peach

Myrna Crenshaw Brown (July 6, 1959 – April 1, 2007), best known as Screechy Peach, was an American singer and songwriter.

Initially the lead singer of Whild Peach, alongside her husband, guitarist David Whild, she would acquire fame in the 1990s due to her collaboration with such artists as Outkast and Macy Gray.

== Illness and death ==
In 1996, she was diagnosed with breast cancer. She died from the disease on April 1, 2007, aged 47, in Decatur, Georgia.

The Class of 3000 episode "Too Cool For School" was dedicated to her memory.

== Discography ==
- OutKast - Speakerboxx/The Love Below
  - Co-wrote "Church" & "Bust"
  - Performed on "I Like The Way You Move" "Church", "Bust", "Unhappy", "Ghetto Musick", "Happy Valentine"s Day", "Bowtie" and "War"
- Outkast - Idlewild
  - Wrote & Performed "Mutron Angel"
  - Co-Wrote & Performed on "The Train"
  - Co-Wrote & Performed on "A Bad Note"
- Joi - Tennessee Slim Is The Bomb
  - Performed on "Co Stars"
- Outkast - Aquemini
  - Co-wrote "Liberation"
  - Performed on various tracks
- Khujo Goodie - The Man Not The Dawg
  - Produced, co-wrote & performed on "Pimpz & Hoz" & "Shawtly"
- Pink - "Can"t Take Me Home"
  - Performed on "You Make Me Sick" re-mix
- Raphael Saadiq - Live at the House Of Blues
  - Performed on all tracks
- Big Gipp - Mutant Mindframe
  - Performed on "Creeks"
- Killa Mike - Monster
  - Performed on "A.D.I.D.A.S." and Monster
- Joi - Amoeba Cleansing Syndrome
  - Performed on "U Turn Me On"
- OutKast - Big Boi & Dre Present Outkast Greatest Hits
  - Performed on "The Whole World"
- OutKast - Atliens
  - Co-wrote "You May Die"
  - Performed on various tracks
- Goodie Mob - Still Standing
  - Produced & co-wrote "Just About Over", performed on "Just About Over" & "They Don't Dance No Mo", "I Feel Responsible" and "The Walk"
- Soundtrack - Scooby Doo Original Movie Soundtrack
  - Performed on "Land Of A Million Drums"
- Backbone - "Concrete Law"
  - Performed on "Yes Yes Ya"ll", "Believe That" and "Under Streetlights"
- Soundtrack - Tomb Raider Original Movie Soundtrack
  - Performed on "Speed Ballin"
- Soundtrack - Ali Original Movie Soundtrack
  - Performed on "Set Me Free" & "Death Letter"
- Dungeon Family - Even In Darkness
  - Performed on "Follow The Light" and "Rollin"
- Slimm Calhoun - "The Skinny"
  - Performed on "Dirt Work", "Current Events" and "Red Clay"
- OutKast - Stankonia
  - Performed on various tracks
- Witch Doctor - Witch Doctor
  - Performed on "Goo Goo Eyes"
- Lil Will -
  - Wrote, co-produced, & performed on "I Still Love You", performed on "Georgia Girl"
- Soundtrack - Shaft
  - Performed on "Automatic"
- TLC - Fanmail
  - Performed on "Silly Ho"
- Cool Breeze - East Points Greatest Hits
  - Co-wrote "Ghetto Camelot" Performed on "Ghetto Camelot", "Creatine", "East Pointed" and "The Field"
- Soundtrack - Light It Up Original Movie Soundtrack
  - Performed on "High Schoolin"
- Macy Gray - Macy Gray On How Life Is
  - Performed on "Git Up, Git Out, Git Something"
