= Alicia Keys videography =

Alicia Keys video discography
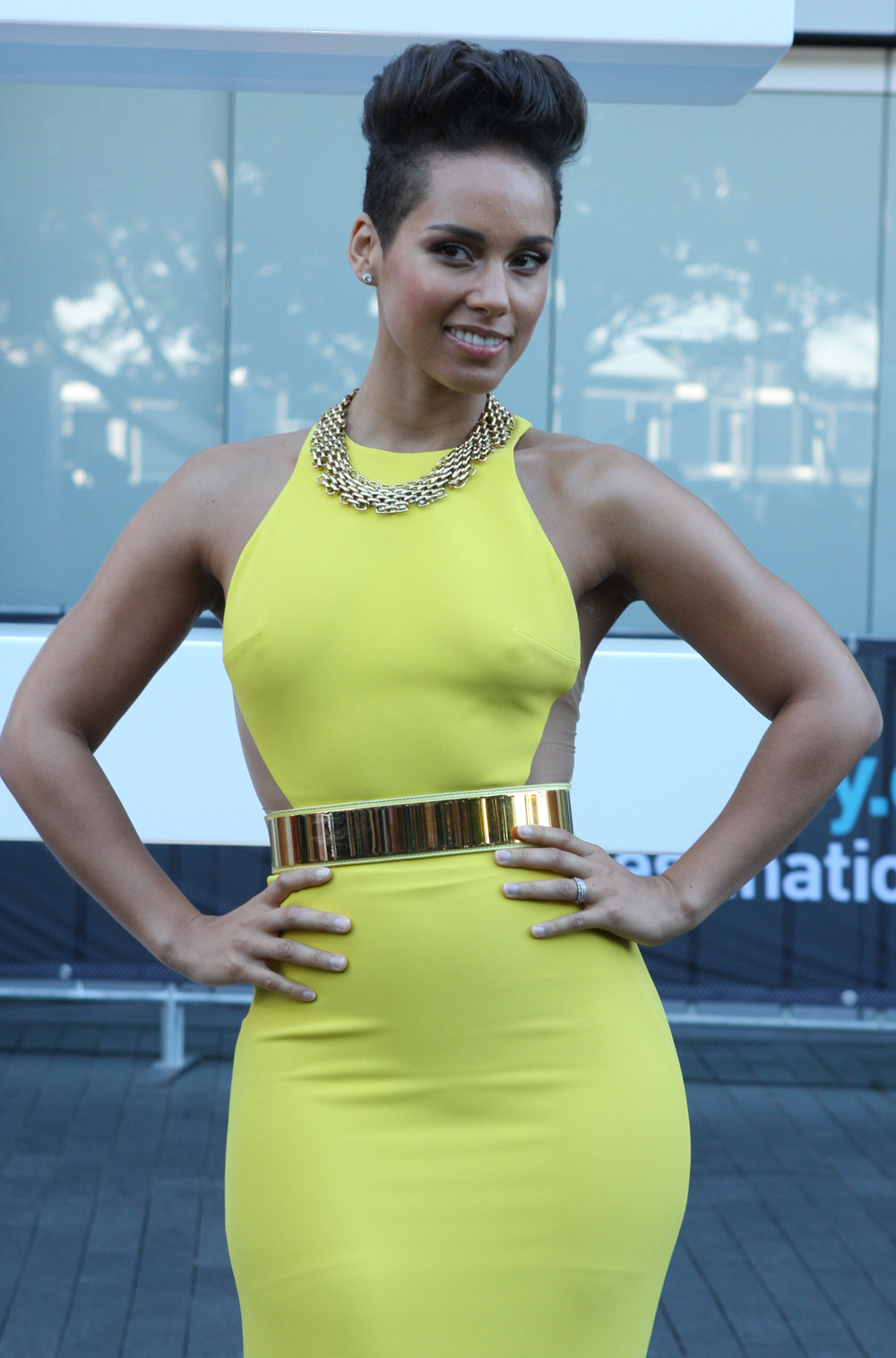
- Keys in Sydney, Australia, at the ARIA Music Awards ceremony, December 2013.
- Music videos: 37
- As featured artist: 8
- Guest appearances/cameos: 5
- Video albums: 3

American recording artist Alicia Keys has appeared in numerous music videos. Her videography includes more than thirty music videos and three video albums. In 2000, Keys signed a recording contract with J Records and released her debut single "Fallin'", taken from her first studio album Songs in A minor (2001). The plot of its music video had Keys traveling to a prison to visit her incarcerated boyfriend and was continued in the video for her next single, "A Woman's Worth;" both videos marked Keys' first collaboration with director Chris Robinson, who would become a regular collaborator later. In 2004, another regular, American director Diane Martel, directed the accompanying music video for the second single from the singer's second album The Diary of Alicia Keys, "If I Ain't Got You", which featured rapper Method Man as Keys' love interest. It won the Best R&B Video accolade at the 2004 MTV Video Music Awards.

In 2008, Keys collaborated with former The White Stripes singer Jack White on "Another Way to Die", the theme song for the James Bond film Quantum of Solace. Inspired by the plot, the CGI-heavy clip garnered a largely positive response from critics and was nominated for Best Short Form Music Video at the 51st Grammy Awards.

== Music videos ==
=== As lead artist ===
Title	Other performer(s)	Director(s)	Album	Year	Ref.
"Fallin'"	—N/a	Chris Robinson	Songs in A Minor	2001	
"A Woman's Worth"	—N/a	Chris Robinson	Songs in A Minor	2001	
"How Come You Don't Call Me"	—N/a	Little X	Songs in A Minor	2002	
"Girlfriend"	—N/a	Patrick Hoelck	Songs in A Minor	2002	
"You Don't Know My Name"	—N/a	Chris Robinson	The Diary of Alicia Keys	2003	
"If I Ain't Got You"	—N/a	Diane Martel	The Diary of Alicia Keys	2004	
"Diary"	Tony! Toni! Toné! Jermaine Paul	Lamont Burrell; Rod Isaacs; Jeff Robinson; Brian Campbell	The Diary of Alicia Keys	2004	
"My Boo"	Usher	Chris Robinson; Usher	Confessions	2004	
"Karma"	—N/a	Chris Robinson; Alicia Keys	The Diary of Alicia Keys	2004	
"Unbreakable"	—N/a	Alex Coletti	Unplugged	2005	
"Every Little Bit Hurts"	—N/a	Justin Francis	Unplugged	2006	
"No One"	—N/a	Justin Francis	As I Am	2007	
"Like You'll Never See Me Again"	—N/a	Diane Martel	As I Am	2007	
"Teenage Love Affair"	—N/a	Chris Robinson	As I Am	2008	
"Superwoman"	—N/a	Chris Robinson	As I Am	2008	
"Another Way to Die"	Jack White	P. R. Brown; MK12	Quantum of Solace	2008	
"Empire State of Mind"	Jay Z	Hype Williams	The Blueprint 3	2009	
"Doesn't Mean Anything"	—N/a	P. R. Brown	The Element of Freedom	2009	
"Try Sleeping with a Broken Heart"	—N/a	Syndrome	The Element of Freedom	2009	
"Un-Thinkable (I'm Ready)"	—N/a	Jake Nava	The Element of Freedom	2010	
"Wait Til You See My Smile"	—N/a	Scott Orr	The Element of Freedom	2010	
"Girl on Fire"	Nicki Minaj	Sophie Muller	Girl on Fire	2012	
"Girl on Fire" (Japanese version)	—N/a	Mika Ninagawa	—N/a	2012	
"Brand New Me"	—N/a	Diane Martel	Girl on Fire	2012	
"Fire We Make"	Maxwell	Chris Robinson	Girl on Fire	2013	
"New Day"	—N/a	Indrani	Girl on Fire	2013	
"Tears Always Win"	—N/a	Robert Hales	Girl on Fire	2013	
"Better You, Better Me"	—N/a	—N/a	—N/a	2013	
"It's On Again"	Kendrick Lamar	Rich Lee	The Amazing Spider-Man 2	2014	
"We Are Here"	—N/a	Sol Guy	—N/a	2014	
"In Common"	—N/a	Pierre Debusschere	Here	2016	
"Blended Family (What You Do for Love)"	ASAP Rocky	Hype Williams	Here	2016	
"That's What's Up"	—N/a	—N/a	—N/a	2017	
"Raise a Man"	—N/a	Bill Kristein	—N/a	2019	
"Calma (Alicia Remix)"	Pedro Capó; Farruko	Edgar Esteves	Gangalee	2019	
"Show Me Love"	Miguel	Cara Stricker	Alicia	2019	
"Show Me Love" (Remix)	21 Savage	Art	—N/a	2019	
"Time Machine"	—N/a	Art Johnson; Cole Cook	Alicia	2019	
"Underdog"	—N/a	Wendy Morgan	Alicia	2020	
"Perfect Way to Die"	—N/a	Chris Robinson	Alicia	2020	
"Underdog (Remix)"	Chronixx; Protoje	—N/a	—N/a	2020	
"So Done"	Khalid	Andy Hines	Alicia	2020	
"Love Looks Better"	—N/a	Gina Prince-Bythewood	Alicia	2020	
"Lala"	Swae Lee	Sylvia M Zakhary; Sing J. Lee	Keys	2021	
"Best of Me"	—N/a	TT The Artist	Keys	2021	
"Old Memories"	—N/a	Sylvia M Zakhary; Sing J. Lee	Keys	2021	
"Only You"	—N/a	Sylvia M Zakhary	Keys	2021	
"Come for Me"	Khalid; Lucky Daye	Alicia Keys	Keys	2021	
"City of Gods"	Fivio Foreign; Kanye West	Tahjay “T Dott” Dobson	Donda 2 B.I.B.L.E.	2022	
"City of Gods (Part II)"	—N/a	Sylvia M Zakhary; Sing J. Lee	—N/a	2022	
"Come for Me"	Khalid; Lucky Daye	Sing J. Lee	Keys	2022	
"Trillions"	Brent Fiyaz	Bobby Banks; Ramon Rivas	Keys II	2022	
"December Back 2 June"	—N/a	Jean Sébastien	Santa Baby	2022	
"Stay"	Lucky Daye	Jean Sébastien; Kamerameha	Keys II	2023	
"If I Ain't Got You (Orchestral Version)"	Queen Charlotte's Global Orchestra	Diane Martel	Queen Charlotte: A Bridgerton Story (Covers from the Netflix Series)	2023	
"Lifeline"	—N/a	Diane Martel	The Color Purple (Music From and Inspired By)	2023	
"Kaleidoscope"	Maleah Joi Moon	Kajal	Hell's Kitchen (Original Broadway Cast Recording)	2024	
"The River"	Amanda Reid	Jared Malik Royal	Hell's Kitchen (Original Broadway Cast Recording)	2025	
"L'Aurora"	Eros Ramazzotti	Giacomo Triglia	Una storia importante	2025	
"La Aurora"	Eros Ramazotti	Giacomo Triglia	Una Historia Importante	2025	

=== As featured artist ===
Title	Other performer(s)	Director(s)	Album	Year	Ref.
"What's Going On"	Various Artists	Jake Scott	What's Going On	2002	
"Brotha Part II"	Angie Stone; Eve	Chris Robinson	Mahogany Soul	2002	
"Gangsta Lovin'"	Eve	Little X	Eve-Olution	2002	
"Ghetto Story Chapter 2"	Cham; Akon	Sanaa Hamri	Ghetto Story	2006	
"Looking for Paradise"	Alejandro Sanz	Gil Green	Paraíso Express	2009	
"International Party"	Swizz Beatz	Chris Robinson	—N/a	2011	
"The Great Curve"	Angelique Kidjo; Questlove; Blood Orange	—N/a	—N/a	2018	

=== Guest appearances ===
Title	Performer(s)	Director(s)	Album	Year	Ref.
"Boy Meets Girl"	Truck Turner	—N/a	Look Both Ways Before You; Cross Me	2002	
"I Want You"	Common	Sanji; Kerry Washington	Finding Forever	2007	
"Glory"	Jay Z	—N/a	—N/a	2015	
"Pistol On My Side (P.O.M.S)"	Swizz Beatz; Lil Wayne	Vincent Lou Film	Poison	2018	
"Beauty in the Benz"	Tory Lanez	child	Chixtape 5	2019	
"Therapy Session/Pelle Coat"	Lil Durk	Steve Cannon	Almost Healed	2023	

== Unreleased music videos ==
Title	Other performer(s)	Director(s)	Album	Year	Ref.
"Put It in a Love Song"	Beyoncé	Melina Matsoukas	The Element of Freedom	2010	
"Brand New Me Part II"	—N/a	Taj Stansberry	—N/a	2013	

== Video albums ==
List of video album DVDs, with certifications
Title	Album details	Certifications
The Diary of Alicia Keys	Released: November 16, 2004; Label: J	
Unplugged	Released: October 11, 2005; Label: J	US: Gold; CAN: Platinum; NL: Gold
VH1 Storytellers	Released: June 25, 2013 (US); Label: RCA	

== Filmography ==
=== Film and television ===
List of television and film credits
Year	Title	Role	Notes
1985	The Cosby Show	Maria (credited as Alicia Cook)	"Slumber Party" (Season 1, Episode 22)
1993	The Adventures of Pete & Pete	Extra	"Tool and Die" (Season 1, Episode 5)
2001	Charmed	P3 VIP Patron (uncredited)	"Size Matters" (Season 4, Episode 5)
2001	Saturday Night Live	Herself; Musical Guest	"Reese Witherspoon/Alicia Keys" (Season 27, Episode 1)
2002	MTV Diary	Herself	
2003	American Dreams	Fontella Bass	"Rescue Me" (Season 2, Episode 6)
2003	The Proud Family	Herself (voice)	"The Good, the Bad, and the Ugly" (Season 3, Episode 46)
2004	2004 Soul Train Music Awards	Host	
2004	How I'm Livin'	Herself	
2004	Live with Regis and Kelly	Co-host	
2005	MTV Asia Aid 2005	Host	
2005	Sesame Street	Herself	Episode #36.26 (Season 36, Episode 26)
2005	MTV Unplugged	Herself; Performer	
2006	The Backyardigans	Mommy Martian (voice)	"Mission to Mars" (Season 2, Episode 1)
2006	Def Poetry Jam	Herself	Season 5, Episode 2
2006	We Are Together	Herself	
2007	Cane	Herself	"One Man Is an Island" (Season 1, Episode 7)
2007	Elmo's Christmas Countdown	Herself	Christmas television special
2007	Smokin' Aces	Georgia Sykes	Debut film
2007	The Nanny Diaries	Lynette	
2007	Iconoclasts	Herself	Season 3, Episode 2
2007	106 & Park	Co-host	Season 6, Episode 99
2008	Dove: Fresh Takes	Alex	Lead role
2008	Alicia in Africa: Journey to the Motherland	Herself	
2008	The Secret Life of Bees	June Boatwright	Nominated – NAACP Image Award for Outstanding Supporting Actress in a Motion Picture
2010	Saturday Night Live	Herself; Musical Guest	"Charles Barkley/Alicia Keys" (Season 35, Episode 11)
2011	Five	Director	Nominated – Directors Guild of America Award
2011	Keep a Child Alive with Alicia Keys	Herself	
2012	Firelight	Executive Producer	
2012	The Conversation with Amanda de Cadenet	Herself	
2012	The X Factor Australia	Herself; Guest Mentor	Season 4
2012	America's Next Top Model	Herself; Special Guest	"The Girl Who Sings For Alicia Keys" (Season 19, Episode 5)
2012	VH1 Storytellers	Herself; Musical Guest	Episode 96
2013	Muscle Shoals	Herself; Performance	
2013	Girl Rising	Narrator	
2013	Oprah's Master Class	Herself	Season 3, Episode 1
2013	The Inevitable Defeat of Mister and Pete	Executive Producer; Composer	
2014	Nas: Time Is Illmatic	Herself	
2014	The Voice	Herself; Mentor	Season 7
2015	American Masters	Herself	"The Women's List" (Season 28, Episode 7)
2015	Shining a Light: Conversations on Race in America	Herself	
2015	Empire	Skye Summers	Season 2
2015	Jem and the Holograms	Herself	Cameo
2016	Saturday Night Live	Herself; Musical Guest	"Brie Larson/Alicia Keys" (Season 41, Episode 19)
2016	Let Me In	Zara	Executive producer
2016–2018	The Voice	Herself; Coach	Season 11–12, 14
2016	The Gospel	Herself	
2016	Here in Times Square	Herself; Performer	
2016	CMT Crossroads	Herself	Episode 58
2016	The Voice of Germany	Herself; Guest Mentor	Season 6
2017	Landmarks Live: Great Performances	Herself: Performer	
2017	Clive Davis: The Soundtrack of Our Lives	Herself	
2017	Carpool Karaoke: The Series	Herself	Episode: "Alicia Keys & John Legend"
2017	Miracle on 42nd Street	Herself	
2019	Hustle	Executive producer	
2019	61st Annual Grammy Awards	Host	
2019	The Late Late Show with James Corden	Host	Episode: "Alicia Keys"
2020	62nd Annual Grammy Awards	Host	
2020	Regular Heroes	Host	Episode 1
2020	Kids, Race and Unity: A Nick News Special	Host	
2020	Work It	Producer	
2020	Song Exploder	Herself	Episode 1
2020	Every Vote Counts: A Celebration of Democracy	Co-host; Co-producer	
2020	Alicia Keys Rocks New Year's Eve	Host; Performer	
2021	American Masters: How It Feels to Be Free	Herself; Executive Producer	Season 35, Episode 1
2021	My Life on MTV	Herself	Season 1, Episode 2
2021	Mary J. Blige's My Life	Herself	
2021	Queen Kidjo	Herself	
2021	Resort to Love	Producer	
2021	Dionne Warwick: Don't Make Me Over	Herself	
2021	A Choice of Weapons: Inspired by Gordon Parks	Executive producer	
2021	KEYS: A Short Film	Herself	
2022	RuPaul's Drag Race	Herself; Special guest judge	Season 14, Episode 2
2022	Runaway	Herself	
2023	Uncharted	Executive producer	
2025	Black Is Beautiful: The Kwame Brathwaite Story	Herself; executive producer	
2026	American Idol	Herself; Guest mentor	Season 24
2026	Alicia Keys: Girl From Hell's Kitchen	Herself	

=== Web ===
Year	Title	Role	Notes	Ref.
2021	Mondogenius	Host		
2021	Noted: Alicia Keys The Untold Stories	Herself	YouTube Originals Special	
TBA	Unwind	Host	YouTube talk show	

=== Theatre ===
List of theatre credits
Year	Title	Role	Ref.
2011	Stick Fly	Producer; composer	
2021	Going Through Life with No Direction	Producer	

=== Commercials ===
Year	Company	Product/Campaign	Ref.
2005	Proactiv	Proactiv Solution	
2007	American Express	Are you a Cardmember?	
2010	Samsung	DualView camera	
2011	Hewlett-Packard	HP Beats	
2012	Reebok	Reebok Classics	
2012	Citi	Citi Private Pass	
2014	Givenchy	Dalia Divin	
2015	Levi's	Women's Denim Collection	
2017	Nike	Equality	
2020	Mercedes-Benz	"Cares For What Matters" for Mercedes-Benz S-Class	
2020	Allstate	Everything's Alright	
