= Alicia Keys discography =

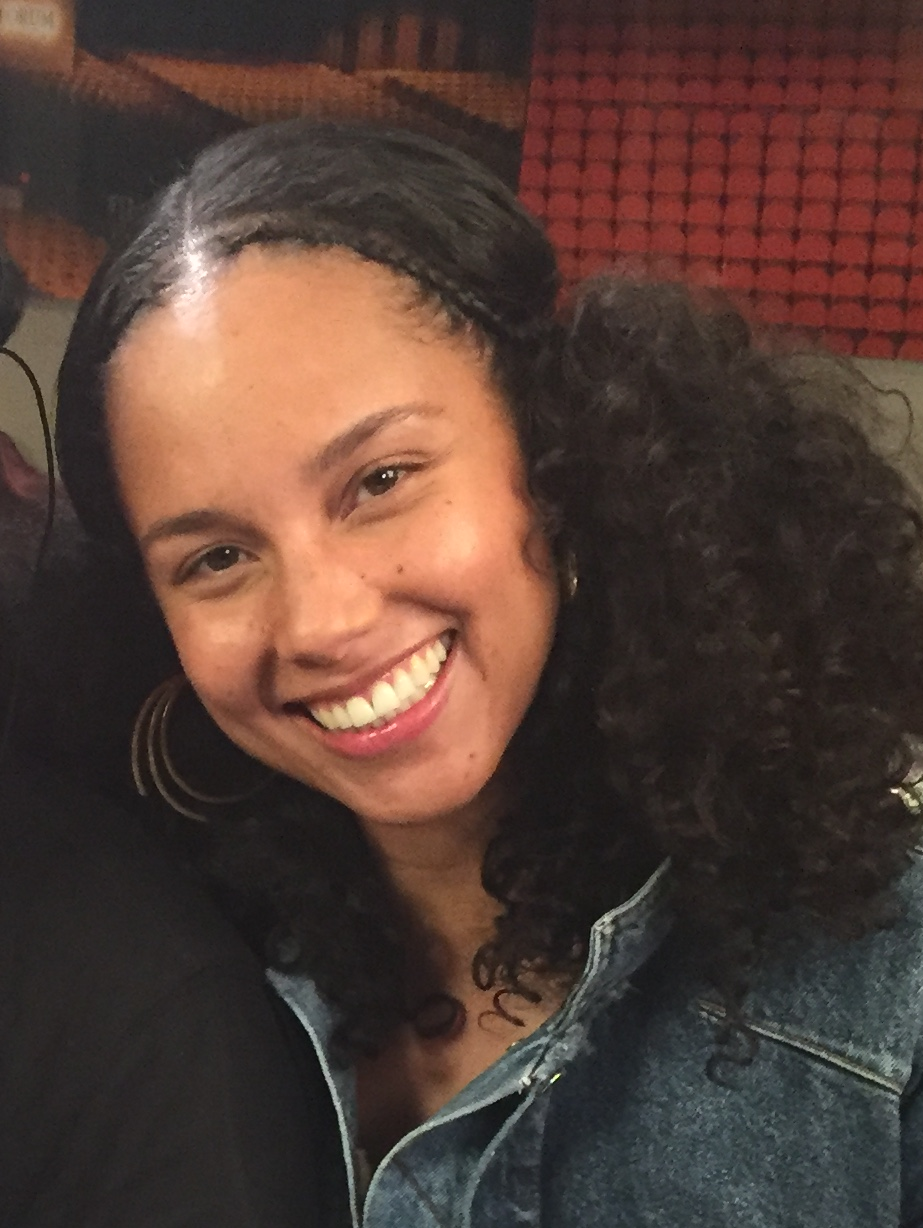
- Keys in 2017
- Studio albums: 9
- Extended plays: 4
- Live albums: 8
- Compilation albums: 1
- Singles: 47
- Guest appearances: 11
- Promotional singles: 6
- Remix albums: 1
- Reissue albums: 6
- Box sets: 7

American singer Alicia Keys has released nine studio albums, eight live albums, one compilation album, one remix album, six reissue albums, four extended plays, seven box sets, 47 singles as lead artist, and six promotional singles. Throughout her career, Keys has sold over 65 million records worldwide. According to Recording Industry Association of America, Keys is the top certified female R&B artist of the millennium, with 20 million certified albums and 38 million certified digital singles in the United States. Billboard ranked her as the second top female artist of the 2000s decade (5th overall), fourth top R&B/hip-Hop female artist of the 2010s decade (26th overall) and the 60th Greatest Artist of all time.

Keys' debut album Songs in A Minor (2001) debuted at number one on the US Billboard 200 and produced the singles "Fallin'", "A Woman's Worth", "How Come You Don't Call Me" and "Girlfriend," the former of which peaked at number one on the US Billboard Hot 100. Songs in A Minor went on to sell over 12 million copies worldwide and made Keys the best-selling new artist and best-selling R&B artist of 2001. Her second studio album, The Diary of Alicia Keys, was released in December 2003 and sold eight million copies worldwide. It became Keys' second consecutive number-one US debut, selling over 618,000 copies its first week of release, becoming the largest first-week sales for a female artist in 2003. Four singles were released from the album, three of which became top-ten singles, including "You Don't Know My Name" and "If I Ain't Got You", the latter of which became the first single by a female artist to remain on the Billboard Hot R&B/Hip-Hop Songs chart for over a year.

In 2005, Keys released her first live album, Unplugged, which again debuted at number one in the United States. She became the first female to have an MTV Unplugged album to debut at number one and the highest since Nirvana in 1994. In 2007, "No One", the lead single from Keys's third studio album, As I Am, was released. Her biggest commercial success since "Fallin'", it remained at the top of the Billboard Hot 100 for five consecutive weeks and became the song most listened to of 2007 in the United States. Selling 742,000 copies in its first week, As I Am gained Keys the largest first week sales of her career and became her fourth consecutive number one album. The album sold five million copies worldwide.

Keys's fourth album The Element of Freedom (2009) became her first non-number one album in the United States and her first number one album in the United Kingdom. The album was certified platinum by the RIAA within its first month of release and produced five singles that attained chart success, including "Doesn't Mean Anything" and "Un-Thinkable (I'm Ready)". Keys's fifth studio album Girl on Fire (2012) sold 159,000 copies in its first week of release in the United States and marked her lowest opening sales for an album. The lead single was the title track, which reached the top ten in several countries worldwide. On November 4, 2016, she released her sixth album Here.

== Albums ==
=== Studio albums ===
List of studio albums, with selected chart positions, sales figures and certifications
Title	Album details	Peak chart positions										Sales	Certifications
Title	Album details	US	AUS	BEL (FL)	CAN	GER	IRL	NL	NZ	SWI	UK	Sales	Certifications
Songs in A Minor	Released: June 5, 2001 (US); Label: J; Formats: CD, LP, digital download	1	3	8	2	2	5	1	4	3	6	US: 7,500,000 (as of 2015); UK: 1,130,868 (as of 2012)	RIAA: 7× Platinum; ARIA: 3× Platinum; BEA: Gold; BPI: 3× Platinum; BVMI: Platinum; IFPI SWI: 2× Platinum; MC: 5× Platinum; NVPI: 2× Platinum; RMNZ: Platinum
The Diary of Alicia Keys	Released: December 2, 2003 (US); Label: J; Formats: CD, LP, digital download	1	22	13	15	10	37	2	25	1	13	US: 4,900,000 (as of 2009)	RIAA: 5× Platinum; ARIA: 2× Platinum; BEA: Gold; BPI: Platinum; BVMI: Platinum; IFPI SWI: Platinum; MC: 2× Platinum; NVPI: Platinum; RMNZ: Platinum
As I Am	Released: November 13, 2007 (US); Label: J; Formats: CD, LP, digital download	1	3	10	2	6	15	2	5	1	11	US: 3,700,000 (as of 2009)	RIAA: 5× Platinum; ARIA: Platinum; BEA: Gold; BPI: 2× Platinum; BVMI: Platinum; IFPI SWI: Platinum; IRMA: Gold; MC: 2× Platinum; NVPI: Gold; RMNZ: 2× Platinum
The Element of Freedom	Released: December 15, 2009 (US); Label: J; Formats: CD, LP, digital download	2	19	11	5	10	9	2	22	1	1	US: 1,650,000 (as of 2014); UK: 977,378 (as of 2012)	RIAA: 2× Platinum; ARIA: Gold; BPI: 3× Platinum; BVMI: Gold; IFPI SWI: Platinum; MC: Platinum; NVPI: Gold; RMNZ: Gold
Girl on Fire	Released: November 26, 2012 (US); Label: RCA; Formats: CD, LP, digital download	1	12	11	8	6	27	7	22	3	13	US: 755,000 (as of 2014)	RIAA: Platinum; ARIA: Gold; BPI: Gold; BVMI: Gold; IFPI SWI: Gold; MC: Gold; NVPI: Platinum; RMNZ: Platinum
Here	Released: November 4, 2016 (US); Label: RCA; Formats: CD, LP, digital download	2	14	12	10	14	27	12	24	5	21	US: 42,000	
Alicia	Released: September 18, 2020 (US); Label: RCA; Formats: CD, LP, digital download	4	13	5	2	14	72	10	38	4	12	US: 51,000	
Keys	Released: December 10, 2021 (US); Label: RCA; Formats: CD, LP, digital download	41	—	92	—	49	—	—	—	18	— (Note: Keys did not enter the UK Albums Chart, but peaked at number 11 on the Official UK Hip Hop and R&B Albums Chart Top 40 and number 9 on the UK Digital Albums Chart.)		
Santa Baby	Released: November 4, 2022; Label: Alicia Keys Records; Formats: CD, LP, digital download	148	—	—	—	—	—	—	—	—	— (Note: Santa Baby did not enter the UK Albums Chart, but peaked at number 24 on the UK Digital Albums chart Top 40)		
"—" denotes a recording that did not chart.

=== Live albums ===
List of live albums, with selected chart positions, sales figures and certifications
Title	Album details	Peak chart positions										Sales	Certifications
Title	Album details	US	AUS	BEL (FL)	CAN	GER	IRL	NL	NZ	SWI	UK	Sales	Certifications
Unplugged	Released: October 11, 2005 (US); Label: J; Formats: CD, digital download	1	33	14	8	25	49	2	28	7	52	US: 1,000,000	RIAA: Platinum; BPI: Silver; BVMI: Gold; MC: Gold; NVPI: Gold
VH1 Storytellers	Released: June 25, 2013 (US); Label: RCA; Formats: CD, digital download	108	—	—	—	42	—	—	—	35	—		
Verzuz: Alicia Keys x John Legend (Live)	Released: June 19, 2020; Format: Digital download	—	—	—	—	—	—	—	—	—	—		
Apple Music Live: Alicia Keys	Released: December 22, 2022; Label: Alicia Keys Records; Format: streaming, digital download	—	—	—	—	—	—	—	—	—	—		
Inesquecivel Sao Paulo Brazil (Live from Allianz Park Sao Paulo Brazil)	Released: May 9, 2023; Label: Alicia Keys Records; Format: Digital download	—	—	—	—	—	—	—	—	—	—		
Inolvidable Buenos Aires Argentina (Live from Movistar Arena Buenos Aires, Argentina)	Released: May 13, 2023; Label: Alicia Keys Records; Format: Digital download	—	—	—	—	—	—	—	—	—	—		
Inolvidable Santiago Chile (Live from Movistar Arena Santiago, Chile)	Released: May 24, 2023; Label: Alicia Keys Records; Format: Digital download	—	—	—	—	—	—	—	—	—	—		
Inolvidable Bogota Colombia (Live from Movistar Arena Bogota, Colombia)	Released: May 31, 2023; Label: Alicia Keys Records; Format: Digital download	—	—	—	—	—	—	—	—	—	—		
Inolvidable Mexico City Mexico (Live from Auditorio Nacional Mexico City, Mexico)	Released: June 13, 2023; Label: Alicia Keys Records; Format: Digital download	—	—	—	—	—	—	—	—	—	—		
"—" denotes a recording that did not chart.

=== Reissue albums ===
List of reissue albums with selected chart positions
Title	Album details	Peak chart positions
Title	Album details	NL
Remixed & Unplugged in A Minor	Released: October 28, 2002; Label: J; Format: CD	—
As I Am: The Super Edition	Released: November 10, 2008; Label: J; Formats: CD, digital download	—
Songs in A Minor – 10th Anniversary Edition	Released: June 28, 2011; Label: J; Formats: CD, digital download	69
Girl on Fire: Australian Tour Edition	Released: November 29, 2013; Label: Sony Music; Format: CD	—
Songs in A Minor – 20th Anniversary Edition	Released: June 4, 2021; Label: Sony Music; Formats: LP, digital download	—
Keys II	Released: August 12, 2022; Label: RCA; Formats: CD, LP, digital download	—
The Diary of Alicia Keys 20	Released: December 1, 2023; Label: RCA; Formats: LP, digital download	—
"—" denotes a recording that did not chart.

=== Box sets ===
List of box sets, with selected chart positions and certifications
Title	Album details	Peak chart positions			Certifications
Title	Album details	IRL	SWI	UK	Certifications
Coffret 2 CD: Unplugged / The Diary of Alicia Keys	Released: November 21, 2005; Label: J	—	—	—	
Songs in A Minor / The Diary of Alicia Keys	Released: October 2, 2006; Label: J	—	—	—	
The Platinum Collection	Released: May 4, 2010 (US); Label: J	45	75	20	BPI: Silver
Unplugged / As I Am	Released: October 9, 2010; Label: Sony	—	—	—	
The Collection	Released: December 13, 2011; Label: J, Legacy	—	—	—	
As I Am / The Element of Freedom	Released: July 2, 2013; Label: J	—	—	—	
The Element of Freedom / Girl on Fire	Released: August 14, 2015; Label: Legacy	—	—	—	
"—" denotes a recording that did not chart or was not released in that territory.

=== Remix albums ===
List of remix albums
Title	Album details
Remixed	Released: August 12, 2008 (JPN); Label: J; Format: CD, digital download

=== Compilation albums ===
List of compilation albums
Title	Album details	Peak chart positions
Title	Album details	JPN
The Best of Alicia Keys	Released: July 31, 2025 (Japan only); Label: Sony Japan; Format: CD, digital download	50
Alicia Keys Tokyo Solo Show in 2025	Released: October 8, 2025; Label: RCA; Format: Digital download	—

== Extended plays ==
List of extended plays
Title	EP details
Vault Playlist, Vol. 1	Released: April 7, 2017; Label: RCA; Format: Digital download
Alicia: The Selects	Released July 30, 2021; Label: RCA; Format: Digital download, streaming
Sweet Dreams	Released: November 28, 2021; Label: RCA; Format: Digital download
Alicia Keys: Rehearsal Room	Released: January 23, 2024; Label: Sony Music Entertainment; Format: Digital download

== Singles ==
=== As lead artist ===
List of singles as lead artist, with selected chart positions and certifications, showing year released and album name
Title	Year	Peak chart positions										Certifications	Album
Title	Year	US	AUS	BEL (FL)	CAN	GER	IRL	NL	NZ	SWI	UK	Certifications	Album
"Fallin'"	2001	1	7	1	24	2	3	1	1	2	3	RIAA: 4× Platinum; ARIA: 3× Platinum; BEA: Platinum; BPI: Platinum; BVMI: Platinum; IFPI SWI: Platinum; NVPI: Platinum; RMNZ: 2× Platinum	Songs in A Minor
"A Woman's Worth"	2001	7	16	31	—	45	25	22	5	32	18	RIAA: Gold; ARIA: Gold	Songs in A Minor
"How Come You Don't Call Me"	2002	59	29	— (Note: "How Come U Don't Call Me Anymore?" did not enter the Belgian (FL) Ultratop 50 Singles chart, but peaked at number 9 on the Ultratip chart.)	—	80	32	73	—	60	26		Songs in A Minor
"Girlfriend"	2002	—	13	— (Note: "Girlfriend" did not enter the Belgian (FL) Ultratop 50 Singles chart, but peaked at number 17 on the Ultratip chart.)	—	100	40	18	—	—	24		Songs in A Minor
"You Don't Know My Name"	2003	3	—	— (Note: "You Don't Know My Name" did not enter the Belgian (FL) Ultratop 50 Singles chart, but peaked at number 2 on the Ultratip chart.)	—	68	33	20	—	26	19	BPI: Silver; RIAA: Platinum; RMNZ: Platinum	The Diary of Alicia Keys
"If I Ain't Got You"	2004	4	—	— (Note: "If I Ain't Got You" did not enter the Belgian (FL) Ultratop 50 Singles chart, but peaked at number 10 on the Ultratip chart.)	—	81	44	11	—	35	18	RIAA: 7× Platinum; ARIA: 4× Platinum; BPI: 2× Platinum; BVMI: Gold; RMNZ: 4× Platinum	The Diary of Alicia Keys
"Diary" (featuring Tony! Toni! Toné!)	2004	8	—	—	—	—	—	—	—	—	—	RIAA: Platinum	The Diary of Alicia Keys
"My Boo" (with Usher)	2004	1	—	21	—	4	7	6	—	3	5	RIAA: 5× Platinum; BPI: Platinum; BVMI: Gold; MC: Platinum; RMNZ: 4× Platinum	Confessions
"Karma"	2004	20	—	40	—	62	—	40	—	71	—	RIAA: Gold	The Diary of Alicia Keys
"Unbreakable"	2005	34	—	—	—	—	—	45	—	—	—		Unplugged
"Don't Give Up (Africa)" (with Bono)	2005	— (Note: "Don't Give Up (Africa)" did not enter the Billboard Hot 100, but peaked at number 16 on the Bubbling Under Hot 100 chart, which acts as an extension to the Hot 100.)	—	—	—	—	—	—	—	—	—		Non-album single
"No One"	2007	1	3	4	2	3	8	4	2	1	6	RIAA: Diamond; ARIA: 6× Platinum; BEA: Gold; BPI: 3× Platinum; BVMI: Gold; MC: 2× Platinum; RMNZ: 5× Platinum	As I Am
"Like You'll Never See Me Again"	2007	12	77	— (Note: "Like You'll Never See Me Again" did not enter the Belgian (FL) Ultratop 50 Singles chart, but peaked at number 17 on the Ultratip chart.)	—	63	48	84	—	—	53	RIAA: Platinum	As I Am
"Teenage Love Affair"	2008	54	—	—	—	—	—	—	21	—	199		As I Am
"Superwoman"	2008	82	57	—	—	43	—	75	—	48	128	RIAA: Gold	As I Am
"Another Way to Die" (with Jack White)	2008	81	29	10	15	8	12	48	15	4	9	ARIA: Gold; BPI: Silver	Quantum of Solace
"Empire State of Mind" (with Jay-Z)	2009	1	4	4	3	11	2	2	6	4	2	RIAA: Diamond; ARIA: 3× Platinum; BEA: Platinum; BPI: 3× Platinum; BVMI: 3× Gold; RMNZ: 6× Platinum	The Blueprint 3
"Doesn't Mean Anything"	2009	60	96	— (Note: "Doesn't Mean Anything" did not enter the Belgian (FL) Ultratop 50 Singles chart, but peaked at number 10 on the Ultratip chart.)	66	8	34	43	22	5	8	RIAA: Gold; BPI: Silver	The Element of Freedom
"Try Sleeping with a Broken Heart"	2009	27	—	— (Note: "Try Sleeping with a Broken Heart" did not enter the Belgian (FL) Ultratop 50 Singles chart, but peaked at number 12 on the Ultratip chart.)	37	33	22	44	12	21	7	RIAA: Platinum; BPI: Platinum; MC: Gold	The Element of Freedom
"Put It in a Love Song" (featuring Beyoncé)	2010	— (Note: "Put It in a Love Song" did not enter the Billboard Hot 100, but peaked at number two on the Bubbling Under Hot 100 chart, which acts as an extension to the Hot 100.)	18	—	71	—	26	—	24	—	—	ARIA: Platinum	The Element of Freedom
"Empire State of Mind (Part II) Broken Down"	2010	55	75	— (Note: "Empire State of Mind (Part II) Broken Down" did not enter the Belgian (FL) Ultratop 50 Singles chart, but peaked at number 18 on the Ultratip chart.)	40	35	8	6	—	19	4	RIAA: Platinum; ARIA: 2× Platinum; BPI: 2× Platinum; BVMI: 3× Gold; RMNZ: Platinum	The Element of Freedom
"Un-Thinkable (I'm Ready)"	2010	21	—	—	—	—	—	—	—	—	—	RIAA: 4× Platinum; BPI: Silver; RMNZ: Gold	The Element of Freedom
"Wait Til You See My Smile"	2010	—	—	—	—	—	—	—	—	—	—		The Element of Freedom
"Girl on Fire" (solo or featuring Nicki Minaj)	2012	11	12	6	6	4	11	5	7	5	5	RIAA: 8× Platinum; ARIA: 6× Platinum; BEA: Gold; BPI: 2× Platinum; BVMI: Platinum; IFPI SWI: Platinum; MC: 2× Platinum; NVPI: Gold; RMNZ: 3× Platinum	Girl on Fire
"Brand New Me"	2012	— (Note: "Brand New Me" did not enter the Billboard Hot 100, but peaked at number three on the Bubbling Under Hot 100 chart, which acts as an extension to the Hot 100.)	—	— (Note: "Brand New Me" did not enter the Belgian (FL) Ultratop 50 Singles chart, but peaked at number 18 on the Ultratip chart.)	—	—	—	64	—	—	92	RIAA: Gold	Girl on Fire
"New Day"	2013	—	—	— (Note: "New Day" did not enter the Belgian (FL) Ultratop 50 Singles chart, but peaked at number 14 on the Ultratip chart.)	—	—	—	—	—	—	—		Girl on Fire
"Fire We Make" (with Maxwell)	2013	— (Note: "Fire We Make" did not enter the Billboard Hot 100, but peaked at number five on the Bubbling Under Hot 100 chart, which acts as an extension to the Hot 100.)	—	—	—	—	—	—	—	—	—	RIAA: Gold	Girl on Fire
"Tears Always Win"	2013	—	—	— (Note: "Tears Always Win" did not enter the Belgian (FL) Ultratop 50 Singles chart, but peaked at number 67 on the Ultratip chart.)	—	—	—	—	—	—	—		Girl on Fire
"It's On Again" (featuring Kendrick Lamar)	2014	—	81	— (Note: "It's On Again" did not enter the Belgian (FL) Ultratop 50 Singles chart, but peaked at number 16 on the Ultratip chart.)	—	95	—	—	—	—	31		The Amazing Spider-Man 2
"We Are Here"	2014	—	—	— (Note: "We Are Here" did not enter the Belgian (FL) Ultratop 50 Singles chart, but peaked at number 43 on the Ultratip chart.)	—	—	—	—	—	32	—		Non-album singles
"28 Thousand Days"	2015	—	—	—	—	—	—	—	—	—	—		Non-album singles
"In Common"	2016	— (Note: "In Common" did not enter the Billboard Hot 100, but peaked at number 4 on the Bubbling Under Hot 100 chart, which acts as an extension to the Hot 100.)	—	— (Note: "In Common" did not enter the Belgian (FL) Ultratop 50 Singles chart, but peaked at number 23 on the Ultratip chart.)	—	—	—	—	—	—	89	RIAA: Gold	Here
"Back to Life"	2016	—	—	—	—	—	—	—	—	—	—		Queen of Katwe
"Blended Family (What You Do for Love)" (featuring A$AP Rocky)	2016	—	— (Note: "Blended Family" did not enter the Hot R&B/Hip-Hop Songs chart, but peaked at number eight on the Bubbling Under R&B/Hip-Hop Singles chart.)	—	—	—	—	—	— (Note: "Blended Family (What You Do for Love)" did not enter the NZ Top 40 Singles Chart, but peaked at number nine on the NZ Heatseeker Singles Chart.)	85	—		Here
"Us" (with James Bay)	2018	—	—	—	—	—	—	—	—	—	—		Non-album singles
"Raise a Man"	2019	—	—	—	—	—	—	—	—	—	—		Non-album singles
"Calma (Alicia Remix)" (with Pedro Capó and Farruko)	2019	71	—	—	—	—	—	—	—	—	—		Gangalee
"Show Me Love" (with Miguel)	2019	90	—	—	—	—	—	—	— (Note: "Show Me Love" did not enter the NZ Top 40 Singles Chart, but peaked at number 17 on the NZ Hot Singles Chart.)	—	—	RIAA: Platinum	Alicia
"Time Machine"	2019	—	—	—	—	—	—	—	—	—	—		Alicia
"Underdog"	2020	69	— (Note: "Underdog" did not enter the ARIA Singles Chart, but peaked at number 36 on the ARIA Digital Track Chart.)	13	— (Note: "Underdog" did not enter the Canadian Hot 100 but peaked at number 23 on the Canadian Digital Song Sales component chart.)	24	—	41	— (Note: "Underdog" did not enter the NZ Top 40 Singles Chart, but peaked at number seven on the NZ Hot Singles Chart.)	21	—	RIAA: Platinum; BVMI: Gold; IFPI SWI: Gold; MC: Gold; RMNZ: Gold	Alicia
"Good Job"	2020	— (Note: "Good Job" did not enter the US Billboard Hot 100 but peaked at number 20 on the Digital Song Sales component chart.)	—	—	— (Note: "Good Job" did not enter the Canadian Hot 100 but peaked at number 42 on the Canadian Digital Song Sales component chart.)	—	—	—	—	—	—		Alicia
"Perfect Way to Die"	2020	—	—	—	—	—	—	—	—	—	—		Alicia
"So Done" (featuring Khalid)	2020	—	—	—	—	—	—	—	— (Note: "So Done" did not enter the NZ Top 40 Singles Chart, but peaked at number 10 on the NZ Hot Singles Chart.)	—	—		Alicia
"Love Looks Better"	2020	—	—	—	—	—	—	—	—	—	—		Alicia
"A Beautiful Noise" (with Brandi Carlile)	2020	— (Note: "A Beautiful Noise" did not enter the US Billboard Hot 100 but peaked at number eight on the Digital Song Sales component chart.)	—	—	— (Note: "A Beautiful Noise" did not enter the Canadian Hot 100 but peaked at number 50 on the Canadian Digital Song Sales component chart.)	—	—	—	—	—	—		Alicia
"Lala" (featuring Swae Lee)	2021	—	—	—	—	—	—	—	—	—	—		Keys
"Best of Me"	2021	—	—	—	—	—	—	—	—	—	—		Keys
"City of Gods" (with Fivio Foreign and Kanye West)	2022	46	66	—	20	—	36	—	— (Note: "City of Gods" did not enter the NZ Top 40 Singles Chart, but peaked at number four on the NZ Hot Singles Chart.)	91	58	RIAA: Gold	B.I.B.L.E. and Donda 2
"City of Gods (Part II)"	2022	—	—	—	—	—	—	—	—	—	—		Non-album single
"Trillions" (featuring Brent Faiyaz)	2022	—	—	—	—	—	—	—	—	—	—		Keys II
"December Back 2 June"	2022	—	—	—	—	—	—	—	—	—	—		Santa Baby
"Come for Me" (featuring Khalid and Lucky Daye)	2023	—	—	—	—	—	—	—	—	—	—		Keys
"If I Ain't Got You" (Orchestral Version) (featuring Queen Charlotte's Global Orchestra)	2023	—	—	—	—	—	—	—	—	—	—		Queen Charlotte: A Bridgerton Story (Covers from the Netflix Series)
"Golden Child"	2023	—	—	—	—	—	—	—	—	—	—		The Diary Of Alicia Keys 20
"Lifeline"	2023	—	—	—	—	—	—	—	—	—	—		The Color Purple (Music from and Inspired By)
"Kaleidoscope" (featuring Maleah Joi Moon)	2024	—	—	—	—	—	—	—	—	—	—		Hell's Kitchen Soundtrack
"Finally" (with Swedish House Mafia)	2024	—	—	—	—	—	—	—	— (Note: "Finally" did not enter the NZ Top 40 Singles Chart, but peaked at number 18 on the NZ Hot Singles Chart.)	—	—		Non-album single
"—" denotes a recording that did not chart or was not released in that territory.

=== As featured artist ===
List of singles as featured artist, with selected chart positions and certifications, showing year released and album name
Title	Year	Peak chart positions										Certifications	Album
Title	Year	US	AUS	BEL (FL)	CAN	GER	IRL	NL	NZ	SWI	UK	Certifications	Album
"Brotha Part II" (Angie Stone featuring Alicia Keys and Eve)	2001	—	—	— (Note: "Brotha Part II" did not enter the Belgian (FL) Ultratop 50 Singles chart, but peaked at number 5 on the Ultratip chart.)	—	—	45	49	—	—	37		Mahogany Soul
"What's Going On" (among Artists Against AIDS Worldwide)	2001	27	—	—	—	35	—	—	—	16	6		What's Going On: All-Star Tribute
"Gangsta Lovin'" (Eve featuring Alicia Keys)	2002	2	4	18	—	21	15	8	7	6	6	ARIA: Platinum; BPI: Silver; RMNZ: Platinum	Eve-Olution
"Ghetto Story Chapter 2" (Cham featuring Alicia Keys)	2006	77	—	—	—	—	—	—	—	—	62		Ghetto Story
"Looking for Paradise" (Alejandro Sanz featuring Alicia Keys)	2009	— (Note: "Looking for Paradise" did not enter the Billboard Hot 100, but peaked at number five on the Bubbling Under Hot 100 chart, which acts as an extension to the Hot 100.)	—	—	—	—	—	—	—	—	—		Paraíso Express
"International Party" (Swizz Beatz featuring Alicia Keys)	2011	—	—	—	—	—	—	—	—	—	—		Non-album singles
"New Day" (50 Cent featuring Dr. Dre and Alicia Keys)	2012	79	44	—	43	53	—	92	—	—	—		Non-album singles
"I'll Always Walk Beside You" (Richie Sambora featuring Alicia Keys, Luke Ebbin, Aaron Sterling and Curt Schneider)	2012	—	—	—	—	—	—	—	—	—	—		Non-album singles
"I Will Pray (Pregherò)" (Giorgia featuring Alicia Keys)	2013	—	—	—	—	—	—	—	—	—	—		Senza paura
"Say Her Name (Hell You Talmbout)" (Janelle Monáe featuring Kimberlé Crenshaw, Beyoncé, Alicia Keys, Chloe x Halle, Tierra Whack, Isis V, Zoë Kravitz, Brittany Howard, Asiahn, Mj Rodriguez, Jovian Zayne, Angela Rye, Nikole Hannah-Jones, Brittany Packnett Cunningham and Alicia Garza)	2021	—	—	—	—	—	—	—	—	—	—		Non-album single
"L'Aurora / La Aurora" (Eros Ramazzotti featuring Alicia Keys)	2025	—	—	—	—	—	—	—	—	—	—		Una storia importante
"—" denotes a recording that did not chart or was not released in that territory.

=== Promotional singles ===
List of promotional singles showing year released and album name
Title	Year	Album
"Every Little Bit Hurts"	2006	Unplugged
"Not Even the King"	2012	Girl on Fire
"We Gotta Pray"	2014	Non-album single
"Hallelujah"	2016	Here
"Holy War"	2016	Here
"Ave Maria (The Voice Performance)" (with Wé McDonald)	2016	Non-album singles
"Diamonds and Pearls (The Voice Performance)" (with Chris Blue)	2017	Non-album singles
"The Christmas Song"	2019	Non-album singles
"Wasted Energy (Remix)" (featuring Kaash Paige and Diamond Platnumz)	2020	Alicia

== Other charted songs ==
List of songs, with selected chart positions, showing year released and album name
Title	Year	Peak chart positions					Album
Title	Year	US	US AC	US R&B/ HH	CAN Dig.	FRA	Album
"Jane Doe"	2001	—	—	— (Note: "Jane Doe" did not enter the US Hot R&B/Hip-Hop Songs chart, but peaked at number 14 on the Bubbling Under R&B/Hip-Hop Songs chart.)	—	—	Songs in A Minor
"Streets of New York" (featuring Nas and Rakim)	2003	—	—	— (Note: "Streets of New York" did not enter the US Hot R&B/Hip-Hop Songs chart, but peaked at number 22 on the Bubbling Under R&B/Hip-Hop Songs chart.)	—	—	The Diary of Alicia Keys
"Lesson Learned" (featuring John Mayer)	2007	— (Note: "Lesson Learned" did not enter the Billboard Hot 100, but peaked at number 4 on the Bubbling Under Hot 100 chart, which acts as an extension to the Hot 100.)	–	—	68	—	As I Am
"How It Feels to Fly"	2009	—	—	— (Note: "How It Feels to Fly" did not enter the US Hot R&B/Hip-Hop Songs chart, but peaked at number 16 on the Bubbling Under R&B/Hip-Hop Songs chart.)	—	—	The Element of Freedom
"Fireworks" (Drake featuring Alicia Keys)	2010	71	—	— (Note: "Fireworks" did not enter the US Hot R&B/Hip-Hop Songs chart, but peaked at number 17 on the Bubbling Under R&B/Hip-Hop Songs chart.)	—	—	Thank Me Later
"Speechless" (featuring Eve)	2010	—	—	71	—	—	Monster Monday Volume One
"Know Who You Are" (with Pharrell Williams)	2014	—	—	—	—	76	G I R L
"Powerful" (Empire Cast featuring Jussie Smollett and Alicia Keys)	2015	— (Note: "Powerful" did not enter the Billboard Hot 100, but peaked at number 12 on the Bubbling Under Hot 100 chart, which acts as an extension to the Hot 100.)	—	36	—	152	Empire: Original Soundtrack Season 2 Volume 1
"Holy War"	2016	—	—	—	—	130	Here
"Like Home" (Eminem featuring Alicia Keys)	2017	— (Note: "Like Home" did not enter the Billboard Hot 100, but peaked at number 4 on the Bubbling Under Hot 100 chart, which acts as an extension to the Hot 100.)	—	46	42	125	Revival
"Morning Light" (Justin Timberlake featuring Alicia Keys)	2018	— (Note: "In Common" did not enter the Billboard Hot 100, but peaked at number 4 on the Bubbling Under Hot 100 chart, which acts as an extension to the Hot 100.)	—	—	—	—	Man of the Woods
"Ghetto Gatsby" (Brent Faiyaz featuring Alicia Keys)	2022	91	—	25	—	—	Wasteland
"Please Come Home for Christmas"	2022	—	24	—	—	—	Santa Baby
"—" denotes a recording that did not chart.

== Guest appearances ==
List of non-single guest appearances, with other performing artists, showing year released and album name
Title	Year	Other performer(s)	Album
"Someday at Christmas" among Voices of Soul	1996	Voices of Soul	12 Soulful Nights of Christmas
"Little Drummer Girl"	1996	none	12 Soulful Nights of Christmas
"At the Club (Interlude)"	2000	Ice Cold	Unrestricted
"Mr. Man"	2001	Jimmy Cozier	Jimmy Cozier
"Someday We'll All Be Free"	2001	none	America: A Tribute to Heroes
"Boy Meets Girl"	2002	Truck Turner	Look Both Ways Before You Cross Me
"Impossible"	2002	Christina Aguilera	Stripped
"Warrior Song"	2002	Nas	God's Son
"2 Train"	2002	Mario	Mario
"Put Me On"	2002	Mario	Mario
"Someday We'll All Be Free"	2003	none	Sessions @ AOL
"America the Beautiful"	2005	Ray Charles	Genius & Friends
"If This World Were Mine"	2005	Jermaine Paul	So Amazing: An All-Star Tribute to Luther Vandross
"Gravity"	2006	John Mayer	Continuum
"Djin Djin"	2007	Angélique Kidjo, Branford Marsalis	Djin Djin
"Almost Everything Is Boinga"	2008	The Backyardigans	The Backyardigans: Born To Play
"Everybody Hurts"	2009	Annie Lennox	The Annie Lennox Collection
"Send Me an Angel"	2010	none	Hope for Haiti Now
"Fireworks"	2010	Drake	Thank Me Later
"All of the Lights"	2010	Kanye West	My Beautiful Dark Twisted Fantasy
"I'm Yours"	2011	R J Small	R J Small Compilation, Vol. 1
"Where's the Fun in Forever?"	2012	Miguel	Kaleidoscope Dream
"Empire State of Mind (Part II) Broken Down (Live)"	2012	none	12-12-12: The Concert for Sandy Relief
"No One (Live)"	2012	none	12-12-12: The Concert for Sandy Relief
"Know Who You Are"	2014	Pharrell Williams	G I R L
"Little Drummer Girl Remix"	2015	none	A Classic Holiday... Presented by MBK
"That Would Be Enough"	2016	none	The Hamilton Mixtape
"Nobody"	2017	DJ Khaled, Nicki Minaj	Grateful
"Like Home"	2017	Eminem	Revival
"The Great Curve"	2018	Angélique Kidjo, Questlove, Blood Orange	none
"Morning Light"	2018	Justin Timberlake	Man of the Woods
"For All We Know"	2019	none	Live 8 (Live, July 2005)
"Truth"	2019	Mark Ronson, The Last Artful, Dodgr	Late Night Feelings
"Winter Time"	2020	Sabrina Claudio	Christmas Blues
"Hold Me Down"	2021	DMX	Exodus
"Intro"	2021	Khalid	Scenic Drive
"Ghetto Gatsby"	2022	Brent Faiyaz	Wasteland
"Therapy Session"	2023	Lil Durk	Almost Healed
"I'm Not the Only One"	2024	Sam Smith	In the Lonely Hour (10th Anniversary Edition)
"Other Side of Love (Remix)"	2025	Coco Jones	Why Not More?

== Production discography ==
List of production (non-performing) credits for other artists, excluding interpolations and samples.
Track(s)	Year	Credit	Artist(s)	Album
"Intro"	2001	Piano	Truck Turner	Look Both Ways Before You Cross Me
"Warrior Song"	2002	Producer	Nas	God's Son
"2 Train"	2002	Producer	Mario	Mario
"Put Me On"	2002	Songwriter	Mario	Mario
"Impossible"	2002	Producer	Christina Aguilera	Stripped
"Million Dollar Bill"	2009	Producer	Whitney Houston	I Look to You
"All of the Lights"	2010	Additional vocals	Kanye West	My Beautiful Dark Twisted Fantasy
"Lost in the World"	2010	Additional vocals	Kanye West	My Beautiful Dark Twisted Fantasy
"Who Will Survive in America"	2010	Additional vocals	Kanye West	My Beautiful Dark Twisted Fantasy
"Angel"	2011	Producer	Jennifer Hudson	I Remember Me
"Everybody Needs Love"	2011	Producer	Jennifer Hudson	I Remember Me
"Don't Look Down"	2011	Producer	Jennifer Hudson	I Remember Me
"Say Its So"	2011	Additional vocals	Mateo	Love & Stadiums
"Hope"	2012	Producer	Emile Sandé	Our Version of Events
"Where's The Fun In Forever"	2012	Background vocals	Miguel	Kaleidoscope Dream
"Living for Love"	2015	Keyboards, percussion	Madonna	Rebel Heart
"Pistol on My Side (P.O.M.S.)"	2018	Piano	Swizz Beatz	Poison
"Therapy Session"	2023	Producer	Lil Durk	Almost Healed

== Soundtrack appearances ==
List of soundtrack songs, with other performers, showing year released and soundtrack name
Title	Year	Other performer(s)	Soundtrack
"Dah Dee Dah (Sexy Thing)"	1997	none	Men in Black: The Album
"Rock Wit U"	2000	none	Shaft
"Rear View Mirror"	2001	none	Dr. Dolittle 2
"Fight"	2001	none	Ali
"Butterflyz" (KrucialKeys Remix)"	2002	none	Drumline
"Troubles"	2004	none	Nigdy w Życiu!
"People Get Ready"	2006	Lyfe Jennings	Glory Road
"I Will Make the Darkness Light"	2006	none	Glory Road
"Glory Road (Score)"	2006	Trevor Rabin	Glory Road
"Another Way to Die"	2008	Jack White	Quantum of Solace : Original Motion Picture Soundtrack
"Looking for Paradise"	2010	Alejandro Sanz	Tempos Modernos Internacional
"Rapture"	2010	none	Sex and the City 2
"Empire State of Mind (Part II) Broken Down"	2010	none	Sex and the City 2
"Put it in A Love Song"	2010	Beyonce	Ti Ti Ti – Internacional Vol. 1
"Girl on Fire"	2013	none	Salve Jorge Internacional
"Pressing On"	2013	none	Muscle Shoals
"Queen of the Field (Patsey's Song)"	2013	none	Music from and Inspired by 12 Years a Slave
"It's On Again"	2014	Kendrick Lamar	The Amazing Spider-Man 2: The Original Motion Picture Soundtrack
"Powerful"	2015	Empire Cast, Jussie Smollett	Empire: Original Soundtrack Season 2 Volume 1
"Back to Life"	2016	none	Queen of Katwe
"Apple"	2016	Pharrell Williams	Hidden Figures: The Album
"Lifeline"	2023	none	The Color Purple (Music from and Inspired By)

== See also ==
- Alicia Keys videography
- List of songs written by Alicia Keys
