= Santa Baby (disambiguation) =

"Santa Baby" is a song performed by American singer Eartha Kitt and Henri René and His Orchestra, released in 1953.

Santa Baby may also refer to:

- Santa Baby (album), the ninth studio album by Alicia Keys
- Santa Baby (film), a 2006 film directed by Ron Underwood and starring Jenny McCarthy
