= MTV Video Music Award for Best R&B =

Annual music video award

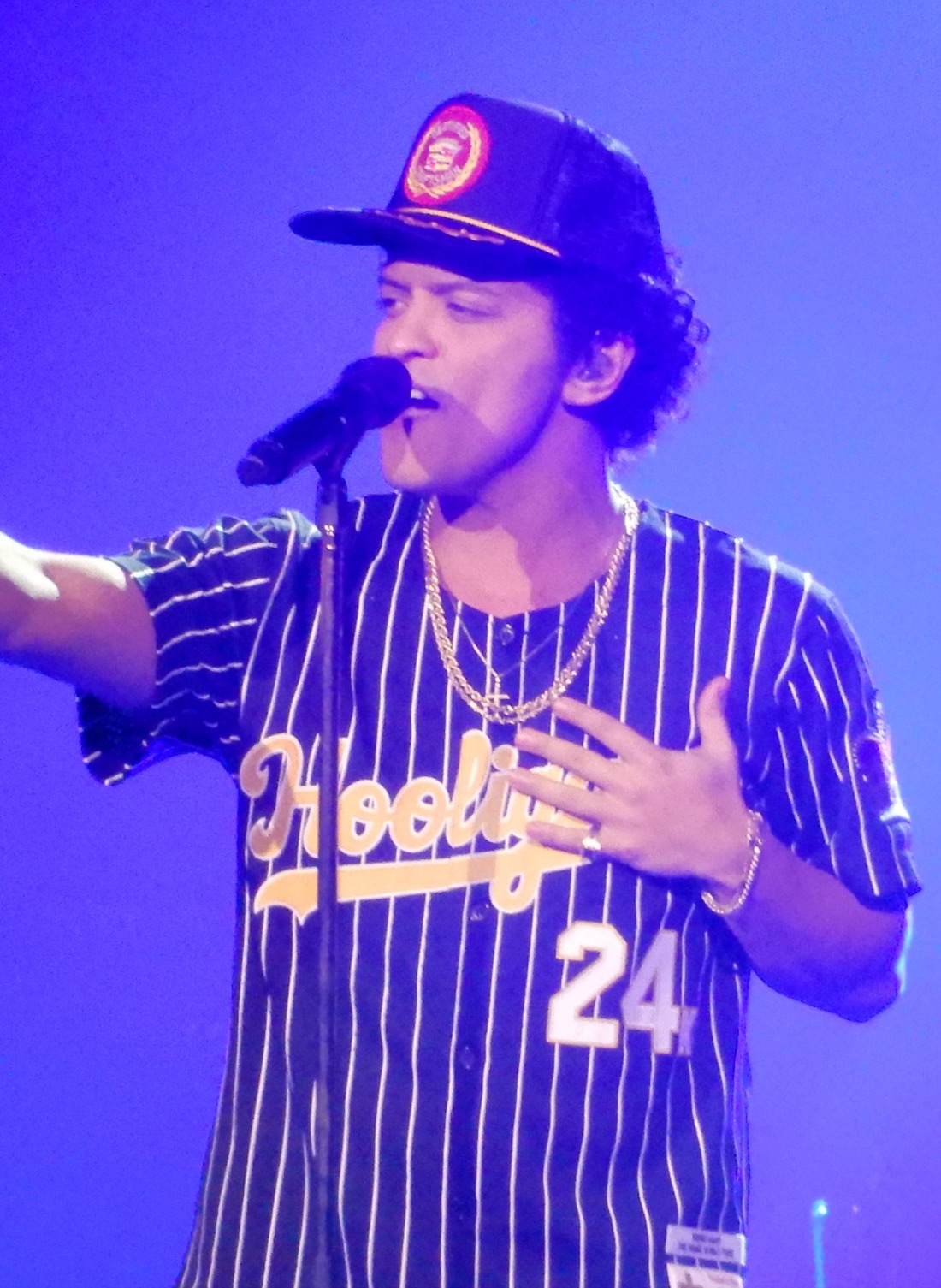
- Bruno Mars is the most recent recipient for "I Just Might"
- Awarded for: Music songs
- Country: United States
- Presented by: MTV
- First award: 1993
- Currently held by: Bruno Mars – "I Just Might" (2026)

Highlights
- Most awards: En Vogue, Destiny's Child, Beyoncé, Alicia Keys, the Weeknd, and SZA (2)
- Most nominations: Alicia Keys (8)
- Website: VMA website

The MTV Video Music Award for Best R&B is an award given out at the annual MTV Video Music Awards. The category was first presented in 1993 under the name Best R&B Video, and it was given every year until 2006. The following year MTV revamped the VMAs and eliminated all the genre categories. However, in 2008, when MTV returned the Video Music Awards to their previous format, Best R&B Video did not return despite four other genre awards doing so. It was only in 2019 that the R&B award returned to the VMAs as Best R&B.

En Vogue, Destiny's Child, Beyoncé, Alicia Keys, the Weeknd, and SZA are tied as this award's biggest winners, each having won it twice. Keys is also the category's biggest nominee, receiving her eighth nomination in 2023. In 2025, Mariah Carey won, winning her first ever competitive Video Music Award and winning the same night she received the Michael Jackson Video Vanguard Award.

== Recipients ==
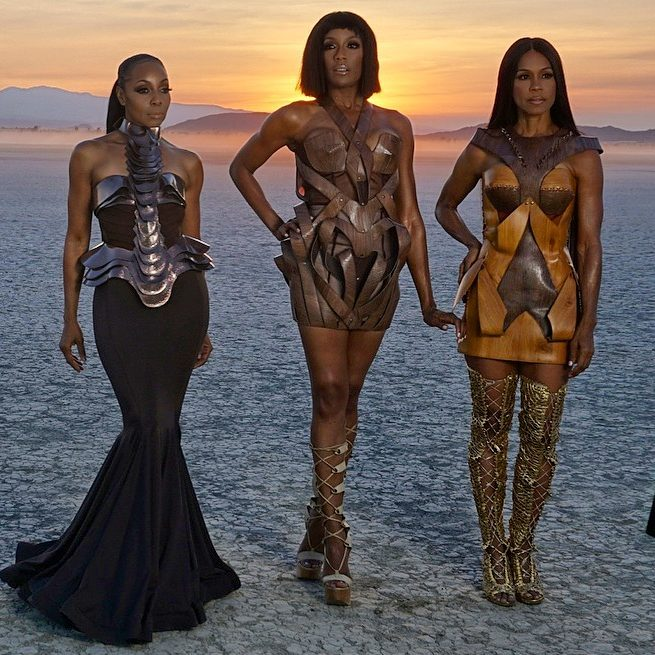
Inaugural and two-time winner En Vogue.

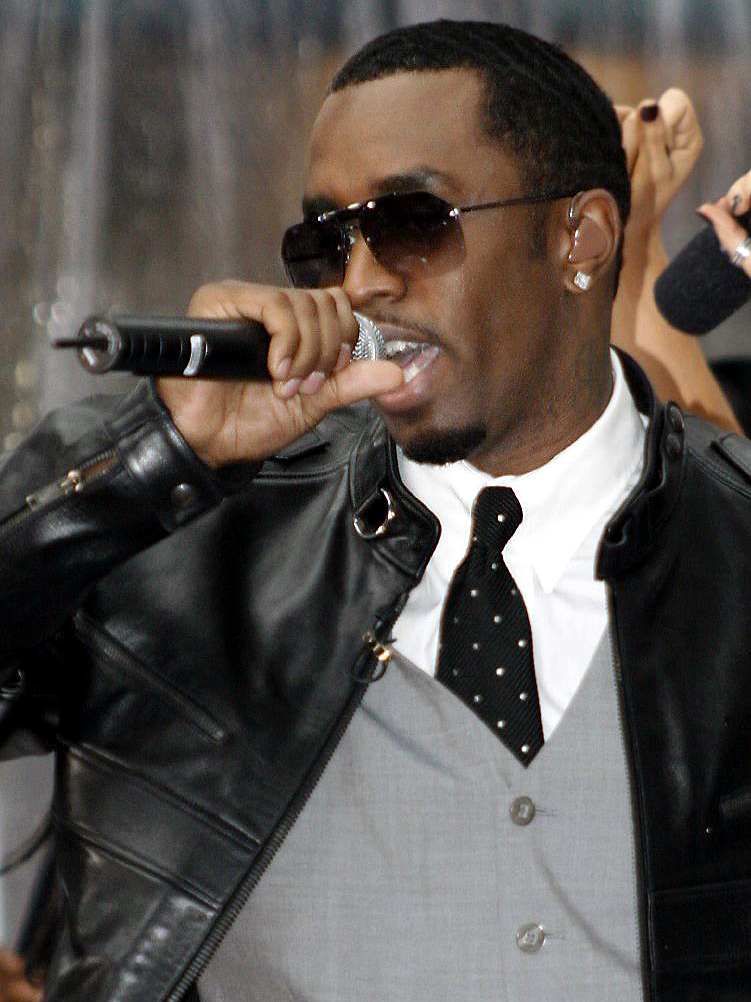
Puff Daddy was the first solo act winner of the category.

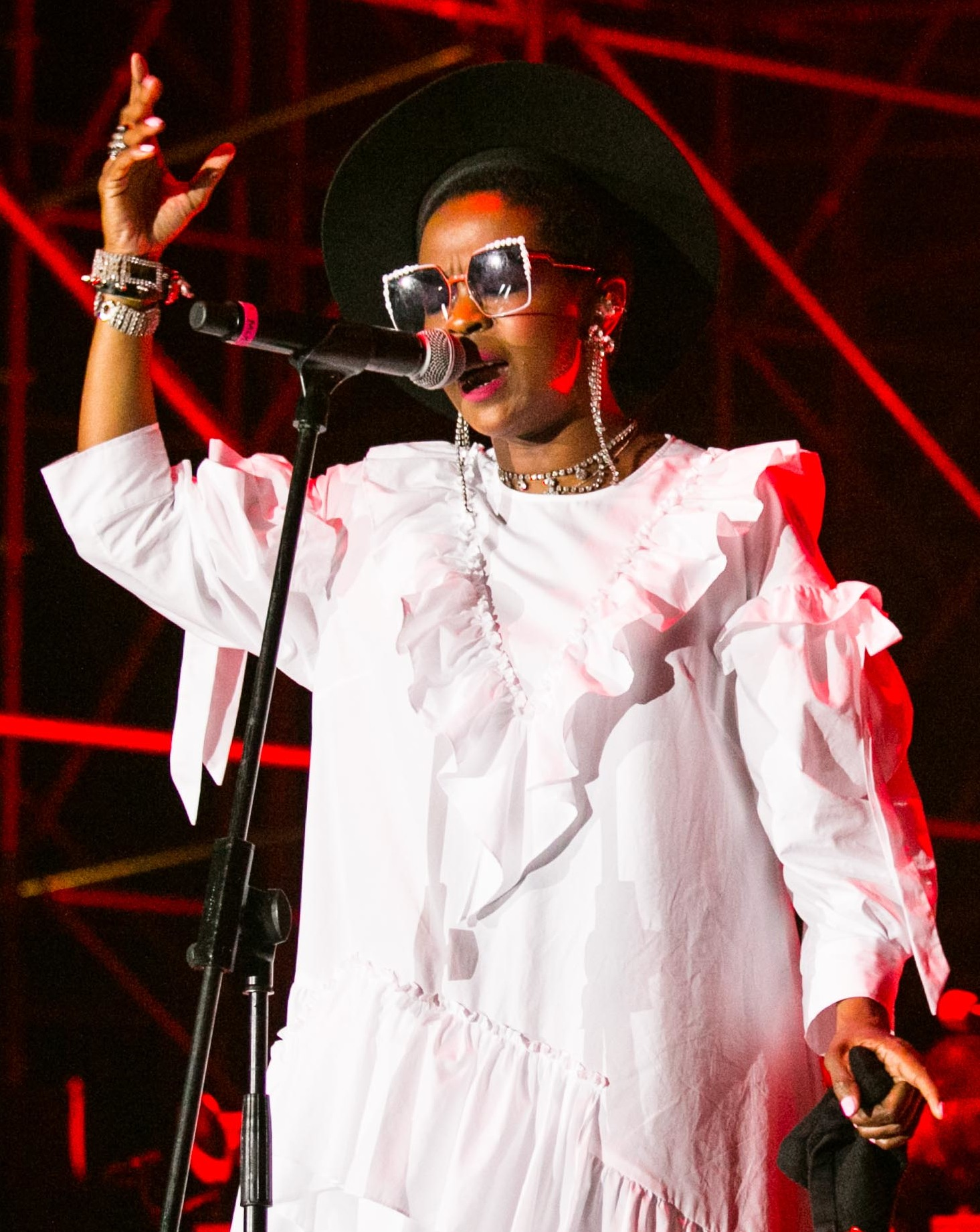
Lauryn Hill was the first female solo act to win the category.

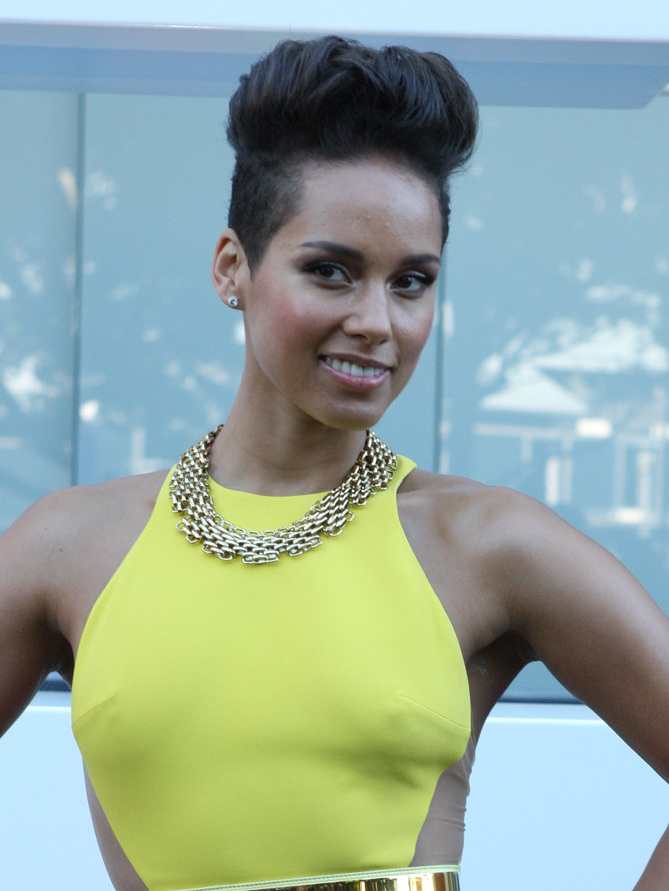
Alicia Keys is the most nominated act in the category with nine. She is also two-time consecutive winner with "If I Ain't Got You" and "Karma".

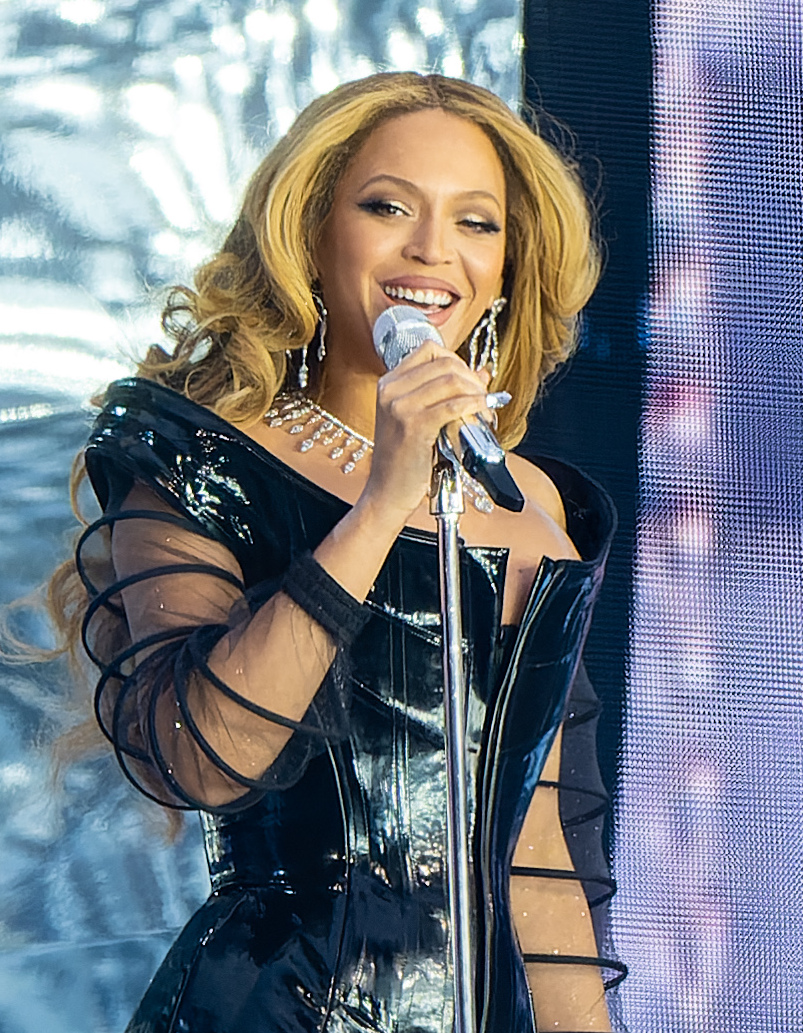
Beyoncé won the award two-times as a solo artist. She also won the award as a member of Destiny's Child for two consecutive times.

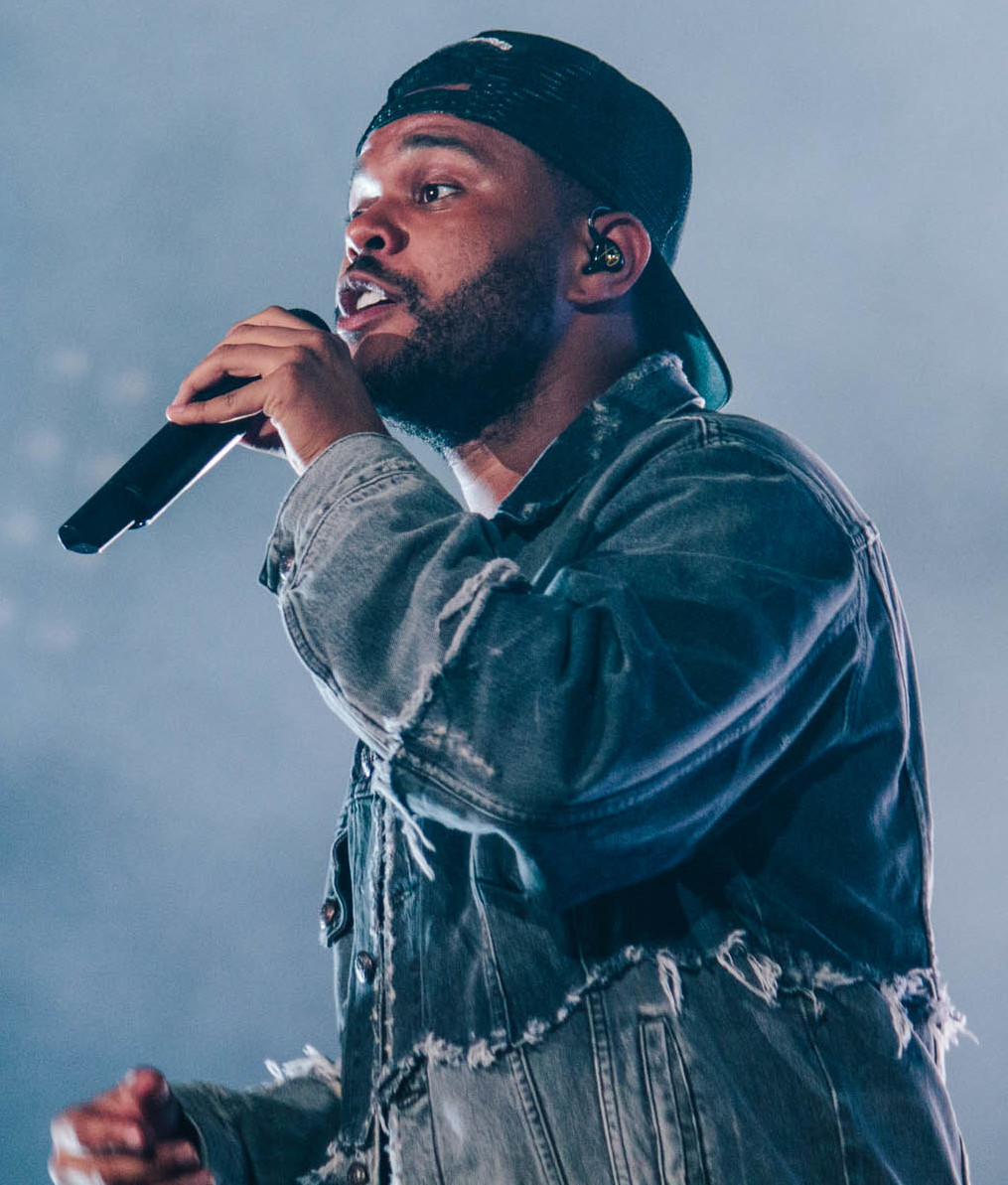
The Weeknd is the most awarded male singer with two.

=== 1990s ===
Recipients
Year (Note: Each year is linked to the article about the MTV Video Music Awards held that year.)	Winner(s)	Video	Nominees	Ref.
1993	En Vogue	"Free Your Mind"	Mary J. Blige – "Real Love"; Boyz II Men – "End of the Road"; Prince and the New Power Generation – "7"	
1994	Salt-N-Pepa with En Vogue	"Whatta Man"	Brand New Heavies – "Dream on Dreamer"; Toni Braxton – "Breathe Again"; R. Kelly – "Bump n' Grind"	
1995	TLC	"Waterfalls"	Boyz II Men – "Water Runs Dry"; Michael Jackson and Janet Jackson – "Scream"; Jade – "5-4-3-2 (Yo! Time Is Up)"; Montell Jordan – "This Is How We Do It"	
1996	The Fugees	"Killing Me Softly"	Toni Braxton – "You're Makin' Me High"; Mariah Carey and Boyz II Men – "One Sweet Day"; D'Angelo – "Brown Sugar"	
1997	Puff Daddy (featuring Faith Evans and 112)	"I'll Be Missing You"	Babyface with Stevie Wonder – "How Come, How Long"; Erykah Badu – "On & On"; Blackstreet (featuring Dr. Dre) – "No Diggity"; Toni Braxton – "Un-Break My Heart"	
1998	Wyclef Jean (featuring Refugee Allstars)	"Gone Till November"	Brandy and Monica – "The Boy is Mine"; K-Ci & JoJo – "All My Life"; Usher – "You Make Me Wanna"	
1999	Lauryn Hill	"Doo Wop (That Thing)"	Aaliyah – "Are You That Somebody?"; Brandy – "Have You Ever?"; Whitney Houston (featuring Faith Evans and Kelly Price) – "Heartbreak Hotel"	

=== 2000s ===
Recipients
Year	Winner(s)	Video	Nominees	Ref.
2000	Destiny's Child	"Say My Name"	Toni Braxton – "He Wasn't Man Enough"; D'Angelo – "Untitled (How Does It Feel)"; Brian McKnight – "Back at One"	
2001	Destiny's Child	"Survivor"	112 – "Peaches & Cream"; Sunshine Anderson – "Heard It All Before"; R. Kelly – "I Wish"; Jill Scott – "Gettin' In the Way"	
2002	Mary J. Blige	"No More Drama"	Aaliyah – "Rock the Boat"; Ashanti – "Foolish"; Alicia Keys – "A Woman's Worth"; Usher – "U Got It Bad"	
2003	Beyoncé (featuring Jay-Z)	"Crazy in Love"	Aaliyah – "Miss You"; Ashanti – "Rock wit U (Awww Baby)"; R. Kelly – "Ignition (Remix)"; Nelly (featuring Kelly Rowland) – "Dilemma"	
2004	Alicia Keys	"If I Ain't Got You"	Beyoncé – "Me, Myself and I"; Brandy (featuring Kanye West) – "Talk About Our Love"; R. Kelly – "Step in the Name of Love" (Remix); Usher – "Burn"	
2005	Alicia Keys	"Karma"	Mariah Carey – "We Belong Together"; Ciara (featuring Ludacris) – "Oh"; John Legend – "Ordinary People"; Usher and Alicia Keys – "My Boo"	
2006	Beyoncé (featuring Slim Thug and Bun B)	"Check on It"	Mary J. Blige – "Be Without You"; Chris Brown – "Yo (Excuse Me Miss)"; Mariah Carey – "Shake It Off"; Jamie Foxx (featuring Ludacris) – "Unpredictable"	
2007 – 2009	—N/a			

=== 2010s ===
Recipients
Year	Winner(s)	Video	Nominees	Ref.
2011 – 2018	—N/a			
2019	Normani (featuring 6LACK)	"Waves"	Childish Gambino – "Feels Like Summer"; H.E.R. (featuring Bryson Tiller) – "Could've Been"; Alicia Keys – "Raise a Man"; Ella Mai – "Trip"; Anderson .Paak (featuring Smokey Robinson) – "Make It Better"	

=== 2020s ===
Recipients
Year	Winner(s)	Video	Nominees	Ref.
2020	The Weeknd	"Blinding Lights"	Chloe x Halle – "Do It"; H.E.R. (featuring YG) – "Slide"; Alicia Keys – "Underdog"; Khalid (featuring Summer Walker) – "Eleven"; Lizzo – "Cuz I Love You"	
2021	Bruno Mars, Anderson .Paak and Silk Sonic	"Leave the Door Open"	Beyoncé, Blue Ivy, Saint Jhn and Wizkid – "Brown Skin Girl"; Chris Brown and Young Thug – "Go Crazy"; Giveon – "Heartbreak Anniversary"; H.E.R. (featuring Chris Brown) – "Come Through"; SZA – "Good Days"	
2022	The Weeknd	"Out of Time"	Chlöe – "Have Mercy"; H.E.R. – "For Anyone"; Alicia Keys – "City of Gods (Part II)"; Normani (featuring Cardi B) – "Wild Side"; Summer Walker, SZA and Cardi B – "No Love" (Extended Version)	
2023	SZA	"Shirt"	Chlöe (featuring Chris Brown) – "How Does It Feel"; Alicia Keys (featuring Lucky Daye) – "Stay"; Metro Boomin with The Weeknd, 21 Savage and Diddy – "Creepin' (Remix)"; Toosii – "Favorite Song"; Yung Bleu and Nicki Minaj – "Love in the Way"	
2024	SZA	"Snooze"	Alicia Keys – "Lifeline"; Victoria Monét – "On My Mama"; Muni Long – "Made for Me"; Tyla – "Water"; Usher, Summer Walker and 21 Savage – "Good Good"	
2025	Mariah Carey	"Type Dangerous"	Chris Brown – "Residuals"; Leon Thomas and Freddie Gibbs – "Mutt (Remix)"; PartyNextDoor – "No Chill"; Summer Walker – "Heart of a Woman"; SZA – "Drive"; The Weeknd and Playboi Carti – "Timeless"	
2026	Bruno Mars	"I Just Might"	Chris Brown – "It Depends / Obvious"; Dave and Tems – "Raindance"; Justin Bieber – "Yukon"; Kehlani – "Folded"; Mariah the Scientist and Kali Uchis – "Is It a Crime"	

== Statistics ==
=== Artists with multiple wins ===
2 wins

- Beyoncé
- Alicia Keys
- Bruno Mars
- En Vogue
- Destiny's Child
- SZA
- The Weeknd

=== Artists with multiple nominations ===
9 nominations

- Alicia Keys

6 nominations

- Chris Brown

5 nominations

- SZA
- Usher

4 nominations

- Beyoncé
- Toni Braxton
- Mariah Carey
- H.E.R.
- R. Kelly
- Summer Walker
- The Weeknd

3 nominations

- Mary J. Blige
- Brandy
- Aaliyah
- Boyz II Men

2 nominations

- D'Angelo
- Destiny's Child
- 21 Savage
- Chlöe
- Normani
- Cardi B
- Anderson .Paak
- En Vogue
- Ashanti
- Faith Evans
- 112
- Ludacris
- Bruno Mars
- Diddy

== See also ==
- MTV Europe Music Award for Best R&B
