= Noted: Alicia Keys The Untold Stories =

Documentary

- Genre: Documentary
- Directed by: TT The Artist
- Starring: Alicia Keys
- Country of origin: United States
- Original language: English
- No. of episodes: 5

Production
- Executive producer: Alicia Keys
- Production company: Westbrook Media

Original release
- Network: YouTube Premium
- Release: September 30 – October 4, 2021

Noted: Alicia Keys The Untold Stories is a 2021 documentary series about the life and career of American singer and songwriter Alicia Keys. The series offers insight into Keys’ world as an artist, a mother and wife through live performances, behind the scenes footage and conversations. The series was released in four episodes on YouTube as part of YouTube Originals September 30, 2021. In the series. Keys previews four songs, “Skydive”, “Is It Insane”, “Best of Me” and “Lala” from her eighth studio album Keys (2021). Fifth bonus episode was released on YouTube Premium and features behind the scenes footage of Keys and the director TT The Artist producing four music videos.

== Overview ==
In episode 1, Keys is announced as the number one certified female R&B artist of the millennium, and interviews her mother about her childhood in New York City. In episode 2, Keys discusses her difficult career beginnings and relationship with Kerry Brothers Jr., and talks to her father about their relationship. In episode 3, Keys and Swizz Beatz discuss their family life and what makes their marriage work. In episode 4, Keys travels to The Bahamas to work on music and discusses equality in the music industry and collaborating with other artists.

== Cast ==
- Alicia Keys
- Swizz Beatz, husband
- Egypt and Genesis, sons
- Terria Joseph, mother
- Craig Cook, father
- Ann Mincieli, engineer and friend

Additionally, the behind-the-scenes footage used in the documentary feature Kerry Brothers Jr., Swae Lee, Raphael Saadiq and J. Cole, Jody Gerson among others.

== Background ==
The series was announced in May 2020, with Variety reporting that the working title of the project was Noted and that it would “follow the singer-songwriter as she celebrate[s] the 20th anniversary of her seminal album Songs in A Minor and heads into the studio to record her eighth record”, and was originally slated to premiere in the summer 2021.

In September 2021, Keys released the trailer for the series. In the trailer, Keys says that "When I'm making music, I'm exposing all of my secrets, and I'm very uncomfortable being exposed — but I guess not so much anymore". According to People, "viewers get a behind-the-scenes look at Keys' struggles in the midst of stardom". According to Entertainment Weekly, the docuseries "will show Keys as she takes viewers inside her world as an artist, a mother and wife". The director of the series, TT The Artist, commented that she “wanted to create an audiovisual experience that would definitely let the viewers connect with Alicia on a more personal level, like we’re in the studio with her, seeing her process, things that we don’t always get access to".

== Episodes ==
No.	Title	Directed by	Original release date
1	"Chapter One: It Was Always About Me And You"	TT The Artist	September 30, 2021
2	"Chapter Two: Nobody Makes You"	TT The Artist	September 30, 2021
3	"Chapter Three: You Get The Best Of Me"	TT The Artist	September 30, 2021
4	"Chapter Four: Timeless"	TT The Artist	September 30, 2021
5	"Behind The Keys | Alicia Keys: NOTED (Bonus Clip)"	TT The Artist	October 4, 2021

== Promotion ==
Keys appeared on the Elvis Duran and the Morning Show to talk about the series on October 6, 2021. Keys discussed the series with Kay Adams on People (the TV show!) on October 7, 2021. Keys appeared on On Air with Ryan Seacrest on October 8, 2021. Keys held a YouTube live stream with Jay Shetty on October 7, 2021. In addition, Keys gave interviews to Essence, USA Today and Las Vegas Review-Journal.
