= Taj Stansberry =

American director and photographer

Taj Stansberry (born in Oakland, California, United States) is an American director and photographer, known for his music videos with artists such as Rihanna, J Lo, Usher, Ne-Yo, John Legend, Young Jeezy, Ludacris, Keyshia Cole, Swizz Beatz, Eve, Wale and Big Sean. His video for J Lo's "On the Floor" is the most watched female video of all time on YouTube with over 800,000,000 views. He is currently developing a few feature projects as well.

He has directed music videos and commercial products for a wide range of artists.

Taj is a self-taught photographer turned director. He started out photographing local rappers and models in Oakland, where he grew up. He then went on to work as a production assistant for renowned music video director, Anthony Mandler, who motivated Taj to start directing himself. Soon after he signed to his first production company, Boxfresh Pictures. Today he is represented by Triple Seven Productions for Commercials & Music Videos, and Verve Talent & Literary Agency for feature films.
