= The Vault Playlist, Vol. 1 =

Vault Playlist Vol. 1

EP by Alicia Keys
- Released: April 7, 2017
- Length: 16:10
- Label: RCA
- Producer: Alicia Keys; Kerry Brothers Jr.

Alicia Keys chronology
Here (2016)	Vault Playlist Vol. 1 (2017)

Vault Playlist Vol. 1 is an extended play by American recording artist Alicia Keys released on 7 April 2017 on RCA Records. The extended play contains an acoustic version of "No One" (2007) from her third studio album As I Am (2007), a previously unreleased song "A Place to Call My Own", piano version of "If I Ain't Got You" (2004) from her second studio album The Diary of Alicia Keys (2003) and "Stolen Moments", which was previously released as a live version on Unplugged (2005) and as a bonus track on Japanese edition of her fourth studio album The Element of Freedom (2009).

"Place to Call My Own" was premiered at the 2011 IHeartRadio Music Festival, with Keys saying "I've been in the studio working on some new music, and I thought tonight would be the perfect night to play something new for you". James Dinh from MTV News described the song as "an uplifting, piano-driven tune about building up the courage to overcome struggles and find happiness" while Rolling Stone called it "stark, soulful ballad" and "urgent, piano-pounding number".

== Track listing ==
Standard edition
No.	Title	Writer(s)	Length
1.	"No One" (Acoustic)	Alicia Keys; Kerry Brothers Jr.; George M. Harry	4:19
2.	"Place to Call My Own" (AK Version)	Keys	3:08
3.	"If I Ain't Got You" (Piano & Vocal Version)	Keys	3:51
4.	"Stolen Moments"	Keys; Kerry Brothers Jr; Lamont Green; Wah Wah Watson	4:52
5.	"Pray for Forgiveness"	Keys; Linda Perry	4:44
Total length:			20:00
