= Sex and the City 2 (soundtrack) =

2010 soundtrack album by various artists

Sex and the City 2: Original Motion Picture Soundtrack

Soundtrack album by various artists
- Released: May 25, 2010
- Length: 64:25
- Label: WaterTower
- Producers: Dido Armstrong; Rollo Armstrong; Erykah Badu; Alicia Keys; KNS Productions; Cyndi Lauper; Michael McGregor; Lennie Petze; James Poyser; John Reynolds; Salaamremi.com; Al Shux; Sister Bliss; Billy Stritch; T-Pain; Ali Dee Theodore; Aaron Zigman

Sex and the City 2: Original Motion Picture Soundtrack is the soundtrack to the 2010 film Sex and the City 2, a sequel to Sex and the City (2008) based on the 1998–2004 television series. The album, which released on May 25, 2010, by WaterTower Music, features selection of pop hits from Alicia Keys, Jennifer Hudson amongst others. Some of the tracks were covered by the film's cast members.

== Background ==
The soundtrack was officially announced on April 22, 2010, which includes selections from Alicia Keys, Cee Lo, Jennifer Hudson, Leona Lewis, amongst several others. The lead actresses Sarah Jessica Parker, Kim Cattrall, Kristin Davis and Cynthia Nixon covered Helen Reddy's 1972 single "I Am Woman". Also, Liza Minnelli covered two songs: "Single Ladies (Put a Ring on It)" and "Ev'ry Time We Say Goodbye", a duet with Billy Stritch. Keys further performed a cover of 1981 single by Blondie, "Rapture". The official cover art of the album was also unveiled.

== Track listing ==
No.	Title	Writer(s)	Producer(s)	Length
1.	"Rapture (Note: contain elements of "Sex and the City" by Douglas Cuomo)" (performed by Alicia Keys)	Chris Stein; Deborah Harry	Salaamremi.com	4:47
2.	"Everything to Lose" (performed by Dido)	Dido Armstrong; Rollo Armstrong; Ayalah Bentovim	Dido; R. Armstrong; Sister Bliss	4:28
3.	"Language of Love" (performed by Cee Lo)	Cee Lo Green; Faheem Najm	T-Pain	3:59
4.	"Window Seat" (performed by Erykah Badu)	Badu; James Poyser	Badu; Poyser	4:50
5.	"Kidda" (performed by Natacha Atlas)	Atlas; John Reynolds; Justin Adams	Reynolds	4:56
6.	"Euphrates Dream" (performed by Michael McGregor)	McGregor	McGregor	3:37
7.	"Single Ladies (Put a Ring on It)" (performed by Liza Minnelli)	Christopher Stewart; Terius Nash; Thaddis Harrell; Beyoncé Knowles	Salaamremi.com; Billy Stritch	3:13
8.	"Can't Touch It" (performed by Ricki-Lee)	Ricki-Lee Coulter; Brian Kierulf; Josh Schwartz	KNS Productions	2:51
9.	"Empire State of Mind (Part II) Broken Down (Note: contains a sample of "Love on a Two-Way Street" by The Moments)" (performed by Alicia Keys)	Keys; Alexander Shuckburgh; Shawn Carter; Jane't "J'nay" Sewell-Ulepić; Angela Hunte; Bert Keyes; Sylvia Robinson	Al Shux; Keys	3:33
10.	"Love Is Your Color" (performed by Jennifer Hudson and Leona Lewis)	Salaam Remi; Claude Kelly	Salaamremi.com	3:41
11.	"I Am Woman" (performed by Sarah Jessica Parker, Kim Cattrall, Kristin Davis and Cynthia Nixon)	Helen Reddy; Ray Burton	Salaamremi.com; Ali Dee Theodore^{[a]}	2:07
12.	"If Ever I Would Leave You" (performed by Sex and the City Men's Choir)	Frederick Loewe; Alan Jay Lerner	Aaron Zigman	2:19
13.	"Sunrise Sunset" (performed by Sex and the City Men's Choir)	Jerry Bock; Sheldon Harnick	Zigman	3:42
14.	"Till There Was You" (performed by Sex and the City Men's Choir)	Meredith Willson	Zigman	2:01
15.	"Bewitched, Bothered and Bewildered" (performed by Shayna Steele, Jordan Ballard and Kamilah Marshall)	Richard Rodgers; Lorenz Hart	Salaamremi.com	3:26
16.	"Ev'ry Time We Say Goodbye" (performed by Liza Minnelli with Billy Stritch)	Cole Porter	Stritch	4:23
17.	"True Colors" (performed by Cyndi Lauper)	Tom Kelly; Billy Steinberg	Lauper; Lennie Petze	3:45
18.	"Divas and Dunes" (performed by Aaron Zigman)	Zigman	Zigman	2:46

Notes

- ^{^[a]} signifies an additional producer

== Additional music ==
- "Songs Remind Me of You" by Annie appears in the background of the afterparty scene, but is not included on the soundtrack.
- "Empire State of Mind" by Jay-Z featuring Alicia Keys appears in the background of the Smith's film premiere scene, and official trailer, but is not included on the soundtrack.

== Charts ==
Chart (2010)	Peak position
Australian Albums (ARIA)	7
Austrian Albums (Ö3 Austria)	13
Belgian Albums (Ultratop Flanders)	73
Canadian Albums (Billboard)	12
Danish Albums (Hitlisten)	17
French Albums (SNEP)	160
German Albums (Offizielle Top 100)	12
Greek International Albums (IFPI)	1
Hungarian Albums (MAHASZ)	18
Irish Compilation Albums (IRMA)	2
Italian Compilation Albums (FIMI)	15
Japanese Albums (Oricon)	20
Mexican Albums (Top 100 Mexico)	41
New Zealand Albums (RMNZ)	22
Spanish Albums (Promusicae)	69
Swiss Albums (Schweizer Hitparade)	18
UK Compilation Albums (Official Charts)	7
US Billboard 200	13
US Soundtrack Albums (Billboard)	2

== Original score ==
Sex and the City 2: Original Motion Picture Score

Film score by Aaron Zigman
- Released: May 25, 2010
- Genre: Film score
- Length: 64:25
- Label: WaterTower
- Producer: Aaron Zigman

Aaron Zigman chronology
Why Did I Get Married Too? (2010)	Sex and the City 2 (2010)	For Colored Girls (2010)

The film's score was composed and produced by Aaron Zigman, who also composed the predecessor. It was recorded and mixed by Dennis S. Sands and Steve Kempster and performed by a large ensemble of the Hollywood Studio Symphony conducted and orchestrated by Stephen Coleman and additional orchestrations handled by Patrick Krist. The score was released by WaterTower Music on the same day as the soundtrack.

No.	Title	Length
1.	"Divas and Dunes"	2:51
2.	"Welcome To Abu Dhabi"	5:10
3.	"I'm Downstairs"	1:41
4.	"Meeting Erin"	1:39
5.	"Arrive At Souk"	1:44
6.	"Carrie Wonders / Airport Arrival"	1:13
7.	"Samantha Talks To Smith / Carrie's Arrival"	1:05
8.	"Call The Girls / It Happened One Night"	1:21
9.	"Meeting Erin / Miranda / Arrival At Connecticut"	1:17
10.	"Airport"	1:58
11.	"Confiscate Drugs"	1:13
12.	"Carrie Sees Aidan"	0:57
13.	"Breakfast / Jeep Guy"	1:36
14.	"Breakfast pt.2"	0:54
15.	"Dress For Date"	2:04
16.	"I Have Condoms"	2:23
17.	"Hookah Lounge"	3:08
18.	"Phone Call"	2:15
19.	"Samantha Released"	1:01
20.	"Packing"	2:05
21.	"Watch"	0:51
22.	"Fashion"	1:23
23.	"Sneaking Burkas"	0:52
24.	"Home Without Big"	1:24
25.	"Big Is Back"	3:27
Total length:		45:32
