= How I'm Livin' =

How I'm Livin' is a reality television show on BET. Each week, the show profiled a couple of big names in the entertainment industry and followed them on their activities for a day. They have included those on Steve Harvey, LisaRaye, Khia, Tweet, Rickey Smiley, A.J. and Free from 106 & Park, and Guy Torry.

The show was supposed to be a competitor to MTV's highly rated Cribs.
