= December Back 2 June =

Single by Alicia Keys

from the album Santa Baby
- Released: October 28, 2022
- Studio: Criteria Studios (MIami, FL)
- Length: 2:43
- Label: Alicia Keys
- Songwriters: Alicia Keys; Thomas Lumpkins; Taylor Monét; Em Walcott; Joshua Conerly
- Producer: Alicia Keys

Alicia Keys singles chronology
"Trillions" (2022)	"December Back 2 June" (2022)	"Come for Me" (2023)

Music video
- "December Back 2 June" on YouTube

"December Back 2 June" is a song by American singer and songwriter Alicia Keys. It was released as the lead single from Keys' Christmas album, Santa Baby (2022), through Alicia Keys Records on October 28, 2022.

== Background and release ==
On October 20, it was announced that Keys would release her first Christmas album, Santa Baby, the following month and that its lead single "December Back 2 June" would be released on October 28. In an interview with NPR, Keys commented that the song:

It really is talking about how at this time for Christmas, I don't even need any wishes because I have the love that I'm looking for. And so I think that definitely is the sentiment of the song, that love and this good energy that I think we all call towards us and want for the holidays is something we can have all year round. And so that's why it's called "December Back 2 June."

Keys explained that the song "sounds just like a Jackson 5 sample" and producer Tommy Parker created the "Michael Jackson sound" by pitching up his own voice. Initially, Keys thought that the "sample-sounding pitch" voice was from a Jackson 5 song that she hadn't never heard before, and fell in love with the sound, saying "to me it felt like a ‘You Don’t Know My Name’ or one of these songs that are my style, like that kind of ’70s sample, we’ll put a modern approach on it. And so it totally was 100% me, and he said that he created it with that in mind.”

"December Back 2 June" was simultaneously released to digital download on iTunes and Amazon and streaming on Spotify, as well as YouTube. Music video for the song was released on November 4, 2022. A live rendition of the song was released on Apple Music Live: Alicia Keys on December 22, 2022.

== Composition and lyrics ==
"December Back 2 June" is an uptempo song that lasts for a duration of 2 minutes 44 seconds. The song was written by Keys, Tayla Parx and produced by Tommy Parker and YNG Josh. According to The Franklin News Post, the song is about "a love that spans the seasons". On the chorus, Keys sings; “For this Christmas / Don’t need wishes / Not since I met you / Every season you give reason to love you / From December back to June”. The song contains a repetitive “it’s just Christmastime” line. According to Daniel Welsh from the Huffpost, on the song's lyrics Keys is "referencing how the festive season makes her feel nostalgic for the past year with a loved one". Rated R&B's Keithan Samuel stated that on the sing "Keys lets her man know that being with him feels like Christmas every day of the year" and "She isn’t pressed for special gifts during the holidays because their bond is more than what she could ask for". Rachel Brodsky from Stereogum described the "layered" song as having "jingles, scooby-doo-bops, and a feel-good rhythm".

== Critical reception ==
Keithan Samuels from Rated R&B called it a "heartwarming tune" while Retro Pop Magazine called it a "loved-up festive number". Melissa Ruggieri from USA Today included the song on her list of the best Christmas songs of 2022 and wrote: "Shades of The Jackson 5 and Boyz II Men color this finger-snapping slice of soul". Madeline Roth from The Daily Beast included the song on her list of The 25 Best New Christmas Songs of 2022 and commented that Keys "dips into ’70s Motown territory" on the song and that "It’s an instant feel-good classic". Daniel Welsh from the HuffPost called it "bit of a bop" and named it a "stand-out" song on the album and wrote that the song "mixes a retro R&B vibe with a modern sound". Mya Abrahams from Vibe commented that the song is a "made-for-lovers jam about having an abundance of love and cheer that lasts year-round" but the song "feels like there’s an uncredited Jackson 5 sample present". According to Rachel Brodsky from Stereogum, "Keys goes into ’70s Soul Train mode" on the song, which "shows way more effort than you’d think Keys would care to put in at this comfortable stage in her career. Chris Klimek from Washington City Paper called it "seductive" with "its buoyant and danceable “dum dum DUM DUM” and “woo OOH OOH ohh ooh” vocal backing tracks".

== Live performances ==
Keys performed the song during Curebound Concert for Cures benefit concert at the Rady Shell at Jacobs Park on November 4, 2022. Keys performed the song on Today on December 6, 2022. Keys uploaded a live rendition of the song on her YouTube channel on December 8, 2022.

== Credits and personnel ==
Adapted from Santa Baby liner notes.

Recording

- Recorded at Criteria Studios, Miami

Personnel

- Written by Alicia Keys, Thomas Lumpkins, Taylor Monet, Emile Walcott and Joshua Conerly
- Produced by Tommy Parker
- Co-produced by Joshua ”YNG Josh” Conerly
- Vocals arranged by Tommy Parker and Tayla Parx
- Background vocals: Alicia Keys, Tommy Parker
- Engineered and recorded by Ann Mincieli
- Engineered by Brendan Morawski
- Assistant engineer: Dominic Starke
- Mixed by Ken Lewis and George Massenburg
