= City of Gods =

2022 single by Fivio Foreign, Kanye West and Alicia Keys, Playboi Carti

Single by Fivio Foreign, Kanye West, and Alicia Keys

from the album B.I.B.L.E. and Donda 2
- Released: February 11, 2022
- Genre: Drill
- Length: 4:16
- Label: Rich Fish; Columbia
- Songwriters: Maxie Lee Ryles III; Kanye West; Allan Lopez; Andrew Taggart; Aswad Asif; Brittany Amaradio; Cristian Dejesus Tejada; Dwayne Abernathy Jr.; Hamzal Dweep Hamaal; Malik Piper; Mark Williams; Mike Dean; Raul Cubina; Alicia Keys
- Producers: AyoAA; Hemz; Kanye West; Lil Mav; Ojivolta; the Chainsmokers; Tweek Tune; Tommy Rush

Fivio Foreign singles chronology
"Off the Grid" (2021)	"City of Gods" (2022)	"Magic City" (2022)

Kanye West singles chronology
"Eazy" (2022)	"City of Gods" (2022)	"Keep It Burnin" (2022)

Alicia Keys singles chronology
"Best of Me" (2021)	"City of Gods" (2022)	"City of Gods (Part II)" (2022)

"City of Gods" (Note: Written as "City of God" in all caps on the streaming release of Donda 2.) is a song by American rappers Fivio Foreign and Kanye West and American singer Alicia Keys. It was released as the lead single from Fivio's debut studio album B.I.B.L.E. and the second single from West's eleventh studio album, Donda 2. On the song, Playboi Carti provides ad-libs, while Keys interpolates the chorus from "New York City" (2015) by The Chainsmokers. The track was certified Gold by the Recording Industry Association of America, indicating 500,000 units recorded in the US and was nominated at the 54th NAACP Image Awards for Outstanding Hip Hop/Rap Song.

== Background ==
Kanye West and Fivio Foreign first worked together for the song "Off the Grid" (with Playboi Carti, who provides ad-libs on this song), released on West's album Donda in 2021. The collaboration came together after West called Fivio Foreign to record in Mercedes Benz Stadium the night before the listening event for Donda. According to Fivio Foreign, West praised the verse the rapper recorded for "Off the Grid", lauding his similarity to his frequent collaborator, Jay-Z. West was also adamant about getting Jay-Z himself to perform on "City of Gods", but this never materialized.

Before Donda released, Fivio Foreign told his fans on Twitter that West was executive producing and performing on his upcoming album B.I.B.L.E. On February 5, 2022, Fivio Foreign tweeted "I ain't gon lie, Ye gave me the feature of the Yr.. He was talking 2 crazy on that verse [sic]".

When Fivio Foreign first got the beat for "City of Gods", it featured a sample of the 2015 track "New York City" by The Chainsmokers. When playing it for West, he said "Yo, I see something with this song" and asked Fivio to send the beat so he could change it around. One of the changes West made was taking out the sample and getting Alicia Keys to sing the vocals instead. Originally Fivio was rapping "Ain't no king of New York, nobody really in charge", and when he played it for West, he said "You gotta say you're the king of New York". Fivio Foreign then suggested that he should rap "Pop was the king of New York, now I'm the one that's in charge" (thereby paying tribute to late drill rapper Pop Smoke), which West responded to by saying "Yo that's even better!".

The song is dedicated to late rapper, friend of Fivio Foreign and longtime collaborator TDott Woo, who was shot and killed a week before the release of the song. In a statement put up with the release of the song, Fivio said "T Dot. That's my baby boy. I never thought I'd be doing this without you here with me. You supposed to be here with me but you gon' always be the prince in the City of Gods. Your name will forever live through with me. Long Live Prince T Dot."

== Critical reception ==
The song has been compared to the collaboration "Empire State of Mind" (2009) by Jay-Z and Alicia Keys, in addition to the release of the second version that references in its title "Empire State of Mind (Part II) Broken Down", featured on Keys' album The Element of Freedom.

Complex's writers have associated the song with both "Empire State of Mind" and "Run This Town", appreciating the combination of Foreign's drill music with Kanye's production, even though "the glitzy synth made it feel like American Eagle drill; [...] Just too glossy" and that "overall, it’s a bit of an oblong song". At the end Alicia Keys was prized for her "singing reverently about New York City; [...] with impressive vocals on the chorus". Christine Ochefu by GQ was pleasantly impressed to find Keys on a drill track.

== Personnel ==
Credits adapted from Tidal.

Music

- Vocals – Fivio Foreign, Kanye West, Alicia Keys
- Additional vocals – Playboi Carti
- Production – AyoAA, Hemz, Kanye West, Lil Mav, Ojivolta, The Chainsmokers, Tweek Tune
- Co-production – Dem Jointz
- Misc. production – BoogzDaBeast, Bordeaux, Mike Dean, Non Native, Scoop

Technical

- Mix engineering – Mike Dean
- Master engineering – Mike Dean
- Recording engineer – John Cunningham, Non Native, Shaan Singh, Fritz Owens, Luca Zadra
- Assistant engineer – Sean Solymar, Tommy Rush

== City of Gods (Part II) ==
"City of Gods (Part II)"

Single by Alicia Keys
- Released: April 7, 2022
- Length: 3:12
- Label: AKW
- Songwriters: Alicia Keys; Allan Lopez; Andrew Taggart; Aswad Asif; Brittany Amaradio; Cristian Dejesus Tejada; Dwayne Abernathy Jr.; Hamza Hamaal; Jahmal Gwin; Kanye West; Malik Piper; Mark Williams; Maxie Ryles III; Mike Dean; Raul Cubina; Scoop Brenner II
- Producer: Alicia Keys

Alicia Keys singles chronology
"City of Gods" (2022)	"City of Gods (Part II)" (2022)	"Trillions" (2022)

Music video
- "City of Gods (Part II)" on YouTube

On April 7, 2022, Alicia Keys released a solo version of the song with stripped back production called "City of Gods (Part II)". The video of the song was nominated at the 2022 MTV Video Music Awards in the Best R&B category.

== Charts ==
=== Weekly charts ===
Weekly chart performance for "City of Gods"
Chart (2022)	Peak position
Australia (ARIA)	66
Canada Hot 100 (Billboard)	20
Global 200 (Billboard)	43
Iceland (Tónlistinn)	16
Ireland (IRMA)	36
New Zealand Hot Singles (RMNZ)	4
Portugal (AFP)	174
South Africa Streaming (TOSAC)	48
Sweden Heatseeker (Sverigetopplistan)	5
Switzerland (Schweizer Hitparade)	91
UK Singles (Official Charts)	58
UK Hip Hop/R&B (Official Charts)	31
US Billboard Hot 100	46
US Hot R&B/Hip-Hop Songs (Billboard)	15
US Rhythmic Airplay (Billboard)	7
US R&B/Hip-Hop Airplay (Billboard)	22

=== Year-end charts ===
2022 year-end chart performance for "City of Gods"
Chart (2022)	Position
US Hot R&B/Hip-Hop Songs (Billboard)	63
US Rhythmic (Billboard)	41

== Certifications ==
Certifications for "City of Gods"
Region	Certification	Certified units/sales
Canada (Music Canada)	Gold	40,000^{‡}
United States (RIAA)	Gold	500,000^{‡}
^{‡} Sales+streaming figures based on certification alone.

== Release history ==
Release history and formats for "City of Gods"
Region	Date	Format	Label	Ref.
Various	February 11, 2022	Digital download; streaming	Rich Fish; Columbia	
United States	February 15, 2022	Urban contemporary radio	Columbia	
Various	April 29, 2025	Digital download; streaming	YZY	
