= Santa Baby (album) =

Studio album by Alicia Keys
- Released: November 4, 2022
- Studio: Jungle City (New York City); Teldex (Berlin, Germany); Criteria (Miami, Florida); Arts and Music Recording (Milan, Italy); die:mischbatterie (Bavaria, Germany); Record Plant (Los Angeles); Conway (Los Angeles); Perfect Sound (Los Angeles); Oven (New York City)
- Genre: Christmas
- Length: 36:09
- Label: Alicia Keys
- Producer: Alicia Keys; Tommy Parker; YNG Josh

Alicia Keys chronology
Keys (2021)	Santa Baby (2022)	Hell's Kitchen (Original Broadway Cast Recording) (2024)

Singles from Santa Baby
- 1. "December Back 2 June" Released: October 28, 2022

Santa Baby is the ninth studio album and first Christmas album by American singer and songwriter Alicia Keys. It was released through Alicia Keys Records on November 4, 2022, exclusively on Apple Music. Her first Christmas album, Santa Baby consists of eleven tracks, featuring four original songs and seven cover versions of Christmas standards. The album's lead single, "December Back 2 June", was released on October 28, 2022.

== Composition ==
Santa Baby is Keys's first Christmas album, and the first project released through her independent label since her contract with RCA Records ended. The album consists of eleven tracks, reworked by the singer herself, including four original compositions: "December Back 2 June", "You Don't Have to Be Alone", "Old Memories on Christmas", and "Not Even the King", which was originally included on Keys's 2012 album, Girl on Fire. Musically the album features Christmas songs with soul, R&B, jazz and gospel influences. Keys explained the meaning of the album and the production with the Alicia Keys Records team:

The album that I just released for the holidays, being the first release on my own imprint, it feels really exciting. I also feel very determined and focused on how I want to continue to be not only my own woman, who is creating the proper business and really being my own boss and creating the opportunities that I want, but also thinking about how does that happen with other artists, with other women. [...] I'm really, really ecstatic about Alicia Keys Records. It's a big statement being an artist who has been able to have the gift and the tenacity of longevity

== Promotion ==
On October 28, 2022, Keys published the first single from the album, "December Back 2 June". To promote the album, Keys appeared on The Late Show with Stephen Colbert on December 8, 2022. On December 21, 2022, Keys performed at the Apple Music Live: Alicia Keys Holiday Masquerade Ball in Broadway's United Palace Theater, alongside Jon Batiste and Jvke.

== Critical reception ==
Santa Baby ratings
Review scores
Source	Rating
AllMusic	3/5 stars

The album received generally positive reviews from music critics, who appreciated the production and arrangement of the songs matched with the singer's vocal abilities. In her review for Vibe, Mya Abraham wrote that Santa Baby "blends the comfort of tradition with elevated, modern production, allowing listeners to bask in whatever they define the holidays to be." Ed Mazza by HuffPost felt that Keys "shows off her songwriting skills" with her original compositions. Jon Pareles, reviewing the album for The New York Times, describes Keys' vocals as "high, breathy and playful, and she allows herself to show scratches and imperfections", juxtaposed with a production composed of "elaborate arrangements" drawing from soul, gospel and jazz. Pareles notes that these are eleven "largely secular songs", in which the four songs written by the artist "are about longing and affection; [...] Throughout the album, she invites loved ones closer". Columbia Daily Tribune awarded the album five out of five stars, describing Santa Baby as "sleek, substantive and sexy", in which there is a "shimmering piano and forward-moving grooves [to] frame Keys' voice". Madison Vain and Bria McNeal, reviewing the album for Esquire's Best Christmas Albums list, called Keys's vocals across the album's tracks "angelic". Chuck Arnolds of the New York Post ranked the project fourth among on his list of the 12 Best Christmas Albums of 2022.

== Commercial performance ==
In the United Kingdom, Santa Baby entered the UK Digital Albums chart at its peak of number 24. In the United States, the album debuted at number 148 on the Billboard 200 and number 19 on the Top Holiday Albums chart.

== Track listing ==
Santa Baby track listing
No.	Title	Writer(s)	Producer(s)	Length
1.	"Santa Baby"	Joan Javits; Philip Springer; Tony Springer	Alicia Keys	3:53
2.	"Christmas Time Is Here"	Vince Guaraldi; Lee Mendelson	Keys	3:26
3.	"My Favorite Things"	Richard Rodgers; Oscar Hammerstein II	Tommy Parker; Joshua "YNG Josh" Comerly^{[a]}	3:54
4.	"December Back 2 June"	Alicia Keys; Thomas Lumpkins; Taylor Monét; Em Walcott; Joshua Conerly	Keys	2:43
5.	"Please Come Home for Christmas"	Charles Brown; Gene Redd	Keys	3:17
6.	"Happy Xmas (War Is Over)"	John Lennon; Yoko Ono	Keys	4:05
7.	"You Don't Have to Be Alone"	Keys; Natalie Hemby	Keys	2:19
8.	"The Christmas Song (Chestnuts Roasting on an Open Fire)"	Robert Wells; Mel Tormé	Keys	2:47
9.	"Old Memories on Christmas"	Keys; Hemby	Keys	2:59
10.	"Not Even the King"	Keys; Emeli Sandé	Keys	3:00
11.	"Ave Maria"	Franz Schubert; Walter Scott	Keys	3:46
Total length:				36:09

=== Notes ===
- ^{^a} signifies a co-producer.

== Charts ==
Chart performance for Santa Baby
Chart (2022)	Peak position
UK Album Downloads (OCC)	24
US Billboard 200	148
US Independent Albums (Billboard)	7
US Top Holiday Albums (Billboard)	19

== Release history ==
Release dates and formats for Santa Baby
Region	Date	Format(s)	Label	Ref.
Various	November 4, 2022	CD; digital download; streaming	Alicia Keys Records	
