= Trillions (song) =

Single by Alicia Keys featuring Brent Faiyaz

from the album Keys II
- Released: August 23, 2022
- Studio: Jungle City (New York, NY); Larrabee (North Hollywood, CA)
- Length: 2:53
- Label: RCA
- Songwriters: Abraham Orellana; Alicia Keys; Christopher Wood
- Producers: Brent Faiyaz; Jordan Ware

Alicia Keys singles chronology
"City of Gods (Part II)" (2022)	"Trillions" (2022)	"December Back 2 June" (2022)

Brent Faiyaz singles chronology
"Price of Fame" (2022)	"Trillions" (2022)	"Don't Look at Numbers (Remix)" (2022)

Music video
- "Trillions" on YouTube

"Trillions" is a song by American singer-songwriter Alicia Keys featuring fellow American singer-songwriter Brent Faiyaz. The song was released as a single from Keys II (2022), which is a reissue edition of Keys' eighth studio album Keys (2021). The song itself is a reworked version of Keys' song "Billions", which is featured on Keys.

== Release and reception ==
On June 13, amid her Alicia + Keys World Tour, Keys announced that she will a release Keys II, a deluxe edition of her eighth studio album Keys (2021) on August 12, 2022. "Trillions" was one of the new songs on the album along with three other songs. "Trillions" is an R&B song and it was written by Keys, AraabMuzik, and Christopher Wood and produced by Faiyaz and Jordan Ware. The song marks the second collaboration between Keys and Faiyaz as Keys was first featured on Faiyaz's song "Ghetto Gatsby" from his album Wasteland (2022).

Jordan Farville from The Fader wrote that on the song "Keys is more than happy to swim in his screwed-up soup of paisley-colored crooning" and added that the song "could easily be a b-side from Faiyaz's new album Wasteland". ThatGrapeJuice called the song "catchy" and wrote that on the song's chorus, Keys "croons": "I am a one in a billion/you are a one in a billion/We got a one in a billion". Hayley Hynes from HotNewHipHop commented that as Faiyaz sings "Someone, someone that could treat you right/Someone that could change your life/Tell me where you hiding/I promise I will find you, I will, for real.” he adds "some crooning of his own" to the song. According to Christina Le Sirena from the website Artist Unlocked, the song contains "uplifting and encouraging" lyrics while "Faiyaz’s part in the song only adds more life to the already fruitful song". According to Jon Powell from Revolt, the song is an "ode to both love for others and love for self". In the United States, "Trillions" impacted R&B radio on August 23, 2022. The radio edit of the song was released on September 27, 2022.

== Music video ==
Keys released the music video for the song on August 12, 2022. The video was directed by Bobby Banks and Ramon Rivas. Keithan Samuels from Rated R&B wrote that "The colorful visual finds Keys and Faiyaz in a room, furnished only with a grand piano, vibing out to their collaboration". Paul Duong from Rap Radar wrote that in the video, Keys and Faiyaz are "Locked inside a studio beside a grand piano and basking under various colors of lights". Jordan Farville from The Fader commented that their "creative chemistry is apparent and carries the music video despite its relatively unremarkable visuals".

== Track listings ==
- Digital download
1. "Trillions" (Radio Edit) featuring Brent Faiyaz – 2:28
- Digital download
1. "Trillions" (Radio Edit - Explicit) featuring Brent Faiyaz – 2:28
- Digital download
1. "Trillions" (Album Version) featuring Brent Faiyaz – 2:53

== Credits and personnel ==
Adapted from Keys II liner notes.

Recording

- Recorded and engineered at Jungle City Studios, New York City and Larrabee Studios, North Hollywood, California
- Mixed at Jungle City Studios

Personnel

- Written by Alicia Keys, Abraham Orellana, Christopher Wood
- Produced by Brent Faiyaz and Jordan Ware
- Piano by Alicia Keys
- Engineered and recorded by Ann Mincieli
- Assisted by Franklin "Piece" Perez
- Mixed by Brendan Morawski

== Charts ==
=== Weekly charts ===
Weekly chart performance for "Trillions"
Chart (2022–2023)	Peak position
US R&B/Hip-Hop Airplay (Billboard)	23

=== Year-end charts ===
Year-end chart performance for "Trillions"
Chart (2022)	Position
US Adult R&B Songs (Billboard)	49

== Release history ==
Release history and formats for "Trillions"
Region	Date	Format	Version	Label	Ref.
United States	August 23, 2022	R&B radio		RCA	
Various	September 27, 2022	Streaming	Radio edit	RCA	
