= Come for Me =

Single by Alicia Keys featuring Khalid and Lucky Daye

from the album Keys
- Released: February 24, 2023
- Studio: Jungle City Studios (New York, NY); Perfect Sound (Los Angeles, CA); Sanctuary Studios (Nassau, Bahamas)
- Length: 3:29
- Label: RCA
- Songwriters: David Brown; BJ Burton; Jermaine Cole; Alicia Keys; Carter Lang; Khalid Robinson; Michael Williams II
- Producers: BJ Burton; Carter Lang; Mike Will Made It

Alicia Keys singles chronology
"December Back 2 June" (2022)	"Come for Me" (2023)	"If I Ain't Got You" (Orchestral Version) (2023)

Music videos
- "Come for Me (Unlocked)" on YouTube
- "Come for Me (Unlocked)" on YouTube

"Come for Me" (sometimes also credited as "Come for Me (Unlocked)") is a song by American singer and songwriter Alicia Keys featuring American singers Khalid and Lucky Daye. The song was released as the fourth single from Keys' eighth studio effort, the double album Keys (2021).

== Critical reception ==
NME found that Khalid "complements Keys sweetly" on the song, while Evening Standard critic David Smyth noted that Khalid and Daye provide "languorous sadness to "Come for Me"." Daniel Kreps from Rolling Stone noted it as the "standout" track on the Unlocked half on parent album Keys.

== Chart performance ==
"Come for Me" was released as a single in the United States on February 24, 2023. The song peaked at number one on the US Adult R&B Airplay chart in the week of June 10, 2023, becoming Keys' 14th chart topper.

== Music videos ==
On December 21, 2021, Keys released a self-directed music video for "Come for Me." Both Khalid and Lucky Daye appear in the video, in which they are recording the song in the studio and playing games with Keys over glasses of wine. In between the studio and home footage, Keys is seen admiring a full moon and the glittering New York City skyline.

On July 14, 2022, Keys unveiled a second music video for "Come for Me" ahead of the re-release of Keys II, a reissue edition of Keys, during the following month. According to Revolt, the visuals feature "a more artistic setting of sorts, complete with shots of the three vibing as footage plays on the wall behind them."

== Live performances ==
Keys performed the song during iHeartRadio Album Release Party airing on December 9.

== Credits and personnel ==
Adapted from Keys liner notes.

Recording

- Recorded and engineered at Jungle City Studios, New York City; Perfect Sound, Los Angeles, California; Sanctuary Studios Nassau, Bahamas
- Mixed at Larrabee Studios, North Hollywood, California

Personnel

- Written by Alicia Keys, David Brown, BJ Burton, Jermaine Cole, Carter Lang, Khalid Robinson and Michael Williams II
- Produced by Mike Will Made It, BJ Burton and Carter Lang
- Piano by Alicia Keys
- Background vocals by Alicia Keys, Khalid and Lucky Daye
- Engineered and recorded by Ann Mincieli
- Assisted by Franklin "Piece" Perez
- Engineered by Brendan Morawski
- Mixed by Manny Marroquin

== Charts ==
Chart performance for "Come for Me"
Chart (2023)	Peak position
US R&B/Hip-Hop Airplay (Billboard)	14

== Release history ==
Release history and formats for "Come for Me"
Region	Date	Format	Label	Ref.
United States	February 24, 2023	R&B radio	RCA	
