= Lala (Alicia Keys song) =

"Lala (Unlocked)"

Single by Alicia Keys featuring Swae Lee

from the album Keys
- Released: September 9, 2021
- Studio: Jungle City (New York, NY); Sanctuary (Nassau, Bahamas); Perfect Sound (Los Angeles, CA)
- Genre: R&B
- Length: 4:26
- Label: RCA
- Songwriters: Alicia Keys; Darryl Ellis; Khalif Brown; Michael L Williams II; Paul Richmond; Ruben Locke
- Producers: Alicia Keys; Mike Will Made It

Alicia Keys singles chronology
"Wasted Energy" (Remix) (2020)	"Lala (Unlocked)" (2021)	"Best of Me" (2021)

Swae Lee singles chronology
"In the Dark" (2021)	"Lala (Unlocked)" (2021)

Music video
- "Lala" on YouTube

"Lala (Unlocked)" (stylized as "LALA (Unlocked)") is a song by American singer Alicia Keys featuring fellow American rapper and singer Swae Lee. The song was written by the artists alongside Darryl Ellis, Ruben Locke, Paul Richmond, and Mike Will Made It, who produced it with Keys. It was released through RCA Records as the lead single from her eighth studio album, Keys, on September 9, 2021.

== Background and release ==
Keys announced the song on social media on September 1, posting a snippet of the song and the single's cover art. A 30-second snippet of the song was posted on Keys's YouTube channel on September 4, 2021. In an interview on Apple Music 1 with Zane Lowe, Keys explained the creative process of the collaboration:

"His energy and how we just wrote the song. It just felt so, it’s just like it’s tumbling from, I don’t know where it came from. …And so, but what I love about it is it’s so unexpected because you might see Swae featured on my record and you might expect something, or you might not expect something. I’m not sure what people expect, but what I love about it is I personally feel like you never heard Swae like this before".

== Composition ==
"Lala" is an R&B song that samples "In the Mood" by Tyrone Davis. Swae Lee sings on the track "Light the incense/ Not to mention/ Skin like whiskey/ She's cold like on the rocks". Keys sings "Feelings get lost in the lala".

== Critical reception ==
Rolling Stone called the song "sultry" and wrote that Keys and Lee "trade flirtatious lines" on the song. Rap-Up wrote that Keys and Lee "show off their chemistry as they trade love-drunk verses" on the "breezy" track. In his review of the album, Liam Inscoe-Jones from The Line of Best Fit called the song “slick”, but opined that the song should have been on the Originals side of the album.

== Live performances ==
Keys and Swae Lee performed the song at the 2021 MTV Video Music Awards on September 12, 2021. Their performance was broadcast from Liberty State Park. Rolling Stone wrote that Keys sang "sultry rendition" of the song while Vibe commented that Keys' and Lee's "creative chemistry translated from the studio to the big stage". USA Today ranked the performance as the fifth best performance of the show while Paste named it one of the best performances, commenting that "Swae Lee['s] heavily autotuned vocals were quite a contrast to Keys’ effortlessly smooth singing".

== Charts ==
Chart performance for "Lala (Unlocked)"
Chart (2021)	Peak position
US Hot R&B Songs (Billboard)	20
US Adult R&B Songs (Billboard)	25
