= Best of Me (Alicia Keys song) =

Single by Alicia Keys

from the album Keys
- Released: October 28, 2021
- Studio: Jungle City (New York, NY); Perfect Sound (Los Angeles, CA); Conway (Los Angeles, CA)
- Genre: R&B
- Length: 3:58 (Originals); 3:44 (Unlocked)
- Label: RCA
- Songwriters: Alicia Keys; Andrew Hale; Helen Adu; Raphael Saadiq; Stuart Matthewman; Barry White (Note: Only involved in the Unlocked version); Michael L. Williams
- Producers: Alicia Keys; Mike Will Made It

Alicia Keys singles chronology
"Lala" (2021)	"Best of Me" (2021)	"City of Gods" (2022)

Music video
- "Best of Me" on YouTube

"Best of Me" is a song by American singer and songwriter Alicia Keys. It was written by Keys, Andrew Hale, Sade, Raphael Saadiq, and Stuart Matthewman. Keys released two versions of the song, "Originals", produced solely by her, and "Unlocked", produced alongside Mike Will Made It, through RCA Records on October 28, 2021. The song serves as the second single from Keys' eighth studio album Keys.

== Background and release ==
Keys announced the song on social media on September 28, posting the single's cover art. In an interview with Entertainment Weekly, Keys commented that:

The zone on this song is so transportive. You're just transported to a whole other realm when you listen to this. [T]hey have a similar energy, "Best of Me (Original)" and "Best of Me (Unlocked)," but when you really get into it, you start to hear the nuances in how they are different, and how there's maybe a little more gentleness in the "Original" one, and a little more "Grrr" in the "Unlocked" one.

Additionally, in November 2021, Keys released a lullaby version of the song on Sweet Dreams extended play.

== Composition ==
The song samples "Cherish the Day" by Sade. Rap-Up described the song as a "slow-burning groove" while Jon Pareles from The New York Times described it as having "steady, diligent beat".

== Critical reception ==
Writing for The New York Times, Pareles found that "the track is hypnotic and open-ended, fading rather than resolving, as if it could go on and on". In his review of the album, Liam Inscoe-Jones from The Line of Best Fit wrote that the “broody” song “conjures an ice-cold vibe through clattering, propulsive drums and a deep bed of whirring synths; it’s simple, but conjures one hell of a mood with it”. He also commented that the remix version of the song “change[s] so little that you have to squint to spot the difference”.

== Live performances ==
Keys performed the song at Mercedes-EQ Concert Experience at Mercedes-Benz Manhattan on November 6, 2021. Keys performed the song at Apollo Theater for Sirius XM Small Stage Series. On December 10, Keys performed the song at Expo 2020 in Dubal, United Arab Emirates. Keys performed the song during iHeartRadio Album Release Party airing on December 9, as well as on Today on December 14, 2021.

== Track listing ==
- Streaming
1. "Best of Me" (Originals) – 3:58
2. "Best of Me" (Unlocked) – 3:49

== Music video ==
Keys released a music video for the original version on October 29, 2021.

== Charts ==
=== Weekly charts ===
Weekly chart performance for "Best of Me"
Chart (2021)	Peak position
US Adult R&B Songs (Billboard)	8

=== Year-end charts ===
Year-end chart performance for "Best of Me"
Chart (2022)	Position
US Adult R&B Songs (Billboard)	33

== Release history ==
Region	Date	Format	Label	Ref.
United States	November 9, 2021	Urban AC; Urban contemporary	RCA	
