= Keys (album) =

Studio album by Alicia Keys
- Released: December 10, 2021
- Studios: Conway (Los Angeles); Perfect Sound (Los Angeles); Sanctuary (Nassau, Bahamas); Jungle City (New York City); Kampo (New York City); MXM (Los Angeles); Oven Studios (New York City); The Church Studios (London, England); Larrabee Sound Studios (Los Angeles)
- Length: 93:24
- Label: RCA
- Producers: AraabMuzik; Fred Ball; BJ Burton; Alicia Keys; Carter Lang; Mike Will Made It; Jay Mooncie; Suzy Shinn; Swizz Beatz; VRon

Alicia Keys chronology
Alicia (2020)	Keys (2021)	Santa Baby (2022)

Singles from Keys
- 1. "Lala" Released: September 9, 2021; 2. "Best of Me" Released: October 28, 2021; 3. "Come for Me" Released: February 24, 2023

Keys is the eighth studio album by American singer and songwriter Alicia Keys, released through RCA Records on December 10, 2021; her last album released under the label as they parted ways in the summer of 2022. It was primarily produced by Keys. It was preceded by the release of two singles: "Lala" featuring Swae Lee and "Best of Me". The album was announced on October 27 and includes two discs (original and unlocked), with two versions of 10 tracks, along with six other tracks.

Keys is a double album. The first part features the more traditional and melodic original songs. The second half of the album features the unlocked versions of the same tracks, where Mike Will Made-It sampled the original tracks and gave them stronger beats and several effects and transformations. Some songs exist only either in their original or unlocked version. In the United States, the album debuted at number 41 on the Billboard 200, becoming Keys' first studio album to miss the top five in that country. It received mostly positive reviews, with critics highlighting Keys' production approach in particular, although some were critical of the quality behind the song composition. To support the album, Keys embarked on the Alicia + Keys World Tour.

== Conception and composition ==
The singer's eighth recording project consists of two parts: the first, called Originals, is described as "the classic side of me", while the second, Unlocked, is "a whole other sonic experience". The album features the singer as producer and songwriter on all twenty-six tracks, with numerous songwriters and producers participating, including Mike Will Made It, Sia, Raphael Saadiq, Natalie Hemby, and vocal collaborations from Khalid, Lil Wayne, Pusha T, Swae Lee, Brandi Carlile, and Jacob Collier.

After her album Alicia was released in September 2020, following a delay during the early months of the COVID-19 pandemic, Keys started to work on the album by writing alone in the studio as she did with her first albums. Keys, interviewed by Entertainment Weekly, said about the album:

"The pandemic hit; I didn't feel creative at all. I had lost my center and didn't really know how to find peace. [...] So I did get right back in and I knew that I wanted to do this album called Keys. And as I started to create it, I realized that it was a homecoming for me. It's so grounded in songwriting and raw expression. I didn't worry about production. [...] Me and my engineer Ann Mincieli started conversating about this concept about these two worlds. [...] She suggested I connect with [rap producer] Mike Will. And when I connected with Mike Will, it was instant vibes. [...] I like that you can choose your own adventure. You could do that thing where you're kind of A-B-ing it, or you can just ride out to what your energy is".

From the album's beginning, Keys had a vision to create an alternative and sampled side of the original album. Keys considered enlisting either Hit-Boy, Illangelo or Mike Will Made It to produce the unlocked side of the album. After the originals side was mainly completed, Keys connected with producer Mike Will, and began to work on the unlocked side with him in New York.

== Promotion and release ==
Keys debuted the album's lead single, "Lala" at the 2021 MTV Video Music Awards alongside Swae Lee. On October 31, Keys appeared on 1Xtra's R&B Show on BBC Radio 1Xtra in the United Kingdom. In November 2021, Keys appeared on the covers of Marie Claire in the United Kingdom and the United States, and Glamour Germany. Keys performed of songs from the album at the Mercedes-EQ Concert Experience, held at Mercedes-Benz Manhattan on November 6, 2021. As part of SiriusXM's and Pandora's Small Stage Series, Keys performed songs from the album at Apollo Theater on November 11, 2021. The show was the first of several intimate concert appearances staged by Keys during the unveiling of the new material. On December 1, Keys performed songs from the album at an intimate concert at Superblue art gallery during Art Basel in Miami Beach, Florida. On December 6, Keys appeared on Complex's 360 With Speedy Morman to talk about the album. Keys appeared on Extra on an episode airing on December 8. On December 9, Keys was featured on Drink Champs podcast on Revolt. The album was further promoted by an iHeartRadio album release party featuring an exclusive interview and performances by Keys on December 9.

During its first week of release, Keys appeared on Apple Music's R&B Now Radio to talk about the album with Ebro Darden and performed a concert at Expo 2020 in Dubal, United Arab Emirates on December 10. On December 12, Keys appeared on The Kris Fade Show on Virgin Radio Dubai. To talk about the album, Keys appeared on Australian TV-show Sunrise on December 13. On December 14, Keys appeared on the Fat Joe Show, Today and The One Show and performed "Old Memories" on The Voice. Keys was interviewed by Taylor Rooks from the National Basketball Association for 1 on 1 with Alicia Keys on December 15. Keys appeared on The Breakfast Club radio show on December 17. To showcase the album, Keys performed in concert at Maraya in Al-'Ula, Saudi Arabia on February 11, 2022.

=== Re-release Keys II ===
On July 14, 2022, Keys unveiled the music video for "Come for Me" featuring Khalid and Lucky Daye, ahead of a re-release of the album titled Keys II during the following month. In the United States, "Trillions" featuring Brent Faiyaz impacted R&B radio on August 23, 2022. "Come for Me" was released as a single in the United States on February 24, 2023.

== Critical reception ==
Keys ratings
Aggregate scores
Source	Rating
AnyDecentMusic?	6.4/10
Metacritic	65/100
Review scores
Source	Rating
AllMusic	3/5 stars
The Daily Telegraph	4/5 stars
Evening Standard	4/5 stars
The Guardian	2/5 stars
The Independent	3/5 stars
NME	3/5 stars
The Observer	3/5 stars
Rolling Stone	3.5/5 stars
Slant Magazine	3.5/5 stars
The Times	4/5 stars

Keys was met with generally positive reviews. At Metacritic, which assigns a normalized rating out of 100 to reviews from professional publications, the album received an average score of 65, based on 11 reviews.

Reviewing for Rolling Stone in December 2021, Jon Dolan found the project to consist of "two distinct, easily digestible collections", highlighting Originals as "the more self-assured of the two sets" and its first seven songs a "run of historical turns [that] is quintessential Keys". Dan Cairns of The Times wrote that the album as a whole is a "powerful reminder of just how original an artist she is", adding that "tracks such as Daffodil Mix 2/Daffodils, Skydive, Is It Insane and Nat King Cole point up to Keys' bracingly and often irreverent approach to music-making". Similarly, The Daily Telegraph's Neil McCormick said her production strives toward "epic" ballad styles and evocative trip hop tones, while The New York Times reviewer Jon Pareles applauded the album for how it "invites every listener to think like a producer, hearing the possibilities of timbre, propulsion, weight and context for every sound, while making clear how much those choices matter".

Other reviewers were less receptive. Alexis Petridis, writing for The Guardian, found Keys to be devoid of any major songs and instead reliant on the artist's creativity, which he said "can improve an average song but can't transform one into something extraordinary". AllMusic's Andy Kellman believed that "the songs are more likely to evoke a feeling than have a clear meaning".

== Commercial performance ==
In the United States, the album debuted at number 41 on the Billboard 200 and spent one week on the chart.

== Track listing ==
=== Side 1: Originals ===
Originals
No.	Title	Writer(s)	Producer(s)	Length
1.	"Plentiful" (featuring Pusha T)	Alicia Keys; Kasseem Dean; Dwight Grant; Kanye West; Graham Nash	Keys; Swizz Beatz	3:08
2.	"Skydive"	Keys; Raphael Saadiq; Kenton Nix	Keys	3:04
3.	"Best of Me"	Keys; Saadiq; Helen Adu; Andrew Hale; Stuart Matthewman	Keys; Sam Morton^{[b]}	3:59
4.	"Dead End Road"	Keys; Fredrik Ball; Dean McIntosh	Keys; Fred Ball	3:32
5.	"Is It Insane"	Keys	Keys	6:21
6.	"Billions"	Keys; Abraham Orellana	AraabMuzik	3:19
7.	"Love When You Call My Name"	Keys; Saadiq	Keys	3:37
8.	"Only You"	Keys; Saadiq	Keys	3:15
9.	"Daffodils"	Keys; Natalie Hemby	Keys	4:33
10.	"Old Memories"	Keys; Hemby	Keys	2:59
11.	"Nat King Cole"	Keys; Hemby; Marquel Middlebrooks; Michael Williams II; Bill Withers	Keys; Mike Will Made It	3:39
12.	"Paper Flowers" (featuring Brandi Carlile)	Keys; Brandi Carlile	Keys	3:24
13.	"Like Water"	Keys; Sia Furler; Mark Batson	Keys	3:57
14.	"Keys"	Keys	Keys	1:25
Total length:				50:12

Re-release Keys II: Originals bonus tracks
No.	Title	Writer(s)	Producer(s)	Length
14.	"Stay" (featuring Lucky Daye)	Keys; David Brown; Ilya Salmanzadeh; Robin "Rob Knox" Tadross	Ilya; Rob Knox	3:31
15.	"In Common" (Black Coffee remix)	Keys; Illangelo; Taylor Parks; Billy Walsh	Illangelo; Black Coffee	4:58

=== Side 2: Unlocked ===
Unlocked
No.	Title	Writer(s)	Producer(s)	Length
1.	"Only You"	Keys; Saadiq; Williams; Asheton Hogan; Pierre Slaughter	Keys; Mike Will Made It; Pluss^{[a]}; P-Nazty^{[a]}; Aaron Jhenke^{[b]}	3:11
2.	"Skydive"	Keys; Saadiq; Williams; Hogan; Nix	Keys; Mike Will Made It; Pluss^{[a]}	3:03
3.	"Best of Me"	Keys; Saadiq; Williams; Adu; Hale; Matthewman; Barry White	Keys; Mike Will Made It	3:43
4.	"Lala" (featuring Swae Lee)	Keys; Khalif Brown; Williams; Darryl Ellis; Paul Richmond; Ruben Locke	Keys; Mike Will Made It	4:31
5.	"Nat King Cole" (featuring Lil Wayne)	Keys; Dwayne Carter; Hemby; Middlebrooks; Williams; Withers	Keys; Mike Will Made It; Marzeratti^{[a]}	4:05
6.	"Is It Insane"	Keys; Hogan; Williams	Keys; Mike Will Made It	4:27
7.	"Come for Me" (featuring Khalid and Lucky Daye)	Keys; Khalid Robinson; David Brown; Jermaine Cole; Williams; Carter Lang; BJ Burton	Mike Will Made It; Lang; Burton	3:29
8.	"Old Memories"	Keys; Hemby; Shondrae Crawford; Williams	Keys; Mike Will Made It; Jhenke^{[b]}	3:52
9.	"Dead End Road"	Keys; Ball; McIntosh	Ball; Jay Mooncie	3:32
10.	"Love When You Call My Name"	Keys; Saadiq; Williams	Keys; Mike Will Made It	3:15
11.	"Daffodils"	Keys; Hemby; Williams	Keys; Mike Will Made It	3:04
12.	"Billions"	Keys; Orellana	Suzy Shinn; VRon	3:00
Total length:				43:12

Re-release Keys II: Unlocked bonus tracks

- "Keys" from the original release is added as track 1
- "Trillions" (featuring Brent Faiyaz) – 2:55 appears as track 14
  - Written by Keys, Abraham Orellana and Christopher Wood; produced by Faiyaz and Jordan Ware
- "In Common" (Kaskade radio mix) – 3:17 appears as track 15

Notes

- ^{^[a]} signifies a co-producer
- ^{^[b]} signifies an assistant producer
- On CD/physical releases of the album, side 1 (Originals) excludes "Paper Flowers", "Like Water" and "Keys", while side 2 (Unlocked) excludes "Dead End Road" and "Billions". The Keys II re-issue includes all these tracks on its physical releases.
- Pusha T is only featured on "Plentiful" on digital versions of the album

=== Sample credits ===
- Side 1 – Originals
  - "Plentiful" contains a sample of "The Truth", written by Dwight Grant, Kanye West, performed by Beanie Sigel; and an interpolation of "Chicago", written and performed by Graham Nash.
  - "Skydive" contains a sample of "Heartbeat", written by Kenton Nix, performed by Taana Gardner.
  - "Best of Me" contains a sample of "Cherish the Day", written by Helen Adu, Andrew Hale, and Stuart Matthewman, performed by Sade.
- Side 2 – Unlocked
  - "Skydive" contains a sample of "Heartbeat", written by Kenton Nix, performed by Taana Gardner.
  - "Best of Me" contains a sample of "Cherish the Day", written by Helen Adu, Andrew Hale, and Stuart Matthewman, performed by Sade; and an interpolation of "Strange Games & Things", written by Barry White and performed by The Love Unlimited Orchestra.
  - "Lala" contains a sample of "In the Mood", written by Darryl Ellis, Paul Richmond, Ruben Locke, performed by Tyrone Davis.

== Personnel and credits ==
=== Originals ===
Recording locations

- Conway Recording Studios – Los Angeles, California (3, 9, 12–13)
- Jungle City Studios – New York City, New York (1–4, 6–7, 9–13)
- Kampo Studios – New York City, New York (5)
- Perfect Sound – Los Angeles, California (1–3, 5–12)
- Sanctuary Studios – Nassau, Bahamas (12)
- MXM Studios – Los Angeles, California (14)
- The Church Studios – London, England (14)
- Oven Studios – New York City, New York (14)

Musicians

- Alicia Keys – vocals (1–13), piano (1–12, 14), background vocals (2, 7–12), programming (2, 8, 10, 11), synthesizer (2, 3)
- Ken Lewis – bass (1, 11), piano, strings (1); drum machine (2), guitar (3, 11), horn (11)
- Dom Rivinius – drums (1, 3, 11), organ (1)
- Raphael Saadiq – background vocals, piano (2, 7, 8); bass (2), keyboards (3), guitar (7, 8)
- Fred Ball – bass, organ, piano, programming (4)
- Steve Jordan – drums (5)
- AraabMuzik – programming (6)
- Adam Blackstone – bass (8–10)
- Steve Wolf – drums (8–10)
- Natalie Hemby – background vocals, piano (9, 10)
- Tim Stewart – electric guitar (10)
- Gabriel Vivas – bass (11)
- Tyrone Johnson – guitar (11)
- Marzeratti – programming (11)
- Mike Will Made It – programming (11)
- Davide Rossi – strings (11)
- Brandi Carlile – background vocals, guitar (12)
- Mark Batson – piano (13)

Technical

- Dave Kutch – mastering
- Brendan Morawski – mixing (1–3, 6, 7), engineering (1–4, 6–9, 11)
- Ann Mincieli – mixing (3, 6, 8–10, 12, 13), engineering (1–12), recording (1, 2, 4–8, 11, 13)
- Manny Marroquin – mixing (4)
- George Massenburg – mixing (5)
- Jaycen Joshua – mixing (11)
- Jonathan Garcia – engineering (1, 2)
- Aaron Jhenke – engineering assistance (1–3, 5–12)
- Kevin Peterson – engineering assistance (1, 4–12)
- Anthony Vilchis – engineering assistance (4)
- Zach Pereyra – engineering assistance (4)
- Eric Eylands – engineering assistance (9)
- Sam Morton – engineering assistance (10, 12)
- DJ Riggins – engineering assistance (11)
- Jacob Richards – engineering assistance (11)
- Kamron Krieger – engineering assistance (11)
- Lou Carrao – engineering assistance (11, 12)
- Mike Seaberg – engineering assistance (11)
- Rich Evatt – engineering assistance (11)

=== Unlocked ===
Recording locations

- Jungle City Studios – New York City, New York (2–10, 12–13)
- Perfect Sound – Los Angeles, California (1–3, 7, 10, 12)
- Sanctuary Studios – Nassau, Bahamas (4–8)
- Larrabee Sound Studios – Los Angeles, California (13)

Musicians

- Alicia Keys – vocals (all tracks), piano (1–3, 5–8, 10–12), background vocals (2, 5–8, 10, 11), synthesizer (2, 3, 7, 8), keyboards (7, 8), programming (9)
- Adam Blackstone – bass (1, 11)
- Mike Will Made It – drum machine (1, 4, 7, 8, 11), programming (2, 5, 6, 10)
- P-Nazty – drum machine (1), programming (2, 5, 6)
- Steve Wolf – drums (1, 11)
- Raphael Saadiq – guitar (1, 10), piano (1, 2, 10), background vocals (2, 10), bass (2), keyboards (3)
- Ken Lewis – drums (2), guitar (3, 5), bass, horn (5)
- Pluss – programming (2)
- Austin Paul – saxophone (2)
- Dom Rivinius – drums (3, 5)
- Tyrone Johnson – electric guitar (4), guitar (5)
- Gabriel Vivas – bass (5, 6)
- Davide Rossi – strings (5)
- Kamala Sankaram – accordion (6)
- Khalid – background vocals (7)
- Lucky Daye – background vocals (7)
- Jacob Collier – background vocals, choir, piano (8)
- Natalie Hemby – background vocals (8, 11), piano (11)
- Bangladesh – drum machine (8)
- Fred Ball – bass, guitar, organ, piano, programming (9)
- Oscar Soans-Burne – guitar (9)
- Celisse – guitar (12)
- Vron – programming (12)
- Suzy Shinn – programming (12)

Technical

- Dave Kutch – mastering
- Jaycen Joshua – mixing (1–6, 8)
- Manny Marroquin – mixing (7, 9, 12)
- Brendan Morawski – engineering
- Ann Mincieli – engineering (1, 2, 4–12), recording (1–3, 5–12)
- Dom Rivinius – engineering (2)
- Nathan Feler – engineering (12)
- Fred Ball – recording (9)
- DJ Riggins – engineering assistance (1–6, 8, 10, 11)
- Jacob Richards – engineering assistance (1–6, 8, 10, 11)
- Mike Seaberg – engineering assistance (1–6, 8, 10, 11)
- Aaron Jhenke – engineering assistance (2, 3, 5–7, 10–12)
- Kamron Krieger – engineering assistance (2, 3, 5–8, 11)
- Lou Carrao – engineering assistance (2, 3, 5–8, 11)
- Rich Evatt – engineering assistance (5–8, 11)
- Anthony Vilchis – engineering assistance (7, 9, 12)
- Kevin Peterson – engineering assistance (7–9, 12)
- Zach Pereyra – engineering assistance (7, 9, 12)

== Charts ==
Chart performance for Keys
Chart (2021–2022)	Peak position
Belgian Albums (Ultratop Flanders)	92
Belgian Albums (Ultratop Wallonia)	109
French Albums (SNEP)	163
German Albums (Offizielle Top 100)	49
Swiss Albums (Schweizer Hitparade)	18
UK Album Downloads (Official Charts)	9
UK R&B Albums (Official Charts)	5
US Billboard 200	41
US Top R&B/Hip-Hop Albums (Billboard)	17

== Release history ==
Release dates and formats for Keys
Region	Date	Format(s)	Version	Label(s)	Ref.
Various	December 10, 2021	Digital download; streaming	Original	RCA	
United States	February 4, 2022	CD	Original	RCA	
United States	August 12, 2022	CD; vinyl	Keys II re-release	RCA	
