= List of songs written by Alicia Keys =

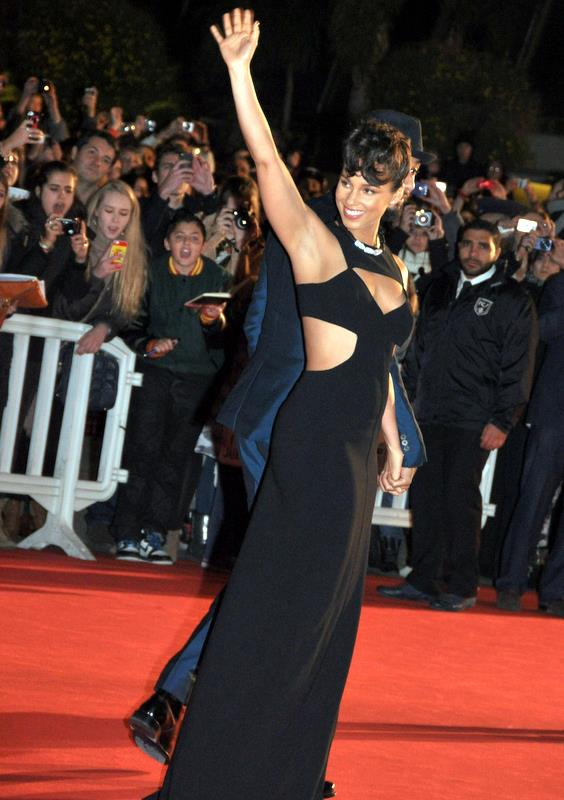
Alicia Keys in 2013

American musician Alicia Keys has written and produced for her five studio albums, in collaborations, for other artists and for film and theater. Keys began composing songs she would later include on her debut studio album Songs in A Minor at age 14. She signed with Columbia Records at age 15, later leaving Columbia to sign with Arista Records and then J Records. Prior to the release of Songs in A Minor in June 2001, her song "Girlfriend" was released to US radio in earlier in the year as a promotional song "to introduce" Keys. It was co-written by Keys with Jermaine Dupri and Joshua Thompson and contains a sample of Ol' Dirty Bastard's track "Brooklyn Zoo". The album's official first single, "Fallin'", written and produced solely by Keys, topped the US Billboard Hot 100 chart. "A Woman's Worth", written by Keys and Erika Rose, is a "jazz-tinged" song with lyrical content on how men should treat and respect women.

Keys released her second album, The Diary of Alicia Keys, in December 2003. In addition to working with previous collaborator Kerry Brothers, Jr., Keys also collaborated with several others for the album. Keys co-produced the song "Heartburn" with Timbaland and worked with Kanye West on "You Don't Know My Name". Several of the songs were written solely by Keys, including "Harlem's Nocturne", "Dragon Days", "Feeling U, Feeling Me" (Interlude), and the single "If I Ain't Got You", and she produced most of the album herself. A music journalist for The Times wrote that The Diary of Alicia Keys "confirmed her place in musical history".

Her third studio album, As I Am, was released in November 2007. Keys wrote several of the songs with collaborator Kerry Brothers, Jr., including "Go Ahead" and "Where Do We Go from Here". She also collaborated with Linda Perry on the songs "The Thing About Love", "Sure Looks Good to Me", and "Superwoman", for which she was awarded the Grammy Award for Best Female R&B Vocal Performance in 2009. The songs "As I Am" (Intro) and "Prelude to a Kiss" were written solely by Keys.

The Element of Freedom, Keys' fourth studio album, was released in December 2009; it was preceded by the lead single "Doesn't Mean Anything", co-written with Kerry Brothers, Jr. During this time, Keys collaborated with Jay-Z on "Empire State of Mind". Keys recorded her version of the song for The Element of Freedom entitled "Empire State of Mind (Part II) Broken Down"; she also collaborated with Alejandro Sanz on "Looking for Paradise". On The Element of Freedom, she wrote a number of the songs with longtime collaborator Kerry Brothers, Jr., including "Love is My Disease" and "This Bed". Keys solely wrote and produced "That's How Strong My Love Is". She also collaborated with Drake on "Un-Thinkable (I'm Ready)" and featured Beyoncé on "Put It in a Love Song". Keys' fifth album, Girl on Fire was released in November 2012. The title track was accompanied by two remixes: one featuring rap verses by Nicki Minaj, and the other Keys signing in a stripped back production. Keys collaborated with Scottish singer Emeli Sandé on three songs for the album: "101", "Not Even the King", and the second single, "Brand New Me", a piano ballad about personal growth, produced by Keys.

== Songs ==
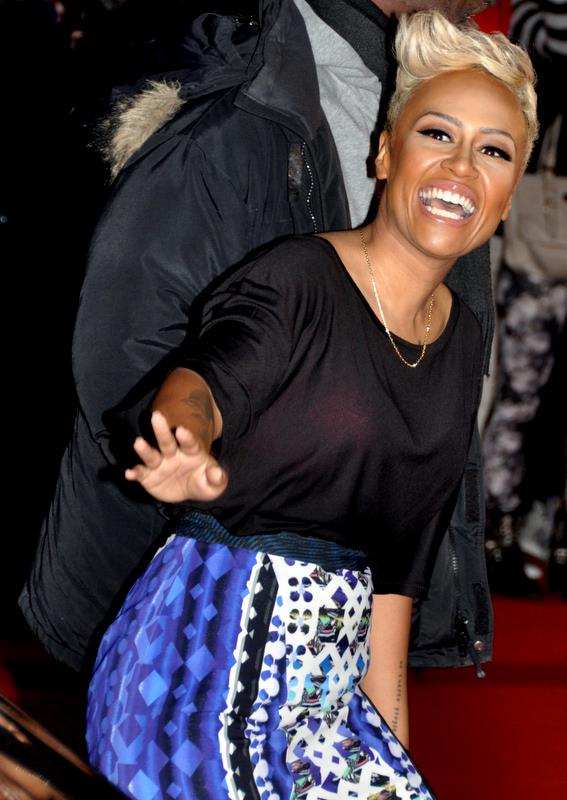
Keys co-wrote three songs with Emeli Sandé (pictured) for the former's album, Girl on Fire (2012), including "Brand New Me", produced by Keys. Keys wrote and produced for Sandé's album Our Version of Events (2012)

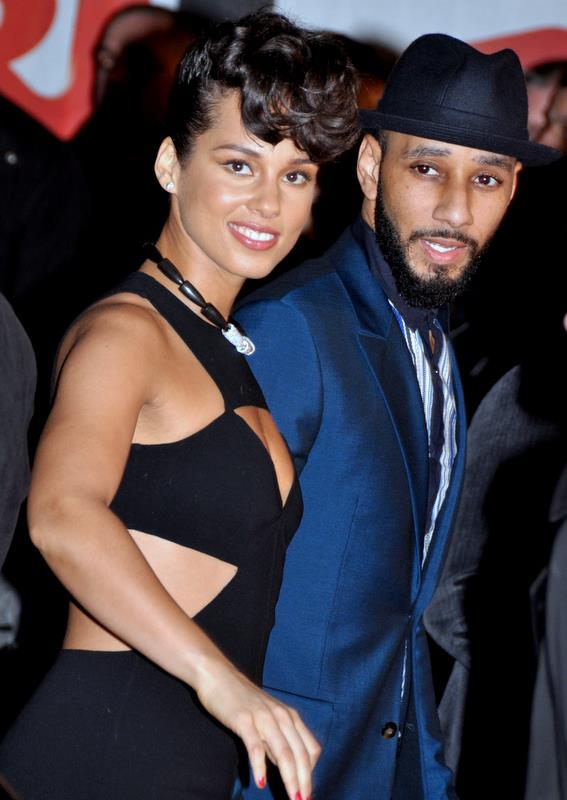
Keys has written and produced several songs with her husband, Swizz Beatz (both pictured) including "New Day", Whitney Houston's "Million Dollar Bill", "Wait Til You See My Smile" and "Put It in a Love Song" featuring Beyoncé.

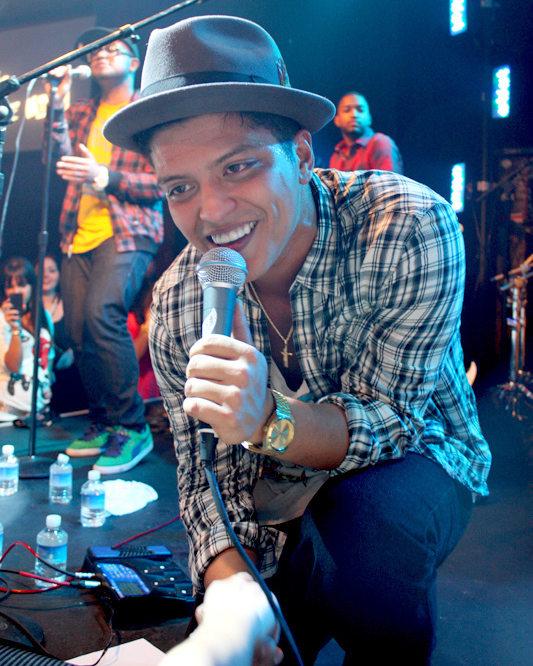
Keys co-wrote the song "Tears Always Win" with Bruno Mars.

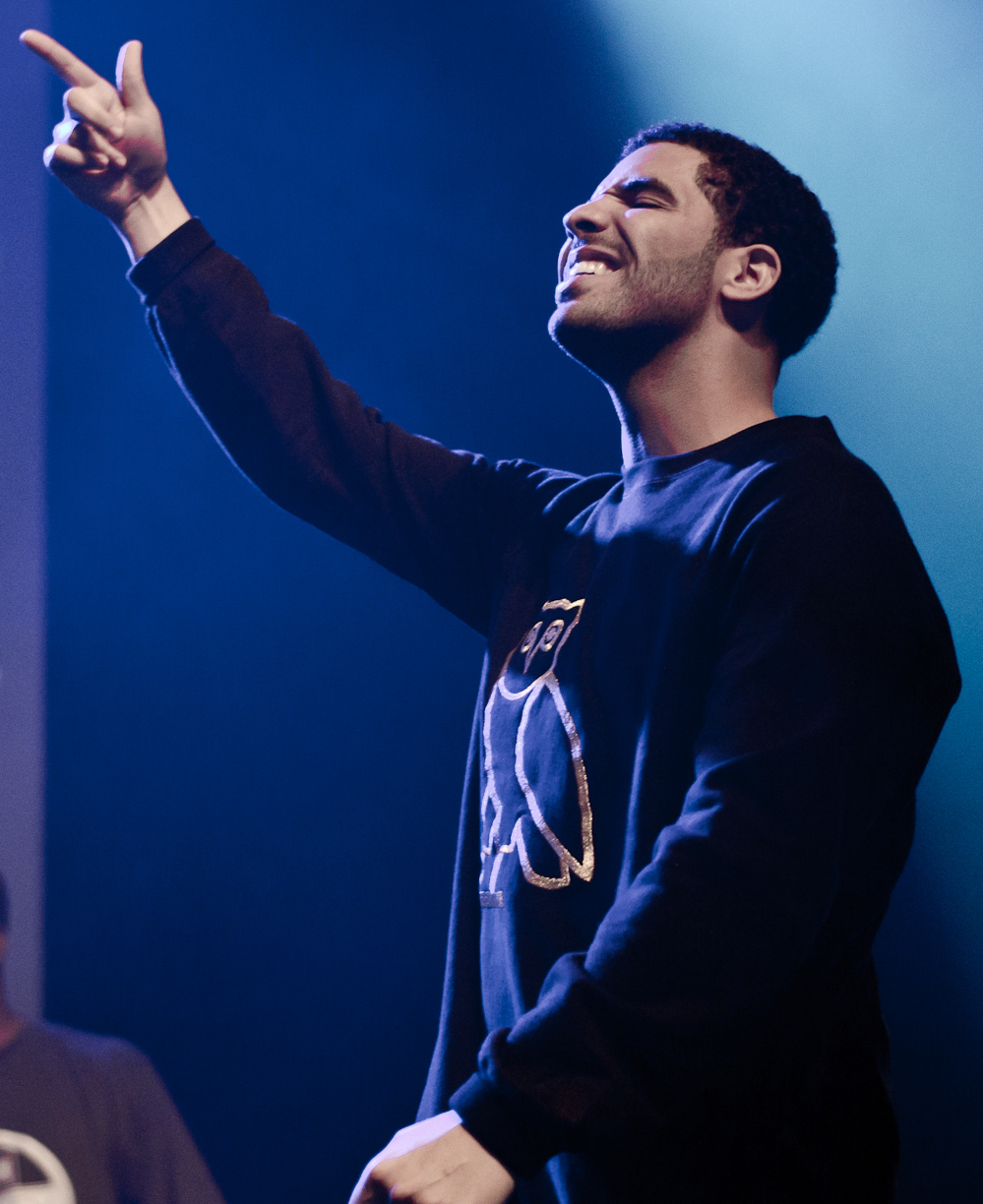
Keys' collaborated with Drake on her song "Un-Thinkable (I'm Ready)" and on his songs "Fireworks" and "Preach".

Key
†	Indicates single release
‡	Indicates song written solely by Keys

List of songs written or co-written by Alicia Keys
Song	Artist(s)	Writer(s)	Album	Year	Ref.
"101"	Alicia Keys	Alicia Keys; Emeli Sandé	Girl on Fire	2012	
"2 Train"	Mario	Alicia Keys ‡	Mario	2002	
"28 Thousand Days" †	Alicia Keys	Alicia Keys; Mark Batson; Harold Lilly	—N/a	2015	
"3 Hour Drive"	Alicia Keys featuring Sampha	Alicia Keys; Sampha Sisay; Jimmy Napes	Alicia	2021	
"A Beautiful Noise" †	Alicia Keys with Brandi Carlile	Alicia Keys; Brandi Carlile; Brandy Clark; Hailey Whitters; Hillary Lindsey; Linda Perry; Lori McKenna; Ruby Amanfu	Songs in A Minor	2001	
"A Woman's Worth" †	Alicia Keys	Alicia Keys; Erika Rose	Songs in A Minor	2001	
"Ain't No Reason"	Christina Milian	Alicia Keys; Harold Lilly; Kerry Brothers, Jr. Richard Harrison; Taneisha Smith	Be Cool	2005	
"Angel"	Jennifer Hudson	Alicia Keys ‡	I Remember Me	2011	
"As I Am" (Intro)	Alicia Keys	Alicia Keys	As I Am	2007	
"Authors of Forever"	Alicia Keys	Alicia Keys; Johnny McDaid; Jonny Coffer	Alicia	2021	
"Better You, Better Me" †	Alicia Keys	Alicia Keys; Marsha Ambrosius; Steve Mostyn	The Inevitable Defeat of Mister & Pete	2013	
"Back to Life" †	Alicia Keys	Alicia Keys; Carlo Montagnese; Billy Walsh	Queen of Katwe	2016	
"Blended Family (What You Do for Love)" †	Alicia Keys	Alicia Keys; Rakim Mayers; John Bush; Brandon Aly; Latisha Hyman; Dave Kuncio; Kenneth Withrow; Edie Brickell; John Houser	Here	2016	
"Brand New Me" †	Alicia Keys	Alicia Keys; Emeli Sandé	Girl on Fire	2012	
"Butterflyz"	Alicia Keys	Alicia Keys ‡	Songs in A Minor	2001	
"Caged Bird"	Alicia Keys	Alicia Keys ‡	Songs in A Minor	2001	
"Cocoa Butter" (Cross & PicInterlude)	Alicia Keys	Alicia Keys ‡	Here	2016	
"Da Life"	—N/a	Alicia Keys; Cobey Saleem Brown; Lemoyne Smith	—N/a	Unknown	
"Dah Dee Dah (Sexy Thing)"	Alicia Keys	Alicia Keys; Reese Johnson; Taneisha Smith	Men in Black	1997	
"De Novo Adagio" (Intro)	Alicia Keys	Alicia Keys ‡	Girl on Fire	2012	
"Diary" †	Alicia Keys featuring Tony! Toni! Toné!	Alicia Keys; Kerry Brothers, Jr.	The Diary of Alicia Keys	2003	
"Distance and Time"	Alicia Keys	Alicia Keys; Kerry Brothers, Jr. Steve Mostyn	The Element of Freedom	2009	
"Djin Djin"	Angélique Kidjo featuring Alicia Keys and Branford Marsalis	Alicia Keys; Angélique Kidjo; Jean Louis Pierre Hebrail	Djin Djin	2007	
"Doncha Know (Sky Is Blue)"	Alicia Keys	Alicia Keys; Linda Perry	As I Am	2008	
"Doesn't Mean Anything" †	Alicia Keys	Alicia Keys; Kerry Brothers, Jr.	The Element of Freedom	2009	
"Don't Look Down"	Jennifer Hudson	Alicia Keys; Salaam Remi	I Remember Me	2011	
"Dragon Days"	Alicia Keys	Alicia Keys ‡	The Diary of Alicia Keys	2003	
"Dreaming"	Alicia Keys	Alicia Keys ‡	"Doesn't Mean Anything"	2009	
"Elaine Brown" (Interlude)	Alicia Keys	Alicia Keys ‡	Here	2016	
"Elevate" (Interlude)	Alicia Keys	Alicia Keys ‡	Here	2016	
"Empire State of Mind" †	Jay-Z featuring Alicia Keys	Al Shuckburgh; Alicia Keys; Angela Hunte; Bert Keyes; Janet "Jnay" Sewell-Ulepic; Shawn Carter; Sylvia Robinson	The Blueprint 3	2009	
"Empire State of Mind (Part II) Broken Down" †	Alicia Keys	Al Shuckburgh; Alicia Keys; Angela Hunte; Bert Keyes; Janet "Jnay" Sewell-Ulepic; Shawn Carter; Sylvia Robinson	The Element of Freedom	2009	
"Everybody Needs Love"	Jennifer Hudson	Kendrick Dean; Alicia Keys	I Remember Me	2011	
"Fallin'" †	Alicia Keys	Alicia Keys ‡	Songs in A Minor	2001	
"Family Business" (Alternate title: "Live on When I Die")	—N/a	Alicia Keys; Christian Faloye; Kerry Brothers, Jr. Rondell Turner	—N/a	Unknown	
"Feeling U, Feeling Me" (Interlude)	Alicia Keys	Alicia Keys ‡	The Diary of Alicia Keys	2003	
"Fire We Make" †	Alicia Keys with Maxwell	Alicia Keys; Andrew Wansel; Gary Clark, Jr. Warren Felder	Girl on Fire	2012	
"Fireworks"	Drake featuring Alicia Keys	Alicia Keys; Aubrey Graham; Christian Kalla; Matthew Samuels; Noah Shebib	Thank Me Later	2010	
"Ghetto Story Chapter 2" †	Cham featuring Alicia Keys and Akon	Alicia Keys; Aliaune Thiam; Dameon Beckett	Ghetto Story	2006	
"Ghettoman"	Alicia Keys featuring MuMs da Schemer	Alicia Keys; Craig Grant; Kerry Brothers, Jr. Bernard Malik (Doss)	Songs in A Minor 10th Anniversary Edition	2011	
"Girl Can't Be Herself"	Alicia Keys	Alicia Keys; Mark Batson; Shawn Martin; Harold Lilly	Here	2016	
"Girl on Fire" †	Alicia Keys	Alicia Keys; Billy Squier; Jeff Bhasker; Salaam Remi	Girl on Fire	2012	
"Girlfriend" †	Alicia Keys	Alicia Keys; Jermaine Dupri; Joshua Thompson	Songs in A Minor	2001	
"Go Ahead"	Alicia Keys	Alicia Keys; Kerry Brothers, Jr. Mark Batson; Marsha Ambrosius	As I Am	2007	
"Good Job" †	Alicia Keys	Alicia Keys; Avery Chambliss; Kasseem Dean; Terius Nash	Alicia	2021	
"Goodbye"	Alicia Keys	Alicia Keys ‡	Songs in A Minor	2001	
"Gramercy Park"	Alicia Keys	Alicia Keys; Jimmy Napes; Sam Romans	Alicia	2021	
"Hallelujah"	Alicia Keys	Alicia Keys; James Napier	Here	2016	
"Harlem's Nocturne"	Alicia Keys	Alicia Keys ‡	The Diary of Alicia Keys	2003	
"Heartburn"	Alicia Keys	Alicia Keys; Candice Nelson; Erika Rose; Tim Mosley; Walter Millsap III	The Diary of Alicia Keys	2003	
"Heaven's Door"	Alicia Keys	Alicia Keys; Kerry Brothers, Jr.	The Element of Freedom	2009	
"Holy War"	Alicia Keys	Alicia Keys; Carlo Montagnese; Billy Walsh	Here	2016	
"Hope"	Emeli Sandé	Alicia Keys; Emeli Sandé	Our Version of Events	2012	
"How It Feels to Fly"	Alicia Keys	Alicia Keys; Kerry Brothers, Jr.	The Element of Freedom	2009	
"I Am Many"		Alicia Keys; Thomas Newman		2015	
"(I Just Want It) To Be Over"	Keyshia Cole	Keyshia Cole; Alicia Keys; Kerry Brothers Jr. Taniesha Smith	The Way It Is	2005	
"I Need You"	Alicia Keys	Alicia Keys; Harold Lilly; Mark Batson; Paul Green	As I Am	2007	
"I Won't (Crazy World)"	Alicia Keys	Alicia Keys; Kerry Brothers, Jr.	Songs in A Minor 10th Anniversary Edition	2011	
"If I Ain't Got You" †	Alicia Keys	Alicia Keys ‡	The Diary of Alicia Keys	2003	
"Illusion of Bliss"	Alicia Keys	Alicia Keys; Mark Batson; Kasseem Dean; Harold Lilly	Here	2016	
"Impossible"	Christina Aguilera	Alicia Keys ‡	Stripped	2002	
"In Common" †	Alicia Keys	Alicia Keys; Illangelo; Tayla Parks; Billy Walsh	Here	2016	
"It's On Again" †	Alicia Keys featuring Kendrick Lamar	Alicia Keys; Kendrick Duckworth; Pharrell Williams; Hans Zimmer	The Amazing Spider-Man 2	2014	
"Jane Doe"	Alicia Keys	Alicia Keys; Kandi Burruss	Songs in A Minor	2001	
"Jill Scott"	Alicia Keys featuring Jill Scott	Alicia Keys; Kasseem Dean; Delano Matthews; Jill Scott	Alicia	2021	
"Juiciest"	Alicia Keys	Alicia Keys; James Mtume; Kerry Brothers, Jr.	Songs in A Minor 10th Anniversary Edition	2011	
"Kaleidoscope" †	Alicia Keys	Alicia Keys; Ben Billions; Breyan Isaac; Gamal Kosh Lewis	Music from Hell's Kitchen Broadway Musical	2024	
"Karma" †	Alicia Keys	Alicia Keys; Kerry Brothers, Jr. Taneisha Smith	The Diary of Alicia Keys	2003	
"Kill Your Mama"	Alicia Keys	Alicia Keys; Emeli Sandé	Here	2016	
"Lesson Learned"	Alicia Keys featuring John Mayer	Alicia Keys; John Mayer	As I Am	2007	
"Lifeline" †	Alicia Keys	Alicia Keys; Tom Barnes; Pete Kelleher; Ben Kohn; Michael Matosic; Jake Torrey	The Color Purple (Music From and Inspired By)	2023	
"Like the Sea"	Alicia Keys	Alicia Keys; Jeff Bhasker	The Element of Freedom	2009	
"Like You'll Never See Me Again" †	Alicia Keys	Alicia Keys; Kerry Brothers, Jr.	As I Am	2007	
"Limitedless"	Alicia Keys	Alicia Keys; Amber Streeter; Andrew Wansel; Gary Clark, Jr. Stacy Barthe; Warren Felde	Girl on Fire	2012	
"Listen to Your Heart"	Alicia Keys	Alicia Keys; John Stephens	Girl on Fire	2012	
"Por Favor" †	Pitbull and Fifth Harmony	Armando C. Pérez; Jamie Sanderson; Philip Kembo; Madison Love; Usher Raymond; Alicia Keys; Jermaine Dupri; Adonis Shropshire; Manuel Seal; Barry White	Fifth Harmony	2017	
"Looking for Paradise" †	Alejandro Sanz featuring Alicia Keys	Alejandro Sanz; Alicia Keys; Tommy Torres	Paraíso Express	2009	
"Love Is Blind"	Alicia Keys	Alicia Keys; Jeff Bhasker	The Element of Freedom	2009	
"Love Is My Disease"	Alicia Keys	Alicia Keys; Kerry Brothers, Jr. Meleni Smith; Toby Gad	The Element of Freedom	2009	
"Love Looks Better" †	Alicia Keys	Alicia Keys; Ryan Tedder; Larrance Dopson; Noel Zancanella; Christopher "Brody" Brown	Alicia	2021	
"Lover Man"	Alicia Keys	Alicia Keys; Kerry Brothers, Jr.	The Element of Freedom	2009	
"Lovin' U"	Alicia Keys	Alicia Keys ‡	Songs in A Minor	2001	
"Me x 7"	Alicia Keys featuring Tierra Whack	Alicia Keys; Christopher Stewart; Patrick Postlewait; Samuel Kirk Thomas; Jeremiah Bethea; J. Pierre Medor; Tierra Whack	Alicia	2021	
"Million Dollar Bill" †	Whitney Houston	Alicia Keys; Kasseem Dean; Norman Harris	I Look to You	2009	
"More Than We Know"	Alicia Keys	Alicia Keys; Latisha Hyman; Mark Batson; Shawn Martin; Harold Lilly	Here	2016	
"Mr. Man"	Alicia Keys featuring Jimmy Cozier	Alicia Keys; Jimmy Cozier; Taneisha Smith	Songs in A Minor	2001	
"My Boo" †	Usher and Alicia Keys	Alicia Keys; Adonis Shropshire; Jermaine Dupri; Manuel Seal; Usher Raymond	Confessions	2004	
"New Day" †	Alicia Keys	Alicia Keys; Amber "Sevyn" Streeter; Andre Brissett; Andre Young; Kasseem Dean; Trevor Lawrence Jr.	Girl on Fire	2012	
"New Day" †	50 Cent featuring Dr. Dre and Alicia Keys	Alicia Keys; Amber Streeter; Andre Young; Andrew Brissett; Curtis Jackson; Kasseem Dean; Marshall Mathers; Ryan D. Montgomery; Trevor Lawrence, Jr.	Street King Immortal	2012	
"No One" †	Alicia Keys	Alicia Keys; George Harry; Kerry Brothers, Jr.	As I Am	2007	
"Nobody Not Really"	Alicia Keys	Alicia Keys; Taneisha Smith	The Diary of Alicia Keys	2003	
"Not Even the King"	Alicia Keys	Alicia Keys; Emeli Sandé	Girl on Fire	2012	
"Ocean Skies"	Ludacris featuring Monica	Christopher Bridges; Ian D'Sa Benjamin Kowalewicz; Crystal Nicole Johnson-Pompey; Alicia Augello-Cook	Ludaversal	2015	
"One Thing"	Alicia Keys	Alicia Keys; Frank Ocean; James Ho	Girl on Fire	2012	
"Over"	—N/a	Alicia Keys; Damien Clark; Issiah J Avila; Paul Lamont Green	—N/a	Unknown	
"Pawn It All"	Alicia Keys	Alicia Keys; Mark Batson; Kasseem Dean; Harold Lilly	Here	2016	
"Perfect Way to Die"	Alicia Keys	Alicia Keys; Sebastian Kole	Alicia	2021	
"Piano & I"	Alicia Keys	Alicia Keys	Songs in A Minor	2001	
"Por Favor" †	Pitbull and Fifth Harmony	Armando C. Pérez; Jamie Sanderson; Philip Kembo; Madison Love; Usher Raymond; Alicia Keys; Jermaine Dupri; Adonis Shropshire; Manuel Seal; Barry White	Fifth Harmony	2017	
"Pray for Forgiveness"	Alicia Keys	Alicia Keys; Linda Perry	The Element of Freedom	2009	
"Preach" †	Drake featuring PartyNextDoor	Aubrey Graham; Jahron Brathwaite; Alicia Augello-Cook; Kerry Brothers, Jr. Edwin Jantunen; Noah Shebib	If You're Reading This It's Too Late	2015	
"Prelude to a Kiss"	Alicia Keys	Alicia Keys ‡	As I Am	2007	
"Put It in a Love Song" †	Alicia Keys featuring Beyoncé	Alicia Keys; Kasseem Dean	The Element of Freedom	2009	
"Put Me On"	Mario	Alicia Keys; Bertram Charles Reid Jr. Kerry Brothers, Jr. Norman A. Durham; Ronald Dean Miller; Woodrow Cunningham Jr.	Mario	2002	
"Queen of the Field (Patsey's Song)"	Alicia Keys	Alicia Keys ‡	12 Years a Slave	2013	
"Raise a Man" †	Alicia Keys	Alicia Keys; Larrance Dopson; Terius Nash; Khirye Tyler	—N/a	2019	
"Rear View Mirror"	Alicia Keys	Alicia Keys; Fred Jerkins III; Kerry Brothers, Jr. L. Green; LaShawn Daniels; Rodney Jerkins	Songs in A Minor	2001	
"Rock wit U"	Alicia Keys	Alicia Keys; Kerry Brothers, Jr. Taneisha Smith	Songs in A Minor	2001	
"Samsonite Man"	Alicia Keys	Alicia Keys; Erika Rose	The Diary of Alicia Keys	2003	
"Saviour"	Alicia Keys	Alicia Keys; Harold Lilly; Jack Splash; Paul Lamont Green	As I Am	2008	
"She Don't Really Care_1 Luv"	Alicia Keys	Alicia Keys; Kasseem Dean; Tyrone Johnson; Edwin Birdsong; Kamaal Fareed; Ali Shaheed Muhammad; William Allen; Roy Ayers; Walter Booker; Charles Stepney; DJ Silent Assassin	Here	2016	
"Show Me Love" †	Alicia Keys featuring Miguel	Alicia Keys; Daystar Peterson; Morgan Matthews; Miguel Pimentel	Alicia	2021	
"Sleep Sound" †	Jamie xx	Jamie Smith; Alicia Keys; Kerry Brothers; George Forrest; Taneisha Smith; Robert Wright	In Colour	2015	
"Slow Down"	Alicia Keys	Alicia Keys; Erika Rose; L. Green	The Diary of Alicia Keys	2003	
"So Done" †	Alicia Keys featuring Khalid	Alicia Keys; Ludwig Göransson; Khalid Robinson	Alicia	2021	
"So Simple"	Alicia Keys	Alicia Keys; Andre Harris; Harold Lilly; Vidal Davis	The Diary of Alicia Keys	2003	
"Speechless"	Alicia Keys featuring Eve	Alicia Keys; Eve Jeffers; Kassim Dean	non-album release	2010	
"Stay" †	Henry Krinkle	Alicia Augello-Cook; Kerry Brothers, Jr. Aubrey Graham Drake; Edwin Jantunen; Noah Shebib		2014	
"Stolen Moments"	Alicia Keys	Alicia Keys; Kerry Brothers, Jr.	The Element of Freedom	2009	
"Streets of New York"	Alicia Keys featuring Nas & Rakim	Alicia Keys; Chris Martin; Eric Barrier; Nasir Jones; Taneisha Smith; William Griffin	The Diary of Alicia Keys	2003	
"Superwoman" †	Alicia Keys	Alicia Keys; Linda Perry; Steve Mostyn	As I Am	2007	
"Sure Looks Good to Me"	Alicia Keys	Alicia Keys; Linda Perry	As I Am	2007	
"Tears Always Win" †	Alicia Keys	Alicia Keys; Bruno Mars; Jeff Bhasker; Phillip Lawrence	Girl on Fire	2012	
"Teenage Love Affair" †	Alicia Keys	Alicia Keys; Carl Hampton; Harold Lilly; Jack Splash; Josephine Bridges; Tom Nixon	As I Am	2007	
"Tell You Something (Nana's Reprise)"	Alicia Keys	Alicia Keys; Kerry Brothers, Jr. L. Green; Novel Stevenson; Ron Haney; Steve Mostyn	As I Am	2007	
"That's How Strong My Love Is"	Alicia Keys	Alicia Keys ‡	The Element of Freedom	2009	
"That's When I Knew"	Alicia Keys	Alicia Keys; Antonio Dixon; Kenny Edmonds	Girl on Fire	2012	
"The Beginning" (Intro)	Alicia Keys	Alicia Keys ‡	Here	2016	
"The Element of Freedom" (Intro)	Alicia Keys	Alicia Keys ‡	The Element of Freedom	2009	
"The Gospel"	Alicia Keys	Alicia Keys; Mark Batson; Kasseem Dean; Shawn Martin; Robert Diggs; Jason Hunter; Corey Woods	Here	2016	
"The Life"	Alicia Keys	Alicia Keys; Kerry Brothers, Jr. Taneisha Smith	Songs in A Minor	2001	
"The Thing About Love"	Alicia Keys	Alicia Keys; Linda Perry	As I Am	2007	
"This Bed"	Alicia Keys	Alicia Keys; Kerry Brothers, Jr. Steve Mostyn	The Element of Freedom	2009	
"Through It All"	Alicia Keys	Alicia Keys; Kerry Brothers, Jr.	The Element of Freedom	2009	
"Time Machine" †	Alicia Keys	Alicia Keys; Sebastian Kole; Robin Tadross	Alicia	2021	
"Troubles"	Alicia Keys	Alicia Keys; Kerry Brothers, Jr.	Songs in A Minor	2001	
"Try Sleeping with a Broken Heart" †	Alicia Keys	Alicia Keys; Jeff Bhasker; Patrick Reynolds	The Element of Freedom	2009	
"Truth Without Love"	Alicia Keys	Alicia Keys; Larrance Dopson; Khirye Tyler; Kasseem Dean; Terius Nash; Justus Alexander West; Damien Romel Farmer	Alicia	2021	
"Typewriter"	Alicia Keys	Alicia Keys; Kerry Brothers, Jr.	Songs in A Minor 10th Anniversary Edition	2011	
"Un-Thinkable (I'm Ready)" †	Alicia Keys	Alicia Keys; Aubrey Graham; Kerry Brothers, Jr. Noah Shebib	The Element of Freedom	2009	
"Unbreakable" †	Alicia Keys	Alicia Keys; Garry Glenn; Harold Lilly; Kanye West	Unplugged	2005	
"Underdog" †	Alicia Keys	Alicia Keys; Johnny McDaid; Jonny Coffer; Ed Sheeran; Foy Vance; Amy Wadge	Alicia	2021	
"Us" †	Alicia Keys with James Bay	Alicia Keys; James Bay; Jonathan Green	Electric Light	2018	
"Wait Til You See My Smile" †	Alicia Keys	Alicia Keys; Jeff Bhasker; Kasseem Dean	The Element of Freedom	2009	
"Waiting for Your Love"	Alicia Keys	Alicia Keys; Kasseem Dean; Sean Garrett; Wynton Marsalis	As I Am	2007	
"Wake Up"	Alicia Keys	Alicia Keys; Kerry Brothers, Jr.	The Diary of Alicia Keys	2003	
"Warrior Song"	Nas featuring Alicia Keys	Alicia Keys; Fela Kuti; Nasir Jones	God's Son	2002	
"Wasted Energy"	Alicia Keys featuring Diamond Platnumz	Alicia Keys; Richard Isong; Ariowa Irosognie; Nathaniel Warner; Kali McLoughlin	Alicia	2021	
"We Are Here" †	Alicia Keys	Alicia Keys; Kasseem Dean; Harold Lilly; Mark Batson	non-album release	2014	
"When It's All Over"	Alicia Keys	Alicia Keys; John Stephens; Stacy Barthe	Girl on Fire	2012	
"When You Really Love Someone"	Alicia Keys	Alicia Keys; Kerry Brothers, Jr.	The Diary of Alicia Keys	2003	
"Where Do We Begin Now"	Alicia Keys	Alicia Keys; Mark Batson; Harold Lilly	Here	2016	
"Where Do We Go from Here"	Alicia Keys	Alicia Keys; Harold Lilly; Johnnie Frierson; Kerry Brothers, Jr. Mary Frierson	As I Am	2007	
"Where's the Fun in Forever"	Miguel featuring Alicia Keys	Alicia Keys; Andrew Wansel; Miguel Pimentel; Steve Mostyn; Warren Felde	Kaleidoscope Dream	2012	
"Why Do I Feel So Sad"	Alicia Keys	Alicia Keys; Warryn Campbell	Songs in A Minor	2001	
"With You"	Marsha Ambrosius	Marsha Ambrosius; Alicia Keys	Late Nights & Early Mornings	2011	
"Work on It"	Alicia Keys	Alicia Keys; Pharrell Williams	Here	2016	
"Wreckless Love"	Alicia Keys	Alicia Keys; Harold Lilly; Jack Splash	As I Am	2007	
"You Don't Know My Name" †	Alicia Keys	Alicia Keys; Harold Lilly; J. R. Bailey; Kanye West; Ken Williams; Mel Kent	The Diary of Alicia Keys	2003	
"You Glow" (Interlude)	Alicia Keys	Alicia Keys ‡	Here	2016	
"You Save Me"	Alicia Keys featuring Snoh Aalegra	Alicia Keys; Snoh Nowrozi	Alicia	2021	

== See also ==
- Alicia Keys discography
- List of awards and nominations received by Alicia Keys
