= Freedom Tour =

2010 concert tour by Alicia Keys

The Freedom Tour
- Tour by Alicia Keys
- Promotional poster for Keys' 2010 world tour
- Associated album: The Element of Freedom
- Start date: February 26, 2010
- End date: July 3, 2010
- Legs: 3
- No. of shows: 26 in North America; 23 in Europe; 1 in Africa; 50 Total
- Box office: US$29.4 million ($43.41 in 2025 dollars)

Alicia Keys concert chronology
- As I Am Tour (2008); The Freedom Tour (2010); Piano & I: A One Night Only Event (2011)

The Freedom Tour was the fourth concert tour by American singer-songwriter Alicia Keys in support of her fourth studio album, The Element of Freedom (2009). The tour commenced at the Scotiabank Place in Ottawa on February 26, 2010. The tour continued onto North America visiting Europe as well. In June, Keys headlined one concert in Johannesburg, South Africa. According to Pollstar, the tour grossed $29.4 million worldwide, with 43 shows.

== Background ==
Keys announced her forthcoming tour in December 2009, shortly after the release of her fourth studio album. During the same time, Keys was named R&B/Hip-Hop Artist of the Decade by Billboard magazine. When describing the tour, Keys mentions,

The show is, obviously, always focused around music; that's what is always my main focus. When we first start putting it all together, it all starts at the music, and then it's what story that I want to tell and kind of what energy I want to give off. There's going to be something for everyone in this show because that's who I am, I am a person who feels things from all different angles and directions, and I'm going to express it that way ... and that's how I arm-wrestle people who are close-minded.

== Opening acts ==
- Robin Thicke (North America)
- Melanie Fiona (North America and Europe)

== Set list ==
North America
1. "Caged Bird"
2. "Love Is Blind"
3. "You Don't Know My Name" (contains elements of "Flashing Lights")
4. "Fallin'"
5. "Another Way To Die"
6. "Karma" (contain elements of "Once in a Lifetime")
7. "Heartburn" (contains elements of "I Feel For You")
8. "I Need You"
9. "Pray for Forgiveness"
10. "Diary"
11. "Like You'll Never See Me Again"
12. "Wait Til You See My Smile"
13. "Go Ahead"
14. "Un-Thinkable (I'm Ready)"
15. "Try Sleeping with a Broken Heart"
16. "Superwoman"
17. "If I Ain't Got You"
18. "No One"

Encore

19. "Empire State of Mind (Part II) Broken Down"
Europe
1. "Love Is Blind"
2. "You Don't Know My Name" (contains elements of "Flashing Lights")
3. "Fallin'"
4. "Go Ahead"
5. "Another Way to Die"
6. "Karma" (contain elements of "Once in a Lifetime")
7. "Pray for Forgiveness"
8. "Diary"
9. "If I Ain't Got You"
10. "Like You'll Never See Me Again"
11. "Wait Til You See My Smile"
12. "Try Sleeping with a Broken Heart"
13. "Superwoman"
14. "Unthinkable (I'm Ready)"
15. "Doesn't Mean Anything"
16. "No One"

Encore

17. "Empire State of Mind Part II (Broken Down)"
Notes
- On selected dates in North America, Keys performed "Troubles", "Put It in a Love Song", and "Like the Sea".
- During Keys' concert at Madison Square Garden in New York City, she was joined by Beyoncé to perform "Put It in a Love Song" and later Swizz Beatz and Jay-Z to perform "Empire State of Mind."
- During Key's concert at Gelredome in Arnhem she dedicated a song to her mother and asked the audience to say "Happy Birthday Mama Keys". In the Netherlands Keys also played her song "Like the Sea" just after "Karma".

== Tour dates ==
Date	City	Country	Venue
North America
February 26, 2010	Ottawa	Canada	Scotiabank Place
February 28, 2010	Montreal	Canada	Bell Centre
March 3, 2010	Rosemont	United States	Allstate Arena
March 5, 2010	Detroit	United States	Fox Theatre
March 6, 2010	Detroit	United States	Fox Theatre
March 8, 2010	London	Canada	John Labatt Centre
March 10, 2010	Toronto	Canada	Air Canada Centre
March 11, 2010	Verona	United States	Turning Stone Event Center
March 13, 2010	Mashantucket	United States	MGM Grand Theater
March 14, 2010	Mashantucket	United States	MGM Grand Theater
March 17, 2010	New York City	United States	Madison Square Garden
March 19, 2010	Newark	United States	Prudential Center
March 20, 2010	Atlantic City	United States	Mark G. Etess Arena
March 22, 2010	Boston	United States	Agganis Arena
March 24, 2010	Baltimore	United States	1st Mariner Arena
March 25, 2010	Washington, D.C.	United States	Verizon Center
March 27, 2010	Miami	United States	American Airlines Arena
March 28, 2010	Tampa	United States	St. Pete Times Forum
March 30, 2010	Atlanta	United States	Philips Arena
April 2, 2010	Grand Prairie	United States	Nokia Theatre at Grand Prairie
April 3, 2010	Houston	United States	Toyota Center
April 6, 2010	Los Angeles	United States	Staples Center
April 7, 2010	Santa Barbara	United States	Santa Barbara Bowl
April 9, 2010	Las Vegas	United States	Mandalay Bay Events Center
April 10, 2010	Oakland	United States	Oracle Arena
Europe
April 29, 2010	Lisbon	Portugal	Pavilhão Atlântico
May 1, 2010^{[A]}	Ischgl	Austria	Silvrettaseilbahn AG
May 2, 2010	Verona	Italy	Verona Arena
May 4, 2010	Marseille	France	Le Dôme de Marseille
May 7, 2010	Berlin	Germany	O_{2} World
May 8, 2010	Arnhem	Netherlands	GelreDome XS
May 9, 2010	Frankfurt	Germany	Festhalle Frankfurt
May 12, 2010	Hamburg	Germany	O_{2} World Hamburg
May 13, 2010	Oberhausen	Germany	König Pilsener Arena
May 15, 2010	Antwerp	Belgium	Sportpaleis
May 17, 2010	Zürich	Switzerland	Hallenstadion
May 19, 2010	Birmingham	England	National Indoor Arena
May 21, 2010	Dublin	Ireland	The O_{2}
May 22, 2010^{[B]}	Bangor	Wales	Vaynol Park
May 23, 2010	Glasgow	Scotland	SECC Hall 4
May 25, 2010	London	England	The O_{2}
May 26, 2010	London	England	The O_{2}
May 29, 2010	Manchester	England	Manchester Evening News Arena
May 31, 2010	Paris	France	Palais Omnisports de Paris-Bercy
June 2, 2010	Barcelona	Spain	Palau Sant Jordi
June 4, 2010	Lyon	France	Halle Tony Garnier
June 6, 2010	Santa Cruz de Tenerife	Spain	Autoridad Portuaria de Santa Cruz
Africa
June 10, 2010 ^{[C]}	Johannesburg	South Africa	Orlando Stadium
North America
July 3, 2010 ^{[D]}	New Orleans	United States	Louisiana Superdome

Festivals and other miscellaneous performances
^{A} This concert is a part of Festival Ischgl/Top of the Mountain Concert
^{B} This concert is part of the BBC Radio 1's Big Weekend Music Festival.
^{C} This concert is part of the FIFA World Cup Kick-off Celebration Concert.
^{D} This concert is part of the Essence Music Festival

=== Box office score data ===
Venue	City	Tickets Sold / Available	Gross Revenue
Bell Centre	Montreal	6,620 / 7,880 (84%)	$632,023
Fox Theater	Detroit	8,142 / 8,590 (95%)	$677,636
John Labatt Centre	London	4,827 / 6,025 (80%)	$375,358
Verizon Center	Washington, D.C.	9,087 / 13,085 (69%)	$827,593
Philips Arena	Atlanta	9,099 / 9,099 (100%)	$643,646
Nokia Theatre at Grand Prairie	Grand Prairie	4,192 / 5,826 (72%)	$382,709
Staples Center	Los Angeles	14,539 / 15,115 (96%)	$1,134,106
Santa Barbara Bowl	Santa Barbara	3,395 / 4,547 (75%)	$326,392
O_{2} World	Berlin	6,231 / 6,231 (100%)	$360,516
O_{2} World Hamburg	Hamburg	6,224 / 8,769 (71%)	$461,704
National Indoor Arena	Birmingham	10,870 / 10,870 (100%)	$634,808
The O_{2}	Dublin	8,061 / 8,061 (100%)	$671,964
SECC Hall 4	Glasgow	8,736 / 8,736 (100%)	$522,719
The O_{2} Arena	London	32,333 / 32,396 (~100%)	$1,850,460
Manchester Evening News Arena	Manchester	15,414 / 15,414 (100%)	$896,216
Palais Omnisports de Paris-Bercy	Paris	16,460 / 16,460 (100%)	$1,068,820
TOTAL		164,230 / 177,104 (93%)	$11,446,670
