= Doesn't Mean Anything =

2009 single by Alicia Keys

Single by Alicia Keys

from the album The Element of Freedom
- B-side: "Dreaming"
- Released: September 15, 2009
- Studio: Oven (New York City); Conway (Los Angeles)
- Length: 4:35
- Label: J
- Songwriters: Alicia Keys; Kerry Brothers, Jr.
- Producers: Kerry "Krucial" Brothers; Alicia Keys

Alicia Keys singles chronology
"Empire State of Mind" (2009)	"Doesn't Mean Anything" (2009)	"Looking for Paradise" (2009)

Music video
- "Doesn't Mean Anything" on YouTube

"Doesn't Mean Anything" is a song recorded by American singer-songwriter Alicia Keys. It written and produced by Keys and longtime partner Kerry "Krucial" Brothers for her fourth studio album The Element of Freedom (2009), with its lyrics speaking about the importance of love against materialism and fake needs. The song was released as the lead single from The Element of Freedom on September 15, 2009, by J Records.

"Doesn't Mean Anything" received widespread critical acclaim upon its release. However, it became Keys' least commercially successful lead single at the time as it peaked at number 60 on the US Billboard Hot 100, thus becoming her first lead single not to peak within the top three til “In Common” (2016) and “Underdog” (2020). It fared better internationally, reaching the top ten in Germany, Japan, Mexico, Switzerland and the United Kingdom.

== Background ==
Keys called the song as "very different—it almost feels like you're flying. It has that piano, heavy-drum feeling." She elaborated the song's meaning, saying, "You dream of having all these things, you dream of going all these places. But what's the point of doing that, having that, if the one you want to be there isn't with you?" The song was released through Keys' YouTube channel on September 22, 2009, after her performance at the 2009 MTV Video Music Awards along Jay-Z, singing "Empire State of Mind".

== Reception ==
=== Chart performance ===
The single was released on the iTunes Store on September 22, 2009 and debuted on the Billboard Hot R&B/Hip-Hop Songs at number 32, making her highest debut on that chart, and has peaked at number 14. It has also debuted on the Billboard Hot 100 at number 61, making it her highest debut since "No One", which debuted at number 71. It also appeared on the Canadian Hot 100 at number 66. Although it had a higher debut than "No One", "Doesn't Mean Anything" failed to chart high on the Billboard Hot 100, unlike the lead single from her previous album. It is one of Keys' least successful singles to date in the United States and her second lowest peaking song on the Billboard Hot 100. "Doesn't Mean Anything" was released on November 30, 2009 in the United Kingdom. Keys performed the song on The X Factor on November 29, 2009, with a medley of "Empire State of Mind (Part II) Broken Down" and "No One". It debuted at number eight on the UK Singles Chart, becoming Keys highest-charting debut there since "Fallin'" in 2001, and her seventh top ten single in the UK. "Doesn't Mean Anything" peaked at number four on the UK R&B Singles Chart and has spent, so far, fourteen weeks on the UK Singles Chart.

=== Critical reception ===
The song received positive reviews from the critics. Mariel Concepcion of Billboard magazine gave the song a positive review, commenting that "A truly confident woman lets herself be vulnerable at the right time" and compared favorably the song to Keys' previous hits 'No One' and 'Superwoman' by saying that "the comparisons are more than welcome, because—as Keys understands so well—everyone needs love, no matter how independent they may be." Nick Levine of Digital Spy gave the song a favorable review, saying that "the production is classic and gimmick-free, the chorus has the same timeless feel that turned 'No One' and 'If I Ain't Got You' into modern standards, and the whole thing oozes class the way a ripe brie oozes cheesey goodness" and then adding "the words 'classic' and 'timeless' apply to the lyrics too."

== Music video ==
The music video for "Doesn't Mean Anything" was filmed on September 27–28, 2009. It was directed by P. R. Brown. The video was released on October 19, 2009. In the behind-the-scenes of the video, Keys explained the representation of the mountain climb scene, "Because we all have mountains to climb in our life you know? And you can reach the top, you can climb and you can make it. And as you observe the landscape, the question is 'Are you gonna fly or are you gonna fall?'. And I'm gonna fly, and we all gonna fly." The video ranked at number 42 on BET's Notarized: Top 100 Videos of 2009 countdown.

The music video begins with Keys walking onto the balcony of her New York City apartment, looking out at the city uttering the words, "This beautiful city seems empty. All the people in the world and you can still feel lonely. What's the point of having it all without the person you love. Sometimes you just need to start again in order to fly." The song then starts to play, with Keys playing the piano in her apartment, and also scenes of her sitting on the couch, and looking out of the window at the sunset. Various objects around the apartment then start to disappear, including a photograph on the piano of her and her lover. The scene then changes once her surroundings have all eventually disappeared, showing Keys in a new outfit, in the middle of a desert-like setting (that appears to be the Grand Canyon), with her piano. She is then seen to walk up the path she is on, eventually leading to a mountain. Keys then climbs the mountain, and once she has reached the top, looks out at the landscape surrounding her.

== Track listings ==
- Digital download and European and Australian CD single
1. "Doesn't Mean Anything" – 4:39
2. "Dreaming" – 4:32
- Digital EP
1. "Doesn't Mean Anything" – 4:35
2. "Dreaming" – 4:32
3. "Doesn't Mean Anything" (music video)
- US promotional 12-inch vinyl
1. "Doesn't Mean Anything" – 4:38
2. "Doesn't Mean Anything" (instrumental) – 4:38
3. "Put It in a Love Song" (featuring Beyoncé) – 3:16
4. "Put It in a Love Song" (instrumental) – 3:09

== Charts ==
=== Weekly charts ===
Chart (2009)	Peak position
Australia (ARIA)	96
Austria (Ö3 Austria Top 40)	15
Belgium (Ultratip Bubbling Under Flanders)	10
Belgium (Ultratop 50 Wallonia)	22
Canada Hot 100 (Billboard)	66
Czech Republic Airplay (ČNS IFPI)	31
Euro Digital Songs (Billboard)	7
European Hot 100 Singles (Billboard)	15
France Download (SNEP)	17
Germany (GfK)	8
Ireland (IRMA)	34
Italy (FIMI)	20
Japan Hot 100 (Billboard)	3
Mexico Ingles Airplay (Billboard)	10
Netherlands (Dutch Top 40)	27
New Zealand (Recorded Music NZ)	22
Scottish Singles Sales (Official Charts)	7
Slovakia Airplay (ČNS IFPI)	31
Spain (Promusicae)	22
Spain Airplay (PROMUSICAE)	5
Switzerland (Schweizer Hitparade)	5
UK Singles (Official Charts)	8
UK Hip Hop/R&B (Official Charts)	4
US Billboard Hot 100	60
US Adult R&B Songs (Billboard)	2
US Hot R&B/Hip-Hop Songs (Billboard)	14
US Rhythmic Airplay (Billboard)	18
US Smooth Jazz Airplay (Billboard)	19

=== Year-end charts ===
Chart (2009)	Position
Italy (FIMI)	65
Japan Adult Contemporary (Billboard)	42
UK Singles (OCC)	160
US Hot R&B/Hip-Hop Songs (Billboard)	95

Chart (2010)	Position
Brazil (Crowley)	34
European Hot 100 Singles (Billboard)	96
Japan (RIAJ Digital Track Chart)	52
Japan Adult Contemporary (Billboard Japan)	15
UK Singles (OCC)	157

== Certifications ==
Region	Certification	Certified units/sales
United Kingdom (BPI)	Silver	200,000^{^}
United States (RIAA)	Gold	500,000^{‡}
^{^} Shipments figures based on certification alone.^{‡} Sales+streaming figures based on certification alone.

== Release history ==
Release dates and formats for "Doesn't Mean Anything"
Region	Date	Format(s)	Label(s)	Ref.
United States	September 15, 2009	Digital download	J	
United Kingdom	September 22, 2009	Digital download	RCA	
United States	September 22, 2009	Rhythmic contemporary radio	J	
United States	October 20, 2009	Contemporary hit radio	J	
Germany	November 20, 2009	CD	Sony Music	
Australia	November 30, 2009	CD	Sony Music	
