= The Platinum Collection (Alicia Keys album) =

2010 box set by Alicia Keys

Box set by Alicia Keys
- Released: May 4, 2010
- Length: 176:46
- Label: J; Jive
- Producer: Alicia Keys; Clive Davis; Peter Edge; Jeff Robinson; Kerry Brothers Jr.; Jermaine Dupri; Brian McKnight; Kandi Burruss; Jimmy Cozier; Miri Ben-Ari; Arden Altino; Timbaland; Kanye West; D'wayne Wiggins; Kumasi; Dre & Vidal; Easy Mo Bee; Mark Batson; Dirty Harry; Linda Perry; John Mayer; Jack Splash

Alicia Keys chronology
The Element of Freedom (2009)	The Platinum Collection (2010)	Girl on Fire (2012)

The Platinum Collection is a box set by American recording artist Alicia Keys. It contained Keys' first three studio albums, Songs in A Minor (2001), The Diary of Alicia Keys (2003) and As I Am (2007). The box set was released on May 10, 2010, in United States through J Records. It peaked at number twenty on UK Albums Chart, also peaking on charts in Ireland, Portugal, Spain and Switzerland. It was certified Silver by British Phonographic Industry (BPI) for selling over 60,000 copies in United Kingdom.

== Commercial performance ==
The Platinum Collection only peaked on charts in European countries: in United Kingdom, Ireland, Spain, Portugal and Switzerland. It was also certified Silver by British Phonographic Industry (BPI) for selling over 60,000 copies in United Kingdom. It failed to chart in United States.

== Track listing ==
The Platinum Collection – Disc one (Songs in A Minor)
No.	Title	Writer(s)	Length
1.	"Piano & I"	Alicia Keys	1:52
2.	"Girlfriend"	Keys; Jermaine Dupri; Joshua Thompson	3:34
3.	"How Come You Don't Call Me"	Prince	3:57
4.	"Fallin'"	Keys	3:29
5.	"Troubles"	Keys; Kerry Brothers Jr.	4:28
6.	"Rock wit U"	Keys; Taneisha Smith; Brothers	5:36
7.	"A Woman's Worth"	Keys; Erika Rose	5:02
8.	"Jane Doe"	Keys; Kandi Burruss	3:48
9.	"Goodbye"	Keys	4:20
10.	"The Life"	Keys; Smith; Brothers	5:25
11.	"Mr. Man" (featuring Jimmy Cozier)	Keys; Cozier	4:09
12.	"Never Felt This Way" (Interlude)	Brian McKnight	2:01
13.	"Butterflyz"	Keys	4:08
14.	"Why Do I Feel So Sad"	Keys; Warryn Campbell	4:25
15.	"Caged Bird"	Keys	3:02
16.	"Lovin' U" (hidden track)	Keys	3:49
Total length:			63:04

The Platinum Collection – Disc two (The Diary of Alicia Keys)
No.	Title	Writer(s)	Producer(s)	Length
1.	"Harlem's Nocturne"		Alicia Keys	1:43
2.	"Karma"	Tenisha Smith; Kerry Brothers Jr.	Kerry Brothers Jr.	4:16
3.	"Heartburn"	Tim Mosley; Erika Rose; Walter Millsap III; Candice Nelson	Timbaland; Keys	3:28
4.	"If I Was Your Woman" / "Walk on By"	Burt Bacharach; Hal David; Gloria Jones; Pam Sawyer; Clarence McMurray	Easy Mo Bee; Keys; D'wayne Wiggins	3:06
5.	"You Don't Know My Name"	Harold Lilly; Kanye West; Ken Williams; Mel Kent; J. R. Bailey	West; Keys	6:08
6.	"If I Ain't Got You"		Keys	3:48
7.	"Diary" (featuring Tony! Toni! Toné!)	Brothers Jr.	Keys	4:45
8.	"Dragon Days"		Keys	4:36
9.	"Wake Up"	Brothers Jr.	Keys	4:27
10.	"So Simple" (featuring Lellow*)	Lilly; Andre Harris; Vidal Davis	Dre & Vidal	3:49
11.	"When You Really Love Someone"	Brothers Jr.	Keys	4:09
12.	"Feeling U, Feeling Me" (Interlude)		Keys	2:07
13.	"Slow Down"	Rose; Lamont Green	Keys; Kumasi	4:18
14.	"Samsonite Man"	Rose	Keys; Kerry "Krucial" Brothers	4:12
15.	"Nobody Not Really"	Smith	Keys	2:56
Total length:				57:45

The Platinum Collection – Disc three (As I Am)
No.	Title	Writer(s)	Producer(s)	Length
1.	"As I Am" (Intro)		Kerry "Krucial" Brothers	1:52
2.	"Go Ahead"	Mark Batson; Marsha Ambrosius; Brothers Jr.	Batson	4:35
3.	"Superwoman"	Linda Perry; Steve Mostyn	Kerry "Krucial" Brothers	4:34
4.	"No One"	Brothers Jr.; George D. Harry	Kerry "Krucial" Brothers	4:13
5.	"Like You'll Never See Me Again"	Brothers Jr.	Kerry "Krucial" Brothers	5:15
6.	"Lesson Learned" (featuring John Mayer)	John Mayer	John Mayer	4:13
7.	"Wreckless Love"	Harold Lilly; Jack Splash; Matthew Kahane	Jack Splash	3:52
8.	"The Thing About Love"	Perry	Linda Perry	3:49
9.	"Teenage Love Affair"	Lilly; Tom Nixon; Carl Hampton; Splash; Josephine Bridges; Kahane	Jack Splash	3:10
10.	"I Need You"	Batson; Lilly; Paul L. Green	Batson	5:09
11.	"Where Do We Go from Here"	Lilly; Brothers Jr.; Mary Frierson; Johnnie Frierson	Kerry "Krucial" Brothers	4:10
12.	"Prelude to a Kiss"			2:07
13.	"Tell You Something (Nana's Reprise)"	Brothers Jr.; Steve Mostyn; Green; Novel Stevenson; Ron Haney	Kerry "Krucial" Brothers	4:28
14.	"Sure Looks Good to Me"	Perry	Linda Perry	4:31
Total length:				55:58

=== Notes ===
- Lellow is Keys' alias used on track "So Simple".

== Charts ==
The Platinum Collection chart performance
Chart (2010)	Peak position
Irish Albums (IRMA)	51
Portuguese Albums (AFP)	18
Spanish Albums (PROMUSICAE)	95
Swiss Albums (Schweizer Hitparade)	82
UK Albums (OCC)	20

== Certifications ==
The Platinum Collection certifications
Region	Certification	Certified units/sales
Portugal (AFP)	3× Platinum	60,000^{^}
United Kingdom (BPI)	Silver	60,000^{*}
^{*} Sales figures based on certification alone.^{^} Shipments figures based on certification alone.

== Release history ==
The Platinum Collection release history
Region	Date	Format	Label(s)	Catalog	Ref.
Europe	May 4, 2010	3× CD	Jive; Sony Music	88697701872	
United States	May 10, 2010	3× CD	J	—	
