= Empire State of Mind (Part II) Broken Down =

2010 single by Alicia Keys

"Empire State of Mind (Part II)"

Single by Alicia Keys

from the album The Element of Freedom
- B-side: "We're Almost There"
- Released: February 22, 2010
- Studio: Oven Studios (New York, NY); Pie Studios (Glen Cove, NY)
- Genre: Pop; R&B
- Length: 3:36
- Label: J
- Songwriters: Alicia Keys; Alexander Shuckburgh; Shawn Carter; Jane't "J'nay" Sewell-Ulepić; Angela Hunte; Bert Keyes; Sylvia Robinson
- Producers: Al Shux; Alicia Keys

Alicia Keys singles chronology
"Put It in a Love Song" (2009)	"Empire State of Mind (Part II)" (2010)	"Un-Thinkable (I'm Ready)" (2010)

Licensed audio
- "Empire State of Mind (Part II) Broken Down" on YouTube

"Empire State of Mind (Part II) Broken Down" is a song by American singer Alicia Keys from her fourth studio album, The Element of Freedom (2009). It is an answer song to the Billboard Hot 100 number-one single "Empire State of Mind" performed by Jay-Z featuring Keys. Produced by Al Shux and Keys, the song gained international airplay and download sales although it was only officially released in the United Kingdom as the second single from The Element of Freedom.

Before its official release, "Empire State of Mind (Part II) Broken Down" had reached number four on the UK Singles Chart on downloads alone. The success of the song from a high volume of album downloads, led to it being announced as the second single from The Element of Freedom in the UK. The single was released on February 22, 2010. Keys and "Empire State of Mind (Part II) Broken Down" are featured on a 2011 HP Beats Commercial. The song also featured on the soundtrack of the film Sex and the City 2 (2010).

== Background ==
Following the release of "Empire State of Mind" in October 2009, Keys stated that she was planning to release a second version of the song featuring only her vocals, as a single the following month. The original takes of Keys' version, entitled "Empire State of Mind Part 2", included both Keys' vocals and a new rap verse from Jay-Z, but the final product did not include Jay-Z. Discussing the record, Keys claimed that it acts as a dichotomy of strength and vulnerability, commenting that "The music is really strong, and the drums are really aggressive, but my voice is vulnerable and delicate".

I definitely wanted to give my version of it and my vision of how I see New York and how it feels to me. I wanted to do it for my style—more broken down, more on piano, more voice and intimacy—so that's what I did. I imagined, 'If I was able to sing this whole song, how would I do it?' So I just sat down at my piano and I kind of broke it down and started singing about New York as I see it, and it turned out great.

— Keys on recording "Empire State of Mind (Part II) Broken Down"

== Critical reception ==
"Empire State of Mind (Part II) Broken Down" was generally well received by contemporary music critics in their reviews for The Element of Freedom. Allison Stewart of The Washington Post noted that the track, which is a pop ballad, had replaced "Empire State of Mind" sports team references and ruminations with "even milder and less controversial string of generalities", highlighting Keys' version's lyrics "If I could make it here/I could make it anywhere". Greg Kot of Hartford Courant wrote that Keys' version "retains the soaring vocal hook" but the track "loses its swagger" without Jay-Z.

== Chart performance ==
On December 20, 2009, due to high downloads of "Empire State of Mind (Part II) Broken Down", the song entered the UK Singles Chart at number fifty-two. As of February 14, 2010 it has reached a new peak of number four on downloads alone (her highest-charting solo single since "Fallin" reached number three in 2001). It became Keys' eighth top ten hit in the UK and second from The Element of Freedom. It ended up spending eight straight weeks within the top 10 in the country, the longest stay for any of her songs including the original version, Jay-Z's, "Empire State of Mind" in which she is featured. So far, it has spent 26 consecutive weeks within the top 40 as well as 52 weeks within the top 100, becoming Keys' most successful single ever. In December 2010 the song was announced as the thirteenth biggest selling single of the year in the UK, surpassing a number of chart-toppers and shaping as the biggest selling non-top-two single with 575,500 copies sold. In May 2011, the song would re-enter the top 100 by jumping from No. 189 to No. 93 in its 76th charting week. On January 21, 2010, the single entered the Irish Singles Chart at forty-six and reached eight. It also debuted on the Billboard R&B charts at number seventy-seven and peaked at number fifty-five on the Billboard Hot 100 without an official release. In May 2012, "Empire State of Mind (Part II)" ranked as the 79th biggest-selling single of the 21st century in the United Kingdom, as published by the Official Charts Company.

== Live performances ==
On November 29, Keys performed the song's chorus in a medley alongside "Doesn't Mean Anything" and "No One", on the sixth season of the United Kingdom television show, The X Factor. Keys performed the full version of the song on 4Music Favourites. Keys also performed the song on Saturday Night Live along with "Try Sleeping with a Broken Heart". Stephen Colbert and Keys also performed the song together on The Colbert Report with Colbert adding his own verses on December 15, 2009. For the 2010 Radio 1 Big Weekend, the track's chorus was changed from "New York..." to "North Wales..." and the new version waxes lyrical about all that the North Wales coast has to offer. Lyrics include; "Yes, today I travelled north from Harlech to the Menai Bridge. What a pretty drive, with so much to see it’s such a privilege." On June 28, 2011, Keys performed the song on Good Morning America. Keys also performed the song as the final number at the six-hour 12-12-12: The Concert for Sandy Relief on December 12, 2012.

There was no official music video shot for "Empire State of Mind (Part II) Broken Down". However, due to the success of the song, leading to it being released as a UK single, the 4Music Favourites performance was shown on music channels as the music video.

In 2022, Keys performed the song at the Platinum Party at the Palace.

== Track listings ==
UK Digital download
No.	Title	Length
1.	"Empire State of Mind (Part II) Broken Down"	3:36

German / Austrian / Swiss CD single and Digital download
No.	Title	Length
1.	"Empire State of Mind (Part II) Broken Down"	3:36
2.	"We're Almost There"	3:35

== Charts ==
=== Weekly charts ===
Chart (2009–2010)	Peak position
Australia (ARIA)	75
Austria (Ö3 Austria Top 40)	55
Belgium (Ultratip Bubbling Under Flanders)	18
Belgium (Ultratip Bubbling Under Wallonia)	20
Canada Hot 100 (Billboard)	40
Canada AC (Billboard)	19
Denmark (Tracklisten)	17
European Hot 100 Singles (Billboard)	14
Euro Digital Songs (Billboard)	4
Germany (GfK)	35
Ireland (IRMA)	8
Israel International Airplay (Media Forest)	10
Japan Hot 100 (Billboard)	65
Netherlands (Dutch Top 40)	8
Netherlands (Single Top 100)	6
Scottish Singles Sales (Official Charts)	4
Sweden (Sverigetopplistan)	59
Switzerland (Schweizer Hitparade)	19
UK Singles (Official Charts)	4
US Billboard Hot 100	55
US Adult Contemporary (Billboard)	18
US Hot R&B/Hip-Hop Songs (Billboard)	76

=== Year-end charts ===
Chart (2010)	Position
European Hot 100 Singles (Billboard)	56
Netherlands (Dutch Top 40)	58
Netherlands (Single Top 100)	35
Switzerland (Schweizer Hitparade)	75
UK Singles (OCC)	13
US Adult Contemporary (Billboard)	45

== Certifications ==
Region	Certification	Certified units/sales
Australia (ARIA)	2× Platinum	140,000^{‡}
Denmark (IFPI Danmark)	Platinum	30,000^{^}
Germany (BVMI)	3× Gold	450,000^{‡}
Italy (FIMI)	Gold	15,000^{*}
New Zealand (RMNZ)	Platinum	30,000^{‡}
Portugal (AFP)	Gold	10,000^{‡}
Spain (Promusicae)	Gold	30,000^{‡}
United Kingdom (BPI)	2× Platinum	1,200,000^{‡}
United States (RIAA)	Platinum	1,000,000^{‡}
^{*} Sales figures based on certification alone.^{^} Shipments figures based on certification alone.^{‡} Sales+streaming figures based on certification alone.

== Release history ==
Release dates and formats for "Empire State of Mind (Part II) Broken Down"
Region	Date	Format(s)	Label(s)	Ref.
United Kingdom	February 22, 2010	Digital download	RCA	
Germany	May 28, 2010	CD	Sony Music	

== See also ==
- List of UK top 10 singles in 2010
