= Put It in a Love Song =

2010 single by Alicia Keys featuring Beyoncé

Single by Alicia Keys featuring Beyoncé

from the album The Element of Freedom
- Released: January 19, 2010
- Studio: Oven (New York City); MSR (Montclair, New Jersey)
- Genre: Pop; R&B
- Length: 3:15
- Label: J
- Songwriters: Alicia Keys; Kaseem "Swizz Beatz" Dean
- Producers: Swizz Beatz; Alicia Keys

Alicia Keys singles chronology
"Try Sleeping with a Broken Heart" (2009)	"Put It in a Love Song" (2010)	"Empire State of Mind (Part II) Broken Down" (2010)

Beyoncé singles chronology
"Video Phone" (2009)	"Put It in a Love Song" (2010)	"Telephone" (2010)

Audio video
- "Put It in a Love Song" on YouTube

"Put It in a Love Song" is a song by American singer Alicia Keys. The song, written and produced by Keys and Swizz Beatz, features guest vocals by American singer Beyoncé. It was originally sent to radio on January 19, 2010, by J Records, as the fourth single from Keys' fourth studio album, The Element of Freedom (2009). However promotion for the song was halted so that Keys could release "Un-Thinkable (I'm Ready)" as her next single. "Put It in a Love Song" talks about a girl who just wants her lover to write her a song and prove to her he's worth her time.

Shortly after being sent to radio, the song peaked at number 23 on the US Rhythmic Songs chart and number 60 on the US Hot R&B/Hip-Hop Songs chart. The single charted at number seventy-one on the Canadian Hot 100. The song was more successful in Australia, where it peaked at number eighteen and was certified Platinum by the Australian Recording Industry Association (ARIA), for selling over 70,000 units. It also peaked at number twenty-four in New Zealand and at number thirty-two in Brazil.

An accompanying music video, directed by Melina Matsoukas, was shot in Rio de Janeiro, Brazil. Previews from the video portray Keys and Beyoncé dancing and singing around Rio, with locations including two favelas and the Sambódromo. However, the music video release was postponed several times due to "Un-Thinkable (I'm Ready)"'s release, and its release was eventually cancelled. "Put It in a Love Song" was performed live with Beyoncé for the first time on March 17, 2010, at New York City's Madison Square Garden.

== Background, composition and recording ==
"Put It in a Love Song"
A 19-second sample of "Put It in a Love Song" features Keys and Beyoncé singing.

"Put It in a Love Song" was written and produced by Keys and Swizz Beatz. In an interview, Keys mentioned Beyoncé and the song: "We had a lot of fun. It's nice that we just celebrate each others careers, that's what the song is about, coming together to empower each other. This song was meant for us at this time. We've become really good friends. We've been in the business about the same amount of time and both signed to Columbia Records together when we were 14. It was like a party in the studio, the energy was so high and chemistry was genuine". The song was included on the soundtrack of the Brazilian telenovela Ti Ti Ti (2010). The song officially impacted the radios on January 19, 2010. However, the full single release was postponed, so that "Un-Thinkable (I'm Ready)" could be pushed forward as the fourth single. Keys and Beyoncé recorded their respective parts in same studios with engineer Ann Mincieli. "Put It in a Love Song" was recorded in two studios at Oven Studios and MSR Studios in New York City.

"Put It in a Love Song" is a song that lasts for three minutes and fifteen seconds. The song is composed in the key of A♭ major and is set in time signature of common time, with a moderate tempo of 100 beats per minute. While reviewing The Element of Freedom, Greg Kot of Chicago Tribune compared the song with Beyoncé's song "Single Ladies (Put a Ring on It)" (2008) commenting that it had the same "sassiness on the tribal groove". A writer of The New York Times also compared the song with "Single Ladies" saying that it had a similar "thumping, step-dancing atmosphere". The song's lyrics are about a girl who just wants her lover to write her a song or a text message and prove to her he's worth her time. The song features a brief chat between Beyoncé and Keys at the beginning; "Hey yo, B!/What up, A?".

== Critical reception ==
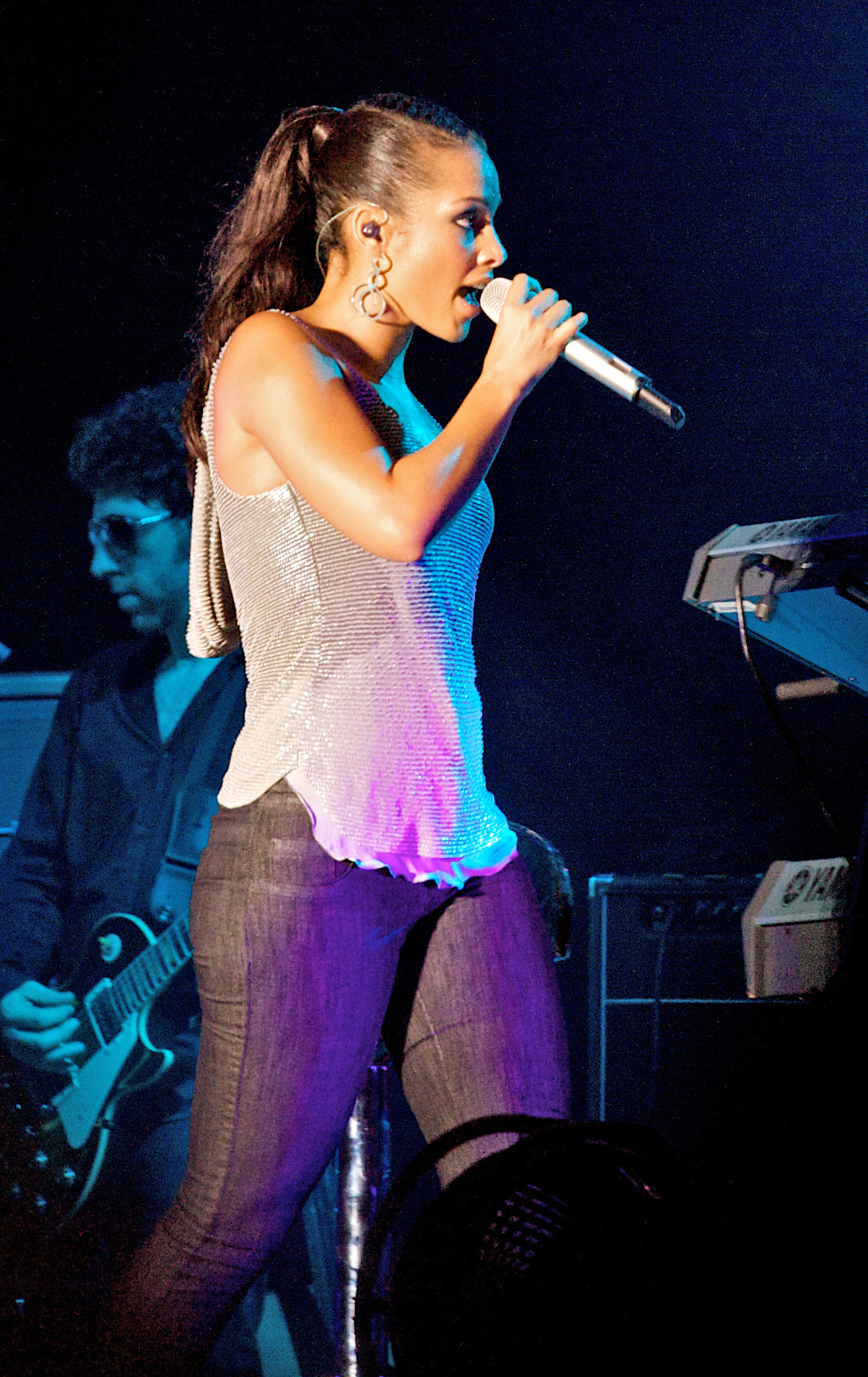
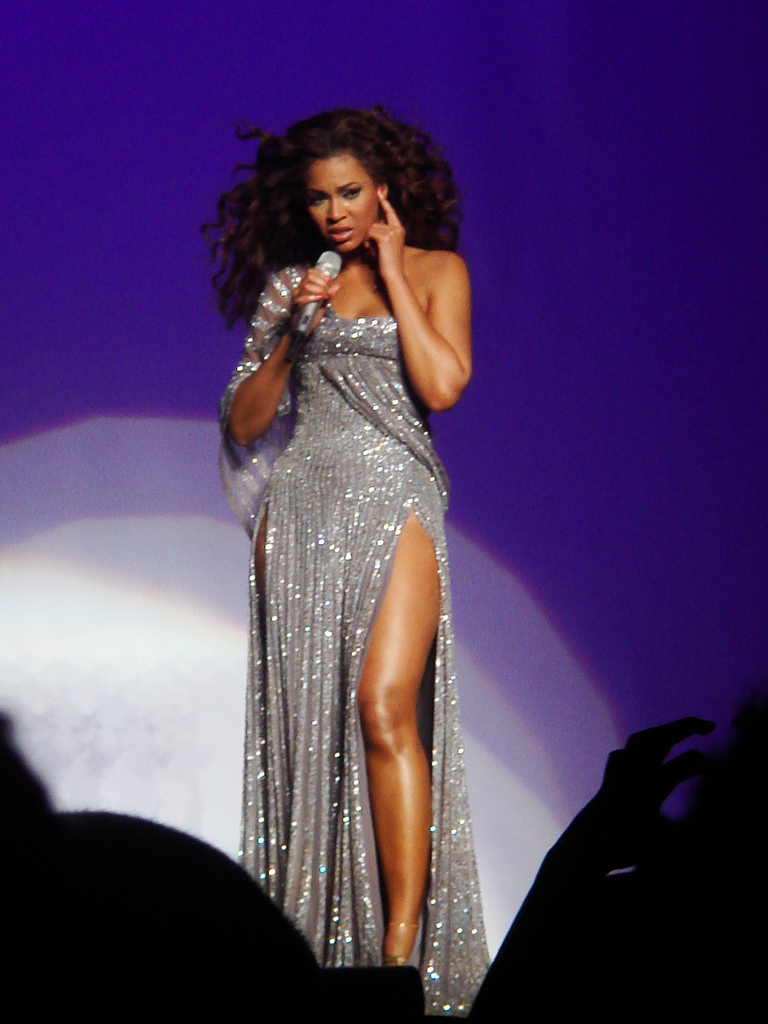
Keys (left) and Beyoncé (right) gathered to record their respective parts of music in the same studio in 2009. They met again in Rio de Janeiro for recording the music video.

The song received generally mixed to positive reviews from critics. Randy Lewis of Los Angeles Times gave the song a positive review stating "self-confidence is in full flower in 'Put It in a Love Song,' her effervescent duet with Beyoncé that has 'hit single' written all over it." Allison Stewart of The Washington Post stated "Keys also teams with Beyoncé, the glittery Diana Ross to Keys's [sic] super-serious poetry major, for the disc's best track, 'Put It in a Love Song.'[...] 'Love Song' is an oddly mechanical number that lurches from diva to diva but somehow doesn't fall over..." Andrew Burgess of MusicOMH called it one of the album's "standout moments", describing it as having "the Sasha Fierce brashness" and that "the always fantastic Beyoncé takes a notable backseat to Keys for a delightful and surprising change of pace". Stephen Thomas Erlewine of the website AllMusic chose "Put It in a Love Song" as one of the three best songs on The Element of Freedom and commented, "On The Element of Freedom, that elegance is so easy it borders on the sleepy, with Keys' understatement undercutting livelier numbers -- chief among them the bubbly Beyoncé duet 'Put It in a Love Song' -- so they play as ballads." Mikael Wood of Spin also chose the song as a highlight on the whole album. Gary Graff of Billboard magazine described the song as a "girl-power anthem". A writer of The New York Times felt that the song gives the album "bristle with a less regal impulse: flirting". The writer further commented that the song had a "quantitatively different energy, air-lifted from somewhere else". Nick Levine of Digital Spy said, "Beyoncé nearly manages to jolt Keys out of her midtempo comfort zone on 'Put In A Love Song', encouraging 'A' to show her sassy side over bootyshakin' Swiss Beatz rhythms." Ron Wynn of The City Paper noted that Keys matches Beyoncé "in force and attitude" on the song.

Jim Farber of Daily News commented that Beyoncé's "gymnastic style" during the song, overshadowed Keys' vocals. Leah Greenblatt of Entertainment Weekly gave the song a mixed review stating that the song "is fun, though not entirely in sync with the record's lush, midtempo vibe." USA Today negatively stated "The only one that seems out of place is the club anthem 'Put It in a Love Song', a collaboration with Beyoncé that's catchy but ultimately underwhelming, considering the talents involved." James Reed of The Boston Globe stated "in high vamping mode, has already made its way to radio, but it’s a slip of a song, coasting on its contagious chorus and delivering little more." While reviewing The Element of Freedom, Slant Magazine's Matthew Cole gave a negative review for the song saying, "The upbeat numbers, which ought to stand out given their infrequency, incline toward the forgettable, though the cutesy club-ready duet with Beyoncé, 'Put It in a Love Song,' is especially embarrassing—not only because the song is bad, but also because Beyoncé delivers what is, by a rather large margin, the best vocal performance of the album's second half." That was somehow echoed by Tyler Lewis of PopMatters who said, "In fact, when she shares a song with Beyoncé—the contemporary queen of pointless bombast—Keys' weakness in this arena is startingly apparent. Beyoncé completely steals the song away and Beyoncé fans will love it, even though it’s a terrible song."

== Chart performance ==
Due to the cancellation of the single, American radio pulled the song from their playlists, which resulted in the song failing to chart in the US on the Hot 100. However for the time the song was issued to radio airplay it did manage to peak at number sixty on the Hot R&B/Hip-Hop Songs chart. The single charted at number seventy-one on the Canadian Hot 100. The song was more successful in Australia, where it peaked at number eighteen and was certified Gold by the Australian Recording Industry Association (ARIA), for selling over 35,000 units. It also peaked at number twenty-four in New Zealand and at number thirty-two in Brazil.

== Promotion ==
=== Music video ===
The music video for "Put It in a Love Song" was directed by Melina Matsoukas, and was filmed at several locations on Rio de Janeiro, Brazil, on February 9, 2010. The original video was going to be shot in Egypt. However, Beyoncé was on tour in Brazil at the time the music video was going to be recorded, so both singers agreed about shooting the video in Rio. The music video locations included two favelas: the Dona Marta Hill and the Conceição Hill—the same place where Michael Jackson's video of "They Don't Care About Us" was shot. It was also shot in the center of Rio, and at the Sambódromo, with 80 members of the Grande Rio Samba School. After finishing the music video, Keys said:

Shooting 'Put It in a Love Song' in Rio, in Brazil, was very incredible, I feel that the energy of the city matches the energy of the song. It's sensual, it's exciting, it's so rich with color. I loved it. The people came out so heavy and so hard. I think it was exciting, especially to participate and experience it with them like that. Me and B have a good relationship. And to be able to have the chemistry we have and do it in a city that's so unique like that is unforgettable. The pictures speak a thousand words. So you saw the energy out there. It was great.

In April 2010, Keys told Rap-Up that the music video would not be out until after the video for the fourth single, "Un-Thinkable (I'm Ready)", is released. She said "it probably won't come out until closer to this Summer". In March 2011, a preview for the video surfaced online, ending with the lines "coming soon," but not mentioning an actual date. A representative for Keys later said, "presently, there are no plans to release the video," suggesting that video was created previously when the video was set to premier in 2010 but only just surfaced in May 2011. During an interview with Essence magazine in September 2012, Keys spoke about the video's cancellation, saying:

Sometimes with creative things [it] all comes together [...] and sometimes things almost come together and it's better to just leave it. So we love that song. We had a ball shooting the video. It just so happens that the whole thing, for some reason or another, didn't quite come together so we just decided to leave it. And that's what happened.

In a September 2020 interview for Stereogum, Keys stated she was trying to locate the video, and considered releasing it to fans as a treat. Referencing the collaboration with Beyoncé, Keys opined that long enough has passed since it was filmed, "at this point in our lives, since we've been able to do our thing and we all get that was a cool moment between us, we might both be at the place where we can say, 'Let's just throw it out there for fun'".

=== Live performances ===
Beyoncé joined Keys to perform the song live for the first time on March 17, 2010, at New York City's Madison Square Garden whilst Keys was playing a date from The Freedom Tour. The song was part of the set list only for the North American leg of the tour, sung only on selected dates.

== Charts ==
=== Weekly charts ===
Chart (2010)	Peak position
Australia (ARIA)	18
Brazil Hot 100 Airplay (Billboard)	32
Brazil Pop Songs (Billboard)	28
Canada Hot 100 (Billboard)	71
Canada Hot AC (Billboard)	39
Ireland (IRMA)	26
New Zealand (Recorded Music NZ)	24
South Korea International (Gaon)	3
US Bubbling Under Hot 100 (Billboard)	2
US Hot R&B/Hip-Hop Songs (Billboard)	60
US Rhythmic Airplay (Billboard)	23

=== Year-end charts ===
Chart (2010)	Position
South Korea Download (Gaon)	63

== Certifications and sales ==
Region	Certification	Certified units/sales
Australia (ARIA)	Platinum	70,000^{‡}
South Korea Digital	—	210,947
^{‡} Sales+streaming figures based on certification alone.

== Release history ==
Release dates and formats for "Put It in a Love Song"
Region	Date	Format(s)	Label(s)	Ref.
United States	January 19, 2010	Contemporary hit radio; rhythmic contemporary radio	J	
