= Try Sleeping with a Broken Heart =

2009 single by Alicia Keys

Single by Alicia Keys

from the album The Element of Freedom
- B-side: "Lover Man"
- Released: November 17, 2009
- Studio: Oven Studios (New York, New York); Conway Studios (Los Angeles, California)
- Genre: Downtempo
- Length: 4:09
- Label: J
- Songwriters: Alicia Keys; Jeff Bhasker; Patrick "Plain Pat" Reynolds
- Producer: Jeff Bhasker

Alicia Keys singles chronology
"Looking for Paradise" (2009)	"Try Sleeping with a Broken Heart" (2009)	"Put It in a Love Song" (2010)

Music video
- "Try Sleeping with a Broken Heart" on YouTube

"Try Sleeping with a Broken Heart" is a song by American recording artist Alicia Keys. It was released as the second single (third in the UK) from her fourth studio album, The Element of Freedom (2009). The ballad has been hailed by many music critics as the best track from the album. It marks a departure in Keys' artistic production. This single was Keys' third consecutive top 10 hit from The Element of Freedom in the United Kingdom. It was also the 99th most successful song of the year 2010 in the Billboard Hot 100. A remix of the song features American rapper, Maino.

== Composition and style ==
"Try Sleeping with a Broken Heart" is a downtempo song written by Keys, Patrick Reynolds and Jeff Bhasker in the key of F major (pesante) with a time signature in common time and a tempo of 83 beats per minute and combines elements of synths and drums to create a retro 1980s power ballad feel. The vocal range spans from E_{3} to D_{5}. The basic chord progression of the song is B_{♭}, C, and F.

In the lyrics, the narrator vows to move on from a failed relationship, but struggles to overcome constant thoughts of her lover.

== Chart performance ==
The song premiered on October 29, 2009, and was released to the iTunes Store on November 17, 2009. The single debuted on the Billboard Hot 100 at number 58, the highest after "No One" and "Doesn't Mean Anything". It has spent twenty weeks on the chart, peaking at number 27. On the Hot R&B/Hip-Hop Songs, the song became Keys' thirteenth top ten hit, peaking at number 2 and spending ten weeks in the top ten. The song also debuted at No. 2 on the Norwegian Charts and became her highest charting single there so far. On January 31, 2010 the single entered the UK Singles Chart at number 71 based on downloads alone, but dropped out the following week. Upon being confirmed as the third UK single, the single re-entered the chart on April 26, 2010 at number 63. On May 23, 2010 it climbed to a new peak of number 13. Upon physical release, the single remained at its peak of number 13. The success of the song propelled the album back in the top 10 of the UK Albums Chart, twenty-three weeks after its original release. Following a performance on Britain's Got Talent on 1 June 2010, the single climbed into the Top 10 on 6 June 2010 at number 7, marking the third consecutive Top 10 single from The Element of Freedom as well as Keys' ninth Top 10 single overall. On March 19, 2010, the song was released as the album's second single in Germany and later peaked at number 33.

== Critical reception ==
The song received widespread critical acclaim from music critics; many compared it to a Prince composition. Entertainment Weekly called it "insidiously, almost obscenely hooky: a slithering riff on early-'80s Prince with a monster synth line." Rob Sheffield of Rolling Stone stated that "The superb Prince hommages, "Try Sleeping With a Broken Heart" and "This Bed," are experiments that pay off big, submerging Keys' pipes in unabashed 1980s synth cheese." Andrew Burgess of MusicOMH referred to it as a "fever dream", citing it as a "standout moment" while Clover Hopes of Vibe magazine praised the song as "instantly timeless" and described it as a "gorgeous drum-powered exercise in vocal discipline (with its whispered huffs and puffs) that deals with the loss of a man's mere presence". Dan Weiss of Popmatters, gave the song a seven out of ten rating and thought that ""Sleeping" is proof that Keys can find the warmth inside of a song even when she pushes away from the piano and the arrangement drifts into something colder and more abstract."

Randy Lewis of the LA Times was highly impressed with the track and wrote: "In "Try Sleeping With a Broken Heart," she's crafted an intriguing refrain: "I'm gonna find a way to make it without you . . .," admitting she's still searching for a full-fledged sense of security in whatever newfound freedom she's come into. But then she extends the thought with the kicker word ". . . tonight." Is she taking the one-day-at-a-time approach of a 12-step program for romantic addiction? Is it merely the application of an emotional band-aid? Or might she be asserting that the path to true independence always begins right here, right now? It's never entirely clear, and the ambiguity makes the song that much richer.". PopJustice said that the song is the album's "secret weapon" and called it "amazing", adding that it's "a head-explodingly brilliant, timeless 'n' modern R&B ballad". Slant magazine said that "The best moments on Freedom come early, with the clear standout being "Try Sleeping with a Broken Heart." There, some retro synth work lends a funky backdrop for Keys's breathy vamping, alternating disco-diva choruses with Prince-worthy verses". Robert Copsey of Digital Spy gave the song four out of five stars, branding it as one of the stand out tracks from the album. He also stated that the verses were good because of Keys's breathy vocals with military-style drumming in the background, he felt the chorus was full of "palpable emotion". Overall, he branded the song as an "effortless and timeless power ballad".

== Music video ==
Keys filmed the video on October 30 and October 31, 2009, in Brooklyn. The music video premiered on November 16, 2009. The video begins with the words, "There are those among us who are blessed with the power to save what is loved by another. But powerless to use this blessing for love themselves". The beat of the music then starts, showing what appears to be a purple sea at first, however is then shown to be Keys' bed sheets. Keys is seen to be leaning on her bed, and then starts to sing. On the bed, there is a photo frame, which is turned down. Keys is seen to have a coloured tattoo on her back, representing the theme of the album, "The Element of Freedom". Keys is then seen to exit her building, wearing a studded leather jacket and sunglasses. Scenes are also shown of Keys singing the song at the bottom of the stairway. As she is walking down the road, various shots of the city are shown, including buildings with graffiti, and a basketball hoop etc. She then spots a dog having just collided with a car in the road, with a young girl crouching down by its side crying. Keys walks over and touches the dog, using her superpowers to bring life back to the dog and save it, bringing happiness to the young girl. Throughout this part of the video, a hooded figure is seen to be watching Keys, which she is aware of. Scenes are then shown of her driving her BMW motorcycle with a purple laser beam increasing the speed of the bike. She then parks her bike in a warehouse, and uses her superpowers to fly up to some skylights, where she carries on to sing the song. Another scene is also shown of Keys playing the piano in the warehouse. Keys is then seen to appear back in the alley way, returning to her bike, however is stopped by the hooded figure, who turns out to be her lover. She smiles at him, and reaches her hand out towards his face. However, she is seen draining his face of energy and life with her power, and so has to pull her hand back, showing she is unable to touch her lover without draining him of his life. She then gets on her bike, leaving him in the warehouse alone. The video then moves back to the original scene of Keys sitting on her bed, looking at the photograph of her lover, with a teardrop falling down the face onto the picture, turning it black. The video ends with Keys leaning back onto her bed, showing her purple bedsheets rippling like at the start of the video. The video was directed by Los Angeles-based Syndrome Studio.

== Live performances ==
Keys performed the song at New York University’s Skirball Center for Pepsi Music. Keys also performed it on Dancing With The Stars on November 17, 2009. She also performed the song on Saturday Night Live on January 9, 2010; as well as at the 2009 American Music Awards. On the 22nd of January, Keys also performed "Try Sleeping with a Broken Heart" on Friday Night With Jonathan Ross. She also performed it at the 2010 NBA All-Star Game at Cowboys Stadium in Arlington, Texas, on February 14, 2010. On March 5, 2010, Keys performed the song on The Oprah Winfrey Show. Keys also performed the song on the second semi-final night of Britain's Got Talent on June 1, 2010. The song has been included on Keys Freedom Tour, Set the World on Fire Tour and Alicia + Keys World Tour.

== Track listings ==
- Digital download and European CD single
1. "Try Sleeping with a Broken Heart" – 4:09
2. "Lover Man" – 3:16
- Digital EP
1. "Try Sleeping with a Broken Heart" – 4:09
2. "Lover Man" – 3:16
3. "Try Sleeping with a Broken Heart" (music video)
- Polish promotional CD single
1. "Try Sleeping with a Broken Heart" (radio edit) – 3:52
2. "Try Sleeping with a Broken Heart" (radio ID)
3. "Wishing Happy New Year" (radio ID)
4. "Wishing Happy Holidays" (radio ID)

== Charts ==
=== Weekly charts ===
Chart (2009–2010)	Peak position
Austria (Ö3 Austria Top 40)	57
Belgium (Ultratip Bubbling Under Flanders)	12
Belgium (Ultratip Bubbling Under Wallonia)	8
Canada Hot 100 (Billboard)	37
Denmark (Tracklisten)	5
Euro Digital Songs (Billboard)	11
Germany (GfK)	33
Ireland (IRMA)	22
Japan Hot 100 (Billboard)	61
Mexico Ingles Airplay (Billboard)	21
Netherlands (Dutch Top 40)	21
New Zealand (Recorded Music NZ)	12
Norway (VG-lista)	2
Scottish Singles Sales (Official Charts)	12
Slovakia Airplay (ČNS IFPI)	10
Sweden (Sverigetopplistan)	10
Switzerland (Schweizer Hitparade)	21
UK Singles (Official Charts)	7
US Billboard Hot 100	27
US Adult R&B Songs (Billboard)	2
US Hot R&B/Hip-Hop Songs (Billboard)	2
US Rhythmic Airplay (Billboard)	29

=== Year-end charts ===
Chart (2010)	Position
Brazil (Crowley)	83
Denmark (Tracklisten)	38
Sweden (Sverigetopplistan)	64
UK Singles (Official Charts Company)	63
US Adult R&B Songs (Billboard)	14
US Billboard Hot 100	99
US Hot R&B/Hip-Hop Songs (Billboard)	20

== Certifications ==
Region	Certification	Certified units/sales
Canada (Music Canada)	Gold	20,000^{*}
Denmark (IFPI Danmark)	Gold	15,000^{^}
United Kingdom (BPI)	Platinum	600,000^{‡}
United States (RIAA)	Platinum	1,000,000^{‡}
^{*} Sales figures based on certification alone.^{^} Shipments figures based on certification alone.^{‡} Sales+streaming figures based on certification alone.

== Release history ==
Release dates and formats for "Try Sleeping with a Broken Heart"
Region	Date	Format(s)	Label(s)	Ref.
United States	November 17, 2009	Rhythmic contemporary radio	J	
United States	March 12, 2010	Digital download	J	
Germany	March 19, 2010	CD	Sony Music	
United Kingdom	May 24, 2010	Digital download	RCA	
