= Un-Thinkable (I'm Ready) =

Single by Alicia Keys

from the album The Element of Freedom
- A-side: "Wait Til You See My Smile"
- Released: March 15, 2010
- Recorded: 2009
- Studio: Oven Studios (New York City, NY)
- Genre: R&B; downtempo
- Length: 4:09
- Label: J
- Songwriters: Alicia Keys; Aubrey Graham; Kerry Brothers Jr.; Noah "40" Shebib
- Producers: Alicia Keys; Kerry Brothers Jr.; Noah "40" Shebib

Alicia Keys singles chronology
"Empire State of Mind (Part II) Broken Down" (2010)	"Un-Thinkable (I'm Ready)" (2010)	"Wait Til You See My Smile" (2010)

Music video
- "Un-Thinkable (I'm Ready)" on YouTube

"Un-Thinkable (I'm Ready)" is a song by American singer-songwriter Alicia Keys from her fourth studio album The Element of Freedom (2009), that features uncredited background vocals from Canadian rapper Drake, although he is credited on the official remix of the song. It was initially scheduled to be the fifth single, but it was released as the fourth single. It was her first single to reach number one on the R&B chart in the United States since 2007's "Like You'll Never See Me Again". "Un-Thinkable (I'm Ready)" spent twelve consecutive weeks atop the Billboard Hot R&B/Hip Hop Songs, becoming the longest-running number-one single of 2010. The song topped the Billboard Adult R&B Songs, and reached number twenty-one on the Billboard Hot 100.

== Composition ==
"Un-thinkable (I'm Ready)"
Alicia Keys's "Un-thinkable (I'm Ready)" from The Element of Freedom

"Un-Thinkable (I'm Ready)" is a down-tempo R&B song written by Alicia Keys, Aubrey Graham, Kerry Brothers Jr., and Noah "40" Shebib in the key of B minor.

== Critical reception ==
Mariel Concepcion from Billboard magazine called the song the album's "standout track". Concepcion said that Keys "goes from entertaining puppy love to confessing deeper emotions", adding that she "sings nervously over extended piano strokes" and "has never sounded quite as vulnerable and exposed as she does here." Ashante Infantry from Toronto Star also picked the song as the album's top track saying "Keys is as sexy as she's ever been on the sultry" track. Allison Stewart from The Washington Post said that Drake's appearance on the song is pointless, "filling some sort of unspoken requirement that every female R&B album contain an appearance by at least one cool-but-unthreatening hip-hop star." Molly Lambert of Pitchfork ranked the song as the 64th best song of the year, writing: "Keys always puts out one perfect song per album. It's an instant babymaking classic. Skittering beats, trembling synths, deep piano chord progressions, and floating drums. It sounds like it was recorded in a downtempo underwater sex chamber or inside a neon motel sign ... It is the eye of the quiet storm." In February 2025, Billboard ranked the song at number twenty-one on their list of The Top 50 R&B Love Songs of All Time. In August 2025, the song was ranked at number 39 on Billboard's list of Top R&B/Rap Songs of the 21st Century.

== Chart performance ==
In the chart week dated May 22, 2010, "Un-Thinkable (I'm Ready)" topped the U.S. Hot R&B/Hip Hop Songs chart, having already been present on the chart for eighteen weeks. It remained at the top of the summit for twelve consecutive weeks this becoming her longest running Hot R&B/Hip-Hop Songs chart leader, beating her previous best of ten weeks with "No One" (2007). The single was also broke another R&B chart record, this time on the Billboard Adult R&B Songs chart. On June 3, "Un-Thinkable (I'm Ready)" topped the Adult R&B chart, giving Keys her ninth leader on this chart and extended her lead ahead of Toni Braxton, Whitney Houston, Brian McKnight and Luther Vandross, all of whom rank in second place with six chart leaders each. The single also reached number twenty-one on the Billboard Hot 100. To date the song's success on both the Hot 100 and R&B charts make "Un-Thinkable (I'm Ready)" the most successful single from The Element of Freedom. At the end of 2010, following its twelve-week run leading the Hot R&B/Hip-Hop chart, "Un-Thinkable (I'm Ready)" was named the number-one R&B/Hip-Hop song of the year on the end of year charts.

== Remix ==
The official remix of the song features a verse by Canadian rapper Drake was released on iTunes on May 28, 2010. Rappers Lloyd Banks and Joe Budden released unofficial remixes to the song.

== Music video ==
Keys filmed the music video in Los Angeles with director Jake Nava. Although Drake appears on background vocals, Keys has stated that he does not appear in the video because she said "that would be too obvious". The video tackles issues of interracial dating and as Keys told Rap Up magazine, "The promo clip will highlight the past and present stigmas surrounding the subject." Additionally Chad Michael Murray, best known for playing Lucas Scott in One Tree Hill, plays Keys' love interest. One of the scenes depicts a blood-stained Murray fighting a group of men. The video made its world premiere on May 12, 2010, on Vevo and on BET's 106 & Park. The video features Keys in different decades, from the 1950s to the present. The video was awarded Outstanding Music Video at the 42nd NAACP Awards.

== Track listings and formats ==
- Digital download
1. "Un-Thinkable (I'm Ready)" – 4:09
- Digital download (remix)
1. "Un-Thinkable (I'm Ready)" (Remix) (featuring Drake) – 4:42

== Personnel ==
- Alicia Keys – piano, producer, Moog synthesizer, vocals
- Carlos Alomar – electric guitar
- Kerry Brothers – drum programming, producer
- Drake – background vocals
- Noah "40" Shebib – drum programming, keyboard, producer, recording engineer
- Ann Mincieli – recording engineer
- Miki Tsutsumi – assistant engineer
- Val Brathwaite – assistant engineer
- Manny Marroquin – mixing
- Erik Madrid – mix assistant

== Charts ==
=== Weekly charts ===
Chart (2010)	Peak position
South Korea International (Gaon)	19
US Billboard Hot 100	21
US Adult R&B Songs (Billboard)	1
US Hot R&B/Hip-Hop Songs (Billboard)	1
US Rhythmic Airplay (Billboard)	10

Chart (2026)	Peak position
Netherlands (Single Tip)	14
South Africa (Billboard)	16

=== Year-end charts ===
Chart (2010)	Position
US Billboard Hot 100	78
US Adult R&B Songs (Billboard)	4
US Hot R&B/Hip-Hop Songs (Billboard)	1

=== Decade-end charts ===
Chart (2010–2019)	Position
US Hot R&B/Hip-Hop Songs (Billboard)	14

== Certifications ==
Region	Certification	Certified units/sales
New Zealand (RMNZ)	Platinum	30,000^{‡}
United Kingdom (BPI)	Silver	200,000^{‡}
United Kingdom (BPI) Remix version	Silver	200,000^{‡}
United States (RIAA)	4× Platinum	4,000,000^{‡}
^{‡} Sales+streaming figures based on certification alone.

== Release history ==
Release dates and formats for "Un-Thinkable (I'm Ready)"
Region	Date	Version(s)	Format(s)	Label(s)	Ref.
United States	March 15, 2010	Original	Urban contemporary radio	J	
United States	March 30, 2010	Original	Urban adult contemporary radio	J	
United States	April 13, 2010	Original	Rhythmic contemporary radio	J	
United States	May 28, 2010	Remix	Digital download	J	

== See also ==
- List of R&B number-one singles of 2010 (U.S.)
