= Wait Til You See My Smile =

Single by Alicia Keys

from the album The Element of Freedom
- B-side: "Un-thinkable (I'm Ready)" (Remix)
- Released: December 13, 2010
- Studio: Oven Studios (New York, NY); Conway Recording Studios (Los Angeles, CA)
- Genre: Soul; pop
- Length: 4:01
- Label: J
- Songwriters: Alicia Keys; Jeff Bhasker; Kasseem Dean
- Producers: Alicia Keys; Jeff Bhasker

Alicia Keys singles chronology
"Un-Thinkable (I'm Ready)" (2010)	"Wait Til You See My Smile" (2010)	"International Party" (2011)

Licensed audio
- "Wait Til You See My Smile" on YouTube

"Wait Til You See My Smile" is a song performed by American recording artist Alicia Keys. It was released as the sixth single from her fourth studio album, The Element of Freedom (2009). The ballad was released on December 13, 2010. The Keys and "Wait Till You See My Smile" featured on the new Samsung DualView Commercial. The song was featured on the 13th episode of the sixth season of Grey's Anatomy.

== Background ==
Following the birth of Keys' first child on October 16, 2010, Keys revealed that "Wait 'Til You See My Smile" would be released as the next single in the UK on November 28, 2010. However this was since pushed back to December 13, 2010. The single features "Un-Thinkable (I'm Ready)" (Remix featuring Drake) as its b-side.

== Critical reception ==
"Wait Til You See My Smile" received a mostly positive reception from music critics. In her review of The Element of Freedom in The Scotsman, Fiona Shepherd stated that "The vintage keyboards also come out for Wait Til You See My Smile, which sounds like it's about to break into Supertramp's Dreamer or build up to some U2/Coldplay-style stadium-friendly crescendo of euphoria. The crescendo never comes, but it is still a robust example of Keys' musical diversity – she's not one for staying in the soul/R&B box. Slant Magazine's Matthew Cole expressed that "A similar aesthetic [to "Try Sleeping with a Broken Heart"] extends to follow-up track, "Wait Til You See My Smile," where Keys jumps ably between a sultry lower register and an artfully strained high while synths and strings pile up to "Purple Rain" proportions." Leah Greenblatt of Entertainment Weekly simply reviewed the song as being "pure honeyed uplift". Robert Christgau claimed that Keys "goes for melismatic pain whenever she sees an opening. But this is formal ploy merely, a diva-by-default's privilege. Her true self comes out in the half-heartedly relentless "Wait Til You See My Smile," a stab at the chin-up franchise once claimed by a young Mariah Carey".

== Music video ==
To promote "Wait Til You See My Smile", RCA worked in collaboration with Genero.tv on a competition where fans and Genero's community of 12,000 film makers (which has since grown to 35,000) were given the opportunity to create their own music video for the single. The competition ran over 6 weeks and after this period, 6 of the best videos were chosen by the genero.tv team, the genero fanbase and RCA. After this, Keys chose the final video. Once selected, the video was promoted across Alicia's official channels as the video supporting the UK release. The winning video was shot by Scott Orr from New Zealand. Keys' official site stated that "his originality and creativity that landed him the winning spot in the 'Wait Til you see My Smile’ video competition. His idea about humans as animals and embracing our freedom is incredible and heartfelt." Keys does not appear in the video.

== Track listing ==
- UK / Ireland Digital download
1. "Wait Til You See My Smile" (Radio Edit) – 3:00
2. "Un-thinkable (I'm Ready)" (Remix) (featuring Drake) – 4:42

== Release history ==
Country	Date	Format	Label
United Kingdom	December 13, 2010	Digital download	RCA Records
