= The Element of Freedom =

- Standard edition cover (Note: Deluxe edition cover is a closer version of the standard edition one with a different background. Empire Edition cover is a black-and-white, purple-tinged version of the deluxe edition one.)

Studio album by Alicia Keys
- Released: December 11, 2009
- Recorded: May–September 2009
- Studios: Germano (Note: Tracks 6, 11 and 12); Manhattan Sound Recordings (Note: Track 10); Oven (Note: All tracks); Strawberrybee (Note: Track 8) (New York City); Conway (Note: Tracks 3–5 and 9)
- Genres: R&B; pop; soul
- Length: 53:04
- Label: J
- Producers: Alicia Keys; Jeff Bhasker; Kerry Brothers Jr.; Toby Gad; Noah "40" Shebib; Al Shux; Swizz Beatz

Alicia Keys chronology
Remixed (2008)	The Element of Freedom (2009)	The Platinum Collection (2010)

Singles from The Element of Freedom
- 1. "Doesn't Mean Anything" Released: September 22, 2009; 2. "Try Sleeping with a Broken Heart" Released: November 17, 2009; 3. "Put It in a Love Song" Released: January 19, 2010; 4. "Empire State of Mind (Part II) Broken Down" Released: February 22, 2010; 5. "Un-Thinkable (I'm Ready)" Released: May 28, 2010; 6. "Wait Til You See My Smile" Released: December 13, 2010

The Element of Freedom is the fourth studio album by American singer and songwriter Alicia Keys, released on December 11, 2009, by J Records. Recording sessions for the album took place during May to September 2009 at the Oven Studios in Long Island, New York. Production was primarily handled by Keys, Kerry Brothers Jr., and Jeff Bhasker. Departing from the classicist soul music of Keys' previous albums, The Element of Freedom has a mid-tempo, low-key sound and features mostly love songs.

Upon its release, the album received generally positive reviews from music critics, who complimented its low-key style, cohesiveness, and Keys' singing, while some were ambivalent towards the lyrics. The album debuted at number two on the US Billboard 200 chart, selling 417,000 copies in its first week. It was certified platinum by the Recording Industry Association of America (RIAA) within its first month of release (later being certified double platinum) and produced six singles. By August 2012, The Element of Freedom had sold over four million copies worldwide.

== Recording and production ==
It feels emotional and vulnerable but there's also a kind of freedom in it. I can't quite find a better word than freedom to really describe it. Even though every song has touches of different textures and sounds, the overall [sense of] freedom is the thing that grounds it. It's definitely the theme of where I am in my life.

— Alicia Keys, Billboard.

After recording her third studio album, As I Am (2007), Keys began to "find the way to totally be myself and what that meant, figuring out what choices I wanted to make and not make in order to truly honor myself". She began working on the album in May 2009; Keys and her Audio engineer bought several vintage keyboards during this time, describing the Moog as her "special best friend". Recording took place at Keys' Oven Studios in Long Island, New York. Keys expressed that she "didn't know what to do" when she began working on the album, but knew to do it. After exhausting herself, she stated that she "finally found the key, and that is to allow yourself to be free". Keys explained that the album dealt with overcoming depression, going on to say: "I found more freedom. Before, I thought I could only show the strong side of me. Now there’s a mixture of strong and delicate. A new sound, a new emotion. That’s a lot of who I am right now". Recording for the album was completed between August and September 2009, and Keys described that she "love[d] melody so much", but approached the album with a "free zone". The album includes production by Kerry "Krucial" Brothers, Jeff Bhasker, Noah "40" Shebib and Swizz Beatz.

MTV News reported that Keys and rapper Jay-Z recorded "Empire State of Mind Part 2", a second version of "Empire State of Mind" from Jay-Z's album The Blueprint 3. The final product, titled "Empire State of Mind (Part II) Broken Down", did not feature Jay-Z. In mid-November 2009, Brothers revealed on Twitter that Canadian recording artist Drake would be featured on the album. Drake described the studio session with Keys as "one of the best studio experiences of my life", explaining that "I came in there and instead of being like, 'Here's the beat, get to work,' she was just like, 'Play me your favorite songs and lets battle'... It's almost like the transition from [listening to] great music to making a song — like, no one even noticed it, because she started playing the keys and I just started writing the melodies." Keys stated that due to the album being pushed back, she was able to record "How It Feels to Fly", as well as to work with Drake and Beyoncé, which Keys described as "the most exciting collaborations of my career yet". Keys revealed to The Times that in the period she was recording the album, she listened to artists such as Genesis, Tears for Fears, Fleetwood Mac and The Police. In an interview with Billboard, she stated that she "eliminated all of the boundaries and all the limitations, so that you can feel your freedom and express your freedom in every way you possibly can".

== Music and lyrics ==
"Un-Thinkable (I'm Ready)"
The song features a down-tempo, quiet storm style with skittering beats, trembling synths, deep piano chord progressions, and light drums.

Music writers have noted Keys' transition from 1960s and 1970s R&B and soul to 1980s and 1990s pop-oriented sound with the album. Ben Ratliff of The New York Times described most of the album's songs as "professionals ... slow, clean songs with semi-classical acoustic piano, soft-pop chord changes and simple, prominent hip-hop beats". The Washington Post's Allison Stewart wrote that the album "relies unusually heavily upon mid-tempo, carefully layered lovesick ballads".

Keys received some comparisons to musician Prince. Slant Magazine's Matthew Cole wrote that "some retro synth work lends a funky backdrop" to Keys' "breathy vamping, alternating disco-diva choruses with Prince-worthy verses". Stephen Thomas Erlewine of AllMusic pointed out the "always apparent" influence of Prince, as Keys "swapped the retro-soul instrumentation of her earliest music for electronics". He identified the album as "clean, small-scale collection of ballads and Prince-inspired pop". Several writers also noted that the album's tenth track, "Put It in a Love Song", distinguishes itself from the rest of the album, being described as having "dreamy, sun-dazed production" and is "quantitatively different energy".

Keys described The Element of Freedom as diverse, but noted that there is a "balance". She explained that "one side is strong and one side is vulnerable", which she pointed to as the theme of the album. The album has a "strong, edgy feel", but is also "intimate and vulnerable and delicate". While on BET's 106 & Park, she described the album: "The way that the songs progress [on the album] are gonna take you on a natural high. I just want you to feel a sense of freedom, I want you to feel out-of-the-box, feel inspired, You're definitely going to be taken on a trip, I know you're going to be shocked, you're going to hear things that you probably didn't think that I would sound like. It's a journey." The album's Empire Edition includes a cover of Michael Jackson's 1975 song "We're Almost There" on its bonus disc, alongside the song "Lover Man" and live versions of Keys' singles from previous albums.

== Release and promotion ==
On September 14, 2009, the day after the 2009 MTV Video Music Awards, Keys posted the audio to the album's lead single on her YouTube channel. In October, she performed the song on Live with Regis and Kelly. On October 21, Keys held "The Element of Freedom Lecture & Performance Series" at the New York University, free for students at the Tisch School of the Arts. Among the songs she performed included the then-new "Try Sleeping with a Broken Heart". The song, produced by Keys and Jeff Bhasker, was released as the second single from the album. The music video premiered on November 16. Keys performed a medley of "Empire State of Mind", "Doesn't Mean Anything" and "No One" on the sixth season of The X Factor on November 29. Keys performed a benefit concert at the Nokia Theater in New York City on December 1, where all the proceeds went to the Keep a Child Alive program. The concert—held on World AIDS Day—was streamed live via YouTube. As part of the promotional drive for the album, she performed at the Cayman Islands Jazz Festival on December 5, the final night of the three-day festival which would be broadcast on BET. The Element of Freedom was originally scheduled to be released that day, to correspond with World AIDS Day, but was pushed back to December 15 for additional recording. According to the senior vice president of urban marketing for J Records, Keys "had a couple of more things in the oven and she wants this to be right [...] So we gave her the additional time she needed." Keys pointed out that she felt the album was being rushed for no reason. In an interview with Scottish newspaper The Scotsman, she stated that it "seems unfair to have to rush these songs that were still coming and not allow them to be the best songs they could be. It was just two weeks' difference, but it made for an even better record". On December 16, BET's 106 & Park hosted a two-hour special titled 106 & Keys, which consisted of a countdown of Keys' videos and a live performance.

A week prior to its release, Keys streamed The Element of Freedom in its entirety on the peer-to-peer music streaming service Spotify, as well as social networking website Facebook through a Facebook Platform; she became the first major recording artist in Facebook's history to do so. The Element of Freedom was released in the United States on December 15, having been released internationally four days earlier. Its deluxe edition with two bonus tracks and a bonus DVD was released simultaneously with the standard edition; in the United States, both editions were accompanied by the double-disc Empire Edition. The "Alicia Keys & Friends" concert took place on January 7, 2010, at the Apollo Theater in New York City. In addition to her performances, Keys introduced new artists who also performed during the event. She also performed on Saturday Night Live on January 9, followed by an AOL Music Sessions premiere on January 14. On February 14, Keys performed with recording artists Usher and Shakira at the 2010 NBA All-Star Game during halftime. At the show, Keys performed "No One" from her 2007 album As I Am. She also performed "Empire State of Mind" as well "Try Sleeping with a Broken Heart". On March 3, Keys embarked on the North American leg of the Freedom Tour at the Allstate Arena in Rosemont, Illinois. The European leg of the tour started in late April. Keys performed at the Essence Music Festival taking place July 2–4, 2010. In April, Keys announced a reissue of the album, which ultimately never materialized.

=== Singles ===
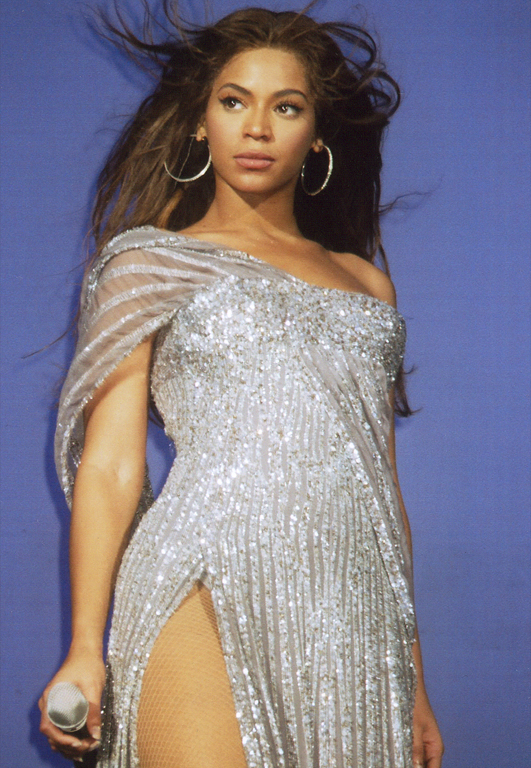
Beyoncé performs on the single "Put It in a Love Song"

Keys released "Doesn't Mean Anything" as the lead single from The Element of Freedom on September 22, 2009. Critics compared it to her previous singles, "No One", "Superwoman" and "If I Ain't Got You". In Europe, the song reached the top five in Switzerland and top ten in the United Kingdom. It peaked at number 14 on the US R&B/Hip-Hop Songs chart but only managed to reach number 60 on the Billboard Hot 100.

On November 17, 2009, Keys released the second single "Try Sleeping with a Broken Heart". It received critical acclaim as the album's standout moment for its timeless synths and throwbacks to the 1980s. The song was more successful than "Doesn't Mean Anything", reaching number two in Norway and five in Denmark, as well as number 27 on the Billboard Hot 100 and number two on the Hot R&B/Hip-Hop Songs. It was later released in the United Kingdom as the album's third single, where it would go on to peak at number seven.

"Put It in a Love Song", featuring Beyoncé, was released as the third single from the album on January 19, 2010. It did best in Australia, where it peaked at number 18 and was certified gold by the Australian Recording Industry Association (ARIA). However, it received only a limited release in the United States. Its accompanying music video was due to be released in March 2010 but was canceled so "Un-Thinkable (I'm Ready)" could be pushed forward as a single instead. Despite this, "Put It in a Love Song" peaked at number 60 on the Hot R&B/Hip-Hop Songs.

Following the album's release, Keys' version of "Empire State of Mind" charted due to digital sales. It was released as an international single in February 2010, being the best charting single from the album in several territories. It peaked at number four in the UK, six in the Netherlands, and number eight in Ireland. It also peaked at number 55 on the Billboard Hot 100.

Meanwhile, in the United States, "Un-Thinkable (I'm Ready)" began to make its impact starting April 13. It was the most successful single from the album in the US, topping the Hot R&B/Hip-Hop Songs for 12 consecutive weeks, as well as reaching number 21 on the Billboard Hot 100. A remix featuring Drake was released on May 28.

Following the birth of her first child on October 16, Keys revealed that "Wait Til You See My Smile" would be released as the next single in the UK on November 28. However, it got pushed back to December 12. The single featured the aforementioned remix of "Un-Thinkable (I'm Ready)" as the B-side. To promote the single, 12,000 filmmakers were invited over a period of six weeks to create a music video for the song. Keys then selected one of the six short-listed videos to be released as the song's official music video via YouTube and music television channels.

== Critical reception ==
Professional ratings
Aggregate scores
Source	Rating
Metacritic	67/100
Review scores
Source	Rating
AllMusic	3.5/5 stars
Chicago Tribune	3/4 stars
Entertainment Weekly	A−
The Independent	3/5 stars
The Irish Times	2/5 stars
Los Angeles Times	3/4 stars
MSN Music (Consumer Guide)	B
Rolling Stone	3/5 stars
Spin	5/10
USA Today	3/4 stars

The Element of Freedom received generally positive reviews from critics. At Metacritic, which assigns a normalized rating out of 100 to reviews from mainstream publications, it received an average score of 67, based on 14 reviews.

Andrew Burgess of MusicOMH said that the album's production is "a perfect counterpoint to Keys' voice, and the sentiment she's trying to convey", while calling the album one of "the best pop albums of 2009". Chicago Tribune writer Greg Kot called the album Keys' "most consistent album and also her most low-key", and found it less "forced or gimmicky" than her previous albums. Killian Fox of The Observer called it "a confident, well-crafted modern soul record" that was made without "doing anything groundbreaking". Los Angeles Times writer Randy Lewis wrote favorably of Keys' thematic approach, stating that she "digs deep into the multitude of implications of independence". Leah Greenblatt of Entertainment Weekly said that Keys has "established herself as an increasingly rare thing in pop music: the class act", noting that the "often-banal lyrics" were carried by her "quicksilver" voice. USA Today's Steve Jones called its songs "consistently strong and thematically cohesive", and found the album "more nuanced and intimate" than Keys' previous work.

In a mixed review for The Independent, Simon Price found the songs monotonous and said that they "drift by disappointingly, anodyne and indistinguishable". Rob Sheffield, writing in Rolling Stone, felt that the production "compresses [Keys'] voice, making it sound a lot less like her, especially on the ballads". Mikael Wood of Spin accused Keys of being "uninterested in breaking new ground, snooze-controlling her way through a series of familiar piano-soul platitudes". Tyler Lewis of PopMatters pointed out in his review "uninspiring, trendy electronica production, strident lead vocal performances, and banal lyricism". Chicago Sun-Times writer Jim DeRogatis panned its lyrics as "empty cliches" and found the music pretentious. Robert Christgau, writing for MSN Music, named it "dud of the month", indicating "a bad record whose details rarely merit further thought". He interpreted Keys' attempt at "melismatic pain" to be "formal ploy merely, a diva-by-default's privilege", and found it "far from a shock but definitely a disappointment to watch Ms. Trained Pianist survey her branding options and choose the bland card over the brains card".

In August 2025, the album was ranked at number 99 on Billboard's list of Top R&B/Hip-Hop Albums of the 21st Century.

=== Accolades ===
Year	Award	Category	Nominee(s)	Result	Ref.
2010	NAACP Image Award	Outstanding Album	The Element of Freedom	Nominated	
2010	NAACP Image Award	Outstanding Music Video	"Try Sleeping with a Broken Heart"	Nominated	
2010	NAACP Image Award	Outstanding Female Artist	Alicia Keys	Nominated	
2010	MTV Video Music Award Japan	Video of the Year	"Doesn't Mean Anything"	Nominated	
2010	MTV Video Music Award Japan	Best R&B Video	"Doesn't Mean Anything"	Nominated	
2010	Teen Choice Award	Choice Music – R&B Artist	Alicia Keys	Nominated	
2010	Teen Choice Award	Choice Music – Album	The Element of Freedom	Nominated	
2010	Premios Oye!	English Record of the Year	The Element of Freedom	Nominated	
2010	American Music Award	Favorite Soul/R&B Album	The Element of Freedom	Nominated	
2010	American Music Award	Favorite Soul/R&B Female Artist	Alicia Keys	Nominated	
2010	Soul Train Music Award	Best R&B/Soul Female Artist	Alicia Keys	Won	
2010	Soul Train Music Award	Best Album of the Year	The Element of Freedom	Nominated	
2010	Soul Train Music Award	Best Song of the Year	"Un-Thinkable (I'm Ready)"	Nominated	
2010	Soul Train Music Award	The Ashford & Simpson Songwriter's Award	"Un-Thinkable (I'm Ready)"	Won	
2010	MP3 Music Award	The BFV Award	"Try Sleeping with a Broken Heart"	Nominated	
2010	The Record of the Year		"Empire State of Mind (Part II) Broken Down"	Nominated	
2011	MTV Video Play Award		"Try Sleeping with a Broken Heart"	Gold	
2011	Hungarian Music Award	Modern Pop-Rock Album of the Year	The Element of Freedom	Nominated	
2011	Swiss Music Award	Best Foreign Urban Album	The Element of Freedom	Nominated	
2011	NAACP Image Award	Outstanding Music Video	"Un-Thinkable (I'm Ready)"	Won	
2011	New York Music Award	Best R&B Single	"Try Sleeping with a Broken Heart"	Won	
2011	New York Music Award	Best R&B Songwriter	Alicia Keys	Won	
2011	RTHK International Pop Poll Award	Top Female Artist	Alicia Keys	Nominated	
2011	RTHK International Pop Poll Award	Top Ten International Gold Songs	"Put It in a Love Song"	Nominated	
2011	Billboard Music Award	Top R&B Artist	Alicia Keys	Nominated	
2011	Billboard Music Award	Top R&B Song	"Un-Thinkable (I'm Ready)"	Nominated	
2011	BMI Urban Award	Award Winning Songs	"Un-Thinkable (I'm Ready)"	Won	
2011	BMI Urban Award	Award Winning Songs	"Try Sleeping with a Broken Heart"	Won	

== Commercial performance ==
The Element of Freedom debuted at number two on the US Billboard 200, selling 417,000 copies in its first week. This became Keys' first album to not debut at number one on that chart. In its second week, the album fell to number four on the chart, selling an additional 280,000 copies. In its third week, the album climbed to number three, selling 80,000 more copies. In its fourth week, the album fell to number four, selling 62,000 copies. As of July 2014, it had sold 1.6 million copies in the US. On August 11, 2020, the album was certified double platinum by the Recording Industry Association of America (RIAA) for combined sales and album-equivalent units of over two million units in the United States.

In the United Kingdom, the album debuted at number 17 on the UK Albums Chart on December 20, 2009. It later climbed to number one on February 7, 2010, making it Keys' first album to ever to top the chart. It also spent 13 consecutive weeks atop the UK R&B Albums Chart. On July 22, 2013, the album was certified triple platinum by the British Phonographic Industry (BPI) for sales of over 900,000 copies in the UK. As of November 2016, the album has sold 1,015,071 copies in the United Kingdom.

In Canada, the album entered the Canadian Albums Chart at number five, and was certified platinum by the Music Canada (MC) on December 23, 2009, for shipments in excess of 80,000 units. In mainland Europe, the album reached number one in Switzerland, while charting within the top five in the Netherlands, Portugal, and Spain, and the top 10 in Germany, Norway, and Poland. As of August 2012, the album had sold over four million copies worldwide.

== Track listing ==
The Element of Freedom – standard edition
No.	Title	Writer(s)	Producer(s)	Length
1.	"The Element of Freedom" (Intro)			0:12
2.	"Love Is Blind"	Alicia Keys; Jeff Bhasker	Bhasker; Keys	3:49
3.	"Doesn't Mean Anything"	Keys; Kerry "Krucial" Brothers, Jr.	Brothers; Keys	4:32
4.	"Try Sleeping with a Broken Heart"	Bhasker; Keys; Patrick "Plain Pat" Reynolds	Bhasker	4:09
5.	"Wait Til You See My Smile"	Keys; Bhasker; Kasseem "Swizz Beatz" Dean	Keys; Bhasker	4:01
6.	"That's How Strong My Love Is"	Keys	Keys	4:04
7.	"Un-Thinkable (I'm Ready)"	Keys; Aubrey Graham; Brothers; Noah "40" Shebib	Keys; Brothers; 40	4:09
8.	"Love Is My Disease"	Keys; Brothers; Toby Gad; Meleni Smith	Brothers; Gad^{[a]}	4:01
9.	"Like the Sea"	Keys; Bhasker	Keys; Bhasker	4:13
10.	"Put It in a Love Song" (featuring Beyoncé)	Keys; Dean	Swizz Beatz; Keys	3:15
11.	"This Bed"	Keys; Brothers; Steve Mostyn	Keys; Brothers	3:45
12.	"Distance and Time"	Keys; Brothers; Mostyn	Keys; Brothers	4:27
13.	"How It Feels to Fly"	Keys; Brothers	Keys; Brothers	4:42
14.	"Empire State of Mind (Part II) Broken Down"	Keys; Al Shuckburgh; Shawn Carter; Jane't "Jnay" Sewell-Ulepić; Angela Hunte; Bert Keyes; Sylvia Robinson	Al Shux; Keys	3:36
Total length:				53:04

The Element of Freedom – Japanese edition
No.	Title	Writer(s)	Producer(s)	Length
15.	"Stolen Moments"	Keys; Brothers; Lamont Green; Wah Wah Watson	Keys; Brothers	4:52
16.	"Heaven's Door"	Keys; Brothers	Keys; Brothers	3:18
Total length:				61:05

The Element of Freedom – deluxe edition
No.	Title	Writer(s)	Producer(s)	Length
15.	"Through It All"	Keys; Brothers	Keys; Brothers	4:28
16.	"Pray for Forgiveness"	Keys; Linda Perry	Keys; Brothers	4:44
Total length:				62:17

The Element of Freedom – Japanese deluxe edition
No.	Title	Writer(s)	Producer(s)	Length
17.	"Stolen Moments"	Keys; Brothers; Green; Watson	Keys; Brothers	4:52
18.	"Heaven's Door"	Keys; Brothers	Keys; Brothers	3:18
Total length:				70:27

The Element of Freedom – deluxe edition (bonus DVD)
No.	Title	Length
1.	"Doesn't Mean Anything" (intimate studio performance)	3:55
2.	"Empire State of Mind (Part II) Broken Down" (intimate studio performance)	1:59
3.	"Try Sleeping with a Broken Heart" (intimate studio performance)	3:39
4.	"No One" (intimate studio performance)	4:09
5.	"Doesn't Mean Anything" (music video)	5:13
Total length:		18:55

The Element of Freedom – Empire Edition (bonus disc)
No.	Title	Writer(s)	Producer(s)	Length
1.	"Lover Man"	Keys; Brothers	Keys; Brothers	3:17
2.	"We're Almost There"	Brian Holland; Eddie Holland	Beatz; Keys	3:37
3.	"No One" (live)	Keys; Brothers; George D. Harry		4:00
4.	"Like You'll Never See Me Again" (live)	Keys; Brothers		4:52
5.	"If I Ain't Got You" (live)	Keys		4:44
6.	"Karma" (live)	Keys; Brothers; Taneisha Smith		3:14
7.	"Fallin'" (live)	Keys		3:33
Total length:				27:17

=== Notes ===
- ^{^[a]} signifies a co-producer.
- "Empire State of Mind (Part II) Broken Down" contains a sample from "Love on a Two-Way Street", written by Bert Keyes and Sylvia Robinson, as performed by The Moments.

== Personnel ==
Credits were adapted from the liner notes.

Musicians

- Alicia Keys – B3 organ, concept, CP-70, keyboards, Moog bass, Moog synth, piano, Prophet organ, Rhodes, synths, synth programming, vocals, Wurlitzer
- Carlos Alomar – electric guitar (tracks 7, 8, 10, 13)
- Beyoncé – featured vocals (track 10)
- Jeff Bhasker – background vocals (tracks 2, 4), drum programming (track 2); keyboards (tracks 2, 4, 5), synths (tracks 2, 5, 9), synth programming (track 4)
- Kerry Brothers Jr. – drum programming
- Drake – background vocals (track 7)
- Toby Gad – guitar, keyboards (track 8)
- Jeff Gitelman – electric guitar (track 11)
- Ron Haney – electric guitar (track 6)
- LIV'RE – choir (track 13)
- Steve Mostyn – bass guitar (tracks 8, 10), additional piano (track 11), Moog bass (track 12)
- Paul Pesco – acoustic guitar, electric guitar (track 3)
- Patrick "Plain Pat" Reynolds – drum programming (tracks 4, 5)
- Davide Rossi – cello, strings arrangement, strings, viola, violin (tracks 6)
- Noah "40" Shebib – drum programming, keyboards (track 7)
- Al Shux – keyboards, programming (track 14)
- John "Jubu" Smith – electric guitar (track 6)
- Swizz Beatz – drum programming (track 10)
- Steven Wolf – live drums (tracks 3, 5, 8)

Additional personnel

- Kiku/BabyAlpaca – artwork, design
- Erwin Gorostiza – creative director
- Ashunta Sheriff – make-up
- Tippi Shorter – hair
- Yu Tsai – photography
- Wouri Vice – stylist

Technical personnel

- Alicia Keys – executive producer, producer
- Jeff Bhasker – producer
- Kerry Brothers Jr. – executive producer, producer
- Toby Gad – co-producer & additional engineering (track 8)
- Noah "40" Shebib – producer, recording (track 7)
- Al Shux – producer
- Swizz Beatz – producer (track 10)
- Peter Edge – executive producer
- Jeff Robinson – executive producer
- Erik Madrid – mix assistant
- Manny Marroquin – mixing
- Tony Maserati – mixing (tracks 13, 14)
- Christian Plata – mix assistant
- Christian Baker – assistant engineer
- George Fullan – assistant engineer
- Ann Mincieli – engineer, recording, album coordination
- Val Brathwaite – assistant engineer
- Chris Soper – assistant engineer (track 10)
- Valente Torres – assistant engineer
- Miki Tsutsumi – assistant engineer, additional engineering
- Stuart White – assistant engineer, additional engineering, mix assistant
- Dave Kutch – mastering

== Charts ==
=== Weekly charts ===
Chart (2009–2010)	Peak position
Australian Albums (ARIA)	19
Australian Urban Albums (ARIA)	3
Austrian Albums (Ö3 Austria)	23
Belgian Albums (Ultratop Flanders)	11
Belgian Albums (Ultratop Wallonia)	17
Canadian Albums (Billboard)	5
Croatian Albums (HDU)	19
Czech Albums (ČNS IFPI)	12
Danish Albums (Hitlisten)	19
Dutch Albums (Album Top 100)	2
European Top 100 Albums (Billboard)	3
Finnish Albums (Suomen virallinen lista)	13
French Albums (SNEP)	13
German Albums (Offizielle Top 100)	10
Greek International Albums (IFPI)	7
Irish Albums (IRMA)	9
Italian Albums (FIMI)	15
Japanese Albums (Oricon)	9
Mexican Albums (Top 100 Mexico)	76
New Zealand Albums (RMNZ)	22
Norwegian Albums (VG-lista)	7
Polish Albums (ZPAV)	7
Portuguese Albums (AFP)	5
Scottish Albums (Official Charts)	2
South African Albums (RISA)	2
Spanish Albums (Promusicae)	3
Swedish Albums (Sverigetopplistan)	24
Swiss Albums (Schweizer Hitparade)	1
UK Albums (Official Charts)	1
UK R&B Albums (Official Charts)	1
US Billboard 200	2
US Top R&B/Hip-Hop Albums (Billboard)	1

=== Year-end charts ===
Chart (2009)	Position
Australian Urban Albums (ARIA)	24
UK Albums (OCC)	106

Chart (2010)	Position
Australian Urban Albums (ARIA)	13
Belgian Albums (Ultratop Flanders)	38
Belgian Albums (Ultratop Wallonia)	45
Canadian Albums (Billboard)	24
Danish Albums (Hitlisten)	85
Dutch Albums (MegaCharts)	11
European Top 100 Albums (Billboard)	6
French Albums (SNEP)	96
German Albums (Offizielle Top 100)	60
Japanese Albums (Oricon)	76
Spanish Albums (PROMUSICAE)	49
Swiss Albums (Schweizer Hitparade)	9
UK Albums (OCC)	7
US Billboard 200	11
US Top R&B/Hip-Hop Albums (Billboard)	3

Chart (2011)	Position
US Top R&B/Hip-Hop Albums (Billboard)	93

=== Decade-end charts ===
Chart (2010–2019)	Position
UK Albums (OCC)	63
US Billboard 200	148

== Certifications ==
Region	Certification	Certified units/sales
Australia (ARIA)	Gold	35,000^{^}
Canada (Music Canada)	Platinum	80,000^{^}
Denmark (IFPI Danmark)	Platinum	20,000^{‡}
France (SNEP)	Platinum	100,000^{*}
Germany (BVMI)	Gold	100,000^{^}
Italy (FIMI)	Gold	35,000^{*}
Japan (RIAJ)	Gold	100,000^{^}
Netherlands (NVPI)	Gold	25,000^{^}
New Zealand (RMNZ)	Gold	7,500^{‡}
Poland (ZPAV)	Platinum	20,000^{*}
Spain (Promusicae)	Gold	30,000^{^}
Switzerland (IFPI Switzerland)	Platinum	30,000^{^}
United Kingdom (BPI)	3× Platinum	1,015,071
United States (RIAA)	2× Platinum	2,000,000^{‡}
^{*} Sales figures based on certification alone.^{^} Shipments figures based on certification alone.^{‡} Sales+streaming figures based on certification alone.

== Release history ==
List of release dates and formats
Region	Date	Edition(s)	Format(s)	Label(s)	Ref.
Australia	December 11, 2009	Standard; deluxe	CD; CD+DVD; digital download	Sony	
Germany	December 11, 2009	Standard; deluxe	CD; CD+DVD; digital download	Sony	
United Kingdom	December 14, 2009	Standard; deluxe	CD; CD+DVD; digital download	RCA	
Argentina	December 15, 2009	Standard; deluxe	CD; CD+DVD; digital download	Sony	
Brazil	December 15, 2009	Standard; deluxe	CD; CD+DVD; digital download	Sony	
Canada	December 15, 2009	Standard; deluxe	CD; CD+DVD; digital download	Sony	
United States	December 15, 2009	Standard; deluxe; Empire	CD; CD+DVD; digital download; double CD; vinyl	J	
Japan	December 16, 2009	Standard	CD; digital download	Sony	
Japan	January 1, 2010	Deluxe	CD+DVD	Sony	

== See also ==
- Album era
- List of Billboard number-one R&B albums of 2010
- List of UK Albums Chart number ones of the 2010s
- List of UK R&B Albums Chart number ones of 2010
