= Kerry Brothers Jr. =

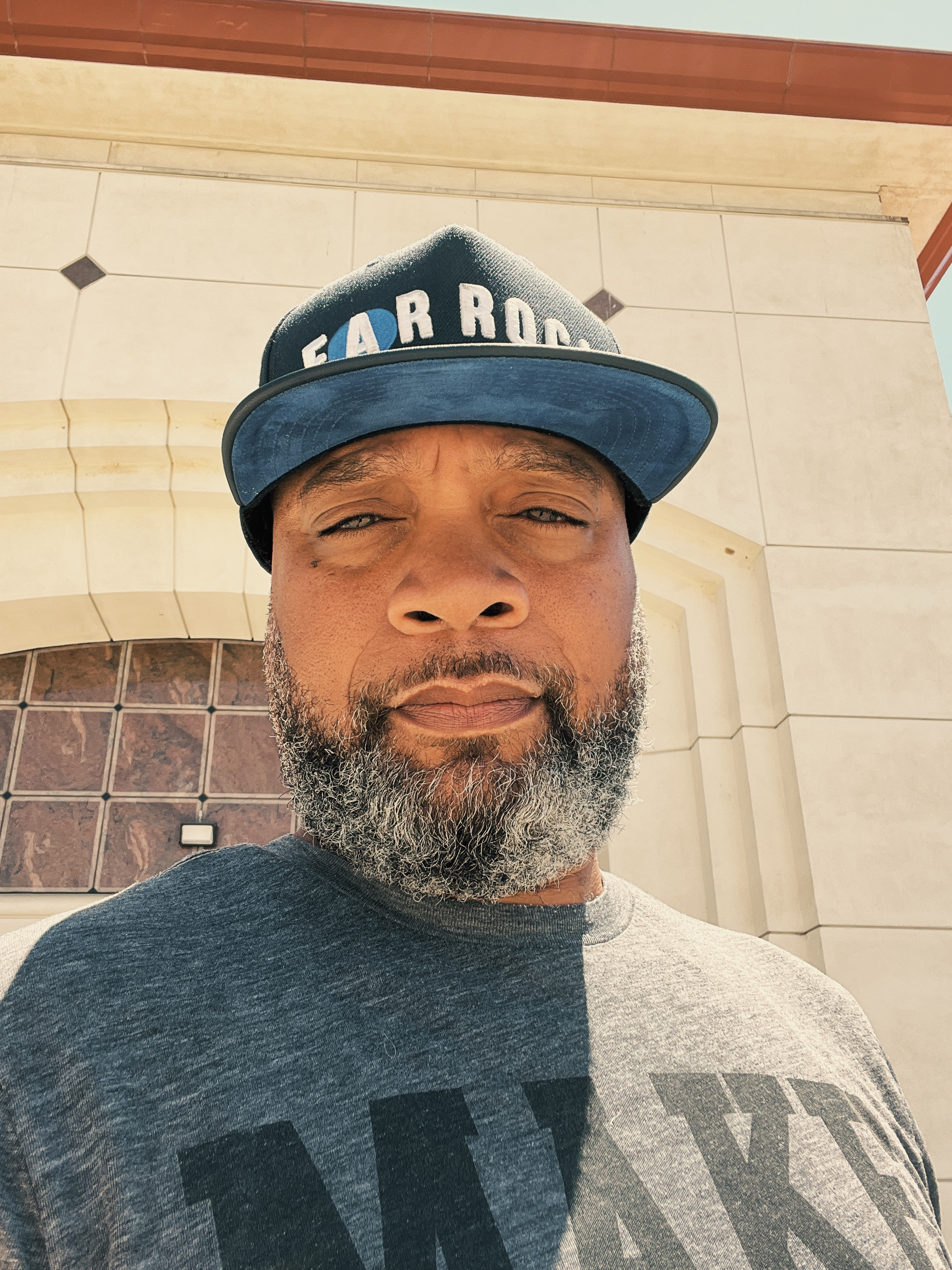
- Brothers in 2022

Background information
- Also known as: Krucial; Mr. Brothers
- Born: October 1, 1970 (age 55); Brooklyn, New York, U.S.
- Education: Kingsborough Community College
- Genres: Hip hop; R&B
- Children: 4
- Occupations: Record producer; songwriter; rapper
- Years active: 1990s–present
- Labels: Krucial Noise; KrucialKeys
- Website: shop.krucialnoise.com

Kerry Brothers Jr. (born October 1, 1970), also known as Krucial, is an American record producer, songwriter and rapper. Both natives of New York City, he and singer-songwriter Alicia Keys began a musical partnership in 1998, with songwriting and production work in tandem on several of the latter's earlier releases—Songs in A Minor (2001), The Diary of Alicia Keys (2003), As I Am (2007), and The Element of Freedom (2009). He has won two Grammy Awards: Best R&B Album for his contributions to Songs in A Minor, and Best R&B Song for Keys' 2007 single, "No One".

In 2006, Brothers released his debut extended play (EP) Take Da Hood Back. Brothers co-wrote songs that appeared on the soundtracks of films such as Dr. Dolittle, Shaft, and Ali. He has also worked with other R&B and hip hop acts, including Mario, Rakim, Angie Stone, Nas, Keyshia Cole, Goapele, Drake and K'naan.

== Early life ==
Brothers was born in Brooklyn and grew up in Harlem and Far Rockaway, Queens.

== Career ==
Initially a teen rapper, Brothers signed with B-Boy Records as part of the group K-Bee and Ceil B. In 1988, they released the 2-sided single: "Who Am I" and "We Are The Move". After their debut album was shelved due to creative differences with the label, the group split up. Brothers then began to producing beats for him to perform on. In the early 1990s, Brothers moved to Harlem, where he frequented open mics. During this time, he was a founding member of the collective "Melanin 2000", who visited Nuyoricans Poet Café and Lyricist Lounge downtown in Greenwich Village. Later on, they performed at Washington Square Park, where he met Alicia Keys c. 1998, who, at the time, was part of an R&B ensemble.

Brothers and Keys took five years to produce, record and write for Keys' debut album, Songs in A Minor (2001). Both of them co-founded the company KrucialKeys, and co-founded a recording studio, the Oven Studios, in Long Island. He won Best R&B Album at the 2002 Grammy Awards for his contributions to the album, as well as Best R&B Song for her 2007 single, "No One".

In 2006, Brothers released his debut EP Take Da Hood Back. Brothers has also co-wrote songs that have appeared on the soundtracks to the films Dr. Dolittle, Shaft, and Ali.

== See also ==
- Alicia Keys
