= Oven Studios =

Recording studio

Coordinates: 40.851119°N 73.635003°W

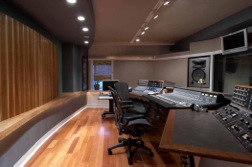
- Control room of the studio in 2014
- Company type: Recording studio
- Industry: Music
- Founded: 2005
- Headquarters: New York City, New York, United States
- Owners: Alicia Keys and Kerry Brothers Jr.

Oven Studios is the personal recording studio of American singer-songwriter and record producer Alicia Keys, located in the Chelsea neighborhood in Manhattan, New York.

== Background ==
Designed by the Walters-Storyk Design Group, the studio was originally located at 186 Glen Cove Avenue in Glen Cove, New York. It features a grand piano and two isolation booths. Keys says the building is reminiscent of her grandmother's house and has decorated the walls of the studios to include pictures of Nina Simone, Janis Joplin and Bob Marley. Opened in 2005, Keys co-owns the studio with her production and songwriting partner Kerry Brothers Jr. According to Walters-Storyk, the design was important to the acoustics of the building:

"In the live room, the design specified special acoustic wood slotted with holes that was imported from Europe. This wood, which is 50% absorptive, played an important function in evening out the overall frequency response."

The studio was relocated to New York City by the recording of Keys' fourth album The Element of Freedom (2009).

== Recordings at Oven ==
=== Albums ===
Adapted from Discogs

- Alicia Keys—As I Am (2007)
- Alicia Keys—The Element of Freedom (2009)
- Sex and the City - Original Motion Picture Soundtrack (2010)
- Nas—Life Is Good (2012)
- Alicia Keys—Girl on Fire (2012)
- Beyoncé—Beyoncé (2013)
- Ella Henderson - Chapter One (2014)
- Alicia Keys—Here (2016)
- Alicia Keys—Alicia (2020)

=== Songs ===
- "Don't Give Up (Africa)" (2005) by Alicia Keys and Bono
- "Empire State of Mind" (2009) by Jay Z and Alicia Keys
- "Million Dollar Bill" (2009) by Whitney Houston
- "It's On Again" (2014) by Alicia Keys featuring Kendrick Lamar and Hans Zimmer
