= 28 Thousand Days =

Single by Alicia Keys
- Released: July 31, 2015
- Genre: R&B
- Length: 3:21
- Label: RCA
- Songwriters: Alicia Keys; Mark Batson; Harold Lilly
- Producers: Keys; Batson; Swizz Beatz

Alicia Keys singles chronology
"We Are Here" (2014)	"28 Thousand Days" (2015)	"In Common" (2016)

Music video
- "28 Thousand Days (Audio)" on YouTube

"28 Thousand Days" is a song by American recording artist Alicia Keys. It was written by Keys, Swizz Beatz, Mark Batson and Harold Lilly and produced by Keys, Batson and Beatz. The song was released on July 31, 2015, through RCA Records as the song of the 2015 Levi's women's jeans advertisement campaign. Keys said that the song was inspired by an article she had read, which said the average human life is 76 years, which equals to 28 thousand days.

== Background and reception ==
In 2014, Keys worked with Kendrick Lamar, Hans Zimmer and Pharrell Williams for The Amazing Spider-Man 2 song "It's On Again". Keys also released "We Are Here" in September 2014 and "We Gotta Pray" in December 2014. In July 2015 Keys was announced as the brand ambassador and face of Levi's the autumn/winter advertisement campaign for women's jeans and "28 Thousand Days" as the campaign's song. The song was used in TV, cinema and online commercials for the campaign, directed by Malik Hassan Sayeed. On the day of the song's release, Keys tweeted "I've been dyin' to share this new music with you! Live everyday like its your last!!"

Vibe wrote of the song that it has an "infectious melody" and "boisterous production" by Swizz Beatz. Rap-Up called the song an "uplifting anthem" with "blaring horns". MTV News called the production "bass heavy" while Entertainment Weekly described the song as "stomping" and "soulful" and wrote that Keys is "in prime form" on the song.

== Live performances ==
Keys performed the song at a concert for her album Here at Village Underground in London 26 May 2016 and at Troubadour in Los Angeles on 20 July 2016. Keys performed the song at the Apple Music Festival in London on 20 September 2016 Keys performed the song during Here in Times Square concert special on 9 October 2016 on Times Square in New York City and during an episode of Landmarks Live: Great Performances, 20 January 2017 on PBS . On 7 March 2017, Keys performed the on at Houston Livestock Show and Rodeo. On 17 September 2017, Keys performed the song at Rock in Rio music festival in Rio de Janeiro, Brazil. On 1 November 2017 Keys performed the song at Baloise Session in Basel, Switzerland. Keys performed the song on the 2019 Dubai International Jazz Festival.

== Track listing ==
Digital download
No.	Title	Length
1.	"28 Thousand Days"	3:21

== Charts ==
Chart (2015)	Peak position
France (SNEP)	198
