= Here in Times Square =

- Genre: Concert
- Directed by: Hamish Hamilton
- Starring: Alicia Keys
- Country of origin: United States
- Original language: English

Production
- Production location: Times Square

Original release
- Network: BET
- Release: November 3, 2016

Here in Times Square is a concert television special featuring American singer-songwriter Alicia Keys. Recorded at Times Square in New York City, the concert featured Keys and various guests performing songs from Keys sixth studio album Here (2016) and her previous albums, as well as covers. The concert was directed by Hamish Hamilton and recorded on October 9, 2016. It aired on BET in the United States on November 3, 2016 and later in other countries.

The concert featured guest appearances from a number of artists. Q-Tip, Nas, Questlove, John Mayer made an appearance and Jay Z joined Keys for a performance of "Empire State of Mind" (2009). Keys was joined on stage by her band and background singers. Tickets to the concert were free. The event was sponsored by Olay and the Mayor's Office for Media and Entertainment.

== Background ==
In late September 2016, it was revealed that Keys was to perform a concert in New York City, but the date and the location were unknown. On October 3, Keys announced the concert in an Instagram video and revealed the date, but not the location of the concert. She posted on Twitter "NYC!! Who’s ready to vibe with me on 10/9?! Location is a secret (shhhh 😉) but it’s ICONIC! Tickets are free, but it’s one per person so tag your friends!". Keys posted videos on Twitter from the rehearsals with the hashtag #HereinTimesSquare. She revealed the location of the concert on Saturday evening, the concert taking place on Sunday evening. She commented on the performance for Time Out saying "I’ve never done this before. I guess that’s where I’m at right now. I’ve never done any of it before. You’re going to get a taste of how art and activism cross over in a way that’s so emotional, so triumphant". Keys intentionally scheduled the concert for October 9, which is the birthday of John Lennon. Stage was set up on Duffy Square part of Times Square. The day of the concert, Keys tweeted "Performing in the center of my city tonight!! This is my backyard Wow!!", and gave an interview to The Guardian, where she explained that "Times Square was dark – gee, it was dismal. In the 80s, when I was a little girl, this whole Midtown area was a different world. These are the streets that I walked, and learned my lessons on, and heard the music, and witnessed disenfranchised people, and people who just had dreams and hopes".

== Concert synopsis ==
Keys performed fifteen songs. The concert started with Keys singing "The Gospel" and then moving on to "28 Thousand Days" (2015). Then she sang a "soft-jazzy rendition" of "You Don't Know My Name" (2003). Before singing the next song, she invited Q-Tip on the stage, saying ""I think I need to call my brother really quick". Q-Tip entered the stage and the two began mixing old hip-hop songs over a beat and piano, and Keys continued to sing "She Don't Really Care". As the performance was ending, Keys said "Now New York, there’s no way I could be in NYC tonight and not bring out on the stage, my brother Nas!". They performed "One Love" (1994) from Nas' album Illmatic (1994). Then, she proceeded to perform the singles "Fallin'" (2001), "In Common" (2016) and "Hallelujah". She invited the next guest artist Questlove on the stage to play the drums, and performed a medley "If I Ain't Got You" (2004) and "Gravity" (2006) as a duet with John Mayer, who also played the guitar.

Keys then played her new single "Blended Family (What You Do for Love)" (2016). She covered the Bob Marley song "War" (1976) and stated "Our brothers and sisters are being shot in cold blood for doing nothing. Chicago is like a war zone. Our gun laws don't work". Then, she played another socially conscious song "We Are Here" (2014) and "No One" (2007). "Empire State of Mind" (2009) was the second to last song of the show, which began with a rendition of Keys' own version "Empire State of Mind (Part II) Broken Down" (2010), but soon transitioned to the original song, as Jay-Z emerged from the back of the stage as his verse began. During the concert, Keys voiced her opinion on presidential candidate Donald Trump, after a video tape had leaked about Trump talking about sexually assaulting women. She told the audience "this ignorant, racist, jackass, whose name rhymes “Scump” has to nerve to talk about grabbing pussy? You know what I say to that?", and then raised her middle finger an encouraged people to vote in the upcoming elections. To celebrate the birthday of John Lennon, Keys ended the concert with a medley of "Holy War" and "Imagine" (1971), filling the Times Square billboards with messages to end discrimination, war and climate change. She concluded the concert by saying "I love you with all of my heart. Let's rise up and shine up".

== Setlist ==
1. "The Gospel"
2. "28 Thousand Days"
3. "You Don't Know My Name"
4. "She Don't Really Care"
5. "One Love" (performed with Nas)
6. "Fallin'"
7. "In Common"
8. "Hallelujah"
9. "If I Ain't Got You" / "Gravity" (performed with Questlove and John Mayer)
10. "Blended Family (What You Do for Love)"
11. "War"
12. "We Are Here"
13. "No One"
14. "Empire State of Mind (Part II) Broken Down" / "Empire State of Mind" (performed with Jay Z)
15. "Holy War" / "Imagine"

== Credits and personnel ==
- Director
  - Hamish Hamilton
- Band
  - Adam Blackstone – MD/Bass
  - Justin Gilbert – Keys
  - Gimel ”Young Guru” Keaton – DJ
  - Whitney Keaton - Backgrounds
  - Raphael ”Raii” Smith - Backgrounds

== Critical reception ==
Nerisha Penrose form Billboard wrote that "Keys delivered a captivating hour-and-a-half-long show that also served as a loving tribute to hip-hop history, right near the heart of its birthplace". Rahcaell Davis from Essence wrote that Keys "brought out a handful of top-notch musical guests" and that "each artist on the bill lit up the stage and had the crowd in an uproar". Sasha Geffen from MTV News commented that "Empire State of Mind" performance "doesn't really get a better venue than smack in the middle of Manhattan". Mic wrote that "Keys put together a star-studded show" and praised Nas' and Jay-Z¨s appearance, calling it "the biggest, most unexpected, most iconic moment of the night". Raisa Bruner from Time wrote that Keys and Jay Z gave an "electrifying performance" of "Empire State of Mind".

== Broadcasts ==
The concert aired on BET on November 3, 2016. The concert was originally approximately hour and a half long, but it was cut to one hour for broadcasting, omitting "In Common", "Hallelujah", "War" and "We Are Here" performances. In France, the concert aired on December 24, 2016 on BET France. In Finland, the concert was shown on Yle TV2 on May 13, 2017 and twice on Yle Teema & Fem, on July 28 and July 31, 2017. In Brazil, the concert aired on Canal Bis on the International Women's Day, April 8, 2017 and on June 5, 2017. Brazilian channel Multishow broadcast the concert on 26 May 2017. BET Africa broadcast the concert on 16 September 2017.
