= Hallelujah (Alicia Keys song) =

2016 promotional single by Alicia Keys

Promotional single by Alicia Keys

from the album Here
- Released: June 17, 2016
- Genre: R&B; soul ballad
- Length: 3:09
- Label: RCA
- Songwriter(s): Alicia Keys; Jimmy Napes
- Producer(s): Alicia Keys; Jimmy Napes

Audio video
- "Hallelujah" on YouTube

"Hallelujah" is a song by American singer and songwriter Alicia Keys. It was released as the promotional single from Keys' sixth studio album Here (2016) through RCA Records on June 17, 2016.

== Background and release ==
In early May 2016, Keys performed "In Common", which had been released as a single the same month, as well as "Hallelujah" from her upcoming, then yet untitled sixth studio album, on an episode of Saturday Night Live. On June 17, "Hallelujah" was featured in the trailer for Keys' film Let Me In, a film about refugees. Let Me In portrays the refugee crisis as if it were happening in Los Angeles, and it was written and directed by Jonathan Olinger and starring Keys. According to official synopsis, "Starring Alicia Keys, the film follows her and her family's quest to survive after they experience unimaginable violence" as the family has to "navigate oceans and desserts" in order to "cross the border into Mexico". Let Me In was premiered on June 20, World Refugee Day, and also features "Hallelujah". Digital download of the song was released on Apple Music on June 20, 2016.

== Composition and lyrics ==
"Hallelujah" is an R&B and soul ballad and lasts for a duration of three minutes and nine seconds. The songs instrumentation includes piano, strings and drums as well as hand claps, and the song has been described as being "piano-driven", "stripped down" and "gospel-inspired". On the song, Keys sings "I've been praying but I'm paying for my sins" and repeats the line "hallelujah, let me in".

Danny Schwartz from HotNewHipHop wrote that Keys "calls to heaven on high to absolve her sins". Brian Josephs from Spin wrote that "Hallelujah" is much more melancholic" than "In Common" and the song "bases itself off piano chords". According to Rap-Up, the song has a "religious theme that plays out in the lyrics". HotNewHipHop's Kevin Goddard wrote that the song is "[b]acked by a strong, piano-led instrumental" and the lyrics "address[..] the topic of wild refugees". Commenting on the song's composition, Isha Thorpe from Revolt wrote that the "languid, neo-gospel track sees Keys punctuating her words with sparse piano chords before handclaps and dramatic strings close out the tune" adding that the song is about "fear, forgiveness and faith".

== Critical reception ==
Kim Michelle from The Fader described the song as a "charged gospel-inflected anthem". That Grape Juice called the song "enchanting", adding that "Its minimalism, both from a production and vocal standpoint, allow for the lyrics to both lead and engage". The Source commented that the "spirited redemption song" is "reminiscent of past emotional Alicia Keys ballads that have made her career a legendary one". Kevin Goddard from HotNewHipHop wrote that Keys "showcases her exceptional vocals" on the song and described Keys' delivery of the song as "powerful" and "emotional". Michael Gonik from Okayplayer called the song " stunning", adding that the song shows Keys "returning to her slow-burning sonic stamp, which we've all grown to love". In her review of Here, Sal Cinquemani from Slant wrote that "Keys's voice cracks and creaks as she pleads for salvation on "Hallelujah", the vocal imperfections, spare percussion, and soulful handclaps juxtaposed with a more refined string section. Reviewing Here, Maurita Salkey from Revolt named it one of her favorite songs on the album, writing "Keys mentions her journey to spirituality while repeatedly asking to be forgiven of her sins".

== Live performances ==
Keys performed the song for the first time live on television on Saturday Night Live episode of May 7, 2016, along with another song, "In Common". Billboard commented that Keys "took the audience to church" with her performance while Rap-Up wrote that Keys "belted out the soulful song as her band clapped their hands". According to Spin, the performance "clos[ed] on Keys' show-stopping final notes". Keys performed the song on the Italian tv-show Che tempo che fa in June 2016. In September 2016, Keys performed the song at the Apple Music Festival in Roundhouse, London. In May 2016, Keys performed the song for La Blogothèque's Take Away Show, released in November 2016.

== Release history ==
Release history and formats for "Hallelujah"
Region	Date	Format	Label	Ref.
France	June 17, 2016	Digital download	RCA	
Various	June 17, 2016	Streaming	RCA	
