= Like I Would =

Single by Zayn

from the album Mind of Mine
- Released: 10 March 2016
- Recorded: 2016
- Genre: Dance; electro-R&B
- Length: 3:13
- Label: RCA
- Songwriters: Zayn Malik; Chase Wells; James Griffin; Kevin Rains; James Emerson; Salvador Waviest
- Producer: XYZ

Zayn singles chronology
"Pillowtalk" (2016)	"Like I Would" (2016)	"Wrong" (2016)

Music video
- "Like I Would" on YouTube

"Like I Would" (stylised in all caps) is a song recorded by English singer-songwriter Zayn for the deluxe edition of his solo debut studio album, Mind of Mine (2016). It was written by Zayn, Chase Wells, James Griffin, Kevin Rains, James Emerson and Salvador Waviest and produced by XYZ. The song was released on 10 March 2016 and later impacted US contemporary hit radio on 24 May 2016, as the album's official second single. "Like I Would" is an electro-R&B and dance song, with an upbeat backdrop, steady bass, a disco groove and a funky hook.

Lyrically, the song tries to prove to someone that he is the best thing she is ever going to get and that her new lover lacks the skills he brings to the bedroom. Commercially, the song reached the top-forty in eight countries, including Australia, Canada, Ireland and the United Kingdom. It also became his second song as a solo artist to reach the Billboard Hot 100, and also topped the country's dance charts. The music video for the song, inspired by Tron film franchise, was directed by Director X and released on 10 May 2016.

== Composition and lyrics ==
"Like I Would" was written by Zayn Malik, Chase Wells, James Griffin, Kevin Rains, James Emerson and Salvador Waviest. It was produced by XYZ. According to the sheet music published at Musicnotes.com by Universal Music Publishing Group, the song is written in the key of A♯ minor, with a tempo of 112 beats per minute. The song follows a chord progression of A#m – A#m/C# – A#m/G# – G7 – A#m/F – A#m. Malik's vocals range from the low-note of F4 to the high note of A#5. It is a dance and electro-R&B song, with an upbeat backdrop, steady bass, a disco groove and a "funky hook." Lyrically, the song finds the singer promising his paramour that he's more apt to satisfy than an unnamed male competitor.

According to Michelle Lulic of Bustle, "the song's lyrics seem to be alluding to a relationship that was definitely strong at one point, but now not so much." In the pre-chorus, he warns: "If we can never go back / Thought you'd like to know that," before singing in the chorus: "He, won't touch you like I do /He, won't love you like I would /He don't know your body /He don't do you right /He won't love you like I would." As noted by Lulic, in the chorus, "[he] is trying to prove to someone that he is the best thing she is ever going to get."

== Release ==
"Like I Would" was first released digitally on 10 March 2016 as the third "instant grat" track from the album, and later serviced to US contemporary hit radio on 24 May 2016 as the album's second single. A remix EP featuring seven remixes from White Panda, Lenno, Sharam Jey, Oliver Nelson, Dave Audé, Troyboi and Rytmeklubben, was released on 27 May 2016 to digital download and streaming.

== Critical reception ==
"Like I Would" received universal acclaim from music critics. The Fader included it in their "11 Songs You Need In Your Life This Week" list, describing it as a "euphoric, super danceable breakup jam". Nate Scott of USA Today ranked it number two on his "10 best songs of the week" list, calling it "another step in the right direction," noting that "the dancey track has verve and Malik's voice shows some range." Lewis Corner and Amy Davidson of Digital Spy also included it in their "10 tracks you need to hear" list, stating that they "were still waiting for that BIG pop banger we know he's capable of" and that "Like I Would" is "just that and then some." Corner later added that the song is "screaming louder than Zayn's fans to be a number-one hit" as the "hook is contagious, the lyric is swoon-worthy arrogant, and the chorus is enough to pop off arena ceilings across the globe." Robbie Daw of Idolator called it "a glorious ’80s throwback". Andrew Milne of musicOMH called it an "exhilarating breakup banger," while Brittany Spanos of Rolling Stone enjoyed it for being a "clubby success."

Edwin Ortiz of Complex stated that it "has major potential to get burn in clubs across the country." Nicholas Parco of New York Daily News stated that the track "is primed to be an early contender for hit of the early summer". Brennan Carley of Spin praised "ZAYN's rich, warm vocals" that "weave themselves around a backing choir before a huge funky hook kicks in." Carley also stated: "What 'Sorry' did to jumpstart Justin Bieber's Purpose, 'Like I Would' is the poppy kick in the ass 'Mind of Mine' needed pre-release." Leah Greenblatt of Entertainment Weekly noted that the song leans "headfirst into sleek, Weeknd-style hedonism," a sentiment that Maeve McDermott of USA Today also expressed, writing that it "give us another clue what R&B contemporary Malik is taking clues from on this record: the Weeknd." Nick Levine of The Independent also agreed with both critics about The Weeknd's reference. Michael Cragg of The Guardian thought it was weird that "the excellent, upbeat 'Like I Would' is relegated to the deluxe edition."

== Commercial performance ==
In the United Kingdom, the song debuted at number 30 on the UK Singles Chart. In Canada, it debuted at number 23 on the Canadian Hot 100 and number 14 on the Canadian Digital Songs chart. In Ireland, it debuted at number 32 on the Irish Singles Chart and reached number 23 on the Irish Radio Airplay Chart. In the United States, it debuted at number 55 on the Billboard Hot 100 and number 18 on the Pop Digital Songs chart. It is Malik's second song to enter the Hot 100, after "Pillowtalk". "Like I Would" also debuted at number 31 on the Digital Songs chart, selling 26,000 downloads, and number 42 on the Streaming Songs chart, with 5.6 million streams. It also debuted at number 21 on the On-Demand Songs chart. In August 2016, "Like I Would" reached number one on the Billboard Hot Dance Club Songs chart.

== Music video ==
The music video for the song was uploaded onto his YouTube and Vevo account on 10 May 2016. It was shot by Director X in a Los Angeles studio. Zayn's appearance in the video, and the video's array of lights and lasers, takes inspiration from the Tron science fiction films. Director X had previously directed Usher's "Yeah", which he said he had "been wanting to redo" differently with "all laser" for a long time. He also cited Tron as inspiration. The video features the Cyclone, a large custom laser rig created by Zayn's laser designers. The video also features energetic dancing by a squad of dancers.

Zayn's appearance in the video, including a neon suit and a bright orange eye contact, takes inspiration from Marvel Comics' current Ghost Rider, Robbie Reyes, who was in turn inspired by Zayn Malik. According to Director X, the orange eye contact was Zayn's idea. It is seen as part of Zayn's "man in the machine" theme, including his 2 May 2016 appearance at Met Gala's Manus x Machina: Fashion in an Age of Technology, where he wore metal robot arms over his tuxedo. The music video reached number 15 on the UK TV Airplay Chart.

The video starts with Zayn "in the center of a beam of neon blue lines of light," as explained by Rolling Stone's Brittany Spanos, who continued: "His full outfit is also covered with neon lines that glow against a black background and he's sporting an orange contact lens on one of his eyes. Elsewhere a crew of dancers, mostly made up of women, dance to the track amidst more neon lights." Brennan Carley of Spin called it "pretty spectacular" with "a stunningly shot treatment."

== Live performances ==
Malik performed "Like I Would" live on The Tonight Show Starring Jimmy Fallon on 24 March 2016, and at the Mind of Mine iHeartRadio release party on 25 March 2016. He also performed the song at the 3rd iHeartRadio Music Awards on 3 April 2016. His performance was ranked the best performance at the show by International Business Times, and the third best performance by Billboard. He also performed the song at KIIS-FM's Wango Tango on 14 May 2016, and during the season 10 finale of The Voice on 24 May 2016.

== Track listing ==
Digital download
No.	Title	Length
1.	"Like I Would"	3:12

Digital download – Remixes
No.	Title	Length
1.	"Like I Would" (The White Panda Remix)	3:18
2.	"Like I Would" (Lenno Remix)	4:36
3.	"Like I Would" (Sharam Jey Remix)	4:41
4.	"Like I Would" (Oliver Nelson Remix)	3:56
5.	"Like I Would" (Dave Audé Mix)	3:46
6.	"Like I Would" (Rytmeklubben Remix)	3:22
7.	"Like I Would" (Troyboi Remix)	3:30

== Credits and personnel ==
Recording

- Recorded at Record Plant, Los Angeles, California; Grove Studios, Los Angeles.
- Mixed at MixStar Studios, Virginia Beach, California.

Personnel

- Zayn Malik – vocals, writing.
- Chase Wells – writing, production, keyboards, programming, guitars.
- James Griffin – writing, production, keyboards, programming.
- Kevin Rains – writing, production, keyboards, programming.
- James Emerson – writing, production, keyboards, programming, guitars.
- Salvador Waviest – writing, production, keyboards, programming, guitars, recording.
- Couros Sheibani – keyboards, programming.
- Serban Ghenea – mixing.
- Henrique Andrade – recording.
- Alex Layne – recording assistant.
- John Hanes – mixing engineer.

Credits adapted from the liner notes of Mind of Mine, RCA Records.

== Charts ==
=== Weekly charts ===
Weekly chart performance for "Like I Would"
Chart (2016)	Peak position
Australia (ARIA)	31
Austria (Ö3 Austria Top 40)	47
Belgium (Ultratop 50 Flanders)	44
Belgium (Ultratip Bubbling Under Wallonia)	17
Canada Hot 100 (Billboard)	23
Canada CHR/Top 40 (Billboard)	35
CIS Airplay (TopHit)	190
Czech Republic Singles Digital (ČNS IFPI)	25
France (SNEP)	117
Germany (GfK)	79
Hungary (Stream Top 40)	28
Ireland (IRMA)	32
Italy (FIMI)	57
Japan Hot 100 (Billboard)	87
Japan Hot Overseas (Billboard)	8
Japan Radio Songs (Billboard)	10
Netherlands (Dutch Top 40 Tipparade)	23
Netherlands (Global Top 40)	39
Netherlands (Single Top 100)	44
New Zealand (Recorded Music NZ)	38
Portugal (AFP)	29
Slovakia Singles Digital (ČNS IFPI)	23
South Korea (Gaon)	55
Sweden (Sverigetopplistan)	39
Switzerland (Schweizer Hitparade)	48
UK Singles (Official Charts)	30
US Billboard Hot 100	55
US Pop Airplay (Billboard)	29
US Dance Club Songs (Billboard)	1

=== Year-end charts ===
Year-end chart rankings for "Like I Would"
Chart (2016)	Position
Netherlands (Global Top 40)	99
US Dance Club Songs (Billboard)	28

== Certifications ==
Region	Certification	Certified units/sales
Australia (ARIA)	Platinum	70,000^{‡}
Brazil (Pro-Música Brasil)	Platinum	60,000^{‡}
Canada (Music Canada)	Platinum	80,000^{‡}
Italy (FIMI)	Gold	25,000^{‡}
New Zealand (RMNZ)	Gold	7,500^{*}
Sweden (GLF)	Gold	20,000^{‡}
United Kingdom (BPI)	Silver	200,000^{‡}
United States (RIAA)	Gold	500,000^{‡}
^{*} Sales figures based on certification alone.^{‡} Sales+streaming figures based on certification alone.

== Release history ==
Country	Date	Format	Label	Ref.
Worldwide	10 March 2016	Digital download	RCA	
United States	24 May 2016	Contemporary hit radio	RCA	
Worldwide	27 May 2016	Remixes EP	RCA	

== See also ==
- List of number-one dance singles of 2016 (U.S.)
