= Holy War (Alicia Keys song) =

Promotional single by Alicia Keys

from the album Here
- Released: October 28, 2016
- Length: 4:22
- Label: RCA
- Songwriters: Alicia Keys; Billy Walsh; Carlo "Illangelo" Montagnese
- Producers: Alicia Keys; Illangelo

Lyric video
- "Holly War" on YouTube

"Holy War" is a song by American singer and songwriter Alicia Keys. The song was released as the promotional single from Keys' sixth studio album Here (2016) through RCA Records on October 28, 2016.

== Background and release ==
In August 2016, Keys presented Best Male Video at the 2016 MTV Video Music Awards, and to mark the anniversary of Martin Luther King Jr.'s "I Have a Dream" speech, Keys recited and sang an accapella part of the song. in an interview with USA Today, Keys explained that:

It's a contemplation of who we are and how we really can choose who we want to be. Do we want to build walls and have all that fear or do we want to break those walls and get to feel someone? You know, we act like things can only be negative. We can absolutely continue to grow and be more accepting and understanding.

After a few live performances of the song in October 2016, Keys released the song for streaming and digital download on October 28, 2016.

== Composition and lyrics ==
"Holy War" is a ballad and lasts for a duration of four minutes and twenty-two seconds. The song uses acoustic guitar and drums as its main instrumentation. The song has been describes as "mostly acoustic" and "acoustically-driven" while the song has also been described as featuring "cavernous beats", "raspy guitar" as well as "dulled" and "thudding Phil Collins-style" drums. Sal cinquemani from Slant wrote that Keys "declares" on the song: “What if sex was holy and war was obscene/And it wasn't twisted,” and noted that "at its core", "Holy War" is a love song. In addition, Keys sings: “Maybe we should love somebody / Maybe we could care a little more / Maybe we could love somebody / Instead of polishing the bombs of holy war”. Describing its composition, Ryan Reed from Rolling Stone wrote that it "quietly builds its minimalist arrangement, incorporating finger snaps, echoing snares and snaking, reversed samples".

According to Allmusic's Andy Kellman, the song discusses "backward societal views of war and sex". Ben Dandridge-Lemco from The Fader described the song as a "guitar-driven ballad about healing the ills of the world". Hilary Hughes from MTV News, described the song as a "free love anthem" and wrote that the song "begs for understanding and compassion to win out over the destructive forces of hate, ignorance, violence, and greed". According to Andy Gill from The Independent, the song "critiqu[es] the separatist urge to build walls". According to Danny Schwartz from HotNewHipHop, the song could be intpreted in two ways, as an "anti-Trump protest song" or as an "apolitical pro-love anthem". He also opined that Keys "beseeches us to give up divisive language and hateful thoughts and embrace our fellow man" on the song. while Maurita Salkey from Revolt wrote that "Keys shares her passion for bringing people together while emphasizing we are all one and no different from one another".

== Critical reception ==
Tom Breihan from Stereogum wrote that the song is a "big, stormy heal-the-world ballad" and "while it's not as entrancing as Keys’ best songs, it's a work of real pop-music professionalism". That Grape Juice wrote that "Keys shows off her oft-praised pipes yet again in this simple, yet stunning arrangement". Nolan Feeney from Entertainment Weekly wrote that the song "makes for one of the album's most spine-chilling performances". Tom Barnes from Mic praised the song and its message, writing that as "the most woke political track of 2016", the song aims to "get our society to face its most uncomfortable internal contradictions", concluding that it's the "most confrontational track Keys has ever released". Maeve McDermott from USA Today highlighted the song, writing that: "The album's final song brings Here's cinematic arc to a close, its hypothetical credits rolling over Keys' smoldering vocals and cinematic chorus likening war, sex and love". In her review of Here, Emily Macay from The Guardian was positive, writing that "Best of all are Holy War, which sorrows over the world's skewed priorities as it showcases the gritty, gut-punch power of Keys's voice at its best". Nick Levine from NME also described keys' vocals as gritty and felt that the song is a "heartfelt plea for tolerance and equality". Ryan Reed from Rolling Stone was also positive, calling the song "soulful" and praising Keys' delivery of the song, writing "Keys explores her dynamic vocal range, from a soft croon to a raspy, full-throated roar". Tom Barnes from Mic commented that the song "offers way more food for thought than it does musical thrills". Writing for Medium, Allison Gauss felt that on the song "Keys poses her most earnest questions with the hard-won self-assurance she brings to the entire album". Michael Gonik from Okayplayer called the song "powerful", adding that it is "aimed at heart" and "like so many of 2016's musical offerings, is poised to heal it". Katie Colombus from The Arts Desk wrote that the song "elicits a sense of being able to turn things around, for the better, substituting love and peace for war and unrest". Reviewing Here for Salon, David Masciotra called the song one of standout tracks on the album, writing that "The profound political commentary of the verses, referring to homophobia, religious violence, terrorism, and ethnic division, is met by the beautiful simplicity of the chorus".

== Live performances ==
Keys performed the song at 2016 Keep a Child Alive Black Ball on October 19, 2016. Keys performed the song during Here in Times Square concert on October 9, 2016. Keys performed the song on The Voice on November 15. Keys was joined onstage by Adam Levine, who played the guitar. Matthew Scott Donnelly from PopCrush wrote that Keys delivered a powerful rendition of the song.

== Charts ==
"Holy War" chart performance
Chart (2016)	Peak position
France (SNEP)	130

== Release history ==
Release history and formats for "Holy War"
Region	Date	Format	Label	Ref.
Finland	October 28, 2016	Digital download	RCA	
France	October 28, 2016	Digital download	RCA	
Various	October 28, 2016	Streaming	RCA	
