= Wrong (Zayn song) =

Single by Zayn featuring Kehlani

from the album Mind of Mine
- Released: 7 June 2016
- Genre: Alternative R&B
- Length: 3:32
- Label: RCA
- Songwriters: Zayn Malik; Kehlani Parrish; Chase Wells; James Griffin; Kevin Rains; James Emerson; Salvador Waviest
- Producer: XYZ

Zayn singles chronology
"Like I Would" (2016)	"Wrong" (2016)	"Cruel" (2016)

Kehlani singles chronology
"24/7" (2016)	"Wrong" (2016)	"CRZY" (2016)

"Wrong" (stylised as "wRoNg") is a song recorded by English singer Zayn featuring American singer Kehlani for his debut solo studio album, Mind of Mine (2016). It was written by Zayn Malik, Wells, Griffin, Rains, Emerson, Waviest and Kehlani Parrish, and produced by XYZ. It was released as a third and final single from the album on 7 June 2016.

== Background ==
Zayn sung and wrote one of the songs, "wRoNg", in collaboration with American R&B singer and songwriter Kehlani. According to Malik, he "reached out to [them], played a couple of songs for [them] in L.A. and [they]'re really cool, [they] liked the music, so [they] got in the studio within a couple of days, [they] gave me a song back that [they] wanted me to do, and we just got it done straight away." Malik originally wrote "wRoNg" as a rap, which he then used to create lyrics for the song. "wRoNg" is about "looking in the wrong place for love". "wRoNg" incorporates elements from early 2000s R&B music.

== Release ==
"wRoNg" was serviced to US rhythmic contemporary radio stations on 7 June 2016 as a single. It later impacted US urban contemporary radio on 28 June 2016.

== Promotion ==
The track was used for ZAYN's GQ magazine photoshoot edition. The video was uploaded to the magazine's official YouTube account.

== Charts ==
Chart (2016)	Peak position
Canada Hot 100 (Billboard)	96
Portugal (AFP)	56
UK Singles (Official Charts Company)	118
UK Hip Hop/R&B (OCC)	23
US Bubbling Under Hot 100 Singles (Billboard)	13

== Release history ==
Region	Date	Format	Label	Version	Ref.
United States	7 June 2016	Rhythmic contemporary	RCA	Original	
United States	28 June 2016	Urban contemporary	RCA	Original	
