= Mind of Mine =

Studio album by Zayn
- Released: 25 March 2016
- Recorded: 2015
- Genres: R&B; alternative R&B
- Length: 45:20
- Label: RCA
- Producers: XYZ; Levi Lennox; MakeYouKnowLove; Malay; Alan Sampson

Zayn chronology
Mind of Mine (2016)	Icarus Falls (2018)

Singles from Mind of Mine
- 1. "Pillowtalk" Released: 29 January 2016; 2. "Like I Would" Released: 10 March 2016; 3. "Wrong" Released: 7 June 2016

Mind of Mine is the first solo studio album by English singer Zayn. It was released on March 25, 2016, through RCA Records, and was released one year after his departure from One Direction. Primarily an R&B and alternative R&B record, the album blends elements from various genres, including pop, folk, dub, soul, funk, electronic, Qawwali, hip hop, reggae, classical and soft rock. Upon release, it was met with generally positive reviews, with praise for Malik's new musical direction and his vocal performance.

Mind of Mine spawned three singles: lead single "Pillowtalk" debuted at number one in twelve countries including the UK and the US. "Like I Would", was released as the next single to moderate success, while "Wrong", featuring Kehlani, was released as the final single. Kehlani is the only feature on the album. Mind of Mine debuted at number one in several countries including the United Kingdom, United States, Australia, Canada, New Zealand, Norway, Portugal, and Sweden, with Malik becoming the first British male artist to debut at number one in both the UK and US with a debut single and debut studio album.

== Background ==
Following Zayn Malik's five-year stint with English-Irish band One Direction, he quit the band after signing off from the band's On the Road Again Tour for an indefinite period six days prior due to stress. Shortly after, Malik began working on solo material. After sessions with various producers, Malik eventually went on to meet James "Malay" Ho, who would become his debut album's main collaborator. On 29 July 2015, Malik shared a photo on social media of his official signing with RCA Records. Throughout the rest of 2015, Malik gave interviews with several music magazines, during which he spoke about his debut solo studio album and revealed part of the track list. He stated "life experiences have been the influences for the album and just stuff that I've been through, especially in the last five years". Furthermore, he explained his reasons for leaving One Direction: "there was never any room for me to experiment creatively in the band." Malik originally auditioned to be a solo R&B singer with Mario's "Let Me Love You" in 2010 before becoming part of One Direction, but with the band headed in a pop rock direction.

Due to the band's musical direction, Malik was unable to sing or write the kind of R&B music he had originally pursued before joining the band. He elaborated, "If I would sing a hook or a verse slightly R&B, or slightly myself, it would always be recorded 50 times until there was a straight version that was pop, generic" and that "Whenever I would suggest something, it was like it didn’t fit us. There was just a general conception that the management already had of what they want for the band, and I just wasn’t convinced with what we were selling. I wasn’t 100 percent behind the music. It wasn’t me. It was music that was already given to us". He told Complex that "It was about denying the authenticity of who I was, and what I enjoyed about music, and why I got into it."

Despite his comments regarding One Direction, he told Ryan Seacrest that he is "massively grateful for that, and if it wasn’t for that, I wouldn’t be here," adding that "It’s not because I’m trying to be more successful or as successful as what was going on before, because there’s no comparison." He told The Fader that "it wasn’t actually about [being the biggest] anymore" but "It was more about the people that I reach. I want to reach them in the right way, and I want them to believe what I’m saying." He added, "I just want to make music now." The cover art, which features a child version of Zayn with tattoos, has been criticized for almost plagiarizing Lil Wayne's Tha Carter album series. Lil Wayne was later featured on the remix of Zayn's song "Pillowtalk".

== Conception and influence ==
In March 2015, Malik was seen at a London recording studio with producer Naughty Boy, leading to speculation of the pair working on music together. Following his departure from One Direction, Malik alluded to the potential of a solo career, with the release of his first solo studio album to be released under the Syco label in 2016. On 31 March 2015, Naughty Boy released on SoundCloud an early demo of Malik's song "I Won't Mind". In June 2015, UK rapper Mic Righteous leaked Malik's "No Type", featuring Mic Righteous and produced by Naughty Boy, a cover version of Rae Sremmurd's hip hop song. With Naughty Boy as his producer, Malik also worked with grime rappers Krept & Konan during this time, recording a song together with an unfinished music video, but the material was never released after Malik parted ways with Naughty Boy. Though unreleased, his work with Naughty Boy and Krept & Konan helped Malik gain a new urban audience in the UK.

He stated musically the record leans towards R&B, and described his album as "weird, alternative R&B", stating that "It's all very sparse and random," and "They're all kind of different thoughts. The music reflects that as well because they're different emotions, so you feel different things through each song." He also said it would incorporate different genres of music, such as soul, reggae, and an R&B-rock fusion, stating that "all the songs are different genres," and that they "don't really fit a specific type of music. They're not like, 'This is funk, this is soul, this is upbeat, this is a dance tune.' Nothing is like that. I don't really know what my style is yet. I'm kind of just showing what my influences are. Depending on what the reaction is, then I'll go somewhere with that."

The album was influenced by the music that Malik grew up with, primarily his father's urban music records, including R&B artists R. Kelly, Usher, Donell Jones, and Prince, rappers Tupac and Biggie, and reggae artists Gregory Isaacs and Yellowman, as well as Bollywood music. He cited rapper Tupac's All Eyez on Me as the album that had the biggest impact on him, stating that it is "so real, and from a perspective of a place where somebody is not afraid to be completely 100 percent honest." He said, "as I grew up, it really helped me to understand that it’s OK to be honest with your art, because people appreciate that." In an interview with NME, Malik explained the album's title: "It's really reflective of the whole experience that I want to give the listener. I wanted it to be almost like a brainstorm. It’s just music and it’s just whatever you’re feeling at that moment in time."

== Writing and recording ==
Teasing what could be expected of his first solo LP, Malik told Billboard: "once they [the fans] hear it, I feel like they will understand me a little bit more. For 10 years, this album has been in my brain, and it's just been there, sat with me, needing to be out." Talking about the recording sessions with Billboard, Malik's main collaborator for the album James "Malay" Ho said they have gone to unusual lengths in pursuit of inspiration, for one "we went camping for a week in the Angeles Forest – set up a generator and a tent so we could track in the woods." James Ho is a Grammy Award winning producer, whose past work includes Frank Ocean's Channel Orange and Big Boi's Sir Lucious Left Foot: The Son of Chico Dusty. "I'll come down here [the recording room] and record maybe seven songs a night," Malik told the magazine. "I’m enjoying what I’m doing. I’m not censoring myself anymore."

Ho described Malik as "pure genius" and noted that most of the vocals were recorded in just a few takes. According to Ho, Malik was heavily involved in every aspect of recording, stating that, "Even if there were co-writers involved, all the direction for the songs and all the lyrics and everything pretty much came from him". The song titles are rendered in a stylised manner, reminiscent of Prince. Malik said the stylized capitalization reflects the way he used to like capitalizing letters when he was at school. Malik said that, after his debut album releases, he plans to pursue an academic degree in English or literature (which he originally intended before his music career), while at the same time working on writing his next album. Malik said that "Pillowtalk" was written about sex, stating that "everybody has sex, and it’s something people wanna hear about. It’s part of everybody’s life, a very big part of life. And you don’t want to sweep it under the carpet." "It's You" was inspired by the breakup of a relationship (possibly from Little Mix's Perrie Edwards), with Malik stating, "It was a form of therapy for me, and it did help me get through" some personal issues, while he was writing it. According to Ho, "Befour" was conceived when he and Malik were in the VIP area of a Las Vegas club where Big Sean was performing in August 2015, and Malik said, "It's crazy being here in Vegas. I’ve literally been all over the world with One Direction. I’ve done this before, but not like this. Not by myself, not this way, not here with the intention of working on my own music".

The Qawwali Urdu song "Flower" was inspired by Malik's upbringing as a British Pakistani Muslim. Referencing the recording, Ho stated that Malik "knows how to sing like that and he’s always been able to do it, but he just never took it that seriously" until one day he "just picked up the mic and tracked that whole thing basically live, in one take." Ho said he "was just blown away" and "didn’t know he could sing like that," and that "he told me he was in a super spiritual place, and that the saying is something one of his family members had told him that had always stuck to him." Ho said the session was like jazz "where a singer will have a concept or a melody and then the rest of it is just improv." Malik sung and wrote one of the songs, "Wrong", in collaboration with American R&B singer and songwriter Kehlani. According to Malik, he "reached out to her, played a couple of songs for her in L.A. and she's really cool, she liked the music, so she got in the studio within a couple of days, she gave me a song back that she wanted me to do, and we just got it done straight away." Malik originally wrote "Wrong" as a rap, which he then used to create lyrics for the song. "Fool for You" is a pop ballad inspired by The Beatles, particularly John Lennon, citing the songs "In My Life" and the Indian-influenced "Lucy in the Sky with Diamonds". Malik sang "Lucozade" in a freestyle manner and recorded the song in one take.

== Composition ==
=== Music ===
Primarily R&B and alternative R&B, the album blends elements from a number of genres, including pop, folk, soul (including British soul and neo-soul), dub, funk, electronic, reggae, Qawwali ghazal, hip hop, classical, and soft rock. The album also channels different eras of music, including modern, retro, 1980s, and 1990s, while the moods of the album vary from slow ballads to thumping club jams. Despite the variations in the sounds and genres, Mind of Mine is structured in an "album-as-complete-work" form, maintaining a tightly knit cohesion throughout the record, with an almost seamless transition between and across songs, while maintaining a recognizable, mostly downbeat, "hazy" tone throughout. This gives the album a continuous flow, and gives the impression that it all came from one person's "mind".

The album largely foregoes radio-friendly "pop bangers" in favour of "sexy, seductive R&B" that focuses on "moods and textures and creating an alluring, provocative vibe", while maintaining an almost seamless cohesiveness throughout the record. The album showcases Malik's vocals, tackling different moods such as smitten, libidinous, and ethereal, and using vocal techniques such as intricately voiced chords and falsettos throughout the album, ornate vocal runs in "Fool for You", vibrato in "It's You", Qawwali singing in "Flower", freestyle singing in "Lucozade" and reggae singing in "Do Something Good". The music production is similarly detailed, complex, and deeply textured, ranging from elaborate synth swirls in "She" to the careful layering of soft-funk guitar lines in "Borderz". There is sonic experimentation present throughout the album, experimenting with elements such as the minimal and moody tones of contemporary R&B, reverberated funk guitar, M83-esque electronics, and soft rock drums and piano.

=== Songs ===
The opening title track "Mind of Mine" involves Malik's voice warbling plaintively through a fog of effects, with his voice drenched in reverb and backed by a piano, and it has some Bollywood music elements. The track seamlessly transitions into the lead single "Pillowtalk". "Pillowtalk" is a downtempo electronic R&B slow jam, leaning towards alternative R&B. "It's You" is a slow R&B intimate ballad that showcases Malik's falsetto as he sings the song's title during the chorus. "Befour" was described by Rolling Stone as "smooth R&B" and NME described it as an "R&B ballad". Music Times said it combines R&B, synthpop, and soul, and AXS said it uses "tribal percussion and ringing synths". AXS calls it an "experimental and assertive slice of R&B" with "personal lyrics addressing his past and detractors all at once." New Statesman says it is "tightly-constructed and slickly-produced" and includes one of Malik's vocal hallmarks, a "long and impossibly high note." Billboard states that "Zayn channels his inner Justin Timberlake" with the song.

"She" is a self-described "party tune" that is "not as intense lyrically" as some of the other cuts. Herald Sun noted its funky groove recalls Timberlake's Justified and Michael Jackson's Off the Wall. It incorporates 1980s synth sounds, and an experimental hip hop outro that blends into the next track, the R&B track "Drunk". "Drunk" incorporates elements from 1990s R&B music. "Flower" is an experimental interlude, in the form of a spiritual, Pakistani ghazal that Malik sings in Urdu, his father's native language, backed by Ho's folk-style acoustic guitar playing and atmospheric sounds resembling a thick mist. Qawwali is a form of devotional Sufi music associated with Islamic culture, and Malik used Indian techniques for the track, including vocal elisions, warbling, and "deeply centered but controlled fervor". "Flower" was influenced by Indian Music, music his father used to play in his home. "Rear View" features electronic loops and warbled synths stacked atop of each other, as Malik's vocals echo throughout the chorus. "Wrong" incorporates elements from early 2000s R&B music.

"Fool for You" is a Beatles-influenced pop ballad, which Malik says was influenced by John Lennon in particular. It is a retro piano ballad, with some electronic elements. "Truth" is an experimental neo-soul track with dub elements, and is mellow and low-key. "Lucozade" is a chorus-less song, lacking a hook, and has Malik singing a set of "stream-of consciousness" verses, in a manner similar to hip hop. Malik sings the verses continuously, almost without pause, like a train of thought, before ending abruptly. The song also utilises 1980s synth sounds. "Blue" uses a classical piece, Johann Sebastian Bach's "Prelude No. 1 in C major", as background music. "Do Something Good" is a reggae song, reminiscent of Bob Marley. "Like I Would" was described by Billboard as a "dancefloor-ready R&B jam" and The Independent described it as "electro-R&B". It incorporates a funky hook, and disco grooves.

=== Lyrics ===
"['Pillowtalk'] is about sex – there is obviously sex in a relationship, though it's not the whole incentive of the song. The actual intent of the song is even though you have great times in a relationship, you have really bad times as well but that's what makes it worthwhile because you learn things and you go through experiences that bring you closer together."

— Zayn in an interview with Elvis Duran and the Morning Show.

The lyrics explore a number of themes, including bliss, desire, frustration, love, lust, and sadness. The songs explore different soundscapes and subject matter, but each song serves a purpose, to establish an aspect of Malik's identity. Rather than being autobiographical, the lyrics focus on moments, sensations and experiences. There is an emphasis on the complexity of human relationships, with love and sexuality being a particular thematic focus for many songs. For love songs, roughly 60% are about falling in love, while roughly 40% are about falling out of love, with the lyrics depicting the subject in a complex "grey" manner. Sexual songs such as "Pillowtalk", "Wrong" and "TiO" forego innuendo in favour of outright sexual boldness.

The title track "Mind of Mine" acts as "a fly-in introduction and a warm welcome to Malik’s mind." "It's You" has self-reflective lyrics, expressing somewhat bitter sentiment, touching on "a love that is pain", and was inspired by the breakup of a relationship. "Befour" addresses both his past and his detractors at the same time, including his past as a working class teenager in Bradford (which the music video is based on), his former band, and the scrutiny of his detractors. "She" features a female protagonist that has not loved or been loved "in the right way". "Drunk" highlights the album's recurring theme of "emotionally labile intoxicated love", which is a common theme in Islamic poetry. The Urdu lyrics of "Flower" is romantic, it translates to "Until the flower of this love has blossomed, this heart won't be at peace, give me your heart". "Rear View" appears to reference his former band but viewing "himself as part of the problem" as he is "tired of looking at himself in the metaphorical rearview" and expresses some doubt. "Wrong" is about "looking in the wrong place for love". "Fool for You" depicts Malik as someone "destined to return to the same woman forever, regardless of how tainted their love becomes." The confessional lyrics of "Truth" appears to reference Malik's former band. "Lucozade" has Malik singing a set of "stream-of consciousness" verses, which include references to the Lucozade energy drink and appear to involve a "Rimbaudian state of poetic derangement" of the senses in order to "tap into" the subconscious. "TiO" uses metaphorical lyrics, such as metaphorical walls built around one's heart.

== Release and promotion ==
In his first solo on-camera interview with Zane Lowe for Apple Music's Beats 1, Malik revealed Mind of Mine as the album's title. The album, which released on 25 March 2016, includes 18 songs whittled down from 46 tracks that Malik wrote. The album's cover-art was revealed on The Tonight Show Starring Jimmy Fallon, on 17 February 2016, where he also premiered the album track "It's You". The cover art, which uses a photo of Malik as a child, drew comparisons to Lil Wayne's album Tha Carter III, which he addressed stating "my ideas have been with me a long time." The album was made available for pre-order on 25 February 2016, along with the digital release of the promotional single "It's You" and its music video – the latter as an Apple Music exclusive. The same day saw the release of "Pillowtalk (Lil Wayne Remix)" featuring American rapper Lil Wayne; it is a hip hop remix, with rapping by Lil Wayne along with rapping and rap-singing by Malik.

The album was released on 25 March 2016, one year since his departure from One Direction. Malik's live preview of several songs from the album set a Periscope record, becoming the biggest Periscope stream by a musician. On 24 March 2016, Malik did his second solo performance on The Tonight Show Starring Jimmy Fallon. On 25 March 2016, he performed on the Honda Stage at the iHeartRadio Theater in New York City. The release party and show was streamed across iHeartMedia contemporary hit radio and rhythmic contemporary radio stations and websites, including iHeartRadio's Honda Stage website. Additionally, Malik graced the covers of several publications including Billboard, Complex and NME, and spoke about the album's recording process, his goals as a solo artist, as well as his artistic frustrations and limitations being in One Direction. He was scheduled to perform at Wembley Stadium in London, England for Capital FM's Summertime Ball on 11 June 2016 and then headline a sold-out concert at the Autism Rocks Arena in Dubai on 7 October 2016, but cancelled on both occasions due to suffering from anxiety.

=== Singles ===
The album's lead single, "Pillowtalk" was released along with its accompanying music video on 29 January 2016, with favourable reviews from music critics. The single debuted at number one on the UK Singles Chart and the US Billboard Hot 100; on the latter, it became the 25th song to debut at number one, making him the first UK artist to debut at number one on the Hot 100 with a first charted single. It also debuted at number one in a number of other countries, including Australia, Canada and Ireland.

The album's second single, "Like I Would" was first released as a promotional single on 10 March 2016. It was listed as one of the best songs of the week by Digital Spy, The Fader, and USA Today. It was serviced to US contemporary hit radio on 24 May 2016.

"Wrong" impacted US rhythmic contemporary radio stations on 7 June 2016 as the third single. The track features guest vocals from American R&B singer Kehlani. It later impacted US urban contemporary radio on 28 June 2016.

=== Promotional singles ===
"It's You" was released as the album's promotional single on 25 February 2016, along with its music video. In the United Kingdom, it debuted at number 48 on the Singles Chart, number 9 on the R&B Chart, and number 2 on the Asian Chart. In the United States, driven primarily by sales, "It's You" debuted at number 59 on the Billboard Hot 100 and number 19 on the Digital Songs chart. It also received favourable reviews from music critics, both for the song — particularly Malik's vocals — and its music video. Stuff said "It's You" is "up there with some of the best R'n'B releases in the last year." The song was also praised by Neil Tennant of the Pet Shop Boys. According to him, "It's the most beautiful record."

The album's second promotional single, "Befour" was released on 17 March 2016. The track was previously used as background music for Zayn Malik's The Fader Cover Star video in November 2015. It was listed as one of the best songs of the week by Entertainment Weekly, NPR, and Rolling Stone. It debuted at number 85 on the UK Singles Chart and number 16 on the UK R&B Chart. Its accompanying music video was released on 25 March 2016. The video was shot in Manchester's Miles Platting district, and dramatises what Malik's working class teenage life was like in Northern England, including scenes at a boxing club (Malik used to do boxing before his music career), restaurant/pool hall, barber shop, parking lot, and fish and chips shop. It reached number 28 on the UK TV Airplay Chart. As of August 2023, the video has received more than 60 million views on YouTube.

== Critical reception ==
Professional ratings
Aggregate scores
Source	Rating
AnyDecentMusic?	6.4/10
Metacritic	69/100
Review scores
Source	Rating
AllMusic	3.5/5 stars
Consequence of Sound	C
Entertainment Weekly	B+
The Guardian	4/5 stars
The Independent	4/5 stars
NME	4/5 stars
Pitchfork	5.9/10
PopMatters	8/10
Spin	6/10
USA Today	3/4 stars

Mind of Mine has received generally positive reviews from music critics. Metacritic indicates "generally positive reviews", with a score of 69 out of 100, based on 21 reviews. Alicia Adejobi of International Business Times rated it 5 out of 5 stars, saying that it demonstrates Malik's strong vocals tackling different moods, slick production, infectious beats, sexually heightened lyrics and "an insight into the singer's soul", concluding that "Malik's foray into r'n'b feels natural". Glenn Gamboa rated it an A grade in Newsday and 4 out of 4 stars in AM New York, saying that "Malik’s brand of R&B bridges the gap" between Frank Ocean, The Weeknd, and Justin Timberlake, but "is clearly Malik’s creation, one that may take him to unexpected new heights" as he "heads off in his own soulful direction." Troy Smith of Cleveland rated the album a B+ grade, stating that Malik has carved "out his own niche, which he accomplishes thanks to cohesive production and a concise vision". Elijah Watson of Pigeons & Planes and Complex said it is "more than" a Timberlake-like "rebrand", but rather "the project displays a Malik that has always been present, but is finally getting the proper introduction he deserves." He praised the album's experimentation, stating that, like Ocean and Miguel, "Malik is pushing into new territory both vocally and sonically." Dan Pardalis of Complex said that, lyrically, it is Malik's "ability to vividly depict the reality of human relationships that asserts his move away from the kids' table." Andrew Milne of musicOMH called it a "genre-blending bedroom confessional" and a "Soulful, sexy and captivating" album that shows "experimentation, honesty, passion" and "Malik's versatility and urge to explore". Sam Richards of NME referred to it as "sexy, credible pop-R&B", comparable to a previous Malay production, Ocean's Channel Orange, while pointing to the "dubby neo-soul" of "Truth" as an example of Zayn developing his own personality, concluding that the album "is sumptuously produced and perfectly sung, with just enough intrigue." Magdalen Jenne of PopMatters said "underneath the wrapping this record is a brilliant, pulsing, living thing."

Andy Gill of The Independent praised the "sublime R&B beats" and particularly Malik's vocals as "by far the album’s most potent aspect, bringing grace and wonder even to the more routine material, and hoisting the better songs to classic status", while viewing the Qawwali-style "Flower" as being culturally relevant in light of recent events, stating that "the brief track’s beauty" has the potential to open people's "hearts to the broader aesthetic possibilities of cultures outside their usual experience." Michael Cuby of Flavorwire described its "album-as-complete-work" form as "impressive" and praised Malik's "impeccably versatile voice" across "delightfully varied" songs, the blend of Miguel's sexuality and Ocean's introspection with his own "clear pop ambition", and the unique "Flower" which "only he could execute properly". Edi Adegbola of Magnate Magazine called it "an accomplished and well-produced piece of slick, provocative, and surprisingly mature alternative R&B", while pointing to the cultural relevance of "Flower" in light of recent events, noting that "inter-cultural unity and solidarity like this are more relevant than ever." Mesfin Fekadu of Spartanburg Herald-Journal expressed surprise that Malik was a former One Direction member because of how different Mind of Mine sounds, stating that it shows "Zayn has some true star quality" and that there "isn't a bad tune" in the album. Lewis Corner of Digital Spy rated it 4 out of 5 stars, stating that "he has genuinely put together a slick debut album that deserves success on its own merit". Richard He of Noisey and Vice gave it a positive review, stating that "Zayn's brand of alternative R&B is carefully curated to exude maximum cool," that it is "a more consistent listen than Bieber's Purpose, or even Beauty Behind the Madness," and that the "songs are masterfully crafted" with each element "in perfect balance - lyrics, melody, production." Desire Thompson of Vibe gave it a positive review, calling it a "pleasurable debut album" where "he's mastered the art of sexual slow jams" and stating that the musical chemistry between Malik and Ho "shines through". Lucas Villa of AXS rated it 4.5 out of 5, calling it "raw, real and refreshingly cool."

Alex Dansereau of Sputnikmusic described it as a "great" album where Malik finds "his own niche inside an already crowded lane" as he "strikes a delicate balance" between "alt-R&B moodiness" and "pop earworms." Maeve McDermott of USA Today rated the album 3 out of 4 stars, praising Malik's "sublime voice" and stating that it "succeeds as a catchy, sexy and fully modern take on contemporary R&B". Bill Brotherton of Boston Herald called it "an ambitious, mature, modern R&B" album and praised Malik's vocals as "smoky, sensual" and "expressive". Christie Goodwin of Milwaukee Journal Sentinel said that "Malik's falsetto has a subtle side not prevalent among Timberlake wannabes," and that "Truth" and "Flower" insinuate "Mind"-expanding possibilities. Ian Drew of Us Weekly rated it 3.5 out of 4 stars, saying it "leaves One Direction in his dust". David Sackllah of Consequence of Sound compared it to Timberlake's Justified, and thought Zayn "falls short." Alan Raible of ABC News rated it 3.5 out of 5 stars, saying it is "much more compelling than anything his former band ever issued." Music Times gave it a positive review, with Jon Niles saying it reminds him of early Weeknd mixtapes and has "lasting appeal", while Ryan Middleton said it "is an impressive solo effort." Tim Sendra of AllMusic wrote that "the sound of the album is rich and layered with synths, rubbery basslines, and occasional electric guitars" and that "he digs deeply into slow, sensual ballads and basically buries himself there like it was a big, fluffy blanket perfect for a midnight rendezvous" while also commenting that "while the songs are mostly strong and it all sounds very slick and state of the art, the highlight is Zayn's voice" and that "it's a treat to hear him on his own, with nobody else hogging the spotlight", ending the review by calling the album "an impressive debut". Leah Greenblatt of Entertainment Weekly rated the album a B+, noting that many tracks "conspicuously echo Ocean’s Californiacool ennui" while adding that "he doesn’t sound particularly interested in pushing pop’s boundaries or dissecting the vagaries of his own fame". Michael Cragg of The Guardian opined that "the sound he’s chosen – clipped beats, hazy production flourishes, oodles of falsetto as a shortcut for emotional honesty – is basically 2016 writ large may seem bandwagon-jumping, but there’s more than enough good stuff here to suggest it’s been created with love rather than with an eye on ticking boxes".

Some reviews were less positive, with Brittany Spanos of Rolling Stone praising Malik's range and vocals, the immersive production, and unique experimental tracks such as the neo-soul "Truth" and hypnotic intermission "Flower", but criticizing the album's overtly sexual lyrics. Brad Nelsen of Pitchfork, however was less complimentary about the album, noting that it "lacked compelling hooks, a unifying mood, or a clear narrative". Alexa Camp of Slant gave it a mixed review, praising Malik's vocals and the music production, but criticizing the lyrics as "pleasure-obsessed, vaguely misogynist, and largely disposable." Andrew Unterberger, writing for Spin, noted that the album "never sounds less than great", but that Malik doesn't "give us much reason to care about that Mind of His" and that the songs are "lacking in narrative".

=== Year-end lists ===
It was featured on multiple magazines and critics year end list of best record/album. Digital Spy listed it at number 2 on its list, while Newsday ranked it at number 16.

== Commercial performance ==
In the United Kingdom, Mind of Mine debuted at number one on the UK Albums Chart, with 22,250 copies sold, replacing Adele's 25 at the summit. The album set a UK streaming record, as the highest-streamed debut for a British male act. In its second week, it fell to number nine on the albums chart, selling 7,733 copies, and fell to number three on the album streaming chart. Overseas, the album entered at number one in New Zealand and Australia, making him the 26th English male solo artist to top the Australian Albums Chart. In France, it debuted at number three on the albums chart and number one on the albums download chart. The record also opened at number one on the Canadian Albums Chart with first week sales of 11,000 copies in the country. As a result, Zayn became the first artist since Yoan to enter at Canada's summit with a debut album.

In the United States, Mind of Mine debuted at number one on the Billboard 200, shifting 157,000 album-equivalent units (including album sales, equivalent track sales, and equivalent streams), including 112,000 pure album sales and 40.8 million streams, one of the highest weekly streaming figures for an album. Malik became the first British male solo artist to debut at number one with his first album, the first British male solo artist to reach number one with his first album since George Michael's Faith in 1988 (which debuted at number 41 and took nine weeks to reach number one), the first UK act to debut at number one with their first album since his former group One Direction's Up All Night (on the chart dated 31 March 2012), and the first UK act to debut at number one with their first album on both the Billboard 200 and the UK Albums Chart since Susan Boyle's I Dreamed a Dream in 2009. Malik is also one of a number of artists that have achieved number one both as part of a group and as a solo act, the first British male artist to debut at number one in both the UK and US, and the third artist to debut at number one on both the Billboard 200 and Billboard Hot 100 with debut entries on each chart (along with Lauryn Hill and Clay Aiken). The album release propelled Malik to number one on the Billboard Artist 100 chart, replacing Justin Bieber at the summit, and surpassing One Direction's number-two peak on the chart. Mind of Mine subsequently sold 44,000 units the following week, and 31,000 units the week after, hence selling a total of 232,000 copies in the first three weeks.

Mind of Mine set an iTunes record, becoming the first debut album to top the daily iTunes charts in more than 70 countries, having topped the daily iTunes charts of 84 countries within 24 hours of release. Mind of Mine also set a Twitter record, as the first album to top the Billboard Twitter Top Tracks chart for three straight weeks with three consecutive songs: "It's You", "Like I Would" and "Befour".

== Track listing ==
Mind of Mine – Standard edition
No.	Title	Writer(s)	Producer(s)	Length
1.	"Mind of Mind (Intro)"	Zayn Malik; Chase Wells; James Griffin; Kevin Rains; James Emerson; Salvador Waviest	XYZ	0:57
2.	"Pillowtalk"	Malik; Levi Lennox; Anthony Hannides; Michael Hannides	Lennox; MakeYouKnowLove^{[a]}^{[b]}	3:22
3.	"It's You"	Malik; James Ho; Harold Lilly	Malay	3:46
4.	"Befour"	Malik; Ho; Lilly; Terrence Smith	Malay	3:28
5.	"She"	Malik; A. Hannides; M. Hannides; Alan Sampson	MakeYouKnowLove; Alan Sampson	3:09
6.	"Drunk"	Malik; A. Hannides; M. Hannides; Sampson; Smith	Sampson; MakeYouKnowLove^{[c]}	3:25
7.	"Intermission: Flower"	Malik; Ho	Malay	1:44
8.	"Rear View"	Malik; Ho; Lilly	Malay	3:21
9.	"Wrong" (featuring Kehlani)	Malik; Kehlani Parrish; Wells; Griffin; Rains; Emerson; Waviest	XYZ	3:32
10.	"Fool for You"	Malik; Wells; Griffin; Rains; Emerson; Waviest	XYZ	3:22
11.	"Bordersz"	Malik; Ho; Lilly; A. Hannides; M. Hannides	Malay	3:59
12.	"Truth"	Malik; Ho; Wells; Griffin; Rains; Emerson; Waviest	Malay; XYZ	4:05
13.	"Lucozade"	Malik; Wells; Griffin; Rains; Emerson; Waviest	XYZ	4:12
14.	"TIO"	Malik; A. Hannides; M. Hannides; Herbie Crichlow	Make You Know Love	2:58
Total length:				45:20

Mind of Mine – Deluxe edition
No.	Title	Writer(s)	Producer(s)	Length
15.	"Blue"	Malik; Ho; Lilly; Johann Sebastian Bach	Malay	3:44
16.	"Bright"	Malik; Ho; Lilly	Malay	2:56
17.	"Like I Would"	Malik; Wells; Griffin; Rains; Emerson; Waviest	XYZ	3:12
18.	"She Don't Love Me"	Malik; Wells; Griffin; Rains; Emerson; Waviest; Smith	XYZ	4:15
Total length:				59:27

Mind of Mine – Target edition – Bol.com Limited edition
No.	Title	Writer(s)	Producer(s)	Length
19.	"Do Something Good"	Malik; Ho; Lilly	Malay	3:51
20.	"Golden"	Malik; Wells; Griffin; Rains; Emerson; Waviest	XYZ	3:14
Total length:				66:32

Mind of Mine – Japanese edition
No.	Title	Writer(s)	Producer(s)	Length
21.	"Pillowtalk" (The Living Room Session)	Malik; Lennox; A. Hannides; M. Hannides; Garrett	Lennox; MakeYouKnowLove^{[a]}^{[b]}	2:25
Total length:				68:57

=== Notes ===
- All of the standard edition tracks are stylized in alternating caps (with the exception of "Pillowtalk", which is stylized in all caps). For example, "Befour" is stylized as "BeFoUr". The deluxe edition tracks are stylized in all caps. For example, "Like I Would" is stylized as "LIKE I WOULD". On the back cover of the physical releases of the album, "Pillowtalk" is stylized as "PiLlOwT4lK".
- "TIO" is an acronym for "Take It Off".
- "Blue" contains an interpolation of "Prelude in C Major", composed by Johann Sebastian Bach.
- ^{^[a]} signifies an additional producer.
- ^{^[b]} signifies a vocal producer.
- ^{^[c]} signifies a co-producer.

== Personnel ==
Musicians

- Zayn – vocals
- Chase Wells – keyboards, programming (tracks 1, 9, 10, 13, 17, 18); guitar (13, 17, 18)
- James Emerson – keyboards, programming (1, 9, 10, 13, 17, 18); guitar (13, 17, 18)
- Salvador Waviest – keyboards, programming (1, 9, 10, 13, 17, 18); guitar (13, 17, 18)
- Kevin Rains – keyboards, programming (1, 9, 10, 13, 17, 18)
- James Griffin – keyboards (1, 9, 10, 13), programming (1, 9, 10, 13, 18)
- Anthony Hannides – background vocals (2)
- Mike Hannides – background vocals (2, 6), drums (5, 14); bass guitar, piano (5)
- Joe Garrett – guitar (2, 5)
- Levi Lennox – piano (2)
- Malay – bass guitar, guitar, keyboards, programming (3, 4, 7, 8, 11, 12, 15, 16); triangle (3)
- Dave Eggar – cello, orchestration (3)
- Chuck Palmer – conductor, orchestration (3)
- Katie Kresek – violin (3)
- Rachel Golub – violin (3)
- MakeYouKnowLove – background vocals (5)
- Alan Sampson – bass guitar, drums, piano (5)
- Harold Lilly – background vocals (8, 16)
- Al Carty – bass guitar (10)
- Louise Dearsley – cello (10)
- Questlove – drums (10)
- Brian London – piano (10)
- Steve Wright – strings (10)
- Katherine Chibah – viola (10)
- Reiad Chibah – violin (10)
- Sarah Button – violin (10)
- Elliott Skinner – background vocals (15)
- Couros Sheibani – keyboards, programming (17)

Technical

- Anthony Kilhoffer – mixing (1, 9, 10, 13, 18)
- Serban Ghenea – mixing (2, 5, 6, 14, 17)
- Manny Marroquin – mixing (3, 4, 7, 8, 11, 12, 16)
- Malay – mixing (15), engineering (4, 12, 15, 16)
- Daniel Zaidenstadt – engineering (1, 5, 7, 9, 10, 14, 15)
- Henrique Andrade – engineering (1, 9, 17, 18)
- John Hanes – engineering (2, 5, 6, 14, 17)
- Zeke Mishanec – engineering (5, 9, 10)
- David Phelan – engineering (6)
- Salvador Waviest – engineering (9, 17, 18)
- Ryan Gladieux – engineering (9)
- Daniel Moyler – engineering (10)
- James Emerson – engineering (10)
- Jason Goldstein – engineering (10)
- Paul Norris – engineering (10)
- Sean Kellett – engineering (10)
- Steve Mandel – engineering (10)
- Liam Nolan – engineering (12)
- Chris Galland – engineering assistance (3, 4, 7, 8, 11, 12, 16)
- Ike Schultz – engineering assistance (3, 4, 7, 8, 11, 12, 16)
- Rob Katz – engineering assistance (4)
- Bradford H. Smith – engineering assistance (5)
- Frank Tatick – engineering assistance (5, 9, 10)
- Kyle Resto – engineering assistance (5, 9, 10)
- Alex Layne – engineering assistance (9, 17, 18)
- Kyle Ross – engineering assistance (9, 10, 13, 18)
- Robert Marcus – engineering assistance (9, 10, 13, 18)
- Jake Smith – engineering assistance (10)
- Jay Abdul – engineering assistance (10, 12)
- Robin Florent – engineering assistance (12)

== Charts ==
=== Weekly charts ===
Chart (2016)	Peak position
Australian Albums (ARIA)	1
Austrian Albums (Ö3 Austria)	2
Belgian Albums (Ultratop Flanders)	8
Belgian Albums (Ultratop Wallonia)	5
Brazilian Albums (ABPD)	2
Canadian Albums (Billboard)	1
Croatian International Albums (HDU)	10
Czech Albums (ČNS IFPI)	16
Danish Albums (Hitlisten)	9
Dutch Albums (Album Top 100)	3
Finnish Albums (Suomen virallinen lista)	3
French Albums (SNEP)	3
German Albums (Offizielle Top 100)	9
Greek Albums (IFPI)	22
Hungarian Albums (MAHASZ)	14
Irish Albums (IRMA)	2
Italian Albums (FIMI)	2
Japanese Albums (Oricon)	29
Mexican Albums (AMPROFON)	1
New Zealand Albums (RMNZ)	1
Norwegian Albums (VG-lista)	1
Polish Albums (ZPAV)	2
Portuguese Albums (AFP)	1
Scottish Albums (Official Charts)	3
South Korean Albums (Gaon)	40
Spanish Albums (Promusicae)	2
Swedish Albums (Sverigetopplistan)	1
Swiss Albums (Schweizer Hitparade)	5
UK Albums (Official Charts)	1
UK R&B Albums (Official Charts)	1
US Billboard 200	1

=== Monthly charts ===
Chart (2016)	Peak position
Argentine Monthly Albums (CAPIF)	1

=== Year-end charts ===
Chart (2016)	Position
Australian Albums (ARIA)	84
Belgian Albums (Ultratop Flanders)	175
Belgian Albums (Ultratop Wallonia)	143
Danish Albums (Hitlisten)	95
Dutch Albums (MegaCharts)	87
French Albums (SNEP)	151
Italian Albums (FIMI)	67
Mexican Albums (AMPROFON)	47
Spanish Albums (PROMUSICAE)	90
Swedish Albums (Sverigetopplistan)	59
US Billboard 200	56

== Certifications and sales ==
Region	Certification	Certified units/sales
Brazil (Pro-Música Brasil)	2× Platinum	80,000^{‡}
Canada (Music Canada)	Platinum	80,000^{‡}
Denmark (IFPI Danmark)	Platinum	20,000^{‡}
France (SNEP)	Gold	50,000^{‡}
Italy (FIMI)	Gold	25,000^{‡}
Mexico (AMPROFON)	Platinum	60,000^{‡}
New Zealand (RMNZ)	Platinum	15,000^{‡}
Poland (ZPAV)	Platinum	20,000^{‡}
United Kingdom (BPI)	Gold	100,000^{‡}
United States (RIAA)	Platinum	1,000,000^{‡}
^{‡} Sales+streaming figures based on certification alone.

== Release history ==
List of release date(s), format(s), label(s), edition(s) and reference(s)
Date	Format(s)	Label	Edition(s)	Ref.
25 March 2016	CD; digital download	RCA	Standard; deluxe	
25 October 2016	Vinyl	RCA	Standard; deluxe	
