= It's You (Zayn song) =

Promotional single by Zayn

from the album Mind of Mine
- Released: 25 February 2016
- Genre: R&B
- Length: 3:46
- Label: RCA
- Songwriters: Zayn Malik; James Ho; Harold Lilly
- Producer: Malay

"It's You" (stylised as "iT's YoU") is a song recorded by English singer-songwriter Zayn from his debut solo studio album Mind of Mine (2016). It was written by Zayn, James Ho and Harold Lilly, whilst production was handled by Malay. Zayn debuted the track with a live performance during his appearance on the Tonight Show with Jimmy Fallon on 18 February 2016. It was later premiered on Beats 1 Radio on 25 February 2016, and ultimately was released as the first promotional single from the album on 25 February 2016 along with the album's pre-order on iTunes.

A slow-paced, intimate R&B ballad, "It's You" features organ-like keyboards, pulsating beats and sparingly employed strings, piano, and electric guitar through its instrumentation. Lyrically, the song talks about a break-up, where the protagonist is desperate for answers on a failed relationship. Considered an album highlight by various reviewers, several critics additionally believed that the inspiration behind the track was Zayn's relationship with former girlfriend Perrie Edwards. "It's You" charted moderately around the world, including in the United Kingdom, Scotland, and the United States. The accompanying music video for the song was released on 26 February 2016 exclusively on the Apple Store and later on 28 March 2016.

== Background and release ==
Soon after his departure from the British-Irish band One Direction, Zayn started working on his debut solo studio album; months later, on 22 July 2015, it was announced that Zayn was recording new music with record producer Malay Ho, after the producer posted a photo with the singer on his Instagram account. Malik's management team reached out to him because Zayn was a fan of his work with artists such as John Legend, Alicia Keys and Frank Ocean. Later, Ho heard "Pillowtalk" and "Fool for You" before signing on to produce the record, and thought Malik's voice was "incredible" and agreed to work with him. The two recorded most of the songs in the Studio Suite at the Palms Casino Resort, inside Malik's Beverly Hills Hotel room, and in the middle of the woods. As recalled by Ho, the work had a "super creative, super free" atmosphere. Zayn admitted that "He’s just an amazing person. Like from the second I met him I just knew he was kind of different. He looks into every instrument in high detail and he understands how to break it down."

One of the songs they worked together, "It's You", was said to be one of the album's centerpiece, with Malik commenting: "I just felt like I needed to put myself out there, just because it was a form of therapy for me and it did help me get through some shit. If I can help someone else at that time, that’s cool." Dan Hyman from Pitchfork stated that the song shared similarities with Ocean's "Bad Religion", with Ho mentioning that after hearing the song live and Zayn's fans noting similarities between both songs, he found them similar with the organ. "It's You" premiered during Zane Lowe's Beats One Radio on 25 February 2016, and a day later, 26 February 2016, it was released as the first promotional single from Zayn's debut solo studio album Mind of Mine (2016), along with the pre-order of the album on the iTunes Store.

== Composition and lyrics ==
"It's You" was written by Malik, James Ho and Harold Lilly, and produced by Malay. Malay was also responsible for guitar, programming, keyboards, bass and triangle. String arrangement and orchestration were provided by Dave Eggar and Chuck Palmer, while Eggar played the cello and Palmer acted as the track's conductor. Additionally, violins were performed by Katie Kresek and Rachel Golub. It was recorded at two studios: the Larabee Studios in North Hollywood and Germano Studios in New York City. According to the sheet music published at Musicnotes.com by EMI Music Publishing, it is written in the key of F major with a tempo of 63 beats per minute in common time. The song follows a chord progression of F – B♭m6/D♭ – F/6 –Am/C, and Malik's vocals span from C_{4} to D♭_{6}. It is a slow-burning, intimate R&B ballad with a "dreamy, ambient" synth, organ-like keyboards, pulsating beats and sparingly employed strings, piano, and electric guitar. During the track, Zayn uses pained vocals, while during its chorus he uses his falsetto.

Lyrically, the song talks about a heartbreak, as a girl is playing with the protagonist heart's, he's being used and his feelings are being thrown to the side. The song opens with Zayn singing, "She got, she got, she got/Her own reason for talking to me/She don't, she don't, she don't/Give a f**k/About what I need," before continuing: "Tell me your lies/Because I just can't face it." In the chorus, he repeats: "It's you, it's you, it's you," showing that he "can't seem to fight his feelings about th[e] girl being 'the one,' but "also referring to the loss of that love he is dealing with based off of [sic] her and her decisions within their relationship." Several critics believed that the song was written about Zayn's break-up with former fiancée Perrie Edwards.

== Critical reception ==
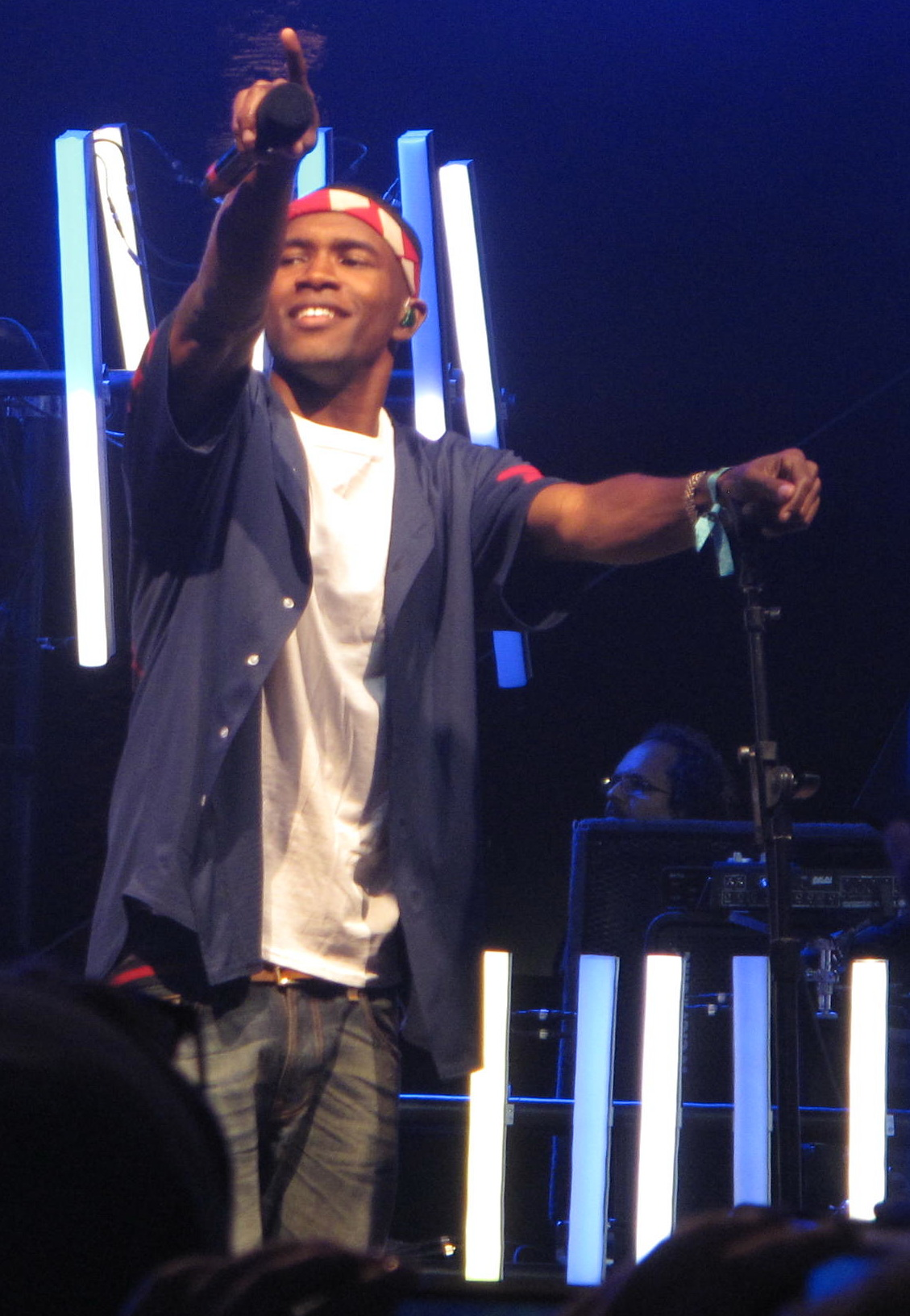
The song was compared to Frank Ocean's "Bad Religion".

"It's You" was well-received by several music critics. Tim Sendra of AllMusic picked the track as one of the album's highlights, noting that "his soaring falsetto on 'iT's YoU' is breathtaking." Zach Frydenlund of Complex called it an emotional ballad that "showcas[es] his tremendous vocal abilities, which weren't on display like this previously." Andy Gill of The Independent was also complimentary of his vocals and selected it as one of the tracks to download, writing that "the drawn-out, melismatic title hook of 'It's You' soars over the organ drone and piano." Alexa Camp of Slant Magazine praised the "Malik's surprisingly mournful vocals on the haunting" song. Amy Davidson, writing for Digital Spy, named it "a slice of slick R&B," observing that "the stripped back production lets his airy falsetto come through nicely, and the whole thing sits as perfectly stylised as his glorious quiff." Lewis Corner of the same publication opined that, "It's the most vulnerable Zayn sounds on the entire record, while his spire-scaling 'oooohs' are poignantly doleful." Kate Solomon of Drowned in Sound was also positive to what she called "his dreamy falsetto underpinned by a melancholy organ line and coupled madly with Top Gun guitars and Disney film strings." Jon Caramanica of The New York Times described it as "an elegant whisper of a love song, part mellow soul burner and part post-Coldplay melancholia."

Christina Lee, an editor for Idolator, noticed that the song "sounds like Zayn asked 'Channel Orange' producer Malay for his own version of Frank Ocean's 'Bad Religion,' though it suffers because his writing and singing aren't nearly as gripping." Sam Richards of NME agreed, noting that "the beginning of ‘It’s You’ sounds like that album's 'Bad Religion', with its melancholy jazz chords and confessional vocals – though it's debatable how much Zayn is ready to confess." Michael Cragg of The Guardian also saw similarities, expressing that "Zayn "showcases his Frank Ocean-esque falsetto on the sad-eyed, organ-drenched [track]." Mikael Wood of Los Angeles Times also perceived influences of Ocean. Sarah Murphy of Exclaim! thought that the track worked for showing a "more mature content and a sleeker, less bubblegum-y pop sound" and credited Malay for the feat. Spin's Andrew Unterberger also praised the producer for "serving up most of the LP's highlights," which included "the lightly quaking Beach House gauze" song. He also praised Zayn's voice for "floating like a paper airplane above the tremors." On the other hand, Brittany Spanos of Rolling Stone called it a "tepid ballad."

== Chart performance ==
After being released as a promotional single, "It's You" charted in several countries around the world. In the United Kingdom, it peaked at number 48 on the official UK Singles Chart, and at number 9 on the R&B component chart. In Australia, France, and Sweden, it spent one week on their respective charts, where it debuted at numbers 38, 65, and 97, respectively. According to Billboard, "It's You" was the most mentioned song on Twitter for the week ended 19 March 2016, where it topped the Billboard Twitter Real-Time chart, in addition to peaking at number 59 on the Billboard Hot 100. Furthermore, the track peaked in Scotland, Canada, and Ireland at positions 30, 71, and 74, respectively.

== Music video ==
The music video for the song was directed by Ryan Hope and released on 26 February 2016 exclusively on the Apple Store. The black-and-white video finds the singer in a pensive state, with scenes shot in slow motion. In the beginning, Malik is first seen alone inside a home while his video co-star Nicola Peltz is outside enjoying the pool. Later, Malik sits at a piano. As the video progresses, "the object of his affection is seen with another man at a cocktail party while Malik looks on. It culminates with Malik watching through a window as his former love drives away," as explained by Rolling Stone's Althea Legaspi. Eventually, the video was uploaded on his Vevo account on YouTube on 28 March 2016.

Julia of 2Day FM called it a "stunning", "ridiculously hot" and a "black and white masterpiece." Kat Boehrer of Complex named it a "mesmerizing video." The Capital FM website published that the video is "a moody, atmospheric piece of art that is almost guaranteed to make you fall in love with the singer." Jackson McHenry of Vulture.com called it "a more melancholy-look love."

== Live performances ==
Zayn made his solo live debut on television with a live performance of "It's You" during his appearance on the Tonight Show with Jimmy Fallon on 18 February 2016. "It's You" was also part of his setlist at the 2016 Wango Tango. An additional live rendition occurred during the Honda Stage at the iHeartRadio Theater in New York City, New York.

== Credits and personnel ==
Recording

- Recorded at Larabee Studios, North Hollywood, California; Germano Studios, New York City.
- Mixed at Larabee Studios, North Hollywood, California.

Personnel

- Zayn – vocals, writing
- James "Malay" Ho – writing, production, guitar, programming, keyboards, bass and triangle
- Harold Lilly – writing
- Dave Eggar – string arrangement, orchestration, cello
- Chuck Palmer – string arrangement, orchestration, conductor
- Katie Kresek – violins
- Rachel Golub – violins
- Manny Marroquin – mixing
- Chris Galland – assistant engineer
- Ike Schultz – assistant engineer

Credits adapted from the liner notes of Mind of Mine, RCA Records.

== Charts ==
Chart (2016)	Peak position
Australia (ARIA)	38
Canada Hot 100 (Billboard)	71
France (SNEP)	65
Ireland (IRMA)	74
Italy (FIMI)	95
Portugal (AFP)	49
Scottish Singles Sales (Official Charts)	30
South Korea International Chart (Gaon)	50
Sweden (Sverigetopplistan)	97
UK Singles (Official Charts)	48
UK Hip Hop/R&B (Official Charts)	9
US Billboard Hot 100	59
US Digital Song Sales (Billboard)	19
