= Here (Alicia Keys album) =

Studio album by Alicia Keys
- Released: November 4, 2016
- Recorded: 2014
- Studios: Jungle City; Oven (New York City)
- Genres: R&B; soul; pop; hip-hop
- Length: 46:04
- Label: RCA
- Producers: Alicia Keys; Mark Batson; Swizz Beatz; Illangelo; Jimmy Napes; Pharrell Williams

Alicia Keys chronology
Girl on Fire (2012)	Here (2016)	Alicia (2020)

Singles from Here
- 1. "In Common" Released: May 4, 2016; 2. "Blended Family (What You Do for Love)" Released: October 7, 2016

Here is the sixth studio album by American singer and songwriter Alicia Keys. It was released on November 4, 2016, by RCA Records. Keys recorded the album in 2014 at the New York–based Jungle City Studios and Oven Studios with producers Mark Batson, Swizz Beatz, Illangelo, Jimmy Napes, and Pharrell Williams. ASAP Rocky is the album's only guest appearance. The singer had finished writing and recording material for the album before she found out she was pregnant, which put the record's release on hold.

Here received positive reviews from critics, who applauded the raw and urgent quality of the music and its exploration of social struggles and African-American life. It debuted at number two on the US Billboard 200 and became Keys' seventh album to top the Top R&B/Hip-Hop Albums chart. By May 2017, it had sold 131,000 copies worldwide. The album produced two singles–"In Common", included only on the international editions, and "Blended Family (What You Do for Love)".

== Background and development ==
Here was Keys' first album in four years, following Girl on Fire (2012). Keys said that she was not planning a hiatus, but after she finished recording material for the album, she found out she was pregnant which "put a different time spin on things". On September 8, 2014, Keys uploaded the music video to a new song called "We Are Here" to her Facebook page, accompanied by a lengthy status update describing her motivation and inspiration to write the song. It was released digitally the following week. Keys was also working with Pharrell Williams on then-untitled Here, first set for a 2015 release. In an interview with Vibe, Keys described the sound of the album as "aggressive", as one of the songs on the album was titled "Killing Your Mother" (later retitled "Kill Your Mama").

Keys also played the piano on a Diplo-produced song "Living for Love" which was featured on Madonna's thirteenth studio album Rebel Heart (2015). In November 2014, Keys announced that she would be releasing a series of children's books; the first book released was entitled Blue Moon: From the Journals of MaMa Mae and LeeLee. Keys gave birth to her second child, son Genesis Ali Dean, on December 27, 2014. In June 2015, Keys performed at the BET Awards 2015 with The Weeknd. Keys played the character Skye Summers in the second season of Empire, first appearing in the episode "Sinned Against", which aired on November 25.

== Recording and production ==
Keys recorded Here in sessions at Jungle City Studios and Oven Studios in New York. She spoke of the creative process for the album in an interview with Citizens of Humanity magazine:

"The music for this album was created so fast—the fastest I've ever created music before. It was like raining down every night, like storms of music was just coming out. It was crazy because I never experienced creating like that; I came in already knowing what I wanted to start to talk about. I knew the topics that I wanted to address and I knew who I wanted to assemble to help me create this very powerful sonic and lyrical journey. So everything I did was with so much intention that when the music began it made sense that it just came so fast. We did probably 30 songs in like 10 days."

== Release and promotion ==
The lead single "In Common" was performed by Keys at Tribeca Film Festival on April 21, 2016, on the May 7 episode of the comedy sketch show Saturday Night Live, The Voice season finale on May 17, at the UEFA Champions League Final in Milan on May 28, BET Awards 2016 on June 26, and the 2016 Democratic National Convention in Philadelphia, Pennsylvania on July 26. Keys appeared on Today on September 3, 2016. On September 20, Keys performed at the Apple Music Festival in Roundhouse, London. Here was made available for pre-order on October 7, the same day the second single "Blended Family (What You Do for Love)" was released. On October 9, Keys headed the concert special Here in Times Square, featuring performances of album tracks and previous songs with several guest artists in New York City's Times Square; the special was broadcast by BET on November 3. Here was released the following day by RCA Records. "In Common" was included only on editions outside North America as a bonus track, and was excluded from the vinyl edition as well.

== Critical reception ==
Professional ratings
Aggregate scores
Source	Rating
AnyDecentMusic?	7.3/10
Metacritic	76/100
Review scores
Source	Rating
AllMusic	2.5/5 stars
Consequence	B−
Entertainment Weekly	B+
The Guardian	4/5 stars
The Independent	4/5 stars
The Irish Times	4/5 stars
NME	4/5 stars
Pitchfork	6.5/10
Rolling Stone	3.5/5 stars
Vice (Expert Witness)	A−

Here was met with generally positive reviews from critics. At Metacritic, which assigns a normalized rating out of 100 to reviews from mainstream publications, the album received an average score of 76, based on 14 reviews.

Reviewing Here for The Independent, Andy Gill praised Keys' writing and musicality, regarding it to be "grounded in a melodic appeal that’s almost magnetic." In Vice, Robert Christgau hailed the album as Keys' best record since her debut Songs in A Minor, deeming it "simultaneously raw and political", and crediting Swizz Beatz for defining "the funk her adventures in gospel grit demand, evoking Memphis thump while remaining so hip-hop that the samples stay in Nas-Wu-Tribe territory". The Wall Street Journal's Jim Fusilli credited the singer for pursuing new and less-commercial sounds without discarding her classic-soul forte, and Rolling Stone journalist Keith Harris said she exhibited more cruder R&B rather than the classical piano influences of her past work while suggesting a "hectic but coherent" atmosphere evocative of New York City, with influences from boom bap, Latin music, and 1970s soul. Entertainment Weekly writer Nolan Feeney said Keys performed with a "fire in her voice and an almost rap-like cadence", the urgency and subject matter of which made the album her "most vital release in years — and a welcome addition to 2016's rich canon of albums ... that address black life in America. Nick Levine from NME praised Keys' "looser and more youthful" approach, and appreciated that she "doesn't shy away from the personal here" while also looking outwards in explorations of social struggles. According to Ludovic Hunter-Tilney of the Financial Times, Here was animated by "politically active music" such as Sam Cooke's 1964 Civil Rights anthem "A Change Is Gonna Come", and suggested that Keys' "powerful vocals carry the memory of Lauryn Hill in her prime."

Some reviewers were less enthusiastic. Andy Kellman of AllMusic observed energy and conviction in Keys' performance, and a number of "career standouts" in "She Don't Really Care_1 Luv" and "Blended Family". He ultimately found the album's music hastily made, "hollow", and "crude", however, attributing this to "Keys' invigorated energy level and need to simply expel ideas, rather than refine them". Vanessa Okoth-Obbo from Pitchfork applauded the singer's musical experimentation and range, but found the lyrics unadventurous and objected to her "inhabiting the personae of multiple characters" at the expense of personal revelation; in Okoth-Obbo's opinion, the album "does little to further our understanding of who Keys is".

=== Accolades ===
Year	Award	Category	Nominee(s)	Result	Ref.
2017	NAACP Image Award	Outstanding Female Artist	Alicia Keys	Nominated	
2017	NAACP Image Award	Outstanding Music Video	"In Common"	Nominated	
2017	NAACP Image Award	Outstanding Duo, Group or Collaboration	"Blended Family (What You Do for Love)"	Nominated	

== Commercial performance ==
Here debuted at number two on the US Billboard 200 with 50,000 album-equivalent units, of which 42,000 were pure album sales. It topped the US Top R&B/Hip-Hop Albums on November 26, 2016, becoming Keys' seventh number-one album on the chart. By May 2017, the album had sold 131,000 copies worldwide.

Internationally, Here became Keys' least commercially successful studio album to that point, reaching the top ten only in Canada and Switzerland, peaking at numbers ten and five, respectively. However, it peaked within the top 20 in almost all countries it charted in. In the United Kingdom, it peaked at number 21 on the UK Albums Chart but became Keys' fourth number-one album on the UK R&B Albums.

== Track listing ==
North American and vinyl edition
No.	Title	Writer(s)	Producer(s)	Length
1.	"The Beginning" (Interlude)	Alicia Keys	Alicia Keys	1:04
2.	"The Gospel"	Keys; Mark Batson; Kasseem Dean; Shawn Martin; Robert Diggs; Jason Hunter; Corey Woods	Keys; Batson; Swizz Beatz; DJ Silent Assassin	3:01
3.	"Pawn It All"	Keys; Batson; Dean; Harold Lilly	Keys; Batson; Beatz	3:10
4.	"Elaine Brown" (Interlude)	Keys	Keys	0:50
5.	"Kill Your Mama"	Keys; Emeli Sandé	Keys	2:40
6.	"She Don't Really Care_1 Luv"	Keys; Dean; Tyrone Johnson; Edwin Birdsong; Kamaal Fareed; Ali Shaheed Muhammad; William Allen; Roy Ayers; Walter Booker; Charles Stepney; DJ Silent Assassin	Keys; Swizz Beatz; Johnson	6:07
7.	"Elevate" (Interlude)	Keys	Keys	0:48
8.	"Illusion of Bliss"	Keys; Batson; Dean; Lilly	Keys; Batson; Swizz Beatz	5:23
9.	"Blended Family (What You Do for Love)" (featuring ASAP Rocky)	Keys; Latisha Hyman; Dave Kuncio; Rakim Mayers; Brandon Aly; Edie Brickell; John Bush; John Houser; Kenneth Withrow	Keys; Batson	3:31
10.	"Work on It"	Keys; Pharrell Williams	Keys; Williams	3:34
11.	"Cocoa Butter" (Cross & Pic Interlude)	Keys	Keys	0:59
12.	"Girl Can't Be Herself"	Keys; Batson; Lilly; Martin	Keys; Batson	2:39
13.	"You Glow" (Interlude)	Keys	Keys	0:25
14.	"More Than We Know"	Keys; Hyman; Batson; Lilly; Martin	Keys; Batson	4:35
15.	"Where Do We Begin Now"	Keys; Batson; Lilly	Keys; Batson	2:47
16.	"Holy War"	Keys; Billy Walsh; Carlo Montagnese	Keys; Illangelo	4:22
Total length:				46:04

International edition
No.	Title	Writer(s)	Producer(s)	Length
17.	"Hallelujah"	Keys; Jimmy Napes	Keys; Napes	3:09
18.	"In Common"	Keys; Taylor Parks; Montagnese; Walsh	Illangelo	3:29
Total length:				52:43

Japanese edition
No.	Title	Writer(s)	Producer(s)	Length
19.	"In Common" (Black Coffee remix)	Keys; Montagnese; Parks; Walsh	Illangelo; Black Coffee	4:58
20.	"In Common" (Kaskade remix)	Keys; Montagnese; Parks; Walsh	Illangelo; Kaskade	4:22
Total length:				62:03

=== Sample credits ===
- "The Gospel" contains a sample of "Shaolin Brew", written by Robert Diggs, Jason Hunter and Corey Woods.
- "She Don't Really Care" contains a sample of "Bonita Applebum", written by Edwin Birdsong, Kamaal Fareed, Ali Shaheed Muhammad, William Henry Allen, Roy Ayers, Walter Booker and Charles Stepney.
- "1 Luv" contains a sample of "One Love", written by Nas and Jimmy Heath.
- "Blended Family (What You Do for Love)" contains a sample of "What I Am", written by Brandon Aly, Edie Brickell, John Bush, John Houser, and Kenneth Withrow.

== Personnel ==
Credits were adapted from the liner notes.

=== Musicians ===
- Alicia Keys – arranger, concept, drum programming, executive producer, Fender Rhodes, keyboards, Moog bass, piano, producer, vocals, vocal arrangement, vocal producer, background vocals
- Roy Ayers – vibraphone, background vocals (6)
- Mark Batson – drum programming, keyboards, producer
- Tish Hyman – background vocals (9)
- Illangelo – instrumentation, mixing, producer
- Dave Kuncio – guitar (9)
- Harold Lilly – drum programming, background vocals
- MusicManTy – bass, drum programming
- ASAP Rocky – vocals
- Pharrell Williams – drum programming, producer

=== Artwork ===
- Meghan Foley – art direction, design
- Erwin Gorostiza – creative direction
- Arthur Johnson – videography
- Paola Kudacki – photography
- Earle Sebastian – creative direction

=== Production ===
- Alicia Keys – production, executive production
- Swizz Beatz – production, executive production
- Mark Batson – production
- The Il'luminaries – production
- Erika Rose – executive production
- Mike Larson – engineering
- Ken Lewis – engineering
- Ann Mincieli – engineering, mixing
- Zeke Mishanec – vocal engineering
- Tony Maserati – mixing
- Val Brathwaite – assistance, mixing assistance, project assistance
- John Cranfield – mixing assistance
- Justin Hergett – mixing assistance
- Sean Klein – assistance, mixing assistance
- Brendan Morawski – assistance, mixing assistance, project assistance
- Ramon Rivas – assistance, mixing assistance, project assistance, videography
- Tyler Scott – mixing assistance
- David Kutch – mastering
- Kevin Peterson – mastering assistance
- Kez Khou – project assistance
- Jon Schacter – assistance
- Eric Eylands – assistance

== Charts ==
=== Weekly charts ===
Chart (2016)	Peak position
Australian Albums (ARIA)	14
Austrian Albums (Ö3 Austria)	22
Belgian Albums (Ultratop Flanders)	12
Belgian Albums (Ultratop Wallonia)	22
Canadian Albums (Billboard)	10
Dutch Albums (Album Top 100)	12
French Albums (SNEP)	20
German Albums (Offizielle Top 100)	14
Irish Albums (IRMA)	27
Italian Albums (FIMI)	14
New Zealand Albums (RMNZ)	24
Norwegian Albums (VG-lista)	16
Polish Albums (ZPAV)	13
Portuguese Albums (AFP)	15
Scottish Albums (Official Charts)	39
Spanish Albums (Promusicae)	15
Swedish Albums (Sverigetopplistan)	21
South Korean Albums (Gaon)	34
South Korean International Albums (Gaon)	2
Swiss Albums (Schweizer Hitparade)	5
UK Albums (Official Charts)	21
UK R&B Albums (Official Charts)	1
US Billboard 200	2
US Top R&B/Hip-Hop Albums (Billboard)	1

=== Year-end charts ===
Chart (2016)	Position
US Top R&B/Hip-Hop Albums (Billboard)	67

Chart (2017)	Position
US Top R&B/Hip-Hop Albums (Billboard)	96

== Certifications ==
Region	Certification	Certified units/sales
Poland (ZPAV)	Gold	10,000^{‡}
^{‡} Sales+streaming figures based on certification alone.

== Release history ==
List of release dates and formats
Region	Date	Format(s)	Label(s)	Ref.
Various	November 4, 2016	CD; digital download; streaming	RCA	
Japan	November 30, 2016	CD	Sony Music	
Various	January 27, 2017	Vinyl	RCA	

== See also ==
- List of Billboard number-one R&B/hip-hop albums of 2016
- List of UK R&B Albums Chart number ones of 2016
