= Befour (song) =

Promotional single by Zayn

from the album Mind of Mine
- Released: 17 March 2016
- Recorded: August 2015
- Genre: R&B; synth-pop
- Length: 3:28
- Label: RCA
- Songwriters: Zayn Malik; James Ho; Harold Lilly; Terrence "Scar" Smith
- Producer: Malay

"Befour" (stylised as "BeFoUr") is a song recorded by English singer-songwriter Zayn for his debut solo studio album, Mind of Mine (2016). It was written by Zayn Malik, James Ho, Harold Lilly and Terrence "Scar" Smith, and produced by Malay. It was released as the third promotional single from the album on 17 March 2016 by RCA Records. "Befour" is a smooth R&B and synth-pop song, which incorporates musical elements of disco and soul music. It features four-on-the-floor beats, mellow synths, and a grinding guitar loop in its instrumentation. The song is also noted for Malik's high-reaching falsetto during the song's middle eight section.

Lyrically, the song talks about the story of a man who has finally broken out on his own, and also addresses critics of his career with his former band One Direction, and how he felt frustrated and suffocated during the time he was with the band. The song's music video was released on 25 March 2016 (same day as the album's release), and it focuses on youth culture around the North of England, splitting scenes between Malik hanging with friends to images of young people boxing, drinking and dancing.

== Background and release ==
Prior to his departure from the band One Direction, Zayn Malik started working on his debut solo album. Initially, he was seen in the studio with UK producer Naughty Boy, however there had a public falling-out later and parted ways. Shortly after, Malik's management team reached out to record producer Malay Ho because Zayn was a fan of his work with artists such as John Legend, Alicia Keys and Frank Ocean. Later, on 22 July 2015, it was announced that Zayn was recording new music with the producer, after he posted a photo with the singer on his Instagram account. The producer first heard "Pillowtalk" and "Fool for You" before accepting to produce for the album, and after being impressed by Malik's vocals, he accepted.

"Befour" is among the tracks they worked together for the album, and was conceived in August 2015, when Malik, Malay, and a group of friends were partying at Drai's, a club overlooking the Las Vegas strip. As they were watching American rapper Big Sean performing, "[they] were sitting backstage in a VIP area and [Malik] was just telling [Malay], ‘It’s crazy being here in Vegas. I’ve literally been all over the world with One Direction. I’ve done this before, but not like this. Not by myself, not this way, not here with the intention of working on my own music.’" Malay later encouraged Malik to continue the thought and claimed that the phrase "I’ve done this before, but not like this" was already lines of the song. Therefore, they went into the studio the same night and started creating the song. The producer continued: "He was in the booth singing melodies and we just stuck with those lyrics, and that was the foundation. We took it back to L.A. and did some more writing and working on it but the song was literally almost done when we left Vegas that night."

"Befour" was first previewed in the behind-the-scenes video for Zayn's Fader cover in November 2015. During the session, he showed a few tracks, and claimed: "I don’t feel like people really know what I’m going to give them, musically. And once they hear it, I feel like they will understand me a little bit more, and they’ll understand why I did what I did, and why I left the band, and why I had to write this shit down. Because for five—not even for five years, for ten years, this album has been in my brain, and it’s just been there, sat with me, needing to be out." Later, on 17 March 2016, "Befour" was released as the third promotional single from the album, being instantly available to fans who pre-order the album on iTunes in advance of the album's release, on 25 March 2016.

== Composition and lyrics ==
"Befour" was written by Zayn Malik, James Ho, Harold Lilly and Terrence "Scar" Smith. It was produced by Malay, who was also responsible for guitar, programming, recording, keyboard and bass. It was recorded at Larabee Studios, North Hollywood, California, and at Germano Studios, New York City. "Befour" is a smooth R&B and synth-pop song, which incorporates musical elements of disco and soul music. It features four-on-the-floor beats, mellow synths, and a grinding guitar loop in its instrumentation. During the middle eight section, Zayn provides a high-reaching falsetto run. Lyrically, the song tells the story of a man who has finally broken out on his own. In the chorus, Zayn sings, "So say what you wanna say, what you want / Shame is you won’t say that to my face," which made critics believe that the song also addresses critics of his career with his former band One Direction, and possibly the band itself, due to its title, "Befour", which includes the number four, which is also the current number of the band members. "Time for me to move up / So many hours have gone / Heart beats the pump of my blood / No strings for you to pull on / You've got your tongue in your cheek / So pardon if I don't speak," he sings in the song's second verse. The lines "No strings for you to pull on… can’t tune my chords into your song" was interpreted as "[h]is frustration with the suffocating One Direction regime."

== Critical reception ==
Billboard's Erin Strecker thought that Zayn "channels his inner Justin Timberlake" on the track, which according to him, "it wouldn't be a stretch to assume this is Zayn's musical response to a year of rumors, in fighting, and big changes with his former boy band." Similarly, Tim Sendra of AllMusic, defined it as "a nice midtempo disco-influenced track that sounds like something Justin Timberlake might have done at one point." Brittany Spanos, writing for Rolling Stone praised his falsetto, noting that it "hark[s] back to his memorable contributions to One Direction songs like 'You & I'." Robbie Daw of Idolator declared that the song was "easily the best of the bunch, to-date, and it has Zayn coming off as he should at this point: Like a true Pop Star." Maeve McDermott of USA Today agreed, enjoying "its shadowy beats and Miguel-channeling vocals deliver like nothing we've heard from him before. Added bonus: some classic Zayn falsetto." Leah Greenblatt of Entertainment Weekly picked it as one of the album's best tracks, defining it as a "disco-kissed venture into light-fantastic funk."

Alexa Camp of Slant Magazine declared that the "production is the star on 'BeFour,' on which Malik's supple falsetto rides a smooth, sleek groove." Lewis Corner of Digital Spy opined about its lyrics, claiming that they are "direct, but calm and collected just like his real-life demeanour." Kate Solomon of Drowned in Sound simply called it a "grower", while Mikael Wood, writing for Los Angeles Times found inspiration on Prince, noting that "it's perceived on "Zayn's falsetto to his stylized renderings of song titles." Michael Cragg of The Guardian noticed that "'Befour''s pulsating electro-throb there’s a head-spinning vocal performance you don’t tend to get from a former boyband members." Andrew Unterberger of Spin gave praise to Malay's production on the track, calling it a "highlight", stating: "There’s no reason why 'BeFoUr' — with a tension more palpable and cinematic than anything on Beauty Behind the Madness, and a narrative hook of maybe being about Malik’s old 1D mates — shouldn’t be one of the most vivid pop songs of the year, his 'Cry Me a River' or even his 'How Do You Sleep?'."

== Music video ==
The song's accompanying music video was released on 25 March 2016. The video was directed by Ryan Hope, shot in Manchester's Miles Platting district, and dramatises what Malik's working class teenage life was like in Northern England. It includes scenes at a boxing club, where Malik used to do boxing before his music career, restaurant/pool hall, barber shop, parking lot, and a fish and chips shop.

== Credits and personnel ==
Recording

- Recorded at Larabee Studios, North Hollywood, California; Germano Studios, New York City.
- Mixed at Larabee Studios, North Hollywood, California.

Personnel

- Zayn – vocals, writing
- James "Malay" Ho – bass, guitar, keyboards, production, programming, recording
- Harold Lilly – writing
- Terrence "Scar" Smith – writing
- Manny Marroquin – mixing
- Chris Galland – mixing assistant
- Ike Schultz – mixing assistant
- Rob Katz – recording

Credits adapted from the liner notes of Mind of Mine, RCA Records.

== Charts ==
Weekly chart performance for "Befour"
Chart (2016)	Peak position
Australia (ARIA)	86
Canada Hot 100 (Billboard)	61
France (SNEP)	164
Italy (FIMI)	98
Portugal (AFP)	51
Scottish Singles Sales (Official Charts)	74
Sweden Heatseeker (Sverigetopplistan)	7
UK Singles (Official Charts)	85
UK Asian (OCC)	2
UK Hip Hop/R&B (Official Charts)	16
US Bubbling Under Hot 100 (Billboard)	4

== Certifications ==
Certifications and sales for "Befour"
Region	Certification	Certified units/sales
Brazil (Pro-Música Brasil)	Gold	30,000^{‡}
^{‡} Sales+streaming figures based on certification alone.
