= We Gotta Pray =

Promotional single by Alicia Keys
- Released: December 3, 2014
- Genre: R&B
- Length: 3:02
- Label: RCA
- Songwriter: Alicia Keys

Music video
- We Gotta Pray on YouTube

"We Gotta Pray" is a song recorded by American recording artist Alicia Keys. A piano ballad, the song is regarded as Keys' response to the police brutality controversies, namely the killings of Eric Garner and Michael Brown, that have caused nationwide protests in the United States.

== Background ==
Keys was one of the many artists who, by releasing a song publicly, reacted to the grand jury decision not to indict the police officer responsible for the death of Eric Garner. Although released the same night the no-indictment decision was announced, the song was written months earlier. In an interview with The New York Times, Keys stated that she was inspired to write the song after being moved by the death of Michael Brown in Ferguson.

The song was posted on Keys' YouTube account on December 3, 2014. Keys later tweeted that "I wrote #WeGottaPray awhile ago, yet the lyrics have never meant more to me than during this time".

== Composition ==
"We Gotta Pray" is a three-minute ballad and is driven by "a single sparse piano accompaniment". In the song, Keys sings "Violence everywhere, barely holding on, what the hell going on, do you know who you are". Additionally, Keys sings about sirens and violence being everywhere.

Andrew R. Chow of The New York Times described the composition as having a "hymnal quality" that the song features "declarations of uplift and self-affirmation" such as “We are extraordinary people / Living ordinary lives”. Justin Davis of Complex wrote that "We Gotta Pray" is a song that "brings attention to the troubling social issues we live in today". As described by Vibe, Keys encourages to "keep the faith and continue on a righteous path in life" and "spreads the message of prayer to the world". Billboard compared it to Keys' previous single "We Are Here", and noted that it is another "socially conscious" ballad from the singer.

== Video ==
The video for the song consists of various pictures of protestors and quotes from prominent civil rights activists.
