= Blended Family (What You Do for Love) =

Single by Alicia Keys featuring ASAP Rocky

from the album Here
- Released: October 7, 2016
- Studio: Oven (New York, NY); Jungle City (New York, NY)
- Genre: R&B
- Length: 3:32
- Label: RCA
- Songwriters: Alicia Keys; Latisha Hyman; Dave Kuncio; Rakim Mayers; Brandon Aly; Edie Brickell; John Bush; John Houser; Kenneth Withrow
- Producers: Alicia Keys; Mark Batson

Alicia Keys singles chronology
"Back to Life" (2016)	"Blended Family (What You Do for Love)" (2016)	"Us" (2018)

ASAP Rocky singles chronology
"Lovesick" (2016)	"Blended Family (What You Do for Love)" (2016)	"Raf" (2017)

Music video
- "Blended Family" on YouTube

"Blended Family (What You Do for Love)" is a song by American recording artist Alicia Keys, featuring vocals from rapper ASAP Rocky. It was written by Keys, Rocky, John Bush, Brandon Aly, Tish Hyman, Dave Kuncio, John Houser, Kenneth Withrow and Edie Brickell for her sixth studio album Here (2016), while production was helmed by Keys and Mark Batson. The song refers to the former marriage of Keys' husband Swizz Beatz and musician Mashonda Tifrere. It was released on October 7, 2016 by RCA Records.

== Background and release ==
The song is inspired by family and in particular the themes are those of adoption and extended families. Keys was inspired by her family composed of her husband Swizz Beatz, their two sons Egypt Daoud Dean and Genesis Ali Dean, and Beatz's son Kasseem Dean Jr from his previous marriage with Mashonda Tifrere. Keys, following the controversy that arose due to the alleged dating of the singer-songwriter with Beatz, dedicated the song to Tifrere, writing:

«The understanding, compassion and support we’ve found is a powerful testament to the healing that comes when we choose love. Especially for the kids … the most important part of our lives. Celebrating Mashonda for our commitment to each other with support and true growth»

== Critical reception ==
Nina Corcoran from Consequence of Sound wrote that "It’s an uplifting song" and "an ode to inclusion at large as well as her own multiracial marriage" while being "the only radio-styled hit on the album". According to Nolan Feeney from Entertainment Weekly, the song is a "love letter to her step-children that touches on her time in the tabloids" and named the song one of the key tracks on the album Allison Gauss from Medium wrote that the song is driven by an "authentic story", adding that "the intimate details in the verses make you believe the song in a way generalizations never could". Reviewing Here for Salon, David Masciotra wrote that the song is a "beautiful and infectious blend of hip hop and soulful pop" and opined that the song, discusses "how “love can bring us closer than blood” when divorce, single motherhood, death, and remarriage created families out of the present parts".

== Music video ==
The music video, filmed in black-and-white, was released on November 11, 2016, and features both Keys and ASAP Rocky. In September 2017 it was revealed on IMDb that the video was directed by Hype Williams.

== Track listing ==
Digital download
No.	Title	Length
1.	"Blended Family (What You Do For Love)" (featuring ASAP Rocky)	3:32

== Charts ==
=== Weekly charts ===
Chart (2016)	Peak position
Belgium Urban (Ultratop Flanders)	41
France (SNEP)	62
New Zealand Heatseekers (Recorded Music NZ)	9
Japan Hot 100 (Billboard)	52
Scottish Singles Sales (Official Charts)	79
South Korea International (Gaon)	60
Switzerland (Schweizer Hitparade)	85
UK Hip Hop/R&B (Official Charts)	22
US Adult R&B Songs (Billboard)	9

=== Year-end charts ===
Chart (2017)	Position
US Adult R&B Songs (Billboard)	42

== Release history ==
Region	Date	Format	Label	Ref.
Various	October 7, 2016	Digital download	RCA	
Italy	October 14, 2016	Contemporary hit radio	Sony	
United States	November 15, 2016	Rhythmic contemporary	RCA	
United States	November 15, 2016	Contemporary hit radio	RCA	
