= In Common =

Single by Alicia Keys

from the album Here
- Released: May 4, 2016
- Studio: Record Plant (Los Angeles, CA); Oven (New York, NY); Jungle City (New York, NY)
- Genre: Tropical; dancehall; Latin
- Length: 3:29
- Label: RCA
- Songwriters: Alicia Keys; Illangelo; Taylor Parks; Billy Walsh
- Producer: Illangelo

Alicia Keys singles chronology
"28 Thousand Days" (2015)	"In Common" (2016)	"Back to Life" (2016)

Music video
- "In Common" on YouTube

"In Common" is a song by American singer and songwriter Alicia Keys from her sixth studio album, Here (2016). The song was written by Keys, Illangelo, Billy Walsh and Taylor Parks, and produced by Illangelo. It is a departure from her R&B sound, having a tropical music and dancehall sound, with Latin beat, Afrobeat instrumental, collage of electronic beats, tropicalia-infused rhythms and icy drum patterns as its main instrumentation. Keys uses a hushed tone throughout the song.

The song's accompanying music video was shot in black-and-white and released on May 20, 2016. It features Keys grooving on a fire escape alongside dancers of all ages and races. Keys gave the first televised performance of the track on Saturday Night Live and later at the UEFA Champions League Final. The song is solely available on the deluxe edition of Here.

== Background and release ==
After the success of her fifth studio album, Girl on Fire (2012), Alicia Keys took a break and in 2014 announced she was expecting her second child with husband Swizz Beatz. In September 2014, Keys released "We Are Here", a song about social justice that at the time was announced as the lead-single of her upcoming sixth studio album by Billboard. In the same year, Keys confirmed production by her husband, producer Swizz Beatz, and Pharrell Williams, revealing the album was almost done. However, in July 2015, Keys released "28 Thousand Days", a song that she dedicated to her husband and that was released to Levi's ad campaign. In an interview for Vogue magazine, in late 2015, Keys revealed that the album would only be released in early 2016. After teasing new music in April, and performing it at the 2016 Tribeca Film Festival in the same month, the singer released "In Common" on May 4, 2016. It was simultaneously released to digital download on iTunes, Google Play and Amazon, and streaming on Spotify, as well as YouTube.

== Composition ==
"In Common" was written by Alicia Keys, Carlo "Illangelo" Montagnese, Taylor Parks and Billy Walsh, and produced by Illangelo. The song is heavily influenced by tropical music, as well as dancehall, having a Latin beat. It is also marked by clipped phrasing over a minimal beat with trendy Caribbean vibes, Afrobeat instrumental and icy drum patterns. The instrumentation also features collage of electronic beats and tropicalia-infused rhythms. Its sounds were compared to Rihanna's "Work", Drake's "One Dance", as well as their duet on Drake's "Take Care" - songs heavily influenced by dancehall. Keys uses a hushed tone during the lines, "We used to talk 'til midnight/All those days that you stayed at my house/We were just passing the time/When we were young and we ain't had no vows." A writer of the website American Top 40 compared her vocal styling to that of Dawn Richard. During the chorus, she sings: "If you could love somebody like me, you must be messed up too." Lyrically, "In Common" talks about the similarities between two lovers, with the lyrics "paint[ing] a picture of a couple who mirror one another in ways never before experienced with past lovers."

== Critical reception ==
Brittany Spanos of Rolling Stone called it a "hypnotic, catchy single." A writer of Fact described it as a "chart-ready polish, hitting the sweet spot between Jamie xx's bass-heavy pop and the post-Popcaan trend for featherlight dancehall a la Bieber, Drake and Rihanna." Jessica Goodman of Entertainment Weekly named it a "hazy and club-ready [track]." Rachel Sonis of Idolator opined that the song is "subtle but infectious. It shows off the 35-year-old singer’s vocal restraint and still manages to keep things light and feisty." Lewis Corner of Digital Spy was also positive, noting that it is "a pretty decent effort" [...] subtly infectious with its tropical electronics and buoyant beats." Katie Rife of The A.V. Club praised its tropical vibe, saying that it "suggest[s] you’ll be hearing this song on outdoor patios and mall PAs alike this summer." Rife also compared Keys to Rihanna and Ellie Goulding, a sentiment echoed by Maeve McDermott of USA Today, who noted that "the singer's new look sounds good on her," calling it "a song clearly positioned for a big summer." Jamieson Cox of The Verge labelled it "humid and subdued, and Keys turns in a vocal take that impresses with subtlety rather than firepower." Sal Cinquemani of Slant Magazine was very positive, writing: "With its sensual, forward-minded production and more mature themes, the song recalls Keys's under-appreciated 2009 single 'Try Sleeping with a Broken Heart.'"

Pitchfork would later list "In Common" on their ranking of the 100 best songs of 2016 at number 87:

If you follow Alicia Keys on Instagram, you already know she’s drawn to Nigerian pop acts like Wizkid and Davido, part of the ascendant Afrobeats sound. Part UK funky, part soca, part dancehall, part soda pop bubble, this Nigerian/Ghanaian hybrid became the sound of the year, so it made sense that Ms. Keys and producer Illangelo wove those vibrant tropical patterns into “In Common.” It's a rare, welcome instance of Keys moving out of her musical comfort zone and riding the humid groove, and she took it all the way to the DNC stage. It would have been easy enough to pair that genre's bubbling rhythm with a lyrical bauble, but Keys instead twists the love song trope of “opposites attract.” “If you could love somebody like me/You must be messed up too” simultaneously indicts and embraces the dysfunction, insecurity, and maddening laws of attraction that undergird modern love.

== Music video ==
On May 20, 2016 Keys uploaded the music video for "In Common" on her YouTube and Vevo account. The music video was directed by Pierre Debusschere and Keeley Gould. The video of the single was shot in black-and-white and, as stated by Dylan Kickham of Entertainment Weekly, "[it] features various dancers freestyling contortionist body movements in front of a bare, grey backdrop, with only a few urban mainstays (a fire escape, a chain link fence, a fire hydrant) as props. As the video progresses into the song’s bridge, the dancers form into couples who embrace each other, echoing the song’s loving sentiments. Afterwards, the video erupts into an all-out dance party." In a statement, Keys wrote about the video: "This video is about celebrating our individuality, and how in the brilliance of our uniqueness, the magic of it all is at the core, we are all the same. We want the same things. We all want to experience love, the freedom to be our truest selves, to love whomever we want and to be accepted and celebrated for all of our nuances and so called imperfections that make us, us."

== Live performances ==
"In Common" was performed for the first time at Tribeca Film Festival on April 21, 2016. Keys performed the song for the first time live on television on Saturday Night Live episode of May 7, 2016, along with a new track, "Hallelujah". For "In Common", she "delivered a simmering, sensual rendition of the song bolstered by a locked-in backing band," as described by Daniel Kreps of Rolling Stone. Dennis Perkins of The A.V. Club added that she was "standing in silhouette at her piano on the darkened stage," while praising her "striking stage presence." On May 17, 2016, Keys also appeared on The Voice finale to perform the track. She performed the song at the UEFA Champions League Final in Milan on May 28, 2016. She performed the song at BET Awards 2016 on June 26, 2016 and later at the 2016 Democratic National Convention in Philadelphia, Pennsylvania on July 26, 2016. A remix of the song is performed alongside a cover Crystal Water’s Gypsy Woman as part of The Alicia + Keys World Tour.

== Track listings ==
- Digital download
1. "In Common" – 3:29
- Digital EP (The Remixes)
1. "In Common" (Lil Silva Remix) – 3:52
2. "In Common" (Xpect Remix) – 4:29
3. "In Common" (Kenny Dope Remix) – 3:33
4. "In Common" (Kenny Dope Extended Remix) – 6:37
5. "In Common" (Black Coffee Remix) – 4:58
- Digital download
1. "In Common" (Kaskade Radio Mix) – 3:17
- Digital download
1. "In Common" (Kaskade Remix) – 4:22
- Digital download
1. "In Common" (J Farell Remix) – 3:40
- Audiomack download
1. "In Common" (ZEE Calvin Remix) – 2:26

== Credits and personnel ==
Credits adapted from Tidal.

- Alicia Keys — vocals, composer, lyricist
- Carlo "Illangelo" Montagnese — composer, lyricist, producer, mixing engineer
- Billy Walsh — composer, lyricist
- Taylor Parks — composer, lyricist

== Charts ==
=== Weekly charts ===
Chart (2016)	Peak position
Belgium (Ultratip Bubbling Under Flanders)	23
Belgium Urban (Ultratop Flanders)	17
France (SNEP)	76
Iceland (RÚV)	14
Netherlands (Dutch Top 40 Tipparade)	13
Romania (Airplay 100)	56
Scottish Singles Sales (Official Charts)	51
South Africa Airplay (EMA)	1
Sweden (Sverigetopplistan)	100
UK Singles (Official Charts)	89
UK Hip Hop/R&B (Official Charts)	20
US Bubbling Under Hot 100 (Billboard)	4
US Adult R&B Songs (Billboard)	4
US Dance Club Songs (Billboard)	1
US Dance Airplay (Billboard)	28
US Hot R&B/Hip-Hop Songs (Billboard)	42
US R&B/Hip-Hop Airplay (Billboard)	19
US Rhythmic Airplay (Billboard)	38

=== Year-end charts ===
Chart (2016)	Position
US Adult R&B Songs (Billboard)	15
US Hot Dance Club Songs (Billboard)	3

== Certifications ==
Region	Certification	Certified units/sales
United States (RIAA)	Gold	500,000^{‡}
^{‡} Sales+streaming figures based on certification alone.

== Release history ==
Region	Date	Format	Version	Label	Ref.
Various	May 4, 2016	Digital download	Original	RCA Records	
United States	May 10, 2016	Urban AC; Urban contemporary	Original	RCA Records	
Various	May 23, 2016	Digital download	J Farell Remix	RCA Records	
United States	May 24, 2016	Rhythmic contemporary	Original	RCA Records	
Various	July 1, 2016	Digital download	Remixes EP	RCA Records	
Various	July 12, 2016	Digital download	Kaskade remix	RCA Records	
Various	July 12, 2016	Digital download	Kaskade Radio Mix	RCA Records	
Various	August 6, 2016	Digital download	ZEE Calvin Remix	RCA Records	
