= Harold Lilly (songwriter) =

American singer-songwriter

Harold Lilly Jr.
- Born: Harold Spencer Lilly Jr.
- Genre: R&B
- Occupation: Songwriter
- Label: Lillyluv

Harold Spencer Lilly Jr. (born December 1977) is an American songwriter from Richmond, Virginia. He has written songs for artists such as Alicia Keys, Beyoncé, Brandy, Zayn Malik, Angie Stone and Luther Vandross.

== Awards ==
Year	Nominee / work	Award	Result
2008	Harold Lilly	Heroes and Legends Award	Won

== List of songs ==
†	Indicates single release

List of songs written or co-written by Harold Lilly
Year	Song	Artist(s)	Release	Ref.
2001	"Take You Out"	Luther Vandross	Luther Vandross	
2001	"Girl"	O-Town	O-Town	
2001	"Brotha"	Angie Stone	Mahogany Soul	
2001	"Easier Said Than Done"	Angie Stone	Mahogany Soul	
2001	"Brotha Part II"	Angie Stone	Mahogany Soul	
2001	"Do Your Time"	Faith Evans	Faithfully	
2001	"Heaven Only Knows"	Faith Evans	Faithfully	
2002	"He Is" †	Brandy	Full Moon	
2002	"2 Steps Back"	Craig David	Slicker Than Your Average	
2002	"Just a Friend 2002"	Mario	Mario	
2002	"Braid My Hair"	Mario	Mario	
2002	"Too Hood"	Monica	All Eyez on Me	
2002	"Im Back"	Monica	All Eyez on Me	
2002	"U Should've Known"	Monica	All Eyez on Me	
2002	"U Deserve"	Monica	All Eyez on Me	
2002	"If U Were the Girl"	Monica	All Eyez on Me	
2002	"Searchin"	Monica	All Eyez on Me	
2003	"You Don't Know My Name" †	Alicia Keys	The Diary of Alicia Keys	
2003	"So Simple"	Alicia Keys	The Diary of Alicia Keys	
2003	"No Ruben"	Ruben Studdard	Soulful	
2003	"Take the Shot"	Ruben Studdard	Soulful	
2003	"Can I Get Your Attention"	Ruben Studdard	Soulful	
2003	"Don't Quit On Me"	Ruben Studdard	Soulful	
2004	"I Want You" †	Janet Jackson	Damita Jo	
2004	"Get No Better"	Cassidy	Split Personality	
2004	"L.O.V.E."	Christina Milian	It's About Time	
2004	"My Man"	Angie Stone	Stone Love	
2004	"That Kind of Love"	Angie Stone	Stone Love	
2004	"Talk About Our Love" †	Brandy featuring Kanye West	Afrodisiac	
2004	"Where You Wanna Be"	Brandy featuring T.I.	Afrodisiac	
2004	"Baby Mama"	Fantasia Barrino	Free Yourself	
2004	"Directions"	Mario	Turning Point	
2004	"Girl I Need"	Mario	Turning Point	
2004	"Nikes Fresh Out the Bo"	Mario	Turning Point	
2005	"Ain't No Reason"	Christina Milian	Be Cool	
2005	"Gotta Make It" †	Trey Songz featuring Twista	I Gotta Make It	
2005	"Midnite"	Toni Braxton	Libra	
2005	"Unbreakable" †	Alicia Keys	Unplugged	
2005	"You Don't Know My Name"	Alicia Keys	Unplugged	
2005	"Unpredictable"	Jamie Foxx	Unpredictable	
2005	"Three Letter Word"	Jamie Foxx	Unpredictable	
2005	"More"	Syleena Johnson featuring Anthony Hamilton	Chapter 3: The Flesh	
2006	"Got You Home"	Luther Vandross	The Ultimate Luther Vandross	
2006	"Sunshine"	Fantasia	Fantasia	
2006	"The Return" (of The Velvet Teddy Bear)	Ruben Studdard	The Return	
2006	"Our Story"	Ruben Studdard	The Return	
2006	"One Side"	Ruben Studdard	The Return	
2006	"Ain't No Party"	Ruben Studdard	The Return	
2006	"Listen to Ya Heart"	Ruben Studdard	The Return	
2006	"I'm Not Happy"	Ruben Studdard	The Return	
2007	"I Need You"	Alicia Keys	As I Am	
2007	"Where Do We Go from Here"	Alicia Keys	As I Am	
2007	"Wreckless Love"	Alicia Keys	As I Am	
2007	"Saviour"	Alicia Keys	As I Am	
2007	"Do Right"	Mario	Go	
2007	"Tick Tock"	Lemar	The Truth About Love	
2008	"Breathe Slow" †	Alesha Dixon	The Alesha Show	
2008	"Ego" †	Beyoncé	I Am... Sasha Fierce	
2009	"The Hardest Moment"	Mario	D.N.A.	
2013	"Soldier in the City"	Aloe Blacc	Lift Your Spirit	
2013	"Eyes of a Child"	Aloe Blacc	Lift Your Spirit	
2013	"Supa"	Chrisette Michele	Better	
2015	"28 Thousand Days" †	Alicia Keys	Non-album single	
2015	"Run Run Run"	Jill Scott	Woman	
2016	"It's You"	Zayn	Mind of Mine	
2016	"Befour"	Zayn	Mind of Mine	
2016	"Rear View"	Zayn	Mind of Mine	
2016	"Borderz"	Zayn	Mind of Mine	
2016	"Blue"	Zayn	Mind of Mine	
2016	"Bright"	Zayn	Mind of Mine	
2016	"Pawn It All"	Alicia Keys	Here	
2016	"Illusion of Bliss"	Alicia Keys	Here	
2016	"Girl Can't Be Herself"	Alicia Keys	Here	
2016	"More Than We Know"	Alicia Keys	Here	
2016	"Where Do We Begin Now"	Alicia Keys	Here	
2016	"What I'm Feelin'"	Anthony Hamilton	What I'm Feelin'	
2016	"Mean What I Mean"	AlunaGeorge	I Remember	
2016	"Wishes"	Wé McDonald	Non-album single	
2021	"Blue Mesas"	Leon Bridges	Gold-Diggers Sound	
2021	"Summer Rain"	Leon Bridges	Gold-Diggers Sound	
