= James Griffin (songwriter) =

- Birth name: Jamie Francis Griffin
- Origin: Australia
- Genres: rock, country
- Occupation(s): Songwriter, musician, poet, visual artist, playwright, broadcaster
- Instrument(s): Guitar, backing vocals
- Years active: 1979–present
- Labels: Hot, Radio, Chase
- Website: jamesgriffin.com.au

Jamie Francis "James" Griffin is an Australian singer-songwriter, poet, musician, playwright and broadcaster. His style is rock and country music, his work has been covered by other artists including The Black Sorrows and Lee Kernaghan. Griffin has led bands the Agents (1980–83) and James Griffin and the Subterraneans (1983–88); and released material as a solo artist.

== The Agents ==
Jamie Francis Griffin started his musical career in 1979 with a self-financed four-track extended play, James Griffin. He formed a country and rock music group, Agents, in 1980 with Lindy Allen on bass guitar, James McIntyre on keyboards and Robin Walsh on drums. This line-up released a single, "Suburbs of the Heart" (1980), which Griffin had written.

The second line-up was Griffin backed by Gye Bennetts (drums), Karl May (bass) and Kydric Shaw (keyboards, guitar). They released the "Merciless Cinema" 7-inch in 1981. Further lineup changes included the return of James McIntyre (guitar), Kim Knight (bass) and Dennis Flannery (drums). This lineup released the "Seven Samurai" 7-inch and No Adjustment To The Face mini-LP in 1983.

Griffin released a solo 7-inchEP, Panic, in December 1984.

== James Griffin and the Subterraneans ==
The Subterraneans was intended to have a floating lineup of musicians who did not have other commitments at the time.

== Later bands ==
In 1991, Griffin played with the Shadow Gang: Peter Harrison (drums), Roger Hart (guitar, vocals) and Rowan McKinnon (bass).

== Discography ==
=== James Griffin ===
- James Griffin - self-released (7-inch EP) (1979)
- Panic (Five Songs from Two Radio Plays) - Radio Records (7-inch EP) (1984)

=== Agents ===
- "Suburbs of the Heart" / "Night People" / "Behind the Noise" - self-released (7-inch) (1980)
- "Merciless Cinema" / "Manhattan Project" - self-released (7-inch) (1981)
- "Seven Samurai" - Hot Records (7-inch) (1982)
- No Adjustment To The Face - Hot Records (mini-LP) (1983)

=== James Griffin and the Subterraneans ===
- The Immigrant Tango - Chase Records (mini-LP) (1985)
- A Cure for Snakebite - Chase Records (LP) (1986)
- True Love and the Many Meanings of Invisibility - Chase Records (LP) (1987)
- Land of a Thousand Dances (A Rock'n'Roll Novel) - Chase Records (LP) (1987)
