= We Are Here (song) =

Single by Alicia Keys
- Released: September 15, 2014
- Genre: R&B
- Length: 4:44
- Label: RCA
- Songwriters: Alicia Keys; Swizz Beatz; Mark Batson; Harold Lilly
- Producers: Alicia Keys; Swizz Beatz; Mark Batson; Harold Lilly

Alicia Keys singles chronology
"It's On Again" (2014)	"We Are Here" (2014)	"28 Thousand Days" (2015)

Music video
- "We Are Here" on YouTube

"We Are Here" is a song by American recording artist Alicia Keys. It was published on September 15, 2014, through RCA Records. It was written and produced by Keys, Swizz Beatz, Mark Batson, and Harold Lilly and reflects about both national and international social and political issues. The song won NAACP Image Award for Outstanding Song and was nominated for Best Song with a Social Message at the 2014 MTV Europe Music Awards.

"We Are Here" was featured in the short film We Rise; that film was part of the New-York Historical Society's "Hotbed" exhibit about women's suffrage, which ran from November 3, 2017, to March 25, 2018.

== Composition and development ==
"We Are Here" is just really about how we can all be together. We’re going through witnessing what’s happening in the world and feeling overwhelmed or feeling inspired to do something about it or whatever the case. And so this song really talks about all that and somehow it allows us to have this dialog about why are you here. I think that’s been really powerful. People have been responding to it. I’m looking forward to continuing to spread that dialog, that conversation

— Keys to Billboard in 2014

The song, written and produced by Keys, Swizz Beatz, Mark Batson, and Harold Lilly, is an up-tempo ballad which describes Keys' frustration with both national and international issues, including the conflict between Israel and Gaza and the outbreak of the Ebola virus, as well as problems with education and gun laws in the United States. The song debuted on Keys' Facebook page on September 8, 2014, accompanied by a text post explaining Keys' motivations and inspirations for the song. It was released digitally a week later and Keys performed the song on Today on September 15.

Following the song's release, Keys launched a movement, called the We Are Here Movement, calling for a more equal and just world. Some social issues that the movement promotes is ending poverty and oppression, rights for women and children, and environmental activism. On the site of the cause, people can read about and donate to 12 different groups, striving towards, among other things, improving gay rights, fighting racial inequity in the American justice system, and also her own organization, Keep a Child Alive. Keys donated $1 million of her own money divided equally amongst the 12 groups.

== Critical reception ==
Billboard rated the song two stars out of five and gave the song a negative review. The review stated that an attempt "to effect social change through song would hit if it weren't such an overwrought exercise in cliche. The midtempo cut attempts to unify, but its earnestness is embarrassing".

== Music video ==
The music video of "We Are Here" premiered on Facebook on September 8, 2014, and was uploaded to YouTube on September 15. The video, which was directed by Art Johnson, is set on top of a skyscraper in New York City, with Keys playing the piano and singing. On the piano, the words "freedom" and "peace" are written multiple times. The video ends with the words "War is over if you want it".

== Live performances ==
"We Are Here" was performed on Today on September 15, 2014. During the performance, Keys was sitting behind a piano that read "Love". Rap-Up commented that Keys "belted out the inspiring anthem". Vibe wrote that Keys "let her voice scale high over the song". Robbie Daw of Idolator said that Keys delivered a "touching performance" of the song.

Keys sang "We Are Here" on the Elvis Duran and the Morning Show on September 17, 2014. Keys made a surprise appearance at the iHeartRadio Music Festival in Las Vegas on September 19, 2014, and performed "We Are Here". During the performance, pictures of people and their #WeAreHere messages were shown. On September 27, 2014, she performed the song together with Amir-Kanoon and Idan Raichel onstage at the 2014 Global Citizen Festival in Central Park in New York City. On September 29, 2014, Keys appeared on The View and performed "We Are Here". Keys performed "We Are Here" along with "Empire State of Mind" and "No One" at the 2014 We Can Survive Concert held at the Hollywood Bowl in Los Angeles on October 24, 2014. During an interview for Yahoo! Style, Keys performed a snippet of the song for Joe Zee. Keys will perform "We Are Here" live at the 2014 MTV Europe Music Awards.

== Track listing ==
Digital download
No.	Title	Length
1.	"We Are Here"	4:44

== Charts ==
Chart (2014)	Peak position
Czech Republic Airplay (ČNS IFPI)	96
Belgium Urban (Ultratop Flanders)	30
Belgium (Ultratip Bubbling Under Flanders)	43
France (SNEP)	111
Japan Hot 100 (Billboard)	55
Slovakia Airplay (ČNS IFPI)	47
South Korea (GAON) International Chart	41
Switzerland (Schweizer Hitparade)	32
