= Remixed (Alicia Keys album) =

Remix album by Alicia Keys
- Released: August 12, 2008
- Length: 33:02
- Label: J

Alicia Keys chronology
As I Am (2007)	Remixed (2008)	The Element of Freedom (2009)

Remixed is a Japan-only compilation album by American artist Alicia Keys. It was released to coincide with her appearance at the 2008 Summersonic festival. It peaked on the Oricon Weekly Album Chart at number 117 and spent five weeks on it. The album includes remixes from the Black Eyed Peas, Kanye West, Salaam Remi Jony Rockstar, Seiji and Wideboys.

== Track listing ==
Remixed track listing
No.	Title	Length
1.	"If I Ain't Got You" (The Black Eyed Peas Mix)	3:14
2.	"If I Ain't Got You" (Kanye West Mix)	3:46
3.	"Karma" (Reggaeton Mix; featuring Bimbo)	3:31
4.	"Like You'll Never See Me Again" (Jony Rockstar Mix)	3:49
5.	"Like You'll Never See Me Again" (Seiji Mix)	3:42
6.	"No One" (Salaam Remi Mix; featuring Junior Reid)	4:51
7.	"No One" (Jony Rockstar Mix)	3:50
8.	"Teenage Love Affair" (Wideboys Miami Club Mix)	6:19
Total length:		33:02

== Charts ==
Chart performance for Remixed
Chart (2008)	Peak position
Japanese Albums (Oricon)	117
