= I Need You =

I Need You or I Need U may refer to:

== Films ==
- I Need You (film), a 1944 German film
- "I Need You", the second half of the 1997 film The End of Evangelion

== Music ==
=== Albums ===
- I Need You (album), by LeAnn Rimes, 2001
- I Need You (Bestie EP) (reissue of Hot Baby) or the title song, 2014
- I Need You (K.Will EP) or the title song, 2012
- I Need You (The Walker Brothers EP) or the title song, 1966

=== Songs ===
- "I Need You" (America song), 1972
- "I Need You" (Armin van Buuren & Garibay song), 2017
- "I Need You" (Beatles song), 1965
- "I Need You" (Dave Gahan song), 2003
- "I Need You" (Eric Carmen song), 1977; first sung by Frankie Valli, and then covered by the Euclid Beach Band (1979) and 3T (1996)
- "I Need You" (Jars of Clay song), 2002
- "I Need You" (The Kinks song), 1965
- "I Need You" (LeAnn Rimes song), 2000
- "I Need You" (Marc Anthony song), 2002
- "I Need You" (Maurice White song), 1985
- "I Need You" (N-Dubz song), 2009
- "I Need You" (Paris Hilton song), 2018
- "I Need You" (Relient K song), 2007
- "I Need You" (Tim McGraw and Faith Hill song), 2007
- "I Need You" (Trisha Yearwood song), 1997
- "I Need U" (BTS song), 2015
- "I Need U" (Lay song), 2017
- "I Need You", by Alicia Keys from As I Am, 2007
- "I Need You", by Billy Squier from Don't Say No, 1981
- "I Need You", by B.V.S.M.P., 1988
- "I Need You", by the D.E.Y., 2008
- "I Need You", by Deuce from On the Loose!, 1995
- "I Need You", by Dry Cleaning from Secret Love, 2026
- "I Need You", by Eurythmics from Savage, 1987
- "I Need You", by the Hedrons, 2006
- "I Need You", by Joe Dolan, 1977
- "I Need You", by Jon Batiste from We Are, 2021
- "I Need You", by Lita Roza, 1957
- "I Need You", by Lynyrd Skynyrd from Second Helping, 1974
- "I Need You", by M83 from Divergent: Original Motion Picture Soundtrack, 2014
- "I Need You", by the Muffs from The Muffs, 1993
- "I Need You", by the Naked Brothers Band from the film The Naked Brothers Band: The Movie, 2005
- "I Need You", by Nick Cave and the Bad Seeds from Skeleton Tree, 2016
- "I Need You", by Oliver Tree from Love You Madly Hate You Badly, 2026
- "I Need You", by Pat DiNizio from Pat DiNizio, 2007
- "I Need You", by Paul Carrack from Suburban Voodoo, 1982
- "I Need You", by Paul Revere & the Raiders from Alias Pink Puzz, 1969
- "I Need You", by Paula Abdul from Forever Your Girl, 1988
- "I Need You", by Thin Lizzy, the B-side of "The Farmer", 1971
- "I Need You", by Timbuk3 from Greetings from Timbuk3, 1986
- "I Need You", by Westlife from Westlife, 1999
- "I Need You", by the Who from A Quick One, 1966
- "I Need You (For Someone)", by the Jam from This Is the Modern World, 1977
- "I Need You (Option A)" and "I Need You (Mindwarp Remix)", by Pendulum from 3 Knocks, 1997
- "I Need You (That Thing You Do)", from the soundtrack of the film That Thing You Do!, 1996
- "I Need U", by Ken Carson from A Great Chaos, 2023

== See also ==
- Kailangan Ko'y Ikaw (TV series) (lit. I Need You), a 2013 Philippine series
- Need You (disambiguation)
- Necesito de Ti (disambiguation)
