= Need Me (disambiguation) =

"Need Me" is a 2019 song by J.I the Prince of N.Y.

Need Me may also refer to:

- "Need Me", a song by Eminem and Pink from the album Revival, 2017
- "Need Me", a 1957 song by Jimmy Newman
- "Need Me", a 2024 song by Sienna Spiro

== See also ==
- "Needed Me", a 2016 song by Rihanna
- Need You (disambiguation)
