= Necesito de Ti =

Necesito de Ti may refer to:

- Necesito de Ti (album), a 2009 album by Vicente Fernández
  - "Necesito de Ti" (Vicente Fernández song), 2009
- "Necesito de Ti" (Anthony Santos song), 2015

== See also ==
- I Need You (disambiguation)
