= List of number-one digital songs of 2007 (U.S.) =

2007 highest-selling digital singles in the United States

The highest-selling digital singles in the United States are ranked in the Hot Digital Songs chart, published by Billboard magazine. The data are compiled by Nielsen SoundScan based on each single's weekly digital sales, which combines sales of different versions of a single for a summarized figure.

Despite it never having reached number one on the weekly chart, having peaked at number two, the best-performing digital song of the 2007 chart year was "Big Girls Don't Cry" by Fergie.

== Chart history ==
Issue date	Song	Artist(s)	Weekly sales	Ref(s)
January 6	"Irreplaceable"	Beyoncé		
January 13	"Fergalicious"	Fergie featuring will.i.am	295,000	
January 20	"Fergalicious"	Fergie featuring will.i.am		
January 27	"Irreplaceable"	Beyoncé		
February 5	"This Ain't a Scene, It's an Arms Race"	Fall Out Boy	162,000	
February 10	"This Ain't a Scene, It's an Arms Race"	Fall Out Boy		
February 17	"This Ain't a Scene, It's an Arms Race"	Fall Out Boy		
February 24	"This Ain't a Scene, It's an Arms Race"	Fall Out Boy		
March 3	"What Goes Around... Comes Around"	Justin Timberlake	147,000	
March 10	"This Is Why I'm Hot"	Mims	135,000	
March 17	"This Is Why I'm Hot"	Mims		
March 24	"Glamorous"	Fergie featuring Ludacris	166,000	
March 31	"Glamorous"	Fergie featuring Ludacris		
April 7	"Beautiful Liar"	Beyoncé featuring Shakira	150,000	
April 14	"The Sweet Escape"	Gwen Stefani featuring Akon	140,200	
April 21	"Give It to Me"	Timbaland featuring Nelly Furtado and Justin Timberlake	248,000	
April 28	"Give It to Me"	Timbaland featuring Nelly Furtado and Justin Timberlake		
May 5	"Girlfriend"	Avril Lavigne	156,500	
May 12	"Makes Me Wonder"	Maroon 5	243,500	
May 19	"Makes Me Wonder"	Maroon 5		
May 26	"Makes Me Wonder"	Maroon 5	131,000	
June 2	"Makes Me Wonder"	Maroon 5	164,000	
June 9	"Umbrella"	Rihanna featuring Jay-Z	277,000	
June 16	"Umbrella"	Rihanna featuring Jay-Z		
June 23	"Umbrella"	Rihanna featuring Jay-Z		
June 30	"Umbrella"	Rihanna featuring Jay-Z		
July 7	"Umbrella"	Rihanna featuring Jay-Z		
July 14	"Hey There Delilah"	Plain White T's	146,000	
July 21	"Hey There Delilah"	Plain White T's		
July 28	"Hey There Delilah"	Plain White T's		
August 4	"Hey There Delilah"	Plain White T's		
August 11	"Beautiful Girls"	Sean Kingston	260,000	
August 18	"Beautiful Girls"	Sean Kingston	235,000	
August 25	"Beautiful Girls"	Sean Kingston		
September 1	"Beautiful Girls"	Sean Kingston		
September 8	"Stronger"	Kanye West	135,000	
September 15	"Crank That (Soulja Boy)"	Soulja Boy Tell 'Em	144,000	
September 22	"Crank That (Soulja Boy)"	Soulja Boy Tell 'Em		
September 29	"Stronger"	Kanye West	205,000	
October 6	"Crank That (Soulja Boy)"	Soulja Boy Tell 'Em	183,000	
October 13	"Gimme More"	Britney Spears	179,000	
October 20	"Crank That (Soulja Boy)"	Soulja Boy Tell 'Em		
October 27	"Crank That (Soulja Boy)"	Soulja Boy Tell 'Em		
November 3	"Kiss Kiss"	Chris Brown featuring T-Pain	159,000	
November 10	"Kiss Kiss"	Chris Brown featuring T-Pain	187,000	
November 17	"Apologize"	Timbaland featuring OneRepublic		
November 24	"Apologize"	Timbaland featuring OneRepublic		
December 1	"No One"	Alicia Keys	210,000	
December 8	"No One"	Alicia Keys		
December 15	"Low"	Flo Rida featuring T-Pain		
December 22	"Low"	Flo Rida featuring T-Pain		
December 29	"Low"	Flo Rida featuring T-Pain		

== See also ==
- 2007 in music
- Digital Songs
