= List of Hot 100 Airplay number-one singles of the 2000s =

This is a list of songs which received the most airplay per week on radio stations in the United States as ranked and published by Billboard magazine on the Hot 100 Airplay chart during the 2000s.

== Number-one airplay hits ==
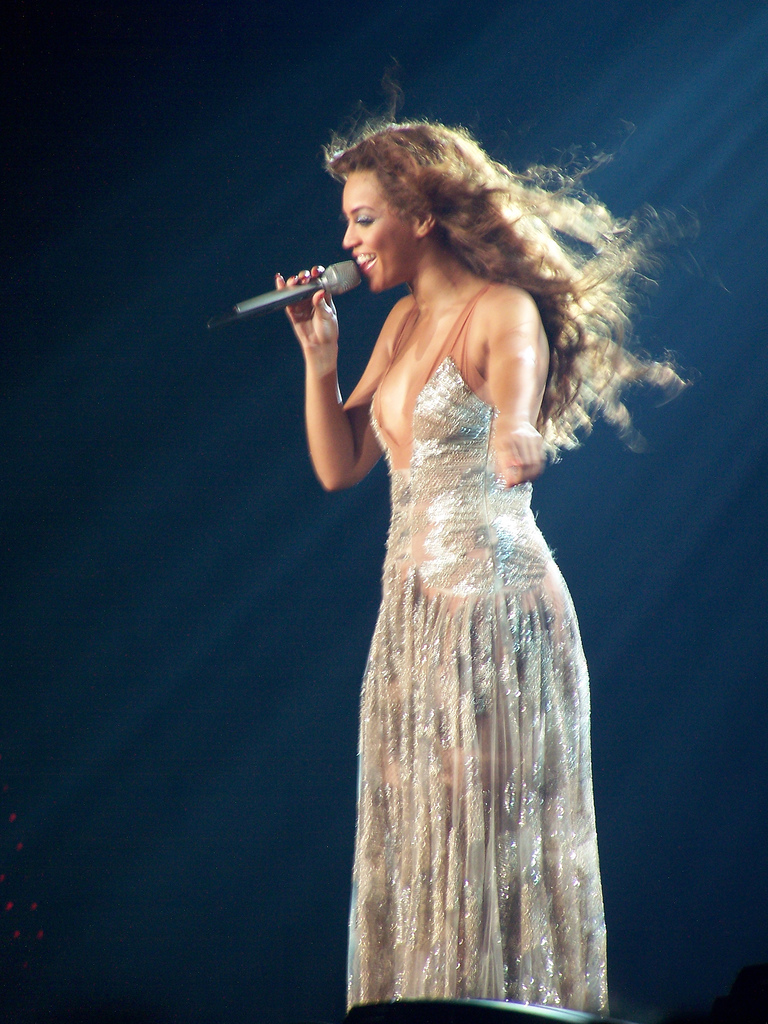
Beyoncé was listed as the top radio artist of the decade.

Issue date	Song	Artist(s)	Ref(s)
2000
January 1	"Back at One"	Brian McKnight	
January 8	"Back at One"	Brian McKnight	
January 15	"Back at One"	Brian McKnight	
January 22	"Back at One"	Brian McKnight	
January 29	"I Knew I Loved You"	Savage Garden	
February 5	"I Knew I Loved You"	Savage Garden	
February 12	"I Knew I Loved You"	Savage Garden	
February 19	"I Knew I Loved You"	Savage Garden	
February 26	"I Knew I Loved You"	Savage Garden	
March 4	"I Knew I Loved You"	Savage Garden	
March 11	"Bye Bye Bye"	'N Sync	
March 18	"Bye Bye Bye"	'N Sync	
March 25	"Bye Bye Bye"	'N Sync	
April 1	"Bye Bye Bye"	'N Sync	
April 8	"Say My Name"	Destiny's Child	
April 15	"Bye Bye Bye"	'N Sync	
April 22	"Maria Maria"	Santana featuring The Product G&B	
April 29	"Thong Song"	Sisqó	
May 6	"Thong Song"	Sisqó	
May 13	"Thong Song"	Sisqó	
May 20	"Thong Song"	Sisqó	
May 27	"Thong Song"	Sisqó	
June 3	"Thong Song"	Sisqó	
June 10	"Thong Song"	Sisqó	
June 17	"Try Again"	Aaliyah	
June 24	"Try Again"	Aaliyah	
July 1	"Try Again"	Aaliyah	
July 8	"Try Again"	Aaliyah	
July 15	"Try Again"	Aaliyah	
July 22	"Try Again"	Aaliyah	
July 29	"Try Again"	Aaliyah	
August 5	"Try Again"	Aaliyah	
August 12	"Try Again"	Aaliyah	
August 19	"Jumpin' Jumpin'"	Destiny's Child	
August 26	"Jumpin' Jumpin'"	Destiny's Child	
September 2	"Jumpin' Jumpin'"	Destiny's Child	
September 9	"Jumpin' Jumpin'"	Destiny's Child	
September 16	"Jumpin' Jumpin'"	Destiny's Child	
September 23	"Jumpin' Jumpin'"	Destiny's Child	
September 30	"Jumpin' Jumpin'"	Destiny's Child	
October 7	"Kryptonite"	3 Doors Down	
October 14	"Kryptonite"	3 Doors Down	
October 21	"Kryptonite"	3 Doors Down	
October 28	"Kryptonite"	3 Doors Down	
November 4	"Kryptonite"	3 Doors Down	
November 11	"Kryptonite"	3 Doors Down	
November 18	"Independent Women Part I"	Destiny's Child	
November 25	"Independent Women Part I"	Destiny's Child	
December 2	"Independent Women Part I"	Destiny's Child	
December 9	"Independent Women Part I"	Destiny's Child	
December 16	"Independent Women Part I"	Destiny's Child	
December 23	"Independent Women Part I"	Destiny's Child	
December 30	"Independent Women Part I"	Destiny's Child	
2001
January 6	"Independent Women Part I"	Destiny's Child	
January 13	"Independent Women Part I"	Destiny's Child	
January 20	"It Wasn't Me"	Shaggy featuring Ricardo "RikRok" Ducent	
January 27	"It Wasn't Me"	Shaggy featuring Ricardo "RikRok" Ducent	
February 3	"It Wasn't Me"	Shaggy featuring Ricardo "RikRok" Ducent	
February 10	"It Wasn't Me"	Shaggy featuring Ricardo "RikRok" Ducent	
February 17	"It Wasn't Me"	Shaggy featuring Ricardo "RikRok" Ducent	
February 24	"Love Don't Cost a Thing"	Jennifer Lopez	
March 3	"Love Don't Cost a Thing"	Jennifer Lopez	
March 10	"Angel"	Shaggy featuring Rayvon	
March 17	"Angel"	Shaggy featuring Rayvon	
March 24	"Angel"	Shaggy featuring Rayvon	
March 31	"Angel"	Shaggy featuring Rayvon	
April 7	"Angel"	Shaggy featuring Rayvon	
April 14	"Survivor"	Destiny's Child	
April 21	"Survivor"	Destiny's Child	
April 28	"Survivor"	Destiny's Child	
May 5	"Survivor"	Destiny's Child	
May 12	"Survivor"	Destiny's Child	
May 19	"All For You"	Janet Jackson	
May 26	"All For You"	Janet Jackson	
June 2	"Lady Marmalade"	Christina Aguilera, Pink, Mýa, Lil' Kim	
June 9	"Lady Marmalade"	Christina Aguilera, Pink, Mýa, Lil' Kim	
June 16	"Lady Marmalade"	Christina Aguilera, Pink, Mýa, Lil' Kim	
June 23	"Lady Marmalade"	Christina Aguilera, Pink, Mýa, Lil' Kim	
June 30	"Lady Marmalade"	Christina Aguilera, Pink, Mýa, Lil' Kim	
July 7	"Lady Marmalade"	Christina Aguilera, Pink, Mýa, Lil' Kim	
July 14	"Hanging by a Moment"	Lifehouse	
July 21	"Let Me Blow Ya Mind"	Eve featuring Gwen Stefani	
July 28	"Let Me Blow Ya Mind"	Eve featuring Gwen Stefani	
August 4	"Let Me Blow Ya Mind"	Eve featuring Gwen Stefani	
August 11	"Let Me Blow Ya Mind"	Eve featuring Gwen Stefani	
August 18	"Fallin'"	Alicia Keys	
August 25	"Fallin'"	Alicia Keys	
September 1	"Fallin'"	Alicia Keys	
September 8	"I'm Real"	Jennifer Lopez featuring Ja Rule	
September 15	"I'm Real"	Jennifer Lopez featuring Ja Rule	
September 22	"I'm Real"	Jennifer Lopez featuring Ja Rule	
September 29	"Fallin"	Alicia Keys	
October 6	"Fallin"	Alicia Keys	
October 13	"Fallin"	Alicia Keys	
October 20	"I'm Real"	Jennifer Lopez featuring Ja Rule	
October 27	"I'm Real"	Jennifer Lopez featuring Ja Rule	
November 3	"I'm Real"	Jennifer Lopez featuring Ja Rule	
November 10	"Family Affair"	Mary J. Blige	
November 17	"Family Affair"	Mary J. Blige	
November 24	"Family Affair"	Mary J. Blige	
December 1	"Family Affair"	Mary J. Blige	
December 8	"Family Affair"	Mary J. Blige	
December 15	"U Got It Bad"	Usher	
December 22	"U Got It Bad"	Usher	
December 29	"U Got It Bad"	Usher	
2002
January 5	"U Got It Bad"	Usher	
January 12	"U Got It Bad"	Usher	
January 19	"U Got It Bad"	Usher	
January 26	"U Got It Bad"	Usher	
February 2	"U Got It Bad"	Usher	
February 9	"U Got It Bad"	Usher	
February 16	"U Got It Bad"	Usher	
February 23	"Always on Time"	Ja Rule featuring Ashanti	
March 2	"Always on Time"	Ja Rule featuring Ashanti	
March 9	"Ain't it Funny"	Jennifer Lopez featuring Ja Rule	
March 16	"Ain't it Funny"	Jennifer Lopez featuring Ja Rule	
March 23	"Ain't it Funny"	Jennifer Lopez featuring Ja Rule	
March 30	"Ain't it Funny"	Jennifer Lopez featuring Ja Rule	
April 6	"Ain't it Funny"	Jennifer Lopez featuring Ja Rule	
April 13	"Ain't it Funny"	Jennifer Lopez featuring Ja Rule	
April 20	"Foolish"	Ashanti	
April 27	"Foolish"	Ashanti	
May 4	"Foolish"	Ashanti	
May 11	"Foolish"	Ashanti	
May 18	"Foolish"	Ashanti	
May 25	"Foolish"	Ashanti	
June 1	"Foolish"	Ashanti	
June 8	"Foolish"	Ashanti	
June 15	"Foolish"	Ashanti	
June 22	"Foolish"	Ashanti	
June 29	"Hot in Herre"	Nelly	
July 6	"Hot in Herre"	Nelly	
July 13	"Hot in Herre"	Nelly	
July 20	"Hot in Herre"	Nelly	
July 27	"Hot in Herre"	Nelly	
August 3	"Hot in Herre"	Nelly	
August 10	"Hot in Herre"	Nelly	
August 17	"Dilemma"	Nelly featuring Kelly Rowland	
August 24	"Dilemma"	Nelly featuring Kelly Rowland	
August 31	"Dilemma"	Nelly featuring Kelly Rowland	
September 7	"Dilemma"	Nelly featuring Kelly Rowland	
September 14	"Dilemma"	Nelly featuring Kelly Rowland	
September 21	"Dilemma"	Nelly featuring Kelly Rowland	
September 28	"Dilemma"	Nelly featuring Kelly Rowland	
October 5	"Dilemma"	Nelly featuring Kelly Rowland	
October 12	"Dilemma"	Nelly featuring Kelly Rowland	
October 19	"Dilemma"	Nelly featuring Kelly Rowland	
October 26	"Dilemma"	Nelly featuring Kelly Rowland	
November 2	"Dilemma"	Nelly featuring Kelly Rowland	
November 9	"Lose Yourself"	Eminem	
November 16	"Lose Yourself"	Eminem	
November 23	"Lose Yourself"	Eminem	
November 30	"Lose Yourself"	Eminem	
December 7	"Lose Yourself"	Eminem	
December 14	"Lose Yourself"	Eminem	
December 21	"Lose Yourself"	Eminem	
December 28	"Lose Yourself"	Eminem	
2003
January 4	"Lose Yourself"	Eminem	
January 11	"Lose Yourself"	Eminem	
January 18	"Lose Yourself"	Eminem	
January 25	"Bump, Bump, Bump"	B2K featuring P. Diddy	
February 1	"Bump, Bump, Bump"	B2K featuring P. Diddy	
February 8	"All I Have"	Jennifer Lopez featuring LL Cool J	
February 15	"All I Have"	Jennifer Lopez featuring LL Cool J	
February 22	"All I Have"	Jennifer Lopez featuring LL Cool J	
March 1	"All I Have"	Jennifer Lopez featuring LL Cool J	
March 8	"In Da Club"	50 Cent	
March 15	"In Da Club"	50 Cent	
March 22	"In Da Club"	50 Cent	
March 29	"In Da Club"	50 Cent	
April 5	"In Da Club"	50 Cent	
April 12	"In Da Club"	50 Cent	
April 19	"In Da Club"	50 Cent	
April 26	"In Da Club"	50 Cent	
May 3	"In Da Club"	50 Cent	
May 10	"Get Busy"	Sean Paul	
May 17	"Get Busy"	Sean Paul	
May 24	"Get Busy"	Sean Paul	
May 31	"21 Questions"	50 Cent featuring Nate Dogg	
June 7	"21 Questions"	50 Cent featuring Nate Dogg	
June 14	"21 Questions"	50 Cent featuring Nate Dogg	
June 21	"21 Questions"	50 Cent featuring Nate Dogg	
June 28	"21 Questions"	50 Cent featuring Nate Dogg	
July 5	"Magic Stick"	Lil' Kim featuring 50 Cent	
July 12	"Crazy in Love"	Beyoncé featuring Jay-Z	
July 19	"Crazy in Love"	Beyoncé featuring Jay-Z	
July 26	"Crazy in Love"	Beyoncé featuring Jay-Z	
August 2	"Crazy in Love"	Beyoncé featuring Jay-Z	
August 9	"Crazy in Love"	Beyoncé featuring Jay-Z	
August 16	"Crazy in Love"	Beyoncé featuring Jay-Z	
August 23	"Crazy in Love"	Beyoncé featuring Jay-Z	
August 30	"Crazy in Love"	Beyoncé featuring Jay-Z	
September 6	"Shake Ya Tailfeather"	Nelly, P. Diddy and Murphy Lee	
September 13	"Shake Ya Tailfeather"	Nelly, P. Diddy and Murphy Lee	
September 20	"Shake Ya Tailfeather"	Nelly, P. Diddy and Murphy Lee	
September 27	"Shake Ya Tailfeather"	Nelly, P. Diddy and Murphy Lee	
October 4	"Baby Boy"	Beyoncé featuring Sean Paul	
October 11	"Baby Boy"	Beyoncé featuring Sean Paul	
October 18	"Baby Boy"	Beyoncé featuring Sean Paul	
October 25	"Baby Boy"	Beyoncé featuring Sean Paul	
November 1	"Baby Boy"	Beyoncé featuring Sean Paul	
November 8	"Baby Boy"	Beyoncé featuring Sean Paul	
November 15	"Baby Boy"	Beyoncé featuring Sean Paul	
November 22	"Baby Boy"	Beyoncé featuring Sean Paul	
November 29	"Baby Boy"	Beyoncé featuring Sean Paul	
December 6	"Stand Up"	Ludacris featuring Shawnna	
December 13	"Hey Ya!"	OutKast	
December 20	"Hey Ya!"	OutKast	
December 27	"Hey Ya!"	OutKast	
2004
January 3	"Hey Ya!"	OutKast	
January 10	"Hey Ya!"	OutKast	
January 17	"Hey Ya!"	OutKast	
January 24	"Hey Ya!"	OutKast	
January 31	"Hey Ya!"	OutKast	
February 7	"Hey Ya!"	OutKast	
February 14	"Slow Jamz"	Twista featuring Kanye West and Jamie Foxx	
February 21	"Slow Jamz"	Twista featuring Kanye West and Jamie Foxx	
February 28	"Yeah!"	Usher featuring Lil Jon and Ludacris	
March 6	"Yeah!"	Usher featuring Lil Jon and Ludacris	
March 13	"Yeah!"	Usher featuring Lil Jon and Ludacris	
March 20	"Yeah!"	Usher featuring Lil Jon and Ludacris	
March 27	"Yeah!"	Usher featuring Lil Jon and Ludacris	
April 3	"Yeah!"	Usher featuring Lil Jon and Ludacris	
April 10	"Yeah!"	Usher featuring Lil Jon and Ludacris	
April 17	"Yeah!"	Usher featuring Lil Jon and Ludacris	
April 24	"Yeah!"	Usher featuring Lil Jon and Ludacris	
May 1	"Yeah!"	Usher featuring Lil Jon and Ludacris	
May 8	"Yeah!"	Usher featuring Lil Jon and Ludacris	
May 15	"Yeah!"	Usher featuring Lil Jon and Ludacris	
May 22	"Burn"	Usher	
May 29	"Burn"	Usher	
June 6	"Burn"	Usher	
June 13	"Burn"	Usher	
June 20	"Burn"	Usher	
June 27	"Burn"	Usher	
July 3	"Burn"	Usher	
July 10	"Burn"	Usher	
July 17	"Confessions Part II"	Usher	
July 24	"Confessions Part II"	Usher	
July 31	"Confessions Part II"	Usher	
August 7	"Slow Motion"	Juvenile featuring Soulja Slim	
August 14	"Slow Motion"	Juvenile featuring Soulja Slim	
August 21	"Lean Back"	Terror Squad	
August 28	"Lean Back"	Terror Squad	
September 4	"Lean Back"	Terror Squad	
September 11	"Goodies"	Ciara featuring Petey Pablo	
September 18	"Goodies"	Ciara featuring Petey Pablo	
September 25	"Goodies"	Ciara featuring Petey Pablo	
October 2	"Goodies"	Ciara featuring Petey Pablo	
October 9	"Goodies"	Ciara featuring Petey Pablo	
October 16	"Goodies"	Ciara featuring Petey Pablo	
October 23	"Goodies"	Ciara featuring Petey Pablo	
October 30	"My Boo"	Usher and Alicia Keys	
November 6	"My Boo"	Usher and Alicia Keys	
November 13	"My Boo"	Usher and Alicia Keys	
November 20	"My Boo"	Usher and Alicia Keys	
November 27	"My Boo"	Usher and Alicia Keys	
December 4	"My Boo"	Usher and Alicia Keys	
December 11	"Drop It Like It's Hot"	Snoop Dogg featuring Pharrell	
December 18	"Drop It Like It's Hot"	Snoop Dogg featuring Pharrell	
December 25	"Drop It Like It's Hot"	Snoop Dogg featuring Pharrell	
2005
January 1	"Let Me Love You"	Mario	
January 8	"Let Me Love You"	Mario	
January 15	"Let Me Love You"	Mario	
January 22	"Let Me Love You"	Mario	
January 29	"Let Me Love You"	Mario	
February 5	"Let Me Love You"	Mario	
February 12	"Let Me Love You"	Mario	
February 19	"Let Me Love You"	Mario	
February 26	"Let Me Love You"	Mario	
March 5	"Let Me Love You"	Mario	
March 12	"Let Me Love You"	Mario	
March 19	"Candy Shop"	50 Cent featuring Olivia	
March 26	"Candy Shop"	50 Cent featuring Olivia	
April 2	"Candy Shop"	50 Cent featuring Olivia	
April 9	"Candy Shop"	50 Cent featuring Olivia	
April 16	"Candy Shop"	50 Cent featuring Olivia	
April 23	"Candy Shop"	50 Cent featuring Olivia	
April 30	"Candy Shop"	50 Cent featuring Olivia	
May 7	"Hate It or Love It"	The Game featuring 50 Cent	
May 14	"Oh"	Ciara featuring Ludacris	
May 21	"Oh"	Ciara featuring Ludacris	
May 28	"We Belong Together"	Mariah Carey	
June 4	"We Belong Together"	Mariah Carey	
June 11	"We Belong Together"	Mariah Carey	
June 18	"We Belong Together"	Mariah Carey	
June 25	"We Belong Together"	Mariah Carey	
July 2	"We Belong Together"	Mariah Carey	
July 9	"We Belong Together"	Mariah Carey	
July 16	"We Belong Together"	Mariah Carey	
July 23	"We Belong Together"	Mariah Carey	
July 30	"We Belong Together"	Mariah Carey	
August 6	"We Belong Together"	Mariah Carey	
August 13	"We Belong Together"	Mariah Carey	
August 20	"We Belong Together"	Mariah Carey	
August 27	"We Belong Together"	Mariah Carey	
September 3	"We Belong Together"	Mariah Carey	
September 10	"We Belong Together"	Mariah Carey	
September 17	"Shake It Off"	Mariah Carey	
September 24	"Shake It Off"	Mariah Carey	
October 1	"Shake It Off"	Mariah Carey	
October 8	"Gold Digger"	Kanye West featuring Jamie Foxx	
October 15	"Gold Digger"	Kanye West featuring Jamie Foxx	
October 22	"Gold Digger"	Kanye West featuring Jamie Foxx	
October 29	"Gold Digger"	Kanye West featuring Jamie Foxx	
November 5	"Gold Digger"	Kanye West featuring Jamie Foxx	
November 12	"Run It!"	Chris Brown	
November 19	"Run It!"	Chris Brown	
November 26	"Run It!"	Chris Brown	
December 3	"Run It!"	Chris Brown	
December 10	"Run It!"	Chris Brown	
December 17	"Run It!"	Chris Brown	
December 24	"Run It!"	Chris Brown	
December 31	"Don't Forget About Us"	Mariah Carey	
2006
January 7	"Don't Forget About Us"	Mariah Carey	
January 14	"Don't Forget About Us"	Mariah Carey	
January 21	"Don't Forget About Us"	Mariah Carey	
January 28	"Don't Forget About Us"	Mariah Carey	
February 4	"Check on It"	Beyoncé featuring Slim Thug	
February 11	"Check on It"	Beyoncé featuring Slim Thug	
February 18	"Check on It"	Beyoncé featuring Slim Thug	
February 25	"Be Without You"	Mary J. Blige	
March 4	"Be Without You"	Mary J. Blige	
March 11	"Be Without You"	Mary J. Blige	
March 18	"Be Without You"	Mary J. Blige	
March 25	"Be Without You"	Mary J. Blige	
April 1	"Be Without You"	Mary J. Blige	
April 8	"Be Without You"	Mary J. Blige	
April 15	"Be Without You"	Mary J. Blige	
April 22	"Be Without You"	Mary J. Blige	
April 29	"Temperature"	Sean Paul	
May 6	"Temperature"	Sean Paul	
May 13	"Temperature"	Sean Paul	
May 20	"Temperature"	Sean Paul	
May 27	"Hips Don't Lie"	Shakira featuring Wyclef Jean	
June 3	"Hips Don't Lie"	Shakira featuring Wyclef Jean	
June 10	"Hips Don't Lie"	Shakira featuring Wyclef Jean	
June 17	"Ridin'"	Chamillionaire featuring Krayzie Bone	
June 24	"Ridin'"	Chamillionaire featuring Krayzie Bone	
July 1	"It's Goin' Down"	Yung Joc	
July 8	"It's Goin' Down"	Yung Joc	
July 15	"It's Goin' Down"	Yung Joc	
July 22	"It's Goin' Down"	Yung Joc	
July 29	"Me & U"	Cassie	
August 5	"Me & U"	Cassie	
August 12	"Me & U"	Cassie	
August 19	"Me & U"	Cassie	
August 26	"Me & U"	Cassie	
September 2	"Me & U"	Cassie	
September 9	"Me & U"	Cassie	
September 16	"(When You Gonna) Give It Up to Me"	Sean Paul featuring Keyshia Cole	
September 23	"Pullin' Me Back"	Chingy featuring Tyrese	
September 30	"SexyBack"	Justin Timberlake	
October 7	"SexyBack"	Justin Timberlake	
October 14	"SexyBack"	Justin Timberlake	
October 21	"SexyBack"	Justin Timberlake	
October 28	"Money Maker"	Ludacris featuring Pharrell	
November 4	"Money Maker"	Ludacris featuring Pharrell	
November 11	"My Love"	Justin Timberlake featuring T.I.	
November 18	"My Love"	Justin Timberlake featuring T.I.	
November 25	"My Love"	Justin Timberlake featuring T.I.	
December 2	"My Love"	Justin Timberlake featuring T.I.	
December 9	"My Love"	Justin Timberlake featuring T.I.	
December 16	"Irreplaceable"	Beyoncé	
December 23	"Irreplaceable"	Beyoncé	
December 30	"Irreplaceable"	Beyoncé	
2007
January 6	"Irreplaceable"	Beyoncé	
January 13	"Irreplaceable"	Beyoncé	
January 20	"Irreplaceable"	Beyoncé	
January 27	"Irreplaceable"	Beyoncé	
February 3	"Irreplaceable"	Beyoncé	
February 10	"Irreplaceable"	Beyoncé	
February 17	"Irreplaceable"	Beyoncé	
February 24	"Irreplaceable"	Beyoncé	
March 3	"Runaway Love"	Ludacris featuring Mary J. Blige	
March 10	"Runaway Love"	Ludacris featuring Mary J. Blige	
March 17	"You"	Lloyd featuring Lil Wayne	
March 24	"This Is Why I'm Hot"	Mims	
March 31	"This Is Why I'm Hot"	Mims	
April 7	"Don't Matter"	Akon	
April 14	"Don't Matter"	Akon	
April 21	"Don't Matter"	Akon	
April 28	"Don't Matter"	Akon	
May 5	"Don't Matter"	Akon	
May 12	"Don't Matter"	Akon	
May 19	"Buy U a Drank (Shawty Snappin')"	T-Pain featuring Yung Joc	
May 26	"Buy U a Drank (Shawty Snappin')"	T-Pain featuring Yung Joc	
June 2	"Buy U a Drank (Shawty Snappin')"	T-Pain featuring Yung Joc	
June 9	"Buy U a Drank (Shawty Snappin')"	T-Pain featuring Yung Joc	
June 16	"Buy U a Drank (Shawty Snappin')"	T-Pain featuring Yung Joc	
June 23	"Buy U a Drank (Shawty Snappin')"	T-Pain featuring Yung Joc	
June 30	"Buy U a Drank (Shawty Snappin')"	T-Pain featuring Yung Joc	
July 7	"Buy U a Drank (Shawty Snappin')"	T-Pain featuring Yung Joc	
July 14	"Umbrella"	Rihanna featuring Jay-Z	
July 21	"Umbrella"	Rihanna featuring Jay-Z	
July 28	"Umbrella"	Rihanna featuring Jay-Z	
August 4	"Umbrella"	Rihanna featuring Jay-Z	
August 11	"Beautiful Girls"	Sean Kingston	
August 18	"Big Girls Don't Cry"	Fergie	
August 25	"Big Girls Don't Cry"	Fergie	
September 1	"Big Girls Don't Cry"	Fergie	
September 8	"Big Girls Don't Cry"	Fergie	
September 15	"Big Girls Don't Cry"	Fergie	
September 22	"Big Girls Don't Cry"	Fergie	
September 29	"Big Girls Don't Cry"	Fergie	
October 6	"Stronger"	Kanye West	
October 13	"Crank That (Soulja Boy)"	Soulja Boy Tell 'Em	
October 20	"Crank That (Soulja Boy)"	Soulja Boy Tell 'Em	
October 27	"Crank That (Soulja Boy)"	Soulja Boy Tell 'Em	
November 3	"No One"	Alicia Keys	
November 10	"No One"	Alicia Keys	
November 17	"No One"	Alicia Keys	
November 24	"No One"	Alicia Keys	
December 1	"No One"	Alicia Keys	
December 8	"No One"	Alicia Keys	
December 15	"No One"	Alicia Keys	
December 22	"No One"	Alicia Keys	
December 29	"No One"	Alicia Keys	
2008
January 5	"No One"	Alicia Keys	
January 12	"No One"	Alicia Keys	
January 19	"No One"	Alicia Keys	
January 26	"No One"	Alicia Keys	
February 2	"No One"	Alicia Keys	
February 9	"Low"	Flo Rida featuring T-Pain	
February 16	"Low"	Flo Rida featuring T-Pain	
February 23	"Low"	Flo Rida featuring T-Pain	
March 1	"Low"	Flo Rida featuring T-Pain	
March 8	"With You"	Chris Brown	
March 15	"With You"	Chris Brown	
March 22	"With You"	Chris Brown	
March 29	"With You"	Chris Brown	
April 5	"With You"	Chris Brown	
April 12	"With You"	Chris Brown	
April 19	"Love in This Club"	Usher featuring Young Jeezy	
April 26	"Love in This Club"	Usher featuring Young Jeezy	
May 3	"Love in This Club"	Usher featuring Young Jeezy	
May 10	"Love in This Club"	Usher featuring Young Jeezy	
May 17	"Lollipop"	Lil' Wayne featuring Static Major	
May 24	"Lollipop"	Lil' Wayne featuring Static Major	
May 31	"Lollipop"	Lil' Wayne featuring Static Major	
June 7	"Lollipop"	Lil' Wayne featuring Static Major	
June 14	"Lollipop"	Lil' Wayne featuring Static Major	
June 21	"Lollipop"	Lil' Wayne featuring Static Major	
June 28	"Lollipop"	Lil' Wayne featuring Static Major	
July 5	"Lollipop"	Lil' Wayne featuring Static Major	
July 12	"Lollipop"	Lil' Wayne featuring Static Major	
July 19	"Lollipop"	Lil' Wayne featuring Static Major	
July 26	"Take A Bow"	Rihanna	
August 2	"Take A Bow"	Rihanna	
August 9	"Take A Bow"	Rihanna	
August 16	"Take A Bow"	Rihanna	
August 23	"Take A Bow"	Rihanna	
August 30	"Take A Bow"	Rihanna	
September 6	"Forever"	Chris Brown	
September 13	"Forever"	Chris Brown	
September 20	"Forever"	Chris Brown	
September 27	"Closer"	Ne-Yo	
October 4	"Whatever You Like"	T.I.	
October 11	"Whatever You Like"	T.I.	
October 18	"Whatever You Like"	T.I.	
October 25	"Whatever You Like"	T.I.	
November 1	"Whatever You Like"	T.I.	
November 8	"Whatever You Like"	T.I.	
November 15	"Whatever You Like"	T.I.	
November 22	"Whatever You Like"	T.I.	
November 29	"Live Your Life"	T.I. featuring Rihanna	
December 6	"Live Your Life"	T.I. featuring Rihanna	
December 13	"Live Your Life"	T.I. featuring Rihanna	
December 20	"Live Your Life"	T.I. featuring Rihanna	
December 27	"Live Your Life"	T.I. featuring Rihanna	
2009
January 3	"Live Your Life"	T.I. featuring Rihanna	
January 10	"Live Your Life"	T.I. featuring Rihanna	
January 17	"Live Your Life"	T.I. featuring Rihanna	
January 24	"Single Ladies (Put a Ring on It)"	Beyoncé	
January 31	"Single Ladies (Put a Ring on It)"	Beyoncé	
February 7	"Single Ladies (Put a Ring on It)"	Beyoncé	
February 14	"Single Ladies (Put a Ring on It)"	Beyoncé	
February 21	"Single Ladies (Put a Ring on It)"	Beyoncé	
February 28	"Heartless"	Kanye West	
March 7	"Heartless"	Kanye West	
March 14	"Dead and Gone"	T.I. featuring Justin Timberlake	
March 21	"Dead and Gone"	T.I. featuring Justin Timberlake	
March 28	"Dead and Gone"	T.I. featuring Justin Timberlake	
April 4	"Dead and Gone"	T.I. featuring Justin Timberlake	
April 11	"Dead and Gone"	T.I. featuring Justin Timberlake	
April 18	"Dead and Gone"	T.I. featuring Justin Timberlake	
April 25	"Dead and Gone"	T.I. featuring Justin Timberlake	
May 2	"Blame It"	Jamie Foxx featuring T-Pain	
May 9	"Blame It"	Jamie Foxx featuring T-Pain	
May 16	"Blame It"	Jamie Foxx featuring T-Pain	
May 23	"Blame It"	Jamie Foxx featuring T-Pain	
May 30	"Boom Boom Pow"	The Black Eyed Peas	
June 6	"Boom Boom Pow"	The Black Eyed Peas	
June 13	"Boom Boom Pow"	The Black Eyed Peas	
June 20	"Boom Boom Pow"	The Black Eyed Peas	
June 27	"Boom Boom Pow"	The Black Eyed Peas	
July 4	"Knock You Down"	Keri Hilson featuring Kanye West and Ne-Yo	
July 11	"Knock You Down"	Keri Hilson featuring Kanye West and Ne-Yo	
July 18	"Knock You Down"	Keri Hilson featuring Kanye West and Ne-Yo	
July 25	"Knock You Down"	Keri Hilson featuring Kanye West and Ne-Yo	
August 1	"Knock You Down"	Keri Hilson featuring Kanye West and Ne-Yo	
August 8	"Best I Ever Had"	Drake	
August 15	"Best I Ever Had"	Drake	
August 22	"I Gotta Feeling"	The Black Eyed Peas	
August 29	"I Gotta Feeling"	The Black Eyed Peas	
September 5	"I Gotta Feeling"	The Black Eyed Peas	
September 12	"I Gotta Feeling"	The Black Eyed Peas	
September 19	"I Gotta Feeling"	The Black Eyed Peas	
September 26	"I Gotta Feeling"	The Black Eyed Peas	
October 3	"You Belong With Me"	Taylor Swift	
October 10	"You Belong With Me"	Taylor Swift	
October 17	"Down"	Jay Sean featuring Lil' Wayne	
October 24	"Down"	Jay Sean featuring Lil' Wayne	
October 31	"Down"	Jay Sean featuring Lil' Wayne	
November 7	"Down"	Jay Sean featuring Lil' Wayne	
November 14	"Down"	Jay Sean featuring Lil' Wayne	
November 21	"Paparazzi"	Lady Gaga	
November 28	"Empire State of Mind"	Jay-Z and Alicia Keys	
December 5	"Empire State of Mind"	Jay-Z and Alicia Keys	
December 12	"Empire State of Mind"	Jay-Z and Alicia Keys	
December 19	"Empire State of Mind"	Jay-Z and Alicia Keys	
December 26	"Empire State of Mind"	Jay-Z and Alicia Keys	

== Statistics ==
=== Artists by total number-one singles ===
Artist	Number-one singles
Usher	6
Beyoncé	5
50 Cent	5
Ludacris	5
Kanye West	5
Alicia Keys	4
T.I.	4
Destiny's Child	4
Sean Paul	4
Jennifer Lopez	4

=== Artists by total cumulative weeks at number one ===
Artist	Number-one singles
Usher	43
Beyoncé	36
Alicia Keys	35
T.I.	28
Mariah Carey	24
50 Cent	23
Nelly	23
Destiny's Child	22
Jay-Z	21
Ludacris	19

=== Songs by total number of weeks at number one ===
Song	Artist(s)	Weeks at number one
"We Belong Together"	Mariah Carey	16
"No One"	Alicia Keys	14
"Dilemma"	Nelly featuring Kelly Rowland	12
"Yeah!"	Usher featuring Lil Jon and Ludacris	12
"Lose Yourself"	Eminem	11
"Let Me Love You"	Mario	11
"Irreplaceable"	Beyoncé	11
"U Got It Bad"	Usher	10
"Foolish"	Ashanti	10
"Lollipop"	Lil' Wayne featuring Static Major	10

== See also ==
- 2000s in music
- List of Hot 100 number-one singles of the 2000s (U.S.)
