= DJ Dirty Harry =

DJ Dirty Harry a.k.a. George M. Harry is a DJ and record producer who co-produced Grammy Winning and ASCAP Award winning song "No One" by Alicia Keys on album As I Am. He was part of the in-house production for Keys' production company, Krucial Keys, and from 2004 -2005 was the head of the company's A&R division in addition to signing a deal with Universal Music Publishing. "No One" became a Hot 100 number-one single. The album went on to sell 5 million copies worldwide.

He also contributed to Jazmine Sullivan's Grammy Nominated album Fearless.

As a DJ, he gained notoriety from popular outlets such as Rolling Stone and picked up an XXL Annual Mixtape Awards nomination for Rap Phenomenon II, a popular mixtape collaboration he did with DJ Vlad and DJ Green Lantern.

Harry's mix-tapes became so popular on the streets of New York that artists and celebrities began collaborating with him, including 50 Cent, Sean "Diddy" Combs, Nas, LL Cool J, Run DMC, Lauryn Hill and Busta Rhymes.
