= Need You =

Need You may refer to:

- "Need You" (Sonny James song), 1967
- "Need U (100%)", a song by Duke Dumont, 2013
- "Need You", 2010 song by Travie McCoy from the album Lazarus
- "Need You", a song by Dillon Francis and Nghtmre, 2016
- "Need You", a song by Flight Facilities, 2018
- "Need You", a song by Nina Nesbitt from Älskar, 2022

== See also ==
- I Need You (disambiguation)
- Need Me (disambiguation)
