= Teenage Love Affair =

Single by Alicia Keys

from the album As I Am
- B-side: "I Need You"; "No One"; "Like You'll Never See Me Again"
- Released: May 13, 2008
- Studio: Henson (Los Angeles)
- Genre: R&B; soul
- Length: 3:10
- Label: J
- Songwriters: Alicia Keys; Jack Splash; Harold Lilly; Matthew Kahane; Josephine Bridges; Carl Hampton; Tom Nixon
- Producers: Alicia Keys; Jack Splash

Alicia Keys singles chronology
"Like You'll Never See Me Again" (2007)	"Teenage Love Affair" (2008)	"Superwoman" (2008)

Music video
- "Teenage Love Affair" on YouTube

"Teenage Love Affair" is a song recorded by American singer-songwriter Alicia Keys for her third studio album As I Am (2007). It was written by Keys, Jack Splash, Matthew Kahane, and Harold Lilly. The song was released as the third single from As I Am on May 13, 2008, by J Records.

A moderate commercial success, "Teenage Love Affair" peaked at number 54 on the US Billboard Hot 100 and number three on the Hot R&B/Hip-Hop Songs. Critically acclaimed, the song was ranked at number 23 on the "100 Best Songs of 2007" list published by Rolling Stone.

== Background and production ==
The track was produced by Keys and Splash and is based around a sample from The Temprees' 1972 song "(Girl) I Love You", written by Josephine Bridges, Carl Hampton, and Tom Nixon. The song ranked at number twenty-three on Rolling Stone's list of the 100 Best Songs of 2007, and was nominated for Song of the Year at the 2008 BET J Virtual Awards. It impacted mainstream urban radio on April 21, 2008. The song was a critical and commercial success in the US entering both the Billboard Hot 100 and Pop 100 charts and climbing to number three on the Billboard Hot R&B Songs chart. Keys performed the song on Late Show with David Letterman on April 29, 2008. Swizz Beatz produced a remix of "Teenage Love Affair" featuring LL Cool J, using a sample from Slick Rick's 1988 song "Teenage Love". After failing to pick up sufficient airplay in the UK, the physical single was canceled there and the song charted at number one hundred and ninety-nine.

== Music video ==
According to Keys' official website and official fan club, the music video for "Teenage Love Affair", directed by Chris Robinson and Andrew Young (with whom she had previously worked with on 2001's "Fallin'" and 2003's "You Don't Know My Name", among others), was filmed at Drew University in Madison, New Jersey. Derek Luke plays Keys' love interest, and Anthony Hamilton, Jackie Long, Albert Daniels, Tristan Wilds, and Tanisha Scott make cameo appearances in the video as well. The video is based on Spike Lee's 1988 film School Daze, starring Laurence Fishburne, Tisha Campbell-Martin, and Kyme, among others. The video premiered across America on April 23, 2008 on MTV's TRL. That same day, Keys also appeared on BET's 106 & Park to premiere the video. BET placed the video at number forty on Notarized: Top 100 Videos of 2008 while BET J placed it at number fourteen on the Soul Sessions Top 50 of 2008. Giancarlo Esposito, the actor who portrayed Dean Big Brother Almighty in School Daze, makes a cameo appearance in the beginning of the video.

=== Synopsis ===
Key's performing the song at the talent show with her backing dancers in the music video.

The music video starts off with Keys and Luke having a phone conversation. Then the video takes us back two weeks ago to when they first met. Two weeks prior, Luke, a male college student at Britton College is giving a speech about an epidemic in Africa. Then Keys, a female college student, joins the audience. Luke turns and stares at Keys, but does not finish his speech. Then everyone turns to Keys, realizing that she was Luke's distraction, and Luke finishes his speech. Then Keys and her friends (Sharaya J) are walking and dancing down a sidewalk on the college campus. The next part of the video shows Keys and Luke having a secret meeting on a staircase. Keys gives him a note, which is an invitation to the Britton College Talent Show later the same day. After that, Luke and his friends are playing cards. One of his friends reminds him about the talent show and Luke tells his friends that he has better things to do. Later that evening, Keys, in the talent show, is singing to the song with three back-up singers. Later that night, there is a pajama party at the college lounge.

Luke who is at the party with his friends, is watching a female college student dance. Then Keys and two of her friends walk in with large overcoats. Luke notices Keys before she notices him. Once she has spot Luke, she notices that he is looking at the dancing girl. They both give each other "dirty" looks while Luke is feeling ashamed. Then Keys opens her coat, revealing her pajama party outfit (a golden silk nightgown), and followed by her friends, they start to dance, while Keys starts dancing next to a male college student (Wilds) who laughs at Luke. Later that night, Luke is headed to his room when he runs into Keys, and they start dating. The end of the video takes us back to the beginning, where Keys and Luke are having their phone conversation, which is shortened.

== Track listings ==
- US promotional CD single
1. "Teenage Love Affair" (Radio Edit) – 3:30
2. "Teenage Love Affair" (Album Version) – 3:10
3. "Teenage Love Affair" (Call Out Hook) – 0:10
- European promotional CD single
1. "Teenage Love Affair" (Album Version) – 3:10
2. "Teenage Love Affair" (Instrumental) – 3:07
3. "Teenage Love Affair" (Call Out Hook) – 0:10
- Australian CD single
1. "Teenage Love Affair" (Album Version) – 3:10
2. "Teenage Love Affair" (Instrumental Version) – 3:07
- US 12" single

A1. "Teenage Love Affair" (Album Version) – 3:10
A2. "Teenage Love Affair" (Instrumental Version) – 3:07
B1. "I Need You" – 5:09
B2. "No One" (Salaam Remi Remix) (featuring Junior Reid) – 4:51

- US promotional 12" single (Remix)

A1. "Teenage Love Affair" (Part II) (Main Version) (featuring LL Cool J) – 3:14
A2. "Teenage Love Affair" (Part II) (Instrumental Version) – 3:13
B1. "Like You'll Never See Me Again" (Jony Rockstar Mix) – 3:51
B2. "Like You'll Never See Me Again (Original Remix) (featuring Ludacris) – 4:06

== Personnel ==
Musicians

- Alicia Keys – vocals

Production

- Alicia Keys – producer, vocal producer, vocal arrangement
- Jack Splash – producer, arranger, programming
- Ann Mincieli – engineer
- Glenn Pittmann – assistant engineer
- Manny Marroquin – mixing
- Jared Robbins – mix assistant

== Charts ==
=== Weekly charts ===
Weekly chart performance for "Teenage Love Affair"
Chart (2008)	Peak position
Belgium (Ultratip Bubbling Under Wallonia)	24
Netherlands (Dutch Top 40)	21
New Zealand (Recorded Music NZ)	21
Slovakia Airplay (ČNS IFPI)	95
UK Singles (OCC)	199
US Billboard Hot 100	54
US Hot R&B/Hip-Hop Songs (Billboard)	3
US Pop 100 (Billboard)	99
US Rhythmic Airplay (Billboard)	32

=== Year-end charts ===
Year-end chart performance for "Teenage Love Affair"
Chart (2008)	Position
US Hot R&B/Hip-Hop Songs (Billboard)	20

== Release history ==
Release dates and formats for "Teenage Love Affair"
Region	Date	Format(s)	Label(s)	Ref.
United States	May 13, 2008	Rhythmic contemporary radio	J	
United Kingdom	June 9, 2008	Digital download	J	
Australia	June 30, 2008	CD	Sony BMG	
United States	July 8, 2008	Contemporary hit radio	J	
