= As I Am =

2007 studio album by Alicia Keys

- Standard cover (Note: The Super Edition cover uses the same image as the standard and deluxe editions cover, except it is tinged purple with different typeface coloring.)

Studio album by Alicia Keys
- Released: November 9, 2007
- Recorded: 2005 – August 2007
- Studios: Conway (Los Angeles); Glenwood Place (Burbank); Henson (Los Angeles); Kung Fu Gardens (Los Angeles); Legacy (New York); Oven (Glen Cove); Pie (Glen Cove); Plus XXX (Paris)
- Genre: R&B
- Length: 56:04
- Label: J
- Producers: Mark Batson; Kerry "Krucial" Brothers; Alicia Keys; John Mayer; Linda Perry; Jack Splash

Alicia Keys chronology
Unplugged (2005)	As I Am (2007)	Remixed (2008)

Singles from As I Am
- 1. "No One" Released: September 10, 2007; 2. "Like You'll Never See Me Again" Released: January 22, 2008; 3. "Teenage Love Affair" Released: May 13, 2008; 4. "Superwoman" Released: July 29, 2008

As I Am is the third studio album by American singer and songwriter Alicia Keys. It was released on November 9, 2007, by J Records. Recording sessions for the album took place at various recording studios from 2005 until 2007. Production was handled primarily by Keys, Kerry Brothers Jr., Jack Splash, and Linda Perry, with a guest contribution from musician John Mayer.

Despite some criticism towards Keys' lyrics, As I Am received generally positive reviews from critics. It debuted at number one on the US Billboard 200, selling 742,000 copies in its first week, and was eventually certified quadruple platinum by the Recording Industry Association of America (RIAA). The album became an international commercial success, selling over five million copies worldwide. It spawned four singles, including "No One", which became the most-listened song of 2007 in the US. As I Am earned Keys several accolades, including three Grammy Awards and two American Music Awards.

== Background and development ==
Keys released her second studio album The Diary of Alicia Keys in December 2003. It debuted at number one on the US Billboard 200, selling over 618,000 copies its first week of release and scoring the largest first-week sales for a female artist in 2003. Certified quadruple platinum by the Recording Industry Association of America (RIAA), the album has sold 4.4 million copies in the United States and eight million worldwide. While attending the Cannes Film Festival in May 2004, it was announced that Keys intended to make her film debut in a biopic about biracial piano prodigy Philippa Schuyler. The film was to be co-produced by Halle Berry and Marc Platt; however, it has never come to fruition. Later that year, Keys released her novel Tears for Water: Songbook of Poems and Lyrics, a collection of unreleased poems from her journals and lyrics. The title derived from one of her poems, "Love and Chains" from the line: "I don't mind drinking my tears for water." She said the title is the foundation of her writing because "everything I have ever written has stemmed from my tears of joy, of pain, of sorrow, of depression, even of question". The book earned over US$500,000 from sales, with Keys making it into The New York Times Best Seller list in 2005. Keys performed and taped her installment of the MTV Unplugged series in July 2005 at the Brooklyn Academy of Music. During the session, Keys added new arrangements to her original songs and performed several covers. The session was released on CD and DVD in October 2005, titled Unplugged, and debuted at number one on the Billboard 200 chart with 196,000 units sold in its first week, registering the highest debut for an MTV Unplugged album since Nirvana's MTV Unplugged in New York (1994) and the first Unplugged by a female artist to debut at number one. The album has sold one million copies in the United States, where it was certified platinum by the RIAA, and two million copies worldwide.

In October 2006, she played the voice of Mommy Martian in the "Mission to Mars" episode of the children's television series The Backyardigans, in which she sang the original song "Almost Everything Is Boinga Here". That same year, Keys nearly suffered a mental breakdown, as her grandmother had died and her family was heavily dependent on her. She felt she needed to "escape" and went to Egypt for three weeks, explaining: "That trip was definitely the most crucial thing I've ever done for myself in my life to date. It was a very difficult time that I was dealing with, and it just came to the point where I really needed to—basically, I just needed to run away, honestly. And I needed to get as far away as possible." Keys made her film debut in the crime film Smokin' Aces (2006), co-starring as an assassin named Georgia Sykes opposite Ben Affleck and Andy García. Keys received much praise from her co-stars in the film; Ryan Reynolds called her "so natural" and said she would "blow everybody away". Smokin' Aces was a moderate hit at the box office, earning $57,103,895 worldwide during its theatrical run. In 2007, Keys earned further praise for her second film The Nanny Diaries, based on the 2002 novel of the same name, where she co-starred alongside Scarlett Johansson and Chris Evans. The Nanny Diaries had a hit moderate performance at the box office, earning only $44,638,886 worldwide during its theatrical run. She also guest starred as herself in the "One Man Is an Island" episode of the drama series Cane.

== Recording and production ==
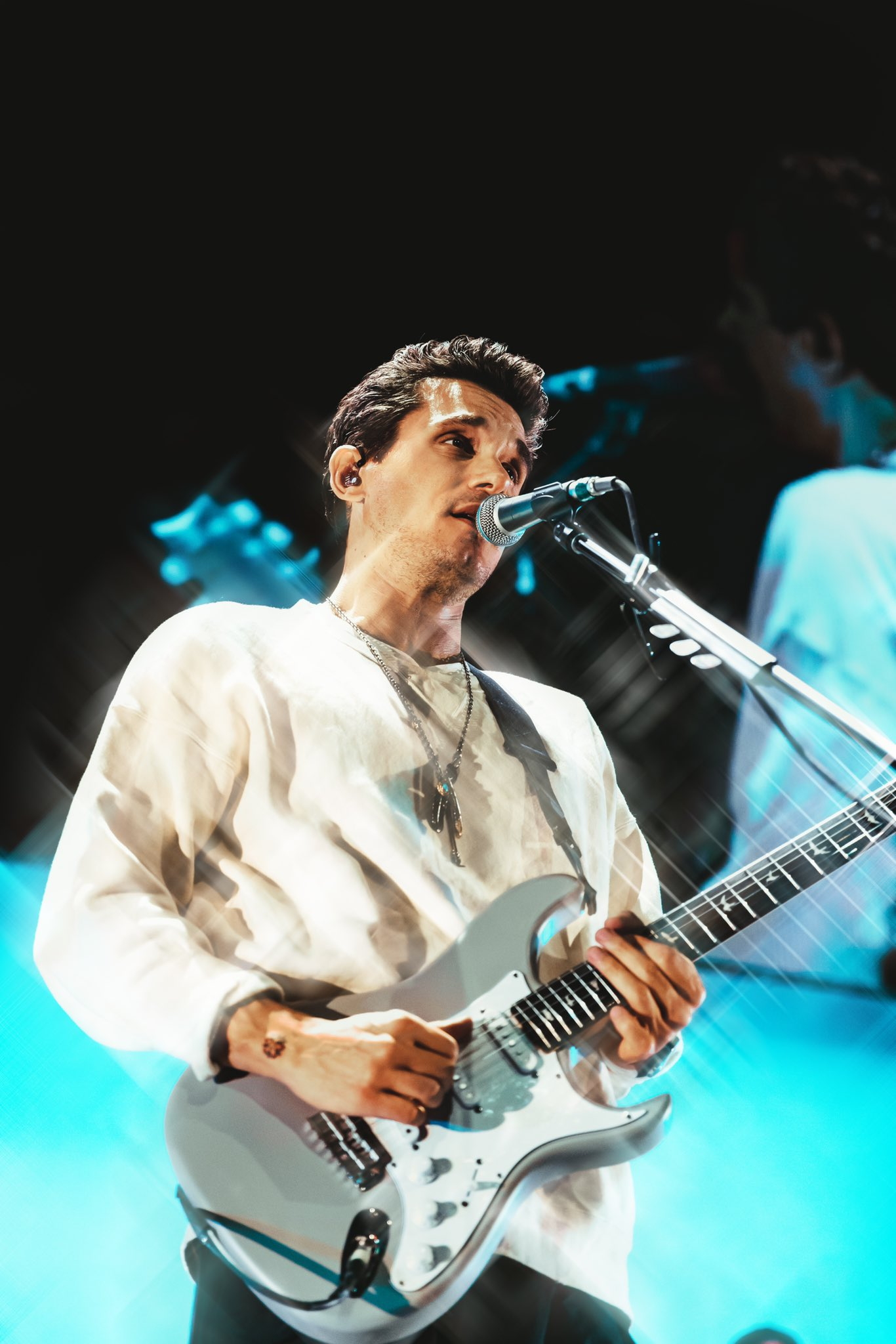
John Mayer (pictured) co-wrote, produced and was featured on "Lesson Learned".

Keys had been working on the album since late 2005, but focused on it to a greater extent in 2006. Keys opened a recording studio in Long Island, New York with her production and songwriting partner Kerry "Krucial" Brothers, called the Oven Studios, in which she recorded the majority of As I Am; the studio was designed by renowned studio architect John Storyk, who had previously designed Jimi Hendrix' Electric Lady Studios. Every track was recorded in the United States, except for the "As I Am" intro, which was recorded at the Plus XXX Studio in Paris. In December 2006, Keys told MTV News: "It's coming together incredibly. I am in love with this album. It's very fresh and new."

Other recording locations included Pie Studios in Glen Cove, Battery Studios, Legacy Recording Studios and The Mastering Palace in New York City, Glenwood Place Studios in Burbank, and Conway Recording Studios, Henson Recording Studios, Kung Fu Gardens and Larrabee North in Los Angeles. During the recording sessions, Keys decided to work on her own terms and take her time with finishing the album instead of following the label-set deadline, telling mixing engineer Manny Marroquin: "It'll be in when it's in. It's there when it's right, and that's when it's there." Producers who worked on the album include–apart from Keys and Brothers–Mark Batson, DJ Dirty Harry, John Mayer, Linda Perry and Jack Splash. After almost two years of recording, Keys confirmed As I Am had been finished the prior month at the 2007 MTV Video Music Awards on September 9, 2007.

During the recording of the album, Keys' paternal grandmother Vergil DiSalvatore fell terminally ill in 2006, which caused the recording sessions to be cut shorter since Keys took care of her. Keys later said: "Somebody extremely close to me got very ill, and I was really the only one that was able to help care for them. This person was strong and my rock, and then, totally, not even able to walk without assistance. I had no choice but to stop." DiSalvatore died the same year; her illness and death caused Keys to reconcile with her estranged father Craig Cook.

== Music and lyrics ==
"Like You'll Never See Me Again"
The ballad received comparisons from music critics to the music of Prince.

As I Am is predominantly a soul and R&B album, exploring genres such as jazz, hip hop and soft rock. It departs the urban contemporary sound of its predecessor The Diary of Alicia Keys (2003) in favor of 1970s–1980s-influenced traditional soul. Its lyrical themes include situations and complexities in relationships, as well as dealing with loss and life transience. The album opens with the "As I Am" intro, a piano-driven instrumental track. The following track, hip hop beat-infused "Go Ahead", sees its protagonist confronting a deceitful lover. On "Superwoman", the third track, Keys sings about being a "superwoman" regardless of her state or what she might be going through. Keys stated in an interview with MTV that "Superwoman" is her favorite track from As I Am, saying: "Every time I sing it, it makes me feel inspired to be however I am that day." The fourth track "No One" is an R&B sentimental ballad about Keys' unstoppable love for her partner. Keys told MTV Canada that the song "is really talking about the way that in relationships, the way that so many things are around you all the time to try to distract you. And even though people may talk and say whatever they may want to say, but then no one can get in the way of this." She also said that it was a song which "just wrote itself" and that it was one of the final songs written for the album. "Like You'll Never See Me Again" is a soul-R&B ballad which, according to Keys, is "about living every moment as if it's your last. Because if it's our last time to say, 'I love you,' then let it be that we didn't forget that." "Lesson Learned", a soul and soft rock track, features John Mayer on guitar and background vocals.

The seventh track "Wreckless Love" is a drum and horn-infused hip hop and jazz track speaking about its protagonist's desire for a "crazy love". "The Thing About Love" features Keys singing about different sides of romantic relationships: "Everybody laughs / Everybody cries / Sure it could hurt you baby but / Give it a lil' try". "Teenage Love Affair" was constructed around a sample of The Temprees' 1972 song "(Girl) I Love You", written by Josephine Bridges, Carl Hampton, and Tom Nixon, and speaks about an adolescent relationship. The guitar-driven "I Need You" is the album's tenth track and is followed by "Where Do We Go from Here", which samples "After Laughter (Comes Tears)" by Wendy Rene. "Prelude to a Kiss" is a piano-driven interlude about needing God's guidance through life, and serves as a prelude to "Tell You Something (Nana's Reprise)", a ballad inspired by the death of Keys' grandmother. The album closes with "Sure Looks Good to Me", a soft rock and gospel track about life transience. UK and Japanese editions of As I Am include the uptempo bonus track "Waiting for Your Love", while the Japanese limited edition's bonus disc includes a cover of "Hurt So Bad" by Little Anthony and the Imperials. The Super Edition of the album includes three bonus tracks: "Another Way to Die",–alternative rock duet with Jack White and theme song of the 2008 film Quantum of Solace–"Doncha Know (Sky Is Blue)" and "Saviour".

== Title and artwork ==
Keys first mentioned the album's title to E! News reporter Giuliana Rancic on June 26, 2007, at the BET Awards 2007 red carpet pre-show. In an interview for The New York Times during the album's production, Keys said the album was titled As I Am because she had grown far more straightforward in years preceding the album, stating: "I was becoming a very hidden person. I would just always try to keep everything even keeled and cool and just smooth everything over. That mask was getting very scary. And I didn't like it", adding: "I'm done with being a person that doesn't understand themselves because it's being detrimental to my health and my spirit and my mind. Everybody's in trouble now because I will tell it like it is."

Photos for the album's cover artwork and booklet were photographed by Thierry Le Gouès. The cover artwork features a black-and-white close-up shot of Keys looking straight into the camera; The Super Edition cover is the same but it's tinged purple.

== Release and promotion ==
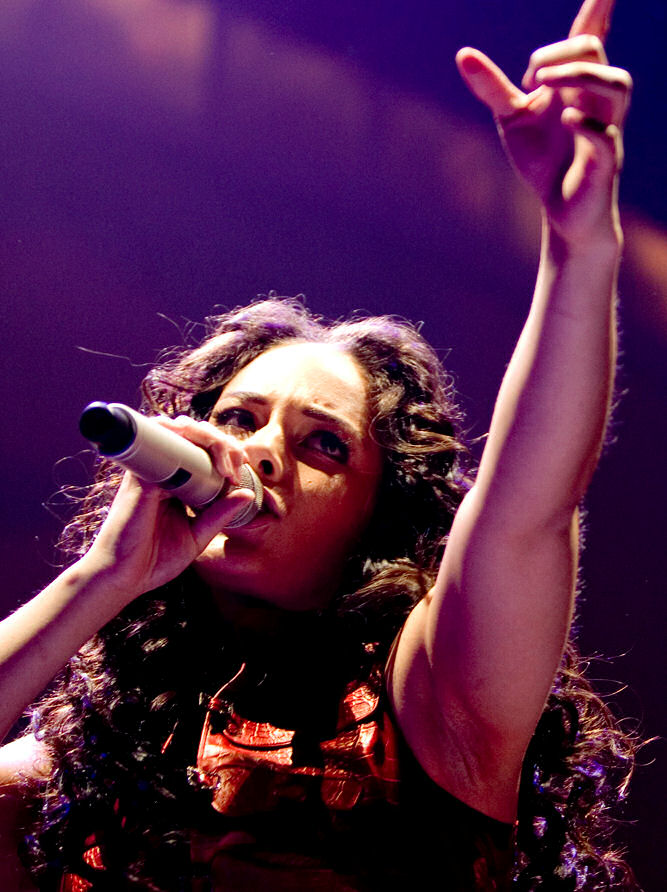
Keys performing in 2008

At Live Earth 2007's New Jersey concert on July 7, 2007, Keys performed then-unreleased "The Thing About Love", among other songs. Keys started the promotion of As I Am by performing a medley of the lead single "No One" and George Michael's "Freedom! '90" at the 2007 MTV Video Music Awards on September 9. The album was heavily promoted, and special advertising was arranged in collaboration with MTV before and during the week of release. The entire album was streamed on MTV's website, beginning on November 6, 2007, a week before the album's North American release date. Additionally, Keys was featured as MTV's Artist of the Week for the week beginning November 12, 2007. As I Am was first released on November 9 in Germany; its CD+DVD deluxe edition was released simultaneously outside North America. MTV commissioned Evan Silver to direct a series of nine humorous advertisements featuring Keys being harassed by someone in a bunny costume; in the final spot, the bunny is revealed to be John Mayer.

Keys performed the album's first two singles "No One" and "Like You'll Never See Me Again" along with "If I Ain't Got You" on Good Morning America on November 13, and with "Fallin'" on the November 20 episode of The Early Show. On November 18, Keys performed "No One" with Junior Reid, Beenie Man and Chaka Demus and Pliers at the American Music Awards of 2007 at the Nokia Theatre L.A. Live in Los Angeles. Keys also performed "No One" at the 2007 Nobel Peace Prize concert at the Oslo Spektrum on December 11, and the 50th Annual Grammy Awards on February 10. At the Super Bowl XLII pre-game show on February 3, 2008, Keys performed "Go Ahead", "Fallin'", "If I Ain't Got You", "Teenage Love Affair" and "No One". She later performed "Teenage Love Affair" on the Late Show with David Letterman on April 29, and "The Thing About Love" on November 11. Keys performed "Superwoman" on Wetten, dass..? in Germany on November 8, and, with Queen Latifah and Kathleen Battle, at the American Music Awards of 2008 on November 23. The album was reissued on November 10, 2008, outside North America, subtitled The Super Edition, to include three bonus tracks–including "Another Way to Die", Keys' collaboration with Jack White for the 2008 film Quantum of Solace–and a bonus DVD. Furthermore, Keys embarked on the As I Am Tour in support of As I Am; the tour started in Birmingham, England on February 28, 2008, and ended on December 20 in Swan Valley, Australia.

== Singles ==
"No One" was released as the album's lead single on September 10, 2007. It peaked at number one on the US Billboard Hot 100, becoming Keys' third number-one single on the chart, and peaked within the top ten in almost all international markets. Additionally, "No One" won two Grammy Awards in 2008–for Best R&B Song and Best Female R&B Vocal Performance. On August 19, 2020, the song was certified septuple platinum by the Recording Industry Association of America (RIAA) for shipping seven million units.

"Like You'll Never See Me Again" was released as the second single on January 22, 2008. It peaked at 12 on the Billboard Hot 100 and number one on the Hot R&B/Hip-Hop Songs chart. In 2008, the song won two NAACP Image Awards–for Outstanding Music Video and Outstanding Song, as well as an ASCAP Rhythm & Soul Music Award for Top R&B/Hip-Hop Song the following year. The song was certified platinum by the RIAA on August 11, 2020, for shipping one million units.

"Teenage Love Affair" was released as the third single on March 31, 2008. It peaked at number 54 on the Billboard Hot 100 and number three on the Hot R&B/Hip-Hop Songs.

"Superwoman" was released as the fourth and final single on July 29, 2008. It peaked at number 82 on the Billboard Hot 100 and number 12 on the Hot R&B/Hip-Hop Songs. It also won a Grammy Award for Best Female R&B Vocal Performance in 2009. On August 19, 2020, the song was certified gold by the RIAA for shipping 500,000 units.

== Critical reception ==
Professional ratings
Aggregate scores
Source	Rating
Metacritic	66/100
Review scores
Source	Rating
AllMusic	3/5 stars
Blender	4/5 stars
Entertainment Weekly	B
The Guardian	2/5 stars
NME	3/5 stars
Q	2/5 stars
Rolling Stone	3/5 stars
Spin	4/5 stars
The Times	3/5 stars
USA Today	3/4 stars

As I Am received generally positive reviews from critics. At Metacritic, which assigns a normalized rating out of 100 to reviews from mainstream publications, the album received an average score of 66, based on 22 reviews. Jon Pareles of Blender felt that the album "advances" from her previous two albums "by showing an experimental side." Spin commented that Keys' songwriting has improvement from her previous work. In a rave review of the album, Gregory Stephen Tate of The Village Voice praised Keys for her vintage soul influence and called As I Am a "complete work". NME perceived the album as a departure from Keys' previous albums and described it as "streetwise, smoky set of real soul". Entertainment Weekly's Neil Drumming described it as "Keys' most polished – if, at times, edgeless – album to date". Slant Magazine's Sal Cinquemani wrote that "Keys isn't quite a superwoman come to save R&B from itself, but the timeless quality of As I Am is right on time." USA Today called it Keys' "most cohesive studio album". Nate Chinen of The New York Times stated "As I Am radiates not just confidence but also experience", and called it Keys' "strongest effort yet". According to The Star-Ledger the album is "another solid effort" but "not the masterpiece that Keys seems capable of producing, someday".

Keys' songwriting on the album received negative criticism from The Washington Post's J. Freedom du Lac, who called As I Am "disappointing" and wrote that it "reveals her considerable limitations as a lyricist". Dorian Lynskey of The Guardian called Keys "crashingly dull... her vaunted self-belief seemingly leaves no room for vulnerability, humour, insight or any of the other qualities possessed by the soul giants to whose stature she aspires". Writing for Rolling Stone, critic Robert Christgau found the album's prevailing mood "reflectively soulful and the prevailing tempo mid". In his consumer guide, Christgau gave it a one-star honorable mention and quipped, "Nice girl holds out," while citing "Teenage Love Affair" and "Wreckless Love" as highlights. Despite commending the album for its "more traditional soul" and pop-oriented sound, The Observer writer Stephanie Merritt perceived Keys' lyrics as a significant fault and wrote "for the most part, the lyrics are so reliant on stock phrases – 'feel your touch', 'hold me', 'shoulda known', etc – that you could read anything you like into them without them carrying any personal feeling at all". Chicago Tribune writer Greg Kot felt that the "main problem is that Keys' songwriting has yet to transcend her obvious influences". Marisa Brown of AllMusic also viewed its lyrical quality as a weakness, but stated, "even though As I Am is a flawed work – a little too poppy, a little too clichéd – it is also indicative of what Keys can and will do".

== Accolades ==
The album was number 36 on Rolling Stone's list of the Top 50 Albums of 2007. The song "Teenage Love Affair" was number 23 on Rolling Stone's list of the 100 Best Songs of 2007. As I Am received two Grammy Awards for the song "No One" at the 2008 ceremony for Best Female R&B Vocal Performance and Best R&B Song. The following year, she won the award for Best Female R&B Vocal Performance for "Superwoman" and received two more nominations for Best Pop Collaboration with Vocals for "Lesson Learned" along with John Mayer and Best Short Form Music Video for "Another Way to Die" along with Jack White at the 2009 Grammy Awards.

The album won a 2008 NAACP Image Award for Outstanding Album, while "Like You'll Never See Me Again" won for Outstanding Song and Outstanding Music Video. At the 2009 NAACP Image Awards, the "Superwoman" was nominated for Outstanding Song and Outstanding Music Video; it lost both categories to will.i.am's "Yes We Can". "Like You'll Never See Me Again" was nominated for the BET Award for Video of the Year in 2008. The album won two 2008 American Music Awards for Favorite Pop/Rock Album and Favorite Soul/R&B Album. As I Am received a nomination for Album of the Year at the MTV Europe Music Awards 2008. In 2008, Entertainment Weekly ranked it number 33 in its Best Albums of the Past 25 Years list. The album ranked at number 30 on Rolling Stone's list of "Women Who Rock: The 50 Greatest Albums of All Time" in 2012. In August 2025, the album was ranked at number 71 on Billboard's list of Top R&B/Hip-Hop Albums of the 21st Century.

== Commercial performance ==
As I Am debuted at number one on the US Billboard 200 with 742,000 copies sold in its first week, then the largest amount for any female artist since Norah Jones' Feels Like Home sold one million copies in its opening week in 2004, while becoming Keys' fourth consecutive number-one album on the chart. The following week, the album dropped to number two on the chart, selling an additional 349,000 copies. In its third week, it fell to number three, with 257,400 copies sold. It was ranked the best-selling album overall and the best-selling R&B album of 2008 in the United States by Billboard, while its lead single, "No One", became the most listened-to song in the country that same year. In late 2009, it was ranked the 76th best-selling album of the decade in the US. On August 11, 2020, the album was certified quadruple platinum by the Recording Industry Association of America (RIAA) for combined sales and album-equivalent units of over four million units in the United States.

Internationally, As I Am reached number one in South Africa and Switzerland, as well as the top five in Australia, Canada, France, Italy, Japan, the Netherlands, New Zealand, and Portugal, and the top ten in Austria, Croatia, Germany, and Poland. By May 2008, the album had sold over five million copies worldwide.

== Track listing ==
As I Am
No.	Title	Writer(s)	Producer(s)	Length
1.	"As I Am" (Intro)	Alicia Keys	Keys; Kerry "Krucial" Brothers	1:52
2.	"Go Ahead"	Keys; Mark Batson; Kerry Brothers Jr.; Marsha Ambrosius	Keys; Batson	4:35
3.	"Superwoman"	Keys; Linda Perry; Steve Mostyn	Keys; Brothers	4:34
4.	"No One"	Keys; Brothers; George M. Harry	Keys; Brothers; Dirty Harry^{[a]}	4:13
5.	"Like You'll Never See Me Again"	Keys; Brothers	Keys; Brothers^{[a]}	5:15
6.	"Lesson Learned" (featuring John Mayer)	Keys; Mayer	Keys; Mayer	4:13
7.	"Wreckless Love"	Keys; Jack Splash; Harold Lilly	Keys; Splash	3:52
8.	"The Thing About Love"	Keys; Perry	Keys; Perry	3:49
9.	"Teenage Love Affair"	Keys; Splash; Lilly; Josephine Bridges; Carl Hampton; Tom Nixon	Keys; Splash	3:10
10.	"I Need You"	Keys; Batson; Lilly; Paul L. Green	Keys; Batson	5:09
11.	"Where Do We Go from Here"	Keys; Brothers; Lilly; Mary Frierson; Johnnie Frierson	Keys; Brothers	4:10
12.	"Prelude to a Kiss"	Keys	Keys	2:07
13.	"Tell You Something (Nana's Reprise)"	Keys; Novel Stevenson; Ron Haney; Brothers; Green; Mostyn	Keys; Brothers	4:28
14.	"Sure Looks Good to Me"	Keys; Perry	Keys; Perry	4:31
Total length:				55:58

Japanese and UK edition
No.	Title	Writer(s)	Producer(s)	Length
15.	"Waiting for Your Love"	Keys; Kaseem Dean; Sean Garrett; Wynton Marsalis	Keys	3:48
Total length:				59:46

The Super edition
No.	Title	Writer(s)	Producer(s)	Length
15.	"Another Way to Die" (with Jack White)	White	White	4:24
16.	"Doncha Know (Sky Is Blue)"	Keys; Perry	Keys; Perry	4:24
17.	"Saviour"	Keys; Splash; Lilly; Green	Keys; Splash	3:22
Total length:				68:08

=== Notes ===
- ^{^[a]} signifies a co-producer
- North American deluxe edition pressings include the music video for "No One" and behind-the-scenes footage.
- International deluxe edition pressings include a bonus DVD containing live performances of "Karma", "Heartburn", and "Wake Up" at the Hollywood Bowl, alongside behind-the-scenes footage for the album photo shoot and the "No One" video shoot.
- Japanese limited edition pressings include a bonus disc containing "Waiting for Your Love", the cover of "Hurt So Bad" by Little Anthony and the Imperials, (Note: produced by Alicia Keys) live version of "Superwoman", and the Curtis Lynch Reggae Remix of and the music video for "No One".
- The Super edition pressings include a bonus DVD containing live performances of "You Don't Know My Name", "Superwoman", "No One", "Teenage Love Affair", and "If I Ain't Got You" at The Coronet in London.

Sample credits

- "Teenage Love Affair" contains a portion of "(Girl) I Love You" by The Temprees.
- "Where Do We Go from Here" contains a portion of "After Laughter (Comes Tears)" by Wendy Rene.

== Personnel ==
Credits adapted from the liner notes of As I Am.

=== Musicians ===
- Alicia Keys – piano (tracks 1–6, 8, 13); Wurlitzer (tracks 1–3, 10, 13); harpsichord (track 1); virtual synths (tracks 1, 3, 5, 13); vocals (tracks 2–4, 8, 10, 14); Rhodes (tracks 3, 10, 13); Mellotron (tracks 3, 4); Moog, synth bass (track 3); horn arrangements (tracks 3, 10); Jupiter synth, vocoder (track 4); programmed strings (tracks 4, 5, 13); lead vocals (tracks 5–7, 11, 13); lead Moog (track 5); background vocals (tracks 6, 7, 11, 13, 14); vocal arrangements (tracks 7, 9)
- Kerry "Krucial" Brothers – programmed drums (tracks 1, 3–5, 8, 11, 13); horn arrangements (track 11)
- Mark Batson – clavinet (tracks 2, 10, 11); Moog bass (tracks 2, 3); programmed strings (track 2); programmed drums (tracks 2, 10); B-3 organ (tracks 3, 11); piano (track 10; horn arrangements (tracks 10, 11)
- Trevor Lawrence Jr. – live drums (tracks 2, 3, 8, 10, 13, 14); percussion (track 10)
- Steve Mostyn – bass guitar (tracks 3–5, 10, 11, 13, 14); acoustic guitar (tracks 4, 10)
- Mark Robohm – live drums (track 3)
- Ray Chew – horn arrangements (track 3)
- Jumaane Smith – trumpet lead (track 3)
- Duane Eubanks – trumpet #2 (track 3)
- Ryan Keberle – tenor trombone (track 3)
- Michael Dease – tenor trombone, bass trombone (track 3)
- David Watson – tenor saxophone (track 3)
- Darryl Dixon – alto saxophone (track 3)
- Carl Maraghi – baritone saxophone (track 3)
- Jason Sugata – French horn (track 3)
- John "Jubu" Smith – lead guitar, rhythm guitar (track 5); guitar (track 13)
- John Mayer – background vocals, lead guitar, rhythm guitar (track 6)
- David Ryan Harris – guitar #2 (track 6)
- Sean Hurley – bass guitar (track 6)
- Steve Jordan – live drums (track 6)
- Jack Splash – instrument arrangements, instrument programming (tracks 7, 9)
- Paul L. Green – background vocals (tracks 7, 13)
- Harold Lilly – background vocals (track 7)
- John Salvatore Scaglione – lead guitar, rhythm guitar (track 8)
- Paul Ill – bass guitar (tracks 8, 14)
- Damon Fox – B-3 organ (tracks 8, 14); Mellotron (track 8); Moog synth (track 14)
- Harry Kim – trombone (tracks 10, 11)
- David G. Stout – trumpet (tracks 10, 11)
- Everette K. Harp – saxophone (tracks 10, 11)
- Novel Stevenson – background vocals (track 13)
- Ron Haney – guitar (track 13)
- Linda Perry – background vocals, piano (track 14)
- Peter Thorn – guitar (track 14)

=== Technical ===
- Alicia Keys – production (all tracks); vocal production (tracks 7, 9); executive production
- Kerry "Krucial" Brothers – production (tracks 1, 3, 4, 11, 13); co-production (track 5); executive production
- Ann Mincieli – engineering, recording (all tracks); vocal recording (track 14); album coordination
- Vincent Creusot – engineering assistance (track 1)
- Manny Marroquin – mixing (all tracks); engineering (track 8)
- Jared Robbins – mix assistance (tracks 1–11, 13)
- Mark Batson – production (tracks 2, 10)
- Brendan Dekora – engineering assistance (tracks 2, 4, 7, 8, 10, 11, 13, 14)
- Glen Pittman – engineering assistance (tracks 2, 9–11)
- Keith Gretlein – engineering assistance (tracks 2, 10)
- Zach Hancock – engineering assistance (tracks 2–5, 10, 13, 14)
- Seth Waldmann – engineering assistance (tracks 2, 3, 5, 6, 10, 13, 14)
- Christian Baker – additional mix assistance (tracks 2, 10)
- Stuart White – engineering assistance (tracks 3, 4, 13, 14); additional engineering (track 8)
- Seamus Tyson – engineering assistance (tracks 3, 6)
- Dirty Harry – co-production (track 4)
- John Mayer – production (track 6)
- Chad Franscoviak – additional engineering (track 6)
- Jack Splash – production (tracks 7, 9)
- Linda Perry – production, engineering (tracks 8, 14)
- Andrew Chavez – Pro Tools engineering (track 14)
- Kristofer Kaufman – engineering assistance (track 14)
- Jeff Robinson – executive production
- Peter Edge – executive production
- Dave Kutch – mastering

=== Artwork ===
- Thierry Le Gouès – photography
- Alli Truch – art direction, design
- Kim Biggs – art direction, design
- Chris LeBeau – creative production

== Charts ==
=== Weekly charts ===
2007–2008 weekly chart performance
Chart	Peak position
Australian Albums (ARIA)	3
Australian Urban Albums (ARIA)	2
Austrian Albums (Ö3 Austria)	9
Belgian Albums (Ultratop Flanders)	10
Belgian Albums (Ultratop Wallonia)	5
Canadian Albums (Billboard)	2
Croatian Albums (HDU)	4
Czech Albums (ČNS IFPI)	35
Danish Albums (Hitlisten)	21
Dutch Albums (Album Top 100)	2
European Top 100 Albums (Billboard)	3
Finnish Albums (Suomen virallinen lista)	24
French Albums (SNEP)	5
German Albums (Offizielle Top 100)	6
Greek International Albums (IFPI)	9
Irish Albums (IRMA)	15
Italian Albums (FIMI)	3
Japanese Albums (Oricon)	4
Mexican Albums (Top 100 Mexico)	58
New Zealand Albums (RMNZ)	5
Norwegian Albums (VG-lista)	20
Polish Albums (ZPAV)	7
Portuguese Albums (AFP)	4
Scottish Albums (Official Charts)	11
South African Albums (RISA)	1
Spanish Albums (Promusicae)	12
Swedish Albums (Sverigetopplistan)	15
Swiss Albums (Schweizer Hitparade)	1
Taiwanese Albums (Five Music)	2
UK Albums (Official Charts)	11
UK R&B Albums (Official Charts)	2
US Billboard 200	1
US Top R&B/Hip-Hop Albums (Billboard)	1

=== Monthly charts ===
2007 monthly chart performance
Chart	Peak position
South Korean International Albums (RIAK)	15

=== Year-end charts ===
2007 year-end chart performance
Chart	Position
Australian Albums (ARIA)	63
Australian Urban Albums (ARIA)	8
Belgian Albums (Ultratop Wallonia)	93
Dutch Albums (Album Top 100)	29
French Albums (SNEP)	39
Italian Albums (FIMI)	49
Swiss Albums (Schweizer Hitparade)	19
UK Albums (OCC)	99
Worldwide Albums (IFPI)	7

2008 year-end chart performance
Chart	Position
Australian Albums (ARIA)	43
Australian Urban Albums (ARIA)	4
Belgian Albums (Ultratop Flanders)	36
Belgian Albums (Ultratop Wallonia)	23
Canadian Albums (Billboard)	10
Dutch Albums (Album Top 100)	35
European Top 100 Albums (Billboard)	16
French Albums (SNEP)	85
German Albums (Offizielle Top 100)	77
Italian Albums (FIMI)	84
Swiss Albums (Schweizer Hitparade)	32
UK Albums (OCC)	109
US Billboard 200	1
US Top R&B/Hip-Hop Albums (Billboard)	1

2009 year-end chart performance
Chart	Position
Australian Urban Albums (ARIA)	29

=== Decade-end charts ===
2000s decade-end chart performance
Chart	Position
US Billboard 200	76
US Top R&B/Hip-Hop Albums (Billboard)	27

=== Centurial charts ===
21st century chart performance
Chart	Position
US Billboard 200	82
US Top R&B/Hip-Hop Albums (Billboard)	71

=== All-time charts ===
All-time chart performance
Chart	Position
US Billboard 200	128
US Billboard 200 (Women)	36

== Certifications ==
Certifications and sales
Region	Certification	Certified units/sales
Australia (ARIA)	Platinum	70,000^{^}
Austria (IFPI Austria)	Gold	10,000^{*}
Belgium (BRMA)	Gold	15,000^{*}
Canada (Music Canada)	2× Platinum	200,000^{^}
France (SNEP)	Platinum	200,000^{*}
Germany (BVMI)	Platinum	200,000^{^}
Ireland (IRMA)	Gold	7,500^{^}
Italy	—	100,000
Japan (RIAJ)	Gold	100,000^{^}
Netherlands (NVPI)	Gold	35,000^{^}
New Zealand (RMNZ)	2× Platinum	30,000^{‡}
Poland (ZPAV)	Platinum	20,000^{*}
Portugal (AFP)	Platinum	20,000^{^}
Russia (NFPF)	Gold	10,000^{*}
South Korea	—	2,181
Spain (Promusicae)	Gold	40,000^{^}
Switzerland (IFPI Switzerland)	Platinum	30,000^{^}
United Kingdom (BPI)	2× Platinum	600,000^{‡}
United States (RIAA)	5× Platinum	5,000,000^{‡}
Summaries
Europe (IFPI)	Platinum	1,000,000^{*}
Worldwide	—	5,000,000
^{*} Sales figures based on certification alone.^{^} Shipments figures based on certification alone.^{‡} Sales+streaming figures based on certification alone.

== Release history ==
Release dates and formats
Region	Date	Edition(s)	Format(s)	Label(s)	Ref.
Germany	November 9, 2007	Standard; deluxe	CD; CD + DVD	Sony BMG	
France	November 12, 2007	Standard; deluxe	CD; CD + DVD	Jive	
South Korea	November 12, 2007	Standard	CD	Sony BMG	
Canada	November 13, 2007	Standard; deluxe	CD; enhanced CD	Sony BMG	
United States	November 13, 2007	Standard; deluxe	CD; digital download; enhanced CD; vinyl	J	
Australia	November 17, 2007	Standard; deluxe	CD; CD + DVD	Sony BMG	
United Kingdom	November 19, 2007	Standard; deluxe	CD; CD + DVD; digital download	J	
Japan	November 21, 2007	Standard; limited	CD; CD + enhanced CD	BMG Japan	
Brazil	March 1, 2008	Standard	CD; digital download	Sony BMG	
Germany	November 7, 2008	Super	CD + DVD	Sony	
France	November 10, 2008	Super	CD + DVD	Jive	
United Kingdom	November 10, 2008	Super	CD + DVD	J	
Australia	November 15, 2008	Super	CD + DVD	Sony	
Japan	November 26, 2008	Super	CD + DVD	Sony Japan	

== See also ==
- Album era
- List of Billboard 200 number-one albums of 2007
- List of Billboard 200 number-one albums of 2008
- List of Billboard number-one R&B albums of 2007
- List of Billboard number-one R&B albums of 2008
- List of Billboard Year-End number-one singles and albums
