= Superwoman (Alicia Keys song) =

Single by Alicia Keys

from the album As I Am
- B-side: "Teenage Love Affair"
- Released: July 29, 2008
- Studio: Oven; Pie (Glen Cove); Legacy (New York City); Conway (Los Angeles)
- Genre: Soul; R&B
- Length: 4:34 (album version); 4:04 (radio edit)
- Label: J
- Songwriters: Alicia Keys; Linda Perry; Steve Mostyn
- Producers: Alicia Keys; Kerry "Krucial" Brothers

Alicia Keys singles chronology
"Teenage Love Affair" (2008)	"Superwoman" (2008)	"Another Way to Die" (2008)

Music video
- "Superwoman" on YouTube

"Superwoman" is a song recorded by American singer-songwriter Alicia Keys for her third studio album As I Am (2007). Written by Keys, Linda Perry, and Steve Mostyn, it was released as the fourth and final single from As I Am on July 29, 2008, by J Records.

Critically acclaimed, "Superwoman" earned Keys her second consecutive Grammy Award for Best Female R&B Vocal Performance, at the 2009 ceremony, and was also nominated for Outstanding Music Video and Outstanding Song at the 40th NAACP Image Awards.

== Song information ==
Keys stated in an interview with MTV that "Superwoman" is her favorite track of the album, saying: "Every time I sing it, it makes me feel inspired to be however I am that day." "Superwoman" is also the opening song on the WNBA games which features a video of Keys performing the song in one of her concerts along with shot of women playing in the WNBA. The song debuted in the U.S. on the Hot R&B/Hip-Hop Songs chart week of August 14, 2008, at number fifty-five, eventually peaking at number twelve. Keys performed the song with Queen Latifah and Kathleen Battle at the 2008 American Music Awards on November 23.

== Music video ==
The music video for "Superwoman" was filmed on June 9–10, 2008 at Quixote Studios and Center Studios in Los Angeles. It was directed by Chris Robinson, who had previously worked on other videos with Keys, like her MTV Video Music Award-winning video "Karma" and her previous single "Teenage Love Affair".

Keys plays many roles of women at their best strength and effort. Throughout the course of the video, she embodies a young mother applying for a university, an African woman, a businesswoman, a Cleopatra-like pharaoh, and an astronaut. Jada Pinkett Smith was also in the video, along with her son Jaden. The music video premiered exclusively on July 15, 2008 on Keys' official website. It was ranked number seventy-one on BET's Notarized: Top 100 Videos of 2008.

== Track listings ==
- US promotional CD single
1. "Superwoman" (Radio Edit) – 4:04
2. "Superwoman" (Call Out Hook) – 0:10
- European / Australian CD single
1. "Superwoman" (Radio Version) – 4:04
2. "Superwoman" (Live Version) – 4:02
- European CD Maxi-single
1. "Superwoman" (Radio Version) – 4:04
2. "Superwoman" (Live) – 4:02
3. "Teenage Love Affair" (Part II) (featuring LL Cool J) – 4:11
4. "Superwoman" (Video)

== Credits and personnel ==
=== Musicians ===
- Alicia Keys – vocals, piano, Fender Rhodes, Wurlitzer, Mellotron, Moog, bass synthesizer, virtual synthesizers
- Mark Batson – Hammond B3, Moog bass
- Steve Mostyn – bass guitar
- Trevor Lawrence Jr. – live drums
- Mark Robohm – live drums
- Jumaane Smith – trumpet lead
- Duane Eubanks – trumpet #2
- Ryan Keberle – tenor trombone
- Michael Dease – tenor trombone, bass trombone
- David Watson – tenor saxophone
- Darryl Dixon – alto saxophone
- Carl Maraghi – baritone saxophone
- Jason Sugata – French horn

=== Production ===
- Alicia Keys – producer, horn arrangements
- Kerry "Krucial" Brothers – producer, drum programming
- Ray Chew – horn arrangements
- Ann Mincieli – engineer
- Stuart White – assistant engineer
- Zach Hancock – assistant engineer
- Seth Waldmann – assistant engineer
- Seamus Tyson – assistant engineer
- Manny Marroquin – mixing
- Jared Robbins – mix assistant

== Charts ==
=== Weekly charts ===
Chart (2008)	Peak position
Australia (ARIA)	57
Austria (Ö3 Austria Top 40)	43
Germany (GfK)	43
Japan (Japan Hot 100)	27
Netherlands (Dutch Top 40)	28
Netherlands (Single Top 100)	75
Sweden (Sverigetopplistan)	32
Switzerland (Schweizer Hitparade)	48
UK Singles (OCC)	128
US Billboard Hot 100	82
US Hot R&B/Hip-Hop Songs (Billboard)	12

=== Year-end charts ===
Chart (2008)	Position
US Hot R&B/Hip-Hop Songs (Billboard)	70

== Certifications ==
Region	Certification	Certified units/sales
United States (RIAA)	Gold	500,000^{‡}
^{‡} Sales+streaming figures based on certification alone.

== Release history ==
Release dates and formats for "Superwoman"
Region	Date	Format(s)	Label(s)	Ref.
United States	July 29, 2008	Digital download (EP); rhythmic contemporary radio	J	
United States	August 26, 2008	Contemporary hit radio	J	
Australia	September 1, 2008	CD	Sony BMG	
Australia	September 15, 2008	Digital download	Sony BMG	
Germany	September 19, 2008	CD; maxi CD	Sony BMG	
