= No One (Alicia Keys song) =

2007 single by Alicia Keys

Single by Alicia Keys

from the album As I Am
- Released: September 10, 2007
- Studio: Glenwood Place (Burbank); Oven (Glen Cove)
- Genre: R&B
- Length: 4:13
- Label: J
- Songwriters: Alicia Keys; Kerry Brothers Jr.; George M. Harry
- Producers: Alicia Keys; Kerry "Krucial" Brothers

Alicia Keys singles chronology
"Ghetto Story" (2006)	"No One" (2007)	"Like You'll Never See Me Again" (2007)

Music video
- "No One" on YouTube

"No One" is a song recorded by American singer-songwriter Alicia Keys for her third studio album As I Am (2007). It was written and produced by Keys and Kerry Brothers Jr., with additional writing by DJ Dirty Harry. The song was released as the lead single from As I Am on September 10, 2007, by J Records.

A commercial success, "No One" topped the US Billboard Hot 100 for five consecutive weeks and also reached number one in Croatia, Hungary and Switzerland, while charting within the top ten in 18 additional countries. It was the third most successful song of 2008 in Brazil and the United States, and was the most listened song on US radio, with 3.08 billion listeners. It was also the sixth most successful song of the 2000s decade in the US.

"No One" is certified diamond by the Recording Industry Association of America (RIAA), and has sold 5.6 million copies worldwide. Critically acclaimed, it won Best Female R&B Vocal Performance and Best R&B Song at the 50th Annual Grammy Awards (2008).

== Background and release ==
"No One"

"No One" was written and produced by Alicia Keys, Kerry Brothers Jr., and George M. Harry. Keys told MTV News Canada that the song, "is really talking about the way that in relationships, the way that so many things are around you all the time to try to distract you. And even though people may talk and say whatever they may want to say, but then no one can get in the way of this." Keys said that it was a song that "just wrote itself". It was one of the last songs written for the album.

The song was first heard in August 2007 after Keys included a clip of the song in a newsletter on her official website and fan club. It was released officially on September 10, 2007, and its radio premiere was on Atlanta's WVEE on August 29. Keys performed a medley of "No One" with George Michael's "Freedom! '90" at the 2007 MTV Video Music Awards on September 9. Remixes of the song featuring Lil' Kim, Damian Marley, Junior Reid, Beenie Man, Barbee, and Kanye West exist. The official remix has a different but similar beat from the original version and features rapper Cassidy; it was produced by Swizz Beatz.

== Critical reception ==
"No One" received critical acclaim upon release. Popjustice viewed the song as "one of [Keys'] best singles to date and possibly one of the eight best ballads of 2007". Chuck Taylor of Billboard wrote that the song "shows the soulful chanteuse acting her age, in the best possible way" and that Keys "hold[s] back on the mastery of vocal craft to let cool, crisp production lead", adding that it "heralds her youth, while maintaining Keys' lockdown on penetrating hooks and soul-sopped production with a buoyancy that makes it a blast to sing along with." Anthony Venutolo of The Star-Ledger felt that on "No One", Keys "attempts to offer uplift through cliches".

Alex Fletcher of Digital Spy gave the song four stars out of five and called it "simplistic yet beautiful, fluttering, piano-tinkling ballad", the lyrics of which "expose Keys' vulnerability and current loved-up status". David Mead of Paste commented that the song "showcases a new depth and width to the tone of her voice, which seems to get closer to that of Aretha Franklin with each album." Nekesa Mumbi Moody of The Washington Post cited "No One" as one of the "gems" of the album and stated it "recalls a Bob Marley groove".

== Rankings ==
"No One" was ranked at number three on Entertainment Weekly's recap of "The 10 Best Songs of 2007", while it was voted number 23 on The Village Voice's 2007 Pazz & Jop critics' poll (tied with Modest Mouse's "Dashboard", R. Kelly's "I'm a Flirt" (Remix) featuring T.I. and T-Pain, and Avril Lavigne's "Girlfriend"). Popjustice placed it at number 47 on their list of "The Greatest Singles of 2007". In November 2012, Complex placed it at number one on their list of "The 25 Best Alicia Keys Songs", commenting that the "production was supreme, her vocals were at their strongest, and beyond technical merit".

In November 2012, The Grio ranked it at number four on their list of "Alicia Keys' 15 Greatest Songs". BET included the song at number two on its list of "The 25 Best Alicia Keys Songs", because "Alicia's soaring, power-packed alto contrast[s] beautifully with the soft piano cascades to create an undeniable anthem". PopCrush placed it at number two on its list of "Top 10 Alicia Keys Songs". In August 2025, the song was ranked at number 41 on Billboard's list of Top R&B/Rap Songs of the 21st Century.

== Accolades ==
A the 50th Annual Grammy Awards the Keys won both her two nominations with the song for Best Female R&B Vocal Performance and Best R&B Song, achieving a total of eleven Grammies in her career. The song also won the People's Choice Awards for Favorite R&B Song and two ASCAP Awards for her songwriting credits.

The relative music video was nominated at the MTV Video Music Awards Japan and at the MuchMusic Video Awards.

== Commercial performance ==
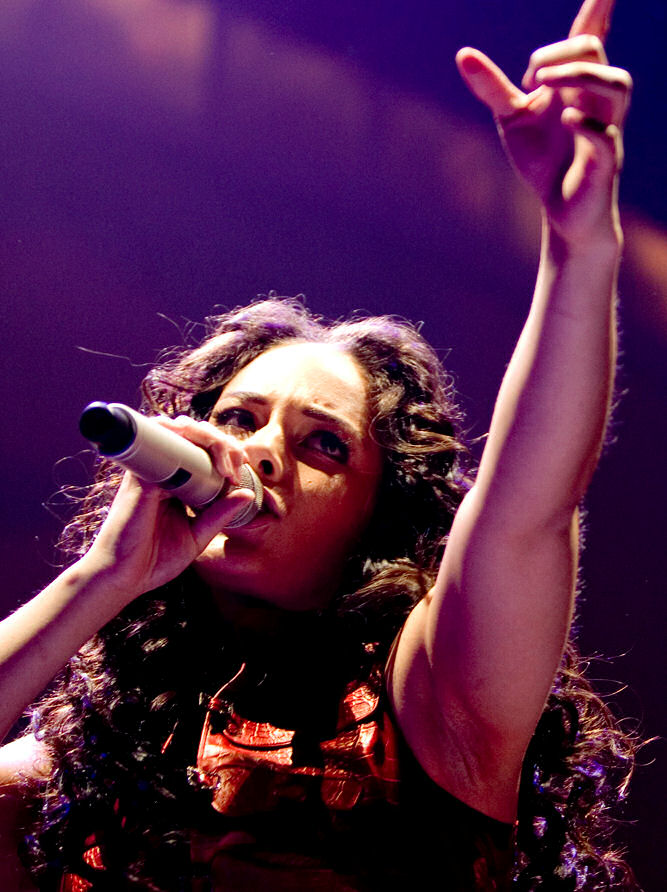
Keys during a concert in Portugal, where "No One" reached number two

With only one full day of airplay, "No One" debuted at number 65 on the US Billboard Hot R&B/Hip-Hop Songs chart on the issue dated September 8, 2007. Seven weeks later, it reached the top position for 10 weeks—becoming Keys' fifth number-one single on the chart—before being knocked out by her own song "Like You'll Never See Me Again" during the first charting week of 2008. The song initially debuted at number 15 on the Bubbling Under Hot 100 Singles for the week of September 15, 2007, and managed to jump to the Billboard Hot 100 at number 71 the following week without the benefit of download sales. The following week, it rose to number 15 because of digital downloads, and reached the top spot the charting week of December 1, 2007, staying atop for five weeks. In the week between October 22–25, 2007, "No One" gained 14.3% in radio airplay and audience impressions which marks the single at number one. It is Keys' first solo single to reach number one on the Hot 100 since her debut single "Fallin'" (2001) and her third single to top the chart. It is also the overall biggest hit that peaked in 2007.

Additionally, "No One" went on to top several other Billboard charts, including the Pop 100 chart, the Pop 100 Airplay chart, the Mainstream Top 40, and the Rhythmic Airplay chart. By June 2014, the song had sold four million copies in the United States. "No One" was the most listened-to song on US radio of 2008, with 3.08 billion listeners. Billboard ranked it at number 48 on the list of "The All-Time Top 100 Songs" in 2013 and at number 14 on the list of the "Top Billboard Hot 100 R&B/Hip-Hop Songs" in 2008. In 2009, the song was placed at number six on the Billboard Hot 100 decade-end chart.

The single was commercially successful in Europe as well, peaking at number two on the European Hot 100 Singles as well as reaching the top position in Hungary and Switzerland, and peaked within the top ten of the charts in Austria, Belgium, Denmark, France, Germany, Italy, the Netherlands, Norway, the Republic of Ireland, Slovakia, Spain, Sweden, and the United Kingdom. In the latter country, "No One" has re-entered the UK Singles Chart twice since its official release, both times due to exposure on British television (firstly after being performed by an auditionee on Britain's Got Talent and secondly after Keys herself performed it within a medley on The X Factor). In May 2009, it re-entered at number 54 on the UK Singles Chart, and in December 2009 it re-entered at number 51 on the chart.

It also charted highly in Oceania, peaking within the top ten of the charts in Australia and New Zealand. According to the International Federation of the Phonographic Industry (IFPI), "No One" has sold 5.6 million copies.

== Music video ==
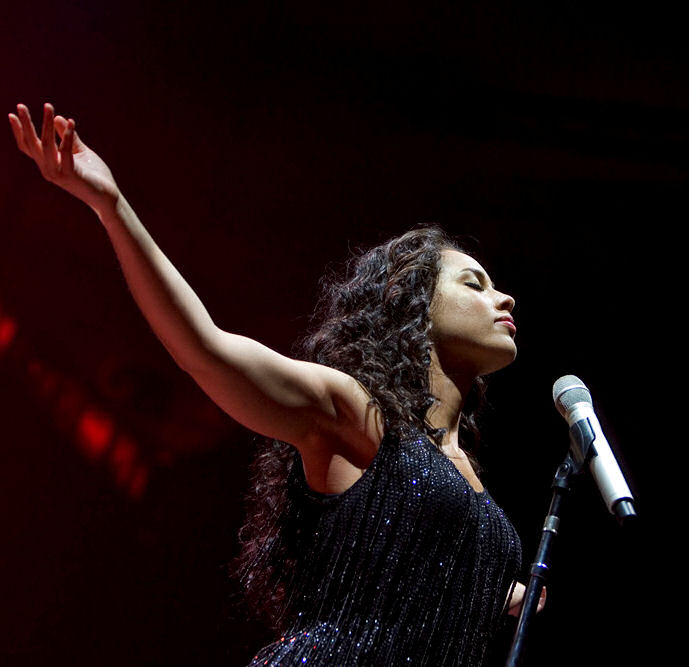
In several scenes of the video, Keys sings with a microphone and an electronic keyboard

The music video for "No One", directed by Justin Francis in April 2007, and premiered on BET on September 24, 2007. It debuted on 106 and Park at number 10 the following day, and eventually peaked at number one. It premiered on Yahoo! Music on September 25 at number five and peaked at number one, and it premiered on Total Request Live on October 4 and peaked at number one. It debuted on VH1's VSpot Top 20 Countdown at number three, peaking at number one. The video was ranked at number 22 on VH1's "Top 40 Videos of 2007" and at number two on BET's "Notarized: Top 100 Videos of 2007".

The video consists of four settings: the first one shows Keys lying on a chair in an empty room; the second one is a room filled with musical instruments in which Keys sings accompanied by a Roland Jupiter-8 keyboard; in the third one Keys is initially alone, playing the piano on a rainy street, and she later finds herself surrounded with dozens of people; in the fourth and final one Keys is in a blue-lit nightclub. The video ends with a gear divided into four fractions, each one featuring a previously shown setting, with Keys lying on the chair in the same room shown at the beginning of the video.

== Track listings ==
- European CD single
1. "No One" (Album Version) – 4:13
2. "No One" (Curtis Lynch Reggae Mix) – 3:59
- European limited-edition CD single
1. "No One" (Album Version) – 4:13
2. "No One" (Salaam Remi Mix) (featuring Junior Reid) – 4:50
- European / Australian CD maxi single
1. "No One" (Album Version) – 4:13
2. "No One" (Curtis Lynch Reggae Mix) – 3:59
3. "Superwoman" (Live) – 4:02
4. "No One" (Video)
- US 12-inch single

A1. "No One" (Radio Mix) – 4:07
A2. "No One" (Instrumental) – 4:07
B1. "No One" (Curtis Lynch Reggae Remix) – 3:59
B2. "No One" (Curtis Lynch Reggae Remix – Instrumental) – 4:03

- Digital EP
1. "No One" – 4:14
2. "No One" (Salaam Remi Mix) (featuring Junior Reid) – 4:51
3. "No One" (Curtis Lynch Reggae Remix) – 3:56
4. "Superwoman" (Live) – 4:29
5. "No One" (Music Video)

== Credits and personnel ==
Credits adapted from the liner notes of As I Am.

- Alicia Keys – production, vocals, piano, Jupiter synth, vocoder, Mellotron, programmed strings
- Kerry "Krucial" Brothers – production, programmed drums
- Dirty Harry – co-production
- Steve Mostyn – acoustic guitar, bass guitar
- Ann Mincieli – engineering, recording
- Brendan Dekora – engineering assistance
- Zach Hancock – engineering assistance
- Stuart White – engineering assistance
- Manny Marroquin – mixing
- Jared Robbins – mix assistance
- Dave Kutch – mastering

== Charts ==
=== Weekly charts ===
Weekly chart performance
Chart (2007–2008)	Peak position
Australia (ARIA)	3
Australian Urban (ARIA)	2
Austria (Ö3 Austria Top 40)	3
Belgium (Ultratop 50 Flanders)	4
Belgium (Ultratop 50 Wallonia)	5
Canada Hot 100 (Billboard)	2
Canada AC (Billboard)	2
Canada CHR/Top 40 (Billboard)	1
Canada Hot AC (Billboard)	1
Croatia (HRT)	1
Czech Republic Airplay (ČNS IFPI)	13
Denmark (Tracklisten)	7
European Hot 100 Singles (Billboard)	2
Finland (Suomen virallinen lista)	17
France (SNEP)	5
Germany (GfK)	3
Hungary (Rádiós Top 40)	1
Ireland (IRMA)	8
Italy (FIMI)	2
Japan (Japan Hot 100)	29
Mexico (Top 20 – Inglés)	8
Netherlands (Dutch Top 40)	3
Netherlands (Single Top 100)	4
New Zealand (Recorded Music NZ)	2
Norway (VG-lista)	8
Poland (Nielsen Music Control)	5
Portugal Digital Songs (Billboard)	2
Romania (Romanian Top 100)	12
Russia Airplay (TopHit)	62
Scottish Singles Sales (Official Charts)	6
Slovakia Airplay (ČNS IFPI)	3
Spain (PROMUSICAE)	8
Sweden (Sverigetopplistan)	5
Switzerland (Schweizer Hitparade)	1
UK Singles (Official Charts)	6
UK Hip Hop/R&B (Official Charts)	3
US Billboard Hot 100	1
US Adult Contemporary (Billboard)	9
US Adult Pop Airplay (Billboard)	9
US Hot Latin Songs (Billboard)	22
US Hot R&B/Hip-Hop Songs (Billboard)	1
US Pop Airplay (Billboard)	1
US Pop 100 (Billboard)	1
US Rhythmic Airplay (Billboard)	1
US Smooth Jazz Airplay (Billboard)	17

Chart (2012)	Peak position
South Korea International (Gaon)	74

=== Year-end charts ===
Annual chart rankings
Chart (2007)	Position
Australia (ARIA)	48
Australian Urban (ARIA)	11
France (SNEP)	67
French Airplay (SNEP)	99
Germany (Media Control GfK)	73
Italy (FIMI)	22
Netherlands (Dutch Top 40)	61
Netherlands (Single Top 100)	84
New Zealand (RIANZ)	19
Sweden (Sverigetopplistan)	55
Switzerland (Schweizer Hitparade)	23
UK Singles (OCC)	49
US Billboard Hot 100	76
US Hot R&B/Hip-Hop Songs (Billboard)	30

Chart (2008)	Position
Australia (ARIA)	47
Australian Urban (ARIA)	13
Austria (Ö3 Austria Top 40)	23
Belgium (Ultratop 50 Flanders)	22
Belgium (Ultratop 50 Wallonia)	17
Brazil (Crowley Broadcast Analysis)	3
Canadian Hot 100 (Billboard)	7
Canada AC (Billboard)	6
Canada CHR/Top 40 (Billboard)	10
Canada Hot AC (Billboard)	15
Europe (European Hot 100 Singles)	7
France (SNEP)	48
Germany (Media Control GfK)	24
Hungary (Rádiós Top 40)	6
Japan (Japan Hot 100)	40
Netherlands (Dutch Top 40)	36
Netherlands (Single Top 100)	47
Russia Airplay (TopHit)	158
Spain (PROMUSICAE)	25
Sweden (Sverigetopplistan)	66
Switzerland (Schweizer Hitparade)	24
UK Singles (OCC)	90
US Billboard Hot 100	3
US Adult Contemporary (Billboard)	17
US Adult Top 40 (Billboard)	28
US Hot R&B/Hip-Hop Songs (Billboard)	8
US Mainstream Top 40 (Billboard)	8
US Pop 100 (Billboard)	15
US Rhythmic Airplay (Billboard)	16
Worldwide (IFPI)	8

=== Decade-end charts ===
Decade-end chart performance
Chart (2000–2009)	Position
Germany (Official German Charts)	47
Netherlands (Dutch Top 40)	39
US Billboard Hot 100	6
US Hot R&B/Hip-Hop Songs (Billboard)	11
US Mainstream Top 40 (Billboard)	47

=== All-time charts ===
All-time chart performance
Chart	Position
Dutch Love Songs (Dutch Top 40)	24

Chart (1958–2018)	Position
US Billboard Hot 100	53

Chart (1958–2008)	Position
US Hot R&B/Hip-Hop Songs (Billboard)	14

== Certifications and sales ==
Certifications and sales
Region	Certification	Certified units/sales
Australia (ARIA)	6× Platinum	420,000^{‡}
Belgium (BRMA)	Gold	25,000^{*}
Canada (Music Canada)	2× Platinum	80,000^{*}
Canada (Music Canada) Ringtone	2× Platinum	80,000^{*}
Denmark (IFPI Danmark)	Platinum	15,000^{^}
France (SNEP)	Gold	66,666^{‡}
Germany (BVMI)	Gold	150,000^{^}
Italy (FIMI)	Platinum	157,109 (Note: In Italy, the certification for "No One" is based only on 2010–2021 digital sales and streams; 70,000 units are required for a platinum certification. Prior to 2010, the single sold 87,109 units in the country.)
Japan (RIAJ) Digital	Gold	100,000^{*}
Japan (RIAJ) Full-length ringtone	Gold	100,000^{*}
Mexico (AMPROFON)	2× Platinum	120,000^{‡}
New Zealand (RMNZ)	5× Platinum	150,000^{‡}
Portugal (AFP)	Platinum	20,000^{‡}
Spain (Promusicae)	2× Platinum	40,000^{*}
Spain (Promusicae) reissue	Platinum	60,000^{‡}
Sweden (GLF)	Platinum	20,000^{^}
United Kingdom (BPI)	3× Platinum	1,800,000^{‡}
United States (RIAA)	Diamond	10,000,000^{‡}
United States (RIAA) Mastertone	2× Platinum	2,000,000^{*}
^{*} Sales figures based on certification alone.^{^} Shipments figures based on certification alone.^{‡} Sales+streaming figures based on certification alone.

== Release history ==
Release dates and formats
Region	Date	Format(s)	Label(s)	Ref.
United States	September 10, 2007	Digital download	J	
United States	October 9, 2007	Rhythmic contemporary radio	J	
United States	October 16, 2007	Contemporary hit radio	J	
United States	October 23, 2007	12-inch vinyl; digital download (EP)	J	
Germany	October 26, 2007	Maxi CD	Sony BMG	
Australia	November 3, 2007	Maxi CD	Sony BMG	
United Kingdom	November 5, 2007	Digital download	RCA	
United Kingdom	November 12, 2007	Maxi CD	RCA	
France	December 3, 2007	CD	Sony BMG	
Germany	February 8, 2008	CD	Sony BMG	

== See also ==
- List of best-selling singles in the United States
- List of Billboard Hot 100 number-one singles of 2007
- List of Billboard Mainstream Top 40 number-one songs of 2008
- List of Hot 100 Airplay number-one singles of 2007 (U.S.)
- List of Hot 100 Airplay number-one singles of 2008 (U.S.)
- List of number-one digital singles of 2007 (Italy)
- List of number-one digital songs of 2007 (U.S.)
- List of number-one hits of 2007 (Switzerland)
- List of number-one R&B singles of 2007 (U.S.)
