= Like You'll Never See Me Again =

2008 single by Alicia Keys

Single by Alicia Keys

from the album As I Am
- Released: January 22, 2008
- Studio: Oven (Glen Gove); Conway (Los Angeles)
- Genre: Soul; R&B
- Length: 5:15: 4:12 (radio edit)
- Label: J
- Songwriters: Alicia Keys; Kerry Brothers Jr.
- Producers: Alicia Keys; Kerry "Krucial" Brothers

Alicia Keys singles chronology
"No One" (2007)	"Like You'll Never See Me Again" (2008)	"Teenage Love Affair" (2008)

Music video
- "Like You'll Never See Me Again" on YouTube

"Like You'll Never See Me Again" is a song recorded by American singer-songwriter Alicia Keys for her third studio album As I Am (2007). Written and produced by Keys and Kerry Brothers Jr., it was first heard on October 25, 2007, on Atlanta's V103 WVEE radio station. Subsequently, it was released as the second single from As I Am on January 22, 2008, by J Records.

"Like You'll Never See Me Again" peaked at number 12 on the US Billboard Hot 100 and became Keys' second consecutive R&B chart-topper, remaining atop the Hot R&B/Hip-Hop Songs chart for seven weeks and dislodging Keys' previous single "No One" from the top position. In 2008, the song won two NAACP Image Awards, for Outstanding Music Video and Outstanding Song, and an ASCAP Rhythm & Soul Music Award for Top R&B/Hip-Hop Song.

== Composition ==
"Like You'll Never See Me Again" was written and produced by Keys and Kerry Brothers Jr. Keys explained to MTV News that the song is "about living every moment as if it's your last. Because if it's our last time to say, 'I love you,' then let it be that we didn't forget that."

== Critical reception ==
"Like You'll Never See Me Again"
Alicia Keys's "Like You'll Never See Me Again" from As I Am

The song received critical acclaim. Nate Chinem from New York Times wrote that the song is "a distant cousin to Prince’s 'Purple Rain'." J. Freedom du Lac from Washington Post agreed, writing that "the sexy, Prince-ly track is by far the album's best track. Rodney Dugue from Spin wrote that the song is a "dreamy lullaby, where she ponders whether she'll be appreciated after a lover stops calling her name." Edna Gundersen from USA Today praised the track, referring to it as an "instant and enchanting classic, where Keys simply dazzles, demonstrating her lock on the future regardless of the industry's fate." Stephanie Merrit from The Observer called it a "sweet, caramel-smooth track."

Nick Levine wrote for Digital Spy a very positive review, writing that it is "a smoochy, seductive soul ballad, built around a delicate, Oriental-sounding piano riff, it gives Keys plenty of chance to show off her breathy, Mariah-esque upper register. Best of all, like all Keys' most impressive moments, its melody has a timeless quality that allows it to transcend its modish R&B production." In August 2025, the song was ranked at number 32 on Billboard's list of Top R&B/Rap Songs of the 21st Century.

== Commercial performance ==
"Like You'll Never See Me Again" debuted at number 37 on the Billboard Hot R&B/Hip-Hop Songs as the Hot Shot debut of the week, jumping to number 22 in its second week, number 15 in its third week, and to then number nine in its fourth. After climbing to number three in its fifth week, the song reached number two in its sixth week, and then rose to number one in its ninth week, beating off Keys' own song "No One"; this made Keys the second artist since the R&B chart began using Nielsen SoundScan data in 1992 to succeed herself at number one, as "Like You'll Never See Me Again" jumped from number two to number one and traded places with "No One", which had topped the chart for 10 weeks. Rapper Nelly accomplished this feat in 2002 with "Hot in Herre" and "Dilemma". The song spent seven weeks atop the chart, after which it remained at number two for six weeks thereafter. As of the charting week of September 13, 2008, "Like You'll Never See Me Again" has remained on the chart for 45 consecutive weeks, all of them inside the top 50. Additionally, the song topped the Hot R&B/Hip-Hop Songs year-end chart of 2008. On the Billboard Hot 100, it debuted at number 93, jumped to number 45 in its second week, and subsequently peaked at number 12.

"Like You'll Never See Me Again" was released on February 25, 2008, in the United Kingdom, peaking at number 53 on the UK Singles Chart. In Australia, it debuted and peaked at number 77 on the ARIA Singles Chart, number 44 on the Physical Singles Chart, and number 19 on the Urban Singles Chart the week of April 14, 2008.

== Music video ==
The music video for "Like You'll Never See Me Again", directed by Diane Martel, features cameos by Common (with whom Keys had previously worked with in the 2007 motion picture Smokin' Aces) as Keys' love interest who is critically injured in a motorcycle accident and Keys' mother Terri Augello as a hospital medic. It tells the story backwards, and the viewer learns that the couple had been arguing. The video premiered on November 13, 2007, on MTV's Total Request Live and BET's 106 & Park. It debuted at number two on VH1's VSpot Top 20 Countdown on February 23, 2008. Keys described the video as "heart-wrenching. If your heart doesn't feel me, then you are dead!".

== Track listings ==
- European / Australian CD single
1. "Like You'll Never See Me Again" (Album Version) – 5:15
2. "Like You'll Never See Me Again" (Seiji Club Mix) – 6:56
- European promotional CD Maxi-single
1. "Like You'll Never See Me Again" (Radio Edit) – 4:07
2. "Like You'll Never See Me Again" (Seiji Remix) – 3:43
3. "Like You'll Never See Me Again" (Jony Rockstar Remix) – 3:50
4. "Like You'll Never See Me Again" (Video)
- US / European promotional CD single
1. "Like You'll Never See Me Again" (Radio Edit) – 4:07
2. "Like You'll Never See Me Again" (Instrumental) – 5:14
3. "Like You'll Never See Me Again" (Call Out Hook) – 0:10
- Japanese promotional CD single
1. "Like You'll Never See Me Again" (Main)
2. "Like You'll Never See Me Again" (Jony Rockstar Remix)
3. "Like You'll Never See Me Again" (Seiji Remix)
4. "No One" (Main)
- Digital download
1. "Like You'll Never See Me Again" (Remix) (featuring Ludacris) – 3:57

== Credits and personnel ==
Production

- Alicia Keys – producer, string programming
- Kerry "Krucial" Brothers – co-producer, drum programming
- Ann Mincieli – engineer
- Zach Hancock – assistant engineer
- Seth Waldmann – assistant engineer
- Manny Marroquin – mixing
- Jared Robbins – mix assistant

Musicians

- Alicia Keys – vocals, piano, lead Moog, virtual synthesizers
- Steve Mostyn – bass guitar
- John "Jubu" Smith – lead guitar, rhythm guitar

== Charts ==
=== Weekly charts ===
Chart (2007–2008)	Peak position
Australia (ARIA)	77
Australia Urban (ARIA)	19
Belgium (Ultratip Bubbling Under Flanders)	17
Belgium (Ultratip Bubbling Under Wallonia)	6
Canada CHR/Top 40 (Billboard)	46
Germany (GfK)	63
Ireland (IRMA)	48
Japan Hot 100 (Billboard Japan)	53
Netherlands (Dutch Top 40)	20
Netherlands (Single Top 100)	84
Romania (Romanian Top 100)	97
Slovakia Airplay (ČNS IFPI)	100
Sweden (Sverigetopplistan)	57
UK Singles (Official Charts)	53
UK Hip Hop/R&B (Official Charts)	3
US Billboard Hot 100	12
US Hot R&B/Hip-Hop Songs (Billboard)	1
US Pop Airplay (Billboard)	25
US Pop 100 (Billboard)	32
US Rhythmic Airplay (Billboard)	4
US Smooth Jazz Airplay (Billboard)	19

=== Year-end charts ===
Chart (2008)	Position
US Billboard Hot 100	47
US Hot R&B/Hip-Hop Songs (Billboard)	1
US Rhythmic Airplay (Billboard)	32

=== Decade-end charts ===
Chart (2000–2009)	Position
US Hot R&B/Hip-Hop Songs (Billboard)	10

== Certifications ==
Region	Certification	Certified units/sales
United States (RIAA)	Platinum	1,000,000^{‡}
^{‡} Sales+streaming figures based on certification alone.

== Release history ==
Release dates and formats
Region	Date	Format(s)	Version(s)	Label(s)	Ref.
United States	January 22, 2008	Contemporary hit radio	Original	J	
United Kingdom	February 25, 2008	CD; digital download	Original; Seiji Club Mix	RCA	
United Kingdom	February 25, 2008	Digital download	Jony Rockstar Remix	RCA	
United States	March 11, 2008	Digital download	Remix featuring Ludacris	J	
Australia	April 5, 2008	CD	Original; Seiji Club Mix	Sony BMG	
Germany	May 9, 2008	CD; digital download; maxi CD	Original; Seiji Club Mix	Sony BMG	

== See also ==
- List of number-one R&B/hip-hop songs of 2008 (U.S.)
