= Maxwell discography =

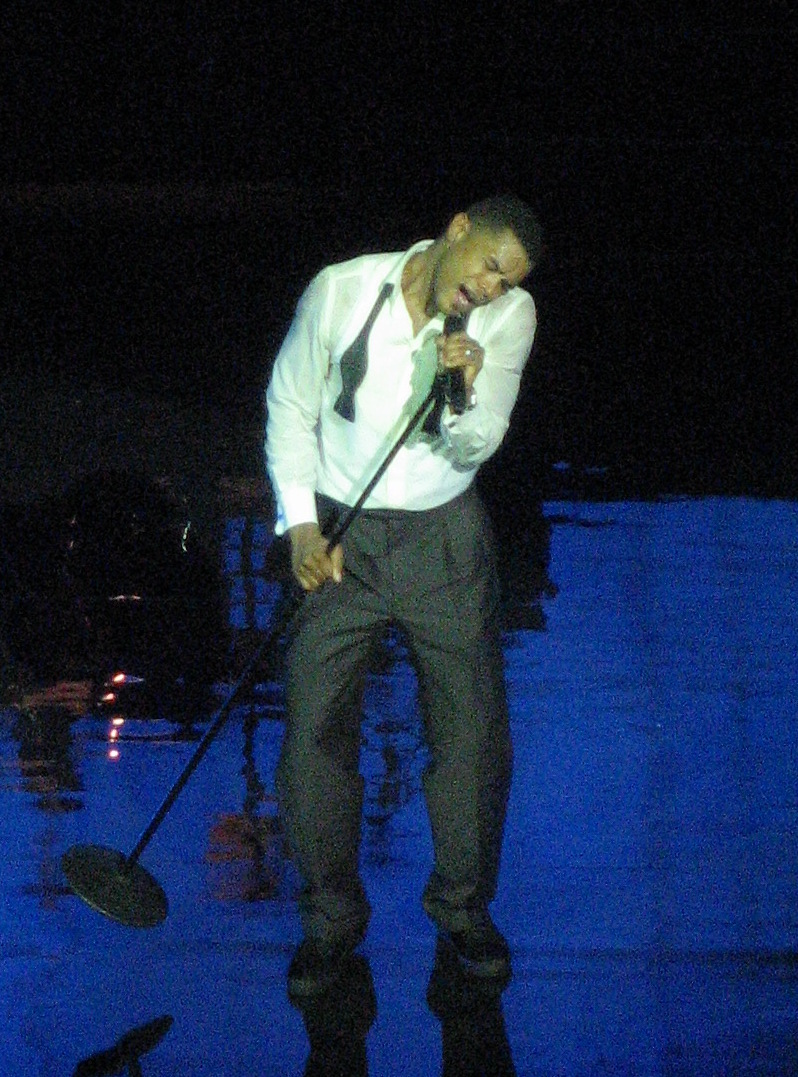
- Maxwell performing in 2007
- Studio albums: 5
- Extended plays: 1
- Singles: 25

American R&B singer Maxwell has released five studio albums, one extended play and twenty five singles.

== Albums ==
=== Studio albums ===
Title	Album details	Chart positions										Certifications
Title	Album details	US	US R&B/HH	AUS	CAN	FRA	NL	NZ	SWE	SWI	UK	Certifications
Maxwell's Urban Hang Suite	Released: April 2, 1996; Label: Columbia; Formats: CD, LP, cassette, digital download	37	8	100	—	33	52	33	46	—	39	RIAA: 2× Platinum; BPI: Gold
Embrya	Released: June 23, 1998; Label: Columbia; Formats: CD, LP, cassette, digital download	3	2	20	42	23	29	39	10	38	11	RIAA: Platinum
Now	Released: August 14, 2001; Label: Columbia; Formats: CD, LP, cassette, digital download	1	1	32	21	32	27	—	12	64	46	RIAA: Platinum
BLACKsummers'night	Released: July 7, 2009; Label: Columbia; Formats: CD, LP, digital download	1	1	—	25	147	31	—	—	—	66	RIAA: Platinum
blackSUMMERS'night	Released: July 1, 2016; Label: Columbia; Formats: CD, LP, digital download	3	1	49	14	—	33	— (Note: blackSUMMERS'night did not enter the NZ Top 40 Albums Chart, but peaked at number 5 on the NZ Heatseeker Albums Chart.)	—	64	72	

== Extended plays ==
Year	Title	Chart positions					Certifications
Year	Title	US	US R&B/HH	FRA	NL	UK	Certifications
1997	MTV Unplugged: Released: July 15, 1997; Label: Columbia	53	15	26	58	45	RIAA: Gold

== Singles ==
Year	Title	Chart positions					Certifications	Album
Year	Title	US	US R&B/Hip-Hop	US Urban AC	AUS	UK	Certifications	Album
1996	"Til the Cops Come Knockin'"	—	79	—	—	63		Maxwell's Urban Hang Suite
1996	"Ascension (Don't Ever Wonder)"	36	8	2	—	28	RIAA: Platinum; BPI: Silver	Maxwell's Urban Hang Suite
1996	"Sumthin' Sumthin'"	—	23	10	—	27	RIAA: Gold	Maxwell's Urban Hang Suite
1997	"Suitelady (The Proposal Jam)"	—	64	—	—	—		Maxwell's Urban Hang Suite
1997	"Whenever, Wherever, Whatever"	—	54	—	—	—		MTV Unplugged
1997	"This Woman's Work" (Live)	—	—	—	—	—		MTV Unplugged
1998	"Luxury: Cococure"	—	16	2	—	—		Embrya
1998	"Matrimony: Maybe You"	—	79	—	—	—		Embrya
1999	"Fortunate"	4	1	1	52	—	RIAA: Gold	Life OST
1999	"Let's Not Play the Game"	—	55	—	—	—		The Best Man OST
2000	"Gravity: Pushing to Pull (Fellowship Remixes)"	—	—	—	—	—		Embrya
2001	"Get to Know Ya"	—	25	2	—	—		Now
2001	"Lifetime"	22	5	1	—	—		Now
2002	"This Woman's Work"	58	16	2	—	41		Now
2009	"Pretty Wings"	33	1	1	—	—	RIAA: Gold	BLACKsummers'night
2009	"Bad Habits"	71	4	1	—	—		BLACKsummers'night
2009	"Cold"	—	62	—	—	—		BLACKsummers'night
2009	"Fistful of Tears"	94	11	1	—	—		BLACKsummers'night
2016	"Lake by the Ocean"	—	12	1	—	—		blackSUMMERS'night
2016	"All The Ways Love Can Feel"	—	—	—	—	—		blackSUMMERS'night
2016	"1990x"	—	28	3	—	—		blackSUMMERS'night
2017	"Gods"	—	46	11	—	—		blackSUMMERS'night
2018	"We Never Saw It Coming"	—	—	—	—	—		Non-album single
2018	"Shame"	—	35	8	—	—		blacksummers'NIGHT
2021	"OFF"	—	20	1	—	—		blacksummers'NIGHT
2024	"Simply Beautiful"	—	10	1	—	—		Non-album single

== Album appearances ==
Year	Song	Album
1996	"Softly Softly" (Sweetback featuring Maxwell)	Sweetback
2004	"No One Else in the Room" (Nas featuring Maxwell)	Street's Disciple
2009	"Smile" (The Alchemist featuring Maxwell & Twista)	Chemical Warfare
2012	"Fire We Make" (Alicia Keys featuring Maxwell)	Girl on Fire

=== Soundtrack appearances ===
- 1997: Love Jones ("Sumthin' Sumthin': Mellosmoothe (Cut)")
- 1999: Life ("Fortunate")
- 1999: The Best Man ("Let's Not Play the Game", "As My Girl")
- 2000: Love & Basketball ("This Woman's Work")
- 2006: Little Man ("Purple Haze")
- 2007: Stomp the Yard ("This Woman's Work")

=== Other works ===
- 1996: Red Hot + Rio ("Seguranca")
- 2004: Cottonbelly NYC Sessions ("Luxury")

== Notes ==
Maxwell
