= BLACKsummers'night Tour =

2009 concert tour by Maxwell

- Tour by Maxwell
- Associated album: BLACKsummers'night
- Start date: June 17, 2009
- End date: December 2, 2009
- Legs: 3
- No. of shows: 50 in North America; 11 in Europe

Maxwell concert chronology
- Maxwell 08 Tour (2008); BLACKsummers'night Tour (2009); Maxwell & Jill Scott: The Tour (2010)

BLACKsummers'night Tour is a tour by American R&B singer Maxwell. The tour was in support of his platinum hit album BLACKsummers'night. The trek kicked off on June 17, 2009, in Grand Rapids, Michigan throughout North America. The tour continued during the fall with a second U.S. run in September, and additional dates added throughout Europe, his first tour there in 11 years.

== Background ==
Before the release of Maxwell's anticipated album BLACKsummers'night released on July 7, 2009 the singer embarked on a summer tour that kicked off in North America on June 17, that ended on August 2, in New York. Following the summer U.S. leg, he added dates for the fall outing starting Sept 2, at the House of Blues in Boston, Massachusetts that included supporting acts R&B singer Chrisette Michele and hiphop artist Common joining him on Sept. 25 in Toronto. Maxwell kicked off a European tour on oct 28, in Birmingham, UK with a final run ending on November 13, at London' s o2 Academy Brixton.

== Opening Acts ==
- Laura Izibor (USA—Leg 1)
- Chrisette Michele (USA—Leg 2)
- Common (USA—Leg 2)

== Set list ==
1. "Phoenix Rise"
2. "Dance wit Me"
3. "Sumthin' Sumthin'"
4. "Get to Know Ya"^{1}
5. "Lifetime"
6. "Bad Habits"
7. "Lovin' You"
8. "Simply Beautiful" (Al Green song)
9. "Fortunate"
10. "Everwanting: To Want You to Want"^{1}
11. "Gravity: Pushing to Pull"^{2}
12. "Help Somebody"
13. "Fistful of Tears"
14. "Cold"
15. "No One"
16. "Playing Possum"^{2}
17. "This Woman's Work"
18. "Stop the World"
19. ". . . Til the Cops Come Knockin'"
20. "Pretty Wings"
21. "Ascension (Don't Ever Wonder)"
22. "Whenever, Wherever, Whatever"

^{1} performed only on select dates in the US and Europe
^{2} performed on dates in the USA

== Band ==
- Keyboards/Piano: Robert Glasper
- Guitar: Hod David, Derrick Hodge
- Bass: Sean Michael Ray
- Percussions: Timbali Cornwell
- Drums: Chris Dave, Spanky Mc Curdy
- Trombone: Saunders Sermon
- Saxophone: Kenneth Wahlum III
- Organ: Shedrick Mitchell
- Trumpet: Keyon Harrold
- Background vocals: Latina Webb, Keyon Harrold, Saunders Sermon, Kenneth Wahlum III

== Tour dates ==
Date	City	Country	Venue
North America
June 17, 2009	Grand Rapids	United States	DeVos Performance Hall
June 19, 2009	Hammond	United States	The Venue
June 20, 2009	Milwaukee	United States	Riverside Theater
June 23, 2009	Seattle	United States	Paramount Theater
June 24, 2009	Vancouver	Canada	Chan Centre for the Performing Arts
June 26, 2009	Las Vegas	United States	Pearl Concert Theater
June 29, 2009	Phoenix	United States	Dodge Theatre
July 1, 2009	Austin	United States	Bass Concert Hall
July 2, 2009	San Antonio	United States	Majestic Theater
July 4, 2009	New Orleans	United States	Louisiana Superdome
July 8, 2009	New York City	United States	P.C. Richard & Son Theater
July 12, 2009	Nashville	United States	Ryman Auditorium
July 13, 2009	Louisville	United States	The Louisville Palace
July 15, 2009	Columbus	United States	Palace Theatre
July 16, 2009	Cleveland	United States	Allen Theatre
July 18, 2009	Pittsburgh	United States	Heinz Hall
July 19, 2009	Buffalo	United States	Shea's Performing Arts Center
July 21, 2009	Albany	United States	Palace Theater
July 22, 2009	Newark	United States	New Jersey Performing Arts Center
July 24, 2009	Atlantic City	United States	Borgata
July 25, 2009	Mashantucket	United States	MGM Grand at Foxwoods
July 27, 2009	Norfolk	United States	Chrysler Hall
July 28, 2009	Savannah	United States	Orpheum Theater
July 30, 2009	Tampa	United States	Ruth Eckerd Hall
July 31, 2009	Miami	United States	American Airlines Arena
August 2, 2009	Jacksonville	United States	Times-Union Center for the Performing Arts
August 3, 2009	North Charleston	United States	North Charleston Coliseum
August 5, 2009	Durham	United States	Durham Performing Arts Center
September 2, 2009	Boston	United States	House of Blues
September 4, 2009	Kissimmee	United States	Gaylord Palms Resort Center
September 25, 2009	Toronto	Canada	Air Canada Centre
September 26, 2009	Detroit	United States	Joe Louis Arena
September 28, 2009	New York City	United States	Madison Square Garden
September 30, 2009	Richmond	United States	Richmond Coliseum
October 2, 2009	Washington, D.C.	United States	Verizon Center
October 3, 2009	Philadelphia	United States	Wachovia Spectrum
October 5, 2009	Atlanta	United States	Philips Arena
October 6, 2009	Charlotte	United States	Time Warner Cable Arena
October 8, 2009	Chicago	United States	United Center
October 9, 2009	St. Louis	United States	Scottrade Center
October 10, 2009	North Little Rock	United States	Verizon Arena
October 12, 2009	Dallas	United States	American Airlines Center
October 13, 2009	Houston	United States	Toyota Center
October 16, 2009	Los Angeles	United States	Hollywood Bowl
October 17, 2009	Concord	United States	Sleep Train Pavilion
October 20, 2009	Memphis	United States	FedExForum
October 21, 2009	New Orleans	United States	Lakefront Arena
October 23, 2009	Baltimore	United States	1st Mariner Arena
Europe
October 28, 2009	Birmingham	United Kingdom	O2 Academy Birmingham
October 30, 2009	Manchester	United Kingdom	Manchester Academy
October 31, 2009	London	United Kingdom	Hammersmith Apollo
November 3, 2009	Paris	France	Casino de Paris
November 4, 2009	Amsterdam	Netherlands	Heineken Music Hall
November 6, 2009	Cologne	Germany	E-Werk
November 7, 2009	Zürich	Switzerland	Kaufleuten
November 9, 2009	Copenhagen	Denmark	Amager Bio
November 10, 2009	Stockholm	Sweden	Berns Salonger
November 12, 2009	Brussels	Belgium	Ancienne Belgique
November 13, 2009	London	United Kingdom	Brixton Academy
North America
December 2, 2009	Los Angeles	United States	Nokia Theatre
