= King and Queen of Hearts World Tour =

2016 concert tour by Maxwell and Mary J. Blige

- Tour by Maxwell and Mary J. Blige
- Location: Europe; United States; Canada
- Start date: October 13, 2016
- End date: December 14, 2016
- No. of shows: 36
Maxwell tour chronology
Annual Summer Jam (2016)	Kings and Queens of Hearts World Tour (2016)
Mary J. Blige tour chronology
The London Sessions Tour (2015)	Kings and Queens of Hearts World Tour (2016)	Strength of a Woman Tour (2017)

The King and Queen of Hearts Tour was a co-headlining tour by American singers Maxwell and Mary J. Blige. The tour began October 2016 in Europe then moved to North America. The North American leg of the tour grossed $13.1 million, averaged $545,000 per show, and ranked 90 on Pollstar's Top 200 North American Tours.

== Background ==
The tour was announced in July 2016 on Facebook. According to Blige, the tour has been in the works for a few years. The duo felt because of their similar audiences and sound, touring together was an obvious decision. The tour is described as a celebration of 90s R&B. In the planning stages, the trek was titled "Maxwell & Mary on Stage, however, Blige came up with the current title. Dates in Europe were released in July with dates in North America followed in September.

Describing the tour, Maxwell stated:

"It's going to be a very beautiful chess game on stage, and the queen has all the moves. I feel like we're going to be able to magnify each other and take people to where they need to be in an emotional way, especially in a time where we have so much political unrest. It's kind of wild out there".

== Opening act ==
- Ro James (North America)

== Setlist ==
The following setlists were performed on October 15, 2016 at the Jahrhunderthalle in Frankfurt, Germany. They do not represent all concerts for the duration of the tour.

Mary J. Blige
1. "Love Yourself"
2. "Just Fine"
3. "The One"
4. "You Bring Me Joy"
5. "Love Is All We Need"
6. "Real Love" / "Be Happy" / "Love No Limit"
7. "Enough Cryin"
8. "I Can Love You"
9. "Don't Mind"
10. "Share My World"
11. "Take Me As I Am"
12. "Good Woman Down"
13. "My Life"
14. "I'm Goin' Down"
15. "Thick of It"
16. "Not Gon' Cry"
17. "No More Drama"
18. "Family Affair"
Maxwell
1. "Dancewitme"
2. "Everwanting: To Want You to Want"
3. "Bad Habits"
4. "Love You"
5. "This Woman's Work"
6. "Fingers Crossed"
7. "Lifetime"
8. "Lake by the Ocean"
9. "...Til the Cops Come Knockin'"
10. "Lost"
11. "Sumthin' Sumthin'"
12. "Get to Know Ya"
13. "Fortunate"
14. "Ascension (Don't Ever Wonder)"
15. "Pretty Wings"

== Tour dates ==
List of concerts, showing date, city, country and venue
Date (2016)	City	Country	Venue
Europe
October 13	Zürich	Switzerland	Hallenstadion
October 15	Frankfurt	Germany	Jahrhunderthalle
October 16	Paris	France	Zénith Paris
October 17	Brussels	Belgium	Forest National
October 19	Cologne	Germany	Palladium Köln
October 21	Copenhagen	Denmark	Falconer Salen
October 22	Stockholm	Sweden	Annexet
October 23	Oslo	Norway	Sentrum Scene
October 25	Amsterdam	Netherlands	Ziggo Dome
October 28	London	England	The O_{2} Arena
October 29	Birmingham	England	Genting Arena
October 30	Manchester	England	Manchester Arena
North America
November 5	Baltimore	United States	Royal Farms Arena
November 6	Washington, D.C.	United States	Verizon Center
November 9	Philadelphia	United States	Wells Fargo Center
November 10	New York City	United States	Madison Square Garden
November 12	St. Louis	United States	Scottrade Center
November 14	Toronto	Canada	Air Canada Centre
November 16	Cleveland	United States	Quicken Loans Arena
November 18	Auburn Hills	United States	The Palace of Auburn Hills
November 19	Indianapolis	United States	Bankers Life Fieldhouse
November 20	Memphis	United States	FedExForum
November 22	Charlotte	United States	Spectrum Center
November 23	Richmond	United States	Richmond Coliseum
November 25	Atlanta	United States	Philips Arena
November 26	Greensboro	United States	Greensboro Coliseum
November 29	Miami	United States	American Airlines Arena
December 1	New Orleans	United States	Smoothie King Center
December 2	Dallas	United States	American Airlines Center
December 3	Houston	United States	Toyota Center
December 6	Inglewood	United States	The Forum
December 7	Oakland	United States	Oracle Arena
December 9	Las Vegas	United States	T-Mobile Arena
December 11	Bossier City	United States	CenturyLink Center
December 12	Kansas City	United States	Sprint Center
December 14	Chicago	United States	United Center

List of box office data, showing venue, city, country, attendance and revenue
Venue	City	Attendance (Tickets sold / available)	Gross revenue
The O_{2} Arena	London	9,940 / 12,701 (78%)	$924,133
Madison Square Garden	New York City	11,815 / 12,905 (91%)	$1,218,192
The Forum	Inglewood	11,727 / 12,365 (95%)	$1,083,016
