= Maxwell 08 Tour =

2008 concert tour by Maxwell

- Tour by Maxwell
- Associated album: None
- Start date: October 3, 2008
- End date: November 23, 2008
- Legs: 3
- No. of shows: 31 in United States; 1 in Africa; 1 in Europe; 33 in total

Maxwell concert chronology
- Now Tour (2001-02); Maxwell 08 Tour (2008); BLACKsummers'night Tour (2009)

The Maxwell 08 Tour was a tour by American R&B singer Maxwell, his first major tour in over six years. The tour started on October 3, performing a one date show in Europe and Africa, afterwards returning to North America for a two-month trek that kicked off on October 8, in Boston throughout several cities in North America and ending on November 23 in New York City. The singer performed new tracks from BLACKsummers'night scheduled for release summer of 2009, and songs from his previous albums.

== Opening Acts ==
- Jazmine Sullivan (USA—Leg)

== Set list ==
1. "Get to Know Ya"
2. "No One"
3. "Lifetime"
4. "This Woman's Work"
5. "Everwanting: To Want You to Want"
6. "Sumthin' Sumthin'"
7. "W/As my Girl
8. "Pretty Wings" (New)
9. "Simply Beautiful"
10. "Fortunate"
11. "...Til the Cops Come Knockin'"
12. "Bad Habits" (New)
13. "Help Somebody"^{1} (New)
14. "Cold" (New)
15. "Ascension (Don't Ever Wonder)"
16. "Whenever Wherever Whatever"

^{1} performed only on select dates in the U.S.

== Band ==
- Keyboards: Morris Pleasure
- Guitar: David Hod, Wah Wah Watson
- Bass: Sean Michael Ray
- Drums: Ricardo "Rick" Jordan
- Organs: Shedrick Mitchell
- Saxophone: Kenneth Wahlum lll
- Background vocals: Latina Webb

== Tour dates ==
Date	City	Country	Venue
Africa
October 3, 2008	Bloemfontein	South Africa	Macufe Music Festival
Europe
October 5, 2008	Amsterdam	Netherlands	Heineken Music Hall
North America
October 8, 2008	Boston	United States	Boston Opera House
October 9, 2008	New York City	United States	Radio City Music Hall
October 10, 2008	Wallingford	United States	Chevrolet Theatre
October 12, 2008	Toronto	Canada	Massey Hall
October 14, 2008	Cincinnati	United States	Taft Theatre
October 15, 2008	St. Louis	United States	Fox Theater
October 17, 2008	Indianapolis	United States	Murat Shrine
October 18, 2008	Chicago	United States	Chicago Theatre
October 19, 2008	Detroit	United States	Fox Theatre
October 21, 2008	Minneapolis	United States	Orpheum Theatre
October 22, 2008	Omaha	United States	Omaha Auditorium Music Hall
October 23, 2008	Kansas City	United States	Uptown Theater
October 25, 2008	Denver	United States	Paramount Theater
October 28, 2008	Oakland	United States	Paramount Theater
October 29, 2008	Oakland	United States	Paramount Theater
October 31, 2008	Las Vegas	United States	Pearl Concert Theater
November 1, 2008	Los Angeles	United States	Shrine Auditorium
November 2, 2008	Los Angeles	United States	Gibson Amphitheatre
November 3, 2008	Las Vegas	United States	House of Blues
November 6, 2008	Houston	United States	Verizon Wireless Theater
November 7, 2008	Houston	United States	Verizon Wireless Theater
November 8, 2008	Dallas	United States	Majestic Theatre
November 10, 2008	Birmingham	United States	BJCC Hall
November 11, 2008	Memphis	United States	Orpheum Theatre
November 12, 2008	Atlanta	United States	Atlanta Civic Center
November 14, 2008	Greensboro	United States	War Memorial Auditorium
November 15, 2008	Richmond	United States	Landmark Theater
November 17, 2008	Washington, D.C.	United States	DAR Constitution Hall
November 18, 2008	Washington, D.C.	United States	DAR Constitution Hall
November 19, 2008	Washington, D.C.	United States	DAR Constitution Hall
November 21, 2008	Philadelphia	United States	Susquehanna Bank Center
November 22, 2008	Baltimore	United States	Murphy Fine Arts Center
November 23, 2008	New York City	United States	United Palace Theater
