= NAACP Image Award for Outstanding Song =

American music award

This article lists the winners and nominees for the NAACP Image Award for Outstanding Song. The award was first given in 1972, before being retired until the 1996 ceremony. In 2017 the category was divided, honoring traditional and contemporary songs separately. Since its conception, Alicia Keys holds the record for most wins in this category with five.

== Winners and nominees ==
Winners are listed first and highlighted in bold.

=== 1970s ===
Year	Artist	Song	Ref
1972
1972	**Isaac Hayes**	**"Theme from Shaft"**	
1973 – 79	—N/a		

=== 1990s ===
Year	Artist	Song	Ref
1990 – 95	—N/a		
1996
1996	**Whitney Houston**	**"Exhale (Shoop Shoop)"**	
1996	D'Angelo	"Brown Sugar"	
1996	Coolio (featuring L.V.)	"Gangsta's Paradise"	
1996	TLC	"Waterfalls"	
1996	Michael Jackson	"You Are Not Alone"	
1997
1997	**R. Kelly**	**"I Believe I Can Fly"**	
1997	Tracy Chapman	"Give Me One Reason"	
1997	Fugees	"Killing Me Softly"	
1997	Blackstreet (featuring Dr. Dre and Queen Pen)	"No Diggity"	
1997	Toni Braxton	"Un-Break My Heart"	
1998
1998	**Boyz II Men**	**"A Song for Mama"**	
1998	Babyface	"Every Time I Close My Eyes"	
1998	Erykah Badu	"On & On"	
1998	En Vogue	"Don't Let Go (Love)"	
1998	God's Property (featuring Kirk Franklin and Cheryl James)	"Stomp"	
1999
1999	**Kirk Franklin**	**"Lean on Me"**	
1999	Aretha Franklin	"A Rose Is Still a Rose"	
1999	K-Ci & JoJo	"All My Life"	
1999	Lauryn Hill	"Doo Wop (That Thing)"	
1999	Whitney Houston & Mariah Carey	"When You Believe"	

=== 2000s ===
Year	Artist	Song	Ref
2000
2000	**Eric Benét (featuring Tamia)**	**"Spend My Life with You"**	
2000	Lauryn Hill	"Everything is Everything"	
2000	Whitney Houston	"My Love Is Your Love"	
2000	Lenny Kravitz	"Fly Away"	
2000	Chanté Moore	"Chanté's Got a Man"	
2001
2001	**Yolanda Adams**	**"Open My Heart"**	
2002
2002	**Alicia Keys**	**"A Woman's Worth"**	
2002	Alicia Keys	"Fallin'"	
2002	Jill Scott	"He Loves Me (Lyzel In E Flat)"	
2002	Musiq Soulchild	"Love"	
2002	Michael Jackson	"You Rock My World"	
2003
2003	**Kirk Franklin**	**"Brighter Day"**	
2003	India Arie	"Little Things"	
2003	Erykah Badu (featuring Common)	"Love of My Life (An Ode to Hip-Hop)"	
2003	Mary J. Blige	"No More Drama"	
2003	Missy Elliott	"Work It	
2004
2004	**Luther Vandross**	**"Dance with My Father"**	
2004	Beyoncé (feat. Jay Z)	"Crazy in Love"	
2004	Outkast	"Hey Ya!"	
2004	Outkast	"The Way You Move"	
2005
2005	**Alicia Keys**	**"If I Ain't Got You"**	
2005	Jill Scott	"Golden"	
2005	Usher (featuring Lil Jon and Ludacris)	"Yeah!"	
2006
2006	**Alicia Keys**	**"Unbreakable"**	
2006	Mariah Carey	"We Belong Together"	
2006	Common	"Testify"	
2006	Destiny's Child	"Stand Up for Love"	
2006	Kanye West	"Diamonds from Sierra Leone"	
2007
2007	**India Arie**	**"I Am Not My Hair"**	
2007	Gnarls Barkley	"Crazy"	
2007	Beyoncé	"Irreplaceable"	
2007	Mary J. Blige	"Be Without You"	
2007	John Legend	"Save Room"	
2008
2008	**Alicia Keys**	**"Like You'll Never See Me Again"**	
2008	India Arie	"Beautiful Flower"	
2008	Mary J. Blige	"Just Fine"	
2008	Rihanna (featuring Jay Z)	"Umbrella"	
2008	Kanye West	"Stronger"	
2009
2009	**will.i.am**	**"Yes We Can"**	
2009	Beyoncé	"Single Ladies (Put a Ring on It)"	
2009	Jennifer Hudson	"Spotlight"	
2009	Alicia Keys	"Superwoman"	
2009	John Legend	"Green Light"	

=== 2010s ===
Year	Artist	Song	Ref
2010
2010	**Mary Mary**	**"God in Me"**	
2010	Jamie Foxx (featuring T-Pain)	"Blame It"	
2010	Jay Z (featuring Alicia Keys)	"Empire State of Mind"	
2010	Maxwell	"Bad Habits"	
2010	Maxwell	"Pretty Wings"	
2011
2011	**Fantasia**	**"Bittersweet"**	
2011	CeeLo Green	"Fuck You"	
2011	Alicia Keys	"Un-Thinkable (I'm Ready)"	
2011	Maxwell	"Fistful of Tears"	
2011	Sade	"Soldier of Love"	
2012
2012	**Kirk Franklin**	**"I Smile"**	
2012	Adele	"Someone Like You"	
2012	Beyoncé	"Best Thing I Never Had"	
2012	CeeLo Green (featuring Melanie Fiona)	"Fool for You"	
2012	Jill Scott (featuring Anthony Hamilton)	"So in Love"	
2013
2013	**Whitney Houston and R. Kelly**	**"I Look to You"**	
2013	Kem	"Be Mine for Christmas"	
2013	Kem	"Glorify the King"	
2013	Kem	"You're on My Mind"	
2013	Bruno Mars	"Locked Out of Heaven"	
2014
2014	**John Legend**	**"All of Me"**	
2014	Alicia Keys (featuring Maxwell)	"Fire We Make"	
2014	Bruno Mars	"Treasure"	
2014	Janelle Monáe (featuring Erykah Badu)	"Q.U.E.E.N."	
2014	Robin Thicke (featuring T.I. and Pharrell Williams)	"Blurred Lines"	
2015
2015	**Alicia Keys**	**"We Are Here"**	
2015	Beyoncé	"Pretty Hurts"	
2015	Aloe Blacc	"The Man"	
2015	Kendrick Lamar	"i"	
2015	Usher	"Good Kisser"	
2016
2016	**Jill Scott**	**"Back Together"**	
2016	Lauryn Hill	"Feeling Good"	
2016	Seal	"Every Time I'm with You"	
2016	Jazmine Sullivan	"Let It Burn"	
2016	Charlie Wilson	"Goodnight Kisses"	
2017
2017	**Kim Burrell and Pharrell Williams**	**"I See Victory"**	
2017	Anthony Hamilton	"Amen"	
2017	Tamela Mann	"God Provides"	
2017	Maxwell	"Lake by the Ocean"	
2017	Solange	"Cranes in the Sky"	
2017	**Beyoncé (featuring Kendrick Lamar)**	**"Freedom"**	
2017	Common (featuring Bilal)	"Letter to the Free"	
2017	Bruno Mars	"24K Magic"	
2017	Sounds of Blackness (featuring High School for Recording Arts)	"Royalty"	
2017	Beyoncé	Formation	
2018
2018	**Bruno Mars**	**"That's What I Like"**	
2018	Ledisi	"High"	
2018	MAJOR.	"Honest"	
2018	John Legend	"Surefire" (Piano Version)	
2018	Mary J. Blige	"U + Me (Love Lesson)"	
2018	**Kendrick Lamar**	**"HUMBLE."**	
2018	JAY-Z	"The Story of O.J."	
2018	Mali Music	"Gonna Be Alright"	
2018	Jazmine Sullivan x Bryson Tiller	"Insecure"	
2018	SZA feat. Travis Scott	"Love Galore"	
2019
2019	**Ella Mai**	**"Boo'd Up"**	
2019	John Legend feat. BloodPop	"A Good Night"	
2019	Bruno Mars feat. Cardi B	"Finesse (Remix)"	
2019	Childish Gambino	"This Is America"	
2019	H.E.R.	"As I Am"	
2019	**Toni Braxton**	**"Long as I Live"**	
2019	Andra Day	"Amen"	
2019	MAJOR.	"Better With You In It"	
2019	Leon Bridges	"Beyond"	
2019	Tori Kelly feat. Kirk Franklin	"Never Alone"	

=== 2020s ===
Year	Artist	Song	Ref
2020
2020	**Beyoncé**	**"Before I Let Go"**	
2020	H.E.R.	"Hard Place"	
2020	Lizzo	"Juice"	
2020	Normani	"Motivation"	
2020	Khalid	"Talk"	
2020	**Beyoncé**	**"Spirit"**	
2020	Fantasia	"Enough"	
2020	Lizzo	"Jerome"	
2020	Cynthia Erivo	"Stand Up"	
2020	India Arie	"Steady Love"	

== Multiple wins and nominations ==
=== Wins ===
5 wins

- Alicia Keys

3 wins

- Beyoncé

2 wins

- Kirk Franklin
- Whitney Houston
- Kendrick Lamar
- R. Kelly

=== Nominations ===
10 nominations

- Alicia Keys

9 nominations

- Beyoncé

5 nominations

- Kirk Franklin
- John Legend
- Bruno Mars
- Maxwell

4 nominations

- India Arie
- Mary J. Blige

3 nominations

- Erykah Badu
- Common
- Whitney Houston
- Kem
- Kendrick Lamar
- Jill Scott

2 nominations

- Fantasia
- CeeLo Green
- Anthony Hamilton
- H.E.R.
- Lauryn Hill
- R. Kelly
- Lizzo
- MAJOR.
- Jazmine Sullivan
- Usher
- Kanye West
- Pharrell Williams
