= Maxwell & Jill Scott: The Tour =

2010 concert tour by Maxwell and Jill Scott

- Tour by Maxwell & Jill Scott
- Promotional poster for tour
- Associated album: BLACKsummers'night
- Start date: May 21, 2010
- End date: June 26, 2010
- Legs: 1
- No. of shows: 20
Jill Scott tour chronology
The Real Thing Tour (2008)	Maxwell & Jill Scott: The Tour (2010)	Summer Block Party (2011)
Maxwell tour chronology
BLACKsummers'night Tour (2009)	Maxwell & Jill Scott: The Tour (2010)

Maxwell & Jill Scott: The Tour is a co-headlining concert tour by American recording artists Maxwell and Jill Scott. Heavily playing in the United States, the tour supported Maxwell's fourth studio album BLACKsummers'night. Singer Erykah Badu joined as a featured performer on select dates. Maxwell and Scott planned a second leg of the tour for the summer of 2010 (with Melanie Fiona as an opening act), however the leg was canceled abruptly. It was later revealed Maxwell postponed the tour dates until 2011, without Scott joining.

== Background ==
Following the success of his album and 2009 tour with Common, Maxwell continued promoting his album in the U.S. and other countries for an arena tour with Jill Scott. The tour was announced by various media outlets in March 2010. Many critics deemed the tour an ideal pairing, contrasting the different styles of the artists. Although his last tour was successful, Maxwell admitted to prefer playing small venues for their intimate feel but felt he need to "[tour] bigger". He continued, "Last year, I did a bunch of arenas with Common. It wasn't what I expected. I love a small club; I love a small theater. But it was time for me to do something new, to stretch a bit. You've got to think big. I like to walk around during sound check. Then I know, 'Oh, this is what it's like to be over here, looking at the stage.'" Scott was set to release her fourth album during the run of the tour, however, it was postponed until 2011. To introduce the tour, she stated:

"[The show] a great night for music lovers. And everyone who wants to shake a little tail feather or feel romantic, whatever the case may be"

=== Second leg cancellation ===
Despite the success of the first leg of the tour, Maxwell decided to cancel the remaining dates of the tour at the last moment. An official statement was released citing "scheduling conflicts with venues" was the reason behind the cancellation. However, media outlets began to speculate a true reason for the tour's cancellation. Many reported the singer was upset at Scott and special guest Badu going over their set times, with Maxwell being the last performer on the tour. The singer stated he would postpone dates until his 2011 for his fifth studio album, blackSUMMERs'night.

== Opening Act ==
- Guy Torry (select dates)

== Set list ==
Jill Scott

1. "Gimme"
2. "The Real Thing"
3. "Whatever"
4. "Insomnia"
5. "It’s Love"
6. "Not like Crazy"
7. "The Way"
8. "Come See Me"
9. "Crown Royal"
10. "I Love You"
11. "Cross My Mind"
12. "Hear My Call"
13. "He Loves Me (Lyzel In E Flat)"
14. "Hate on Me"
15. "A Long Walk"
16. "Golden"

Maxwell

17. "Sumthin' Sumthin'"
18. "Get to Know Ya"
19. "Cold"
20. "Lifetime"
21. "Bad Habits"
22. "Help Somebody"
23. "This Woman’s Work"
24. "Fistful of Tears"
25. "Stop the World"
26. "Reunion"
27. ". . . Til the Cops Come Knockin’
28. "Don't Say Goodnight (It's Time for Love)"
29. "Fortunate"
30. "Ascension (Don't Ever Wonder)"
31. "Pretty Wings"

== Tour dates ==
List of 2010 concerts
Date	City	Country	Venue
May 21, 2010	Cleveland	United States	Quicken Loans Arena
May 22, 2010	Auburn Hills	United States	The Palace of Auburn Hills
May 23, 2010	Pittsburgh	United States	Petersen Event Center
May 24, 2010	Indianapolis	United States	Conseco Fieldhouse
May 25, 2010	Chicago	United States	United Center
May 27, 2010	Milwaukee	United States	Bradley Center
May 29, 2010	St. Louis	United States	Scottrade Center
May 30, 2010	Kansas City	United States	Starlight Theatre
June 2, 2010	Seattle	United States	KeyArena
June 4, 2010	Oakland	United States	Oracle Arena
June 5, 2010	Los Angeles	United States	Staples Center
June 8, 2010	Dallas	United States	American Airlines Center
June 9, 2010	Houston	United States	Toyota Center
June 11, 2010	Atlanta	United States	Philips Arena
June 12, 2010	Atlanta	United States	Philips Arena
June 14, 2010	Miami	United States	American Airlines Arena
June 15, 2010	Tampa	United States	St. Pete Times Forum
June 18, 2010	Washington, D.C.	United States	Verizon Center
June 19, 2010	Philadelphia	United States	Wachovia Center
June 25, 2010	New York City	United States	Madison Square Garden
June 26, 2010	New York City	United States	Madison Square Garden

Cancellations and rescheduled shows

June 28, 2010	Greensoboro	Greensboro Coliseum	Canceled
June 29, 2010	Charlotte	Time Warner Cable Arena	Canceled
July 1, 2010	Columbia	Colonial Life Arena	Canceled
July 3, 2010	Pensacola	Pensacola Civic Center	Canceled
July 6, 2010	Nashville	Bridgestone Arena	Canceled
July 7, 2010	Highland Heights	The Bank of Kentucky Center	Canceled
July 9, 2010	Columbus	Nationwide Arena	Canceled
July 12, 2010	Buffalo	HSBC Arena	Canceled
July 13, 2010	Boston	Bank of America Pavilion	Canceled
July 15, 2010	Baltimore	1st Mariner Arena	Canceled
