= NAACP Image Award for Outstanding Music Video =

American music award

This article lists the winners and nominees for the NAACP Image Award for Outstanding Music Video. Currently Alicia Keys holds the record for most wins in this category with five.

== Winners and nominees ==
Winners are listed first and highlighted in bold.

=== 1990s ===
Year	Artist	Video	Ref
1992
1992	**Natalie Cole**	**"Unforgettable"**	
1992	Gladys Knight	"Men"	
1992	Boyz II Men	"Motownphilly"	
1992	Luther Vandross	"Power of Love"	
1992	DJ Jazzy Jeff & The Fresh Prince	"Summertime"	
1993
1993	**Michael Jackson**	**"Black or White"**	
1993	Boyz II Men	"End of the Road"	
1993	Kris Kross	"Jump"	
1993	En Vogue	"My Lovin' (You're Never Gonna Get It)"	
1993	Arrested Development	"Tennessee"	
1994
1994	**Whitney Houston**	**"I'm Every Woman"**	
1995	—N/a		
1996
1996	**TLC**	**"Waterfalls"**	
1996	D'Angelo	"Brown Sugar"	
1996	Janet Jackson	"Runaway"	
1996	Michael Jackson & Janet Jackson	"Scream"	
1996	Michael Jackson	"Earth Song"	
1997
1997	**R. Kelly**	**"I Believe I Can Fly"**	
1997	Dr. Dre	"Been There, Done That"	
1997	Prince	"Betcha by Golly Wow!"	
1997	Toni Braxton	"You're Makin' Me High"	
1997	Toni Braxton	"Un-Break My Heart"	
1998
1998	**God's Property**	**"Stomp"**	
1998	Babyface	"Every Time I Close My Eyes"	
1998	Boyz II Men	"4 Seasons of Loneliness"	
1998	Will Smith	"Men in Black"	
1998	Erykah Badu	"Next Lifetime"	
1999
1999	**Will Smith**	**"Just the Two of Us"**	
1999	Aretha Franklin	"A Rose Is Still a Rose"	
1999	Aaliyah	"Are You That Somebody?"	
1999	Brandy & Monica	"The Boy Is Mine"	
1999	Whitney Houston & Mariah Carey	"When You Believe"	

=== 2000s ===
Year	Artist	Video	Ref
2000
2000	**Will Smith**	**"Wild Wild West"**	
2000	Lauryn Hill	"Everything is Everything"	
2000	R. Kelly	"If I Could Turn Back the Hands of Time"	
2000	TLC	"No Scrubs"	
2000	TLC	"Unpretty"	
2001
2001	**R. Kelly**	**"I Wish"**	
2001	Aaliyah	"Try Again"	
2001	Eric Benét	"When You Think of Me"	
2001	Mary J. Blige	"Your Child"	
2001	Janet Jackson	"Doesn't Really Matter"	
2002
2002	**Michael Jackson**	**"You Rock My World"**	
2002	Aaliyah	"Rock the Boat"	
2002	The Isley Brothers (feat. R. Kelly and Chanté Moore)	"Contagious"	
2002	Janet Jackson	"All for You"	
2002	Alicia Keys	"Fallin'"	
2003
2003	**India Arie**	**"Little Things**	
2003	Erykah Badu and Common	"Love of My Life (An Ode to Hip-Hop)"	
2003	Mary J. Blige	"No More Drama"	
2003	LL Cool J	"Luv U Better"	
2003	Usher	"U Don't Have to Call"	
2004
2004	**Luther Vandross**	**"Dance with My Father"**	
2004	Beyoncé (feat. Jay Z)	"Crazy in Love"	
2004	India Arie	"The Truth"	
2004	Outkast	"Hey Ya!"	
2004	Outkast	"The Way You Move"	
2005
2005	**Alicia Keys**	**"If I Ain't Got You"**	
2005	Jill Scott	"Golden"	
2005	Usher and Alicia Keys	"My Boo"	
2005	Usher (feat. Ludacris and Lil Jon)	"Yeah!"	
2005	Kanye West	"Jesus Walks"	
2006
2006	**Alicia Keys**	**"Unbreakable"**	
2006	Common	"Testify"	
2006	Mariah Carey	"We Belong Together"	
2006	Destiny's Child	"Stand Up for Love"	
2006	Kanye West	"Diamonds from Sierra Leone"	
2007
2007	**Mary J. Blige**	**"Be Without You"**	
2007	Beyoncé	"Irreplaceable"	
2007	India Arie	"I Am Not My Hair"	
2007	Jay Z	"Show Me What You Got"	
2007	Prince	"Black Sweat"	
2008
2008	**Alicia Keys**	**"Like You'll Never See Me Again"**	
2008	Beyoncé and Shakira	"Beautiful Liar"	
2008	Mary J. Blige	"Just Fine"	
2008	John Legend	"Show Me"	
2008	Kanye West	"Stronger"	
2009
2009	**will.i.am**	**"Yes We Can"**	
2009	Beyoncé	"If I Were a Boy"	
2009	Beyoncé	"Single Ladies (Put a Ring on It)"	
2009	Jennifer Hudson	"Spotlight"	
2009	Alicia Keys	"Superwoman"	

=== 2010s ===
Year	Artist	Video	Ref
2010
2010	**Whitney Houston**	**"I Look to You"**	
2010	The Black Eyed Peas	"Boom Boom Pow"	
2010	Jamie Foxx (feat. T-Pain)	"Blame It"	
2010	Alicia Keys	"Try Sleeping with a Broken Heart"	
2010	Maxwell	"Pretty Wings"	
2011
2011	**Alicia Keys**	**"Un-Thinkable (I'm Ready)"**	
2011	Beyoncé	"Why Don't You Love Me"	
2011	Maxwell	"Fistful of Tears"	
2011	Sade	"Soldier of Love"	
2011	Willow Smith	"Whip My Hair"	
2012
2012	**Jennifer Hudson**	**"Where You At?"**	
2012	Adele	"Someone Like You"	
2012	Beyoncé	"I Was Here"	
2012	Mary J. Blige	"25/8"	
2012	Jill Scott	"Hear My Call"	
2013
2013	**Alicia Keys**	**"Girl on Fire"**	
2013	CeeLo Green	"This Christmas"	
2013	Kem	"You're on My Mind"	
2013	Bruno Mars	"Locked Out of Heaven"	
2013	Miguel	"Adorn"	
2014
2014	**Janelle Monáe (feat. Erykah Badu)**	**"Q.U.E.E.N."**	
2014	India Arie	"Cocoa Butter"	
2014	Alicia Keys (feat. Maxwell)	"Fire We Make"	
2014	John Legend	"Made to Love"	
2014	Bruno Mars	"Treasure"	
2015
2015	**John Legend**	**"You & I (Nobody in the World)"**	
2015	Beyoncé	"Pretty Hurts"	
2015	Michael Jackson (feat. Justin Timberlake)	"Love Never Felt So Good"	
2015	Kem	"It's You"	
2015	Kendrick Lamar	"i"	
2016
2016	**Tyrese Gibson**	**"Shame"**	
2016	Alabama Shakes	"Sound & Color"	
2016	Janet Jackson (feat. J. Cole)	"No Sleeep"	
2016	The Weeknd	"Can't Feel My Face"	
2016	Pharrell Williams	"Freedom"	
2017
2017	**Beyoncé**	**"Formation"**	
2017	Johnny Gill (feat. New Edition)	"This One's for Me and You"	
2017	Alicia Keys	"In Common"	
2017	Bruno Mars	"24K Magic"	
2017	Solange	"Cranes in the Sky"	
2018
2018	**Bruno Mars**	**"That's What I Like"**	
2018	Mary J. Blige	"Strength of a Woman"	
2018	JAY-Z	"4:44"	
2018	Maxwell	"Gods"	
2018	Ledisi	"High"	
2019
2019	**Childish Gambino**	**"This Is America"**	
2019	The Carters	"Apeshit"	
2019	H.E.R. (feat. Bryson Tiller)	"Could've Been"	
2019	Bruno Mars (feat. Cardi B)	"Finesse (Remix)"	
2019	Kendrick Lamar & SZA	"All the Stars"	

=== 2020s ===
Year	Artist	Video	Ref
2020
2020	**Lizzo**	**"Juice"**	
2020	H.E.R.	"Hard Place"	
2020	Chris Brown (feat. Drake)	"No Guidance"	
2020	India Arie	"Steady Love"	
2020	Khalid	"Talk"	
2021
2021	**Beyoncé, Wizkid, Saint Jhn, Blue Ivy Carter**	**"Brown Skin Girl"**	
2021	H.E.R.	"I Can't Breathe"	
2021	Ledisi	"Anything For You"	
2021	Beyoncé	Black Is King	
2021	Chloe x Halle	"Do It"	
2022
2022	**Wizkid (feat. Tems)**	**"Essence"**	
2022	Saweetie (feat. Doja Cat)	"Best Friend"	
2022	Tobe Nwigwe (feat. Fat Nwigwe)	"Fye Fye"	
2022	Chlöe	"Have Mercy"	
2022	Silk Sonic	"Leave the Door Open"	
2023
2023	**Rihanna**	**"Lift Me Up"**	
2023	Lizzo	"About Damn Time"	
2023	Beyoncé	"Be Alive"	
2023	EarthGang, Pharrell Williams and Tobe Nwigwe	"Lord Forgive Me"	
2023	Kendrick Lamar	"The Heart Part 5"	
2024
2024	**Chris Brown (feat. Davido and Lojay)**	**"Sensational"**	
2024	Usher	"Boyfriend"	
2024	Megan Thee Stallion	"Cobra"	
2024	Ciara and Chris Brown	"How We Roll"	
2024	Victoria Monét	"On My Mama"	
2025
2025	**Kendrick Lamar**	**"Not Like Us"**	
2025	Victoria Monét	"Alright"	
2025	Doechii and JT	"Alter Ego (ALTERnate Version)"	
2025	Chlöe	"Boy Bye"	
2025	GloRilla	"Yeah Glo!"	
2026
2026	**Kendrick Lamar (feat. SZA)**	**"Luther"**	
2026	Doechii	"Anxiety"	
2026	803Fresh	"Boots on the Ground"	
2026	Teyana Taylor	Escape Room	
2026	Kehlani	"Folded"	

== Multiple wins and nominations ==
=== Wins ===
5 wins

- Alicia Keys

2 wins

- Whitney Houston
- Michael Jackson
- R. Kelly
- Will Smith
- Beyoncé
- Kendrick Lamar

=== Nominations ===
12 nominations

- Alicia Keys
- Beyoncé

5 nominations

- Bruno Mars
- Mary J. Blige
- Janet Jackson
- Michael Jackson
- India Arie
- Kendrick Lamar

4 nominations

- Usher

3 nominations

- R. Kelly
- H.E.R.
- John Legend
- Maxwell
- TLC
- Kanye West
- Aaliyah
- Whitney Houston
- Chris Brown
- Chlöe (including with Chloe x Halle)

2 nominations

- Erykah Badu
- Common
- Doechii
- Jennifer Hudson
- Kem
- Ledisi
- Lizzo
- Victoria Monét
- Tobe Nwigwe
- Outkast
- Jill Scott
- Will Smith
- SZA
- Pharrell Williams
