= 41st NAACP Image Awards =

American entertainment awards for 2009 works

- Date: February 26, 2010
- Site: Shrine Auditorium, Los Angeles, California
- Hosted by: Hill Harper and Anika Noni Rose

Highlights
- Best Picture: Precious
- Best Comedy Series: Tyler Perry's House of Payne
- Best Drama Series: Lincoln Heights'
- Most nominations: Precious (8)

Television coverage
- Network: Fox

The 41st NAACP Image Awards ceremony, presented by the National Association for the Advancement of Colored People (NAACP), honored outstanding representations and achievements of people of color in motion pictures, television, music, and literature during the 2009 calendar year. The ceremony was hosted by Hill Harper and Anika Noni Rose at the Shrine Auditorium and aired on February 26, 2010 on Fox.

The nominations were announced on January 6, 2010 with the film Precious leading the motion picture categories with 8 nominations. American rapper Jay-Z led the nominees in the music category with five nods.

The nominees are listed below with the winners in bold.

== Motion Picture ==
Outstanding Motion Picture	Outstanding Directing in a Motion Picture
**Precious**; The Blind Side; Invictus; Michael Jackson's This Is It; The Princess and the Frog	**Lee Daniels** - **Precious**; F. Gary Gray - Law Abiding Citizen; George Tillman Jr - Notorious; Scott Sanders - Black Dynamite; Spike Lee - Passing Stranger: The Movie
Outstanding Actor in a Motion Picture	Outstanding Actress in a Motion Picture
**Morgan Freeman - Invictus**; Denzel Washington - The Taking of Pelham 123; Idris Elba - Obsessed; Jamie Foxx - Law Abiding Citizen; Quinton Aaron - The Blind Side	**Gabourey Sidibe - Precious**; Sandra Bullock - The Blind Side; Taraji P. Henson - Tyler Perry's I Can Do Bad All By Myself; Sophie Okonedo - Skin; Anika Noni Rose - The Princess and the Frog
Outstanding Supporting Actor in a Motion Picture	Outstanding Supporting Actress in a Motion Picture
**Adam Rodriguez - Tyler Perry's I Can Do Bad All By Myself**; Chiwetel Ejiofor - 2012; Danny Glover - 2012; Lenny Kravitz - Precious; Anthony Mackie - The Hurt Locker	**Mo'Nique - Precious**; Mariah Carey - Precious; Paula Patton - Precious; Zoe Saldaña - Avatar; Alfre Woodard - American Violet
Outstanding Foreign Motion Picture	Outstanding Independent Motion Picture
**The Stoning of Soraya M.**; The Maid; Rudo y Cursi; Sin Nombre; Skin	**Precious**; American Violet; Amreeka; Endgame; Medicine for Melancholy
Outstanding Documentary	Outstanding Writing in a Motion Picture
**Good Hair**; Capitalism: A Love Story; Crips and Bloods: Made in America; Crude; More Than a Game	**Geoffrey S. Fletcher** - **Precious**; Anthony Peckham - Invictus; John Lee Hancock - The Blind Side; Reggie Rock Bythewood and Cheo Hodari Coker - Notorious; Tyler Perry - Tyler Perry's I Can Do Bad All By Myself

== Television ==
=== Outstanding Comedy Series ===
- **Tyler Perry's House of Payne**
- 30 Rock
- Everybody Hates Chris
- Glee
- Ugly Betty

=== Outstanding Actor in a Comedy Series ===
- **Daryl Mitchell - Brothers**
- LaVan Davis - Tyler Perry's House of Payne
- Donald Faison - Scrubs
- Dulé Hill - Psych
- Tyler James Williams - Everybody Hates Chris

=== Outstanding Actress in a Comedy Series ===
- **Cassi Davis - Tyler Perry's House of Payne**
- Tichina Arnold - Everybody Hates Chris
- America Ferrera - Ugly Betty
- C.C.H. Pounder - Brothers
- Sherri Shepherd - Sherri

=== Outstanding Supporting Actor in a Comedy Series ===
- **Lance Gross - Tyler Perry's House of Payne**
- Tracy Morgan - 30 Rock
- Lamman Rucker - Tyler Perry's House of Payne
- Larenz Tate - Rescue Me
- Malcolm-Jamal Warner - Sherri

=== Outstanding Supporting Actress in a Comedy Series ===
- **Keshia Knight Pulliam - Tyler Perry's House of Payne**
- Tisha Campbell-Martin - Rita Rocks
- Ana Ortiz - Ugly Betty
- Wendy Raquel Robinson - The Game
- Vanessa Williams - Ugly Betty

=== Outstanding Drama Series ===
- **Lincoln Heights**
- Cold Case
- Grey's Anatomy
- HawthoRNe
- The No.1 Ladies Detective Agency

=== Outstanding Actor in a Drama Series ===
- **Hill Harper - CSI: NY**
- Anthony Anderson - Law & Order
- Taye Diggs - Private Practice
- Laurence Fishburne - CSI: Crime Scene Investigation
- LL Cool J - NCIS: Los Angeles

=== Outstanding Actress in a Drama Series ===
- **Jada Pinkett Smith - HawthoRNe**
- Regina King - Southland
- Sandra Oh - Grey's Anatomy
- Jill Scott - The No.1 Ladies Detective Agency
- Chandra Wilson - Grey's Anatomy

=== Outstanding Supporting Actor in a Drama Series ===
- **Delroy Lindo - Law & Order: Special Victims Unit**
- Rocky Carroll - NCIS
- Mekhi Phifer - Lie to Me
- James Pickens Jr. - Grey's Anatomy
- Corey Reynolds - The Closer

=== Outstanding Supporting Actress in a Drama Series ===
- **S. Epatha Merkerson - Law & Order**
- Audra McDonald - Private Practice
- Anika Noni Rose - The No.1 Ladies Detective Agency
- Gabrielle Union - Flash Forward
- Jurnee Smollett - Friday Night Lights

=== Outstanding Television Movie, Mini-Series, or Dramatic Special ===
- **Gifted Hands**
- America
- Brick City
- Georgia O'Keeffe
- Relative Stranger

=== Outstanding Actor in a Television Movie, Mini-Series, or Dramatic Special ===
- **Cuba Gooding Jr. - Gifted Hands**
- Eriq La Salle - Relative Stranger
- Gus Hoffman - Gifted Hands
- Jaishon Fisher - Gifted Hands
- Phillip Johnson - America

=== Outstanding Actress in a Television Movie, Mini-Series, or Dramatic Special ===
- **Kimberly Elise - Gifted Hands**
- Aunjanue Ellis - Gifted Hands
- Cicely Tyson - Relative Stranger
- Rosie O'Donnell - America
- Ruby Dee - America

=== Outstanding Actor in a Daytime Drama Series ===
*Cornelius Smith Jr. - All My Children

- Bryton James - The Young and the Restless
- Cassius Willis - The Young and the Restless
- Terrell Tilford - One Life to Live
- Texas Battle - The Bold and the Beautiful

=== Outstanding Actress in a Daytime Drama Series ===
*Debbi Morgan - All My Children

- Daphnee Duplaix - One Life to Live
- Eva Marcille - The Young and the Restless
- Tatyana Ali - The Young and the Restless
- Tonya Lee Williams - The Young and the Restless

=== Outstanding News/Information - (Series or Special) ===
- **The Inauguration of Barack Obama, 44th President of the United States**
- Anderson Cooper 360: President Obama's African Journey
- CNN Presents: Reclaiming the Dream 2
- Judge Mathis
- Leading Women: India.Arie, Dr. Maya Angelou

=== Outstanding Talk Series ===
*The Mo'Nique Show

- Lopez Tonight
- The Tyra Banks Show
- The View
- The Wanda Sykes Show

=== Outstanding Reality Series ===
*Extreme Makeover: Home Edition

- American Idol
- America's Next Top Model
- Dancing with the Stars
- Real Housewives of Atlanta

=== Outstanding Variety ===
- **The Michael Jackson Memorial: Celebrating the Life of Michael Jackson**
- BET Awards 2009
- Bill Cosby: The Kennedy Center Mark Twain Prize for American Humor
- Wanda Sykes: I'ma Be Me
- We Are One: The Obama Inaugural Celebration at the Lincoln Memorial

=== Outstanding Children's Program ===
*Dora the Explorer

- The Backyardigans
- Go, Diego, Go!
- True Jackson, VP
- Wizards of Waverly Place: The Movie

=== Outstanding Performance in a Youth/Children's Program - (Series or Special) ===
- **Keke Palmer - True Jackson VP**
- Caitlin Sanchez - Dora the Explorer
- LaShawn Jefferies - The Backyardigans
- Nick Cannon - 2009 Nickelodeon HALO Awards
- Selena Gomez - Wizards of Waverly Place

== Writing ==
=== Outstanding Writing in a Comedy Series ===
*The Office

- Brothers
- The Game
- The Simpsons
- Psych

=== Outstanding Writing in a Dramatic Series ===
*Grey's Anatomy

- True Blood
- Lincoln Heights
- House
- Grey's Anatomy

== Directing ==
=== Outstanding Directing for a Comedy Series ===
*30 Rock

- Community
- Drop Dead Diva
- Everybody Hates Chris
- The Office

=== Outstanding Directing for a Dramatic Series ===
*Grey's Anatomy

- Battlestar Galactica
- CSI: Crime Scene Investigation
- Dexter
- Lincoln Heights

== Recording ==
=== Outstanding New Artist ===
*Keri Hilson

- Jeremih
- K'Jon
- Kristinia DeBarge
- Melanie Fiona

=== Outstanding Male Artist ===
*Maxwell

- Anthony Hamilton
- Charlie Wilson
- Jay-Z
- Ne-Yo

=== Outstanding Female Artist ===
*Mary J. Blige

- Alicia Keys
- India.Arie
- Rihanna
- Whitney Houston

=== Outstanding Duo, Group, or Collaboration ===
- **The Black Eyed Peas**
- 3 Mo' Divas
- Day26
- Jay-Z featuring Alicia Keys - "Empire State of Mind
- Jay-Z featuring Rihanna and Kanye West - "Run This Town"

=== Outstanding Jazz Album ===
*He and She - Wynton Marsalis

- Detroit - Gerald Wilson Orchestra
- Kind of Brown - Christian McBride & Inside Straight
- Poetically Justified - Marcus Johnson
- The Real Thing - Vanessa Williams

=== Outstanding Gospel Album ===
*Still - BeBe & CeCe Winans

- A City Called Heaven - Shirley Caesar
- How I Got Over - Vickie Winans
- Love Unstoppable - Fred Hammond
- We Are All One: Live In Detroit - Donnie McClurkin

=== Outstanding Music Video ===
*I Look to You - Whitney Houston

- Blame It - Jamie Foxx featuring T-Pain
- Boom Boom Pow - The Black Eyed Peas
- Pretty Wings - Maxwell
- Try Sleeping with a Broken Heart - Alicia Keys

=== Outstanding Song ===
*God in Me - Mary Mary

- Bad Habits - Maxwell
- Blame It - Jamie Foxx featuring T-Pain
- Empire State of Mind - Jay-Z featuring Alicia Keys
- Pretty Wings - Maxwell

=== Outstanding Album ===
*Stronger with Each Tear - Mary J. Blige

- The Blueprint 3 - Jay-Z
- BLACKsummers'night - Maxwell
- The Element of Freedom - Alicia Keys
- Memoirs of an Imperfect Angel - Mariah Carey
