= Blacksummers'night =

Blacksummers'night may refer to:

- BLACKsummers'night (2009), an album by Maxwell
- blackSUMMERS'night (2016), an album by Maxwell
