= MTV Unplugged (Maxwell EP) =

Live album (EP) by Maxwell
- Released: July 15, 1997
- Recorded: May 7, 1997
- Venues: Brooklyn Academy of Music, New York City, New York
- Genres: R&B; neo soul
- Length: 34:18
- Labels: Columbia; CK 68515
- Producer: MUSZE (Maxwell)

Maxwell chronology
Maxwell's Urban Hang Suite (1996)	MTV Unplugged (1997)	Embrya (1998)

MTV Unplugged is a live EP by American neo soul singer Maxwell, released by Columbia Records in mid-1997. The album features recordings of Maxwell's performance on the MTV concert series program MTV Unplugged, filmed in New York City earlier in the year. The album includes covers of songs such as Kate Bush's "This Woman's Work" and Nine Inch Nails "Closer."

The singer was asked to do MTV Unplugged, despite only having released only one album, Maxwell's Urban Hang Suite. Maxwell's episode of MTV Unplugged first aired on the network on July 22, 1997".

The live version of "Whenever Wherever Whatever" was nominated for the Grammy Award for Best Male Pop Vocal Performance at the 40th Grammy Awards, but it lost to "Candle in the Wind 1997" by Elton John.

== Background ==
Despite only having released only one album, the music video television channel MTV saw his burgeoning popularity and asked him to tape an episode of the concert series MTV Unplugged in New York City. The show was taped live on June 15, 1997, and he performed his own songs as well as covers of songs by Kate Bush ("This Woman's Work") and Nine Inch Nails ("Closer"). He clashed with his label about the release of a full album of his session, resulting in the release of only an extended play, or EP instead, containing seven songs. The MTV Unplugged performance of "...Til the Cops Come Knockin" was included as a bonus track on the international release. The episode of MTV Unplugged first aired on the network on July 22, 1997".

Professional ratings
Review scores
Source	Rating
Allmusic	3/5 stars
Entertainment Weekly	(C)
NY Amsterdam News	(favorable)
Rhapsody	(favorable)
Yahoo! Music	(favorable)

== Track listing ==
No.	Title	Writer(s)	Length
1.	"The Suite Urban Theme"	Maxwell	5:17
2.	"Mello: Sumthin (The Hush)"	Maxwell	3:05
3.	"The Lady Suite"	Maxwell, Hod David	4:20
4.	"This Woman's Work"	Kate Bush	4:25
5.	"Whenever Wherever Whatever"	Maxwell, Stuart Matthewman	4:45
6.	"Ascension (Don't Ever Wonder)"	Maxwell, Itaal Shur	4:10
7.	"Gotta Get: Closer"	Maxwell, Trent Reznor	7:16
8.	"...Til the Cops Come Knockin" (international bonus track)	Maxwell, David	6:41

== Charts ==
Chart (1997)	Peak Position
The Billboard 200 (U.S.)	53
U.S. Top R&B/Hip-Hop Albums	15
French Albums Chart	26
Dutch Albums Chart	58
UK Albums Chart	45

== Certifications ==
Region	Certification	Certified units/sales
United States (RIAA)	Gold	500,000^{^}
^{^} Shipments figures based on certification alone.

== See also ==
- List of artists featured on MTV Unplugged
