= Now (Maxwell album) =

Studio album by Maxwell
- Released: August 14, 2001
- Recorded: 2000–01
- Genre: R&B; neo soul
- Length: 50:15
- Label: Columbia
- Producer: MUSZE (Maxwell)

Maxwell chronology
Embrya (1998)	Now (2001)	BLACKsummers'night (2009)

Singles from Now
- 1. "Get to Know Ya" Released: February 15, 2001; 2. "Lifetime" Released: October 16, 2001; 3. "This Woman's Work" Released: January 15, 2002

Now is the third studio album by American R&B singer Maxwell. It was released on August 14, 2001, by Columbia Records. Following the lukewarm critical reception of his 1998 record Embrya, Maxwell pursued a different direction while recording Now, abandoning the conceptual style of his previous albums.

Now received positive reviews and became Maxwell's first album to reach number one on the Billboard 200, selling over 296,000 units in the U.S. in the first week, according to Nielsen SoundScan, and was later certified platinum by the Recording Industry Association of America (RIAA). The album's third single "This Woman's Work", a live staple of Maxwell's, charted at number 58 on the Hot 100 and at number 16 on the Hot R&B/Hip-Hop Songs chart. Now was Maxwell's last album before an eight-year hiatus, which culminated in the release of his fourth studio album BLACKsummers'night (2009).

== Critical reception ==
Professional ratings
Review scores
Source	Rating
AllMusic	4/5 stars
Boston Herald	4/4 stars
The Encyclopedia of Popular Music	3/5 stars
Entertainment Weekly	A−
Los Angeles Times	3/4 stars
Mixmag	5/5 stars
Q	3/5 stars
Rolling Stone	3/5 stars
Sound & Vision	4/5 stars
USA Today	3/4 stars

Now received generally positive reviews from critics. At Metacritic, which assigns a normalized rating out of 100 to reviews from mainstream publications, the album received an average score of 78, based on 11 reviews. In Entertainment Weekly, Tom Sinclair found Maxwell's New Age spiritual musings to be outside the R&B mainstream and said "as mellowed-out as much of Now is, it's definitely not aural wallpaper, but a cohesive effort that rewards repeated listenings". Boston Herald critic Sarah Rodman said Maxwell had made the "truly terrific" Prince album the artist himself was no longer making while continuing to "distinguish himself from the current glut of overwrought and under- erotic r & b lotharios with his retro, almost absurdly soulful ways". Daryl Easlea from BBC Music highlighted the cover of the 1989 Kate Bush song "This Woman's Work" and deemed the album "grown-up, frequently gorgeous music that epitomises the very best in neo-soul". Greg Kot from the Chicago Tribune found Maxwell's lyrics far more straightforward than Embrya's "almost impenetrable" songs, while applauding his ability as a singer to achieve an "enlightened empathy" that "neither panders nor demands" to his fictitious lovers. James Hunter wrote in The Village Voice that Maxwell and Stuart Matthewman had avoided the gratuitous productions of Embrya in favor of more grounded music, against which the singer performed masterfully. "He is, as throughout Now, a soul singer who knows precisely what he's doing", Hunter wrote. Fellow Village Voice critic Robert Christgau gave Now an "honorable mention" in his review column, singling out "Temporary Nite", "This Woman's Work", and "Lifetime" as its best songs, while writing that Maxwell "can't outbeat D'Angelo, so he works on outsinging and outsonging him".

In a less enthusiastic review for PopMatters, Mark Anthony Neal said Now was one of 2001's "most accomplished R&B recordings", but qualified his praise by finding some of the music unadventurous and not indicative of the artistic maturity Maxwell seemed to show on Embrya. Miles Marshall Lewis was more critical in LA Weekly, believing the singer was "not Prince" and had regressed musically with Now, throughout which "the quiet storm of Maxwell's signature sound becomes damn near somnolent". Teresa Wiltz of The Washington Post said the record predictably followed his previous albums' formula of "moody musings" on romance and heartbreak, funky musical backdrops, and pleading vocals; Wiltz lamented Maxwell's inability to "stretch beyond his self-imposed limits" on record, as she believed he had "to spectacular effect" at his concerts.

== Track listing ==
All tracks are written by Hod David, Stuart Matthewman, and Maxwell (MUSZE) unless otherwise noted.

No.	Title	Writer(s)	Length
1.	"Get to Know Ya"		4:22
2.	"Lifetime"		5:29
3.	"W/As My Girl"		3:11
4.	"Changed"		4:07
5.	"NoOne"		4:41
6.	"For Lovers Only"		3:41
7.	"Temporary Nite"		4:22
8.	"Silently"		5:20
9.	"Symptom Unknown"		5:37
10.	"This Woman's Work"	Kate Bush	4:00
11.	"Now/At the Party""		5:25
Total length:			50:15

On physical copies, "Get to Know Ya" is separated into two tracks: the first four seconds on track 1, followed by the rest of the song on track 2. The album packaging simply lists the song as track 1, with "Lifetime" as track 3. On digital copies, "Get to Know Ya" is one track, as listed above.

== Personnel ==
Adapted from AllMusic.

- David A. Belgrave – marketing
- Mitchell Cohen – A&R
- Maxwell – drum programming, horn arrangements, producer (credited as "musze")
- Michael Bland – drums
- David Blumberg – harp arrangement, string arrangements
- Bruce Bouton – pedal steel
- Steve Conover – assistant engineer
- Tom Coyne – mastering
- Hod David – bass, drum programming, guitar, keyboards
- Andy Davies – engineer
- Bill Esses – engineer
- Paul J. Falcone – drum programming, engineer, Pro-Tools
- Mark Fellows – editing
- Clark Gayton – trombone
- Drew Griffiths – engineer
- Jason Groucott – assistant engineer
- Bashiri Johnson – percussion
- Eric Johnson – photography
- Tony Maserati – engineer
- Steve Mazur – engineer
- Daniel Milazzo – assistant engineer
- Michael Neal – bass
- John O'Mahoney – assistant engineer
- Flip Osman – assistant engineer
- Matt Owens – art direction
- Mike Pela – engineer, pro-Tools
- Federico Pena – keyboards
- Larry Phillabaum – engineer, pro-Tools
- Chris Ribando – engineer
- Andre Roberson – horn arrangements, saxophone
- Iain Roberton – engineer
- Tom Schick – engineer
- Etienne Stadwijk – keyboards
- Wah Wah Watson – guitar

== Chart positions ==
=== Weekly charts ===
Chart (2001)	Peak position
Australian Albums (ARIA)	32
Canadian Albums (Nielsen SoundScan)	21
Dutch Albums (Album Top 100)	27
French Albums (SNEP)	32
German Albums (Offizielle Top 100)	58
Norwegian Albums (VG-lista)	35
Swedish Albums (Sverigetopplistan)	12
Swiss Albums (Schweizer Hitparade)	64
UK Albums (OCC)	46
UK R&B Albums (OCC)	5
US Billboard 200	1
US Top R&B/Hip-Hop Albums (Billboard)	1
European Albums (Eurotipsheet)	49

=== Year-end charts ===
Chart (2001)	Position
Canadian R&B Albums (Nielsen SoundScan)	65
US Billboard 200	88
US Top R&B/Hip-Hop Albums (Billboard)	23

Chart (2002)	Position
US Billboard 200	178
US Top R&B/Hip-Hop Albums (Billboard)	47

== Certifications ==
Region	Certification	Certified units/sales
United States (RIAA)	Platinum	1,000,000^{^}
^{^} Shipments figures based on certification alone.
