= Cold (Maxwell song) =

Single by Maxwell

from the album BLACKsummers'night
- A-side: "Pretty Wings"
- Released: June 23, 2009
- Recorded: 2007
- Genre: Funk
- Length: 4:02
- Label: Columbia
- Songwriters: Musze, Hod David
- Producers: MUSZE (Maxwell); Hod David

Maxwell singles chronology
| "Bad Habits" (2009) | "Cold" (2009) | "Fistful of Tears" (2010) |

"Cold" is a song written by American R&B/soul singer Maxwell and Hod David. The song is the B-side to his number-one R&B hit single "Pretty Wings", and released from his album BLACKsummers'night. Cold was released as a single on June 23, 2009, peaking to number-one on Billboard's Hot R&B/Hip-Hop Singles Sales and number-two on Hot 100 Singles Sales.

Although "Cold" failed to chart on Billboard Hot 100, it reached #62 on Billboard's Hot R&B/Hip-Hop Songs chart in July.
