= BlackSUMMERS'night =

blackSUMMERS'night

Studio album by Maxwell
- Released: July 1, 2016
- Recorded: 2010–2016
- Genre: R&B; soul; neo soul
- Length: 46:50
- Label: Columbia
- Producer: Musze; Hod David; Stuart Matthewman

Maxwell chronology
BLACK summers' night (2009)	blackSUMMERS'night (2016)

Singles from blackSUMMERS'night
- 1. "Lake by the Ocean" Released: April 8, 2016

blackSUMMERS'night is the fifth studio album by American R&B singer and songwriter Maxwell. He produced most of the record with longtime collaborator and multi-instrumentalist Hod David; two songs were also co-produced by Stuart Matthewman. The album was released on July 1, 2016, by Columbia Records and charted at number three on the Billboard 200 while garnering widespread acclaim from critics. The album's only single, "Lake by the Ocean", won the Grammy Award for Best R&B Song.

== Background ==
blackSUMMERS'night was Maxwell's first record in seven years, following 2009's BLACKsummers'night, which was the first in a planned trilogy of albums whose names were distinguished by the capitalization of letters in one phrase of the same title. Maxwell told The Wall Street Journal in June 2016 that the trilogy is "loosely based on the concept of a night out for a woman named Black Summers". He produced most of blackSUMMERS'night with longtime collaborator Hod David.

== Release and promotion ==
blackSUMMERS'night was released by Columbia Records on July 1, 2016. In its first week of release, the album charted at number three on the Billboard 200 and sold 59,000 album-equivalent units, 57,000 of which were entire copies of the record. It became the fourth album of Maxwell's career to reach the top 10 of the chart.

To promote the album, "Lake by the Ocean" was released on April 8, 2016, as the lead single. On June 3, a lyric video for the song "1990x" was released. Maxwell also toured the United States in support of the album, performing 29 concert dates from June to August.

== Critical reception ==
Professional ratings
Aggregate scores
Source	Rating
AnyDecentMusic?	7.3/10
Metacritic	86/100
Review scores
Source	Rating
AllMusic	4.5/5 stars
Chicago Tribune	3/4 stars
Entertainment Weekly	A−
The Guardian	4/5 stars
The Irish Times	3/5 stars
Pitchfork	8.4/10
Rolling Stone	4/5 stars
Spin	8/10
Uncut	9/10
USA Today	3.5/4 stars

blackSUMMERS'night was met with widespread critical acclaim. At Metacritic, which assigns a normalized rating out of 100 to reviews from mainstream publications, the album received an average score of 86, based on 15 reviews.

Reviewing the album in the Los Angeles Times, Lorraine Ali found it charming and evocative while describing Maxwell as a "transcendent", multi-dimensional singer. Jim Farber from Entertainment Weekly said the record "exudes enough confidence to let his heart show and to let his music grow in any direction his muse demands" while offering "fresh textures to familiar soul sounds". In the opinion of Rolling Stone's Joe Levy, "the music evokes a tradition disappearing before our eyes – the spiritualized eroticism of Prince, the jazzy soul extensions of Earth, Wind and Fire – without ever being of it." In The Guardian, Dave Simpson called it "a classy comeback collection of anguished R&B".

Paul Mardles was less enthusiastic in The Observer, suggesting the record lacked memorable songs and innovative sounds; apart from funky songs such as "Lake by the Ocean", blackSUMMERS'night makes Maxwell, "in the era of Frank Ocean, look like the yesterday’s man of R&B", Madles wrote. Jim Carroll of The Irish Times also found the music relatively "old-fashioned" and wrote, "there are far too many moments here when he appears to be relying on that rich, chocolate voice to woo you rather than try something different or risky."

The album's only single, "Lake by the Ocean", won the 2017 Grammy Award for Best R&B Song.

== Track listing ==
blackSUMMERS'night track listing
No.	Title	Writer(s)	Producer(s)	Length
1.	"All the Ways Love Can Feel"	Musze, Hod David, Travis Sayles	David, Musze	5:21
2.	"The Fall"	Musze, David, Sayles, Shedrick Mitchell	David, Musze	4:11
3.	"III"	Musze, David	David, Musze	4:47
4.	"Lake by the Ocean"	Musze, David	David, Musze	3:59
5.	"Fingers Crossed"	Musze, David	David, Musze	4:38
6.	"Hostage"	Musze, David	David, Musze	3:55
7.	"1990x"	Musze, David	David, Musze	4:44
8.	"Gods"	Musze, David	David, Musze	3:35
9.	"Lost"	Musze, Stuart Matthewman	Matthewman, Musze	3:57
10.	"Of All Kind"	Musze, David	David, Musze	3:42
11.	"Listen Hear"	Musze, Matthewman	Matthewman, Musze	3:38
12.	"Night"	Earth		0:23
Total length:				46:50

== Personnel ==
Credits are adapted from AllMusic.

- Brandon Carter – cinematography
- Mark Colenburg – drums
- Tom Coyne – mastering
- Hod David – bass, drums, guitar, keyboards, piano, production, synthesizer
- Jesse Gladstone – engineering
- Robert Glasper – keyboards, piano, synthesizer
- Keyon Harrold – horn arrangements, trumpet
- Derrick Hodge – bass, keyboards, synthesizer
- Darryl "Lil Man" Howell – drums
- Eric Johnson – photography
- Stuart Matthewman – engineering, mixing, production
- Maxwell – production, vocals
- Randy Merrill – mastering
- Shedrick Mitchell – bass, keyboards, organ, piano, synthesizer
- Jermaine Parrish – drums
- Mike Pela – engineering, mixing, production
- Julian Peploe – design
- Travis Sayles – bass, drum programming, keyboards, synthesizer
- Julian Schratter – multimedia design
- Wayne Trevisani – engineering, mixing, production
- LaTina Webb – background vocals
- Kenneth Whalum III – horn arrangements, saxophone

== Charts ==
=== Weekly charts ===
Weekly chart performance for blackSUMMERS'night
Chart (2016)	Peak position
Australian Albums (ARIA)	49
Belgian Albums (Ultratop Flanders)	86
Belgian Albums (Ultratop Wallonia)	199
Canadian Albums (Billboard)	14
Dutch Albums (Album Top 100)	33
New Zealand Heatseekers Albums (RMNZ)	5
Swiss Albums (Schweizer Hitparade)	64
UK Albums (Official Charts)	72
UK R&B Albums (Official Charts)	4
US Billboard 200	3
US Top R&B/Hip-Hop Albums (Billboard)	1

=== Year-end charts ===
Year-end chart performance for blackSUMMERS'night
Chart (2016)	Position
US Billboard 200	199
US Top R&B/Hip-Hop Albums (Billboard)	18
