= Lake by the Ocean =

Single by Maxwell

from the album blackSUMMERS'night
- Released: April 7, 2016
- Recorded: 2010–15
- Genre: R&B; neo soul
- Length: 3:59
- Label: Columbia
- Songwriter(s): MUSZE, Hod David
- Producer(s): MUSZE, Hod David

Maxwell singles chronology
"Fire We Make" (2013)	"Lake by the Ocean" (2016)	"1990x" (2016)

"Lake by the Ocean" is a song recorded by American R&B singer Maxwell, for his fifth studio album, blackSUMMERS'night (2016).

Written and produced by MUSZE (Maxwell) and Hod David, the single was released April 7, 2016 by Columbia Records as the first single from the album. Maxwell debuted the song, alongside "Rose", on February 14, 2016 at the Barclays Center. "Lake by the Ocean" won the Grammy Award for Best R&B Song at the 59th Annual Grammy Awards.

== Background and composition ==
After a seven-year hiatus, including delayed release dates and cancelled tours due to a medical issue, Maxwell's first single from the second installment of his trilogy BLACKSUMMERS'NIGHT was released April 8, 2016. "Lake By the Ocean" is a song released after being described as "several years" in the making. The artist expressed, with regards to the single's delayed release, that people did not have ill feelings towards him. Additionally, Maxwell shared that the song's original composition was "much slower" and that he wanted people to know that the songs that he wrote and recorded were of his "real life", in an interview with Kevin O'Donnell for Entertainment Weekly.

== Reception ==
"Lake by the Ocean" has been reviewed positively by music critics. Ryan Reed of Rolling Stone praised Maxwell's "crooning" ability, usage of a "sweet falsetto" during the song's bridge and additionally, applauded Maxwell's layered harmonies. The same magazine named "Lake by the Ocean" one of the 30 best songs of the first half of 2016: "After a seven-year hiatus, Maxwell returned with a song that turned smooth romance and sweet nothings into a Bob Ross painting, lyrically manifesting landscapes to reflect the cleansing of a relationship. In the end, he created the year's most mature love song." Brittany Williams of The Arkansas Traveler noted that "Maxwell relishes in refined youthful aesthetics ... with punchy vocals and non-traditional phrasing". Additionally, his "straightforward, soulful vocals" were described as "the cherry and sprinkles on the eclectic sundae". Splashes of falsetto and quick pauses add that extra flavor to “Lake by the Ocean.” The single has reached number 50 on the US Hot R&B/Hip-Hop Songs chart and debuted on component charts of the US Hot R&B/Hip-Hop Songs at number 16 on the US R&B Songs chart and has peaked at number five on the US Adult R&B chart.

== Music video ==
Shot on location in Haiti, the music video for "Lake by the Ocean" was released on May 26, 2016. The music video was directed by Philip Andelman, who worked with Maxwell to visually depict a world "in need of water" where "two clandestine lovers meet with liquid dreams; one being the bare-boned need for clean water, and another, the performer, who wants to be lost in the watery worlds of love and devotion."

== Live performances ==
On May 4, 2016, in promotion of "Lake by the Ocean", Maxwell performed a live version of the single on The Late Show with Stephen Colbert. In support of the second installment of his BLACKSUMMERS’NIGHT trilogy, the artist announced a 30 date tour across North America and Asia.

== Charts ==
Chart (2016)	Peak position
US Adult R&B Songs (Billboard)	1
US Hot R&B/Hip-Hop Songs (Billboard)	50
