= Maxwell (musician) =

American R&B singer (born 1973)

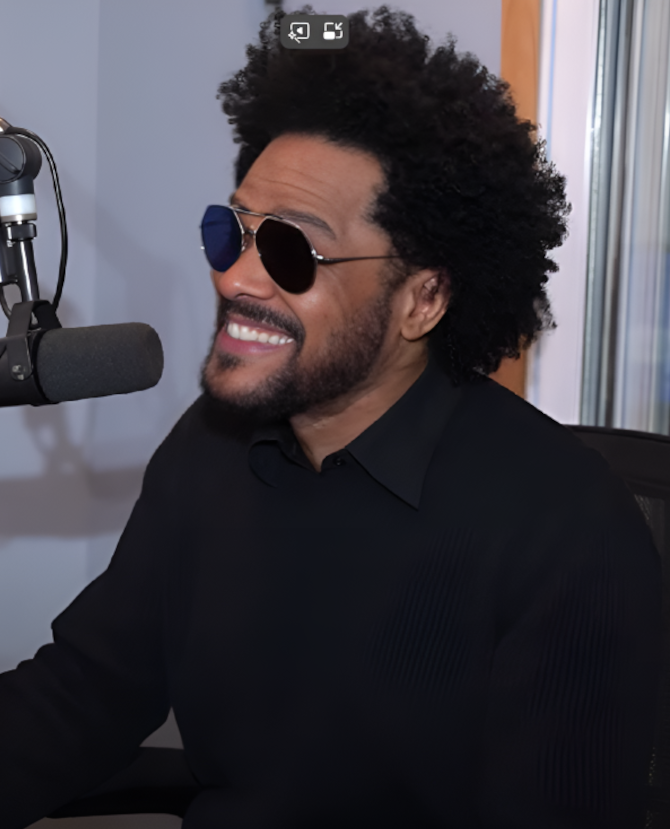
- Maxwell in 2024

Background information
- Also known as: Musze; Muze; X'Mosque; Mennard
- Born: Gerald Maxwell Rivera; May 23, 1973 (age 53); Brooklyn, New York, U.S.
- Genres: R&B; neo soul; progressive soul
- Occupations: Singer; songwriter; record producer
- Instruments: Vocals; piano; keyboards; guitar
- Years active: 1990–present
- Labels: Columbia; BMG
- Website: musze.com

Gerald Maxwell Rivera (born May 23, 1973), known mononymously as Maxwell, is an American singer-songwriter and record producer. He rose to prominence following the release of his debut studio album Maxwell's Urban Hang Suite (1996), which received widespread acclaim and spawned the hit singles "Ascension (Don't Ever Wonder)" and "Sumthin' Sumthin'". Through the album and its follow ups, Maxwell has been credited—alongside Lauryn Hill, D'Angelo, and Erykah Badu—with popularizing neo soul for mainstream audiences in the late 1990s.

His second and third albums, Embrya (1998) and Now (2001), both received platinum certifications by the Recording Industry Association of America (RIAA); the latter became his first to debut atop the Billboard 200 chart. His 1999 single, "Fortunate" was released for the R. Kelly-produced soundtrack to the film Life, and yielded his furthest commercial success as it peaked at number four on the Billboard Hot 100. After an eight-year hiatus, Maxwell returned with the release of his fourth album BLACKsummers'night (2009), which became his second to peak atop the Billboard 200 and won two Grammy Awards—Best R&B Album and Best Male R&B Vocal Performance—from six nominations; its single, "Pretty Wings" was nominated for Song of the Year. His fifth album, blackSUMMERS'night (2016), was supported by the single "Lake by the Ocean" and met with continued acclaim.

Maxwell has won three Grammy Awards, six Soul Train Music Awards and two NAACP Image Awards. He was the recipient of the Lifetime Achievement Award by the Congressional Black Caucus Foundation and Congressional Black Caucus in 2019 for "his innovative contributions to the music industry as a singer, songwriter, and producer".

== Early life ==
Maxwell was born in Brooklyn, New York, the son of a Haitian mother and a Puerto Rican father. His mother grew up in a devout Baptist household in Haiti. Maxwell's father died in a plane crash around 1976 or 1977 when Maxwell was three years old. Maxwell grew up in the Brooklyn neighborhood of East New York.

== Career ==
=== 1990–1994: Beginnings ===
After receiving a low-cost Casio keyboard from a friend, Maxwell began composing music at age 17. Already a fan of what he described as "jheri curl soul", which was the trademark of early 1980s R&B acts such as Patrice Rushen, S.O.S. Band and Rose Royce, Maxwell began to teach himself to play a variety of instruments. According to him, the R&B of the early 1980s contained "the perfect combination of computerized instrumentation with a live feel", and that the genre's dynamics later became lost due to the influence of hip hop on R&B. Despite facing ridicule from classmates for being shy and awkward, he progressed and continued to develop his musical abilities, and he also adopted the look of a more bohemian style outwardly in his clothing, growing long sideburns and letting his hair grow out wildly and combed in an extreme style, or sometimes putting his hair in long thin braids.

Initially influenced by early-1980s urban R&B, Maxwell progressed rapidly, and by 1991 he was performing on the New York City club scene. Maxwell was able to gain access to a 24-track recording studio and started to record songs for a demo tape, which he circulated among his friends. The demo engendered interest, and his official debut concert performance at Manhattan nightclub Nell's drew a crowd. During the next two years, Maxwell wrote and recorded over three hundred songs and played frequently at small venues throughout New York City. Maxwell's performances continued to draw interest and increase the buzz about him, and he was called "the next Prince" by a writer from Vibe magazine who attended one of his shows. After earning a considerable reputation, Maxwell signed a recording contract with Columbia Records in 1994. He adopted his middle name as a moniker out of respect for his family's privacy.

=== 1994–1997: Maxwell's Urban Hang Suite ===
Maxwell began working with songwriter Leon Ware and noted guitarist Wah Wah Watson to record his debut Maxwell's Urban Hang Suite in the mid-1990s. Recording sessions for the album took place in 1994 and 1995 at Electric Lady Studios, RPM Studios, Sorcerer Studios and Chung King Studios in New York City, and at CRC recording studios in Chicago, Illinois. After production for the album was completed in 1995, the finished product was presented to Columbia Records in Spring of that same year. However, it was shelved for nearly a year, due to issues with Columbia's management, the label's extensive reorganization and record executives' doubts of the album's commercial potential.

"Sumthin' Sumthin'"
The song was co-written by Leon Ware and is about a man's affection for a woman.

In 1996, waiting for the release of Urban Hang Suite, Maxwell (credited as Musze) composed and contributed lead vocals to several tracks on the eponymous debut album by Sweetback, a side project by Sade's main band members.

Initially, Maxwell, debut album was slow to obtain commercial interest. On April 20, 1996, the album made its chart debut at number 38 on the Top R&B/Hip-Hop Albums chart. From August to October 1996, Maxwell's Urban Hang Suite experienced chart growth on both the Top R&B/Hip-Hop Albums and Billboard 200, peaking at number eight on the former and at number 36 on the latter. It spent seventy-eight weeks on the Billboard 200 chart. It became a Top 30 hit in the United Kingdom. The album was later ranked as one of the year's top-10 best albums by Time, Rolling Stone and USA Today. and was also nominated for a Grammy Award for Best R&B Album at the 39th Grammy Awards, losing the award to The Tony Rich Project's Words.

The album spawned four singles. The first single released, "...Til the Cops Come Knockin'", debuted on the Hot R&B/Hip-Hop Singles & Tracks at number 87 in May 1996. Peaking at number 79, the single spent 12 weeks on the chart. The second single, "Ascension (Don't Ever Wonder)", debuted on the Hot R&B/Hip-Hop Singles & Tracks in August 1996 at number 11, eventually peaking number eight. It spent eighteen weeks on the Billboard Hot 100, peaking at number 36 on September 28, 1996. The third single, "Sumthin' Sumthin'", peaked at number 22 on the Hot Dance Music/Maxi-Singles Sales. The album's fourth single, "Suitelady (The Proposal Jam)", entered the Hot R&B/Hip-Hop Airplay component chart in May 1997, peaking at number 64. (Maxwell contributed the song "Segurança (Security)" to the AIDS-benefit album Red Hot + Rio, produced by the Red Hot Organization.)

Maxwell released a series of EPs featuring different versions of his songs from Maxwell's Urban Hang Suite, including "...Til the Cops Come Knockin'", "Ascension (Don't Ever Wonder)", "Whenever Wherever Whatever" and "Sumthin' Sumthin'". These EPs were re-released in 2019. "Sumthin' Sumthin': Mellosmoothe" appeared on the Love Jones soundtrack in March 1997.

Despite Maxwell's having released only one album, the music video television channel MTV saw his burgeoning popularity and asked him to tape an episode of the concert series MTV Unplugged in New York City. The show was taped live on June 15, 1997, and he performed his own songs as well as covers of songs by Kate Bush ("This Woman's Work") and Nine Inch Nails ("Closer"). (Maxwell clashed with his label about the release of a full album of his session, resulting in the release of only an extended play, or EP instead, containing seven songs). The MTV Unplugged performance of "...Til the Cops Come Knockin" was included as a bonus track on the international release. The episode of MTV Unplugged first aired on the network on July 22, 1997.

=== 1998–2002: Embrya and Now ===
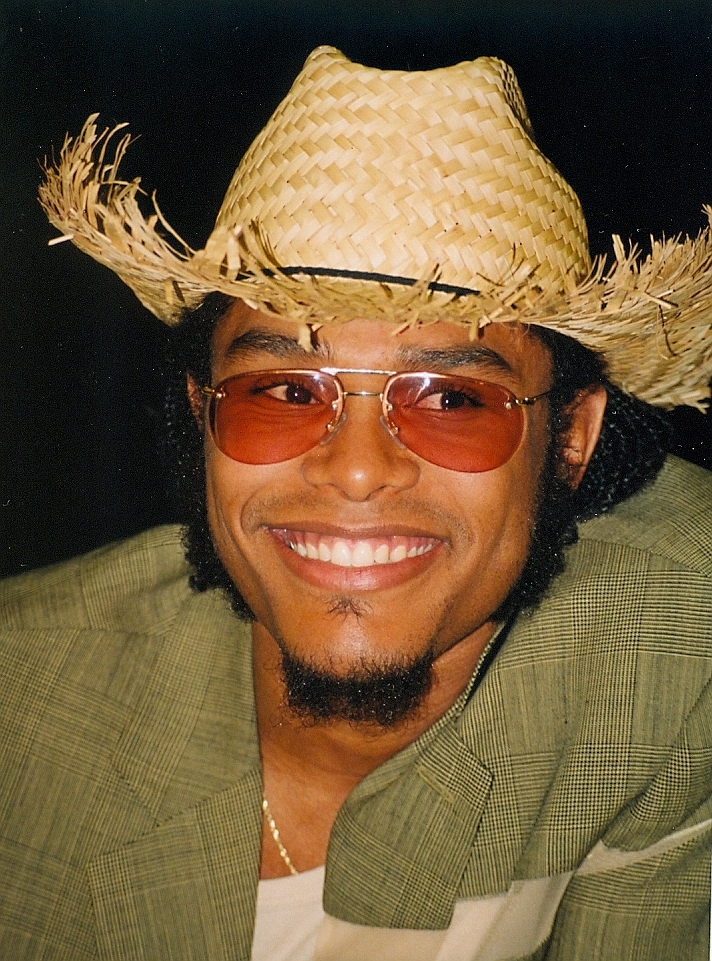
Maxwell in 1998

Maxwell's second studio album, Embrya, was released on June 30, 1998, and upon its release it was panned by contemporary music critics. The album received mixed criticism for its more "indulgent sound." With its internal focus and esoteric grooves, the album served as a departure for Maxwell, who did not regret risking his reputation with urban listeners for a more challenging record. The album experienced a critical backlash similar to that of other artists' work that broke their previous releases' successful formulas in favor of more compelling projects, now being termed "neo-soul." In 1999, it won the Soul Train Music Award for Best Male Soul/R&B Album. In a retrospective review for Allmusic, Stephen Thomas Erlewine wrote that Maxwell "overstuffs his songs with ideas that lead nowhere" and called Embrya "a bit of a sophomore stumble, albeit one with promising moments." Arion Berger, writing in The Rolling Stone Album Guide (2004), found the songs monotonous and called the album "unfocused and pretentious ... full of overwrought, underwritten songs with obscure, fancy titles revolving around a sort of sexual gnosticism." Critics have since reappraised Embrya as a groundbreaking forerunner to later trends in Alternative R&B, and Columbia Records reissued the album in 2018 on its 20th anniversary.

Despite the negative press, the album sold more than one million copies and garnered Maxwell a new alternative fanbase, but confounded the traditional urban consumers. On May 26, 1999, the album was officially certified platinum by the Recording Industry Association of America (RIAA). Embrya was nominated for a Grammy Award for Best R&B Album, losing to fellow neo-soul artist Erykah Badu's Baduizm (1997). Later in the year he released "Fortunate", a single written by R. Kelly and featured on the soundtrack for the 1999 film Life. The single peaked at number one on Billboard magazine's Hot R&B/Hip-Hop Singles and Tracks chart. To date, the song is Maxwell's most successful single and was Billboard's number-one R&B single of 1999.

Maxwell's third studio album, Now, was released by Columbia Records on August 14, 2001, in the United States. Following the lukewarm radio success of his previous album, Maxwell stated he felt more comfortable with his artistic direction in the creation of this album, which does not exhibit his previous work's conceptual style. The album sold over 296,000 units in the U.S. in the first week, according to SoundScan, to earn him his first-ever number one album. The album was later certified platinum by the RIAA. "Lifetime" was the second single from the album. It was a top five hit on Billboard's R&B/Hip-Hop songs chart and peaked at No. 22 on the Billboard Hot 100 chart. The third single off the album, "This Woman's Work", a live staple of Maxwell's, charted at number 58 on the Billboard Hot 100 and at number 16 on the Hot R&B/Hip-Hop Songs chart. Once again, despite some criticism towards Maxwell's songwriting, La Weekly stated "Now is a disappointment in the wake of 1996's Maxwell's Urban Hang Suite and its 1998 follow-up, Embrya." Now received generally positive reviews from music critics, based on an aggregate score of 78/100 from Metacritic. The album was Maxwell's last release before he took a lengthy hiatus from performing.

=== 2003–2010: BLACKsummers'night ===
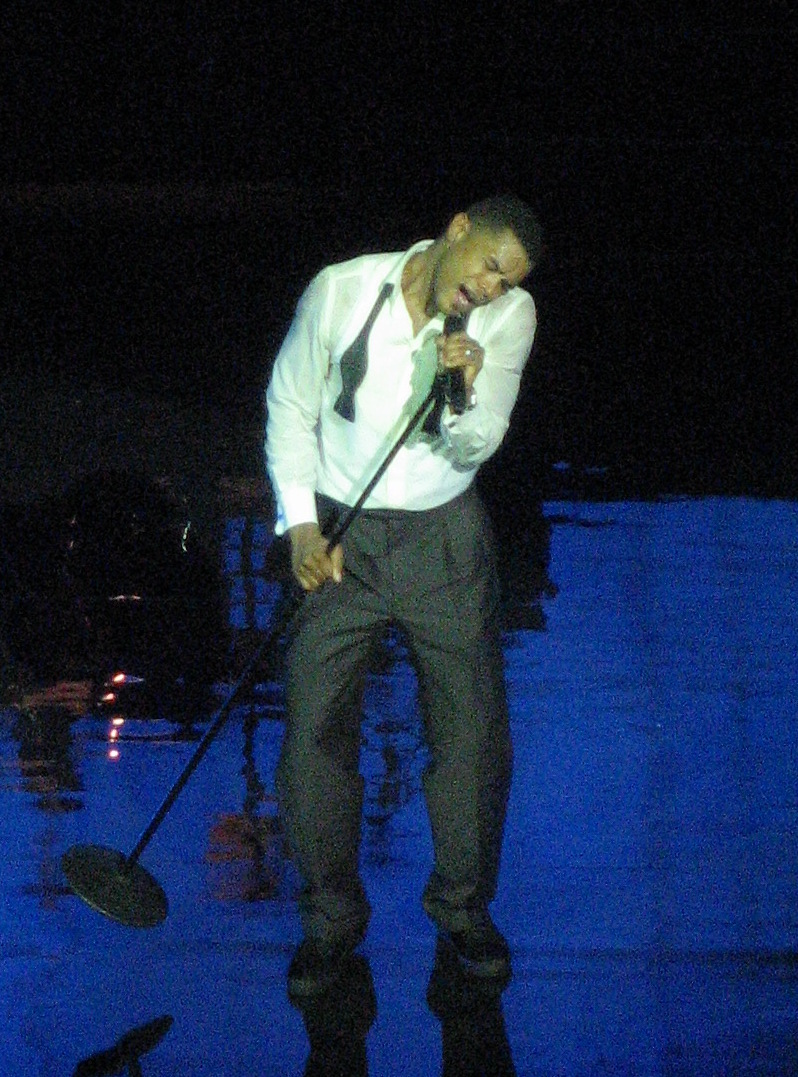
Maxwell performing in 2008

Recording sessions for a new album took place during 2007 to 2009 at Chung King Studios, Bowery Digital, and Platinum Sound Recording Studios in New York City. The album was produced entirely by Maxwell and musician Hod David. The album was to serve as the first part of his scheduled trilogy of albums.

During this time, and after seven years of not performing, he appeared as a surprise musical guest on the 2008 BET Awards, where he performed the song "Simply Beautiful" in a tribute to soul singer Al Green.

The album BLACKsummers'night was released on July 7, 2009, and received universal acclaim from music critics. Commercially the album was a success, debuting at number one on the US Billboard 200 chart in July 2009, with first-week sales of 316,000 copies, serving as Maxwell's highest first-week sales.

The album produced four singles. The lead single "Pretty Wings" debuted at number one on the US Billboard Hot R&B/Hip-Hop Songs chart, ultimately spending 47 weeks on the chart. It also spent 18 weeks and peaked at number 33 on the Hot 100 and at number 12 on its Radio Songs component chart. The second single, "Bad Habits", peaked at number four on the Hot R&B/Hip-Hop Songs, spending 46 weeks on the chart. It peaked at number 71 on the Hot 100, at number 38 on the Radio Songs chart, and at number 16 on the Hot Dance Club Songs chart. The third single "Cold" spent one week at number 62 on the Hot R&B/Hip-Hop Songs. The album's fourth single "Fistful of Tears" spent 24 weeks on the Hot R&B/Hip-Hop Songs, peaking at number 11. It charted at number 94 on the Hot 100 and at number 63 on the Radio Songs chart. Maxwell received six nominations for the 2010 Grammy Awards, winning "Best R&B Album" for BLACKsummers'night and "Best Male R&B Vocal Performance" for "Pretty Wings." "Pretty Wings" was nominated for the "Song of the Year" which was written by Maxwell under his publishing moniker Musze.

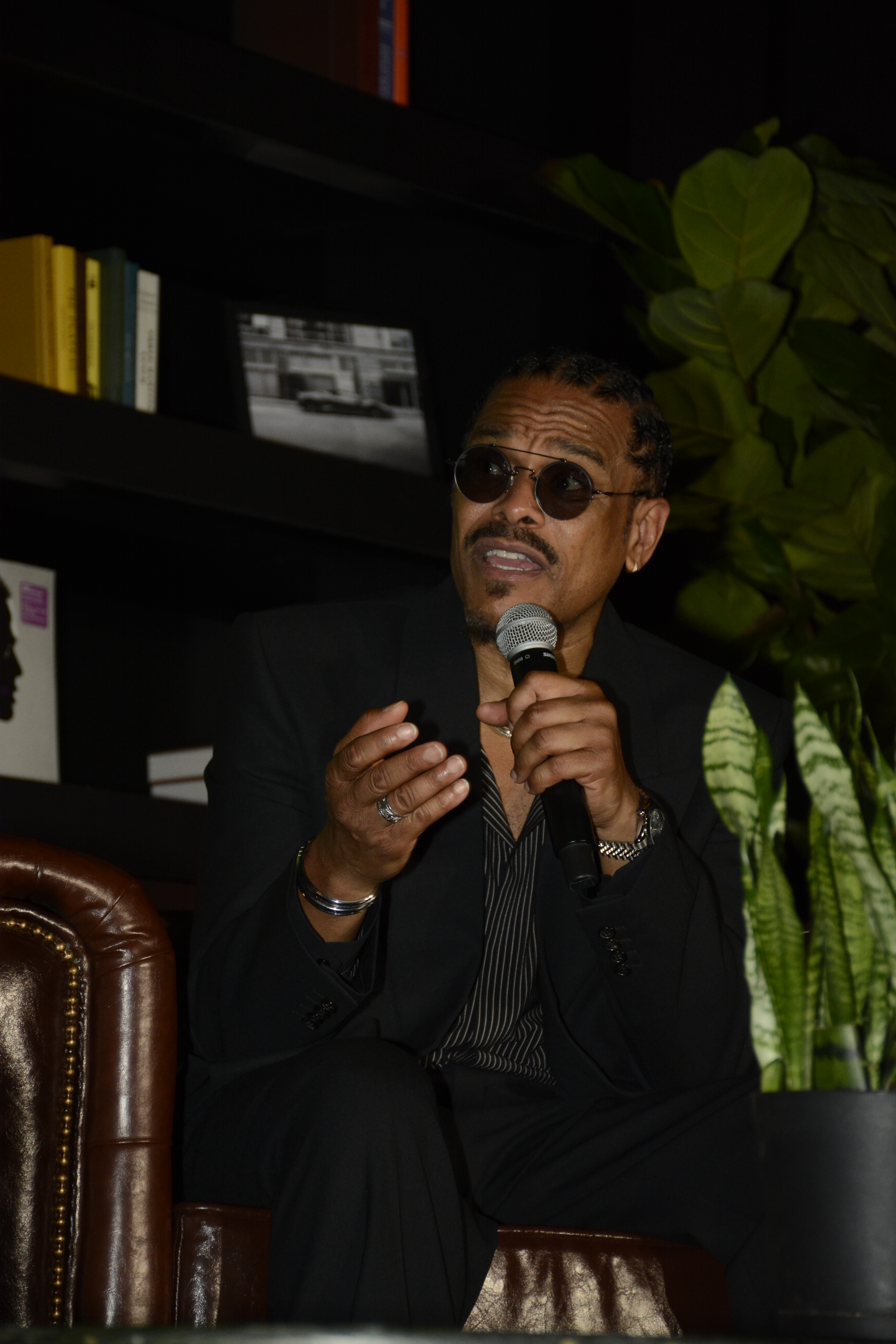
Maxwell at Essence Festival of Culture 2025

=== 2011–2017: blackSUMMERS'night ===
On April 17, 2012, Maxwell announced that he and his eleven-piece band would embark on a six-day tour, MaxwellTwoNight -M2N tour 2012 – two nights in three cities, scheduled for the cities of Los Angeles, California – Staples Center (July 20 and July 21); Atlanta, Georgia – Philips Arena (July 27 and July 28); and Newark, New Jersey – the Prudential Center (August 3 and August 4). Maxwell was to perform his discography in its entirety. The first day of the tour Maxwell was to perform songs from his first album Maxwell's Urban Hang Suite and second album Embrya. The second day of the tour Maxwell was to perform from his third and fourth albums Now and BLACKsummer'snight, respectively. Maxwell was to debut never-performed songs from his BLACKsummer'snight trilogy. lt was also announced that proceeds from the M2N tour merchandise would support the "Obama-Biden 2012" re-election campaign. However, the tour was canceled due to vocal hemorrhaging.

After two years of occasionally performing and planning, he disclosed during an interview with Rolling Stone magazine in May 2014 that he had been working on his fifth studio album for "the past three years" and has been recording in Miami. On December 18, 2014, Maxwell announced on the social media site Twitter the second installment of his trilogy blackSUMMERS'night would be arriving sometime in winter 2015.

On April 7, 2016, Maxwell released his first solo single in 6 years titled "Lake by the Ocean", and also revealed his long-awaited fifth album blackSUMMERS'night. He performed it on The Late Show with Stephen Colbert on May 5, 2016. It was his first television performance in seven years.

The full-length album was released on July 1, 2016, and charted at number three on the Billboard 200 while garnering widespread acclaim from critics.

=== 2018–present: Night ===
In October 2018, Maxwell released the single "Shame", which he said was a preview of his upcoming album Night, the final installment of his album trilogy. In April 2019 as he was re-issuing his earlier EPs in digital format, Maxwell said that he was scheduling a string of performances for mid-2019. Maxwell had a consecutive four-night concert run at the Kennedy Center, supported by the National Symphony Orchestra, in September 2019. Maxwell closed out the Hollywood Bowl's Summer Season with a 3-night run in September 2023.

== Legacy ==
Along with fellow musicians D'Angelo and Erykah Badu, Maxwell has been credited with helping to shape the "neo soul" movement that rose to prominence during the late 1990s. Along with D'Angelo's Brown Sugar (1995) and Badu's Baduizm (1997), Maxwell's Urban Hang Suite has been recognized by writers for beginning neo soul's popularity and helping the genre obtain commercial visibility. However, in contrast to D'Angelo, Maxwell was more conventional in his approach on his debut album. He inspired Canadian singer The Weeknd.

In commenting on the "new soul revival" in music, Maxwell told Entertainment Weekly in 1997 that "everything out there musically was inspired or influenced by something from the past. It's not about creating some super-fresh new thing. If it doesn't lend itself to your history, how is it going to extend to your future? That's what's really brilliant about looking into children's eyes—you can see their parents in them." The Washington Post called him "the Marvin Gaye of the '90s". Its columnist wrote that Maxwell's Urban Hang Suite "heralded the arrival of a top-of-the-class graduate of the old school of soul, one who could sing about romantic aspiration and tribulation with heart-wrenching emotion. It was as if the aesthetic that Gaye ascribed to — 'music that has feeling, hope and meaning – all the things people are looking for' — had been rediscovered after a long, hedonistic interlude."

Maxwell's role in writing and producing the album exhibited a level of artistic control by an R&B artist that was uncommon in the recording industry at the time. On his emergence with Maxwell's Urban Hang Suite, writer Carol Brennan cited him, along with the Fugees, D'Angelo and Tony Rich, as neo soul musicians that "exhibited the identifying characteristics of this new breed of R&B artists: lyrics that give voice to intense personal expression, creative control over the music, and an unexpectedly successful debut."

== Discography ==
Studio albums

- Maxwell's Urban Hang Suite (1996)
- Embrya (1998)
- Now (2001)
- BLACKsummers'night (2009)
- blackSUMMERS'night (2016)
- blacksummers'NIGHT (TBA)

== Tours ==
Headlining

- Urban Hang Suite Tour (1997)
- Now Tour (2001–2002)
- Maxwell Live (2008)
- BLACKsummers'night Tour (2009)
- Summer Soulstice (2014)
- Summers' 2016 (2016)
- The Night Tour (2022)
- The Serenade Tour (2024)

Co-headlining

- Sony Music Black College Tour with George Clinton, the Fugees, Groove Theory and UBU (1996)
- Maxwell & Jill Scott: The Tour with Jill Scott (2010)
- Annual Summer Jam with Fantasia Barrino (2016)
- King and Queen of Hearts World Tour with Mary J. Blige (2016)
- 50 Intimate Night (2018)

Cancelled tours

- MaxwellTwoNight (2012)

== Awards and nominations ==
American Music Award

Year	Nominee / work	Award	Result
2009	Maxwell	Favorite Soul/R&B Male Artist	Nominated

BET Awards

Year	Nominee / work	Award	Result
2001	Maxwell	Best Male R&B Artist	Nominated
2002	Maxwell	Best Male R&B Artist	Nominated
2010	Maxwell	Best Male R&B Artist	Nominated
2010	Maxwell	Centric Award	Nominated

Grammy Award

Year	Nominee / work	Award	Result
1997	Maxwell's Urban Hang Suite	Best R&B Album	Nominated
1998	"Whenever Wherever Whatever"	Best Male Pop Vocal Performance	Nominated
1999	"Matrimony: Maybe You"	Best Male R&B Vocal Performance	Nominated
1999	Embrya	Best R&B Album	Nominated
2000	"Fortunate"	Best Male R&B Vocal Performance	Nominated
2002	"Lifetime"	Best Male R&B Vocal Performance	Nominated
2010	"Pretty Wings"	Song of the Year	Nominated
2010	"Pretty Wings"	Best Male R&B Vocal Performance	Won
2010	"Pretty Wings"	Best R&B Song	Nominated
2010	"Love You"	Best Male Pop Vocal Performance	Nominated
2010	"Phoenix Rise"	Best Pop Instrumental Performance	Nominated
2010	BLACKsummers'night	Best R&B Album	Won
2017	"Lake by the Ocean"	Best R&B Song	Won

MTV Video Music Award

Year	Nominee / work	Award	Result
2002	"This Woman's Work"	Breakthrough Video	Nominated

NAACP Image Awards

Year	Nominee / work	Award	Result
1997	Maxwell	Outstanding New Artist	Nominated
2010	Maxwell	Outstanding Male Artist	Won
2010	"Pretty Wings"	Outstanding Music Video	Nominated
2010	"Pretty Wings"	Outstanding Song	Nominated
2010	"Bad Habits"	Outstanding Song	Nominated
2010	BLACKsummers'night	Outstanding Album	Nominated
2011	"Fistful of Tears"	Outstanding Music Video	Nominated
2011	"Fistful of Tears"	Outstanding Song	Nominated
2014	"Fire We Make"	Outstanding Duo or Group	Nominated
2014	"Fire We Make"	Outstanding Music Video	Nominated
2014	"Fire We Make"	Outstanding Song	Nominated
2017	Maxwell	Outstanding Male Artist	Won
2017	"Lake by the Ocean"	Outstanding Traditional Song	Nominated
2018	"Gods"	Outstanding Music Video	Nominated

Soul Train Music Awards

Year	Nominee / work	Award	Result
1997	Maxwell	Best New Artist	Won
1997	"Ascension (Don't Ever Wonder)"	Best R&B/Soul Single – Male	Won
1997	Maxwell's Urban Hang Suite	Best R&B/Soul Album – Male	Won
1998	MTV Unplugged	Best R&B/Soul Album – Male	Nominated
1999	Embrya	Best R&B/Soul Album – Male	Nominated
2000	"Fortunate"	Best R&B/Soul Single – Male	Won
2003	"This Woman's Work"	Best R&B/Soul Single – Male	Nominated
2009	Maxwell	Best R&B/Soul Male Artist	Won
2009	"Pretty Wings"	Best Song of the Year	Nominated
2009	"Pretty Wings"	The Ashford & Simpson Songwriter's Award	Nominated
2009	BLACKsummers'night	Best Album of the Year	Nominated
2013	"Fire We Make"	The Ashford & Simpson Songwriter's Award	Nominated
2013	"Fire We Make"	Best Collaboration	Nominated
2016	Maxwell	Best R&B/Soul Male Artist	Won

== See also ==
- Neo soul
