= Fire We Make =

Single by Alicia Keys and Maxwell

from the album Girl on Fire
- Released: March 28, 2013
- Studio: Jungle City (New York, NY); Oven (New York, NY)
- Genre: Neo soul; quiet storm
- Length: 5:21
- Label: RCA
- Songwriters: Alicia Keys; Warren "Oak" Felder; Andrew "Pop" Wansel; Gary Clark, Jr.
- Producers: Alicia Keys; Pop & Oak

Alicia Keys singles chronology
"New Day" (2013)	"Fire We Make" (2013)	"Tears Always Win" (2013)

Maxwell singles chronology
"Fistful of Tears" (2010)	"Fire We Make" (2013)	"Lake by the Ocean" (2016)

Music video
- "Fire We Make" on YouTube

"Fire We Make" is a song by American recording artists Alicia Keys and Maxwell, taken from the former's fifth studio album Girl on Fire (2012). It was written and produced by Keys along with Gary Clark, Jr. and Warren "Oak" Felder and Andrew "Pop" Wansel from production duo Pop & Oak. "Fire We Make" is a downbeat neo soul ballad with adult contemporary R&B influences, in which Keys and Maxwell adopt sensual falsetto vocals. The instrumental elements used on it include echoing electric guitar riffs and clapping synthesizers. In "Fire We Make", Keys and Maxwell, as the protagonists, confess their love and speak of the chemistry they have with each other which they compare to fire that is "getting hotter and hotter."

"Fire We Make" was well received by contemporary music critics, who noted its similarity to songs by Prince; they also praised its steamy production and the vocal performance of both singers. Released as the album's third single in the United States in March 2013, it has since reached number 29 on Billboard's Hot R&B/Hip-Hop Songs chart and number 1 on Adult R&B chart. Its music video was directed by Chris Robinson and shot in the French Quarter neighborhood New Orleans, Louisiana in April 2013. A period short film, it depicts Keys and Maxwell as a boarding house receptionist and her guest respectively. The song was part of Keys' set list during her Set the World on Fire Tour.

== Critical reception ==
Andrew Hampp of Billboard felt that it is "kindling a different kind of heat on this slow jam, a neo-soul duet with Maxwell that also features guitar work from Gary Clark Jr. Keys doesn't have many adult love-making ballads to her name, as they can often be bogged down by post-Barry White clichés or latter-period Janet Jackson TMI. But with help from Maxwell's falsetto-drenched guest verse, "Fire We Make" is worthy of its likely place on many bedroom playlists." BBC Music's Daryl Easlea found that "the beautiful, sensual" song was "all muted horns and synth bass, a textbook quiet storm. The more you hear this track, the deeper you fall in love with it." Mikael Wood of the Los Angeles Times wrote that "in the slow-burning "Fire We Make," [Keys] doubles down on the here-and-now vibe, trading breathy vocal lines with Maxwell over fuzzy soul-blues guitar by Gary Clark Jr." Stephen M. Deusner from Pitchfork Media called the song "an old-fashioned slow jam that doesn't have a whole lot of actual song to it and honestly doesn't need it. Instead, it's an excuse for vocal and sexual fireworks from two of R&B's strongest singers, with Keys' bold voice evocatively contrasting Maxwell's softer, slightly hoarse delivery." Anupa Mistry from Now dubbed "Fire We Make" the "record’s high point" and a "scorching slow jam."

Less enthusiastic, Fact's Chris Kelly wrote that the track "isn’t bad, per se, but it apes the sensuality of songs like "Diary" and "Dragon Days"." Similarly, Greg Kot of the Chicago Tribune noted that "in their between-the-sheets duet on “Fire We Make,” Keys and Maxwell take turns tossing clichés about candles, heat and moths being drawn to the flame. Gary Clark Jr. arrives with a guitar solo that throws some much needed dissonance at the sleep-walking couple, but it's too late." Somewhat critical with the album, Slant Magazine's Eric Henderson found that Keys's "flames more believably and compellingly stoked in the denouement of "Fire We Make," a sultry duet with Maxwell's ever-promiscuous falsetto warbling pillow talk." Both The Boston Globe and Rap-Up ranked the song among their favorite tracks on the album alongside "Girl on Fire,” “Tears Always Win,” and “Not Even the King”.”

== Music video ==
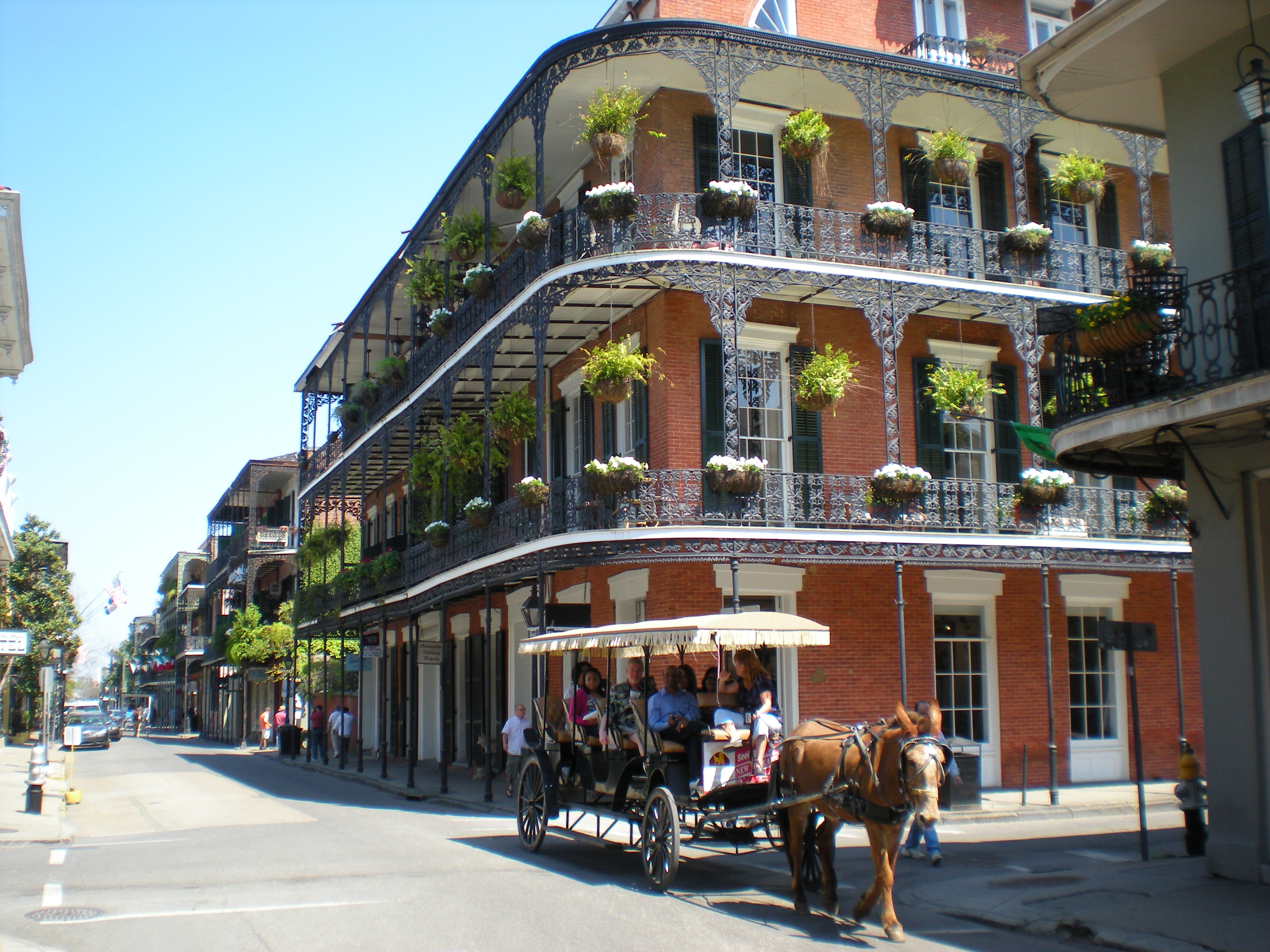
The music video for "Fire We Make" was filmed in various locations throughout the French Quarter in New Orleans.

The music video for "Fire We Make" was filmed by American director Chris Robinson in New Orleans, Louisiana in April 2013, with parts of the video shot inside a boarding house in the Garden District and the French Quarter neighborhoods respectively. It marked Keys' tenth collaboration with him. Production was helmed by Nina Miller for Robinson's Robot Films, while Bradford Young served as the video's director of photography; editing was handled by Bill Yukich. The video simultaneously premiered on BET's show 106 & Park and music video website Vevo on April 23, 2013, at 6pm.

== Credits and personnel ==
Credits adapted from the liner notes of Girl on Fire.

- David Kutch – mastering
- Ann Mincieli – audio engineering, recording
- Tony Maserati – mixing
- Pop & Oak – production

== Charts ==
=== Weekly charts ===
Chart (2013)	Peak position
South Korean International Singles (Gaon)	64
US Adult R&B Songs (Billboard)	1
US Bubbling Under Hot 100 (Billboard)	5
US Radio Songs (Billboard)	72
US Hot R&B/Hip-Hop Songs (Billboard)	38

=== Year-end charts ===
Chart (2013)	Position
US Adult R&B Songs (Billboard)	2

== Certifications ==
Region	Certification	Certified units/sales
United States (RIAA)	Gold	500,000^{‡}
^{‡} Sales+streaming figures based on certification alone.

== Release history ==
Region	Date	Format	Label
United States	March 28, 2013	Urban AC airplay	RCA Records
Italy	May 10, 2013	Mainstream airplay	Sony Music
