= Fistful of Tears =

Single by Maxwell

from the album BLACKsummers'night
- Released: January 19, 2010
- Recorded: 2008
- Genre: Soul; R&B
- Length: 3:40
- Label: Columbia
- Songwriter(s): Maxwell, Hod David
- Producer(s): MUSZE (Maxwell); Hod David

Maxwell singles chronology
"Cold" (2009)	"Fistful of Tears" (2010)	"Fire We Make" (2013)

"Fistful of Tears" is a R&B song by American recording artist Maxwell. The song is taken from his platinum album BLACKsummers'night, and reached number-eleven on Billboard's R&B/Hip-Hop Songs chart. The music video was directed by Philip Andelman.

== Charts ==
=== Weekly charts ===
Chart (2010)	Peak position
US Billboard Hot 100	94
US Adult R&B Songs (Billboard)	1
US Hot R&B/Hip-Hop Songs (Billboard)	11

=== Year-end charts ===
Chart (2010)	Position
US Adult R&B Songs (Billboard)	3
US Hot R&B/Hip-Hop Songs (Billboard)	23
