= Get to Know Ya =

Single by Maxwell

from the album Now
- Released: February 15, 2001
- Recorded: 2000
- Genre: Soul; R&B; funk
- Length: 4:22
- Label: Columbia
- Songwriter(s): Musze, Hod David; Stuart Matthewman
- Producer(s): MUSZE (Maxwell); Hod David

Maxwell singles chronology
"Let's Not Play the Game" (1999)	"Get to Know Ya" (2001)	"Lifetime" (2001)

"Get to Know Ya" is a song by American R&B singer Maxwell, released in 2001. It is the lead single from his third album Now, and peaked to No. 25 on Billboard's R&B songs chart.

== Charts ==
=== Weekly charts ===
Chart (2001)	Peak position
US Bubbling Under Hot 100 (Billboard)	1
US Hot R&B/Hip-Hop Songs (Billboard)	25
Netherlands (Single Top 100)	90

=== Year-end charts ===
Chart (2001)	Position
UK Urban (Music Week) With Lifetime	25
US Hot R&B/Hip-Hop Songs (Billboard)	97
