= This Woman's Work =

1989 single by Kate Bush

Single by Kate Bush

from the album The Sensual World
- B-side: "Be Kind to My Mistakes"; "I'm Still Waiting"
- Released: 20 November 1989
- Recorded: 1988–89
- Length: 3:33
- Label: EMI
- Songwriter: Kate Bush
- Producer: Kate Bush

Kate Bush singles chronology
"The Sensual World" (1989)	"This Woman's Work" (1989)	"Love and Anger" (1990)

Music video
- "This Woman's Work" on YouTube

"This Woman's Work" is a song written and performed by English singer-songwriter Kate Bush. It was initially featured on the soundtrack of the American film She's Having a Baby (1988). The song was released in November 1989, by EMI Records, as the second single from her sixth album, The Sensual World (1989), and peaked at No. 25 on the UK Singles Chart.

== Background ==
"This Woman's Work" is about being forced to confront an unexpected and frightening crisis during childbirth. Written for the film She's Having a Baby, director John Hughes used the song during the film's dramatic climax when Jake (Kevin Bacon) learns that the lives of his wife, Kristy (Elizabeth McGovern), and their unborn child are in danger. As the song plays, a montage sequence of flashbacks shows the couple in happier times, intercut with shots of him waiting for news of Kristy and their baby's condition. Bush wrote the song specifically for the sequence, writing from a man's (Jake's) viewpoint and matching the words to the visuals which had already been filmed.

Tarquin Gotch, who was music supervisor of She's Having a Baby, says that the temp track for the scene was This Mortal Coil's cover of "Song to the Siren" by Tim Buckley, but they were unable to obtain the rights to use the song.

The version of the song featured on The Sensual World was re-edited and re-recorded from the original version featured on the film's soundtrack. The version released as a single was listed as "Single Mix".

"This Woman's Work" is one of several songs that were re-recorded on her 2011 album Director's Cut. The new version features a sparse performance of Bush singing and playing piano.

== Composition ==
According to the sheet music published in Musicnotes.com by Sony/ATV Music Publishing, the song is set in the time signature of common time, with a slow tempo of 66 beats per minute. It is written in the key of A-flat major with Bush's vocal range spanning from A♭_{3} to E♭_{5}.

== Music video ==
The music video for "This Woman's Work", directed by Bush herself, starts with Bush, spotlighted in an otherwise black room, playing the introductory notes on a piano. In the next scene, a troubled man (played by Tim McInnerny) is pacing in the waiting room of a hospital. It is then revealed through flashbacks that his wife (played by Bush) has collapsed while they are having dinner. The story blurs into a continuous scene where he carries her to the car, a desperate race to the hospital, and his wife is wheeled away on a stretcher as he races in behind her. While waiting, the husband is wracked with fear and imagines his wife in happier times, kissing him in the rain, and even imagines the nurse coming to tell him she has died. The nurse then pulls him out of his reverie, reassuringly putting her hand on his shoulder, smiling and nodding, and telling him about his wife's situation, though we cannot hear what she is saying. The video's final scene returns to Bush as she silently covers the piano keyboard.

== Critical reception ==
Upon its release as a single, Chris Roberts of Melody Maker praised "This Woman's Work" as "a luscious, spiritually elevating ballad" which is "ecstatic with wintry tragedy" and "sort of 'The Man with the Child in His Eyes' as interpreted by Leonora Carrington". David Giles of Music Week stated, "Bush is at her most potent when she's in her reflective, late-evening mood, and her fragile, delicate voice combines with sparse piano and Michael Kamen's spot-on orchestral arrangement to create what almost amounts to a lullaby."

== Track listings ==
A version of the B-side "Be Kind to My Mistakes" had previously been featured in the film Castaway in 1986. The other B-side, "I'm Still Waiting", features on the 12" and CD single versions only.

7" single (UK)
No.	Title	Length
1.	"This Woman's Work"	3:33
2.	"Be Kind to My Mistakes"	3:03

12" and CD single (UK)
No.	Title	Length
1.	"This Woman's Work" (single mix)	3:33
2.	"Be Kind to My Mistakes"	3:03
3.	"I'm Still Waiting"	4:25

== Personnel ==
- Kate Bush – vocals, piano, keyboards
- Michael Kamen – orchestral arrangements

== Chart performance ==
"This Woman's Work" was released on 20 November 1989 and reached a peak position of number 25 on the UK Singles Chart. In 2026, "This Woman's Work" was certified platinum by the British Phonographic Industry (BPI) for sales and streams of over 600,000 units.

=== Weekly charts ===
Chart (1989/1990)	Peak position
Australian ARIA Singles Chart	89
Irish Singles Chart	20
UK Singles (OCC)	25
Europe (Eurochart Hot 100)	78

Chart (2008)	Peak position
UK Singles Chart	76
Chart (2012)	Peak position
UK Singles Chart	63
Chart (2014)	Peak position
UK Singles Chart	80
Chart (2023)	Peak position
UK Singles Downloads Chart	15
US Digital Song Sales (Billboard)	24
US Alternative Digital Song Sales	1

== Certifications ==
Region	Certification	Certified units/sales
United Kingdom (BPI)	Platinum	600,000^{‡}
^{‡} Sales+streaming figures based on certification alone.

== Maxwell's versions ==
"This Woman's Work"

Single by Maxwell

from the album Now
- Released: January 15, 2002
- Recorded: 2000–2001
- Genre: Soul; R&B
- Length: 4:01
- Label: Columbia
- Songwriter: Kate Bush
- Producers: MUSZE (Maxwell); Hod David

Maxwell singles chronology
"Lifetime" (2001)	"This Woman's Work" (2002)	"Pretty Wings" (2009)

Music video
- "This Woman's Work" on YouTube

In 1997, American R&B musician Maxwell covered the song for the release of his album MTV Unplugged. The artist later re-recorded the song in the studio for his album Now (2001). This version of the song was released as the album's third single in 2001, by Columbia Records, and peaked on the US Billboard Hot 100 chart at number 58 in 2002 and number 16 on the Billboard Hot R&B/Hip-Hop Songs chart. This version also appeared in the 2000 film Love & Basketball. Maxwell’s version charted at number 41 in the United Kingdom for the first time in 2012, following a cover version by Hope Murphy on the sixth series of Britain's Got Talent.

The song was featured on week 7 of season 5 of So You Think You Can Dance (22 July 2009). It was used as the music for a contemporary dance choreographed by Tyce Diorio and performed by contestants Melissa Sandvig and Ade Obayomi. It was featured on week 10 of season 21 of Strictly Come Dancing (25 November 2023), where it was used as the music for a contemporary dance performed by contestants Bobby Brazier and Dianne Buswell.

=== Critical reception ===
Larry Flick from Billboard magazine wrote, "Maxwell's Unplugged cover of the lilting Kate Bush chestnut is a perfect showcase for his voice—precisely because he only takes full advantage of its depth during a few impassioned moments, teasing us with his potential. The rest of the number is done in falsetto alongside minimalist treble pluckings, a style that expresses convincingly the longing implicit in the lyrics and the melody itself."

=== Music video ===
The music video for Maxwell's cover of "This Woman's Work", which was directed by Sanji, begins with pictures of Maxwell and his lover in black-and-white photography. One image reveals that his lover has died. In the next scene, Maxwell sees the ghost of his lover in the street, and proceeding toward her, he falls through the street into a watery grave, seemingly drowning in his sorrow. Maxwell then begins to swim across the street, pulling himself up by holding onto the sidewalk; he looks up to a cloud that reveals his lover's face. The next scene shows Maxwell sitting in a diner, reminiscing about the loss of his love. Sitting next to Maxwell are two women who—shown through flashbacks—have experienced heartache and loss of another kind. The music video ends with Maxwell walking outside the diner, seemingly still underwater, as he sings, "make it go away."

=== Charts ===
==== Weekly charts ====
Chart (2000–2002)	Peak position
US Billboard Hot 100	58
US Hot R&B/Hip-Hop Songs (Billboard)	16

Chart (2012)	Peak position
UK Singles Chart	41
UK R&B Chart	14

==== Year-end charts ====
Chart (2002)	Position
US Hot R&B/Hip-Hop Songs (Billboard)	72

== Hope for Isla and Jude cover versions ==
"This Woman's Work"

Single by Hope for Isla and Jude
- Released: 5 December 2014
- Recorded: 2014
- Length: 3:48
- Label: Sanfilippo Children's Foundation / Sony

In 2014, musicians Darren Hayes, Pete Murray, Marlisa Punzalan, Nathaniel Willemse and Flea from Red Hot Chili Peppers collaborated to record "This Woman's Work" as Hope for Isla and Jude produced by Alberto Quintero, and Sébastien Izambard at Koala Studios in Barcelona and Sony Music Studios in Sydney. The song was recorded to bring hope to Isla and Jude, two young Australian siblings suffering from the rare and fatal disease Sanfilippo Syndrome. Proceeds from the songs went to Sanfilippo Children's Foundation, a not-for-profit charity that dedicates its resources to progressing clinical research into the effective treatment of Mucopolysaccharidosis III, also known as MPSIII or Sanfilippo Syndrome. The song peaked at number 79 on the ARIA Singles Chart.

=== Charts ===
Chart (2014)	Peak position
Australia (ARIA Charts)	79
