= Fortunate (song) =

Single by Maxwell

from the album Life Soundtrack
- Released: March 3, 1999
- Recorded: 1998
- Genre: Neo soul
- Length: 4:59
- Label: Columbia, Rockland, Interscope
- Songwriter: Robert Kelly
- Producer: R. Kelly

Maxwell singles chronology
"Matrimony: Maybe You" (1998)	"Fortunate" (1999)	"Let's Not Play the Game" (1999)

"Fortunate" is a neo soul song from the 1999 motion picture Life and was released on the film's soundtrack. The song was written, composed, produced and arranged by R. Kelly and recorded by Maxwell. "Fortunate" was awarded Best R&B Single of the Year at the Billboard Music Award and Best R&B/Soul Single (Male) at Soul Train Music Awards. Maxwell was nominated for a Grammy for Best R&B Male Vocalist and also nominated for a Blockbuster Entertainment Awards for Favorite Song of the Year.

The song, Maxwell's biggest hit to date, spent eight weeks at number one on the US R&B chart and peaked at number four on the Billboard Hot 100. It is his first number-one R&B hit, eventually followed by "Pretty Wings" in 2009.

According to R. Kelly, Maxwell didn't want to sing "Fortunate". Instead, he wanted to sing the song "Life" - which Kelly gave to K-Ci & JoJo. Kelly rejected Maxwell's idea because he felt that the neo-soul singer wouldn't have been believable singing a song from the perspective of a prison inmate.

== Charts ==
=== Weekly charts ===
Weekly chart performance for "Fortunate"
Chart (1999)	Peak position
Australia (ARIA)	52
US Billboard Hot 100	4
US Hot R&B/Hip-Hop Songs (Billboard)	1

=== Year-end charts ===
Year-end chart performance for "Fortunate"
Chart (1999)	Position
US Billboard Hot 100	24

== Certifications ==
Certifications for "Fortunate"
Region	Certification	Certified units/sales
United States (RIAA)	Gold	800,000

== See also ==
- R&B number-one hits of 1999 (USA)
