= Lifetime (Maxwell song) =

2001 single by Maxwell

Single by Maxwell

from the album Now
- Released: October 16, 2001
- Recorded: 2001
- Genre: Soul; R&B
- Length: 5:29
- Label: Columbia
- Songwriter(s): Musze, Hod David; S. Matthewman
- Producer(s): MUSZE (Maxwell); Hod David

Maxwell singles chronology
"Get to Know Ya" (2001)	"Lifetime" (2001)	"This Woman's Work" (2002)

"Lifetime" is a song by American R&B/soul singer Maxwell, and is the second single from his third studio album Now. The song was a top five hit on Billboard's R&B/Hip-Hop songs chart and peaked at No. 22 on the Billboard Hot 100 chart.

== Charts ==
=== Weekly charts ===
Chart (2001)	Peak position
US Billboard Hot 100	22
US Hot R&B/Hip-Hop Songs (Billboard)	5

=== Year-end charts ===
Chart (2001)	Position
UK Urban (Music Week) With Get to Know Ya	25
US Hot R&B/Hip-Hop Songs (Billboard)	50
Chart (2002)	Position
US Hot R&B/Hip-Hop Songs (Billboard)	61
