= BLACKsummers'night =

Studio album by Maxwell
- Released: July 7, 2009
- Recorded: 2003–2009
- Studios: Chung King, Bowery Digital, Platinum Sound Recording (New York City, New York)
- Genres: Soul; R&B; neo soul; funk
- Length: 37:21
- Labels: Columbia; CK 89142
- Producers: MUSZE (Maxwell), Hod David

Maxwell chronology
Now (2001)	BLACKsummers'night (2009)	black SUMMERS' night (2016)

Singles from BLACKsummers'night
- 1. "Pretty Wings" Released: April 28, 2009; 2. "Bad Habits" Released: June 9, 2009; 3. "Cold" Released: June 23, 2009; 4. "Fistful of Tears" Released: January 19, 2010

BLACKsummers'night is the fourth studio album by American recording artist Maxwell, released July 7, 2009 on Columbia Records. It is the follow-up to his third album Now (2001). Recording sessions for the album took place during 2003 to 2009 and production was handled entirely by Maxwell and Hod David.

The album debuted at number one on the US Billboard 200 chart, selling 316,000 copies in its first week. It became Maxwell's fourth consecutive US Platinum album and produced four singles that achieved Billboard chart success. Upon its release, the album received acclaim from most music critics and earned Maxwell two Grammy Awards at the 52nd Grammy Awards. It has sold over one million copies in the United States.

The sequel blackSUMMERS'night was released on July 1, 2016.

== Background ==
Recording sessions for the album took place during 2007 to 2009 at Chung King Studios, Bowery Digital, and Platinum Sound Recording Studios in New York City. The album was produced entirely by Maxwell and musician Hod David. BLACKsummers'night is Maxwell's first album since his hiatus after his third album, Now (2001), and serves as the first part of his scheduled trilogy of albums.

The music of BLACKsummers'night is rooted in general soul music, and it features a more straightforward musical structure than Maxwell's previous work such as Embrya (1998). Maxwell's lyrics concern his falling in and out of love during his sabbatical period prior to the album's release. In an interview with Pete Lewis of Blues & Soul, Maxwell stated "The inspiration was real life itself. You know, while I was taking time away from the industry, I came across a relationship that took me by surprise."

== Release and promotion ==
The album was released on July 7, 2009, in multiple formats: digital, physical CD only, physical CD/DVD (Deluxe Version), and vinyl. The deluxe version includes video, entitled "5DAYSofBLACK", which discusses the development of songs and also includes the music video for "Pretty Wings".

The album produced four singles. Its lead single "Pretty Wings" debuted at number one on the US Billboard Hot R&B/Hip-Hop Songs chart, ultimately spending 47 weeks on the chart. It also spent 18 weeks and peaked at number 33 on the Hot 100 and at number 12 on its Radio Songs component chart. The album's second single, "Bad Habits", peaked at number four on the Hot R&B/Hip-Hop Songs, spending 46 weeks on the chart. It peaked at number 71 on the Hot 100, at number 38 on the Radio Songs chart, and at number 16 on the Hot Dance Club Songs chart. The third single "Cold" spent one week at number 62 on the Hot R&B/Hip-Hop Songs. The album's fourth single "Fistful of Tears" spent 24 weeks on the Hot R&B/Hip-Hop Songs, peaking at number 11. It charted at number 94 on the Hot 100 and at number 63 on the Radio Songs chart.

== Critical reception ==
Professional ratings
Aggregate scores
Source	Rating
AnyDecentMusic?	7.5/10
Metacritic	85/100
Review scores
Source	Rating
AllMusic	4.5/5 stars
Chicago Tribune	3.5/4 stars
Entertainment Weekly	B
Los Angeles Times	4/4 stars
Mojo	4/5 stars
The Observer	3/5 stars
Pitchfork	7.8/10
Rolling Stone	4/5 stars
Spin	8/10
USA Today	3.5/4 stars

BLACKsummers'night received widespread acclaim from critics. At Metacritic, which assigns a normalized rating out of 100 to reviews from mainstream publications, the album received an average score of 85, based on 15 reviews. In the Chicago Tribune, Greg Kot said it "evokes the complex late ‘70s albums of Marvin Gaye", as "Maxwell explores his vulnerabilities and idiosyncrasies, while toughening up his sound." Rolling Stone writer Jody Rosen called it "an R&B album about love, not just sex, for grown-ups who know the difference". The Village Voice's Clover Hope observed more concise and "existentialist" songwriting than on his previous work. "The constant with Maxwell is that he tackles the topic of love with a philosopher's eye", Hope wrote. "It's easy to fancy the mood of his music over its poeticism, but with BLACK, he strikes a pleasant balance that's neither boring nor overwhelming." Pitchfork critic David Drake found Maxwell "structurally ambitious" and avant-garde in his approach to musical structure, while writing that the record's best songs balance "compositional excellence, development, and tension, with carefully designed moods that reflect or complement each work's lyrical focus". Los Angeles Times writer Ann Powers found its songs' structure complementary to the album's themes, stating "the music replicates the experience of an intimate connection, its ebbs and surges, its sometimes frustrating turns". Jon Pareles of The New York Times later named it 2009's best album and found it radical in terms of contemporary R&B because of its supplicant and "elliptical" lyrics, hand-played instrumentation, fluid melodies, and "even when the rhythm gets funky, the sad, lovely songs — about a crumbling romance — are suffused with a yearning that's almost too intimate. It's soul music reinventing itself, moment to moment.

Robert Christgau was less enthusiastic, writing in MSN Music that Maxwell "really believes that the quality of the sex is measured by its curlicues—and by how long it takes to come true"; he named "Badhabits" and "Helpsomebody" as the album's highlights. The Observer's Paul Mardles was more critical, accusing Maxwell of exhibiting a "fondness for cliche". Allison Stewart from The Washington Post called the album "cerebral but impersonal" and felt that it "never quite breaks free of its self-imposed restraints". Entertainment Weekly's Leah Greenblatt said Maxwell's "sentiments rarely transcend the boudoir — and listeners lulled by the album's unvaryingly sleek, high-gloss beats may just drift off to dreamland before they get there". In the Chicago Sun-Times, Jim DeRogatis wrote that several songs "never rise above the level of pleasant background music", which he nonetheless found "gorgeously recorded, tastefully arranged and beautifully played".

BLACKsummers'night was one of 2009's most critically acclaimed music releases, being ranked near or at the top of several critics' year-end lists of best albums. It was voted the year's 14th best album in the Pazz & Jop, an annual poll of American critics nationwide, published in The Village Voice. It was also ranked seventh best by the Associated Press, ninth by Billboard, fifth by The Boston Globe's Sarah Rodman, and first by The Washington Post's Chris Richards. BLACKsummers'night also earned Maxwell 2010 Grammy Awards in the categories of Best R&B Album and Best Male R&B Vocal Performance (for "Pretty Wings"). Musician Greg Puciato named BLACKsummers'night his favorite album of 2009. In the 2020 list by Rolling Stone of the Top 500 Albums of All-Time, it was ranked number 467.

== Commercial performance ==
The album debuted at number one on the US Billboard 200 chart in July 2009, with first-week sales of 316,000 copies, serving as Maxwell's highest first-week sales. It also entered at number one on Billboard's Top R&B/Hip-Hop Albums, and at number two on the Top Digital Albums. In its second week on the Billboard 200, it fell to number two with an additional 103,000 copies sold. In its third week, the album dropped to number three with 72,000 more copies sold. In its fourth week, the album sold 55,000 more copies at number three on the chart. By August 2009, BLACKsummers'night had sold 550,000 copies, according to Nielsen SoundScan. Charting at number seven on the Billboard 200, the album sold 43,000 copies in its fifth week. It maintained its position at number seven in its sixth week, selling an additional 38,000 copies. It spent 42 weeks on both the Billboard 200 and R&B/Hip-Hop Albums charts.

In Canada, the album debuted at number 25 on the Top 100 chart, spending one week on the chart. In the United Kingdom, BLACKsummers'night entered at number 66 on the UK Albums Chart, spending one week on the chart, and at number 23 on the UK R&B Chart. On January 19, 2010, the album was certified platinum by the Recording Industry Association of America, following shipments in excess of one million copies in the United States. It serves as his fourth consecutive platinum-selling album and has sold more than one million copies in the United States. As of May 2016, it had sold 1,213,000 units in the US.

== Track listing ==
All tracks are written by MUSZE (Maxwell) and Hod David.

BLACKsummers'night track listing
No.	Title	Length
1.	"Badhabits"	5:52
2.	"Cold"	4:02
3.	"Prettywings"	5:10
4.	"Helpsomebody"	4:01
5.	"Stoptheworld"	3:56
6.	"Loveyou"	3:35
7.	"Fistfuloftears"	3:39
8.	"Playingpossum"	4:22
9.	"Phoenixrise"	2:41
Total length:		37:21

== Personnel ==
Credits for BLACKsummers'night adapted from AllMusic.

- Benedetto Nino Caccauale – engineer
- Dave Clauss – assistant
- Tom Coyne – mastering
- Chris "Daddy" Dave – drums
- Hod David – audio production, engineer, guitar, instrumentation, producer, various instruments
- Nicola Formichetti – stylist
- Jesse Gladstone – assistant, engineer
- Keyon Harrold – trumpet
- Derrick Hodge – bass, bass instrument
- Eric L. Johnson – photography
- Nicolas Klam – stylist
- Mike Makowski – assistant
- Glen Marchese – engineer, mixing
- Maxwell – primary artist
- Shedrick Mitchell – organ
- Musze – audio production, engineer, instrumentation, producer, various instruments
- Anthony Palazzole – assistant
- Mike Pela – engineer, mixing
- Federico Pena – keyboards
- Saunders Sermons – trombone
- Curtis Smith – hair stylist
- Kenneth Whalum – saxophone

== Charts ==
=== Weekly charts ===
Weekly chart performance for BLACKsummers'night
Chart (2009)	Peak position
Canadian Albums (Billboard)	25
Dutch Albums (Album Top 100)	31
French Albums (SNEP)	147
UK Albums (Official Charts)	66
UK R&B Albums (Official Charts)	5
US Billboard 200	1
US Top R&B/Hip-Hop Albums (Billboard)	1
Australian Urban Albums (ARIA)	16

=== Year-end charts ===
2009 year-end chart performance for BLACKsummers'night
Chart (2009)	Position
US Billboard 200	22
US Top R&B/Hip-Hop Albums (Billboard)	6

2010 year-end chart performance for BLACKsummers'night
Chart (2010)	Position
US Billboard 200	147
US Top R&B/Hip-Hop Albums (Billboard)	35

== Certifications ==
Certifications for BLACKsummers'night
Region	Certification	Certified units/sales
United States (RIAA)	Platinum	1,213,000
