= Bad Habits (Maxwell song) =

Single by Maxwell

from the album BLACKsummers'night
- Released: June 9, 2009
- Recorded: 2007
- Genre: Soul; R&B
- Length: 5:52
- Label: Columbia
- Songwriter(s): Musze, Hod David
- Producer(s): MUSZE (Maxwell); Hod David

Maxwell singles chronology
"Pretty Wings" (2009)	"Bad Habits" (2009)	"Cold" (2010)

"Bad Habits" is an R&B song by American R&B singer Maxwell. The song is the second single released from BLACKsummers'night and peaked at number four on Billboard's Hot R&B/Hip-Hop Songs, spending 46 weeks on the chart.

== Composition ==
Musically, "Bad Habits" is written in the key of E minor.

== Charts ==
=== Weekly charts ===
Chart (2009)	Peak position
US Billboard Hot 100	71
US Adult R&B Songs (Billboard)	1
US Hot R&B/Hip-Hop Songs (Billboard)	4
US R&B/Hip-Hop Airplay (Billboard)	4

=== Year-end charts ===
Chart (2009)	Position
US Hot R&B/Hip-Hop Songs (Billboard)	49
Chart (2010)	Position
US Adult R&B Songs (Billboard)	16
