= Pretty Wings =

Single by Maxwell

from the album BLACKsummers'night
- B-side: "Cold"
- Released: April 28, 2009
- Recorded: 2008
- Genre: R&B
- Length: 5:09
- Label: Columbia
- Songwriter(s): Maxwell, Hod David Marcus Hill
- Producer(s): Maxwell, Hod David

Maxwell singles chronology
"This Woman's Work" (2002)	"Pretty Wings" (2009)	"Bad Habits" (2009)

"Pretty Wings" is a single by American singer-songwriter Maxwell, taken from his fourth studio album BLACKsummers'night. It was written and produced by Maxwell and Hod David.

The song won the Grammy Award for Best Male R&B Vocal Performance and was nominated at the 52nd Grammy Awards for Song of the Year and Best R&B Song.

== Background ==
Maxwell described "Pretty Wings" to MTV as "a bittersweet love song about meeting the right girl at the wrong time". The single is his first in seven years (previous single being the cover of Kate Bush's "This Woman's Work" in 2002). On further details of the song, Maxwell also told Billboard Magazine: "I met this girl who I still respect very much, and although it didn't work out, I got lots of inspiration from it. This track speaks of my time with her. " Glockenspiels are heard in the intro of the composition. Despite the drifty meditation music being audible while the horns, drums, cymbals, hi-hats, and synthesized claps play and Maxwell sings, the song contains a long, meditation music-like outro with horns blowing softly at the end.

The lyrics of the song express "pretty wings" as a metaphor; "If I can't have you, let love set you free to fly your pretty wings around."

== Music video ==
The Philip Andelman-directed music video premiered on 106 & Park on April 28, 2009. As of August 2025, the video has been viewed on YouTube over 96 million times. The music video takes place in a dim household and some scenes of the video shows five separate women in their beds sleeping. Maxwell served as an Incubus who is in bed with the women in their own scenes. In the final minutes of the video the women all levitate above their beds after reaching a state of euphoria by the Incubus. The final shot is Maxwell leaving one of the bedrooms of one of the five women. The music video was also ranked at #9 on BET's Notarized: Top 100 Videos of 2009 countdown.

== Chart performance ==
"Pretty Wings" reached the top forty on the Billboard Hot 100. It also topped the Hot R&B/Hip-Hop Songs chart, making it Maxwell's first song in ten years to have done so (the last having been "Fortunate" in 1999). It remained at number one on that chart for fourteen consecutive weeks, which remains tied for the third-longest run at the top in the chart's history.

=== Weekly charts ===
Chart (2009)	Peak position
Japan (Japan Hot 100)	85
US Billboard Hot 100	33
US Adult R&B Songs (Billboard)	1
US Hot R&B/Hip-Hop Songs (Billboard)	1

=== Year-end charts ===
Chart (2009)	Position
US Billboard Hot 100	99
US Billboard Hot R&B/Hip-Hop Songs	2

== Certifications ==
Region	Certification	Certified units/sales
United States (RIAA)	Gold	500,000^{*}
United States (RIAA) Mastertone	Gold	500,000^{*}
^{*} Sales figures based on certification alone.
