= Focal character =

Character meant to be the audience's focus

In any narrative, the focal character is the character on whom the audience is meant to place the majority of their interest and attention. They are almost always also the protagonist of the story; however, in cases where the "focal character" and "protagonist" are separate, the focal character's emotions and ambitions are not meant to be empathized with by the audience to as high an extent as the protagonist (this is the main difference between the two character terms). The focal character is mostly created to simply be the "excitement" of the story, though not necessarily the main character about whom the audience is emotionally concerned. The focal character is, more than anyone else, "the person on whom the spotlight focuses; the center of attention; the man whose reactions dominate the screen."

For example, in Gaston Leroux's The Phantom of the Opera, the protagonist is Christine Daaé (the audience is concerned mostly with her emotions, aims, and well-being), while the focal character is the "Phantom" (the audience is concerned mostly with the allure of his actions and reactions—though to some degree, later on, his emotions as well).

The focal character is also not necessarily the same thing as the viewpoint character, through whose perspective the story is seen. In Sir Arthur Conan Doyle's works of Sherlock Holmes, Watson is the viewpoint character, but the story revolves around Holmes, making him the focal character. In the novel The Great Gatsby by F. Scott Fitzgerald, Nick Carraway is the first-person narrator and protagonist, but his wealthy neighbor Jay Gatsby is the center of the novel's attention, suspense, and intrigue.

== Example works where the focal character and protagonist are distinct ==
Film / Series	Protagonist	Focal character	Information
El Chavo del Ocho	Chavo	Don Ramón	Don Ramón was the common thread that united all the characters of the neighborhood. Carlos Villagrán argument and mention: "If we take away Don Ramón, La Chilindrina is left without a father, no one pinches Quico, Doña Florinda is left with no one to hit. The Witch of '71, her reason for living in the neighborhood was Don Ramón. For Mr. Barriga, the only one who didn't pay the rent was him and El Chavo is left without a protector."
Heroes	Peter Petrelli	Claire Bennet	Claire is the driving force of the series; the whole plot starts with the prophecy 'Save the cheerleader, save the world.' Claire is that cheerleader who, without knowing it, is at the center of everything, and her existence forces the other characters to act and interact with her storylines.
Pretty Little Liars	Spencer Hastings	Alison DiLaurentis	Alison is the one who starts the plot of the series. His mysterious disappearance in the first episode of the series sets the tone of intrigue and suspense that drives the plot, so his presence and story are central to the series, keeping viewers hooked as secrets are unraveled and mysteries are solved.
13 Reasons Why	Clay Jensen	Hannah Baker	Hannah is the one who commits suicide, and her tapes are the narrative engine that drives the whole plot. She sets the pace of the story, acts as the story's conscience, and connects the characters and the plots.
Riverdale (American TV series)	Archie Andrews	Betty Cooper	Betty is the character who is always involved in the main plots and mysteries of each season, and even as the series progresses, her family becomes the central focus of the show. Even the series finale features her as the last living character and leaves us with the feeling that Betty has always been the true protagonist of the series.
