= Thirteen Reasons Why =

2007 novel by Jay Asher

- Cover
- Author: Jay Asher
- Audio read by: Debra Wiseman and Joel Johnstone
- Cover artist: Christian Fuenfhausen
- Language: English
- Genre: Young adult Tragedy
- Publisher: RazorBill
- Publication date: October 18, 2007
- Publication place: United States of America
- Media type: Print (hardback)
- Pages: 288
- ISBN: 978-1-59514-188-0
- OCLC: 85622684
- LC Class: PZ7.A8155 Th 2008

Thirteen Reasons Why (also stylized as TH1RTEEN R3ASONS WHY) is a young adult novel written by Jay Asher in 2007, which follows the story of Hannah Baker, a high school sophomore, and the thirteen reasons why she killed herself. Following her death, Hannah leaves behind a series of seven double-sided cassette tapes detailing the thirteen specific people and events that she blames for her demise. Two weeks after her death, these cassette tapes are mailed out with directions to pass the tapes on to the next person on the tape. Hannah's life story is conveyed through these tapes, which are narrated by Hannah herself, and through the point of view of Clay Jensen, her classmate and the ninth person to receive the tapes. The inspiration behind the main character, Hannah Baker, comes from author Jay Asher's close relative who attempted suicide.

Since the novel's publication in 2007, Thirteen Reasons Why has received much recognition. As of 2014, Thirteen Reasons Why had been a New York Times bestseller for over three years and published in multiple countries. The novel's success has also been met with backlash, becoming the third-most banned book in the United States between 2010 and 2019. Additionally, in March 2017, a Netflix original series based on the book was released.

== Introduction ==
Jay Asher's career as a children's author started in his first year of college when he wrote and published three children's books. Although none of his children's books sold over the course of nine years, he continued to write. Asher continued to write children's books while he simultaneously started the three-year process of writing Thirteen Reasons Why — Asher's first entrance into teen literature. After facing twelve rejections, Thirteen Reasons Why was finally accepted and published on his thirteenth attempt. The inspiration behind Hannah Baker's story came from a family member of a similar age who attempted suicide. After hearing her story of how she saw suicide as the only escape from her pain, Asher was deeply affected. To ensure he fully captured the emotions of the story's main character, Hannah Baker, he gathered information from women about their high school experiences. After travelling to Las Vegas and attending an audio tour, he found the structure that he wanted his novel to be told through — cassette tapes. Asher wants readers to understand that it was a conscious decision not to make any mention of mental health issues, as his story is more about how we treat people.

== Publication ==
The novel was published in trade paperback format by Penguin Young Readers Group, a division of Penguin Random House, on June 14, 2011. Thirteen Reasons Why had remained in hardcover long past the usual one-year release-to-paperback schedule due to its continued grassroots popularity and sales fueled by author participation.

On December 27, 2016, the Tenth Anniversary Edition of Thirteen Reasons Why was published in hardcover, also by Penguin Young Readers Group. This edition includes new content including, but not limited to, the author's original unpublished ending for the book, a new introduction, an essay from the author, and pages from the notebook that the author used while writing this novel.

== Characters ==
Hannah Baker
The subject of the novel. She is a seventeen-year-old, high school sophomore who is sexually abused and harassed, which leads to her taking her own life and leaving behind seven double-sided cassette tapes. These tapes reveal the thirteen people and events during the course of a freshman-sophomore year that lead to her suicide.
Clay Jensen
The narrator of the novel. He is the subject of the ninth tape, on which Hannah clarifies that he was always kind to her; aside from his developing feelings and the duo sharing a kiss, she says that he does not deserve to be on her list. Clay is the only person on the tapes who is not directly blamed as a reason for Hannah's death.
Justin Foley
The subject of the first and tenth tapes. A year older than Hannah, he is her first crush and first kiss. Hannah blames Justin on the first tape for starting rumors that she is a slut, and she blames him for allowing Bryce to rape Jessica.
Alex Standall
The subject of the second tape. After breaking up with Jessica, he publishes a "hot or not" list, giving Hannah the title, "Best Ass in the Freshman Class." Hannah believes this title further reinforces her reputation as a slut after her kiss with Justin.
Jessica Davis
The subject of the third tape and a friend of Hannah's before Alex's "hot or not" list ends their friendship. Hannah blames Jessica for believing the rumors about her and telling people that Hannah stole Alex from Jessica.
Tyler Down
The subject of the fourth tape. A classmate of Hannah's who worked as a photographer for the yearbook. Tyler stalked Hannah and took pictures of her through her bedroom window.
Courtney Crimsen
The subject of the fifth tape and an acquaintance of Hannah's. After helping Hannah catch Tyler, Courtney spreads rumors about finding sexual "toys" in Hannah's bedroom, further smearing Hannah's reputation.
Marcus Cooley
The subject of the sixth tape. He once goes on a date with Hannah after matching with her through a Valentine's fundraiser. At a diner, he tries to take advantage of her and calls her a "tease" when she rejects him.
Zach Dempsey
The subject of the seventh tape. After trying to comfort Hannah following her confrontation with Marcus, he turns on Hannah when she rejects him. In a shared class, Zach takes Hannah's "notes of encouragement" so that she no longer receives the anonymous support the class previously gave her.
Ryan Shaver
The subject of the eighth tape; he was briefly friends with Hannah when the two attended an out-of-school poetry class. After gaining her trust, Ryan steals and publishes one of Hannah's poems in the school newspaper. Despite the anonymous submission, Hannah is humiliated.
Jenny Kurtz
The subject of the eleventh tape and a cheerleader who offers to take Hannah home from her first party. She comforts Hannah, but after she hits a stop sign and fails to tell the police, Hannah blames her for causing a car accident that later kills another classmate.
Bryce Walker
The subject of the twelfth tape. At the first party Hannah attends, Bryce rapes an unconscious Jessica. Later, he invites Hannah into a hot tub at another party and sexually assaults her. Hannah resists but it is futile, so she lets herself go in despair.
Mr. Porter
The subject of the thirteenth tape and the final person slotted to receive Hannah's reasons. He is the school counsellor who leads on to Hannah admitting that she was sexually abused, but Porter explains to Hannah that her choices are to confront Bryce or that she should "let it go" and move on. Hannah, unhappy with these choices, gains enough clarity to kill herself.
Tony
A high school student who, though he is not on any of the tapes, receives copies of them just before Hannah's death. Though he tries to warn Hannah's parents, she kills herself, leaving Tony to watch over the people who are named as reasons for her death.
Skye Miller
A female high school student and former friend of Clay's who is not named on any of the tapes. Clay suspects she is suicidal and reaches out to her at the end of the novel.

== Plot ==
High school student Clay Jensen receives a mysterious package in the mail with seven cassette tapes recorded by Hannah Baker, a classmate who has recently died by suicide. The tapes have also been sent to several other classmates, instructing each of them to visit each person mentioned and to pass them on to the person following them on the tapes. As he listens to the cassettes, Clay learns that there is a side of the tapes for each person to whom Hannah attributes her reasons for her suicide. After sending the tapes to the next person, Clay returns to school and runs into his classmate Skye Miller, whom he suspects is also suicidal. The novel ends with Clay reaching out to Skye.

== Reception ==
Since its release, the novel has received both praise and criticism. Despite the mixed critical reviews, the novel became a bestseller after its release, holding a spot at number 16 on USA Today's list of Top 100 Books of 2017 after the release of the Netflix adaptation earlier that year. While the show's popularity increased interest in the novel, its notoriety among suicide prevention groups drew criticism of the novel's premise. After the show's release, school psychologists criticized the novel's premise for failing to address mental illness and making Hannah's death seem like the result of "stressors or coping challenges."

Due to its depictions of sexual assault in particular, another question about the novel is whether it should be given a warning label to alert readers of the content. Alev Scott, a writer from The Financial Times, argues that adding a precaution at the beginning of the piece could create a negative mindset that readers will carry with them into the reading, even if they might not initially have had this mindset. Nevertheless, especially after the release of the Netflix show, critics are revisiting the novel to question whether it glorifies suicide.

Ali Jan Maqsood, a writer at the DELTA school, suggests that this is a book all young adults should read to inform them about how life events can create negative thoughts, which can then lead to cynical views about one's life.

=== Censorship in the United States ===
Thirteen Reasons Why has frequently been challenged and removed from schools and libraries, according to the American Library Association. The book landed on the ALA's Top 10 Most Challenged Books lists in 2012, 2017, and 2018. Ultimately, it became the third-most challenged book between 2010 and 2019. The book has been challenged because it addresses teen suicide, is sexually explicit, includes drugs, alcohol, and smoking, and is considered unsuitable for the age group.

In May 2017, the curriculum director in Mesa County School District in Colorado ordered librarians to stop circulating the book due to a rash of student suicides. After three hours of deliberation by librarians and counselors, the books were returned to circulation when it was determined that the book was not as graphic as the TV series. Notices were sent to parents within the school district alerting them to the possible influence of the series.

As of 2024, the book has been banned at schools in Florida, Michigan, North Carolina, South Carolina, Utah, Texas, North Dakota, and Pennsylvania.

=== Awards ===
- 2013 – Abraham Lincoln Award winner
- 2010 – South Carolina Young Adult Book Award winner
- 2009 – International Reading Association Young Adults' Choice list
- 2009 – Writing Conference's Literature Festival
- 2008 – Best Books for Young Adults YALSA
- 2008 – Quick Picks for Reluctant Young Adult Readers YALSA
- 2008 – Selected Audiobooks for Young Adults YALSA
- 2008 – California Book Award silver medal – Young Adult

== Analysis ==
Another concern of critics is how the novel's subjects of bullying and suicide impact young adult readers. Despite its controversial subject matter, Festus High is one example of a school that supports the novel. Principal Diana Allen said, "If we don't talk about it, we're hiding from it," and shared that she wants students to have conversations about the book and be aware that counselors are there to support them. Further, educators James Chisholm and Brandie Trent argue that incorporating the novel into school curricula can not only increase students' reading comprehension and analytic skills, but also their ability to apply the themes of the novel in their own lives as well. Other proponents of teaching the novel claim that its use in school anti-bullying efforts benefits young adult readers who are close in age to the characters. The author encourages high schools to adopt the novel as a means of starting conversations on bullying. More generally, the novel has been hailed by adults outside the classroom as being a supplement to local initiatives in starting the conversation between parents and their children about suicide.

== Adaptations ==
On October 29, 2015, Netflix announced that it would be making a television adaptation of the book with Selena Gomez in the role of an executive producer instead of the main character. Tom McCarthy was hired to direct the first two episodes. The series is produced by Anonymous Content and Paramount Television, with Gomez, McCarthy, Joy Gorman, Michael Sugar, Steve Golin, Mandy Teefey, and Kristel Laiblin serving as executive producers. Katherine Langford replaced Gomez for the role of Hannah Baker but left after two seasons. The series has four seasons extending the original plot from the novel.

=== Differences with the television series ===
- In the book, Clay listens to all of Hannah's tapes in one night; in the television series, he listens to them over the course of several days.
- In the book, it is revealed that Hannah dies by suicide via swallowing a handful of pills. However, in the television series, there is a scene of Hannah cutting her wrists. Two years after the show's release, the graphic scene of her suicide was cut out.
- In the book, Hannah's parents own a shoe store. However, in the TV show, they own a drugstore.
- The book features Clay and Hannah as the primary narrators of the book, while the series is told from multiple perspectives in order to present in-depth details of each character.
- In the book, there is no mention of Hannah's parents bringing forth a lawsuit, while in the series the school is on the receiving end of the lawsuit.
- In the book, the name of the girl on the 11th tape is Jenny Kurtz, but in the show her name is Sheri Holland.
- In the book, Bryce Walker and Monty De La Cruz do not die.
- The sequence of persons on tape is also changed:

In the book: Justin Foley, Alex Standall, Jessica Davis, Tyler Down, Courtney Crimsen, Marcus Cooley, Zach Dempsey, Ryan Shaver, Clay Jensen, Justin Foley, Jenny Kurtz, Bryce Walker, Mr. Porter.
In the TV series: Justin Foley, Jessica Davis, Alex Standall, Tyler Down, Courtney Crimsen, Marcus Cole, Zach Dempsey, Ryan Shaver, Justin Foley, Sheri Holland, Clay Jensen, Bryce Walker, Mr. Porter.
