= The Future of Us =

2011 novel by Jay Asher and Carolyn Mackler

- First Hardcover Edition Cover
- Authors: Jay Asher; Carolyn Mackler
- Language: English
- Publisher: Razorbill
- Publication date: November 21, 2011
- Publication place: United States
- Media type: Print (hardback)
- Pages: 356
- ISBN: 978-1-59514-491-1

The Future of Us is a 2011 contemporary fiction novel written by Jay Asher and Carolyn Mackler. The novel was published on November 21, 2011 by Razorbill, a division of Penguins Young Readers Group.

== Plot ==
Josh and Emma are about to discover themselves—fifteen years in the future.

In 1996, Josh and Emma are neighbors and longtime friends. Following events the previous November, their relationship became strained. When Josh's family receives an AOL CD-ROM, his mother has him bring it to Emma to install on her computer. Upon logging on, they access Facebook profiles displaying their lives fifteen years in the future, including their spouses, careers, homes, and status updates. Each time they refresh the page, their future information updates. As they observe their future outcomes, they reevaluate their actions in the present.

They end up discovering that they have feelings for each other and end up dating each other.

== Characters ==
- Josh Templeton is a friendly, somewhat awkward redheaded kid.
- Emma Nelson is a friendly, more social character.
- Graham Wilde is Emma's boyfriend who she tries to breakup with in the beginning of the story.
- Tyson is Josh best friend and is dating Kellan.
- Kellan is Emma's friend and is dating Tyson.

== Reception ==
The novel has received mixed to positive reviews. The film option rights for the movie version of the book has been sold to Warner Bros.
