= Jay Asher =

American writer

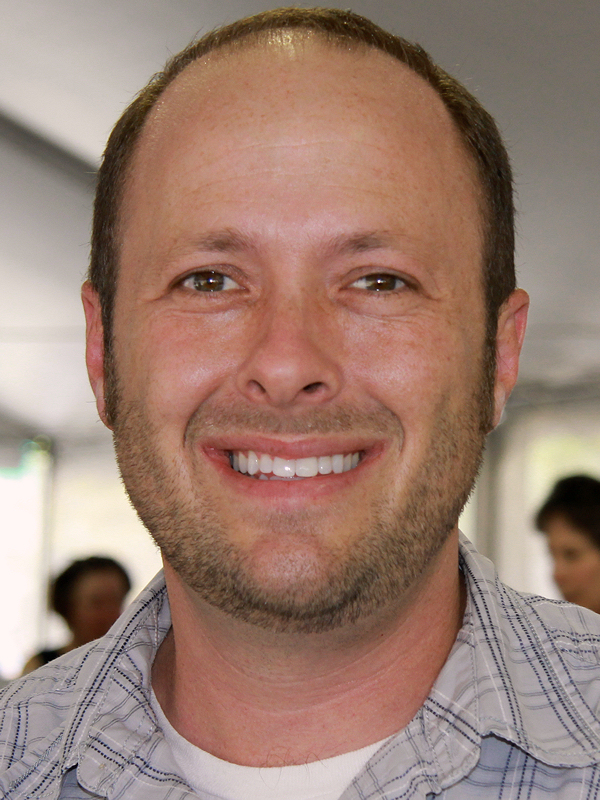
- Asher at the 2011 Texas Book Festival
- Born: September 30, 1975 (age 51); Arcadia, California, U.S.
- Occupation: Author
- Spouse: Joan Marie (m. 2002 – div. c. 2018)
- Children: 1
- Writing career
- Years active: 2007–present
- Genre: Young adult
- Notable work: Thirteen Reasons Why (2007)
- Website: jayasher.blogspot.com

Jay Asher (born September 30, 1975) is an American writer and novelist. He is best known for writing the bestselling 2007 book Thirteen Reasons Why, which later became a Netflix series.

== Early life ==
Asher was born in Arcadia, California, on September 30, 1975. He is half Jewish. He attended Cuesta Community College and later California Polytechnic State University in San Luis Obispo, before leaving during his junior year to pursue his career as a writer. Asher spent years trying to kick-start a career writing children's picture books. During this time, Asher worked at a shoe store, a trophy shop, libraries, and bookstores.

== Career ==
Asher has published four books: Thirteen Reasons Why, a 2007 New York Times best-selling young-adult fiction novel; The Future of Us, co-written by Carolyn Mackler; What Light; and Piper. Asher has also written several picture books and middle school humor novels. Thirteen Reasons Why won several awards and received five stars from Teen Book Review. It also received high praise from Ellen Hopkins, Sherman Alexie, Chris Crutcher, and Gordon Korman.

Asher's novel, Thirteen Reasons Why, was considered for a film treatment with Selena Gomez starring. Netflix released a series based on the novel on March 31, 2017, with Gomez serving as executive producer.

=== Sexual misconduct allegations ===
In April 2017, the Society of Children's Book Writers and Illustrators and Asher's agent received an email signed anonymously by seven female members of the society accusing Asher of using conferences to lure women into sexual affairs and that he threatened them to keep quiet. Asher, who is married, admitted to engaging in multiple affairs with members of the society and agreed to no longer attend the conferences in any capacity.

In February 2018, the society announced that it had expelled and cut ties with Asher in 2017 following allegations of sexual harassment. Asher disputed that he was expelled stating that he left voluntarily, and filed a lawsuit against the society for defamation. Prior to the lawsuit the allegations were not publicly reported in the press. Asher maintains that the affairs were consensual and that he has been a target of harassment for a decade. Asher has not revealed the names of his accusers, stating that he has no intention in doing so. The lawsuit was eventually dismissed, although The Free Press reported that correspondence by the society's lawyer referred to Asher's exit as "voluntary".

On February 13, 2018, a spokesperson for Netflix confirmed to BuzzFeed News that Asher did not play a creative role in the further seasons of the series.

In January 2026, in an article in The Free Press by Kat Rosenfield, a columnist for UnHerd and Reason, Asher denied the sexual misconduct allegations. According to the article, the individual who had written the email had been engaged in an extramarital affair with Asher in 2005, and began cyberstalking and harassing him after the affair ended. According to Asher, the affair ended after he told her she was not the only woman he was being unfaithful with. The article also claims that one of the other seven signatories had felt uncomfortable with the insinuations made in the email against Asher, saying that the affairs he had engaged in were all consensual, and that the individual who had written the email had done so out of jealousy.

== Personal life ==
Asher married Joan Marie on September 7, 2002. Asher lives in California.

== Published works ==
=== Young adult novels ===
- Thirteen Reasons Why (2007)
  This is the story of Hannah Baker, a girl who dies by suicide. She reveals her thirteen reasons for her decision in a series of several audio tapes mailed to a classmate with instructions to pass them from one student to another, in the style of a chain letter. Through Hannah's recorded voice, her classmates learn the reasons why Hannah decides to take her own life. Besides Hannah, the reader also sees the story through the eyes of Clay Jensen, one of the recipients of the tapes.
- The Future of Us (2011), co-written with Carolyn Mackler
  This is the story of Josh and Emma, two teenagers who used to be best friends until a huge misunderstanding. In 1996, Josh helps Emma set up her internet, only to find Facebook – before it has been invented. There, they can see themselves 15 years in the future - status updates, information, friends, etc. Using Facebook, they are able to change their destinies.
- What Light (2016)
  Sierra's family runs a Christmas tree farm in Oregon – it's an idyllic place for a girl to grow up, except that every year they have to pack up and move to California to set up their Christmas tree lot for the season. So Sierra lives two lives: her life in Oregon and her life at Christmas. And leaving one always means missing the other. Until this particular Christmas, when Sierra meets Caleb, and one life begins to eclipse the other.

=== Comics ===
- Piper (2017), a graphic novel co-written with Jessica Freeburg and illustrated by Jeff Stokely

=== Non-fiction ===
- Sunny Boy: More Than a Family Story (2017), memoirs

== Adaptations ==
- 13 Reasons Why (2017–2020), series developed by Brian Yorkey, based on Asher's novel Thirteen Reasons Why.
