= Hembree (band) =

American indie rock band

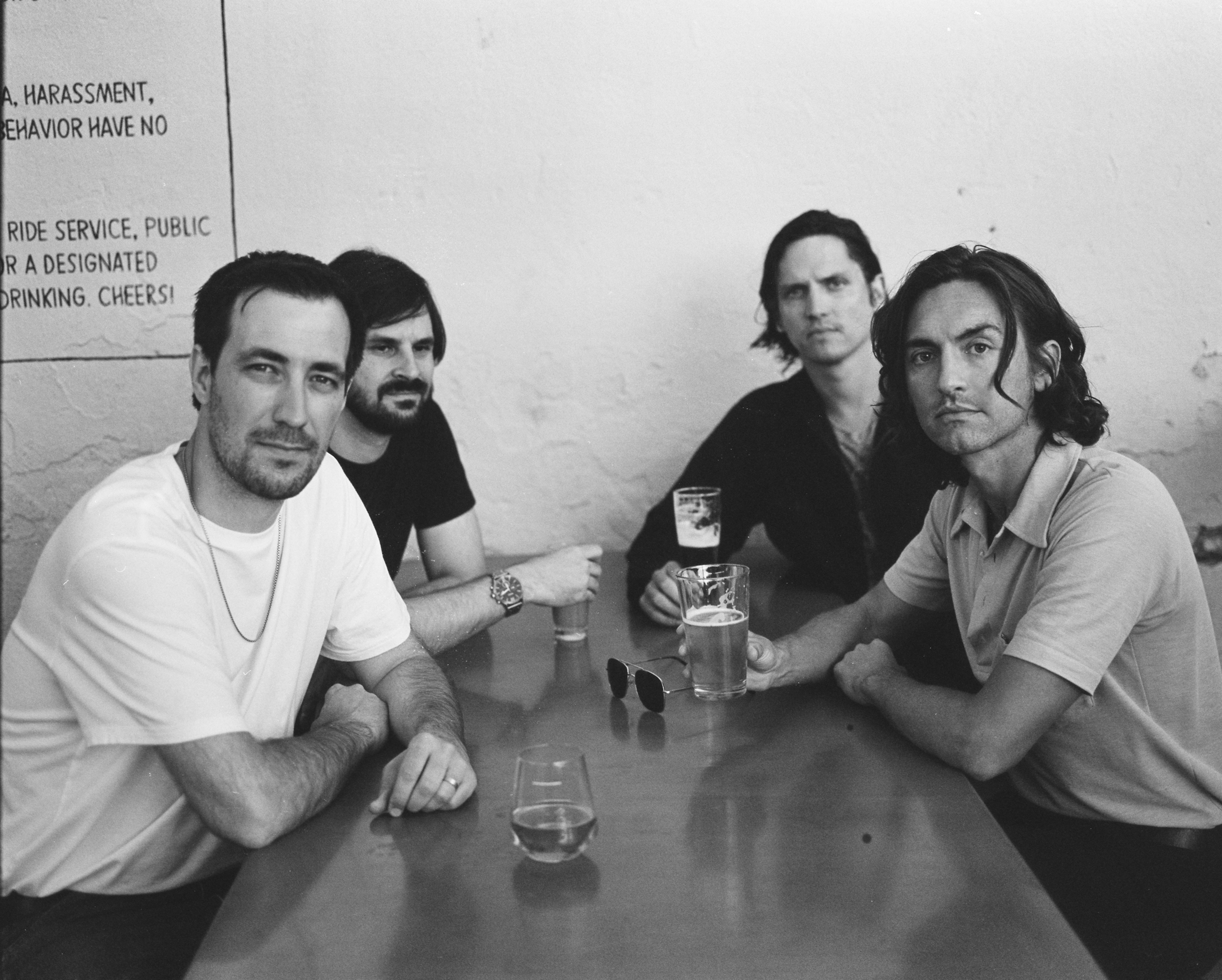

Background information
- Origin: Lawrence, Kansas
- Genres: Indie rock; Alternative
- Years active: 2015–present
- Labels: Thirty Tigers, Ribbon Music, ONErpm
- Members: Isaac Flynn; Eric Davis; Alex Ward; Austin Ward
- Past members: Garrett Childers
- Website: www.hembreemusic.com

Hembree is an indie rock band from Lawrence, Kansas. The band is based in Los Angeles, California. Hembree consists of Isaac Flynn, Eric Davis, Alex Ward, and Austin Ward. The band began releasing songs independently in 2015. Hembree is signed to Thirty Tigers of Nashville, Tennessee. Their debut studio album, House on Fire, was released in April 2019.

== History ==
Hembree was founded by Isaac Flynn, Garrett Childers, and Eric Davis. In 2018, brothers Alex and Austin Ward joined the band, solidifying the lineup.

The band first gained national attention when their single "Holy Water" was featured in an Apple commercial that aired during Super Bowl LII. Their music has since appeared in high-profile placements, including ESPN’s Monday Night Football, Bose campaigns, and the Netflix series 13 Reasons Why ("Culture") and Outer Banks ("Continents"). In 2022, their song "Reach Out" was also featured in the Netflix show Boo, Bitch.

Hembree signed with Thirty Tigers to release their debut full-length album House on Fire in April 2019. That year, they toured and played festivals including Hangout Music Festival and Music Midtown, and joined Alt Nation’s Advanced Placement Tour with Bloxx and Warbly Jets. In December, they supported The Get Up Kids on an 11-date run.

The band made their European debut in fall 2018 and has since supported acts such as Elvis Costello, Phoenix, Cold War Kids, Vance Joy, JR JR, Kaleo, Phantom Planet, and Joywave. In 2023, they performed at WonderStruck Festival in support of Nelly.

Hembree’s third album, Better Days, featured the single "Wonderful Life," which debuted on SiriusXM's Alt Nation, while the title track "Better Days" charted on college radio.

Known for live performances, Hembree regularly plays at the desert venue Pappy & Harriet’s. They also appear at Thundergong!, a Kansas City charity event benefiting Steps of Faith, hosted by Jason Sudeikis.

== Media appearances ==
Hembree was named one of NPR's Slingshot 2018 Artists to Watch.

Rolling Stone named Hembree as one of the thirty best artists at SXSW 2018.

"Had It All" debuted on Zane Lowe's Beats 1 on January 19, 2017. Lowe described the song as "absolutely fantastic."

"Holy Water" was featured in Apple's HomePod "Distortion" TV spot, which ran during Super Bowl LII, the 60th Annual Grammy Awards, and the 2018 Winter Olympics.

The single

"Continents" was featured on Kitsuné America 5: The NBA Edition.

== Members ==
=== Current ===
- Isaac Flynn – guitar, bass, lead vocals (2015–present)
- Eric Davis – keys, synth (2015–present)
- Alex Ward – guitar, bass (2018–present)
- Austin Ward – drums (2018–present)

=== Former ===
- Garrett Childers – bass, vocals (2015–2024)

== Discography ==
Albums
Title	Label	Release date
House on Fire	Thirty Tigers / Oread Records	April 26, 2019
It’s a Dream!	House of Wertz / Oread Records	February 4, 2022
Better Days	Oread Records / ONErpm	August 9, 2024

Extended plays
Title	Label	Release date
Had It All	Ribbon Music / Domino Records	2017

Singles
Title	Label	Release date
"Can't Run Forever"	Independent	2015
"Holy Water"	Ribbon Music / Domino Records	2017
"Continents"	Kitsuné	2018
