= Carolyn Mackler =

American novelist

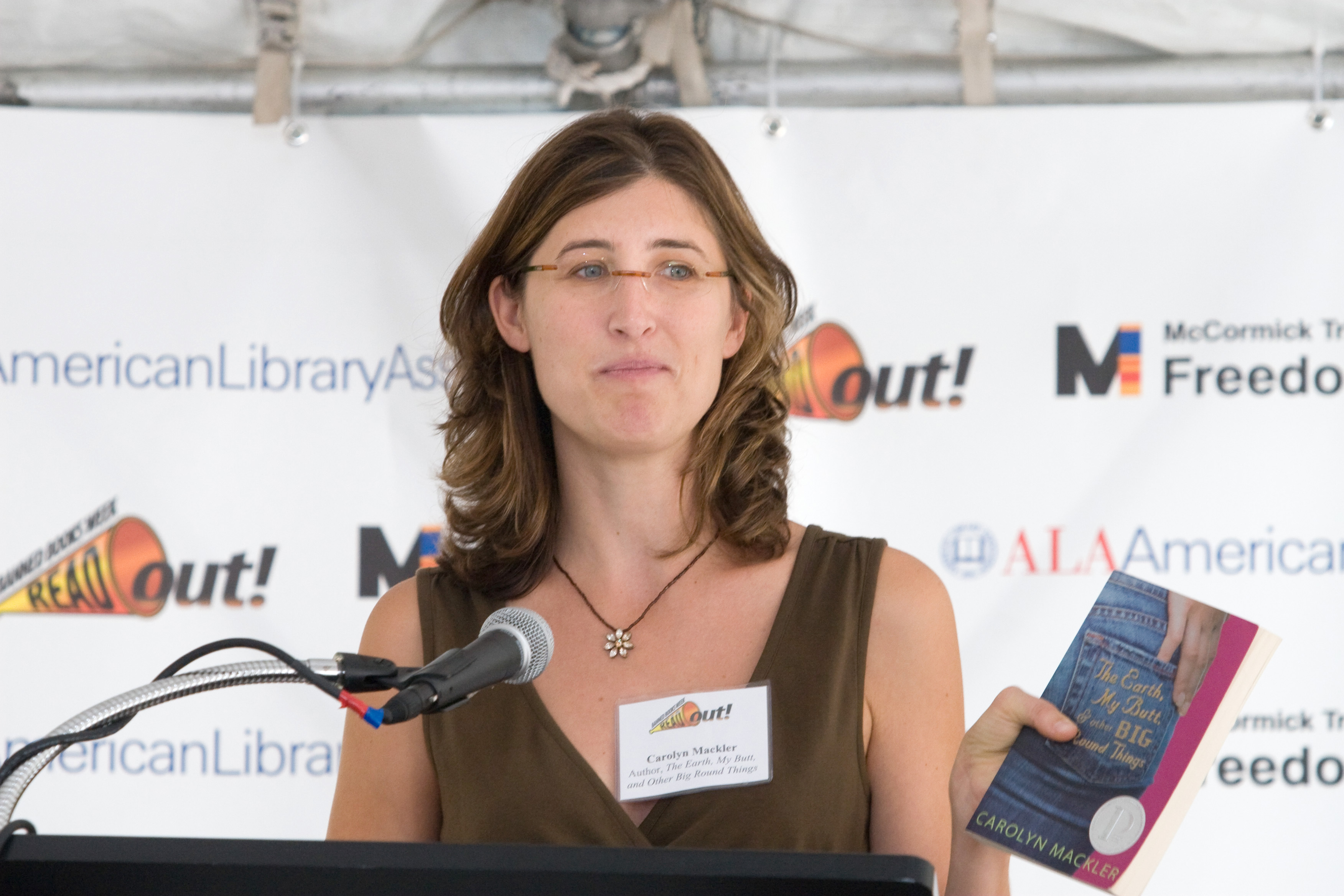
- Mackler at the Banned Books Week Read-Out in Chicago, 2007
- Born: July 13, 1973 (age 53); New York City, U.S.
- Education: Vassar College
- Occupation: Author
- Writing career
- Notable works: The Earth, My Butt, and Other Big Round Things (2003); Vegan Virgin Valentine (2004); The Future of Us (2011)

Carolyn Mackler (born July 13, 1973 in Manhattan) is an American author. She has written ten novels for teens and young people, including Infinite in Between; Not If I Can Help It; The Earth, My Butt, and Other Big Round Things, which won an honorable mention from the Michael L. Printz award; Vegan Virgin Valentine; Guyaholic; and Tangled. Her first novel for adults, The Wife App, received praise from authors such as Judy Blume and Gabrielle Zevin.

== Personal life ==
Mackler was born in Manhattan, but when she was one her parents moved from Greenwich Village to Syracuse, New York, and finally to Brockport, New York, which is the setting for many of her novels. Her mother read to her often and her father told her stories of his own life. Mackler was always interested in writing, and from an early age tested her talent at it. Beginning at age four recorded stories on a tape recorder, and dictated her stories to her mother who wrote them down for her. She lived in Brockport until leaving for college in 1991. From 1991 to 1995 she attended Vassar College where she obtained a degree in Art History in 1995. After college, Mackler lived in Seattle, Washington briefly before returning to New York City in December 1995. In 2003, Mackler married her husband and they now live in an apartment in Manhattan with their two sons.

== Career ==
Mackler said that in college, she realized that she loved writing as much as she loved to read. A few months after returning to New York City, Mackler took an internship at Ms. magazine where she began writing articles and learning about the writing world. However, Mackler was never satisfied with writing for a magazine and in 1997 decided to take a course at NYU entitled Beginning Your Novel. During this time, Mackler began her first draft of Love and Other Four-Letter Words. It was published in 2000 by Random House Children's Books. Her second novel The Earth, My Butt, and Other Big Round Things was released in 2003, the year Mackler and her husband married. The Earth, My Butt, and Other Big Round Things was one of the top 10 most challenged books in 2009 as reported to the Office for Intellectual Freedom. This novel also won the Printz Honor Award, and the next year Mackler published Vegan Virgin Valentine. Her novel Guyaholic was released in August 2007, and Tangled was published in 2009.

In 2011, Mackler and Jay Asher, co-authored The Future of Us, which received starred reviews and landed on several bestseller lists. In 2015, Mackler released her first middle grade novel, Best Friend Next Door, and her seventh YA novel, Infinite in Between. Infinite in Between received starred reviews from Publishers Weekly, Kirkus, School Library Journal, and VOYA. In 2018, Mackler is re-releasing a modernized version of The Earth, My Butt, and Other Big Round Things and also publishing its sequel, The Universe Is Expanding and So Am I.

Mackler's ability to capture a genuine teenage girl's voice is attributed to her enjoyment of listening to girls talk about their own lives. She also writes down dialogue she hears teens using when riding the bus or sitting in a cafe.

She was a judge for the National Book Awards in 2008.

== Influences ==
Mackler was a self-proclaimed misfit in junior high; she never felt she completely fit in, and this has been a determining factor in her deciding to write young adult novels. Throughout junior high and high school, Mackler read many young adult novels in order to escape the belief that no one understood her. She read voraciously, but among her favorite authors were: Judy Blume, Lois Lowry, M.E. Kerr, and Norma Klein. Mackler writes on her website of the importance of novels for young adults and their influence on her:

"People often ask me now why I write novels for teenagers. Lots of reasons. One of the biggest reasons is that I honestly believe that, along with certain friendships, I was saved by the books I read during those years. They spoke to me in a way that nothing else did. They helped me feel less alone. They made me laugh. They made me feel like there was a world bigger than my high school."

== Works ==
=== Novels for adults ===
- The Wife App (2023)

=== Young adult novels ===
- Love and Other Four-Letter Words (2000)
- Vegan Virgin Valentine (2004)
- Guyaholic (2007)
- Tangled (2009)
- The Future of Us (2011) - Co-written with Jay Asher
- Infinite in Between (2015)

==== Virginia Shreves series ====
- The Earth, My Butt, and Other Big Round Things (2003, Michael L. Printz Honor)
- The Universe Is Expanding and So Am I (2018)

=== Middle grade novels ===
- Best Friend Next Door (2015)
- Not If I Can Help It (2019)
- Right Back At You (2025)
