= The Earth, My Butt, and Other Big Round Things =

2003 book by Carolyn Mackler

- First edition
- Author: Carolyn Mackler
- Language: English
- Genre: Young adult fiction
- Publisher: Candlewick Press
- Publication date: 2003
- Publication place: United States
- Media type: Print Hardcover
- Pages: 304pp
- ISBN: 1-84428-293-7

The Earth, My Butt, and Other Big Round Things is a 2003 young adult novel by Carolyn Mackler. It follows the life of Virginia Shreves, who lives in New York City.

== Plot summary ==
Virginia "Ginny" Shreves is an overweight, self-conscious sophomore at a private high school in Manhattan. She has a make out buddy, Froggy Welsh the Fourth, and she doesn't want him, or anyone, for that matter, to see her fat. She hides her fat by wearing baggy clothing. Early in the novel, she doesn't really know how she feels about Froggy, but later she starts to see herself in a new light and realizes that she actually likes this guy she has been fooling around with. Her older sister, Anaïs, joined the Peace Corps and moved to Africa in order to escape her mother, whom she calls The Queen of Denial. Her older brother, Byron, whom she idolizes, was suspended from Columbia University for committing date rape. This event forced her to completely reevaluate her opinion of her big brother.

Virginia finally stands up to her mother and gains control of her life. She goes to Seattle to see her best friend Shannon, and buys the ticket without telling her mom. Towards the end, she becomes rebellious; she dyes her hair purple and gets her eyebrow pierced. She also makes new friends while she realizes what she wants to become and the value in herself as a person. She also realizes that she must understand who she is on the inside and that this is much more important than external appearances. She takes up kickboxing, and realizes that it is fine to change the way one looks on the outside, as long as this is done for the right reasons and the changes have a positive impact on a person physically and emotionally.

== Characters ==
- Virginia Shreves is the protagonist. She battles with her weight and place in society.
- Anaïs Shreves is Virginia's older sister who is described as beautiful and thin. She is a feminist and in the Peace Corps.
- Byron Shreves is Virginia's older brother. He is handsome and popular, and his parents believe him to be a model child. Virginia's own image of him is shattered after he commits date rape.
- Shannon Iris Malloy-Newman is Virginia's best friend. She currently lives in Walla Walla, Washington and has a stuttering problem.
- Dr. Phyllis Shreves is an adolescent psychologist who does not want to acknowledge her own family's flaws. She is obsessed with Virginia's weight.
- Mike Shreves is a laid-back Yankees fan who does not think that the things he says about Virginia's weight affect her.
- Froggy Welsh the Fourth is Virginia's dorky friend-with-benefits.

== Major themes ==
One critic believed a possible theme could be "though you are a larger size, it doesn't mean that you don't have a heart." Another colleague said, "Her gradually evolving ability to stand up to her family is hard one and not always believable, but it provides a hopeful ending for those trying to stand on their own two feet."

== Reception ==
The reception to the book is varied. One Reviewer noted that the "pacing is excellent and Mackler perfectly conveys the nuances of teen insecurity in all its painfully glory." However, the same critic also stated, "The author tries to deal with too many issues and ends up giving many of them short shift." Kirkus reviews, LLC calls the novel "easy read with substance and spirit," "eminently accessible," and "sexuality, refreshingly, is treated as a good thing." Yet there are still more positive comments such as this book has a "superior plotline" and some "fascinating words." Gail Richmond of The School Library Journal gave the novel a positive review: "Told through first-person narrative, journal entries, and e-mail, Virginia's story will interest readers who are looking for one more book with teen angst, a bit of romance, and a kid who is a bit like them or their friends." Jennifer M. Brabander of Horn Book Magazine also lauded the novel, saying, "Mackler does a fine job introducing girls to a very cool chick with a little meat on her bones." A Publishers Weekly review says, "The e-mails she exchanges with Shannon, and the lists she makes (e.g., "The Fat Girl Code of Conduct") add both realism and insight to her character. The heroine's transformation into someone who finds her own style and speaks her own mind is believable — and worthy of applause".

The book has also sparked some negative responses, Diane Roback goes so far as to say, "Mackler occasionally uses a heavy hand when it comes to making her points." She also says, "The date rape story line is . . . gutsy." The book has even undergone criticism to decide whether the book should be banned from schools. Carroll County Maryland superintendent Charles I. Ecker banned the novel "because of profane language and sexual content." Mackler's response to this ordeal is that she "wanted to portray teenagers experiences realistically." She includes that it "expressed disappointment that the book is being banned in middle schools."

== Awards ==
- Michael L. Printz Award for Honor Book
- American Library Association Best Books for Young Adults
- Pennsylvania School Librarians Association Young Adult Top Forty Title

== Controversy, possible film adaptation and sequel ==
In February 2008, the book was removed from school libraries in Colorado Springs, Colorado. The decision to ban the book was challenged by the National Coalition Against Censorship.

In early June 2010 various postings on the author's website speculated about a possible film adaptation, which led to many questions about a time line for a film adaptation. No deal has been made.

A follow up titled “The Universe Is Expanding and So Am I” was published in 2018.
