= Vegan Virgin Valentine =

Book by Carolyn Mackler

- First edition
- Author: Carolyn Mackler
- Language: English
- Genre: Young Adult Fiction
- Publisher: Candlewick Press
- Publication date: 2004
- Publication place: USA
- Media type: Print
- Pages: 228
- ISBN: 978-1-4156-7022-4

Vegan Virgin Valentine (2004) is a young adult novel by Carolyn Mackler. The book has been on book pick lists for the ALA, New York Public Library, and Teen Reads Week. The book has also been banned in some locations because of "inappropriate language".

== Plot ==
The story follows Mara Valentine, an overachiever high school senior in Brockport, New York headed to Yale University. Mara is a straight A student forever, got type A personality, vice president of student council, UN Model, is at the top of her class and she's competing with her ex-boyfriend Travis Hart for valedictorian. Yet she found her life is turned upside down when her sixteen-year-old niece Vivienne, who goes only by her first initial V, comes to live with Mara and her parents. V’s mother, Mara’s older sister, is a free-spirit who spends her life traveling from place to place, finding new jobs and boyfriends along the way; she is the complete opposite of Mara who has spent her life working hard to succeed in school to please her parents.

== Reception ==
Critical reception for Vegan Virgin Valentine has been positive. Publishers Weekly wrote that "Readers won't find anything groundbreaking here, but they will likely be entertained along the way". Kirkus Reviews called the book "funny and optimistic". The School Library Journal praised the book's romance, stating that Mara's problems with life in general would "have strong appeal for teens grappling with these same questions". Booklist stated that “by the book's conclusion, Mara is still a virgin and is not a vegan, but her transformation has been entirely credible and, for readers anyway, thoroughly enjoyable”.
