= Clay Jensen =

- Thirteen Reasons Why character
- Dylan Minnette as Clay Jensen
- First appearance: Novel: "Cassette 1: Side A" (2007); Television: "Tape 1, Side A" (2017)
- Last appearance: Novel: "Cassette 7: Side B" (2007); Television: "Graduation" (2020)
- Created by: Jay Asher
- Portrayed by: Dylan Minnette

In-universe information
- Full name: Clayton Jason Jensen
- Aliases: Helmet & Astronomy Boy (by Hannah)
- Occupation: Student (formerly); Clerk (formerly)
- Family: Matthew Jensen (father); Lainie Jensen (mother); Justin Foley (late adopted brother)
- Significant others: Hannah Baker (late crush/best friend); Skye Miller (ex-girlfriend); Amorowat Anisia Achola (ex-girlfriend); Heidi (girlfriend)

Clayton Jason "Clay" Jensen is a fictional character created by author Jay Asher. He is the protagonist in Thirteen Reasons Why, a novel where a girl, Hannah Baker, dies by suicide. Clay is also the main character in the Netflix television series adaptation of Asher's story, 13 Reasons Why, where he is portrayed by Dylan Minnette.

Clay is the protagonist in the series and his major storylines have included his friendships with Hannah Baker and Tony Padilla. Other major storylines have included his reactions to the tapes and his deteriorating mental health, such as his struggle with anxiety and depression.

Known as the actor’s breakthrough role, Minnette's performance as Clay was widely acclaimed by critics, who noted his effective portrayal of teenage angst and vulnerability.

== Storylines ==
In the Netflix series, Clay is an American high school student who is both a friend and brief love interest of Hannah, one of Clay's schoolmates. Both in the Netflix series and the book, Hannah's experiences prior to her death is told through Clay's eyes as he reacts to the content of Hannah's cassette tapes which she utilized to explain why she committed suicide. Although Hannah leaves explicit instructions before her suicide that Clay should listen to the tapes, she makes it clear that Clay is not one of her reasons for killing herself, but rather she wanted him to know exactly why she took her own life. At one point, in a vision of what Clay thought would happen if he told Mrs. Baker (Hannah's mother) about the tapes, he sees her strangling him with a cord.

In the second season, after the parents of Hannah Baker sue the school district for wrongful death, Clay and other students are asked to testify about what she went through. During their testimonies, Clay discovers things about Hannah that were not mentioned on the tapes, and questions what kind of person she really was. He also finds out that Hannah was not the only person who bad things happened to at the high school, and takes it upon himself to get to the root of the problem and stop it. Throughout this time, he constantly sees and has auditory hallucinations of Hannah speaking to him, as a manifestation of his guilt for not being able to help her while she was alive.

In the third season, Clay has, to a degree, recovered from his depression and violent tendencies, and along with the other people on the tapes, tries to help others do the same. However, after Bryce Walker, who raped Hannah before her death, is murdered, Clay becomes the prime suspect due to their history. Throughout the season, aided by his friends, Clay tries to find out who may have committed the murder, while those around him believe him to be guilty.

In the fourth season, Clay had interviews with the admissions officer from Brown and was accepted. His therapist (Gary Sinise) is introduced as a source of support for his depression and anxiety. He will go to Brown University after graduating from Liberty High School.

His mother is a lawyer who worked on the case on Evergreen County's side before withdrawing while his father is an English professor.

== Appearances ==
Clay Jensen is a junior at Liberty High School. He is the subject of Tape 6, Side A, although not as a reason for Hannah's suicide, unlike all the other tapes. At the end of his tape, she explains that she felt he needed to know her reasons behind why she took her life. Clay is considered to be socially awkward and usually doesn't talk much. He is a very good kid that doesn't usually give into peer pressure. He is known for kindness and good behavior. He worked with Hannah at The Crestmont movie theater. On his first shift there, he tells Hannah that he has lived in the town of Crestmont for his entire life.

He was previously rumored to be gay by other classmates at Liberty High School but these rumors appear to have died down before the events of "13 Reasons Why". Due to Clay's introverted character, he is known to not attend parties. At Hannah's House party, Kat tells Hannah that the last time she saw Clay at a party was for her birthday in the 4th grade, actually betting against Clay attending the party. Clay also has a history of depression and anxiety as his parents offer him Duloxetine in Tape 1, Side B, which he has taken before for an unknown reason. Duloxetine is an antidepressant used to treat people who have depression or general anxiety disorder which suggests Clay may have been in a bad state previously.

== Development ==
It was announced in June 2016 that Dylan Minnette was cast in the role of Clay Jensen. In an article on website "People", it was noted that Minnette had a connection with his character. He also said in an interview with them "my life wasn’t escaping the character — you can’t really escape it. At the same time, I started to see so much of myself in Clay, and see so much of Clay in me that sometimes I’d be on set and it would affect me a lot more".

Minnette said in an interview about Clay's role in season two "When season two starts, we find Clay trying to move on with his life. He's trying to be happy and he's trying to live a normal life, but I think he realises pretty quickly that that is not possible. He still has to live with the memory of Hannah, which is very personal to him, and it takes him down some pretty dark roads. He tries to fight it, but he knows he can't." In another interview about Season Two, Minnette went to say there wouldn't be many scenes in season two between his character Clay and Hannah. He also revealed that Skye and Clay could have a potential relationship.

== Reception ==
The Express said that the actor had won "legions of fans in the role of Clay". In the article on the website "People", they noted how Minnette's followers had "ballooned", especially on Instagram. A reviewer for IGN said "Minnette does a fine job in what's often a difficult role, though the show does rely a little too much on shots of Clay gazing wistfully into the distance as he reminisces about his interactions with Hannah" about Clay's character. The reviewer also commented about the actors of Clay and Hannah by saying "Langford and Minnette are often at their best together, channeling just the right sort of warm but awkward chemistry you'd expect from two teens who can't quite admit to their feelings for one another."

A Daily Mirror article, however, expressed disappointment when it came to Clay's tape in the series by saying "It turns out Clay's 'reason' isn't even a reason why, and in so many ways that makes it even more devastating. It feels like that's the end."
