= Hannah Baker =

Fictional character from Thirteen Reasons Why

- Thirteen Reasons Why character
- Katherine Langford as Hannah Baker
- First appearance: Novel: "Cassette 1: Side A" (2007); Television: "Tape 1, Side A" (2017)
- Last appearance: Novel: "Cassette 7: Side B" (2007); Television: "Graduation" (2020)
- Created by: Jay Asher
- Portrayed by: Katherine Langford

In-universe information
- Occupation: Novel: Student (formerly); Television: Student (formerly); Clerk (formerly)
- Family: Andrew "Andy" Baker (father); Olivia "Liv" Baker (mother)
- Born: Novel; Television: August 28, 2000
- Died: Novel; Television: October 9, 2017
- Cause of Death: Novel: Suicide by intentional pill overdose Television: Suicide by arm laceration

Hannah Baker is a fictional character created by American author Jay Asher. She is the subject of his 2007 young adult fiction mystery novel Thirteen Reasons Why, which was adapted by the media company Netflix as 13 Reasons Why. Hannah is introduced as a sophomore at the fictional Liberty High School, where she is sexually labelled, abused and assaulted in the struggle to adjust to living in an unsympathetic school environment. She ends up dying by suicide later on.

In the television series, Baker is portrayed by Australian actress and model Katherine Langford.

Though the first season of 13 Reasons Why received highly positive reviews, the show's later seasons' reception became increasingly divisive among critics and audiences. While critics were split into several aspects of the show, in particular how it handled mental health and its depictions of rape and suicide, Langford's performance was highly praised. Langford later received a Golden Globe Award nomination for her performance in 2018.

== Storyline (television series) ==
At the beginning of the series, 17-year-old schoolgirl Hannah Baker took her own life by cutting her wrists. Her school locker becomes a memorial adorned with students' letters and her pictures. On his doorstep, Hannah's friend Clay Jensen finds a box containing seven audio cassette tapes. Each subsequent tape reveals Hannah's thirteen reasons why she killed herself. Hannah warns listeners to follow certain rules: everyone mentioned on the tapes must listen to the complete set then pass it along to the next person addressed. Failure to follow her instructions will result in a second set of tapes being released by a classmate and close personal friend of Hannah's, later revealed to be Tony. Clay, who was in love with Hannah, reminisces about the time he spent with her. He finds listening to Hannah's story difficult, but his friend Tony finds him and reveals he plays a part in enforcing Hannah's will by making sure the tapes are heard; he knows Clay is mentioned on them. He warns Clay things will go wrong if he does not obey the tapes.

Clay listens to the first tape, side Justin Foley. Hannah had just moved to town and became friends with her neighbor Kat, who is moving away to college and introduced her to her ex-boyfriend Justin Foley, along with his friend Zach Dempsey. Hannah made a few meet-cutes with Justin before deciding to hang out with him later in the evening at the park. Justin, managing to take a revealing photo of Hannah and having kissed her, showed the photo to his friends that Bryce Walker spread through the school, which embarrassed Hannah. Hannah tried to gather herself by confiding in Clay, but he made a hurtful comment and Hannah felt isolated.

On the first tape, side B is revealed to be Jessica Davis; Hannah talks about her friendship with Jessica and Alex Standall, with the two later dating in secret and having abandoned Hannah. When Hannah found out, Alex broke up with Jessica and wrote a "Hot or Not" list with the two friends opposite each other. Jessica blamed Hannah and publicly slapped her. In the present, Hannah's mother, Olivia Baker, finds the "hot or not" list, leading her to believe her daughter was being bullied. She seeks the school principal's help but because she and her husband have sued the school, they cannot help her more than what the school intends to help with.

On the second tape, side A, Alex Standall is the next reason. Clay confronts Alex about the list and learns that he wrote the list to get back at Jessica for refusing to have sex with him. The list eventually puts a target on Hannah's back for sexual harassment, particularly from Bryce who not only groped her but later raped her. As Clay progresses through the tapes, he encounters the others mentioned on Hannah's recordings, stopping to question each one. He discovers that Hannah felt that everyone on the tapes either took advantage of her or abandoned her. At the same time, almost everyone mentioned on the tapes either tried to threaten Clay or befriend him to alleviate their own guilt in the death of Hannah.

Second tape, side B: Tyler Down, the school photographer. Having a crush on Hannah, Tyler stalked Hannah at school and at her home in the middle of the night, taking photos of her. Hannah did not know it was him and shared her fear of her stalker to Courtney Crimsen; Courtney volunteered to sleep over and the two play Truth or Dare, stripping their clothes and eventually kissing. They caught Tyler who took photos of them and he distributed their photo throughout the school when Hannah refused to date him despite her plea for him to destroy the photo. To avenge Hannah, Clay then takes a photo of Tyler while he was changing in his room and circulates this photo to the school. Tyler is viciously bullied because of this and the majority of the people from the tape detest him for his disgusting habit.

Third tape, side A: Courtney Crimsen. Afraid that she would be outed as a lesbian, Courtney threw Hannah under the bus by lying that the photo is Hannah and another lesbian named Laura when the boys at school taunted her. Furthermore, she added to the rumor about Hannah and Justin. Clay further makes Courtney feel guilty by luring her to Hannah's grave to have her see that there is nothing wrong with being a lesbian, but Courtney leaves him stranded. He then calls Tony to pick him up while his mother is informed that he left school and never came back.

Third tape, side B: Marcus Cole, the student President. During Dollar Valentine, Hannah was matched with Marcus and she gave him a chance for a date at a diner. Marcus not only showed up an hour late but brought friends to witness the date. When Hannah discovered that he was trying to sexually molest her in front of his friends, she pushed him away and he humiliated her in public. Among his friends that came was Zach who sympathized with her while she wept.

Fourth tape, side A: Zach Dempsey. Following Marcus' rejection, Zach tried to befriend Hannah but she publicly rejected him as well, embarrassing him. In a social experiment in the class in which students can anonymously give a positive note to other students, Hannah realized that her notes are being taken and found out that Zach had been taking them after class. She anonymously wrote a note for him and publicly confronted for targeting her, but revealed that he threw the note away. During a basketball game, Clay keys Zach's car out of rage where he is discovered by Skye Miller, a classmate he was once friends with. Zach and his mother later accuses Clay of keying the car and Zach secretly admits to Clay that he kept the letter Hannah wrote to him.

Fourth tape, side B: Ryan Shaver. Hannah joined a poetry club and met classmate Ryan Shaver. The two bond over poetry but Ryan betrayed her by publishing her personal poem in the school magazine "Lost 'n Found" that she had been reluctant to share. Hannah was further humiliated when her class decided to discuss about the poem, not knowing who the author was. Hannah broke off her friendship with Ryan. In the present day, Tony confides in Clay about the night of Hannah's death.

Fifth tape, side A: Justin Foley again. During a party at Jessica's house, Hannah found out that she is dating Justin. As there were three reasons to this story, Hannah omitted why she was in Jessica's room in the first place, but that with her hiding in the closet, she witnessed Jessica's rape by Bryce, and blamed Justin for not being able to help her. Hannah was afraid to tell anyone and left with classmate Sheri Holland. In the present, Justin, who had been violent with Clay, is now being confronted by him to tell Jessica the truth: that she was raped and that he needs to stop protecting Bryce.

Fifth tape, side B: Sheri Holland. After witnessing Jessica's rape, Hannah left with Sheri because she claimed she was sober. However, Sheri knocked down a stop sign and abandoned Hannah when she insisted they call someone about it. Hannah made her way to a nearby gas station and called the police about the sign, but they tell her someone had already called "it" in. The knocked down stop sign later resulted in the death of Jeff Atkins, best friend of Clay Jensen. The school was under the impression that Jeff drove drunk while Hannah tried to admit her guilt in indirectly killing Jeff but Clay dismisses her. In the present, Clay forces Sheri to admit to Jeff's parents that she indirectly killed Jeff because his parents were under the impression that he drove drunk. However, Sheri refuses to.

Sixth tape, side A: Clay Jensen. Hannah explains why she was in the closet and witnessed Jessica's rape. Having always been fond of Clay and hoping for a fresh start, Hannah shows up to Jessica's party with Clay's invitation and admitted her feelings for him. In Jessica's room, the two partially initiate sex before Hannah, traumatized by her negative encounters with the boys at school, screamed at Clay to leave. Thinking he has provoked Hannah's breakdown, Clay left and Hannah hid in the closet when she heard Justin and Jessica coming into the room. However, Justin left when Jessica was too inebriated to respond to him. She overheard Justin reluctantly allowing Bryce to enter the room, in which he then proceeded to rape a barely conscious Jessica. At the end of the tape, Hannah admits that Clay does not deserve to be on the tapes but that she could not have told her story without talking about him. In the present day, Olivia finds a list with all the names of the people on the tapes but does not know the meaning behind them. The Bakers decide to file a lawsuit against the school and almost everyone on the list is subpoenaed. It is revealed that the Bakers are having financial problems with the store.

Sixth tape, side B: Bryce Walker. Hannah reveals that this was "the most difficult day" of her life. Hannah saw that her parents are financially struggling and offered to help, but they refused to take money from her. After losing her parents' business deposits, she took a late night stroll as a solution to her growing depression and came upon Bryce's pool party. She stripped down to her undergarments to join in on the hot tub before being raped by Bryce after everyone, including Jessica and Justin, left. Returning home, she started to recall how her life came to this point and made a list of people who had hurt her and decided that "no one will hurt me again." In the present, Jessica has mentally and emotionally suffered because of Justin's absence in their relationship. To gain his attention, she becomes close to Bryce, triggering Justin and he then accuses Bryce of raping Jessica.

Seventh tape, side A: Mr. Porter. After recording the tapes, Hannah felt "something shift", and decided to get help and give life one more try. She went to see school counselor Mr. Porter and, while secretly recording their conversation, vaguely and reluctantly admitted that she had been raped. Mr. Porter cannot make her disclose the identity of her rapist and Hannah refuses to get her parents or police involved so he gives her the only option of moving on. Hannah abruptly leaves, despite hoping that he would want to help her enough to chase after her. When he did not, she then dropped off her uniform at the Crestmont and left the tapes at Tony's front door. Afterwards, she returned home to fill the tub with water, slit her wrists, and died from bloodloss. Her parents were revealed to have discovered her and called the police but were too late to save her.

Throughout the tapes, the group (excluding Jessica, Sheri, and Bryce) find that Clay is uncontrollable so Marcus plants weed he purchased from Bryce in his bag, successfully forcing Clay to be suspended. At this time, Clay confides in his mother regarding hypothetical situations similar to Bryce's criminal activities and Jessica's rape but will not reveal anything else. Furthermore, knowing that Bryce is the next person he should be handing the tapes off to, Clay instead goes to see him under the pretense of buying weed. Secretly recording their conversation to the seventh tape, side B, Clay suffers a beating but gets Bryce to admit that he had raped Hannah. Before passing the tape on to the final person, Mr. Porter, Clay has Tony record the last tape of Bryce's confession to his second set of tapes. Feeling guilty that her parents never received answers regarding their daughter's suicide, Tony converts the tapes into mp3 format and hands it over to Mrs. Baker. During the deposition of Hannah's classmates, while the other classmates maintain their story that Hannah was a troubled person, Tyler eventually admits that she made tapes of reasons why she killed her self, revealing that Clay was the last person to have them. Jessica ends her relationship with Justin while he decides to run away from town. The season ends with Jessica admitting to her father about her rape and Clay reconnecting with Skye.

It was also revealed that Hannah's family moved to Evergreen County to get away from the previous school, where Hannah played the part of the mean girl just to fit in. Her mother Olivia, who was sometimes seen drinking, strangled Clay after listening to one of Hannah's tapes in a hallucination that Clay had. Olivia also told Hannah that she was the popular one in high school, and told the court that she was sexually assaulted at an early age. Her father Andy owned a pharmacy from his parents' loan before closing up for good and divorced after seeing someone else.

== Development ==
=== Characterization ===
In the scenes where Clay remembers Hannah being alive, his world is full of bright and vibrant colours, but when he is brought back to a reality without Hannah in it, his world is much darker, full of harsher shades of blue and grey.

— Caitlin Hacker, writing on the use of different camera filters for depicting life before and after Hannah's death, Popsugar

Asher's book was criticized for the poor characterization of Hannah Baker, which many critics said the television series improved upon. In her book review for The Guardian, Katherine Hughes wrote that Hannah "comes across not so much as a young soul in distress as a vengeful harpy". The character was inspired by one of Asher's relatives, who had attempted suicide.

At the beginning of the series, Hannah is a 16-year-old high school junior, "from a white picket fence town with an almost perfect family". Noting the realism and relatability of the character with real-life people, Quinn Keaney of Popsugar wrote that Hannah, "is just like you ... like someone you know; she's smart, she has a bright future ahead of herself, she has loving parents, she just wants to be liked". Variety's Maureen Ryan offered a similar observation on the realistic portrayal of teenagers, writing that the "darkness" in Hannah's life is "constantly interwoven with the natural resilience and questioning optimism of adolescence". Writing for TVLine, Andy Swift described her as "a fresh-faced teen with a bright future", while Sarah Hughes of The Daily Telegraph called her "smart, funny, beautiful, and sometimes awkward in that way that teenagers are".

For most of the story, Hannah is characterized by her struggle adjusting to an unsympathetic school environment and her "desire to fit in" which "trumps everything". Her mental health deteriorates as she is subjected to bullying, slut-shaming, and physical assaults. Towards the end of the narrative, Hannah's meeting with Mr. Porter marks her complete descent into depression. While some critics lauded the honest treatment, Lauren Hoffman of Cosmopolitan said the series is so "enamored with this idea of Hannah as someone who does things to others that it neglects to tell us who she is herself". She said it was a failure of "telling a story" and a missed opportunity to "undo stigma around mental illness".

Although Hannah's story is mostly told by the use of voice-overs and flashbacks following her suicide, her character is also viewed from the perspective of Clay Jensen. In an interview with Entertainment Weekly, Asher said, "Clay is also the eyes and ears for the reader. That's the person you're connecting with." Elaborating on the use of the first-person narrative style, Joanna Robinson of Vanity Fair wrote that Clay sees Hannah "as an unattainable dream girl", and that this concept undergoes some "smart and nuanced scrutiny". Vox's Constance Grady described Hannah as "attractively damaged but secretly pure, sarcastic but unthreatening". Grady also acknowledged the connection between Clay and Hannah and wrote that the series heavily depended upon "a secret connection" between the two. She said Langford's performance preserves the character's "wide-eyed vulnerability".

=== Casting and filming ===
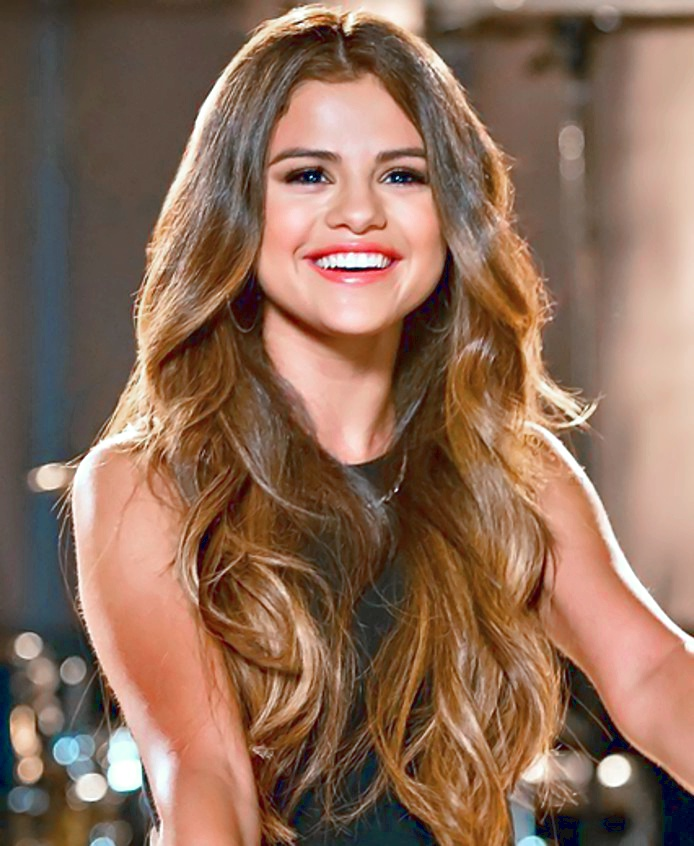
Series producer Selena Gomez (pictured) was originally to play Hannah in a film adaptation of the novel.

Hannah Baker was played by Katherine Langford on the television series; her first major acting credit. The show's director Tom McCarthy, script-writer Brian Yorkey, and the executive producer Selena Gomez selected Langford following a Skype audition. Yorkey called the casting process especially hard because of the extra effort needed to match the actor with the visions of the novel's readers. Speaking with James Gill of the Radio Times, he expressed his satisfaction on the casting of Langford and Dylan Minnette as the leading duo, and said, "It was well worth it because it was about finding two people who could not only portray Hannah and Clay but understand at a deep level what their journey is".

Universal Studios purchased film rights to Asher's novel on February 8, 2011, and Gomez began the process of casting the role of Hannah Baker. On October 29, 2015, it was announced that Netflix would be making a television adaptation of the book, with Gomez as an executive producer. Tom McCarthy was hired to direct the first two episodes. The series is produced by Anonymous Content and Paramount Television with Gomez, McCarthy, Joy Gorman, Michael Sugar, Steve Golin, Mandy Teefey, and Kristel Laiblin serving as executive producers. Filming for the show took place in the Northern Californian towns of Vallejo, Benicia, San Rafael, Crockett and Sebastopol during the summer of 2016. The first season and the special were released on Netflix on March 31, 2017.

== Reception ==
=== Critical response and analysis ===
The character of Hannah Baker received polarized responses from television critics and mental health analysts, but was more well received by the readers and audiences. Katherine Langford, however, garnered unanimous acclaim for her performance in the television series and was variously called "a revelation", "believable and raw" and "magnetic". In order to analyze the symptoms and mental health issues that Hannah Baker presents in the series, psychological tests have been evaluated through the perspective of the character to assess her emotional and mental state. Jesse Schedeen of IGN praised her performance stating, "Langford shines in the lead role [and] embodies that optimism and that profound sadness [of Hannah's] as well". Daniel Feinberg of The Hollywood Reporter praised Langford's "dynamic" performance and wrote, "Langford's heartbreaking openness makes you root for a fate you know isn't possible". Matthew Gilbert of The Boston Globe praised the chemistry of Langford and Minnette, saying, "watching these two young actors together is pure pleasure". Schedeen of IGN agreed, saying the lead actors are "often at their best together, channeling just the right sort of warm but awkward chemistry you'd expect from two teens who can't quite admit to their feelings for one another".

=== Mental Health Professionals' Response ===
The show has contained sensitive subject matter surrounding the hardships that Hannah Baker endures and lack of support from her school and school counselor before the polarizing bathtub scene where she takes her own life. Mental health professionals such as clinical psychologists, therapists, and academics have expressed major concerns about the series such as romanticizing suicide, Netflix not providing adequate resources at the conclusion of each episode, targeting a young vulnerable audience, and painting mental health professionals as unhelpful and not worth seeing. Mental health experts are also educating the general public on what to do in the situations Hannah Baker goes through and also disseminating accurate information surrounding teen suicide, depression, and youth that experience traumatic events.
