= Katherine Langford =

Australian actress (born 1996)

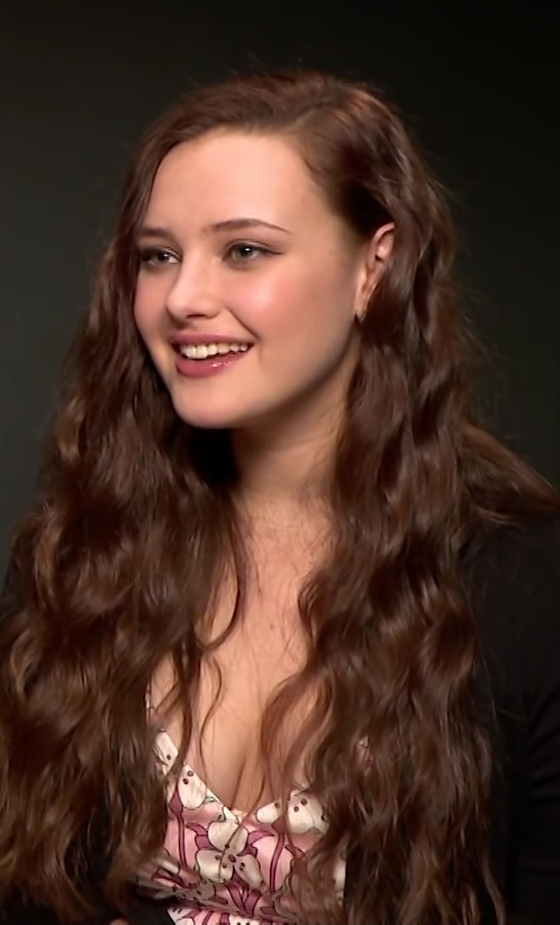
- Langford in 2018
- Born: 29 April 1996 (age 30); Perth, Australia
- Occupation: Actress
- Years active: 2015–present
- Relatives: Josephine Langford (sister)

Katherine Langford (born 29 April 1996) is an Australian actress. After appearing in several independent films, she had her breakthrough starring as Hannah Baker in the Netflix television series 13 Reasons Why (2017–2018), which earned her a Golden Globe Award nomination. She then appeared in the films Love, Simon (2018) and Knives Out (2019), and headlined the dark comedy Spontaneous (2020) and the Netflix series Cursed (2020).

== Early life ==
Langford was born in Perth, Western Australia, and raised in Applecross, a riverside suburb of Perth. She is the eldest daughter of Elizabeth Langford (née Green), a paediatrician, and Stephen Langford, a flying doctor and director of medical services at the Royal Flying Doctor Service Western Operations. Her younger sister, Josephine Langford, is also an actress.

Langford began voice lessons with Heidi Lake in 2005, and received classical, jazz, and contemporary vocal training. She was offered a place at Perth Modern School for her senior high school years, where she studied music and drama, and was sports captain and a nationally ranked swimmer.

Initially during her time at high school, Langford was interested in medicine and politics in addition to musical theatre. In 2012 as a teenager, Langford attended a Lady Gaga concert, the Born This Way Ball, which inspired her to learn to play piano. She shared videos of herself singing three original songs she wrote: "I've Got a Crush on Zoe Bosch," "Young and Stupid," and "3 Words." "Young and Stupid" is an anti-suicide song she wrote in 2013 after three Perth teens took their lives. For her final year at Perth Modern, Langford stopped swimming and switched her focus to music and performance. She was successful in a number of musical eisteddfods and drama competitions. Langford appeared in the school's production of Hotel Sorrento in 2013 and graduated that same year.

From 2014 to 2015, Langford studied at the Principal Academy of Dance & Theatre Arts, majoring in Music Theatre, and appeared in a production of Godspell. She was then one of five students selected to participate in the National Institute of Dramatic Art (NIDA) Advanced Actors Residency in 2015. Additionally, Langford was provided a spot in Western Australian Academy of Programming. In the same year, she trained at Nicholson's Academy of Screen Acting and portrayed the role of Juan Perón's mistress in its 2015 production of Evita. Langford was offered a position in the Bachelor of Arts program in acting at the Western Australian Academy of Performing Arts and intended to begin studies in 2016. However, she never enrolled and instead pursued professional roles.

== Career ==
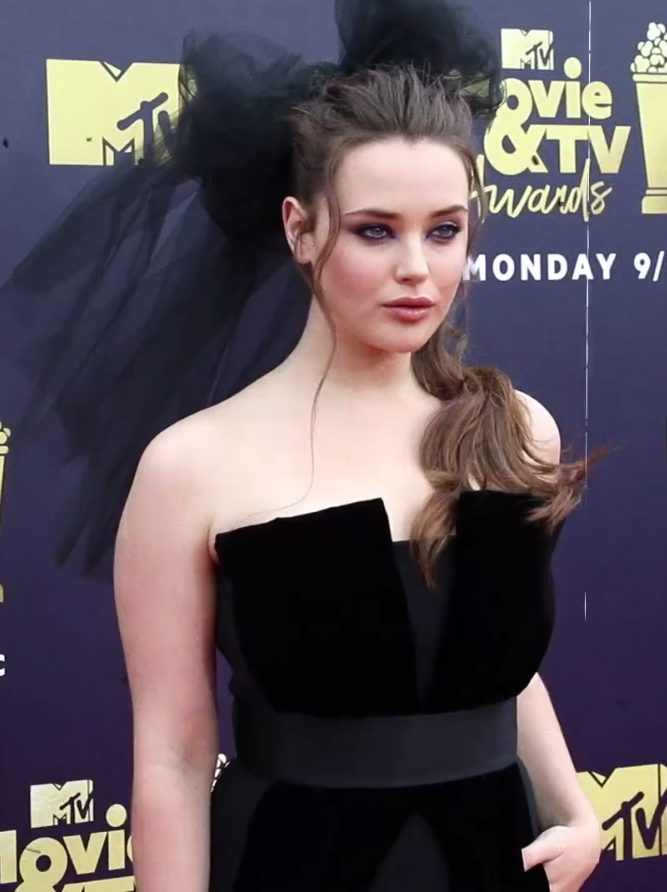
Langford at the MTV Movie & TV Awards in 2018

Langford first appeared in several small independent films, including Story of Miss Oxygen (2015), Imperfect Quadrant (2016), and Daughter (2016). She portrayed the lead character in Daughter, which debuted at the 2016 Cannes Film Festival. In 2016, after declining the offer from Western Australian Academy of Performing Arts, Langford auditioned for Will, a television series centred on the early life of William Shakespeare. She did not get the role.

Langford was then cast as Hannah Baker in the mystery teen drama TV series 13 Reasons Why, playing Baker for the series' first two seasons. When she landed the role, she had only 10 days to get an O-1 visa as she had not worked in the United States before. She researched the role, speaking with a representative of the sexual assault awareness campaign "It's On Us" and a psychiatrist who specializes in adolescent development. Several critics lauded her performance as Baker; The Hollywood Reporter wrote: "Langford's heartbreaking openness makes you root for a fate you know isn't possible. The actress' performance is full of dynamic range, setting it against Minnette's often more complicated task in differentiating between moods that mostly go from uncomfortable to gloomy to red-eyed, hygiene-starved despair." She earned various awards and nominations for the role, including a nomination for the Golden Globe Award for Best Actress – Television Series Drama. On 25 May 2018, Langford confirmed that she would not return as Hannah Baker in the third season of the series.

In December 2016, she signed with the William Morris Endeavor agency. She then appeared in her first feature film, The Misguided, an independent comedy-drama by Shannon Alexander, which premiered in January 2018. She also starred as Leah in the 2018 film Love, Simon. In October 2018, she was cast in Avengers: Endgame as an older version of Morgan Stark that appears to her father, Tony Stark (Robert Downey Jr.), in a vision shortly before his death. However, her scenes were cut from the final film when audiences at test screenings found her scene confusing.

In 2019, Langford co-starred in Knives Out, a murder mystery film. The ensemble cast received critical acclaim, and she was part of various awards and nominations for the role, which included a Critics' Choice Award nomination for Best Cast.

In 2020, she starred in the film Spontaneous, a well-reviewed, dark comedy for which she received a Critics' Choice Super Awards nomination for Best Actress in a Science Fiction/Fantasy Movie. On 12 September 2018, it was announced that Langford had been cast in the web television series Cursed. Set in a re-imagined Arthurian world, Langford portrays Nimue, a teenage girl destined to become the Lady of the Lake. It premiered on Netflix in July 2020.

In October 2022, it was announced that Langford would star in the Starz television series The Venery of Samantha Bird. The series began production in the January 2023, however, due to the 2023 Writers Guild of America strike, production was halted in May 2023. In September 2023, the network announced that they would not be resuming production on the series and the release would ultimately be scrapped, despite completing six of the eight ordered episodes.

On 23 September 2024, Langford made her stage debut, taking over as Sally Bowles in the West End musical Cabaret at the Kit Kat Club, playing at the Playhouse Theatre for 18 weeks.

== Filmography ==
=== Film ===
| Year | Title | Role | Notes |
|---|---|---|---|
| 2018 | Love, Simon | Leah Burke | |
| 2018 | The Misguided | Vesna | |
| 2019 | Knives Out | Meg Thrombey | |
| 2020 | Spontaneous | Mara Carlyle | |
| TBA | Embers † | TBA | Filming |

=== Television ===
| Year | Title | Role | Notes |
|---|---|---|---|
| 2017–2018 | 13 Reasons Why | Hannah Baker | Main role (seasons 1–2) |
| 2018 | Robot Chicken | Steffy, Wife, Bride (voices) | Episode: "No Wait, He Has a Cane" |
| 2020 | Cursed | Nimue | Main role |
| 2022 | Savage River | Miki Anderson | Main role |

=== Theatre ===
| Year | Title | Role | Venue |
|---|---|---|---|
| 2024 | Cabaret | Sally Bowles | Playhouse Theatre |

== Awards and nominations ==
| Year | Award | Category | Nominated work | Result | Ref. |
|---|---|---|---|---|---|
| 2018 | Golden Globe Awards | Best Actress – Television Series Drama | 13 Reasons Why | Nominated | |
| 2018 | MTV Movie & TV Awards | Best Actor in a Show | 13 Reasons Why | Nominated | |
| 2018 | People's Choice Awards | The Drama TV Star of 2017 | 13 Reasons Why | Nominated | |
| 2018 | Satellite Awards | Best Actress – Television Series Drama | 13 Reasons Why | Nominated | |
| 2019 | National Board of Review | Best Cast | Knives Out | Won | |
| 2020 | Critics' Choice Awards | Best Acting Ensemble | Knives Out | Nominated | |
| 2020 | Satellite Awards | Best Cast – Motion Picture | Knives Out | Won | |
| 2021 | Critics' Choice Super Awards | Best Actress in a Science Fiction/Fantasy Movie | Spontaneous | Nominated | |
