= 13 Reasons Why =

2017 American teen drama television series

- Also known as: Thirteen Reasons Why, 13RW
- Genre: Teen drama; Mystery; Psychological thriller; Coming of age
- Based on: Thirteen Reasons Why by Jay Asher
- Developed by: Brian Yorkey
- Starring: Dylan Minnette; Katherine Langford; Christian Navarro; Alisha Boe; Brandon Flynn; Justin Prentice; Miles Heizer; Ross Butler; Devin Druid; Amy Hargreaves; Derek Luke; Kate Walsh; Brian d'Arcy James; Grace Saif; Brenda Strong; Timothy Granaderos; Mark Pellegrino; Tyler Barnhardt; Jan Luis Castellanos; Deaken Bluman; Gary Sinise
- Narrated by: Katherine Langford (season 1); Various (season 2); Grace Saif (season 3); Dylan Minnette (season 4)
- Opening theme: "Oh in This World of Dread, Carry On" by Eskmo
- Composer: Eskmo
- Country of origin: United States
- Original language: English
- No. of seasons: 4
- No. of episodes: 49 (list of episodes)

Production
- Executive producers: Brian Yorkey; Diana Son; Tom McCarthy; Joy Gorman Wettels; Steve Golin; Michael Sugar; Selena Gomez; Mandy Teefey; Kristel Laiblin
- Producer: Joseph Incaprera
- Cinematography: Andrij Parekh
- Editor: Leo Trombetta
- Camera setup: Single-camera
- Running time: 49–98 minutes
- Production companies: July Moon Productions; Kicked to the Curb Productions; That Kid Ed Productions; Anonymous Content; Paramount Television Studios

Original release
- Network: Netflix
- Release: March 31, 2017 – June 5, 2020

13 Reasons Why (also stylized as TH1RTEEN R3ASONS WHY) is an American teen drama television series based on the 2007 novel Thirteen Reasons Why by author Jay Asher. Developed for Netflix by Brian Yorkey and with Selena Gomez serving as an executive producer, the series stars Dylan Minnette and Katherine Langford alongside an ensemble cast. The series follows the students of the fictional Liberty High School and the wide range of social issues affecting modern youth.

The show originally revolved around Clay Jensen (Minnette) and the aftermath of the suicide of fellow student Hannah Baker (Langford). Before her death, she leaves behind a box of cassette tapes in which she details the reasons why she chose to kill herself as well as the people she believes are responsible for her death.

The first season was released on Netflix on March 31, 2017. It became the second most watched series on Netflix at the time of its release. Netflix renewed 13 Reasons Why for a second season due to the success of the initial 13 episodes; the second season was released on May 18, 2018. A third season was released on August 23, 2019; that same month, the series was renewed for a fourth and final season, which was released on June 5, 2020.

13 Reasons Why received mixed reviews. The first season received positive reviews from critics and audiences, who praised its themes, emotional weight, subject matter, character development and acting, particularly the performances of Minnette and Langford. Subsequently, it prompted concerns from mental health professionals due to its graphic depiction of issues such as suicide, sexual assault, and bullying, along with other mature content.

The later three seasons were met with a negative critical response. Coinciding with the release of the second season, Netflix released a video with the cast that cautioned viewers about some of the topics covered in the show and provided a support website with crisis numbers for people affected by depression, anxiety, and other mental health issues. For her performance, Langford received a Golden Globe Award nomination for Best Actress – Television Series Drama.

== Series overview ==
Set in the fictional town of Crestmont, California, the first season follows Liberty High student Clay Jensen, who receives a set of cassette tapes at his front porch. These tapes were recorded by Hannah Baker, a former Liberty High student who killed herself two weeks prior and recorded thirteen reasons why she did so on the tapes. Each tape includes a reason for various people in Hannah's life – fellow students Justin Foley, Jessica Davis, Alex Standall, Tyler Down, Courtney Crimsen, Marcus Cole, Zach Dempsey, Ryan Shaver, Sheri Holland, Clay himself, Hannah herself, Bryce Walker, and school counselor Kevin Porter – and how those people are connected to her death.

In the second season, Hannah's parents sue the school district, during which Hannah's tapes are released online. The fallout from the events of the first season and the toll it has taken on the lives of Liberty High's students is further shown as new secrets about the subjects and their loved ones are revealed during the ensuing trial against the school.

The third season takes place eight months after the events of the second season. Ani Achola, a new student at Liberty High, narrates the season as Clay and his friends struggle to keep Tyler's attempted school shooting a secret and to help him in his recovery. Tensions rise among the tapes' subjects after Bryce is killed, with Clay as a suspect, and drastic measures are soon taken to protect each other. Concurrently with the present events of the season, Bryce's past actions and the person he has become in the aftermath of the release of Hannah's tapes are examined.

In the fourth and final season, Clay and his friends prepare to graduate from Liberty High. However, they struggle to keep the truth behind Bryce's death a secret and their deteriorating trust in each other threatens to unravel all of their personal secrets. Clay's mental health begins to deteriorate as he tries to keep everyone united, forcing him to face the traumas of his recent past, with the help of his therapist, Dr. Ellman.

== Cast and characters ==
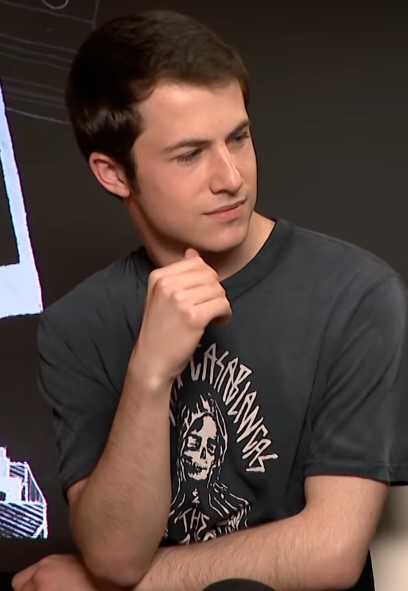
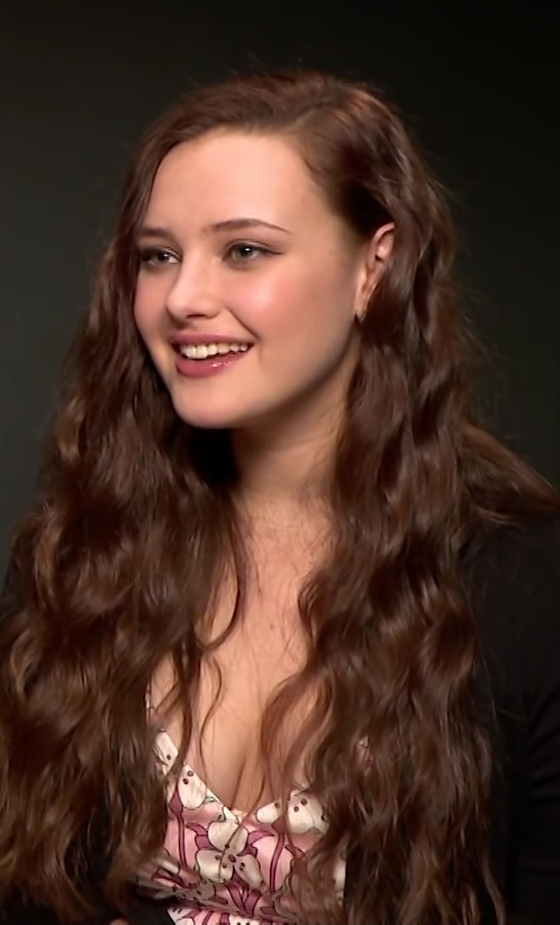
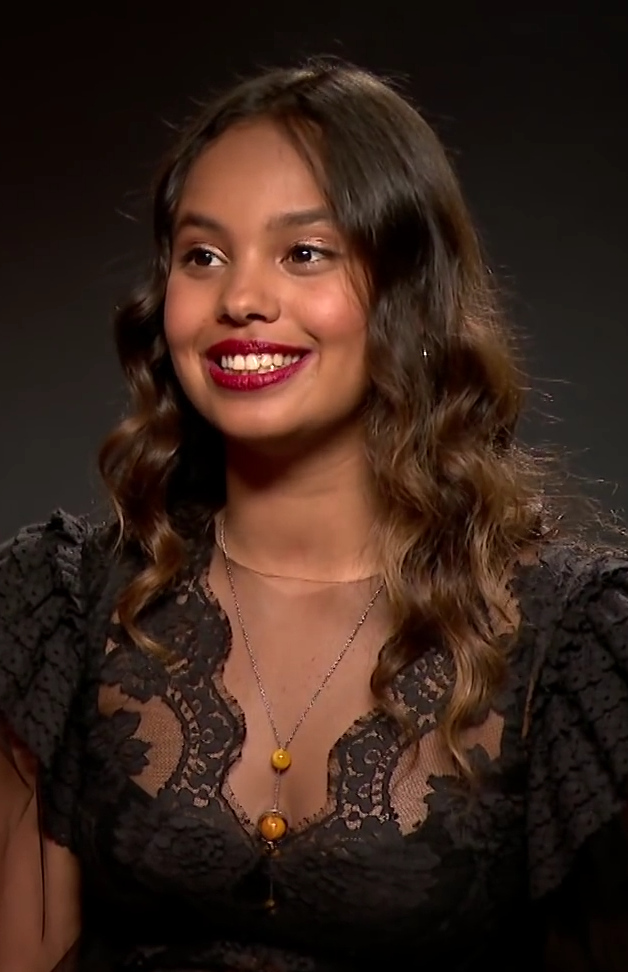
Dylan Minnette, Katherine Langford and Alisha Boe

=== Main ===
- Dylan Minnette as Clay Jensen, a student at Liberty High who had a crush on Hannah and becomes obsessed with finding out what drove her to end her life. At the end of the second season, he successfully talks Tyler out of committing a school shooting at the end-of-year dance and helps him escape the police. He is also the primary suspect in Bryce Walker's murder in the third season. His deteriorating mental health and subsequent recovery are a pivotal storyline in the fourth season.
- Katherine Langford as Hannah Baker (seasons 1–2), a new student at Liberty High who leaves behind a set of tapes detailing thirteen reasons why she killed herself.
- Christian Navarro as Tony Padilla, Clay's best friend at Liberty High who tries to help him deal with Hannah's death. Before her death, Hannah gives Tony the audio cassettes and holds him responsible for making sure everyone on the cassettes hears them. His family is deported in the third season after Bryce's father reports them to I.C.E.
- Alisha Boe as Jessica Davis, a student who starts attending Liberty High at the same time as Hannah. She is raped by Bryce before the events of the first season, which leads her to start a sexual assault survivors club on campus. She is elected student body president in the third season. Throughout the series, she is in an on-again, off-again relationship with Justin Foley. In season four, she has a final reconciliation with Justin, which lasts until his death later that season.
- Brandon Flynn as Justin Foley, a popular student at Liberty High who comes from an abusive family and is in a relationship with Jessica. He is responsible for setting the events of the series in motion by being the first person to humiliate Hannah, after their first date. He is initially Bryce's best friend and Clay's enemy until Justin breaks off his friendship with Bryce once he discovers Bryce sexually assaulted Jessica. At the end of the second season, Justin is adopted by Clay's parents and lives with Clay as his adoptive brother.
- Justin Prentice as Bryce Walker, a popular student from a rich family and the captain of the football team and pitcher on the baseball team at Liberty High. He is friends with Justin, Zach, and Monty but is revealed to be a serial rapist who sexually assaulted Jessica and Hannah, among others. He is killed by Alex who pushes him from a bridge after he is already severely injured from a brutal assault by Zach.
- Miles Heizer as Alex Standall, a student at Liberty High, who forms a close friendship with Jessica and Hannah, which ends when he and Jessica start dating. Alex is sarcastic and tends to be blunt but also cares about others. He kills Bryce in the third season by pushing him into the river after Zach leaves Bryce incapacitated. In the fourth season, he dates Winston Williams and Charlie St. George.
- Ross Butler as Zach Dempsey, a kindhearted friend of Justin and Bryce at Liberty High. After Bryce breaks his knee at the homecoming game and causes him to lose his college scholarships, Zach assaults Bryce at the river pier, breaking one of his legs and an arm.
- Devin Druid as Tyler Down, a shy, severely bullied student at Liberty High. He is an avid photographer, which often gets him into trouble, especially when he is caught taking stalker-like photos of female classmates, including Hannah. At the end of the second season, he is sexually assaulted by Monty while in the boys' bathroom of Liberty High, which leads to him attempting a school shooting at the Spring Fling before being talked out of it by Clay. His emotional recovery is a storyline in the third and fourth seasons.
- Amy Hargreaves as Lainie Jensen, Clay's attorney mother who works for the firm representing Liberty High in the Baker's lawsuit before she starts her own firm.
- Derek Luke as Kevin Porter (seasons 1–2; guest season 3), the guidance counselor at Liberty High. He is fired after giving his testimony in Hannah's trial in the second season. He is brought back in the third season to help the police interrogate the students in Bryce's murder investigation.
- Kate Walsh as Olivia Baker (seasons 1–2; guest season 3), Hannah's mother who runs a local pharmacy with her husband. Olivia is determined to uncover the truth about the events leading to her daughter's suicide. She divorces Andy and moves to New York between the second and third seasons.
- Brian d'Arcy James as Andy Baker (season 2; recurring season 1), Hannah's father who is the pharmacist in the pharmacy run by him and his wife. During Hannah's trial in the second season, he reveals that he had been cheating on Olivia when Hannah was alive, which Hannah discovered.
- Grace Saif as Ani Achola (seasons 3–4), a new Kenyan-British student at Liberty who lives in Bryce's house, due to her mother being his grandfather's caretaker. The third season is narrated through her conversation with Deputy Standall. Tensions rise when Clay and Jessica find out that Ani slept with Bryce, but she is nonetheless Jessica's best friend and Clay's girlfriend until the end of the fourth season.
- Brenda Strong as Nora Walker (season 3; recurring season 2; guest season 4), Bryce's mother. Although initially distant from her son, she takes a firmer stance with Bryce when he transfers schools to prevent him from repeating his mistakes. She pushes the police to investigate Clay in relation to Bryce's murder.
- Timothy Granaderos as Monty de la Cruz (seasons 3–4; recurring seasons 1–2), a vicious bully from an abusive family who is a student at Liberty High. He is friends with Bryce and is quick to anger. He is secretly gay and violently assaults Winston Williams, who is openly gay, after he kisses him at one of Bryce's parties, only to have sex with him later. He is killed in jail after being arrested for sexually assaulting Tyler. His father is homophobic and disowns him after learning that he is gay.
- Mark Pellegrino as Bill Standall (season 4, recurring seasons 1–3), a Crestmont deputy sheriff and Alex's father.
- Tyler Barnhardt as Charlie St. George (season 4; recurring season 3), a popular student at Liberty High who is friends with Monty but is kind at heart. During the fourth season, Charlie is revealed to be bisexual when he spends time with Clay's friends and develops feelings for Alex. He is the starting quarterback for Liberty in season four.
- Deaken Bluman as Winston Williams (season 4; recurring season 3), a former Hillcrest student who hooks up with Monty and is furious when Monty is posthumously accused of Bryce's murder, knowing Monty was not guilty because Winston was with him the night Bryce was murdered. He transfers to Liberty to investigate the case and get information for the police while dating Alex and falling in love with him. He drops the case after Alex tells him that he was the one who killed Bryce.
- Jan Luis Castellanos as Diego Torres (season 4), a charismatic, aggressive, and fiercely loyal leader of a divided football team struggling to understand the loss of one of their own.
- Gary Sinise as Dr. Robert Ellman (season 4), a compassionate, incisive, no-nonsense adolescent and family therapist who works to help Clay Jensen battle anxiety, depression and grief.

=== Recurring ===
==== Introduced in season one ====
- Josh Hamilton as Matt Jensen, a calm, reasonable college professor and Clay's father
- Michele Selene Ang as Courtney Crimsen (seasons 1–3, guest season 4), a closeted student at Liberty High who is responsible for spreading rumors about Hannah to protect the secret of her own sexual orientation. In the second season, she comes out on the stand during the trial of Hannah Baker, confessing her actions against Hannah that landed her on the tapes.
- Steven Silver as Marcus Cole (seasons 1–2), the self-centered student body president at Liberty High, who is responsible for humiliating and sexually harassing Hannah on a date. In the second season, he is suspended from school after lying on the stand during the trial and following the leaked release of the tapes soon after.
- Ajiona Alexus as Sheri Holland (seasons 1–2), a student and cheerleader at Liberty High who forms a bond with Clay but is also on the tapes when her actions result in Jeff's accidental death
- Tommy Dorfman as Ryan Shaver (seasons 1–2, guest season 4), a student at Liberty High who betrayed Hannah's trust
- Sosie Bacon as Skye Miller (seasons 1–2), an estranged friend of Clay. In the second season, Skye and Clay date for a while before she leaves for a "fresh start", following another self-harm incident which resulted in her bipolar disorder diagnosis.
- Brandon Larracuente as Jeff Atkins (season 1; guest season 2), a kind-hearted student at Liberty High and friend of Clay who died in a tragic car accident
- Steven Weber as Gary Bolan, the principal at Liberty High
- Keiko Agena as Pam Bradley (season 1; guest season 2), the Communications teacher at Liberty High
- Joseph C. Phillips as Greg Davis (seasons 1–2, 4; guest season 3), a colonel in the United States Air Force and Jessica's father
- Andrea Roth as Noelle Davis (guest seasons 1, 4; recurring season 2), Jessica's mother
- Cindy Cheung as Karen Dempsey (seasons 1–2; guest season 3), Zach's widowed mother
- Anna Zavelson as May Dempsey (season 1; guest season 2), Zach's friendly younger sister
- Alex MacNicoll as Peter Standall, Alex's older brother (guest seasons 1–3; recurring season 4)
- Henry Zaga as Brad (season 1), Tony's boyfriend. In the second season, it is revealed that the couple broke up sometime between the events of the first and second seasons.
- Giorgia Whigham as Kat (season 1), a friend of Hannah and her former next-door neighbor, Justin's girlfriend.
- Robert Gant as Todd Crimsen (season 1; guest seasons 2, 4), one of Courtney's fathers
- Alex Quijano as Steve Crimsen (guest seasons 1–2, 4), one of Courtney's fathers
- Wilson Cruz as Dennis Vasquez (guest season 1; seasons 2–3), the attorney representing Hannah's parents
- Ross Turner as Mr. Wood (seasons 1, 3–4), Liberty High School math teacher
- Matthew Alan as Seth Massey (seasons 1–3), a drug dealer and Justin's mother's live-in boyfriend, who is abusive toward Justin
- Jackie Geary as Amber Foley (seasons 1–2), Justin's mother, a drug addict who dies in the fourth season due to drug overdose
- Tom Everett Scott as Mr. Down (seasons 1–2; guest season 3), Tyler's father
- Maria Dizzia as Mrs. Down (guest season 1; season 2–3), Tyler's mother
- Kimiko Gelman as Jane Childs (seasons 1–2; guest season 3), the vice-principal at Liberty High
- Brittany Perry-Russell as Tracy Porter (guest season 1; recurring season 2), Mr. Porter's wife
- Gary Perez as Arturo Padilla (seasons 1, 3; guest season 4), Tony's father
- Dorian Lockett as Patrick (season 1; guest season 2), the basketball coach and history teacher at Liberty High

==== Introduced in season two ====
- Parminder Nagra as Priya Singh (guest seasons 2, 4; recurring season 3), the school counselor who replaces Mr. Porter at Liberty High
- Anne Winters as Chlöe Rice, a smart, popular girl at Liberty High and the new head cheerleader who is also Bryce's girlfriend. At the end of the second season, it is revealed that she is pregnant but she later undergoes an abortion.
- Jake Weber as Barry Walker (season 2; guest season 3), Bryce's father
- Austin Aaron as Luke Holliday (recurring seasons 2–4), a quarterback at Liberty High and best friends with Diego Torres. He is a jock who gets caught for using steroids.
- Meredith Monroe as Carolyn Standall, Alex's mother
- R.J. Brown as Caleb, Tony's boxing trainer and boyfriend
- Bryce Cass as Cyrus, an edgy, cynical mischief maker who serves as an unexpected champion of the downtrodden. He befriends Tyler and the two together embark on smear campaigns against bullies.
- Chelsea Alden as Mackenzie (seasons 2–3), Cyrus' sister, an artsy and witty girl who is not afraid to speak her mind. In the second season, she briefly develops a relationship with Tyler, though the latter breaks it up.
- Allison Miller as Sonya Struhl (season 2), a smart and ambitious young litigator, who defends the school during the Hannah Baker trial
- Brandon Butler as Scott Reed (seasons 2, 4), a student at Liberty High who is on the baseball team
- Samantha Logan as Nina Jones (season 2), a well-respected track star who befriends Jessica over shared sexual assault pasts
- Kelli O'Hara as Jackie (season 2), a passionate advocate for victims of bullying
- Ben Lawson as Rick Wlodimierz (season 2), the baseball coach at Liberty High, who supports and protects his players
- Keon Motakhaveri as Chad Moore, one of Cyrus' friends
- Spencer Moore II as Michael (season 2), one of Nina's friends
- James Cretan as Eric Cox, one of Cyrus' friends
- Mason Guccione as Toby Fletcher, one of Cyrus' friends
- Mikko Edwards as Jada (season 2), a cheerleader at Liberty High

==== Introduced in season three ====
- Bex Taylor-Klaus as Casey Ford (season 3), a member of HO and Jessica's friend, though they often clash
- Hart Denton as Dean Holbrook (season 3), a student at Hillcrest who does not like Bryce
- Nana Mensah as Amara Josephine Achola (season 3, guest season 4), Ani's strict mother and the Walker's nurse and housekeeper
- Benito Martinez as Sheriff Diaz, the head police officer in Bryce's murder case.
- Marcus DeAnda as Mr. de la Cruz (season 3), Monty and Estela's abusive father
- Raymond J. Barry as Harrison Chatham (season 3), Nora's sick father and Bryce's grandfather
- YaYa Gosselin as Graciella Padilla, Tony's younger sister (guest seasons 3–4)
- Christine Flores as Rosa Padilla, Tony's mother (season 3)
- Brandon Scott as J. J. Kerba, a football coach at Liberty High, who is hard on the players to get them to shape up
- Ron Rogge as Morris, the head football coach at Liberty High
- Blake Webb as Tim Pozzi (season 3), a drug dealer who sells cheap steroids at the local gym

==== Introduced in season four ====
- Inde Navarrette as Estela de la Cruz, Monty's younger sister
- Reed Diamond as Hansen Foundry, the Dean of Discipline at Liberty High School
- Yadira Guevara-Prip as Valerie Diaz, the daughter of police chief Diaz
- Matt Passmore as Ted Wynn, a police officer who takes an interest in Tony and his boxing abilities

== Episodes ==
Season	Episodes	Originally released
1	13	March 31, 2017
2	13	May 18, 2018
3	13	August 23, 2019
4	10	June 5, 2020

== Background and production ==
=== Development ===
Universal Studios purchased film rights to the novel on February 8, 2011, with Selena Gomez cast to play Hannah Baker. On October 29, 2015, it was announced that Netflix would be making a television adaptation of the book with Gomez instead serving as an executive producer. Tom McCarthy was hired to direct the first two episodes. The series was produced by Anonymous Content and Paramount Television with Gomez, McCarthy, Joy Gorman, Michael Sugar, Steve Golin, Mandy Teefey, and Kristel Laiblin serving as executive producers.

On May 7, 2017, it was announced that Netflix had renewed the series for a second season, which was released on May 18, 2018.

On June 6, 2018, Netflix renewed the series for a third season, which was released on August 23, 2019. It was dedicated to executive producer Steve Golin (founder and CEO of Anonymous Content), who died of Ewing's sarcoma on April 21, 2019, four months before the third season's release.

On August 1, 2019, it was announced that the series had been renewed for a fourth and final season, which was released on June 5, 2020.

=== Casting ===
In June 2016, Dylan Minnette, Katherine Langford, Christian Navarro, Alisha Boe, Brandon Flynn, Justin Prentice, Miles Heizer, Ross Butler, Devin Druid and Brian d'Arcy James were cast as the main leads. In September, Amy Hargreaves, Kate Walsh and Derek Luke were cast. Langford exited the show after the second season.

In August 2017, Jake Weber, Meredith Monroe, R. J. Brown, Anne Winters, Bryce Cass, Chelsea Alden, Allison Miller, Brandon Butler, Samantha Logan, Kelli O'Hara, and Ben Lawson were cast for season two.

In September 2018, Timothy Granaderos and Brenda Strong were promoted to series regulars for season 3 after recurring in the previous seasons. On September 5, 2019, Gary Sinise was cast as a series regular for the fourth season. On February 11, 2020, Jan Luis Castellanos joined the cast as a series regular for the fourth season.

=== Filming ===
Filming for the series took place in the Northern Californian towns of Vallejo, Benicia, San Rafael, Crockett, Sebastopol, and Martinez during the summer of 2016. The 13-episode first season and the special were released on Netflix on March 31, 2017. Therapy dogs were present on set for the actors because of the intense and emotional content of the series.

Filming for the second season began on June 12, 2017, but was briefly halted in October in response to the then-ongoing Northern California wildfires happening around the areas where the series was being filmed. Production on the second season wrapped in December 2017. The second season was released on May 18, 2018.

Filming for the third season began on August 12, 2018, but was halted due to another wildfire until December 17. Filming was scheduled to be completed on February 6, 2019.

The fourth season began filming in July 2019 and finished that December.

== Release ==
The first season was released on Netflix on March 31, 2017. It received positive reviews, which praised its subject matter and acting, particularly the performances of Minnette and Langford. For her performance, Langford received a Golden Globe Award nomination for Best Actress – Television Series Drama. However, its graphic depiction of issues such as suicide and rape (along with other mature content) prompted concerns from mental health professionals. In response, Netflix added a warning card and from March 2018 on, a video plays at the start of each season warning viewers about its themes. In July 2019, Netflix edited out the suicide scene in the first season's final episode.

Netflix renewed 13 Reasons Why for a second season in May 2017 due to the success of the initial 13 episodes; filming of the second season began the next month and concluded that December. The second season was released on May 18, 2018. Coinciding with the release of the second season, Netflix released a video with the cast that cautioned viewers on some of the topics covered in the show and provided a support website with crisis numbers for people affected by depression, anxiety and other mental health issues. A third season was ordered in June 2018 and was released on August 23, 2019. In August 2019, the series had been renewed for a fourth and final season, which premiered on June 5, 2020. Critical and audience reaction to the series has been divided, with the program generating controversy between audiences and industry reviewers alongside acquiring a loyal following.

== Reception ==
=== Critical response ===
Critical response of 13 Reasons Why
Season	Rotten Tomatoes	Metacritic
1	77% (65 reviews)	76 (17 reviews)
2	28% (53 reviews)	49 (16 reviews)
3	11% (18 reviews)	23 (4 reviews)
4	25% (12 reviews)	—N/a

On the review aggregator website Rotten Tomatoes, the series has an average rating of 35%. On Metacritic, the weighted average rating for all seasons except the last one is 60 out of 100, based on 38 critic reviews, indicating "mixed or average reviews".

==== Season 1 ====
Rotten Tomatoes reports that 77% of 65 critic reviews are positive for the first season, and the average rating is 7.1/10. The website's critical consensus reads, "13 Reasons Why complements its bestselling source material with a gripping look at adolescent grief whose narrative maturity belies its YA milieu." Metacritic assigned a score of 76 out of 100, based on 17 critics, indicating generally favorable reviews.

Jesse Schedeen of IGN praised 13 Reasons Why, giving it a 9.2 out of 10, stating that the series is "a very powerful and hard-hitting series" and "ranks among the best high school dramas of the 21st century". Matthew Gilbert of The Boston Globe gave a glowing review for the series, saying, "The drama is sensitive, consistently engaging, and, most importantly, unblinking." Maureen Ryan of Variety asserts that the series "is undoubtedly sincere, but it's also, in many important ways, creatively successful" and called it "simply essential viewing". Leah Greenblatt of Entertainment Weekly gave the entire season a score of B+, calling the series "a frank, authentically affecting portrait of what it feels like to be young, lost and too fragile for the world". Daniel Feinberg of The Hollywood Reporter also praised the series, calling it "an honorably mature piece of young-adult adaptation", and citing its performances, direction, relevance, and maturity as some of the series' strongest points.

The acting, particularly that of Katherine Langford as Hannah and Dylan Minnette as Clay, was frequently praised in reviews. Schedeen of IGN praised the cast, particularly Minnette and Langford, stating: "Langford shines in the lead role ... [and] embodies that optimism and that profound sadness [of Hannah's] as well. Minnette's Clay is, by design, a much more stoic and reserved character ... and does a fine job in what's often a difficult role." Gilbert of The Boston Globe praised the chemistry of Langford and Minnette, saying that "watching these two young actors together is pure pleasure", while Schedeen of IGN also agreed, saying that they are "often at their best together, channeling just the right sort of warm but awkward chemistry you'd expect from two teens who can't quite admit to their feelings for one another". Feinberg of The Hollywood Reporter also praises both actors: "Langford's heartbreaking openness makes you root for a fate you know isn't possible. The actress' performance is full of dynamic range, setting it against Minnette's often more complicated task in differentiating between moods that mostly go from uncomfortable to gloomy to red-eyed, hygiene-starved despair."

Ryan of Variety also gave praise to not only the two leads but also the supporting cast of actors, particularly Kate Walsh's performance as Hannah's mother, which Ryan describes as "career-best work". Positive mentions from various critics, such as Ryan, Feinberg and Schedeen, were also given to the supporting cast of actors (most particularly Alisha Boe, Miles Heizer and Christian Navarro's respective performances as Jessica, Alex and Tony). Liz Shannon Miller of Indiewire, who enjoyed the series and gave it a positive score of B+, gave praise to the racial, gender, and complex diversity of its supporting cast of teens.

Another aspect frequently mentioned within reviews was the series's mature and emotional approach to its dark and adult subject matter. This was favorably reviewed by critics, such as Miller of Indiewire, particularly her statement that "the adult edges to this story ring with honesty and truth." Miller, and Feinberg of The Hollywood Reporter, also stated that the series can be difficult to watch at times, while Schedeen of IGN states that it is "an often depressing and even uncomfortable show to watch ... a pretty emotionally draining experience, particularly towards the end as the pieces really start to fall into place."

Critics also praised several other aspects of the series. Feinberg highlighted the series' directors, saying: "A Sundance-friendly gallery of directors including Tom McCarthy, Gregg Araki and Carl Franklin keeps the performances grounded and the extremes from feeling exploitative", while Gilbert of The Boston Globe praised the storytelling: "The storytelling techniques are powerful ... [as it] builds on the world established in the previous hour, as we continually encounter new facets of Hannah's life and new characters. The background on the show keeps getting deeper, richer."

Conversely, the series has also received criticism over its portrayal of teen angst. Mike Hale of The New York Times wrote a critical review, writing, "the show doesn't make [Hannah's] downward progress convincing. It too often feels artificial, like a very long public service announcement." He also criticized the plot device that has Clay listening to the tapes one by one instead of all in one sitting like the other teens did, which Hale felt was unbelievable: "It makes no sense as anything but a plot device, and you'll find yourself, like Clay's antagonists, yelling at him to listen to the rest of tapes already."

Writing for The Guardian, Rebecca Nicholson praised some aspects of the series, including the performances from Minnette and Walsh but was troubled by much of the plot, writing, "a storyline that suggests the love of a sweet boy might have sorted all this out added to an uneasy feeling that stayed with me". Nicholson was skeptical that the series would appeal to older viewers, unlike other series set in high school such as Freaks and Geeks and My So-Called Life: "It lacks the crossover wit of its forebears ... It's too tied up in conveying the message that terrible behaviour can have horrible consequences to deal in any subtleties or shades of feeling. It's largely one-note – and that note is horrifying. 'It has to get better,' implores one student towards the end, but given its fairly open ending, an apparent season two setup, it does not seem as if there's much chance of that happening."

The Washington Post television critic Hank Stuever wrote a negative review, finding 13 Reasons Why "contrived" and implausible: "There are 13 episodes lasting 13 super-sullen hours – a passive-aggressive, implausibly meandering, poorly written, and awkwardly acted effort that is mainly about miscommunication, delivering no more wisdom or insight about depression, bullying, and suicide than one of those old ABC Afterschool Specials people now mock for being so corny." He also wrote that he found Hannah's suicide tapes "a protracted example of the teenager who fantasizes how everyone will react when she's gone. The story ... strikes me as remarkably, even dangerously, naive in its understanding of suicide, up to and including a gruesome, penultimate scene of Hannah opening her wrists in a bathtub."

David Wiegand of the San Francisco Chronicle gave the series a tepid review, saying that it was plagued by character inconsistencies, particularly in Hannah's character. He praised Langford's "stunning performance" but noted, "There are times when we simply don't believe the characters, when what they do or say isn't consistent with who we've been led to believe they are ... At times, [Hannah] is self-possessed and indifferent at best to the behavior of the popular kids. At other times, though, relatively minor misperceived slights seem to send her into an emotional tailspin. No doubt, teenagers embody a constant whirl of conflicting emotions, but the script pushes the bounds of credibility here and there." He noted that overall, the series worked: "The structure is gimmicky and the characters inconsistent, but there are still at least 13 Reasons Why the series is worthy."

==== Season 2 ====
The second season received generally mixed reviews from critics, with criticism aimed at the writing; many declared the season unnecessary and boring. On Rotten Tomatoes, 28% of 53 reviews are positive, with an average rating of 5.3/10. The site's critical consensus states, "By deviating from its source material, 13 Reasons Why can better explore its tenderly crafted characters; unfortunately, in the process, it loses track of what made the show so gripping in the first place." On Metacritic, the season has an average score of 49 out of 100, based on 16 critics, indicating "mixed or average reviews".

Catherine Pearson from Digital Spy wrote a negative review, calling the season "even more problematic" than the first. She ends the review saying that, "Unrelenting depression seems to shroud the season, briefly lifted only to collapse back down as the show's thirteenth episode, once again, delivers a deeply disturbing scene of suffering." Jordan Davidson from The Mighty wrote that he "felt sick" after watching the final episode of the season.

A scene in which the character Tyler Down (Devin Druid) is attacked and sexually assaulted with a mop handle by bully Montgomery De La Cruz (Timothy Granaderos) during the finale also caused controversy from fans and critics of the series, with some describing it as "unnecessary" and "traumatizing". Series showrunner Brian Yorkey defended the scene, saying that it was included in an attempt to "tell truthful stories about things that young people go through in as unflinching a way as we can".

==== Season 3 ====
The third season was met with overwhelmingly negative reviews, with criticism aimed at the screenplay for poor execution of its topics, including the rape of Tyler in the final episode of the previous season, the new character of Ani, the sympathetic redemption of Bryce, genre changing from drama to mystery, and the conclusion. However, the technical aspects and the performances received some praise.

Rotten Tomatoes reports that 11% of 18 reviews are positive, and the average rating is 1.4/10. The site's critical consensus reads: "13 Reasons Why attempts to break away from its first two seasons only to become a melodramatic mess of a murder mystery." On Metacritic, the season has an average score of 23 out of 100, based on 4 critics, indicating "generally unfavourable reviews".

==== Season 4 ====
Like the previous two seasons, the fourth and final season also received negative reviews. The writing and story remained the primary criticized aspects, while the ending was met with a divided reception.

On Rotten Tomatoes, 25% of 12 reviews are positive, with an average rating of 5.3/10. The site's critical consensus states: "13 Reasons Why closes with a chaotic final chapter that betrays what little dignity remained in the tragic lives of its central teens." Episode six, in which the school runs a "drill" where the students are made to believe there is an active shooter was heavily criticized, with many fans and critics describing the episode as "too realistic" due to the prevalence of school shootings in the United States and "triggering" and "traumatizing" although some reviewers noted that the show had tackled a topic that was relevant to many American school students. The storyline of Justin Foley being diagnosed with and killed by complications of AIDS also generated controversy, with many calling it "unfair"; the inaccurate depiction of the illness's progression was also criticized by viewers. Minnette defended the decision, saying that he and Brandon Flynn had pushed showrunner Brian Yorkey to kill off Justin, as they "both felt that it would have the biggest emotional impact on the series as Justin had the most emotional impact out of all of the characters".

=== Audience viewership ===
The marketing analytics firm Jumpshot determined the first season was the second-most viewed Netflix season in the first 30 days after it premiered, garnering 48 percent of the viewers that the second season of Daredevil received, which was the most viewed season according to Jumpshot. The series also showed an 18 percent increase in week-over-week viewership from week one to week two. Jumpshot, which "analyzes click-stream data from an online panel of more than 100 million consumers", looked at the viewing behavior and activity of the company's U.S. members, factoring in the relative number of U.S. Netflix viewers who watched at least one episode of the season. According to Nielsen, the premiere episode of the second season drew 6.08 million viewers in the U.S. in the first three days of its release. It also revealed that a significant part of its audience were young – aged 34 or younger (75%) – and female (65%) – with males representing 35 percent of viewers. The second season became the eighth most watched English-language television series on Netflix, with 496.1 million hours viewed.

=== Awards and nominations ===
Year	Award	Category	Nominee(s)	Result	Ref.
2018	Artios Awards	Television Pilot & First Season — Drama	Kerry Barden, Paul Schnee, Barbara Fiorentino, Nina Henninger, Joey Montenarello, Terese Classen	Nominated	
2018	Golden Globe Awards	Best Actress – Television Series Drama	Katherine Langford	Nominated	
2018	Guild of Music Supervisors Awards	Best Music Supervision in a Television Drama	Season Kent	Won	
2018	Imagen Awards	Best Actor – Television	Christian Navarro	Nominated	
2018	MTV Movie & TV Awards	Best Show	13 Reasons Why	Nominated	
2018	MTV Movie & TV Awards	Best Performance in a Show	Katherine Langford	Nominated	
2018	NAACP Image Awards	Outstanding Directing in a Drama Series	Carl Franklin for "Tape 5, Side B"	Won	
2018	People's Choice Awards	The Bingeworthy Show of 2018	13 Reasons Why	Nominated	
2018	People's Choice Awards	The Drama Show of 2018	13 Reasons Why	Nominated	
2018	People's Choice Awards	The Drama TV Star of 2018	Katherine Langford	Nominated	
2018	People's Choice Awards	The Show of 2018	13 Reasons Why	Nominated	
2018	Satellite Awards	Best Actress in a Drama / Genre Series	Katherine Langford	Nominated	
2018	Satellite Awards	Best Drama Series	13 Reasons Why	Nominated	
2018	Television Academy Honors	Television with a Conscience	13 Reasons Why	Won	
2019	Guild of Music Supervisors Awards	Best Music Supervision in a Television Drama	Season Kent	Nominated	

== Concerns over depictions of depression and suicide ==
The release of the show caused public concern about the risk of suicide contagion among teenagers, particularly in those who have suicidal thoughts. The portrayal of sensitive content such as teen suicide, self-harm, rape and bullying raised criticism, especially for its graphic content, primarily the scene in which Hannah kills herself. Some researchers and medical professionals argue that the series violated guidelines for depicting suicide in the media and might trigger "imitative" behaviors among high school students and vulnerable people.

Prior to the series' release, scholars had studied the influence of the media on suicide for decades. Evidence to support the existence of a relationship between fictional media exposure and suicide behaviors remained weak and a strict causality had never been established. The effect that fiction can have on suicidal thoughts and behaviors is probably smaller than that of other psychological and social risk factors for suicide. It has been argued that censoring fiction may do more harm than good.

After the series' release, a study published in the Journal of the American Academy of Child and Adolescent Psychiatry found that suicide among teenagers rose by 28.9 percent in the month after Netflix launched the show.

=== Criticism ===
Several health professionals, educators and advocates linked the show to self-harm and suicide threats among young people. This community also expressed major concerns about the series romanticizing suicide, not providing adequate resources at the conclusion of each episode, targeting a young vulnerable audience, and painting mental health professionals as unhelpful and not worth seeing. Mental health experts are also educating the general public on what to do in the situations Hannah Baker goes through, disseminating accurate information surrounding teen suicide, depression, and youth that experience traumatic events through research surrounding the show and mental health resources for help-seeking youth.

The release of 13 Reasons Why corresponded with between 900,000 and 1.5 million more suicide-related Google searches in the United States, including a 26 percent increase in searches for "how to commit suicide", an 18 percent increase for "commit suicide", and a 9 percent increase for "how to kill yourself". After an initial spike in calls to the Crisis Text Line after the first episode, there was an overall reduction in crisis call volume for the remainder of the series. Although the link between searching for suicide information and suicide risk is unclear, increases in self-harm admissions to one children's hospital were observed.

The Australian youth mental health service for 12–25 year-olds, Headspace, issued a warning in late April 2017 over the graphic content featured in the series, due to the increased number of calls to the service following the series' release in the country. However, Netflix demonstrably complied with the Australian viewer ratings system by branding the series as "MA15+" when streamed via its own interface. They accompanied its presentation with additional warnings and viewer advice, and ensured that counselling referrals were included and not easily skipped at the conclusion of each episode. Each warning voice over is read by a different cast member at the end of the episode, with Katherine Langford reading in her native Australian accent in her voice-overs.

In response to the graphic nature of the series and New Zealand's high youth suicide rate, which was the highest among the 34 (Note: The 2009–2012 data exclude Latvia, which became the 35th OECD member country on July 1, 2016.) OECD countries during 2009 to 2012, the Office of Film & Literature Classification in the country created a new rating, "RP18", allowing individuals aged 18 and over to watch the series alone and those below having to watch it with supervision from a parent or guardian.

In April 2017, the National Association of School Psychologists (NASP) in the United States released a statement regarding the series, saying: "Research shows that exposure to another person's suicide, or to graphic or sensationalized accounts of death, can be one of the many risk factors that youth struggling with mental health conditions cite as a reason they contemplate or attempt suicide." NASP sent a letter to school mental health professionals across the country about the series, reportedly a first for NASP in response to a television series. The following month, the United States Society of Clinical Child and Adolescent Psychology (SCCAP) released a statement also noting how strongly the series may serve as a trigger for self-injury among vulnerable youth. They lamented the depiction of mental health professionals as ineffective for youth who have experienced trauma and may have been considering suicide.

Similarly, clinical psychologists such as Daniel J. Reidenberg and Erika Martinez, as well as mental health advocate MollyKate Cline of Teen Vogue magazine, have expressed concerns regarding the risk of suicide contagion. However, Eric Beeson, a counselor at The Family Institute at Northwestern University noted that "it's unlikely that one show alone could trigger someone to attempt suicide." Mental health professionals have also criticized the series' depiction of suicide itself, much of which violates widely promulgated recommendations for reporting on actual suicides or not depicting them in fiction, in order to not encourage copycat suicides. The season finale, which depicts Hannah's suicide in graphic detail, has been particularly criticized in this regard. Nic Sheff, a writer for the series, has defended it as intended to dispel the myth that suicides "quietly drift off", and recalled how he himself was deterred from a suicide attempt by recalling a survivor's account of how painful and horrifying it was.

The NASP statement also criticized the series' suggestion that bullying alone led Hannah to take her life, noting that while it may be a contributing factor, suicide far more often results from the bullied person having a "treatable mental illness and overwhelming or intolerable stressors", along with a lack of adequate coping mechanisms. Alex Moen, a school counselor in Minneapolis, took issue with the series' entire plotline as "essentially a fantasy of what someone who is considering suicide might have—that once you commit suicide, you can still communicate with your loved ones, and people will suddenly realize everything that you were going through and the depth of your pain ... That the cute, sensitive boy will fall in love with you and seek justice for you, and you'll be able to orchestrate it, and in so doing kind of still be able to live." Other counselors criticized the depiction of Hannah's attempt to reach out to Mr. Porter as dangerously misleading, since not only does he miss obvious signs of her suicidal ideations but says he cannot report her sexual assault to the police without her identifying the assailant. School counselors are often portrayed as ineffective or clueless in popular culture, Moen says, but Porter's behavior in the series goes beyond that, to being unethical and possibly illegal. "It's ridiculous! Counselors are not police. We don't have to launch an investigation. We bring whatever information we do have to the police", she told Slate.

In May 2017, the Canadian Mental Health Association (CMHA) along with the Centre for Suicide Prevention (CSP) released a statement with similar concerns to the ones raised by NASP. CMHA believed that the series may glamorize suicide, and that some content may lead to distress in viewers, particularly in younger viewers. Furthermore, the portrayal of Hannah's suicide does not follow the media guidelines as set out by the Canadian Association for Suicide Prevention (CASP) and the American Association of Suicidology. CMHA and CASP did praise the series for raising awareness about "this preventable health concern," adding that, "Raising awareness needs to be done in a safe and responsible manner. A large and growing body of Canadian and international research has found clear links between increases in suicide rates and harmful media portrayals of suicide." Ways in which the portrayals of suicide may cause harm, according to CMHA and CASP, include the following: "They may simplify suicide, such as, by suggesting that bullying alone is the cause; they may make suicide seem romantic, such as, by putting it in the context of a Hollywood plot line; they may portray suicide as a logical or viable option; they may display graphic representations of suicide which may be harmful to viewers, especially young ones; and/or they may advance the false notion that suicides are a way to teach others a lesson." A 2019 study in the Journal of the American Academy of Child and Adolescent Psychiatry found that the overall suicide rate among 10- to 17-year-olds increased by 28.9 percent in April 2017, the month immediately following the release of the first season. The study examined monthly suicide rates for that age range from January 2013 through December 2017, and the rate observed in April 2017 "was the highest monthly suicide rate of any month during the 5-year study period".

=== Netflix response ===
Netflix responded to the criticism surrounding the series by adding strong advisory warnings prior to the ninth, twelfth, and thirteenth episodes in the first season, the first two due to rape and the last due to the suicide scene. In July 2019, before the release of season three, Netflix edited the suicide scene of the first-season finale. Originally, the episode included a bloody depiction of Hannah slitting her wrists in a bathtub.

Executive producer Selena Gomez, in defense of the controversy surrounding the series, stated:

We stayed very true to the book and that's initially what Jay Asher created was a beautifully tragic, complicated yet suspenseful story and I think that's what we wanted to do ... We wanted to do it justice and yeah the backlash is gonna come no matter what. It's not an easy subject to talk about, but I'm very fortunate with how it's doing.

== Beyond the Reasons ==
With the release of the first season of the series, Netflix also released 13 Reasons Why: Beyond the Reasons, an aftershow documentary television film. The 29-minute documentary featured the cast and crew of the series and mental health professionals discussing their experiences working on the series and dealing with different issues including bullying, depression and sexual assault. Two more Beyond the Reasons specials were released with the second and third seasons respectively.

Season	Episodes	Originally released
1	1	March 31, 2017
2	1	May 18, 2018
3	1	August 23, 2019

=== Season 1 (2017) ===
No. overall	No. in season	Title	Original release date
1	1	"Beyond the Reasons Season 1"	March 31, 2017

=== Season 2 (2018) ===
No. overall	No. in season	Title	Original release date
2	1	"Beyond the Reasons Season 2"	May 18, 2018

=== Season 3 (2019) ===
No. overall	No. in season	Title	Original release date
3	1	"Beyond the Reasons Season 3"	August 23, 2019

== Soundtrack ==
Compilation soundtracks have been released for the first three seasons, as well as score albums featuring the show's original score by Eskmo.

=== Season 1 ===
13 Reasons Why (A Netflix Original Series Soundtrack)

Soundtrack album by Various artists
- Released: March 30, 2017
- Genres: Indie rock; synthpop; new wave
- Length: 52:21
- Label: Interscope

Singles from 13 Reasons Why (A Netflix Original Series Soundtrack)
- 1. "Bored" Released: March 30, 2017; 2. "The Killing Moon" Released: April 21, 2017

13 Reasons Why (A Netflix Original Series Soundtrack) track listing
No.	Title	Artist(s)	Length
1.	"Only You"	Selena Gomez	3:04
2.	"Kill Em with Kindness" (acoustic)	Selena Gomez	3:32
3.	"Bored"	Billie Eilish	3:00
4.	"Love Will Tear Us Apart"	Joy Division	3:26
5.	"Into the Black"	Chromatics	5:20
6.	"The Night We Met"	Lord Huron	3:26
7.	"A 1000 Times"	Hamilton Leithauser and Rostam	4:09
8.	"The Killing Moon"	Roman Remains	5:30
9.	"High"	Sir Sly	3:51
10.	"Cool Blue"	The Japanese House	3:51
11.	"Fascination Street" (remastered)	The Cure	5:14
12.	"The Walls Came Down" (single version)	The Call	4:09
13.	"The Stand" (long version)	The Alarm	4:09

=== Season 2 ===
13 Reasons Why: Season 2 (A Netflix Original Series Soundtrack)

Soundtrack album by Various artists
- Released: May 18, 2018
- Length: 72:17
- Label: Interscope

Singles from 13 Reasons Why: Season 2 (A Netflix Original Series Soundtrack)
- 1. "Lovely" Released: April 19, 2018; 2. "Back to You" Released: May 10, 2018; 3. "Start Again" Released: May 15, 2018; 4. "The Night We Met" Released: December 14, 2018

13 Reasons Why: Season 2 (A Netflix Original Series Soundtrack) track listing
No.	Title	Artist(s)	Length
1.	"Back to You"	Selena Gomez	3:30
2.	"Lovely"	Billie Eilish and Khalid	3:21
3.	"Start Again"	OneRepublic featuring Logic	2:45
4.	"Falling Skies"	Yungblud featuring Charlotte Lawrence	3:22
5.	"The Night We Met"	Lord Huron featuring Phoebe Bridgers	3:28
6.	"Tangled Up"	Parade of Lights	3:32
7.	"Time"	Colouring	3:24
8.	"My Kind of Love"	Leon Else	3:29
9.	"Your Love"	Haerts	3:45
10.	"Love Vigilantes"	New Order	4:21
11.	"The Killing Moon"	Echo and the Bunnymen	5:49
12.	"Promise Not to Fall"	Human Touch	3:28
13.	"Sanctify"	Years & Years	3:12
14.	"Tin Pan Boy"	Yungblud	3:11
15.	"Souvenir"	OMD	3:37
16.	"Watch Me Bleed"	Tears for Fears	4:17
17.	"Cities in Dust" (single version)	Siouxsie and the Banshees	4:06
18.	"Of Lacking Spectacle"	Gus Dapperton	3:24
19.	"Falling (In Dreams)"	Telekinesis	2:42
20.	"Strength"	The Alarm	3:34

=== Season 3 ===
13 Reasons Why: Season 3 (A Netflix Original Series Soundtrack)

Soundtrack album by Various artists
- Released: August 23, 2019
- Length: 63:50
- Label: Interscope

Singles from 13 Reasons Why: Season 3 (A Netflix Original Series Soundtrack)
- 1. "Fuck, I'm Lonely" Released: August 1, 2019; 2. "Another Summer Night Without You" Released: August 12, 2019; 3. "Teeth" Released: August 21, 2019; 4. "Die a Little" Released: October 30, 2019

13 Reasons Why: Season 3 (A Netflix Original Series Soundtrack) track listing
No.	Title	Artist(s)	Length
1.	"Teeth"	5 Seconds of Summer	3:24
2.	"Die a Little"	Yungblud	2:53
3.	"Fuck, I'm Lonely"	Lauv featuring Anne-Marie	3:19
4.	"Severed"	The Decemberists	4:03
5.	"Swim Home"	Cautious Clay	3:06
6.	"Another Summer Night Without You"	Alexander 23	2:38
7.	"Miss U"	Charli XCX	3:05
8.	"Favorite Drug"	Daydream Masi	3:29
9.	"Keeping It in the Dark"	Daya	3:28
10.	"Young Forever"	JR JR	4:04
11.	"All That"	Drama Relax featuring Jeremih	2:53
12.	"This Baby Don't Cry"	K.Flay	3:04
13.	"Walk Forever by My Side"	Twin Shadow	3:56
14.	"Slaves of Fear"	Health	4:53
15.	"All Your Life"	Angelo De Augustine	4:25
16.	"Culture"	Hembree	3:13
17.	"Still Want to Be Here"	Frightened Rabbit	3:52
18.	"Ordinary World"	Eskmo featuring White Sea	4:05

== See also ==
- Generation Z
- Me Too movement
- Millennials
