= Barbara Birdfeather =

American disc jockey and astrologer

Barbara Birdfeather (September 24, 1940 – April 26, 2009) was an American disc jockey, astrologer, musician and music journalist.

== Early life ==
Birdfeather was born in Mount Kisco, New York on 24 September 1940.

== Career ==
She began her career writing an astrology for magazines. In 1969 she was described by Time as "one of the brightest young astrologers" in Manhattan while writing for Eye. That year she published the book The Birdfeather Astrological Space Book. Possibly her most notable work during this period was her section named "The Bedside Astrologer" for Mademoiselle.

After moving to Los Angeles she worked for KMET, KPPC and KPFK as a disc jockey. In 1970 she collaborated with Louise Huebner, Alan Watts, Peter Hurkos and Anton LaVey on the album The Occult Explosion. She later served as publicist for musician Alex Harvey. In 1972 Birdfeather spoke on sex discrimination in the DJ profession with the Pacifica Foundation.

== Personal life ==
Birdfeather subscribed to New Age beliefs and thought that the universe could be split into ages. She held that the world had recently shifted into an "Aquarian age", defined by knowelege being transmitted electronically, from previously being in a "Piscean age", defined by Christ as the Fisher of Man.

Later in her life Birdfeather worked as a floral designer. She had one child, a daughter named Isabella, and a granddaughter trought her. Birdfeather died in her home in Hollywood on April 26, 2009, due to lung cancer. After her death her daughter claimed that Birdfeather revealed on her deathbed that her father was musician Bob Dylan.

== Works ==
- The Birdfeather Astrological Space Book: Tales of the Universe. Nash Publishing Corporation. 1969. ISBN 9780840211040.
