= Give Me All Your Love (disambiguation) =

"Give Me All Your Love" is a song by Whitesnake.

Give Me All Your Love or Gimme All Your Love may also refer to:

- "Give Me All Your Love" (Magic Affair song), 1994
- "Give Me All Your Love", a song by Alma Carroll that competed to represent Ireland in the Eurovision Song Contest 1968
- "Give Me All Your Love", a song by Ari Gold from Ari Gold
- "Give Me All Your Love", a song by The Continentals in the Island Records discography
- "Give Me All Your Love", a song by Carl Cox
- "Give Me All Your Love", a song by Exposé, B-side of the single "I'll Never Get Over You Getting Over Me"
- "Gimme All Your Love", a song by Alabama Shakes, 2015
- "Gimme All Your Love", a song by Alessandra Mirka Gatti recording as Sheela

== See also ==
- Give Me All Your Loving (disambiguation)
