= Spectrum Center =

Entertainment and sports venue located in center city Charlotte, North Carolina

- The Cable Box; The Hive

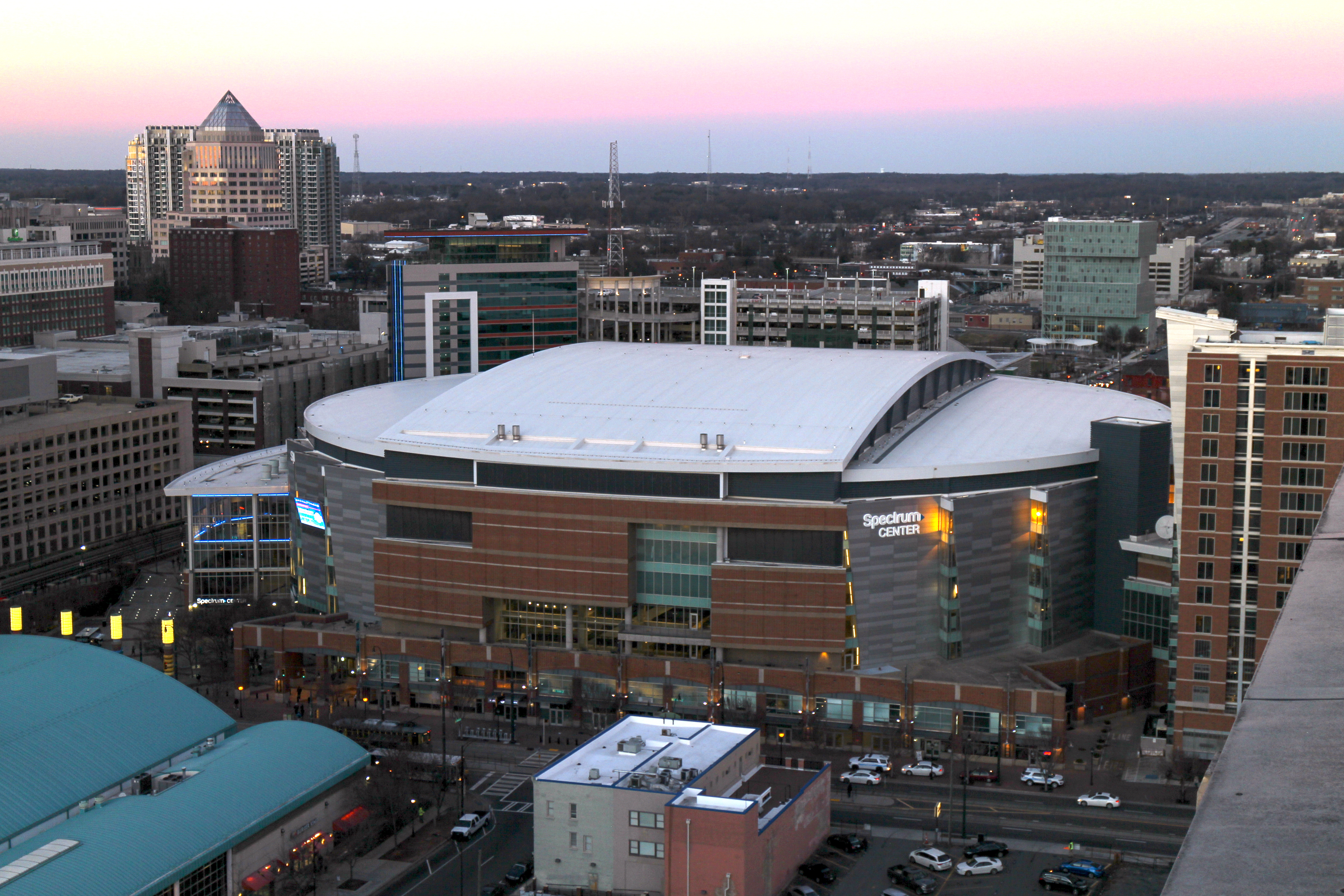
- Spectrum Center in 2018

- Location in North Carolina Location in the United States
- Former names: Charlotte Bobcats Arena (2005–2008); Time Warner Cable Arena (2008–2016)
- Address: 333 East Trade Street
- Location: Charlotte, North Carolina, U.S.
- Coordinates: 35°13′30″N 80°50′21″W
- Owner: City of Charlotte
- Operator: Hornets Sports & Entertainment
- Capacity: Basketball: 19,444 (expandable to 20,200); Pro wrestling: 20,200 Concerts: *End stage 180°: 13,376; *End stage 270°: 15,236; *End stage 360°: 18,249; *Center stage: 18,504; *Theatre: 4,000–7,000 Ice hockey: 14,100
- Surface: Multi-surface
- Public transit: CTC/Arena

Construction
- Groundbreaking: July 29, 2003
- Opened: October 21, 2005
- Renovated: 2016
- Cost: $260 million ($429 million in 2025 dollars)
- Architects: Ellerbe Becket; Odell Associates, Inc. The Freelon Group, Inc.
- Project manager: PC Sports
- General contractor: Hunt/R.J. Leeper

Tenants
- Charlotte Bobcats/Hornets (NBA) (2005–present); Charlotte Checkers (ECHL) (2005–2010); Charlotte Sting (WNBA) (2006); Charlotte Checkers (AHL) (2010–2015)

Website
- spectrumcentercharlotte.com

Spectrum Center is a multi-purpose indoor arena in Charlotte, North Carolina, United States. Located in Uptown, it is owned by the city of Charlotte and operated by its only current tenant, the Charlotte Hornets of the National Basketball Association (NBA). The arena seats 19,444 for NBA games, but can be expanded to 20,200 for college basketball games.

== History ==
The arena opened in October 2005 as Charlotte Bobcats Arena. The name was changed to Time Warner Cable Arena when the naming rights were purchased in 2008. When Charter Communications purchased Time Warner Cable in 2016, the name was again changed to reflect the Spectrum trade name.

The arena was originally intended to host the original Hornets franchise in the early 2000s. The Hornets' arena, Charlotte Coliseum, was considered outdated despite being only 13 years old, primarily owing to the arena only containing eight luxury suites, whereas the Palace of Auburn Hills, which opened the same year as the Coliseum, had 180.

In 2001, a non-binding public referendum for an arts package, which included money to build the new uptown arena, was placed on the ballot for voters; it was placed in order to demonstrate what was believed to be widespread public support for new arena construction. Polls showed the referendum on its way to passage until then-mayor Pat McCrory vetoed a living wage ordinance just days before the referendum. As a result, Helping Empower Local People, a grass-roots organization supporting a living wage, launched a campaign to oppose the arena, arguing that it was immoral for the city to build a new arena when city workers didn't earn enough to make a living. The referendum failed with 43% for building the arena and 57% opposed.

City leaders then devised a way to build a new arena that did not require voter support, but let it be known that they wouldn't consider building it unless then-Hornets' owner George Shinn sold the team. While even the NBA acknowledged that Shinn had alienated fans, NBA officials felt such a statement would anger other team owners. As it turned out, the NBA approved the Hornets' application to move to New Orleans. However, the league promised that the city would get a new team—which became the Bobcats—as part of the deal. The total cost of the arena to Charlotte and Mecklenburg County was not known, but estimated at $260 million. The construction was approved by the city council, which did not opt to present another referendum to the public.

The arena opened as the Charlotte Bobcats Arena on October 21, 2005, costing $265 million. Architects hoped the building would bring the city together, as its location and large outdoor plaza, among other features, would suggest. The building's concourses and open design, plus artwork throughout also suggests the concept of community and socializing. One major feature of the arena was its original center-hung scoreboard, which was not only the largest scoreboard in any NBA arena when it debuted, but also featured a one-of-a-kind light-up 360 degree 3D mural of the Charlotte skyline. In early 2006, the arena became the subject of controversy when the Bobcats charged a $15,000 fee to Charlotte-Mecklenburg Schools for graduation ceremonies held at the building. The fee was eventually waived following media attention from a local newspaper. Many high schools in the area moved graduations to Bojangles Coliseum.

As part of the deal, TWC shuttered its poorly-performing regional sports network C-SET (which was established to serve as the Bobcats' rightsholder) and allowed the team to negotiate a new deal with Fox Sports South to ensure wider distribution of its games. Following Charter Communications' purchase of TWC, the arena was renamed as the Spectrum Center, in accordance with Charter's trade name for its cable services.

=== Renovations ===
In September 2014, the Charlotte city council agreed to give the Hornets $34 million for arena renovations in preparation for the 2017 NBA All-Star Game. (However, the game was moved to New Orleans because of a controversial HB2 bill, but the Spectrum Center did host the 2019 NBA All-Star Game to make up for it.)

On January 24, 2015, the Hornets announced and unveiled images of a new scoreboard to be installed in summer 2016, costing $7 million. The board's screens measure out at 25' high by 42' wide and 18' high by 31' wide, approximately, making it almost twice the size of the original board and among the NBA's largest. The screens are able to handle 1080p resolution, something unique to the NBA. Two smaller "underbelly" screens would also be included. In addition, the scoreboard would be able to change colors and have a visible 'hive' motif built-in throughout its design. It was also announced that four retractable auxiliary scoreboards will be installed in the corners of the upper level and finally, 360° ribbon boards are scheduled to be installed as well. Construction was completed by the start of the 2016–17 NBA season. Also announced were plans for the renovation of the visitors locker room, suites, and other rooms. This marked the first major renovations to the Spectrum Center in its history.

The city proposed a $245 million renovation plan for both the arena and the area around it in early 2022. It included various internal upgrades to the arena such as new HVAC units, and the possibility of an outdoor space for entertainment similar to others found at NBA arenas. The biggest addition would be a separate new practice facility located across the street from the arena. In addition, the cost would also cover upgrades to the existing transit station where the new facility would be. City leaders approved the renovations, now priced at $275 million, in June 2022. Construction is expected to start in summer 2022 with a rough completion date in 2027.

== Major events ==
=== College basketball ===
As North Carolina is a hotbed for college basketball thanks to constant success among its major universities, it was expected that the arena would like the Coliseums before it, host high-profile and neutral-site NCAA basketball games, a legacy that continues today. Notable NCAA basketball games the Spectrum Center has hosted to date include:

- NCAA tournament (hosted by UNC Charlotte): 2008, 2011, 2015, 2018, 2024
  - The arena hosted the first ever 16–1 upset in the NCAA Tournament since the 64-team field was adopted. The UMBC Retrievers upset the Virginia Cavaliers 74–54 on March 16, 2018.
- ACC men's basketball tournament: 2008, 2019, 2025, 2026, 2028
- Southern Conference men's basketball tournament: 2010
- Central Intercollegiate Athletic Association (CIAA) men's and women's basketball tournaments: 2006–2020.
- The Charlotte 49ers basketball teams (who usually play on-campus at Dale F. Halton Arena) have played a few games at Spectrum Center since its opening, usually as a part of neutral site tournaments hosted in the Spectrum Center early in the season.

=== Mixed martial arts ===
On January 27, 2018, the arena hosted its first UFC event for UFC on Fox: Jacaré vs. Brunson 2. The promotion returned to the arena on May 13, 2023, for UFC on ABC: Rozenstruik vs. Almeida.

=== Other events ===
In 2012, the Spectrum Center hosted the Democratic National Convention. In 2016, the arena hosted the Kellogg's Tour of Gymnastics Champions. It was scheduled to host the 2017 NBA All-Star Game, but was removed as host on July 21, 2016, due to the league's opposition against North Carolina's Public Facilities Privacy & Security Act signed by then-Governor Pat McCrory. The league said consideration for Charlotte to host in 2019 would remain if the North Carolina State Legislature and current Governor Roy Cooper made changes to the act that were satisfactory to the league. On May 24, 2017, Charlotte and the arena were officially announced as hosts of the 2019 NBA All-Star Game. The arena was originally scheduled to host the 2020 Republican National Convention, but due to the COVID-19 pandemic the event was scaled back with Day 1 events taking place at the Charlotte Convention Center and the remainder of the convention being held virtually.

== Tenants ==
The Spectrum Center has had two other permanent tenants besides the Hornets.

The Charlotte Checkers of the ECHL vacated historic Bojangles' Coliseum to play in the new arena in fall 2005. When the ECHL Checkers gave way to an American Hockey League team with the same name, they remained at the arena. The arena's floor was just barely large enough to accommodate an NHL-size rink. As a result, much of the upper level was curtained off for Checkers games, reducing seating capacity for hockey to 14,100 in an asymmetrical seating configuration. Even then, many seats had poor sightlines; over 4,000 seats in the hockey configuration had obstructed views. Primarily because of those factors, on December 16, 2014, it was announced the Checkers would move back to Bojangles' Coliseum starting with the 2015–16 AHL season. Overall, both incarnations of the Checkers played 10 seasons at the arena.

The WNBA's Charlotte Sting moved with the then-Bobcats to the arena in 2005, becoming the building's third permanent tenant. However, they only played one season at their new home in 2006 before folding in early 2007. This was due to low attendance and a lack of on-court success.

== Entertainment ==
The arena is used for more than just sporting events. Musical acts, family productions and other events including concerts, circuses, and professional wrestling all perform there.

List of concerts and events at the arena
Artist	Event	Date	Opening Act
The 1975	Still... At Their Very Best	October 20, 2023	Dora Jar
A Perfect Circle	A Perfect Circle 2011 Tour	July 19, 2011	Red Bacteria Vacuum
AC/DC	Black Ice World Tour	December 18, 2008	The Answer
Adam Sandler	Adam Sandler Live	February 18, 2023	Kevin James (surprise guest)
Aerosmith	Rockin' the Joint Tour	January 12, 2006	Lenny Kravitz
Aerosmith	Peace Out: The Farewell Tour	October 17, 2023	The Black Crowes
Alan Jackson	2019 Tour	August 24, 2019	William Michael Morgan
Alicia Keys	Keys to the Summer Tour	July 2, 2023	Libianca
American Idol LIVE!	American Idols LIVE! Tour 2006	August 1, 2006	—N/a
American Idol LIVE!	American Idols LIVE! Tour 2008	August 17, 2008	—N/a
American Idol LIVE!	American Idols LIVE! Tour 2009	August 1, 2009	—N/a
American Idol LIVE!	American Idols LIVE! Tour 2011	July 28, 2011	—N/a
American Idol LIVE!	American Idols LIVE! Tour 2013	August 8, 2013	—N/a
AJR	The Maybe Man Tour	April 10, 2024	Dean Lewis
Ariana Grande	The Honeymoon Tour	July 21, 2015	Prince Royce
Ariana Grande	Sweetener World Tour	June 10, 2019	Normani; Social House
Aventura	Cerrando Ciclos	May 15, 2024	—N/a
Aventura	Cerrando Ciclos	May 16, 2024	—N/a
Avril Lavigne	Best Damn Tour	July 29, 2008	—N/a
Bad Bunny	Most Wanted Tour	May 10, 2024	—N/a
Barry Manilow	ONE LAST TIME! Tour	June 6, 2015	—N/a
B. Reith	2011 Tour	January 28, 2011	—N/a
Bert Kreischer	Tops Off World Tour	September 15, 2023	—N/a
Beyoncé	The Beyoncé Experience	July 29, 2007	Robin Thicke
Beyoncé	The Mrs. Carter Show World Tour	July 27, 2013	Luke James
Big Boogie, Blac Youngsta, GloRilla, Moneybagg Yo, Yo Gotti, EST Gee, Lil Poppa, Mozzy	CMG Gangsta Art Tour	December 3, 2024	—N/a
Billy Joel	Billy Joel in Concert	December 5, 2015	—N/a
Billie Eilish	Happier Than Ever, The World Tour	February 6, 2022	Tkay Maidza
Billie Eilish	Hit Me Hard and Soft: The Tour	October 19, 2025	Young Miko
Billie Eilish	Hit Me Hard and Soft: The Tour	October 20, 2025	Young Miko
The Black Eyed Peas	The E.N.D. World Tour	February 20, 2010	Ludacris & LMFAO
The Black Keys	Turn Blue Tour	December 11, 2014	St. Vincent
Blink-182	World Tour 2023/2024	July 14, 2023	Turnstile & Landon Barker
Blue Man Group	How to Be a Megastar Tour 2.0	November 17, 2006	Tracy Bonham
Blue Man Group	How to Be a Megastar Tour 2.1	November 3, 2007	Mike Relm
Bob Seger & the Silver Bullet Band	Face the Promise Tour	January 16, 2007	Eric Church
Bob Seger & the Silver Bullet Band	Rock & Roll Never Forgets Tour	April 25, 2013	Temperance League
Bon Jovi	Have a Nice Day Tour	January 18, 2006	—N/a
Bon Jovi	The Circle Tour	April 22, 2010	Dashboard Confessional
Bon Jovi	Because We Can Tour	March 5, 2013	—N/a
Bon Jovi	This House Is Not for Sale Tour	April 21, 2018	—N/a
Bon Jovi	2022 Tour	April 8, 2022	—N/a
Brandy & Monica	The Boy Is Mine Tour	November 13, 2025	Muni Long, Kelly Rowland, Jamal Roberts
Brantley Gilbert	Let It Ride Tour	December 4, 2014	Tyler Farr & Chase Bryant
Britney Spears	Femme Fatale Tour	August 25, 2011	Destinee & Paris; DJ Pauly D
Bruce Springsteen & the E Street Band	Magic Tour	April 27, 2008	—N/a
Bruce Springsteen & the E Street Band	Working on a Dream Tour	November 3, 2009	—N/a
Bruce Springsteen & the E Street Band	High Hopes Tour	April 19, 2014	—N/a
Bruno Mars	The Moonshine Jungle Tour	August 21, 2013	Fitz and the Tantrums
Bruno Mars	24K Magic World Tour	September 14, 2017	Dua Lipa
Bryan Adams	So Happy It Hurts Tour	March 10, 2024	Dave Stewart
Building 429	2006 Tour	March 24, 2006	Matthew West
Building 429	2012 Tour	April 20, 2012	—N/a
Building 429	We Won't Be Shaken Tour	February 22, 2014	Hawk Nelson, Satellites & Sirens & Lybecker
Carín León	Colmillo De Leche Tour	October 8, 2023	—N/a
Carrie Underwood	Play On Tour	October 30, 2010	Billy Currington & Sons of Sylvia
Carrie Underwood	Blown Away Tour	November 3, 2012	Hunter Hayes
Carrie Underwood	Storyteller Tour: Stories in the Round	October 23, 2016	Easton Corbin & The Swon Brothers
Carrie Underwood	Denim & Rhinestones Tour	February 8, 2023	Jimmie Allen
Celine Dion	Courage World Tour	January 21, 2020	—N/a
Charlie Daniels Band	2010 Tour	May 25, 2010	—N/a
Charlotte R&B Music Festival	–	June 6, 2023	—N/a
The Cheetah Girls	One World Tour	October 29, 2008	Clique Girlz
Cher	Dressed to Kill Tour	May 5, 2014	Cyndi Lauper
Cher	Here We Go Again Tour	January 29, 2019	Nile Rodgers & Chic
Chris Brown	Indigoat Tour	September 7, 2019	Tory Lanez, Ty Dolla Sign, Joyner Lucas & Yella Beezy
Chris Brown & Trey Songz	Between The Sheets Tour	March 14, 2015	Tyga
Chris Tomlin	Love Ran Red Tour	March 1, 2015	Rend Collective & Tenth Avenue North
Cirque du Soleil	Delirium	April 28, 2006	—N/a
Cirque du Soleil	Delirium	April 29, 2006	—N/a
Cirque du Soleil	Delirium	March 21, 2007	—N/a
Cirque du Soleil	Delirium	March 22, 2007	—N/a
Cirque du Soleil	Alegría	August 3, 2011	—N/a
Cirque du Soleil	Alegría	August 4, 2011	—N/a
Cirque du Soleil	Alegría	August 5, 2011	—N/a
Cirque du Soleil	Alegría	August 6, 2011	—N/a
Cirque du Soleil	Alegría	August 7, 2011	—N/a
Cirque du Soleil	Michael Jackson: The Immortal	March 13, 2012	—N/a
Cirque du Soleil	Michael Jackson: The Immortal	March 14, 2012	—N/a
Cirque du Soleil	Michael Jackson: The Immortal	April 8, 2014	—N/a
Cirque du Soleil	Michael Jackson: The Immortal	April 9, 2014	—N/a
Cirque du Soleil	Quidam	July 3, 2013	—N/a
Cirque du Soleil	Quidam	July 5, 2013	—N/a
Cirque du Soleil	Quidam	July 6, 2013	—N/a
Cirque du Soleil	Quidam	July 7, 2013	—N/a
Cirque du Soleil	Crystal	July 17, 2019	—N/a
Cirque du Soleil	Crystal	July 18, 2019	—N/a
Cirque du Soleil	Crystal	July 19, 2019	—N/a
Cirque du Soleil	Crystal	July 20, 2019	—N/a
Cirque du Soleil	Crystal	July 21, 2019	—N/a
Clay Aiken	2005 Joyful Noise Tour	December 21, 2005	—N/a
Coldplay	Mylo Xyloto Tour	July 3, 2012	Robyn
The Cure	4Tour	June 16, 2008	65daysofstatic
Daughtry	Leave This Town Tour	June 11, 2010	Lifehouse & Cavo
Dave Chappelle	It's a Celebration Tour	October 26, 2023	—N/a
Dead & Company	Dead & Company Fall Tour 2017	November 28, 2017	—N/a
Def Leppard & Journey	Def Leppard & Journey 2018 Tour	June 9, 2018	—N/a
Demi Lovato	Neon Lights Tour	February 23, 2014	Fifth Harmony; Little Mix
Dierks Bentley	2009 Tour	June 6, 2009	—N/a
The Doodlebops	2008 Tour	April 17, 2008	—N/a
Dolly Parton	The Vintage Tour	December 15, 2005	The Grascals
Dolly Parton	Pure & Simple Tour	November 19, 2016	—N/a
Doja Cat	The Scarlet Tour	November 26, 2023	Ice Spice
Drake	Would You like a Tour?	November 2, 2013	Miguel, Future & PartyNextDoor
Drake	It's All a Blur Tour	September 22, 2023	21 Savage
Drake	It's All a Blur Tour	September 23, 2023	21 Savage
Dua Lipa	Future Nostalgia Tour	February 16, 2022	Caroline Polachek & Lolo Zouaï
Eagles	Long Road Out of Eden Tour	January 14, 2009	—N/a
Eagles	History of the Eagles Tour	November 15, 2013	JD & the Straight Shot
Eagles	An Evening with the Eagles	April 11, 2018	—N/a
Eagles	The Long Goodbye Final Tour	November 7, 2023	The Doobie Brothers
Eagles	The Long Goodbye Final Tour	March 16, 2024	Vince Gill
Earth, Wind & Fire & Chicago	2009 Tour	July 29, 2009	—N/a
Earth Wind & Fire, Chic	2054: The Tour	August 18, 2017	—N/a
Ed Sheeran	x Tour	September 11, 2014	Rudimental
Ed Sheeran	÷ Tour	September 3, 2017	James Blunt
Elton John	Peachtree Road Tour	November 12, 2005	—N/a
Elton John	Farewell Yellow Brick Road Tour	November 6, 2019	—N/a
Elton John & Billy Joel	Face to Face 2009	March 7, 2009	—N/a
En Vogue	2010 Tour	February 27, 2010	—N/a
Eric Church	Blood, Sweat & Beers Tour	November 28, 2012	Justin Moore & Kip Moore
Eric Clapton	2006 Tour	October 17, 2006	Robert Cray Band
Eric Clapton	50th Anniversary Tour	April 2, 2013	The Wallflowers
Erykah Badu	Unfollow Me Tour	July 16, 2023	Yasiin Bey
Fall Out Boy	The Mania Tour	November 3, 2017	Blackbear & Jaden Smith
Fleetwood Mac	Unleashed Tour	April 25, 2009	—N/a
Fleetwood Mac	Fleetwood Mac Live	June 24, 2013	—N/a
Fleetwood Mac	On with the Show Tour	March 7, 2015	—N/a
Fleetwood Mac	An Evening with Fleetwood Mac	February 24, 2019	—N/a
Florence and the Machine	High as Hope Tour	October 3, 2018	Billie Eilish
Foo Fighters	Wasting Light Tour	November 8, 2011	Social Distortion & The Joy Formidable
Fresh Music Festival	—	July 1, 2012	—N/a
Frankie Beverly & Maze	I Wanna Thank You Tour	February 3, 2024	Patti LaBelle & Stephanie Mills
Gaither Homecoming	2005 Tour	December 31, 2005	—N/a
Gaither Homecoming	2008 Tour	September 8, 2008	—N/a
Genesis	The Last Domino? Tour	November 20, 2021	—N/a
Gorillaz	The Mountain Tour	September 23, 2026	Deltron 3030; Little Simz
Guns N' Roses	Not in This Lifetime... Tour	September 25, 2019	Shooter Jennings
Guns N' Roses	2023 Tour	August 29, 2023	Dirty Honey
Hall & Oates & Train	Summer 2018 Tour	June 18, 2018	—N/a
Halsey	Hopeless Fountain Kingdom Tour	October 17, 2017	PartyNextDoor & Charli XCX
Hank Williams Jr.	Rowdy Frynds Tour	May 31, 2008	Lynyrd Skynyrd
Heart	Royal Flush Tour	May 11, 2024	Cheap Trick
High School Musical	High School Musical: The Concert	December 23, 2006	Jordan Pruitt
Imagine Dragons	Smoke + Mirrors Tour	July 7, 2015	Metric & Halsey
Imagine Dragons	Evolve Tour	November 8, 2017	Grouplove & K.Flay
J. Cole	4 Your Eyez Only World Tour	August 9, 2017	Anderson .Paak
James Blunt	Back to Bedlam Tour	October 14, 2006	Starsailor
James Taylor & Carole King	Troubadour Reunion Tour	June 2, 2010	—N/a
James Taylor	—	May 16, 2018	—N/a
Jay-Z	Magna Carter World Tour	January 4, 2014	—N/a
Jay-Z	4:44 Tour	November 16, 2017	Vic Mensa
Jim Gaffigan	Noble Ape Tour	November 10, 2017	—N/a
Jonas Brothers	Jonas Brothers World Tour 2009	August 21, 2009	Honor Society & Wonder Girls
Jonas Brothers	Happiness Begins Tour	November 20, 2019	Bebe Rexha & Jordan McGraw
Jonas Brothers	Five Albums. One Night. The World Tour	September 30, 2023	Lawrence
John Mayer	Summer Tour 2019	August 9, 2019	—N/a
John Mayer	Sob Rock Tour	April 8, 2022	—N/a
John Mayer	Solo Tour	October 23, 2023	JP Saxe
Joji	Pandemonium World Tour	November 4, 2023	Kenny Beats, SavageRealm, Lil Toe
Josh Groban	Awake Tour	September 2, 2007	Angélique Kidjo
Josh Groban	Straight to You Tour	June 10, 2011	Eric Lewis
"Just Us" Jesus Gospel Concert	—	November 18, 2012	—N/a
Journey	Freedom Tour	April 28, 2022	Toto
Justin Bieber	My World Tour	August 8, 2010	Iyaz, Vita Chambers & Sean Kingston
Justin Bieber	Believe Tour	January 22, 2013	Carly Rae Jepsen; Cody Simpson
Justin Timberlake	The 20/20 Experience World Tour	July 12, 2014	DJ Freestyle
Justin Timberlake	The Man of the Woods Tour	January 8, 2019	Francesco Yates
Kanye West	Glow in the Dark Tour	May 8, 2008	Rihanna, Lupe Fiasco, N.E.R.D & DJ Craze
Keith Urban	Still Alive in '06 Tour	February 16, 2006	Pat Green
Keith Urban	Escape Together Tour	June 18, 2009	Sugarland
Keith Urban	Get Closer 2011 World Tour	June 24, 2011	Jake Owen
Keith Urban & Carrie Underwood	Love, Pain & The Whole Crazy Carnival Ride Tour	April 18, 2008	—N/a
Kendrick Lamar	The Damn. Tour	August 29, 2017	YG & DRAM
Keri Hilson	2008 Tour	January 2, 2008	—N/a
Keyshia Cole	Love Hard Tour	March 14, 2024	Trey Songz, K. Michelle, Jaheim
Khalid	Free Spirit Tour	August 13, 2019	Clairo
Kid Rock	American Rock N' Roll Tour	February 10, 2018	—N/a
Kirk Franklin	The Reunion Tour 2023	October 12, 2023	—N/a
Lady Gaga	The Monster Ball Tour	September 18, 2010	Semi Precious Weapons & Lady Starlight
Lainey Wilson	Whirlwind World Tour	October 25, 2025	ERNEST & Drake Milligan
Lana Del Rey	LA to the Moon Tour	January 30, 2018	Kali Uchis
Lauren Daigle	The Kaleidoscope Tour	February 22, 2024	—N/a
Lil Baby	It's Only Us Tour	September 12, 2023	GloRilla, Gloss Up, Rylo Rodriguez, Hunxho
Lil Wayne	I Am Music Tour	January 2, 2009	Gym Class Heroes, T-Pain, Keri Hilson & Keyshia Cole
LL Cool J	F.O.R.C.E. Tour	September 9, 2023	The Roots, DJ Jazzy Jeff, Rakim, Juvenile, De La Soul, Z-Trip
Lizzo	The Special Tour	October 20, 2022	Latto
Machine Gun Kelly	Mainstream Sellout Tour	June 21, 2022	Avril Lavigne & Iann Dior
Madonna	The MDNA Tour	November 15, 2012	Martin Solveig
Maluma	Don Juan Tour	October 21, 2023	—N/a
Mannheim Steamroller	2005 Christmas Tour	December 11, 2005	—N/a
Maroon 5	Red Pill Blues Tour	October 4, 2018	Julia Michaels
Martina McBride	Timeless Tour	April 1, 2006	The Warren Brothers
Maxwell	BLACKsummers'night Tour	October 6, 2009	Chrisette Michele & Common
Maxwell & Mary J. Blige	King and Queen of Hearts World Tour	November 22, 2016	Ro James
Maze	2006 Tour	May 21, 2006	—N/a
Melanie Martinez	Hades: The Sacrifice	July 27, 2026	Haute and Freddy
Metallica	World Magnetic Tour	October 18, 2009	Gojira & Lamb of God
Metallica	WorldWired Tour	October 22, 2018	Jim Breuer
Michael Bublé	Call Me Irresponsible Tour	March 18, 2008	—N/a
Michael Bublé	Crazy Love Tour	July 10, 2010	Naturally 7
Michael Bublé	To Be Loved Tour	October 26, 2013	Naturally 7
Michael Bublé	An Evening with Michael Bublé	October 26, 2021	Naturally 7
Miley Cyrus	Best of Both Worlds Tour	November 27, 2007	Jonas Brothers
Miley Cyrus	Wonder World Tour	November 24, 2009	Metro Station
Miley Cyrus	Bangerz Tour	August 6, 2014	Lily Allen
Moneybagg Yo	Larger Than Life Tour	August 6, 2023	Big Boogie, Finesse2tymes, Sexyy Red, Luh Tyler, YTB Fatt
Mötley Crüe	Mötley Crüe Final Tour	August 29, 2015	Alice Cooper & the Cringe
Mount Westmore	Mainstream Sellout Tour	May 8, 2022	—N/a
Mumford & Sons	Wilder Mind Tour	April 14, 2016	Blake Mills
Muse	The 2nd Law World Tour	September 3, 2013	Cage the Elephant
Natalie Grant	2011 Tour	September 23, 2011	Janice Gaines
Natalie Grant	2011 Tour	September 24, 2011	Janice Gaines
Nate Bargatze	Be Funny Tour	January 14, 2024	—N/a
NBA YoungBoy	Make America Slime Again Tour	October 26, 2025	K3, Lil Dump, Dee Baby, NoCap, Offset
Neil Diamond	Concert of a Lifetime Tour	December 12, 2008	—N/a
New Edition	The New Edition Way Tour	February 27, 2026	Boyz II Men & Toni Braxton
New Kids on the Block	New Kids on the Block: Live	October 30, 2008	Natasha Bedingfield & Lady Gaga
New Kids on the Block	The Main Event	June 2, 2015	TLC & Nelly
New Kids on the Block, Boyz II Men & 98 Degrees	The Package Tour	June 19, 2013	—N/a
New Year's Eve Jam	—	December 31, 2011	—N/a
New Year's Eve Jam	—	December 31, 2012	—N/a
New Year's Eve Jam	—	December 31, 2013	—N/a
New Year's Eve Jam	—	December 31, 2014	—N/a
Nickelback	All the Right Reasons Tour	March 23, 2006	Chevelle & Trapt
Nicki Minaj	Pink Friday 2 World Tour	March 26, 2024	Monica
Nicole C. Mullen	2006 Tour	October 26, 2006	—N/a
Nicole C. Mullen	2006 Tour	October 27, 2006	—N/a
Old Dominion	Make It Sweet Tour	September 27, 2019	Jordan Davis & Ryan Hurd
Olivia Rodrigo	Guts World Tour	March 8, 2024	Chappell Roan
Olivia Rodrigo	The Unraveled Tour	October 7, 2026	Wolf Alice
Olivia Rodrigo	The Unraveled Tour	October 8, 2026	Wolf Alice
One Direction	Up All Night Tour	June 27, 2012	Olly Murs & Manika
Oprah Winfrey	2020 Vision Tour	January 18, 2020	Amy Schumer
Panic! at the Disco	Pray for the Wicked Tour	January 22, 2019	Two Feet & Betty Who
Paramore	This Is Why Tour	May 23, 2023	Bloc Party & Genesis Owusu
Paul McCartney	Up and Coming Tour	July 28, 2010	—N/a
Pearl Jam	Lightning Bolt Tour	October 30, 2013	—N/a
Phil Collins	Not Dead Yet Tour	September 29, 2019	—N/a
P!nk	The Truth About Love Tour	March 16, 2013	City and Colour
P!nk	Beautiful Trauma Tour	March 9, 2019	Julia Michaels & KidCutUp
P!nk	Trustfall Tour	November 12, 2023	Grouplove & KidCutUp
Pitbull, Enrique Iglesias & Ricky Martin	The Trilogy Tour 'The Party Continues'	March 2, 2024	—N/a
The Police	The Police Reunion Tour	November 15, 2007	Fiction Plane
Prince & the New Power Generation	Welcome 2 Tour	March 24, 2011	Anthony Hamilton
Queen + Adam Lambert	The Rhapsody Tour	August 23, 2019	—N/a
R. Kelly	Double Up Tour	November 18, 2007	Keyshia Cole, Ne-Yo & J. Holiday
Rae Sremmurd	SremmLife Tour 2	May 17, 2017	—N/a
Reba McEntire & Kelly Clarkson	2 Worlds 2 Voices Tour	November 21, 2008	Melissa Peterman
Red Hot Chili Peppers	Stadium Arcadium World Tour	January 23, 2007	Gnarls Barkley
Red Hot Chili Peppers	I'm with You World Tour	April 6, 2012	Santigold
Red Hot Chili Peppers	The Getaway World Tour	April 17, 2017	Babymetal & Jack Irons
Rihanna	Anti World Tour	March 20, 2016	Travis Scott
The Rock & Worship Roadshow	2010 Tour	March 12, 2010	—N/a
Rod Stewart	Summer Tour 2018	July 28, 2018	Cyndi Lauper
Rod Wave	Nostalgia Tour	November 15, 2023	Ari Lennox & Toosi
Roger Waters & the Bleeding Heart Band	The Wall Live	July 10, 2012	—N/a
Romeo Santos	Fórmula, Vol. 3: La Gira	October 28, 2023	—N/a
Romeo Santos	Fórmula, Vol. 3: La Gira	October 29, 2023	—N/a
Rush	Clockwork Angels Tour	October 30, 2012	—N/a
Rush	Fifty Something Tour	November 20, 2026	—N/a
Rush	Fifty Something Tour	November 22, 2026	—N/a
Sade	Sade Live	July 31, 2011	John Legend
Sam Smith	In the Lonely Hour Tour	July 18, 2015	Gavin James
Sam Smith	The Thrill of It All Tour	July 6, 2018	Cam
Santa Fe Klan	Toda y Nada Tour	July 6, 2023	Snow tha Product
Selena Gomez	Stars Dance Tour	October 27, 2013	Emblem3, Christina Grimmie & James David
Selena Gomez	Revival Tour	June 7, 2016	DNCE; Bea Miller
Shakira	Las Mujeres Ya No Lloran World Tour	November 23, 2024	
Shania Twain	Rock This Country Tour	July 19, 2015	Gavin DeGraw
Stevie Nicks	24 Karat Gold Tour	November 10, 2016	The Pretenders
Stevie Nicks	Live in Concert	October 21, 2025	—N/a
Stevie Wonder	A Wonder Summer's Night Tour	November 28, 2007	—N/a
Soulive	2008 Tour	August 2, 2008	—N/a
Suicideboys	Grey Day Tour	September 5, 2023	Ghostemane, City Morgue, Sematary, Ramirez
Tate McRae	Miss Possessive Tour	October 24, 2025	Alessi Rose
Taylor Swift	Fearless Tour	September 5, 2009	Kellie Pickler; Gloriana
Taylor Swift	Speak Now World Tour	November 16, 2011	Needtobreathe; Danny Gokey
Taylor Swift	The Red Tour	March 22, 2013	Ed Sheeran; Brett Eldredge
Taylor Swift	The 1989 World Tour	June 8, 2015	Vance Joy
Tim McGraw & Faith Hill	Soul2Soul II Tour	February 10, 2006	—N/a
Tim McGraw	Standing Room Only Tour	May 17, 2024	Carly Pearce
TobyMac	Hits Deep Tour	February 20, 2016	Colton Dixon & Britt Nicole
TobyMac	Hits Deep Tour 2023	November 2, 2023	MercyMe & Zach Williams
Tool	Tool in Concert	January 21, 2024	Elder
Trans-Siberian Orchestra	Christmas Eve and Other Stories	November 20, 2008	—N/a
Trans-Siberian Orchestra	Christmas Eve and Other Stories	November 28, 2009	—N/a
Trans-Siberian Orchestra	Christmas Eve and Other Stories	December 2, 2010	—N/a
Trans-Siberian Orchestra	Christmas Eve and Other Stories	December 1, 2011	—N/a
Trans-Siberian Orchestra	The Lost Christmas Eve	November 29, 2012	—N/a
Trans-Siberian Orchestra	The Christmas Attic	November 20, 2014	—N/a
Trans-Siberian Orchestra	–	December 8, 2016	—N/a
Trans-Siberian Orchestra	–	December 8, 2018	—N/a
Trans-Siberian Orchestra	–	December 7, 2019	—N/a
Trans-Siberian Orchestra	–	December 10, 2022	—N/a
Trans-Siberian Orchestra	-	December 14, 2024	—N/a
Travis Scott	Astroworld – Wish You Were Here Tour	March 24, 2019	Sheck Wes
Travis Scott	Circus Maximus Tour	October 11, 2023	Teezo Touchdown
Twenty One Pilots	The Bandito Tour	June 12, 2019	Bear Hands
Twenty One Pilots	The Icy Tour	September 4, 2022	Peter McPoland
Twice	This Is For World Tour	March 31, 2026	—N/a
U2	Vertigo Tour	December 12, 2005	Institute
Union Station	2007 Tour	August 17, 2007	—N/a
Usher	OMG Tour	April 30, 2011	Akon & the Cataracs
Usher	Usher: Past Present Future	October 22, 2024	
Usher	Usher: Past Present Future	October 23, 2024	
Van Halen	2007 North American Tour	September 27, 2007	Ky-Mani Marley
Van Halen	A Different Kind of Truth Tour	April 25, 2012	Kool & the Gang
The Wiggles	2006 Tour	August 25, 2006 (2 shows)	—N/a
The Wiggles	2011 Tour	July 13, 2011	—N/a
Winter Jam Tour Spectacular	–	January 13, 2008	—N/a
Winter Jam Tour Spectacular	–	January 11, 2009	—N/a
Winter Jam Tour Spectacular	–	January 10, 2010	—N/a
Winter Jam Tour Spectacular	–	January 9, 2011	—N/a
Winter Jam Tour Spectacular	–	January 8, 2012	—N/a
Winter Jam Tour Spectacular	–	January 5, 2013	—N/a
Winter Jam Tour Spectacular	–	January 5, 2014	—N/a
Winter Jam Tour Spectacular	–	January 18, 2015	—N/a
Winter Jam Tour Spectacular	–	March 26, 2016	—N/a
Winter Jam Tour Spectacular	–	February 19, 2017	—N/a
Winter Jam Tour Spectacular	–	January 21, 2018	—N/a
Winter Jam Tour Spectacular	–	January 20, 2019	—N/a
Xscape	The Great Xscape Tour	December 2, 2017	Tamar Braxton

List of wrestling events
Event	Date	Notes
WWE Raw	January 23, 2006	
WWE Raw	November 26, 2007	
WWE Raw	June 15, 2009	
WWE Raw	June 14, 2010	
WWE Raw	March 25, 2012	
WWE Raw	October 29, 2012	
WWE Raw	November 28, 2016	
WWE Raw	October 29, 2018	This event featured a confronation between Brothers of Destruction (The Undertaker & Kane) and D-Generation X (Triple H & Shawn Michaels)
WWE Raw	October 24, 2022	
WWE Raw	September 4, 2023	This event marked the debut of "Main Event" Jey Uso on RAW which is his first solo run without his twin brother Jimmy Uso
WWE Raw	February 17, 2025	
WWE SmackDown!, WWE ECW and NXT	June 19, 2007	This event featured the last match of Chris Benoit, who died several days later
WWE SmackDown!, WWE ECW and NXT	July 15, 2008	
WWE SmackDown!, WWE ECW and NXT	December 26, 2008	
WWE SmackDown!, WWE ECW and NXT	April 5, 2011	
WWE SmackDown!, WWE ECW and NXT	November 29, 2011	
WWE SmackDown!, WWE ECW and NXT	November 5, 2013	
WWE SmackDown!, WWE ECW and NXT	November 14, 2017	This event featured an appearance by Ric Flair, months after a serious illness earlier in the year. Episode also featured the RAW roster invade SmackDown Live roster, days before Survivor Series
WWE SmackDown!, WWE ECW and NXT	February 26, 2019	
WWE SmackDown!, WWE ECW and NXT	March 18, 2022	This show aired on the 20th anniversary of Brock Lesnar's debut in WWE. Brock Lesnar made an appearance during the episode
WWE SmackDown!, WWE ECW and NXT	February 9, 2024	
WWE SmackDown!, WWE ECW and NXT	February 6, 2026	
Vengeance	June 25, 2006	
Vengeance	February 4, 2023	This was the first standalone NXT livestreaming event since NXT TakeOver: Portland in February 2020 to take place outside of Florida.
Clash of Champions	September 15, 2019	"The Fiend" Bray Wyatt attacked Seth Rollins after the main event.

=== In film and television ===
- One Tree Hill location shoot for the season six finale, "Remember Me as a Time of Day". Aired on May 18, 2009.
- American Idol Season 12 auditions, June 19, 2012.
- The series finale of Veep is primarily set in this venue.

== Gallery ==
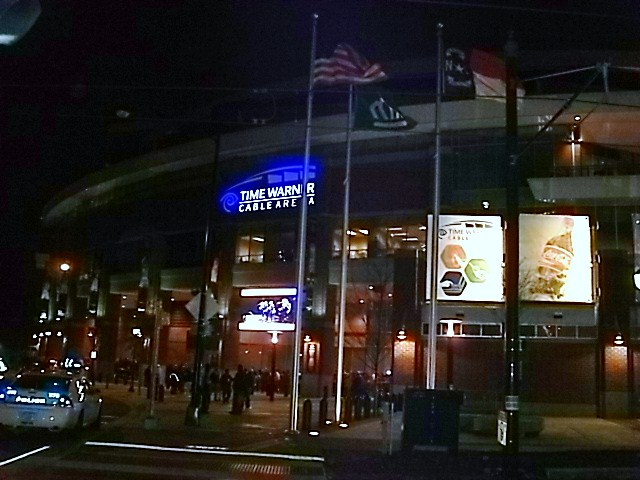
The arena in 2008, with its first Time Warner Cable Arena logo

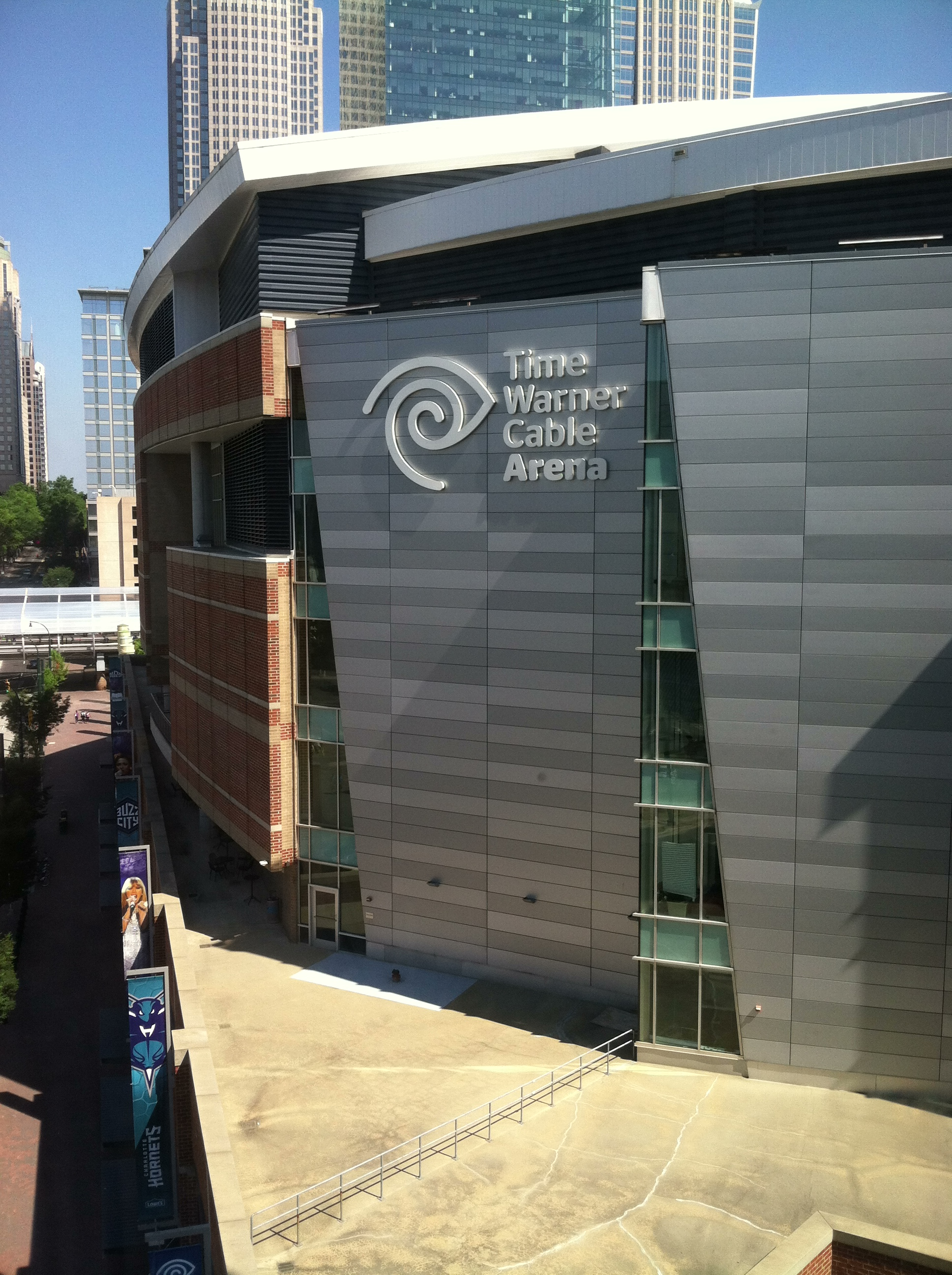
The exterior in 2015

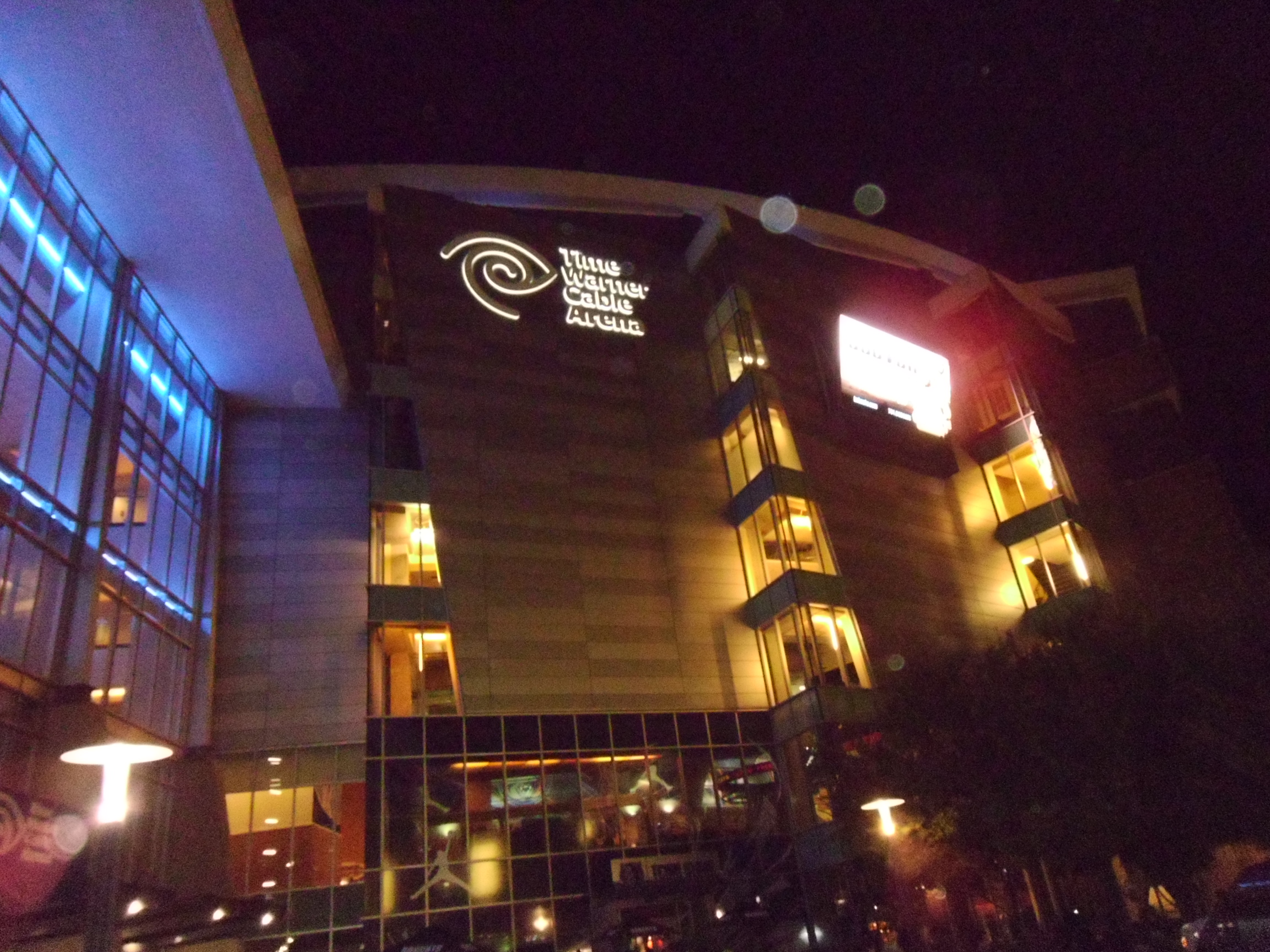
The exterior in 2012

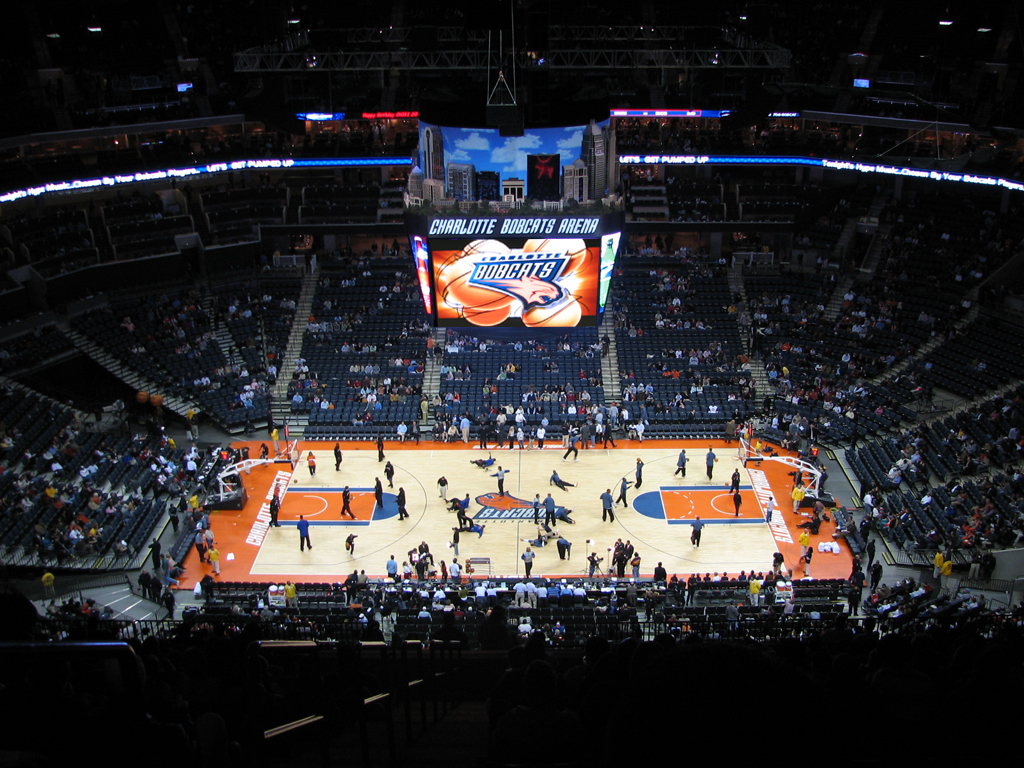
The arena during a Charlotte Bobcats game in 2005

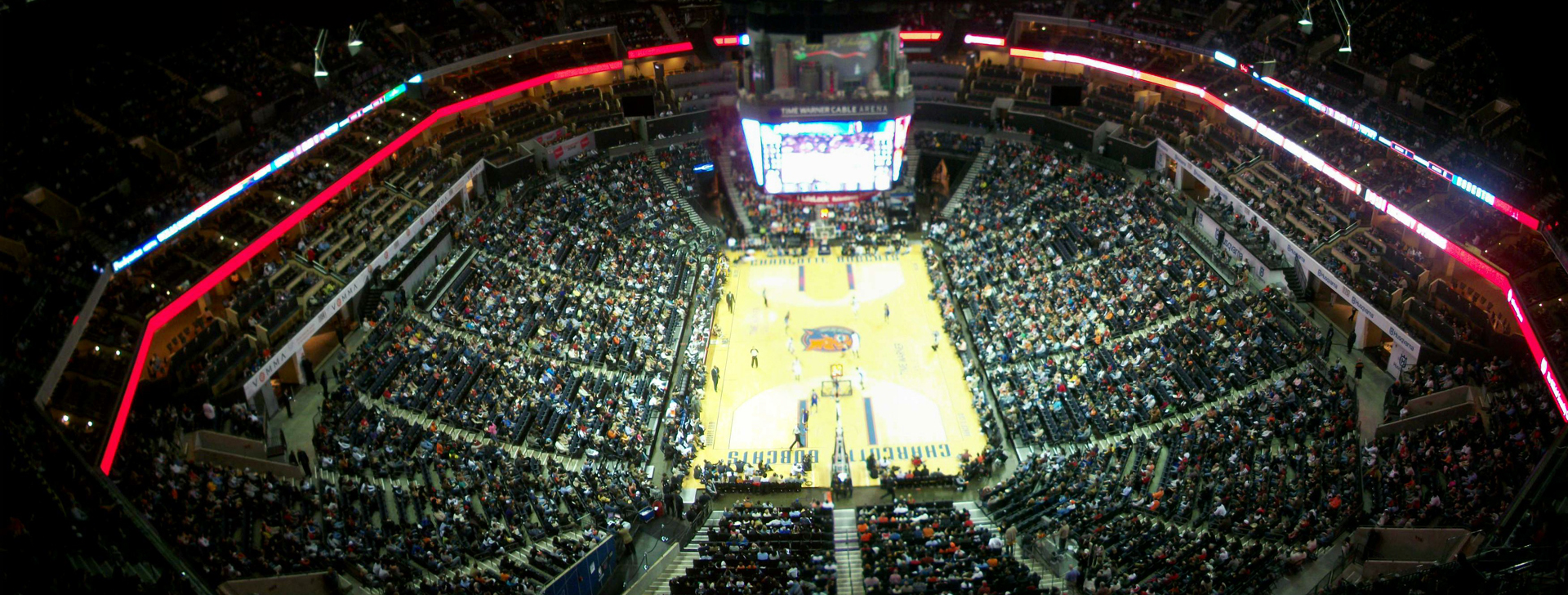
Interior in 2011

== See also ==
- List of indoor arenas by capacity
- List of indoor arenas in the United States

Events and tenants
Preceded by Charlotte Coliseum	Home of the Charlotte Hornets; 2005 – present	Succeeded by current
Preceded by Times Union Center (Albany)	Home of the Charlotte Checkers (AHL); 2010 – 2015	Succeeded by Bojangles' Coliseum
Preceded by Independence Arena	Home of the Charlotte Checkers (ECHL); 2005 – 2010	Succeeded by last arena
Preceded by Charlotte Coliseum	Home of the Charlotte Sting; 2005 – 2007	Succeeded by last arena
