= Carl Cox discography =

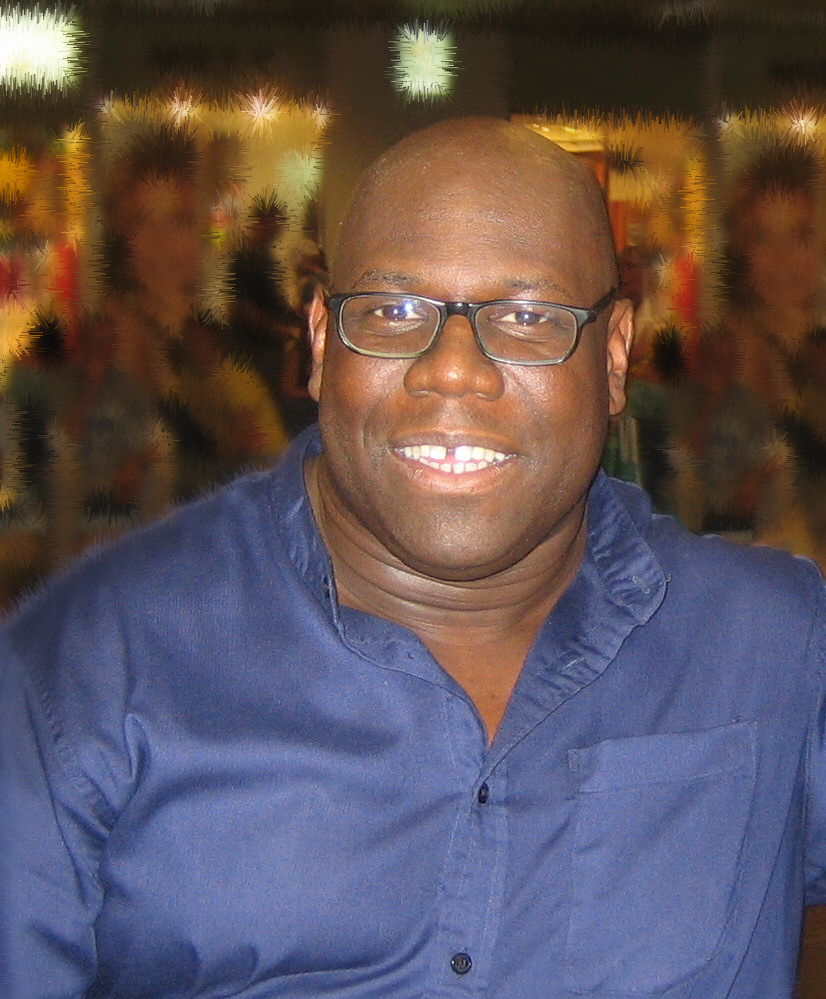
Cox in 2005

The discography of Carl Cox, British house music and techno producer and DJ, consists of four albums, 25 singles, 26 compilation albums, and 66 remixes.

== Studio albums ==
- 1996: At The End Of The Cliche, Edel UK Records/Worldwide Ultimatum Records
- 1999: Phuture 2000, Edel UK Records/Worldwide Ultimatum Records
- 2005: Second Sign, Play It Again Sam
- 2011: All Roads Lead To The Dancefloor, Intec Digital
- 2022: Electronic Generations, BMG

== Extended plays ==
- 2019: Mindset EP with Coe, Awesome Soundwave

== Singles ==
- 1989: "Let's Do It", N/A
- 1991: "I Want You (Forever)", Perfecto Records – UK No.23
- 1992: "Does It Feel Good To You", Perfecto Records
- 1993: "The Planet of Love", Perfecto Records – UK No.44
- 1995: "Two Paintings and A Drum", Edel UK Records – UK No.24
- 1996: "Sensual Sophis-ti-cat" / "The Player", Worldwide Ultimatum Records – UK No.25
- 1996: "Tribal Jedi", Edel UK Records/Worldwide Ultimatum Records
- 1999: "The Latin Theme", Edel UK Records – UK No.52
- 1998: "Phuture 2000", Worldwide Ultimatum Records – UK No.40
- 1999: "Dr. Funk", Edel UK Records/Worldwide Ultimatum Records
- 2000: "Golden Warrior", So Dens
- 2003: "Dirty Bass" featuring Christian Smith, 23rd Century Records
- 2003: "Want A Life", Trust the DJ
- 2004: "Give Me Your Love" featuring Hannah Robinson, 23rd Century Records
- 2004: "Put Your Hands Up", Trust the DJ
- 2006: "Thats the Bass" featuring Norman Cook, 23rd Century Records
- 2006: "K'Pasa", Intec Records
- 2006: "Spoon", Intec Records
- 2011: "Chemistry" featuring Shelley Segal, Intec Digital
- 2011: "Nexus", Intec Digital
- 2011: "Family Guy", Intec Digital
- 2012: "Caipiroska", Snatch! Records
- 2013: "Time for House Music", Circus Recordings
- 2014: "See You Next Tuesday" featuring Nicole Moudaber, MOOD Records
- 2016: "Your Light Shines On", Intec Digital
- 2017: "Beat the Track" with Nile Rodgers, Bush Records
- 2018: "Inferno" with Reinier Zonneveld and Christopher Coe, Filth on Acid
- 2019: "Dark Alleys", Circus Recordings
- 2019: "This Is Our Time" with Reinier Zonneveld and Christopher Coe, Filth on Acid
- 2020: "PURE", 23rd Century Records
- 2021: "Sand, Moon and Stars", BMG
- 2021: "We Are One" with Franky Wah, Ministry Of Sound
- 2022: "Speed Trials On Acid" with Fatboy Slim featuring Dan Diamond, BMG
- 2022: "How It Makes You Feel" with Nicole Moudaber, BMG
- 2022: "See the Sun Rising" with Franky Wah, BMG
- 2023: "Music Is Life" with Bushwacka! featuring Chuck Roberts, Oblong Records

== Compilations ==
- 1994: Nonstopmix 1994, Liquid Rec.
- 1994: Fantazia presents The DJ Collection Carl Cox, Fantazia
- 1995: F.A.C.T., React
- 1997: F.A.C.T. 2, Worldwide Ultimatum Records
- 1998: DJF 250, Sony Music Entertainment
- 1998: Non Stop 98/01, FFRR Records
- 1998: The Sound Of Ultimate B.A.S.E., Worldwide Ultimatum Records
- 1999: Non Stop 2000, FFRR Records
- 1999: F.A.C.T. Australia, X-Over Recordings. Chart Peak (AUS) #88
- 2000: Mixed Live Crobar Nightclub, Chicago, Moonshine Music
- 2002: Mixed Live 2nd Session Area 2, Detroit, Moonshine Music
- 2002: Club Traxx Vol. 1, Trust the DJ
- 2003: Club Traxx Vol. 2, Trust the DJ
- 2003: F.A.C.T. Australia II, Warner Music Group
- 2003: U60311 Compilation Techno Division Vol. 3, V2 Records
- 2004: Back To Mine, DMC Publishing
- 2004: Pure Intec, Intec Records
- 2007: Global, Play It Again Sam
- 2008: Ultimate Carl Cox, Ministry of Sound Australia
- 2010: Global Underground 38 – Black Rock Desert, Global Underground
- 2013: Pure Intec 2: Mixed by Carl Cox, Intec Digital
- 2014: Mixmag Presents Carl Cox: Sounds of Ibiza, Mixmag Records
- 2014: Space Ibiza 2014: Carl Cox Mix, Cr2 Records
- 2015: Mixmag Presents Carl Cox: Space Terrace Ibiza, Mixmag Records
- 2015: In the Process of Eight, Circus Recordings
- 2016: Space Ibiza 2016, Cr2 Records

== Remixes ==
- 1991: Supreme Love Gods – "Cherry White" (Carl Cox Remix), One Little Indian
- 1991: Art of Noise – "Shades of Paranoimia" (Carl Cox Remix), China Records
- 1992: Eternal – "Eternal" (Carl Cox Remix), Underground Level Recordings
- 1992: Robert Owens – "Gotta Work" (Carl's Renaissance Remix), Freetown Inc.
- 1992: Patti Day – "Hot Stuff" (Carl Cox Remix), Starway Records
- 1992: DJ Phantasy – "Jepron" (Carl Cox Remix), Liquid Wax Recordings
- 1992: Sunscreem – "Perfect Motion" (Carl Cox Rhythm's A Drug Remix), Sony BMG Music Entertainment
- 1993: Visa – "Let Me See Ya Move" (Carl Cox's Militant March Remix), MMR Productions
- 1993: Smooth But Hazzardous – "Made You Dance" (Carl Cox Remix), Sound Entity Records
- 1994: Laurent Garnier – "Astral Dreams" (Carl Cox's MMR Remix), F-Communications
- 1994: Trevor Rockcliffe Presents Glow – "Break the Law" (Carl's Reconstructed Remix), MMR Productions
- 1994: Quench – "Hope" (Carl Cox's MMR Remix), Infectious Records
- 1994: FKW – "Jingo" (Carl Cox Remix), PWL
- 1994: O.T.T. – "Raw" (Carl Cox Remix), Industrial Strength Records
- 1994: Conquer – "Self Destruction" (Carl Cox's Kinetic Mix), MMR Productions
- 1994: Aurora Borealis – "Raz" (Carl's MMR Remix), F-Communications
- 1994: English Muffin – "The Blood of An English Muffin" (Carl Cox Remix), MMR Productions
- 1994: Lunatic Asylum – "The Meltdown (Carl Cox & John Selway's Circular Circuit Remix)", MMR Productions
- 1995: Jam & Spoon – "Angel (Ladadi O-Heyo)" (Carl Cox Remix), Epic Records
- 1995: The Stone Roses – "Begging You" (Cox's Ultimatum Remix), Geffen Records
- 1995: Yello – "L'Hôtel" (Carl Cox's Hands on Yello Remix), Urban
- 1995: Dr. Fernando – "Stomace Substance" (Carl Cox Remix), MMR Productions
- 1995: Infrequent Oscillation – "Burning Phibes" (Carl Cox Remix), MMR Productions
- 1995: Technohead – "Get Stoned" (Carl Cox Remix), Mokum Records
- 1995: AWeX – "It's Our Future" (Carl Cox's Ultimate Remix), Plastic City UK
- 1995: Slab – "Rampant Prankster" (Carl Cox's Jumper Remix), Hydrogen Dukebox
- 1995: Steve Mason & Tony Crooks – "Shallow Grave" (Carl Cox's After Hours Remix), Rain Forest Records
- 1995: Josh Abrahams – "March Time" (Carl Cox Remix), MMR Productions
- 1996: System 7 – "Hangar 84" (Cox's W.W. Ultimatum Remix), Butterfly Records
- 1996: Electroliners – "Loose Caboose" (Carl Cox Remix), XL Recordings
- 1996: Barefoot Boys – "Need No Man" (Cox's Harder Remix), Stealth Records
- 1996: The Advent – "Mad Dog" (Carl Cox Remix), Internal
- 1996: JX – "There's Nothing I Won't Do" (Carl Cox's Full House Remix), FFRR Records
- 1996: Consolidated – "This Is Fascism" (Carl Cox's Burning Gold Remix), MC Projects
- 1996: Vernon – "Vernon's Wonderland" (Carl Cox's Full Remix), Eye Q
- 1996: Poltergeist – "Vicious Circles" (Carl Cox's MMR Remix), Manifesto
- 1997: DJ SS – "DJs Anthem" (Carl Cox Remix), Formation Records
- 1997: Tenth Chapter – "Prologue" (Carl Cox & Paul van Dyk Remix), Jackpot
- 1998: Stone Circle – "The Sounds Of Ultimate B.A.S.E." (Carl Cox's Original Mix), Worldwide Ultimatum Records
- 1999: Needle Damage – "That Zipper Track" (Carl Cox Remix), Worldwide Ultimatum Records
- 1999: Grooverider – "Where's Jack the Ripper?" (Carl Cox's Techno Radio Edit), Higher Ground Records
- 2000: Tony Moran featuring Cindy Mizelle – "Shine On" (Carl Cox's Sweat Dub), Contagious Records
- 2001: Slam – "Positive Education" (Carl Cox's Intec Remix), VC Recordings
- 2001: Trevor Rockcliffe & Blake Baxter – "Visions of You" (Carl Cox Remix), Intec Records
- 2001: Ramirez – "Volcan De Pasion" (Carl Cox Remix), Terapia
- 2002: Cormano – "Mangamana vs. Revenge" (Carl Cox's Turntable Remix), 4 Play Records, Inc.
- 2003: Tomaz vs Filterheadz – "Sunshine" (Carl Cox Remix), Intec Records
- 2003: Bad Cabbage – "You're Rude (Get Fucked)" (Carl Cox's Not So Rude Remix), Mutant Disc
- 2004: Eric Powell – "Don't Deny It" (Carl Cox Remix), 23rd Century Records
- 2004: Johan Cyber – "Natural Funk" (Carl Cox Remix), 23rd Century Records
- 2004: Cohen vs. Deluxe – "Just Kick!" (Carl Cox Remix), Intec Records
- 2005: Len Faki – "Just A Dance" (Carl Cox Remix), Figure
- 2007: Sander van Doorn – "Riff" (Carl Cox's Global Remix), Ultra Records
- 2010: Jon Rundell – "Damager" (Carl Cox Remix), Intec
- 2010: Moby – "Walk With Me" (Carl Cox Remix), Little Idiot
- 2010: Gilles Peterson Presents Havana Cultura featuring Ogguere – "Arroz con Pollo" (Carl Cox Remix), Brownswood Recordings
- 2010: Joey Beltram – "Slice 2010" (Carl Cox Rerub), Bush Records
- 2011: Dome Patrol – "The Cutting Edge" (Carl Cox & Julika Remix), Bush Records
- 2012: Tom Taylor & Gareth Whitehead – "Tired of Being Wrong" (Carl Cox Remix), Bullet:Dodge
- 2012: The Scumfrog & Sting – "If I Ever Lose My Faith" (Carl Cox Remix), Armada Recordings
- 2013: Davide Squillace & Guti – "The Other Side of Hustler" (Carl Cox Remix), This And That
- 2015: Pan-Pot – "Riot" (Carl Cox Remix), Second State
- 2016: Steve Mulder vs. D-Shake – "Techno Trance 2016" (Carl Cox Remix), Orange Recordings
- 2016: Popof featuring Arno Joey – "Lidl Girl" (Carl Cox Collective Remix), Hot Creations
- 2016: Josh Abrahams – "The Traveller" (Carl Cox Remix), Bush Records
- 2016: Josh Wink – "I'm Talking to You" (Carl Cox Remix), Intec Records
- 2018: Alex Mine - "Lost" (Carl Cox Remix)
- 2019: Purple Disco Machine - "Body Funk" (Carl Cox Remix), A Positiva / Virgin EMI Records
- 2019: Awex - "It's Our Future" (Carl Cox's Ultimate Mix), Plastic City
- 2019: Danny Tenaglia - "Don't Turn Your Back" (Carl Cox Remix), Hot Creations
- 2019: Phuture - "Acid Tracks" (Carl Cox Remix), Afro Acid
- 2019: Deetron - "Photon" (Carl Cox Remix), Character
- 2020: Roel Salemink - "Eskes" (Carl Cox Pure Remix), Intec Digital
- 2020: Russell Small x DNO P. x Reigns - "It Is What It Is (Bad Ass Disco)" (Carl Cox DnB Remix), Jango Music
- 2020: Hannah Wants & Kevin Knapp - "Call Me" (Carl Cox Remix), Toolroom Productions
- 2020: deadmau5 & The Neptunes - "Pomegranate" (Carl Cox Remix), Mau5Trap
- 2020: Kenneth Bager - "Farmacia (Homage To Frankfurt)" (Carl Cox Remix), Armada Music
- 2020: Tom Wax - "In Techno We Trust" (Carl Cox Remix), Phuture Wax Records
- 2021: Deborah De Luca - "Fuori" (Carl Cox Remix), Solamente
- 2021: Joseph Capriati - "Goa" (Carl Cox Remix), REDIMENSION
- 2021: Geraldine Hunt - "Can't Fake the Feeling" (Carl Cox Rework), Unidisc Music
- 2021: Sofi Tukker - "Drinkee" (Carl Cox Remix), Ultra Records
- 2021: Future Islands - "City's Face" (Carl Cox Remix), 4AD
- 2022: Radio Slave - "Stay Out All Night" (Carl Cox Remix), Rekids
- 2022: Burns - "Talamanca" (Carl Cox Remix), FFRR Records
- 2022: Riva Starr - "Maria" (Carl Cox Remix), Snatch! Records
- 2022: Denis A - "BEON1X" (Carl Cox Remix), DAR
- 2023: Nicole Moudaber - "Intentionally" (Carl Cox Remix), MOOD
- 2023: Capricorn - "20HZ" (Carl Cox Remix), R&S Records
- 2023: Inner City - "Say Something" (Carl Cox Remix), KMS Records
