= Ramirez =

Ramirez may refer to:

== People ==
- Ramírez (surname), people with the surname
- Ramirez (footballer), Washington Ramirez Cruz Santos (born 1987), Brazilian midfielder
- Ramirez (rapper), Ivan Ramirez (born 1994), American rapper

== Locations ==
- Ramirez, Texas
- Ramirez Canyon Park, Malibu, California
- Ramirez Island, Chile
- Diego Ramírez Islands, Chile
- Ramirez, a barangay of Magallanes, Cavite

== Companies ==
- Conservas Ramirez, a Portuguese canned fish producer company
- Ramírez Guitars, Spanish luthiers

== Other uses ==
- Ramirez (band), Croatian rock band
- Juan Sánchez Villa-Lobos Ramírez, a character from the Highlander film series
- Ramirez (Skies of Arcadia), a character from the video game Skies of Arcadia
