= American Recordings (record label) =

American record label

American Recordings, LLC
- Parent company: Universal Music Group
- Founded: 1988; 38 years ago
- Founder: Rick Rubin
- Distributors: Republic (United States); Fiction/EMI (United Kingdom); Universal Music Enterprises (reissues) Sony Music (System of a Down only)
- Genre: Rock; heavy metal; hip-hop; country; blues
- Country of origin: United States
- Location: Los Angeles, California
- Official website: www.umgcatalog.com

American Recordings (formerly Def American Recordings, Inc.) is an American record label headed by producer Rick Rubin. The label has featured artists such as Slayer, the Black Crowes, ZZ Top, Danzig, Trouble, Tom Petty, Johnny Cash, The Mother Hips, and System of a Down.

== Company history ==
The rarely seen original Def American logo. Note its resemblance to the Def Jam Recordings logo.

The label Def American Recordings was founded after Rick Rubin left Def Jam Recordings in 1988. Among the first acts to be signed were Slayer (which followed Rubin from Def Jam), Danzig, The Four Horsemen, Masters of Reality, and Wolfsbane, as well as indie rockers the Jesus and Mary Chain and controversial stand-up comedian Andrew Dice Clay. Rubin continued his association with hip-hop music as well by signing artists such as the Geto Boys and Sir Mix-a-Lot. Def American had its first major success with The Black Crowes' 1990 debut album, Shake Your Money Maker, which was eventually certified quintuple platinum by the RIAA. The group's 1992 follow-up, The Southern Harmony and Musical Companion, gave the label its first No.1 album. Rapper Sir Mix-a-Lot obtained a number-one hit with the song "Baby Got Back" as well as a platinum-selling album titled Mack Daddy. Heavy metal acts Slayer and Danzig also enjoyed notable commercial success, with Slayer in particular having several gold-certified albums. Rubin produced many of the recordings on the label, as well as directing other related ventures.

Rubin changed the name of the company from Def American Recordings to American Recordings in 1993 after reportedly seeing the word "def" in the dictionary. The company was reportedly renamed because he believed that finding the word in a notable source was against the anti-establishment image that he was trying to project. A mock funeral was held for the word "def" on August 27, 1993, at Hollywood Memorial Park (now Hollywood Forever Cemetery). The guest list included Black Panthers with prop shotguns, The Amazing Kreskin, Tom Petty and Rosanna Arquette, The Red Hot Chili Peppers' Flea, Sir Mix-a-Lot, and Warner Bros. Records chairman (and pallbearer) Mo Ostin, with Reverend Al Sharpton presiding. Before "def" was lowered to its final resting place, some of the 1,500+ mourners placed flowers and various musical and personal memorabilia in the open casket. Afterwards, mourners followed a 19th-century-style horse-drawn hearse and a six-piece brass band playing "Amazing Grace" to the after party—named Ciao Def—at a bowling alley.

American had several sub-labels over the years, including Onion Records, Ill Labels, Wild West, Whte Lbls, and Infinite Zero. The last was a partnership with Henry Rollins that specialized in reissues of obscure albums. None of these labels made the distribution transition after American Recordings left Warner Bros. Records in 1997, and its recordings were deleted.

== Distribution ==
The first Def American release was Reign in Blood by Slayer, which had a Def Jam Recordings logo on its first pressing. Fans of heavy metal music consider it one of the most critically acclaimed and important albums in the genre's history, and it continues to obtain much high praise from fans and critics. A Def Jam Recordings logo was also present on its follow-up album. However, because Russell Simmons felt that Slayer's music was not in line with Def Jam, and because Def Jam's then-distributor Columbia Records refused to release it, it was released through Geffen Records, and Rubin took the rights of the release to the new label with him after the split. Danzig's 1988 debut album was the first release to bear the Def American logo. Initially, the label was distributed by Geffen through Warner Bros. Records (now known as Warner Records), but when Geffen refused to distribute the self-titled album by the Geto Boys and the controversy it caused, distribution was absorbed by Warner Bros. proper, which released all subsequent Def American titles.

American's distribution has been handled through several labels over the years. American's first incarnation was distributed by Geffen Records through Warner Bros. Records from 1988 to 1990. After a falling-out with Geffen over the content of the Geto Boys' only Def American release, Warner Bros. itself took over distribution duties from 1990 to 1997 in the United States, while the international distribution was handled by BMG. However, sub-label Ill Labels was distributed by hip-hop specialist and former Warner Bros. subsidiary Tommy Boy Records as part of its deal. For a brief time during the 1990s, the label also distributed Too Pure Records in the US.

Rubin signed a distribution deal with Columbia Records in 1997, which distributed the label's titles until 2001. That year, Universal Music Group, through its Island Def Jam Music Group division, took over distribution. In 2005, with the exception of the recordings of Johnny Cash, the label returned to the aegis of Warner Bros. Records. Non-US distribution was handled by Sony Music Entertainment until the deal with Columbia expired.

In 2007, Warner Bros. Records, which was American's home from 1990 to 1997, acquired the rights to the extensive American Recordings catalog, which included Johnny Cash, The Black Crowes, The Jayhawks, Slayer, and Danzig. However, American's current roster (except Tom Petty) was transferred to BMG successor Sony BMG (now known as Sony Music Entertainment) in mid-2007 after a legal battle between Warner and Rubin over the details of their former arrangement, in which American Recordings would sign and provide creative services for artists, while Warner Bros. was only to handle promotion, sales, marketing, and distribution because Rubin was prompted to move his label with his appointment to co-chairman of Columbia Records in the spring of 2007.

In 2012, Rick Rubin, upon his exit from Sony Music Entertainment, signed a new deal with Universal Republic Records (now Republic Records) for a new incarnation of American Recordings. The first albums to be released under this new deal were ZZ Top's La Futura and The Avett Brothers' The Carpenter. During this period, American moved all of its catalog to Universal Music Group, the exceptions being System of a Down, which remained with Columbia Records and Sony Music Entertainment, plus Chino XL's Here To Save You All and Tom Petty's Highway Companion, which remained with Warner Records and Warner Music Group.

== Current artists ==
- The Avett Brothers
- Bear1boss
- Band of Horses
- Denny Weston Jr.
- Kae Tempest
- Marcus King
- System of a Down
- ZZ Top
- Alex Amen

== Former artists ==
- American Head Charge
- Dan Baird
- Barkmarket
- Frank Black
- The Black Crowes
- Blackeyed Susans
- Johnny Cash
- Chino XL
- Andrew "Dice" Clay
- Julian Cope
- Danzig
- Deconstruction
- Digital Orgasm (Whte Lbls/American)
- DJ Kool
- Donovan
- Pete Droge
- Electric Company (Onion/American)
- Fireside
- Flipper
- The Four Horsemen
- The Freewheelers
- John Frusciante
- Geto Boys
- God Dethroned
- God Lives Underwater
- Gogol Bordello
- The Jayhawks
- The Jesus and Mary Chain
- Kwest tha Madd Lad
- Nusrat Fateh Ali Khan
- Laika
- Lords of Acid (Whte Lbls/American)
- Lordz of Brooklyn (Ventrue/American)
- Loudermilk
- Love and Rockets
- Luna Halo
- Manmade God
- Masters of Reality
- MC 900 Ft. Jesus
- Medicine
- Messiah (Whte Lbls/American)
- Milk
- The Mother Hips
- Mouse on Mars (Too Pure/American)
- Noise Ratchet
- The Nonce (Wild West/American)
- Ours
- Paloalto
- Jonny Polonsky
- Pram
- Psychotica
- Raging Slab
- The Red Devils
- The Jim Rose Circus Sideshow
- Ruth Ruth
- Sir Mix-a-Lot (Rhyme Cartel/American)
- Skinny Puppy
- Slayer
- Stiffs, Inc.
- Supreme Love Gods
- Survival Research Laboratories
- Swell
- Thee Hypnotics
- Th' Faith Healers
- Thomas Jefferson Slave Apartments
- Trouble
- Unida
- Saul Williams
- Wesley Willis
- Wolfsbane

=== Soundtracks ===
- Big Daddy
- Chef Aid: The South Park Album
- The Doom Generation
- Jackass: The Movie

=== Infinite Zero Reissue Artists ===
- James Chance And The Contortions
- Devo
- Flipper
- Gang of Four
- Louise Huebner
- Iceberg Slim
- Mississippi Fred McDowell
- The Monks
- Matthew Shipp
- Trouble Funk
- Alan Vega
- Tom Verlaine
- Alan Watts
- James White and the Blacks

== See also ==
- List of record labels
