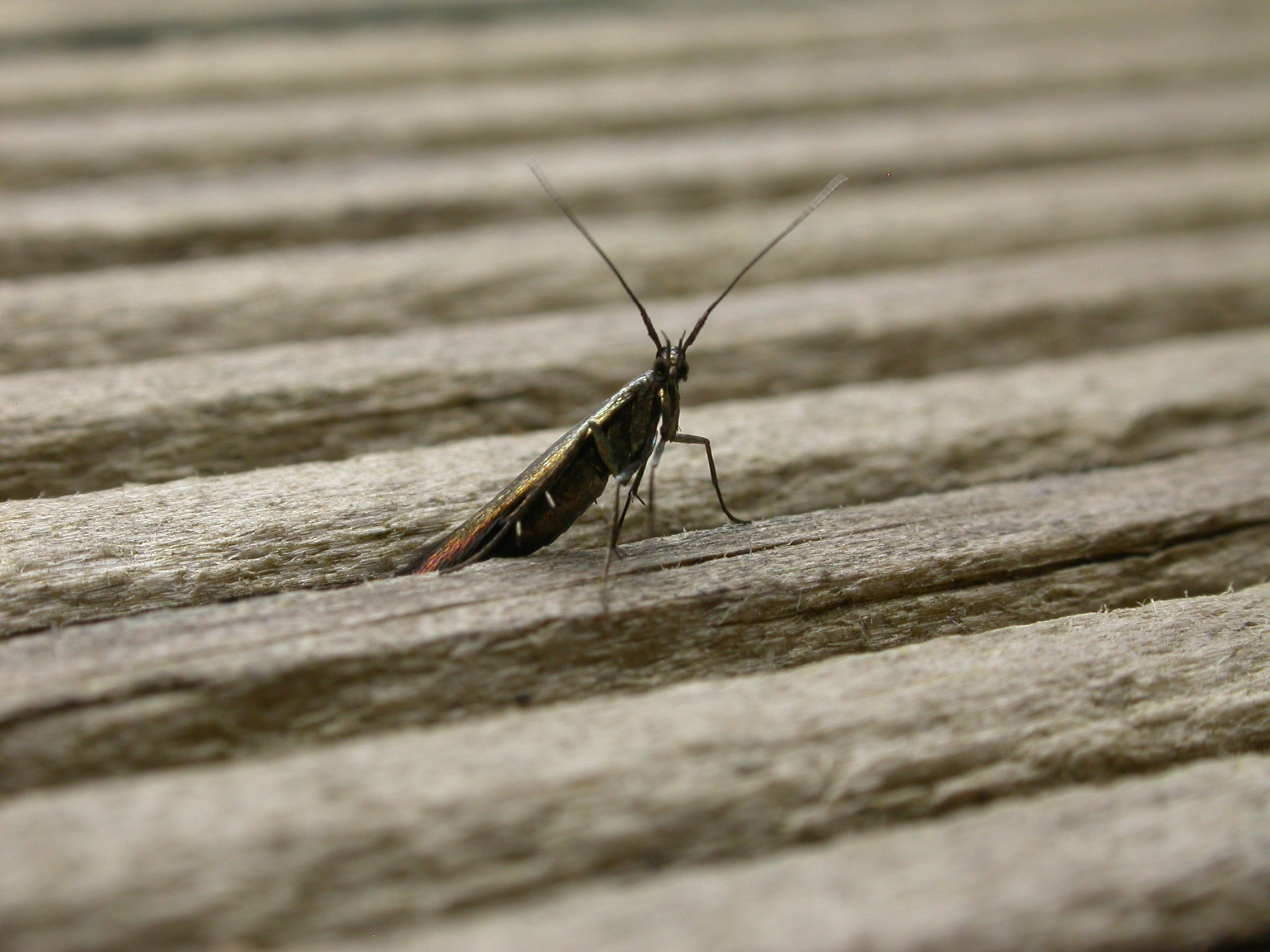

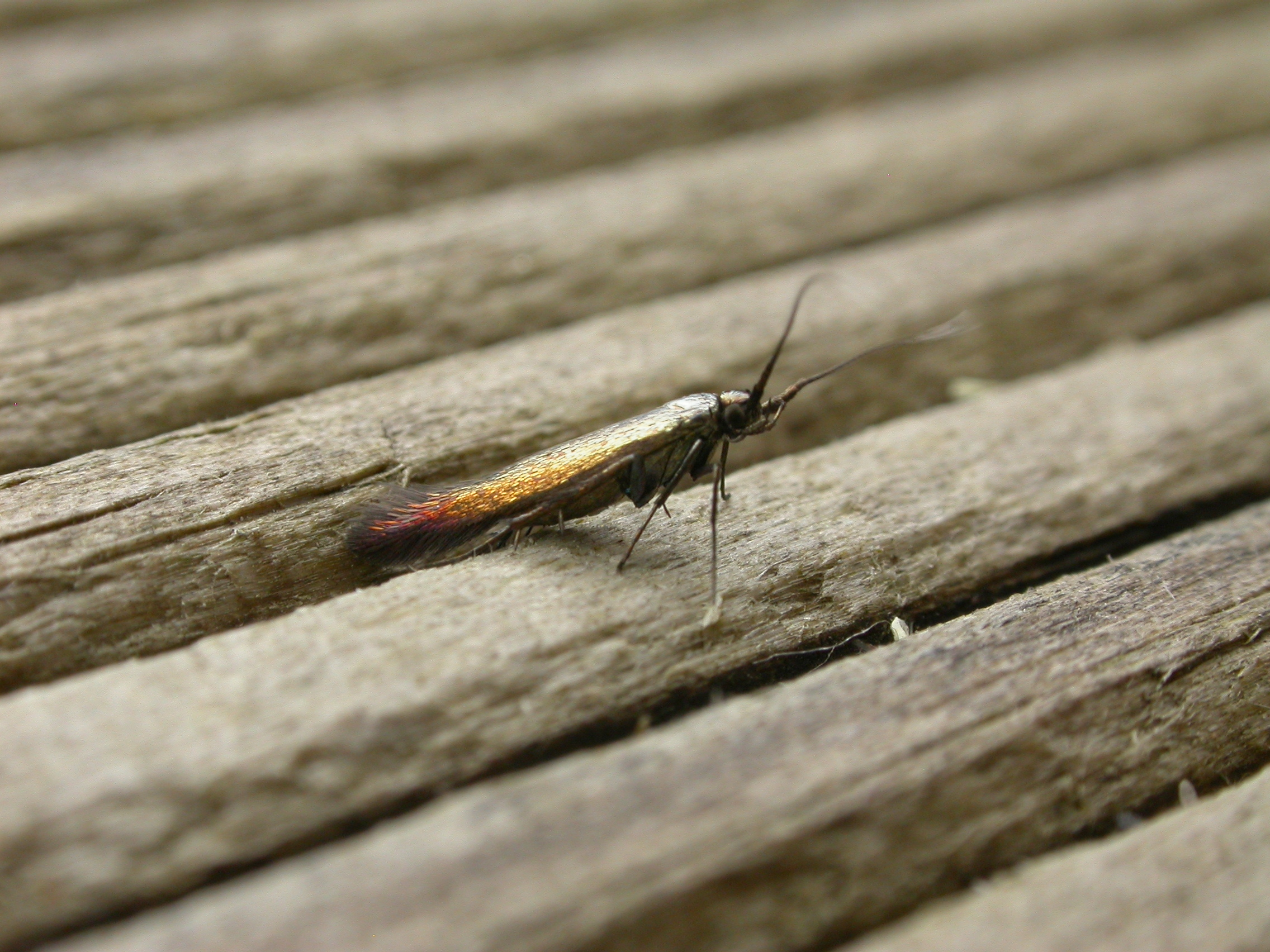

Scientific classification
- Kingdom: Animalia
- Phylum: Arthropoda
- Clade: Pancrustacea
- Class: Insecta
- Order: Lepidoptera
- Family: Coleophoridae
- Genus: Coleophora
- Species: C. alcyonipennella

Binomial name
- Coleophora alcyonipennella (Kollar, 1832)

Synonyms
- Ornix alcyonipennella Kollar, 1832; Coleophora cuprifulgella Toll, 1962

= Coleophora alcyonipennella =

Species of moth

Coleophora alcyonipennella, the clover case-bearer or small clover case-bearer, is a moth of the family Coleophoridae. It is native to Asia, Europe and North Africa, and has been introduced to Australia and New Zealand.

== Description ==
The wingspan is 12–14 mm. Adults are on wing in May and June and again in late July and August in two generations in western Europe. Adults feed on the nectar of clover flowers.

The larvae feed on Trifolium repens and Trifolium fragiferum. They feed inside a case formed from a floret. Larvae have also been recorded on Medicago species.

== Distribution ==
It is native to Europe, the eastern Palearctic realm, Pakistan, the Near East, and North Africa. It is an introduced species in New Zealand and Australia, where it is now found from southern Queensland to Victoria, South Australia and Tasmania.
