= Peter G. Levine =

American medical researcher (1960–2022)

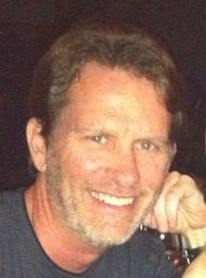
- Born: December 22, 1960; New York City, US
- Died: January 8, 2022 (aged 61)
- Education: George Mason University B.A. 1986; Union County College A.A.S. 1996
- Occupations: Medical researcher science educator
- Known for: Stronger After Stroke
- Medical career
- Institutions: Sinclair Community College PTA Program 2018-present Ohio State B.R.A.I.N. lab 2011-2018; U. Cincinnati--Medicine 2002-11; Kessler 1999-2002; VA Medical Ctr (East Orange, NJ) 1999-2002
- Research: Stroke recovery
- Awards: Ohio Physical Therapy (2011); Model Practice Award (2008); Best Platform Presentation

Peter G. Levine (December 22, 1960 – January 8, 2022) was an American medical researcher, science educator, and authority on stroke recovery. He published articles on brain plasticity as it relates to stroke, with emphasis on modified constraint induced therapy, cortical reorganization, telerehabilitation, electrical stimulation, electromyography-triggered stimulation, mental practice, cortical plasticity, acquired brain injury, spasticity, sensation recovery, evidence-based practice, outcome measures, and others. His 2013 book Stronger After Stroke is regarded as an authoritative guide for patients and therapists dealing with stroke. The book has received numerous positive reviews, and has been translated into Indonesian, Japanese, and Korean. His seminars throughout the United States were described by one reviewer as "funny, entertaining, engaging, dynamic, well organized, passionate and lighthearted." Levine was a trainer of stroke-specific outcome measures for The Ohio State University; B.R.A.I.N. Lab. He was a researcher and co-director at the Neuromotor Recovery and Rehabilitation Laboratory at the University of Cincinnati College of Medicine. Before that, he was a researcher at the Human Performance & Motion Analysis Laboratory, which is the research arm of the Kessler Institute for Rehabilitation.

== Early life ==
Levine's father, Martin Levine, was an IBM-trained systems analyst. The Levine family moved constantly, with Peter attending 14 different schools from kindergarten to college, including Lanikai Elementary in Honolulu, Hawaii; the Overseas School of Rome; and during high school, the Community School in Tehran. In 1979, the family was in the mass evacuation of Americans from Tehran using U.S. C141A military transports from Mehrabad Airport. After graduating from George Mason University, Levine moved to Austin, Texas, in 1987, and joined the grunge band Flowerhead shortly thereafter.

== Personal life ==
Levine lived in Cincinnati, Ohio, with his Finnish-born wife and physical therapist Aila Mella. They had two children.

== Publications ==
=== Books ===
- Stronger After Stroke by Peter G. Levine, Demos Medical Publishing, New York (2009 1st ed., 2012 2nd ed. 2018 3rd ed.); Indonesian version, Depok publishers (2011); Japanese version, GAIABOOKS publishers (2014), Korean version, Freedom to Dream Seoul Medical Books.

=== Selected articles ===
- "Reps" Aren't Enough: Augmenting Functional Electrical Stimulation With Behavioral Supports Significantly Reduces Impairment in Moderately Impaired Stroke. Page SJ, Levine PG, Basobas BA. Arch Phys Med Rehabil. 2016
- Mental practice—triggered electrical stimulation in chronic, moderate, upper-extremity hemiparesis after stroke. Page SJ, Levine P, Hill V. Am J Occup Ther. 2015 Jan-Feb.
- Upper-Extremity, Stroke-Specific Testing: Are Lab Tested, Stroke-Specific Outcome Measures Ready For Clinical Prime Time? Levine P. Physical Disabilities Special Interest Section Quarterly / American Occupational Therapy Association. 2009
- Mental practice in chronic stroke results of a randomized, placebo-controlled trial, SJ Page, P Levine, A Leonard, Stroke 38 (4), 1293-1297 Cited by: 295; Publication year: 2007
- Efficacy of modified constraint-induced movement therapy in chronic stroke: a single-blinded randomized controlled trial, SJ Page, SA Sisto, P Levine, RE McGrath, Archives of Physical Medicine and Rehabilitation 85 (1), 14-18, Cited by 292: Publication year 2004
- Mental practice combined with physical practice for upper-limb motor deficit in subacute stroke, SJ Page, P Levine, SA Sisto, MV Johnston, Physical Therapy 81 (8), 1455-1462, Cited by 228; published 2001
- Effects of mental practice on affected limb use and function in chronic stroke, SJ Page, P Levine, AC Leonard, Archives of Physical Medicine and Rehabilitation 86 (3), 399-402, Cited by: 202; Published 2005
- Modified constraint induced therapy: a randomized feasibility and efficacy study, SJ Page, S Sisto, P Levine, MV Johnston, M Hughes, Journal of rehabilitation research and development 38 (5), 583-590, Cited by: 201 2001
- Stroke patients' and therapists' opinions of constraint-induced movement therapy, SJ Page, P Levine, S Sisto, Q Bond, MV Johnston, Clinical rehabilitation 16 (1), 55-60, Cited by: 191; Published 2002
- Modified constraint-induced therapy in acute stroke: a randomized controlled pilot study, SJ Page, P Levine, AC Leonard, Neurorehabilitation and Neural Repair 19 (1), 27-32, Cited by: 188; Published 2005
- Modified constraint-induced therapy after subacute stroke: a preliminary study, SJ Page, SA Sisto, MV Johnston, P Levine, Neurorehabilitation and Neural Repair 16 (3), 290-295, Cited by: 152; Published 2002
- Modified constraint-induced therapy in chronic stroke: results of a single-blinded randomized controlled trial, SJ Page, P Levine, A Leonard, JP Szaflarski, BM Kissela, Physical therapy 88 (3), 333-340, Cited by: 127; Published 2008
- Modified constraint-induced therapy in chronic stroke, SJ Page, SA Sisto, P Levine, American journal of physical medicine & rehabilitation 81 (11), 870-875, Cited by: 90 2002
- Modified constraint-induced therapy in subacute stroke: a case report, SJ Page, SA Sisto, MV Johnston, P Levine, M Hughes, Archives of Physical Medicine and Rehabilitation 83 (2), 286-290, Cited by: 85 2002
- Cortical reorganization following modified constraint-induced movement therapy: a study of 4 patients with chronic stroke, JP Szaflarski, SJ Page, BM Kissela, JH Lee, P Levine, SM Strakowski, Archives of Physical Medicine and Rehabilitation 87 (8), 1052-1058, Cited by: 80; Published 2006
