= ...Ka-Bloom! =

Studio album by Flowerhead
- Released: 1992
- Studio: Smart
- Genres: Alternative rock, psychedelic rock
- Length: 46:08
- Label: Zoo
- Producer: Flowerhead

Flowerhead chronology
Turmoil in the Toybox EP (1990)	...Ka-Bloom! (1992)	The People's Fuzz (1995)

...Ka-Bloom! is the debut album by the American rock band Flowerhead, released in 1992. It sold around 9,000 copies in its first year of release.

The band supported the album by touring first with Ned's Atomic Dustbin, and then with Blind Melon.

== Production ==
The album was produced by the band; they had tried to enlist John Paul Jones to produce, but he did not have an opening in his schedule. It was recorded at Smart Studios, in Madison, Wisconsin.

...Ka-Bloom!'s final track, "Sunflower", runs for another 14 minutes past its listed length.

== Critical reception ==
Professional ratings
Review scores
Source	Rating
Calgary Herald	B−
Los Angeles Daily News	3/4 stars

Trouser Press wrote: "Replete with too many long songs—most of them of the sterile, neo-psychedelia-cum-'70s-stadium-shaker variety—...ka-BLOOM! is background music for the indiscriminate stoner, as common-sounding as a car horn." The Chicago Tribune opined that "the acid-drenched atmosphere and molten riffing are throwbacks to the dawn of metal." The Calgary Herald wryly noted that "it's like the '60s meet Flaming Lips meet Jesus Jones meet thundering guitars blessed by Timothy Leary meet just about anybody who's ever copped an acid-rock lick." The Los Angeles Daily News praised the "highly imaginative" guitarist Eric Schmitz."

The Sun Sentinel concluded that "although ...ka-Bloom! is abundant with powerful, raw guitar riffs; although there are one or two songs, like 'Sunflower', that may be successful singles; although the so-far-uninspiring band has definite potential; this 60-minute track doesn't sound any different from what's out there already." The Ottawa Citizen determined that "high points (excuse the pun) from this appealingly ragged garage-type boogie band are the groove tunes—'Acid Reign', 'All Along the Way', and 'What?!'" The Province deemed it "big guitar rock with psychedelic droning and syncopated drumming... English conceit; American muscle." The Fort Worth Star-Telegram declared that Flowerhead "is the most ill-talented, deplorable band that's ever coasted out of Austin's music scene onto a major label."

== Track listing ==
No.	Title	Length
1.	"Acid Reign"	5:07
2.	"All Along the Way"	2:50
3.	"Thunderjeep"	5:51
4.	"Snagglepuss"	5:44
5.	"Everything Is Beautiful"	3:30
6.	"Oh Shane"	7:22
7.	"What?!"	3:46
8.	"Coffee"	6:40
9.	"Sunflower"	5:18
Total length:		46:08

Bonus track
No.	Title	Length
10.	Untitled (bonus track)	14:00
Total length:		60:08

== Personnel ==
- Eric Schmitz – vocals, guitar
- Pete Levine – drums, vocals
- Eric Faust – bass, vocals
- Buz Zoller – guitar
- Pauli Ryan – percussion
