= Give Me All Your Loving =

Give Me All Your Loving or similar may refer to:

- "Give Me All Your Loving", a song by Sunforest from Sound of Sunforest
- "Give Me All Your Lovin'", a song by 3T from Brotherhood
- "Give Me All Your Lovin'", a song by The Fabulous Thunderbirds from Butt Rockin'
- "Give Me All Your Luvin'", a song by Madonna
- "Gimme All Your Lovin'", a song by ZZ Top

== See also ==
- "Gimme All Your Lovin' or I Will Kill You", a song by Macy Gray
- Give Me All Your Love (disambiguation)
