= Supreme Love Gods =

- Origin: Fresno, California
- Genres: Alternative rock, neo-psychedelia, baggy
- Years active: 1990-1993, 2008
- Labels: Def American, Columbia, One Little Indian, Beggars Banquet
- Past members: Thomas Dew; Tommy Joy; Lance Carlos; John Wilson; Eric Dansby

Supreme Love Gods were an alternative rock group from Fresno, California, active from 1990 to 1993.

They signed with Columbia/SME in 1991 and released an EP in Britain titled Righteous on One Little Indian later that year. Early the next year, the group was dropped from Columbia, and bassist Lance Carlos left the group, to be replaced by John Wilson. The band’s only full-length release was a self-titled album, issued on Def American in 1992. "Souled Out" was released as a single and hit No. 16 on the U.S. Billboard Modern Rock Tracks chart. The group toured with Ned's Atomic Dustbin, 808 State, Flowerhead, and Meat Beat Manifesto in 1993. The band began working on a new album in 1993 but broke up while recording it.

Singer Thomas Dew went on to form the band A Million Seeds. Drummer Eric Dansby went on to play in The Shroud. In 1995 guitarist/keyboardist Tommy Joy formed Pusher and released the album Problems on indie label Oblivion Records.

In 1995 John Wilson became a member of Meat Beat Manifesto.

In 2008 Supreme Love Gods got together for a reunion show in their home town of Fresno, California.

In 2020 at the beginning of the COVID-19 pandemic, Tommy Joy started remixing "Souled Out" with the purpose of raising money to support charities helping people affected by the pandemic. After recruiting other indie bands to contribute musically to the mixes, One Little Indian Recordings got on board to release the remixes as an EP with all proceeds going to Crew Nation. The EP is scheduled to be released on vinyl in June 2021.

== Members ==
- Thomas Dew - vocals, guitar
- Tommy Joy - guitar, keyboards
- Lance Burger - bass
- Eric Dansby - drums
- John Wilson - bass
