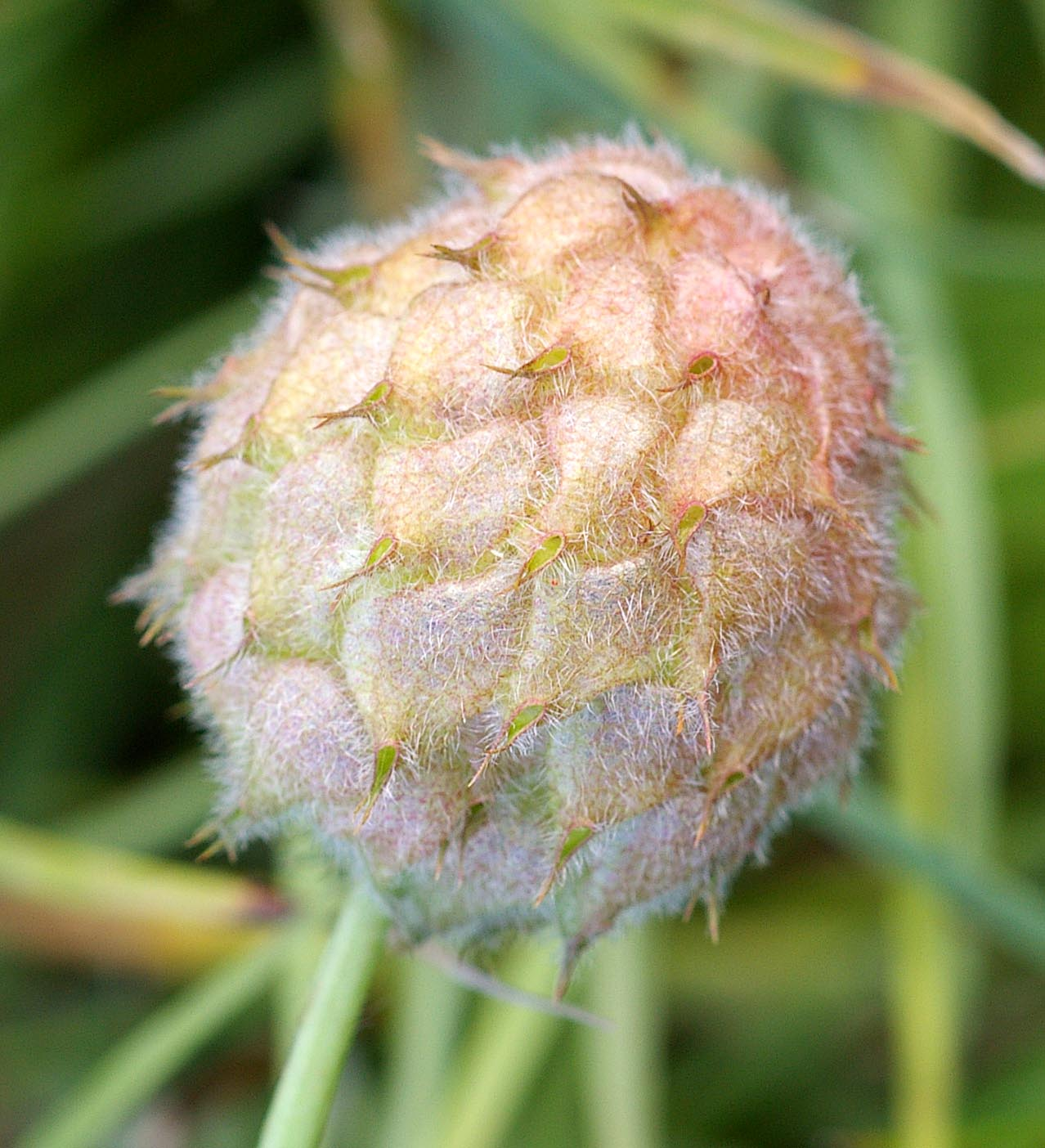

Scientific classification
- Kingdom: Plantae
- Clade: Tracheophytes
- Clade: Angiosperms
- Clade: Eudicots
- Clade: Rosids
- Order: Fabales
- Family: Fabaceae
- Subfamily: Faboideae
- Genus: Trifolium
- Species: T. fragiferum

Binomial name
- Trifolium fragiferum L.

Varieties
- Trifolium fragiferum var. fragiferum; Trifolium fragiferum var. orthodon Zohary

Synonyms
- List: Amoria fragifera (L.) Roskov (1990); Galearia fragifera (L.) C.Presl (1831); Xerosphaera fragifera (L.) Soják (1985)

= Trifolium fragiferum =

Plant species in the pea family

Trifolium fragiferum, the strawberry clover, is a herbaceous perennial plant species in the bean family Fabaceae.

The species is native to Eurasia and parts of Africa. It is present in other places, such as sections of North America, as an introduced species. It is also cultivated as a cover crop and for hay and silage, as green manure, and as a bee plant.

== Description ==
Strawberry clover is a perennial herb with tough roots. It typically grows about 10 centimetres (4 in) tall but the much-branched stems can reach 40 cm (16 in) in length, rooting at the nodes to form patches up to 80 cm (31 in) across. The leaves are arranged alternately along the stems, with a 1.5-cm petiole and narrow stipules at its base, about 2 cm long. Each leaf has three oval leaflets, each about 2 cm x 1 cm, with prominent veins that reach the edge of the leaflet at the tips of the pointed teeth. The whole plant is glabrous or sparsely hairy.

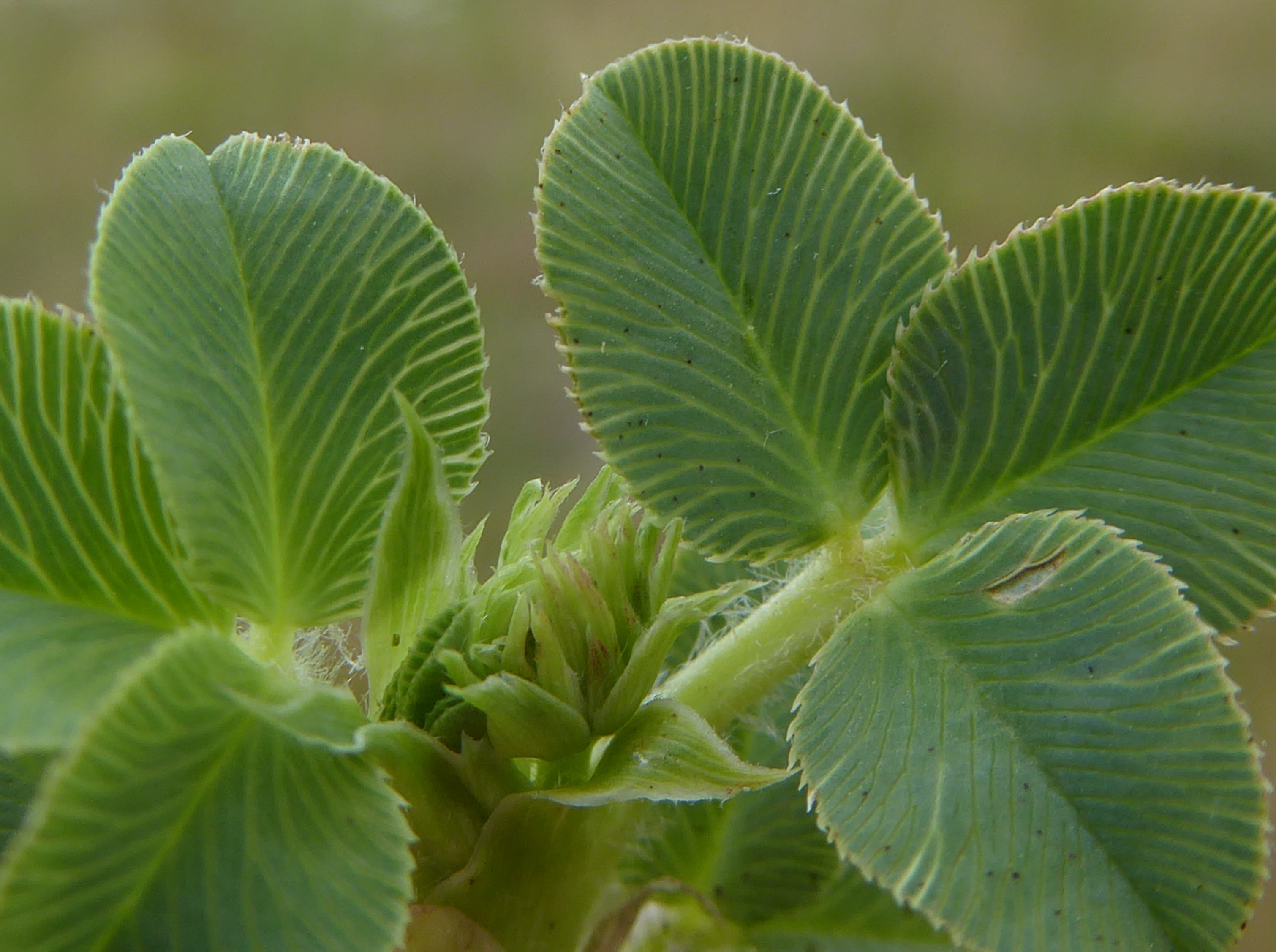
Leaves of strawberry clover, showing the distinctive veins

The inflorescences arise from the leaf axils and have numerous small flowers clustered into a round head up to about 1.5 cm in diameter. The peduncles are up to 2 cm long, while the pedicels of the individual flowers are very short. At the base of the flowerhead are involucral bracts about 2 millimetres (1/8 in) long, and at the base of each flower another tiny bract about 0.5 mm long. The flower corollas are white, turning pink, 7 mm (1/4 in) long, with ten stamens and one style. The fruit is particularly distinctive; the calyx ripening to form a pinkish ball with a reticulate surface somewhat resembling a strawberry. Each fruit (of which there are many in each flowerhead) contains 2 small, brown seeds about 1.5 mm long.

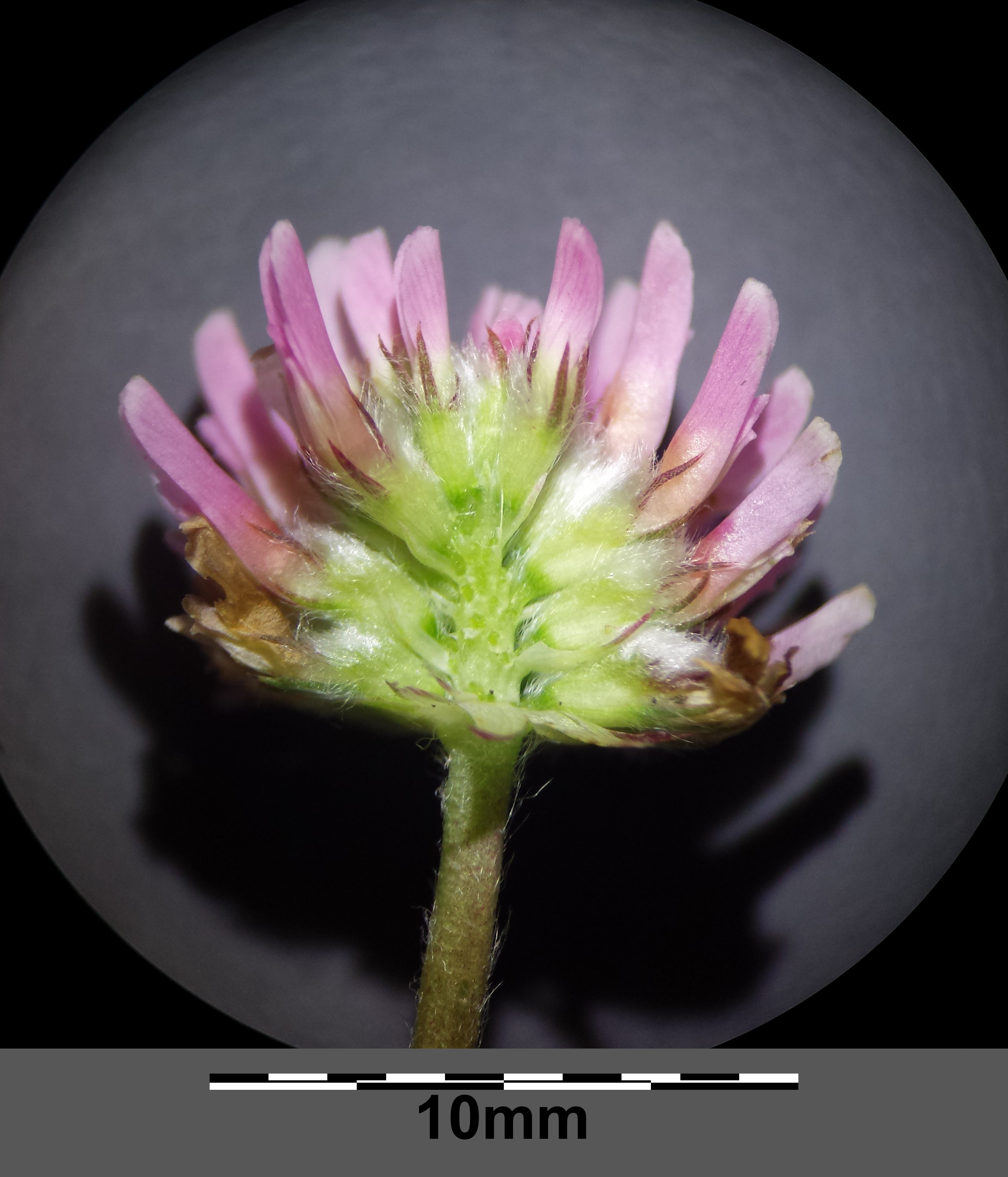
Section across the flowerhead

== Distribution and habitat ==
It is a herbaceous perennial plant species in the bean family Fabaceae. It is native to Europe, Asia, and parts of Africa. It is present in other places, such as sections of North America, as an introduced species.

== Uses ==
Strawberry clover is cultivated as a cover crop and for hay and silage, as green manure, and as a bee plant. It is good for cover on flood-prone lands or areas with soil salinity. It is known as a weed in some areas. Several agricultural cultivars have been developed, including 'Salina', 'Palestine', and 'Fresa'.
