= Mentor Huebner =

American painter

Mentor Huebner (July 19, 1917 - March 19, 2001) was a leading Hollywood production illustrator who did storyboards, production art and creative concepts for more than 250 films, including King Kong (1976), Blade Runner (1982) and Francis Ford Coppola's Dracula (1992).

His early work was uncredited on Fiddler on the Roof (1971), The Time Machine (1960), Ben-Hur (1959), North by Northwest (1959), Forbidden Planet (1956), Quo Vadis (1951) and Strangers on a Train (1951).

As a fine artist, Huebner painted landscapes, seascapes, cityscapes and portraits, creating some 2000 paintings and exhibiting in 50 one-man shows. He also taught art as an instructor at Chouinard Art Institute.

== See also ==
- List of illustrators
