= Louise Huebner =

American astrologer

- Born: March 22, 1930; New York City, New York, United States of America
- Died: September 1, 2014 (aged 84); Los Angeles, California
- Occupations: Psychic, Radio and Television Astrologer, writer, mystic, Entertainer, Official Witch of Los Angeles County
- Spouse: Mentor Huebner

Louise Huebner (March 22, 1930 – September 1, 2014) was an American author of occult books, astrologer, and the only officially appointed Official Witch in the entire world. She was given the title of "Official Witch of Los Angeles County" from the supervisor of the third district of Los Angeles County in 1968 during a series of summer concerts sponsored by her at the Hollywood Bowl, in Hollywood, Los Angeles.

== Early life and education ==
Louise Huebner was born in New York in 1930, and her career as a psychic began when she was only ten years old, when she began to give palm readings at a children's carnival. She was what today is defined an "Hereditary Witch" as she learned witchcraft from her grandmother and her mother who were both witches too, and taught her the craft in her early years. She was a sixth generation witch, and a third generation astrologer. She studied from private tutors, and she was able to speak many different languages including Latin, French, and Italian.

== Radio and Television ==
When Louise Huebner moved to Los Angeles, she opened an office as an astrologer and through the 1960s she gained local fame as a psychic and was a frequent guest on radio and television shows. She appeared regularly on a talk show on radio station KLAC for four years (1965–69). Occasionally she was invited to assist in crime detection. Huebner participated in different episodes of The Johnny Carson Show and The Joey Bishop Show. She also had her own space in various popular Journals and newspapers.

== The Official Witch of Los Angeles County ==
The designation of "Official Witch" took place in 1968 at the Hollywood Bowl, in Hollywood, California, when the Los Angeles Department of Parks and Recreation asked her to help them promote a series of concerts at the Hollywood Bowl. The invitation was extended because she had produced festivities in fourteen separate communities for a Los Angeles Birthday celebration, so the county asked her to do for them what she had done for the city, that was to generate tremendous positive media exposure for it, good publicity.

The Hollywood Bowl was planning a series of 12 summer concerts for Sunday afternoons, which the title was "Twelve Summer Sunday Concerts at the Hollywood Bowl". The first concert they had planned which opened the season in the summer of 1968 was called "Folklore Day". She cast a spell to increase the sexual vitality of the entire County. At that time Los Angeles County had 78 Cities. She was given the official title of "Official Witch of Los Angeles County", right one week before the spellcast took place. She was given a legal document, a certificate that stated she was designated that way because of her supernatural powers. The certificate was affixed with the County Seal and was signed by the chairman of the Board of County Supervisors, at that time, Ernest Debs. On the day of the event, 11.000 people were at the Hollywood Bowl for the Spellcast. Red candles, salt and garlic were distributed to people who chanted all together a spell led by Louise Huebner on stage. Members of the neo-pagan Wiccan movement were somewhat upset by Louise Huebner, for she was not a part of their emerging movement, and tended to perpetuate what they felt were negative stereotypes of witches.

== Personal life ==
Louise Huebner was married to the conceptual and storyboard artist for motion pictures Mentor Huebner. They had three children, and travelled around Europe through the 1960s. In 1970 Louise Huebner operated as a public psychic and witch and traveled to Salem, Massachusetts, where the mayor presented her with a broom. She produced one record album, two books, and a series of mini-books for Hallmark Cards. By the mid-1970s, however, she had largely retired from public life, and for a period she operated an antique shop in Pasadena, California.

== Bibliography ==
- Power through Witchcraft - Nash Publishing, 1969. (Reprinted by Solar Press in 2023.)
- Never Strike a Happy Medium - Nash Publishing, 1971.
- Your Future - It's in the cards - Springbok Editions, 1972.
- Magical Creatures - Springbok Editions, 1972.
- Magical Candles, Enchanted Plants and Powerful Gems - Springbok Editions, 1972.
- Magic Sleep - Springbok Editions, 1972.
- In the Palm of your Hand - Springbok Editions, 1972.
- Your Lucky Numbers - Springbok Editions, 1972.
- Superstitions - Springbok Editions, 1972.
- Moon Magic - Springbok Editions, 1972.
- Love Spells from A to Z: Witchy Things for Brewing Up Romance - Springbok Editions, 1972.

== Recordings ==
- SEDUCTION THROUGH WITCHCRAFT. - Warner Bros. Recordings. - Solo. Producer: Jhon Hill Electronic Music: Bebe & Louis Baron (LP)
- OCCULT EXPLOSION. United Artists - Feature Artists. Producer: Nat Freedland (LP)
