= Ramirez (band) =

- Origin: Zagreb, Croatia
- Genres: Rock, alternative rock
- Years active: 2000–present
- Members: Aljoša Šerić; Saša Jungić; Goran Leka; Tomislav Šušak; Ozren Ratković
- Website: www.myspace.com/myramirez

Ramirez is a rock band from Zagreb, Croatia. They are considered one of the most prominent Croatian bands of the so-called "new new wave" movement, which also includes bands such as Vatra.

The band was founded in 2000 and achieved notable success on several festivals even before being signed to a label. Their eponymous debut album, produced by Denis Mujadžić-Denyken, was released in October 2004. It received critical acclaim, sold well and went on to become one of the most successful Croatian albums that year. The first single off the album was "Iste cipele" (The same shoes), still one of the band's signature songs to date. Fueled by this success, the band followed it up with a series of concerts, performing with the hip pop band Elemental and opening for Hladno Pivo, among others.

In 2006, the band released their second album, Copy/Paste, also produced by Denyken and characterized by a much heavier sound.

Lead singer and frontman Aljoša Šerić started an acoustic-oriented side project, Pavel, and released an album of the same name in 2007.

Their third album, Divovi i kamikaze, came out in 2009. A single off it, "Sedam", was used in a campaign to help raise public awareness about HIV (in collaboration with HUHIV – the Croatian Association for HIV).

The band's last single from the album, "Fantastično, bezobrazno", was the subject of some controversy after its video was censored and banned from Croatian national television (HRT) due to scenes of violence and alcohol abuse.

The band finished recording their fourth studio effort in the fall of 2010, and the first single, "Ti i ja" (You and me) had been performing well on Croatian mainstream charts as of November 2010. The new album, named Svijet je lijep (The world is beautiful) was released on 21 March 2011. Ramirez also recently released their new single, "Da li me voli" (Does she love me).

== Members ==
- Aljoša Šerić – vocals, acoustic guitar
- Saša Jungić – electric guitar, vocals
- Goran Leka – drums
- Tomislav Šušak – bass, vocals
- Ozren Ratković – formerly bass

== Discography ==
=== Albums ===
- Ramirez, Menart, 2004
- Copy/Paste, Menart, 2006
- Divovi i kamikaze (Giants and kamikazes), Menart, 2009
- Svijet je lijep (The world is beautiful), Menart, 2011

=== Singles ===
- Iste cipele (The same shoes), 2004
- Sve je OK (Everything is OK), 2004
- Otjeraj me (Chase me away), 2005
- Barcelona, 2005
- Ništa posebno (Nothing special), 2006
- Loš (treća) (Bad (the third)), 2006
- Copy/Paste, 2006
- Učini nešto danas (Do something today), 2009
- Sedam (Seven), 2009
- Fantastično, bezobrazno (Fantastic, rude), 2009
- Ti i ja (You and me), 2010
- Da li me voli (Does she love me), 2011
