= 1997 Soul Train Music Awards =

Music awards ceremony in Los Angeles, US

Soul Train Music Awards
- Date: March 7, 1997
- Location: Shrine Auditorium, Los Angeles, California
- Country: United States
- Hosted by: Gladys Knight, Brandy and LL Cool J
- First award: 1987

Highlights
- Most awards: Maxwell (3)
- Website: soultrain.com

Television/radio coverage
- Network: WGN America

The 1997 Soul Train Music Awards was held at the Shrine Auditorium in Los Angeles, California on March 7, 1997. The show was hosted by Brandy, LL Cool J and Gladys Knight. It would be the final public appearance for the Notorious B.I.G., as he would be murdered two days after the ceremony.

== Special awards ==
=== Quincy Jones Award for Outstanding Career Achievements ===
- Curtis Mayfield

=== Sammy Davis Jr. Award for Entertainer of the Year ===
- Babyface

== Winners and nominees ==
Winners are in bold text.

=== R&B/Soul or Rap Album of the Year ===
- **2Pac – All Eyez On Me**
  - Fugees - The Score
  - R. Kelly - R.Kelly
  - Outkast – ATLiens

=== Best R&B/Soul Album – Male ===
- **Maxwell** – **Maxwell's Urban Hang Suite**
  - Babyface – The Day
  - R. Kelly – R. Kelly
  - Keith Sweat – Keith Sweat

=== Best R&B/Soul Album – Female ===
- **Toni Braxton – Secrets**
  - Aaliyah – One in a Million
  - Monifah – Moods...Moments
  - Meshell Ndegeocello – Peace Beyond Passion

=== Best R&B/Soul Album – Group, Band, or Duo ===
- **New Edition – Home Again**
  - 112 – 112
  - The Isley Brothers – Mission to Please
  - Mint Condition – Definition of a Band

=== Best R&B/Soul Single – Male ===
- **Maxwell – "Ascension (Don't Ever Wonder)"**
  - Montell Jordan (featuring Slick Rick) - "I Like
  - Joe – "All the Things (Your Man Won't Do)"
  - Keith Sweat – "Twisted"

=== Best R&B/Soul Single – Female ===
- **Toni Braxton – "You're Makin' Me High" / "Let It Flow"**
  - Mary J. Blige – "Not Gon' Cry"
  - Brandy – "Sittin' Up in My Room"
  - Monica – "Why I Love You So Much"

=== Best R&B/Soul Single – Group, Band, or Duo ===
- **Blackstreet (featuring Dr. Dre and Queen Pen) – "No Diggity"**
  - 112 – "Only You"
  - Az Yet – "Last Night"
  - Mint Condition – "What Kind of Man Would I Be?"

=== The Michael Jackson Award for Best R&B/Soul or Rap Music Video ===
- **Bone Thugs-n-Harmony – "Tha Crossroads"**
  - 2Pac – How Do U Want It ( featuring K-Ci and JoJo )
  - Busta Rhymes – "Woo Hah!! Got You All in Check"
  - LL Cool J – "Doin' It"

=== Best R&B/Soul or Rap New Artist ===
- **Maxwell**
  - 112
  - AZ Yet
  - Tony Rich

=== Best Jazz Album ===
- **Herbie Hancock – The New Standard**
  - Quincy Jones – Q's Jook Joint
  - Diana Krall – All for You: A Dedication to the Nat King Cole Trio
  - Art Porter – Lay Your Hands on Me

=== Best Gospel Album ===
- **Kirk Franklin – Whatcha Lookin' 4**
  - Rev. Clay Evans – I've Got a Testimony
  - Dottie Peoples – Count on God
  - The Williams Sisters – Live on the East Coast

== Performances ==
- En Vogue – "Don't Let Go (Love)"
- Blackstreet and Queen Pen – "No Diggity"
- Mint Condition – "What Kind of Man Would I Be?"
- Maxwell – "Sumthin' Sumthin'"
- The Isley Brothers – "Tears"
- Keith Sweat – "Twisted"
- Curtis Mayfield Tribute:
  - Gladys Knight – "Something He Can Feel" / "The Makings of You" / "People Get Ready"
- Fugees – "Killing Me Softly with His Song" / "Ready or Not"
- Mary J. Blige and Nas – "Love Is All We Need"

== Presenters ==
- Will Smith - Presented Sammy Davis Jr. Award For Entertainer of the Year
- Tisha Campbell, SWV, and Dru Hill - Presented Best R&B Soul/Rap New Artist
- Warren G, Salli Richardson, and Alfonzo Hunter - Presented Best Jazz Album
- Brian McKnight, The Notorious B.I.G, Puff Daddy, and 112 - Presented Best R&B Soul Single Female
- Michelle Thomas, Aaliyah, Outkast, and Ray J. - Presented Best R&B Soul Single Male
- Snoop Doggy Dogg, Immature, and Tamia - Presented Michael Jackson Award For Best R&B Soul/Rap Music Video
- Bone Thugs-n-Harmony, and Brownstone - Presented Best Gospel Album
- Quincy Jones - Presented Quincy Jones Award Outstanding For Career Achievements
- Monica, AZ Yet, and Kenny Lattimore - Presented R&B Soul Album Group, Band, or Duo
- Robert Townsend, Busta Rhymes, and 702 - Presented Best R&B Soul Album Male
- Da Brat, Deborah Cox, and Tony Rich - Presented Best R&B Soul Album Female
- Heavy D, Monifah, and Zhane - Presented Best R&B Soul/Rap Album of the Year
- New Edition, Shari Headley, and Montell Jordan - Presented Best R&B Soul Single Group, Band, or Duo
