= Love Jones (soundtrack) =

Love Jones: The Music

Soundtrack album by Various artists
- Released: March 11, 1997
- Recorded: 1994–96
- Genre: R&B
- Length: 1:07:15
- Label: Sony
- Producers: Dana Sano (exec.); Jon McHugh (exec.); Lori Silfen (exec.); Nick Wechsler (exec.); Theodore Witcher (exec.); Toby Emmerich (exec.); A Touch of Jazz; Bob Thiele; Bryce Wilson; Cassandra Wilson; Cassie Bonner; Darryl Pearson; Dionne Farris; Fugees; Jazz at Lincoln Center; Jermaine Dupri; Kenny Lattimore; Marcus Miller; Maxwell; Randy Jackson; Samuel J. Sapp; The Brand New Heavies; Van Hunt

Singles from Love Jones: The Music
- 1. "Sumthin' Sumthin': Mellosmoothe" Released: 1997

Love Jones: The Music is the soundtrack to the American romantic comedy-drama film Love Jones (1997) by Theodore Witcher. It was released on March 11, 1997, via Sony Music. The album features a blend of R&B, neo-soul, jazz, and spoken word. It includes contributions from artists such as Lauryn Hill and Wyclef Jean, Maxwell, Meshell Ndegeocello, Xscape, Dionne Farris and The Brand New Heavies, among others.

Love Jones: The Music was a commercial success, peaking at number 3 on the Billboard Top R&B/Hip-Hop Albums chart and reaching the top 20 of the Billboard 200. The songs "The Sweetest Thing" by Refugee Camp All-Stars featuring Lauryn Hill and "Sumthin' Sumthin' (Mellosmoothe)" by Maxwell were released as singles, and found success on the R&B charts. The soundtrack has been certified platinum by the Recording Industry Association of America.

== Critical reception ==
Professional ratings
Review scores
Source	Rating
AllMusic	4/5 stars

== Track listing ==
No.	Title	Writer(s)	Producer(s)	Length
1.	"Brother to the Night (A Blues for Nina) - Darius' Poem" (performed by Larenz Tate)	Reginald Gibson		3:18
2.	"Hopeless" (performed by Dionne Farris)	Van Hunt; Dionne Farris	Randy Jackson; Dionne Farris; Van Hunt	3:53
3.	"The Sweetest Thing" (performed by Refugee Camp All-Stars featuring Lauryn Hill)	Lauryn Hill	Lauryn Hill; Wyclef Jean	4:49
4.	"I Got a Love Jones for You" (performed by Refugee Camp All-Stars)	Melky Sedeck; Darryl Pearson; Pras Michel; Wyclef Jean; Randolph Murph; Clarence Johnson; Ralph Eskridge	Pras; Wyclef Jean; Darryl Pearson; Farel Jean (co.)	3:38
5.	"Sumthin' Sumthin': Mellosmoothe" (performed by Maxwell)	Gerald Rivera; Leon Ware	Musze	4:12
6.	"Never Enough" (performed by Groove Theory)	Amel Larrieux; Bryce Wilson	Bryce Wilson	4:P12
7.	"Inside My Love" (performed by Trina Broussard)	Minnie Riperton; Leon Ware; Richard Rudolph	Jermaine Dupri; Trina Broussard (co.)	4:13
8.	"In the Rain" (performed by Xscape)	Tony Hester	Samuel J. Sapp; Tim Shider (co.)	5:14
9.	"You Move Me" (performed by Cassandra Wilson)	Cassandra Wilson	Cassandra Wilson	4:17
10.	"Rush Over" (performed by Marcus Miller & Me'Shell Ndegéocello)	Marcus Miller; Me'Shell Ndegéocello	Marcus Miller; David I. Ward II (co.)	5:19
11.	"I Like It" (performed by The Brand New Heavies)	Simon Bartholomew; Siedah Garrett; Jan Kincaid; Andrew Levy	The Brand New Heavies	3:34
12.	"Girl" (performed by Cassie Bonner)	Cassie Bonner	Cassie Bonner	3:56
13.	"Can't Get Enough" (performed by Kenny Lattimore)	Carvin Haggins; Kenny Lattimore; Kenny Lerum	A Touch of Jazz; Kenny Lattimore	3:59
14.	"Jelly, Jelly" (performed by The Lincoln Center Jazz Orchestra)	Billy Eckstine; Earl Hines	Jazz at Lincoln Center	5:46
15.	"In a Sentimental Mood" (performed by Duke Ellington & John Coltrane)	Duke Ellington	Bob Thiele	4:14
16.	"Lyric: I Am Looking at Music - Nina's Poem" (performed by Nia Long)	Pinkie Gordon Lane		2:29
Total length:				1:07:15

Notes

- Tracks 6, 7, 8, 12 are not featured in the film.

== Personnel ==
- Stephen Marcussen — mastering
- Toby Emmerich — executive producer
- Dana Sano — executive producer
- Lori Silfen — executive producer
- Jon McHugh — executive producer
- Nick Wechsler — executive producer
- Theodore Witcher — executive producer
- Melodee Sutton — music coordinator
- Pilar McCurry — music supervisor
- Michael T. Mauldin — A&R
- Samuel J. Sapp — A&R
- Randy Jackson — A&R
- Glen Brunman — A&R
- Christine Wilson — design

== Charts ==
Chart (1997)	Peak position
US Billboard 200	16
US Top R&B/Hip-Hop Albums (Billboard)	3

== Certifications ==
Region	Certification	Certified units/sales
United States (RIAA)	Platinum	1,000,000^{^}
^{^} Shipments figures based on certification alone.
