= List of 13 Reasons Why episodes =

13 Reasons Why is an American teen drama television series developed for Netflix by Brian Yorkey, based on the 2007 novel Thirteen Reasons Why by Jay Asher. During the course of the series, 49 episodes of 13 Reasons Why were released over four seasons, between March 31, 2017, and June 5, 2020.

== Series overview ==
Season	Episodes	Originally released
1	13	March 31, 2017
2	13	May 18, 2018
3	13	August 23, 2019
4	10	June 5, 2020

== Episodes ==
=== Season 1 (2017) ===
No. overall	No. in season	Title	Directed by	Written by	Original release date
1	1	"Tape 1, Side A"	Tom McCarthy	Teleplay by : Brian Yorkey	March 31, 2017
Clay Jensen finds a box filled with audio cassette tapes anonymously left on his front doorstep. He plays the first in his father's boombox and realizes they have been recorded by his recently deceased classmate Hannah Baker before he accidentally drops and breaks the boombox when surprised by his mother. Clay steals his friend Tony's Walkman to continue listening. Clay listens to the first tape, in which Hannah begins to relate the experiences that led to her suicide. She starts by sharing the story of her first kiss, with Justin Foley, who goes on to inadvertently spread a salacious rumor that begins the sequence of events leading to her suicide. Clay is revealed, through numerous short flashbacks, to have been in love with Hannah and to have worked with her at the local movie theater. It is revealed in this episode that Hannah has put Tony in charge of the tapes. Tape subject: Justin Foley, for spreading a racy picture of Hannah along with a sexual rumor about their encounter.
2	2	"Tape 1, Side B"	Tom McCarthy	Teleplay by : Brian Yorkey	March 31, 2017
Hannah reminisces about her friendship with two other new students: Jessica, who moves frequently because her father is in the Air Force, and Alex, whom they met at a coffee shop. Jessica and Alex eventually begin a relationship and stop spending time with Hannah. When Alex breaks up with Jessica, she very publicly blames and slaps Hannah. In the present, Hannah's mother, Olivia, finds a note in her daughter's textbook that leads her to believe Hannah was being bullied. Clay asks Jessica about the tapes, which results in Bryce Walker's circle of peers meeting to discuss how Clay is listening to Hannah's recordings. Tape subject: Jessica Davis, for mistakenly blaming Hannah for her breakup with Alex.
3	3	"Tape 2, Side A"	Helen Shaver	Teleplay by : Diana Son	March 31, 2017
As Clay attempts to pursue a romantic relationship with Hannah, her relationships are threatened by a "best/worst" list made by Alex, who has put a target on Hannah. In the present, Olivia seeks out the school principal about her suspicion of bullying, but he shuts her down. Olivia later discovers insulting comments about other girls written on the school's bathroom walls, indicating evidence of a hostile school environment. In the midst of his investigation, Clay turns to Alex for answers, who not only feels regret for his actions on the tapes, but also warns Clay against trusting Tony, whom Clay later sees in a violent exchange with his brothers. As Justin tries to recuperate from his recent slump, Bryce strong-arms Clay and Alex into a drinking contest in an alleyway. Tape subject: Alex Standall, for listing Hannah's ass as the best in school to make Jessica Davis jealous and for destroying her friendship with Jessica.
4	4	"Tape 2, Side B"	Helen Shaver	Teleplay by : Thomas Higgins	March 31, 2017
Hannah hears someone outside her window, and confesses to her friend, Courtney, that she has a stalker. Courtney offers to help her catch the offender in the act. While waiting for the stalker to arrive, they play an alcohol-fueled game of truth or dare that leads to the two of them kissing on Hannah's bed. The stalker, school photographer Tyler Down, takes a photo of the girls and sends it around the school. This effectively ends Courtney and Hannah's friendship as Courtney distances herself from Hannah to avoid being revealed as one of the people in the photograph. In the present, Clay goes to Hannah's house and talks to Olivia, though is unable to admit how close he and Hannah were. He also confronts Tony about the incident with his brothers. Tony responds that "people have to make their own justice" and proves he has an extra set of tapes. Inspired by this, Clay takes a naked picture of Tyler and sends it around the school in revenge. Tape subject: Tyler Down, for stalking Hannah and spreading the photo of her and Courtney's kiss around the school.
5	5	"Tape 3, Side A"	Kyle Patrick Alvarez	Teleplay by : Julia Bicknell	March 31, 2017
Courtney, afraid of her classmates finding out about her sexuality, spreads a rumor that the girls in the leaked photos are Hannah and Laura, an openly lesbian classmate. Courtney also adds to the rumor about Hannah and Justin, worsening Hannah's poor reputation. In the present, Clay takes Courtney to visit Hannah's grave. She leaves, not ready to face her involvement in the loss of her classmate or be more open about her sexuality. Tony arrives with Clay's bike and gives him a tape with the song he and Hannah danced to at the Winter Formal. Later, Justin, Zach and Alex force Clay into the car with them by stealing his bike and scare him into silence about the tapes by driving over the speed limit. They are pulled over by the police but face no consequences as the officer is revealed to be Alex's father. Clay denies knowing Hannah to his mother, who has been asked to represent the school in the lawsuit the Bakers are bringing. Tape subject: Courtney Crimsen, for deflecting attention about both her sexuality and the photo Tyler took of her and Hannah by spreading further rumors about Hannah.
6	6	"Tape 3, Side B"	Kyle Patrick Alvarez	Teleplay by : Nic Sheff	March 31, 2017
Hannah decides to go on a Valentine's Day date with Marcus after completing a matchmaking survey. During the date, Marcus arrives with his friends and tries to grope Hannah, who angrily sends him away. Marcus insults Hannah and leaves; an apologetic Zach later returns to sit with Hannah. In the present, Alex gets into a fight with Monty and they both must appear before the student honor board. The board, headed by Marcus, decides to suspend Monty from school for three days and give Alex a warning. Clay helps his friendly classmate Sheri with an assignment, and they start kissing until Sheri reveals she is only there because she is on the tapes and wants Clay to like her despite her role in Hannah's death. Tape subject: Marcus Cole, for humiliating and attempting to sexually assault Hannah in public on their Dollar Valentine date.
7	7	"Tape 4, Side A"	Gregg Araki	Teleplay by : Elizabeth Benjamin	March 31, 2017
After Hannah refuses to go out with Zach, he gets revenge by removing compliments from Hannah's classroom box, affecting her self-confidence. She attempts to write a letter to Zach explaining why she needs the compliments, but when Zach reads it, he ignores it and throws it away. In the present, Clay hears Zach's tape and keys his car in an act of revenge. Clay is eventually caught, but things turn out to be different than they appeared; Zach was actually scared by the letter's content and kept it to himself. Clay experiences both auditory and visual hallucinations of Hannah during the day, including seeing her dead body on the floor of the basketball court during a game and hearing her tape playing over the school's intercom system. Clay returns the tapes to Tony, unable to continue listening, but continues to experience the hallucinations. Clay snaps in the hallways, publicly criticizing Liberty High's school culture. Tape subject: Zach Dempsey, for stealing the "positive notes" destined to Hannah in Communications class out of revenge for her rejecting him and his help.
8	8	"Tape 4, Side B"	Gregg Araki	Teleplay by : Kirk Moore	March 31, 2017
Hannah joins the Evergreen Poetry Club, a place where people write and perform their own poetry, and listen and critique others. She bonds with fellow student Ryan Shaver, and presents some extremely revealing and confessional poetry at the poetry club after Ryan encourages her. Ryan betrays her by publishing the poem without her knowledge or consent in his school magazine. Almost everyone in school finds the poem hilarious, but Clay is both touched and disturbed by it, not realizing Hannah is the author. In the present day, Tony confides to Clay about the night of Hannah's death, and Clay takes back the tapes. Clay later gives a copy of Hannah's poem to Olivia. Tape subject: Ryan Shaver, for stealing a poem Hannah wrote detailing her personal problems and publishing it in his magazine without her consent.
9	9	"Tape 5, Side A"	Carl Franklin	Teleplay by : Hayley Tyler	March 31, 2017
While hiding in Jessica's room during a party, Hannah witnesses Bryce Walker raping an unconscious and intoxicated Jessica. In the present, Marcus warns Clay the worst is yet to come and again attempts to scare him into silence about the tapes, this time by planting drugs in his backpack to get him suspended from school. Clay finally admits to his mother that he and Hannah were close. After getting suspicious legal advice from his mother, Clay goes to Justin's apartment to retrieve his bike and talk about getting justice for Jessica. Justin finally admits that what happened in the tapes is real, and claims it is better if Jessica does not know the truth. Tape subject: Justin Foley (and seemingly Hannah Baker herself), for allowing Bryce to rape his girlfriend Jessica.
10	10	"Tape 5, Side B"	Carl Franklin	Teleplay by : Nathan Louis Jackson	March 31, 2017
After the party, Hannah is offered a ride home by her classmate, cheerleader Sheri Holland. While driving Hannah home, Sheri accidentally knocks over a stop sign. While Hannah wants to call the police to report it, Sheri refuses to do so, because she is afraid she will get in trouble. While Hannah is on her way to find a phone to call the authorities, the downed stop sign causes a serious accident at that intersection, resulting in the death of Clay's friend Jeff Atkins, which was incorrectly considered a drunk driving incident. When Hannah tries to tell Clay about the stop sign, he pushes her away, thinking she is being unnecessarily dramatic. In the present, Justin expresses concern for Jessica, whose behavior is becoming more erratic. Clay finds out that Sheri is trying to make up for her mistake in her own way, and he tells Jeff's parents that Jeff was sober when he died. Tape subject: Sheri Holland, for abandoning Hannah after crashing her car into a stop sign, which ultimately caused the death of Jeff Atkins.
11	11	"Tape 6, Side A"	Jessica Yu	Teleplay by : Diana Son	March 31, 2017
With Tony's support, Clay finally listens to his tape and is overcome with guilt to the point of contemplating his own suicide because he feels he did not do enough to prevent Hannah's death. Tony manages to calm him down, and affirms that Hannah was the one who ultimately made the choice to take her life. Justin finds out that Jessica is at Bryce's home. He confronts her there and admits that Bryce raped her on the night of the party, causing her to slap him. Olivia finds a list with the names of all the people on the tapes, although she does not know what the list means. Tape subject: Ostensibly Clay Jensen, for complying with Hannah's request to leave her alone at Jessica's party. However, Hannah is explicit in stating Clay is not included in the list, but is there because he must be, as he is part of the story.
12	12	"Tape 6, Side B"	Jessica Yu	Teleplay by : Elizabeth Benjamin	March 31, 2017
After accidentally losing her parents' store's earnings, a depressed Hannah stumbles upon a party being thrown by Bryce. The night ends in tragedy when she ends up alone with him, and he rapes her in his hot tub. This leads Hannah to create a list of people (the one that her mother found in the previous episode) who she feels were responsible for leading her to her current circumstances, which becomes the inspiration for the creation of the tapes. In the present, everyone on Hannah's list is subpoenaed to testify in the lawsuit between the Bakers and the school. The subjects of the tapes disagree over what to do; Tyler eventually suggests they pin everything on Bryce, but Alex refuses and says they should tell the truth. Sheri turns herself in. Clay goes to Bryce's house, on the pretext of buying marijuana, to confront him about the events of the night he raped Hannah. Clay provokes Bryce to attack him and is badly beaten. However, Clay has been secretly recording their conversation and gets Bryce to admit that he raped Hannah. An unknown teenager with a gunshot wound to the head is treated by paramedics. Tape subject: Bryce Walker, for raping Hannah in his hot tub.
13	13	"Tape 7, Side A"	Kyle Patrick Alvarez	Teleplay by : Brian Yorkey	March 31, 2017
After recording the twelve tapes, Hannah decides to visit Mr. Porter to tell him about her rape as she secretly records the conversation, hoping he will help her. When he does not, Hannah heads to a post office and mails the tapes to Justin Foley before going home and taking her own life by slitting her wrists. In the present, Clay gives Tony the tape of his conversation with Bryce to copy before confronting Mr. Porter about meeting with Hannah on her last day, giving him the tapes before leaving. Tony copies the tapes onto a flash drive and gives it to the Bakers. As the depositions begin, Marcus and Courtney deny their involvement in Hannah's death as much as possible while Zach and Jessica admit their mistakes. Before his deposition, Tyler hides ammunition and guns in his room, then reveals the existence of the tapes and Clay's possession of them during his interview. Alex is revealed to have been the teenager with the gunshot wound; he is in critical condition at the hospital. Jessica finally tells her father about her rape. At school, Clay reaches out to Skye Miller, his former friend, to avoid repeating the same mistakes he made with Hannah. Tape subject: Mr. Porter, for not believing Hannah was suicidal and for not giving her proper help. Note: Netflix digitally altered the suicide scene in this episode on July 15, 2019.

=== Season 2 (2018) ===
No. overall	No. in season	Title	Directed by	Written by	Original release date
14	1	"The First Polaroid"	Gregg Araki	Brian Yorkey	May 18, 2018
Five months after the events of the first season, Hannah's trial moves to court. Tyler is the first to testify in the trial and does so truthfully. Skye and Clay are dating, but Clay starts to have hallucinations of Hannah. Mr. Porter confronts Bryce in the bathroom about raping Hannah. Jessica returns to school, as does Alex, who survived his suicide attempt but has lost much of his memory from before it, including the contents of Hannah's tapes. Tony is given the note Hannah left him the night she died and is later seen burning it. A Polaroid was left in Clay's locker, with a note saying "Hannah wasn't the only one". Testified: Tyler Down, during cross-examination by the school lawyer talks about taking photos of Hannah during a photoshoot and attempting to befriend her.
15	2	"Two Girls Kissing"	Gregg Araki	Thomas Higgins	May 18, 2018
Clay talks to Hannah's ghost and asks what she was doing in the living world but she does not have any idea why she is appearing. During her testimony, Courtney reveals that she is a lesbian and had feelings for Hannah. A group of protesters gathers at the court to demand justice for Hannah, but Jessica and Alex are both threatened to avoid revealing anything incriminating when they testify. Skye and Clay fight over her suspicion that Clay is still in love with Hannah, and Skye is hospitalized soon after leaving Clay's house. Meanwhile, Tyler befriends a classmate named Cyrus. Testified: Courtney Crimsen, who talks about her feelings towards Hannah and their kiss.
16	3	"The Drunk Slut"	Karen Moncrieff	Marissa Jo Cerar	May 18, 2018
Clay, riding home on his bicycle, is hit intentionally by a car, which leaves him slightly injured. He visits Skye in the hospital, but she breaks up with him. Clay and Alex try to encourage Jessica to reveal information about Bryce during her testimony, but she fails after seeing incriminating pictures of her stuck to the board in a classroom. Olivia asks her afterwards if she was the girl on the ninth tape, but Jessica does not answer. After discovering Jessica had been contacted by Justin, Clay finds him homeless in Oakland with Tony's help. With no other option, Clay lets Justin stay in his bedroom with him. Skye's parents move her to a psychiatric facility, and tell Clay not to contact her. Tyler meets the rest of Cyrus's friends while Bryce is asked to testify. Testified: Jessica Davis, who talks about the hot-or-not list and hers and Hannah's friendship.
17	4	"The Second Polaroid"	Karen Moncrieff	Hayley Tyler	May 18, 2018
Marcus lies about what happened with Hannah the night they went out on Valentine's Day during his testimony (in order to protect his reputation) and briefly mentions Bryce, angering him. Cyrus and Tyler hear of Marcus's lies and prank him, going to a nearby field afterwards to shoot guns. Clay finds out that Justin has been taking heroin and he and Sheri help him onto the path to sobriety. Jessica shows the threatening note she was left before her testimony to Mr Porter. Alex continues to be frustrated about not being able to remember anything and asks Clay for the tapes, who sends them to him. Jessica and Alex skip school and share a kiss. Clay also finds a second Polaroid photograph in his locker, which shows Bryce raping an unconscious girl, alongside a note warning "He won't stop". Testified: Marcus Cole, who lies about what happened with Hannah the night they went out.
18	5	"The Chalk Machine"	Eliza Hittman	Nic Sheff	May 18, 2018
Tyler is confronted by Mr. Porter, who suspects he was behind the pictures of Jessica found in the classroom before her testimony, but he denies involvement. Ryan testifies and talks about Hannah's poems, saying they were written about Justin and that she and Justin maintained contact even after falling out. Afterwards, Olivia invites Ryan to help her decipher Hannah's poems for additional clues, but Ryan soon leaves after Olivia mentions missing pages in Hannah's journal, which Ryan had torn out. Clay realizes the Polaroid photos were taken at school and attempts to find out where. Chloë meets with Bryce's parents and his mother notices bruises on her. Jessica attends her first group therapy session, where she befriends Nina. Mr. Porter finds a brick thrown through his car window, with a threatening note attached; he later confronts Justin's mother and is arrested after a violent incident with her boyfriend. Testified: Ryan Shaver, who talks about the poems he wrote with Hannah and who she wrote them about.
19	6	"The Smile at the End of the Dock"	Eliza Hittman	Julia Bicknell	May 18, 2018
Zach testifies and reveals that he and Hannah had a romantic relationship the summer before she died, but they kept it secret. After the testimony, Clay reacts angrily and confronts Zach, ignoring his apologies, while Bryce teases Zach about his relationship, prompting a small fight between them. Justin returns to school and talks to Jessica, but she asks him to leave. He then faints after seeing Bryce, and on his return to Clay's house, has to hide as someone breaks in, at which point Clay's parents find out he has been staying there, but allow it to continue. Testified: Zach Dempsey, who talks about his relationship with Hannah the summer before she died.
20	7	"The Third Polaroid"	Michael Morris	Brian Yorkey	May 18, 2018
During Clay's testimony, he is forced to reveal he and Hannah did drugs at a small party one night and spent the night together, and Clay ignored a comment Hannah made the next morning about wanting to die. Alex's birthday party at the arcade is derailed after a number of arguments break out. When Clay leaves the birthday party, he finds a Polaroid photograph left on his car, with a note reading "The Clubhouse". After reading comments posted online about his testimony, Clay anonymously uploads Hannah's tapes to the Internet. Meanwhile, Bryce is seen having sex with Chloë without getting proper consent. The baseball team pays tribute to Jeff Atkins. Testified: Clay Jensen, who talks about his friendship with Hannah.
21	8	"The Little Girl"	Michael Morris	Felischa Marye	May 18, 2018
After the release of the tapes, Bryce returns to school to find his locker vandalized and his "confession tape" Clay recorded being shared among students. After Marcus is blackmailed, he calls Bryce a rapist during a speech at a ceremony, in front of a large group of parents and students, in order to protect his own reputation. Clay finally contacts Skye again and meets with her at the psychiatric facility, but she tells him she is moving to a different state. Justin overdoses on heroin, but Alex saves his life – he then returns to his mother's home. The release of the tapes gets Clay in trouble with his parents. Testified: Andy and Olivia Baker, who talk about Hannah's life and the bullying at Liberty High.
22	9	"The Missing Page"	Kat Candler	Rohit Kumar	May 18, 2018
When testifying, Mr. Porter reveals that since Hannah's death he has come to believe that Hannah was raped by Bryce. He then emotionally apologizes to Hannah's mother for the part he played in her suicide. Justin steals money from his mother's boyfriend, and when confronted by his mother, leaves her some suggesting she leave too in order to escape the relationship. Bryce confronts and threatens Clay under the assumption that it was Clay who blackmailed Marcus into publicly accusing Bryce of rape. Later, Clay is violently beaten at school by four masked students. He is then approached by Cyrus who invites him to join him and Tyler in vandalizing the school that evening, but when he does, he sees a group of students entering a storage shed next to the baseball field, which he correctly guesses is the location of The Clubhouse. He texts Justin and they reconvene. Meanwhile, Olivia contacts a girl, Sarah, and her mother, and asks them not to testify. Testified: Pam Bradley, who talks about the atmosphere at Liberty High, and Kevin Porter, who talks about the day Hannah asked help from him.
23	10	"Smile, Bitches!"	Kat Candler	Kirk Moore	May 18, 2018
Tony is asked to testify, but chooses not to reveal that Hannah left him her tapes because he owed her a favor after she helped him evade arrest. During Sarah's testimony, she reveals Hannah was part of a trio of girls who bullied her at another high school. After an argument between Tyler and Mackenzie, his friendship with Cyrus breaks down. Offering marijuana, Sheri tempts some male students into taking her to The Clubhouse, where Bryce takes a picture of her and two other boys on a Polaroid camera, placing the photograph in a box filled with many others. She learns the code to unlock the door and shares it with Clay and Justin. During a baseball game, Zach confronts Bryce, tells him he knows Hannah was not lying, and quits the game. He goes to The Clubhouse to find Clay and Justin there, and hands Clay the box of Polaroid photographs taken in the Clubhouse, confessing that it was him who had given Clay the first three photographs. Clay reviews the photographs at home with Justin and Sheri, and they find a pair of photographs which show Bryce raping Chloë. Clay also finds a picture of Nina and Hannah. Testified: Sarah, who talks about Hannah bullying her, and Tony Padilla, who talks about his friendship with Hannah.
24	11	"Bryce and Chlöe"	Jessica Yu	Marissa Jo Cerar & Thomas Higgins	May 18, 2018
While testifying, Bryce lies and claims that he and Hannah had a casual sexual relationship, and that she falsely accused him of rape after he brought an end to it. When Bryce returns to school, Justin attacks him and a fight breaks out, which evolves into a mass brawl. Jessica shows Chloë the two pictures of Bryce and her in The Clubhouse, and Chloë confesses that she posted the pictures of Jessica in the classroom before she testified. Olivia, her legal team, and Jessica ask Chloë to testify, and she agrees, but on the stand, she testifies that she remembers Bryce having sex with her and remembers consenting. The box of Polaroid photographs taken from The Clubhouse is stolen from Clay's car, and Alex is sent a package containing a gun and a threatening letter. Bryce's mother later asks him whether he was telling the truth in his testimony, and, after being pressed, he coldly confesses to raping Hannah. Flashbacks reveal that Bryce wanted a relationship with Hannah and was rejected himself. Clay becomes mentally tormented by hallucinations of Hannah, to the point where he contemplates both murdering Bryce and killing himself, but Justin manages to calm him down. Testified: Bryce Walker, who lies about raping Hannah, and Chloë Rice, who talks about the clubhouse but also lies about being raped by Bryce.
25	12	"The Box of Polaroids"	Jessica Yu	Hayley Tyler & Brian Yorkey	May 18, 2018
Justin receives a death threat before going to testify, but he tells of Bryce raping Jessica during his testimony nonetheless. After Alex realizes that Monty is responsible for intimidating people during the trial, Alex, Clay, Justin, Tony, Zach, and Scott confront Monty and he admits to stealing the box of Polaroid photos. However, after Monty takes Alex to a deserted location to retrieve them, he reveals he was lying and escapes. As a result, Jessica is encouraged by her friends to report her case of sexual assault to the police. After the Baker trial concludes and the jury finds the school district not responsible for Hannah's death, both Bryce and Justin are arrested outside the courtroom for their involvement in Jessica's rape. Mr. Porter is fired after a performance review, and Tyler is placed on a diversion program after one of his social media posts reveals it was him who vandalized the school. Testified: Justin Foley, who talks about his relationship with Hannah and confesses about Bryce raping Jessica.
26	13	"Bye"	Kyle Patrick Alvarez	Brian Yorkey	May 18, 2018
One month later, after Bryce's sexual assault trial for raping Jessica, Bryce is convicted but sentenced to only three months' probation. Justin is sentenced to six months' probation and can only be released to one of his parents, neither of whom can be found, which leads Clay's family to adopt him. Tyler returns to school but is beaten and sexually assaulted with a broom by an enraged Monty and two of his friends. The following night, at a school dance, Jessica and Alex kiss. Shortly after, Jessica follows Justin to the bathroom and they have an intimate moment. Later Chloë tells Jessica she is pregnant. "The Night We Met" plays and everyone dances with Clay. A heartbroken and traumatized Tyler arrives at the dance planning to carry out a mass school shooting, but Clay learns of his plan, thanks to a text that Mackenzie received from Tyler. He then goes outside to confront him, encouraging him not to do it as he peacefully disarms Tyler and Tony arrives to drive Tyler away in his car. As the car departs, sirens of the approaching police cars can be heard, and Clay is left holding Tyler's rifle in front of the school.

=== Season 3 (2019) ===
No. overall	No. in season	Title	Directed by	Written by	Original release date
27	1	"Yeah. I'm the New Girl"	Michael Morris	Brian Yorkey	August 23, 2019
Flashbacks: On the night of the Spring Fling, Clay and Tony help Tyler dispose of the weapons while Justin, Zach, and Cyrus assist with the police. The next day, Clay organizes a schedule for the group to support Tyler's recovery, except for Zach who believes Tyler is dangerous. During school, Clay shows a new student, Ani Achola, around and introduces her to his friends. Ani suggests that Jessica run for class president, leading to a friendship. Bryce moves in with his mother after his father leaves town and sells their house. Present: Eight months after the dance, Clay is brought from school to the police station and questioned by Deputy Standall about Bryce's disappearance. Principal Bolan reprimands Jessica over a riot that occurred at the Homecoming game. Clay tells the others Bryce is missing, putting some of them on edge. Suspect: Clay Jensen because of his bicycle lock found in Bryce's room.
28	2	"If You're Breathing, You're a Liar"	Michael Morris	Allen MacDonald	August 23, 2019
Flashbacks: Zach is appointed football team captain, despite Monty's displeasure, and promises to change the team's culture. Jessica, at an assembly, promises to stop the rape culture if she is elected student body president. When Chloë walks out, Zach follows, and she tells him about her pregnancy. He agrees to help her get an abortion. Despite pressure from anti-abortion activists not to do it, she does, and decides to transfer to another school for senior year, also breaking up with Bryce. Meanwhile, Bryce is bullied at his new school for being a rapist. Present: After Clay notices a rabbit's foot on Zach's bag, which he knows belonged to Chloë, he and Ani confront Zach about Bryce injuring him. Jessica tells them about Chloë's pregnancy, but claims Bryce never knew, which Chloë backs up. Monty threatens Tyler after having been interrogated by the police about Bryce, and is later threatened by Alex. Ani discovers Bryce wrote a letter to Jessica. After taking pictures of himself shirtless, Tyler walks by the river and climbs an overpass. Later, near the overpass, the police pull a corpse from the river, revealed to be Bryce. Suspect: Zach Dempsey because of the gift Chloë gave him.
29	3	"The Good Person Is Indistinguishable from the Bad"	Jessica Yu	Hayley Tyler	August 23, 2019
Flashbacks: Jessica is elected student body president and begins working at the Crestmont. She later confronts Bryce at his house, where he tries to admit he was wrong but is ignored. Bryce tries to apologize to her at work but is rejected again. Later, Bryce meets Justin, revealing his attempts to apologize, as well as his knowledge of Tyler's attempt to commit a school shooting. Meanwhile, Jessica tells Ani that sex with Alex is not great, and Ani encourages her to "reconnect" with her body. Jessica does, and afterward, breaks up with Alex and begins a casual relationship with Justin. Present: Clay notices a scar on Justin's back. Later, to Clay's surprise, Justin mourns Bryce. Clay and Ani suspect Jessica, and investigate her, but discover that she and Justin have been secretly hooking up. Tyler admits to Clay and Tony that he still has a gun, and they plan to get rid of it. Later, Tyler is shown looking through pictures on his computer of Bryce's corpse, looking like it was shot in the head, with the gun next to him. Suspect: Jessica Davis because of the letter Bryce wrote for her; Justin Foley because of the scar on his back.
30	4	"Angry, Young and Man"	Jessica Yu	Thomas Higgins	August 23, 2019
Flashbacks: While the group monitors Tyler, he creeps Jessica out. Jessica forms a group called "Hands Off" for sexual assault survivors, which Tyler joins. Clay gives Ani his bike and lock. Clay, Ani, and Tyler see a movie. Tyler demands Monty apologize, but Monty refuses, claiming Bryce had him assault Tyler. Tyler threatens Bryce with his gun. Present: Clay, while watching Tyler due to the gun, finds a bag in Tyler's backpack. Tyler's parents thank Clay for being a friend, and Tyler confesses to finding Bryce's body and reporting it anonymously. He kept the gun to commit suicide but changed his mind. The bag contains a gift for Clay. The group learns Bryce was beaten, not shot. Justin disposes of the gun and later uses it to threaten Seth, his mother's ex-boyfriend. The police discover Bryce's car with steroids at the river, which upsets Alex. Clay and Tony admit to throwing Tyler's guns into the river. Suspect: Tyler Down because he still has a gun.
31	5	"Nobody's Clean"	Bronwen Hughes	Trevor Marti Smith	August 23, 2019
Flashbacks: Alex works out after his breakup with Jessica. Luke, a football player, gives him steroids. He later buys different steroids from Bryce, who introduces him to a prostitute to get him over Jessica. Later, Bryce brings Alex to help destroy his father's house. They vandalize the wrong house, and Bryce threatens a child who catches them. Alex ends their friendship. Bryce and Monty attend a party, where Monty hooks up with a boy from Bryce's school, Winston. When Winston asks Monty to hang out, Monty assaults him. Bryce pays him not to press charges. Present: The police search the school for steroids and find some in Luke's possession. Alex throws some away, which Justin retrieves. Monty hides an ID of another boy named Winston in his car, which Clay and Ani find. They confront Alex, the prostitute, Monty, and after finding the real Winston's Facebook page, Winston, who admits the other boy took the SATs for him and Bryce and Monty blackmailed him not to mention the assault. Justin disposes of Tyler's gun. Mrs. Walker tells her father Bryce is dead. Ani finds Tony's Mustang in Bryce's garage. Suspect: Alex Standall because of the steroids in Bryce's car.
32	6	"You Can Tell the Heart of a Man by How He Grieves"	Bronwen Hughes	Mfoniso Udofia	August 23, 2019
Flashbacks: Bryce's father divorces his mother and begins seeing another woman. After Bryce trashes his father's house, his father demands he pay for the damages. Bryce refuses and reveals he has an illegitimate daughter, though his mother does not use this against him in the divorce. It is revealed that shortly after Bryce's trial, ICE was called on Tony's family. His parents and brothers were deported to Mexico, and Tony had to send his sister to their aunt and uncle in Arizona. Bryce tried to make amends for his past ways by buying Tony's Mustang for double its worth, giving Tony money for a lawyer to fight the deportation, but it did not work. Present: Tony is interrogated about Bryce but tells the police nothing. At Bryce's funeral, his father arrives but seemingly does not mourn, disgusting his mother. The funeral is interrupted by Jessica's sexual assault survivor group, who protest the mourning of a rapist. Tony and Caleb tell Clay about the car when he asks. The police find footage of Clay pointing a gun at Bryce at his father's old house. Suspects: Tony Padilla because of his Mustang being in Bryce's garage; Barry Walker because of the daughter he hides.
33	7	"There Are a Number of Problems with Clay Jensen"	Kevin Dowling	Julia Bicknell	August 23, 2019
Flashbacks: Clay and Ani bond over a love of comic books. Later, they measure each other to make costumes for a cosplay convention. Ani takes off her clothes for this, allowing Clay to see her underwear. Clay drops Ani off at Bryce's house, and they kiss. Meanwhile, Ani and Bryce are revealed to have had a sexual relationship, in which he treated her with respect. Present: The police question Clay and Justin about the footage. Sheriff Diaz presents underwear with Ani's blood and Bryce's semen to Clay, who denies knowledge of its origin. Clay's parents discuss his involvement in Bryce's death. Alex confronts Jessica about her relationship with Justin, leading to public awareness. Jessica's group ignores her at Bryce's funeral protest. Clay and Ani argue over her connection to Bryce. Clay experiences hallucinations of Bryce taunting him and later finds Ani in his room, sensing her fear. Suspects: Clay Jensen because of the footage of Clay pointing a gun at Bryce; Ani Achola because of her underwear being found in Bryce's room.
34	8	"In High School, Even on a Good Day, It's Hard to Tell Who's on Your Side"	Kevin Dowling	Felischa Marye	August 23, 2019
Flashbacks: Mrs. Walker hires Mr. Porter as Bryce's counsellor. While counselling Bryce, he gives Bryce a journal to record private thoughts and has him write a letter from his mother's point of view about him. The letter reveals Bryce's belief that his mother hates him. When Mrs. Walker sees the letter, she reveals she does not, and she blames herself for her mistakes when Bryce was younger. Bryce also tells Mr. Porter about his relationship with 'a girl', and that he still has thoughts of rape on his mind. Present: Mrs. Walker tells Clay she will not stop the investigation. Clay discovers a note expressing her hatred for Bryce. The police call Mr. Porter, who questions several friends of Clay, including Tyler. Ani reveals Mr. Porter was counselling Bryce privately. Mr. Porter and Clay meet outside of school, and he believes Clay is innocent. He clarifies the note's context. Mr. Porter hints that something might have happened to Tyler. Clay confronts Tyler, who discloses his sexual assault by Monty. Clay finds oxycodone in Justin's belongings, prescribed to Bryce. Suspects: Kevin Porter because he has the same notebook that Bryce has; Nora Walker because of the note saying she hates Bryce.
35	9	"Always Waiting for the Next Bad News"	Aurora Guerrero	M.K. Malone	August 23, 2019
Flashbacks: Zach gets Justin to join the football team. While Justin works at Monet's, Seth demands the money Justin stole. Justin agrees to sell drugs work off the debt. When Justin keeps some drugs for personal use, Seth threatens him. Justin is arrested. Bryce bails him out, pays off Seth and gives Justin oxycodone to feed the addiction and prevent him from overdosing. Justin admits to Zach that he is still using, but Zach ensures he passes the drug tests. Present: Justin tells Clay he took the oxycodone from Bryce's room during the funeral. Justin and Jessica become an official couple, angering Alex. Ani tells Clay Justin did not take the drugs from Bryce's room. Monty threatens Justin. Justin breaks up with Jessica. Clay and Ani confront Justin, and he shows them Seth's text on the night Bryce died. They investigate Seth, finding Bryce's watch. Seth reveals Justin traded the watch for drugs. Justin confesses this is true, and he stole the watch, not the pills. He also admits to getting high on Homecoming night. Clay receives a distressing call from Mrs. Baker. Suspects: Justin Foley because he has Bryce's oxycodone bottle; Seth Massey because he has Bryce's watch.
36	10	"The World Closing In"	Aurora Guerrero	Story by : Rohit Kumar and Allen MacDonald & Thomas Higgins & Hayley Tyler; Teleplay by : Allen MacDonald & Thomas Higgins & Hayley Tyler & Brian Yorkey	August 23, 2019
Flashbacks: Olivia returns to Evergreen for Homecoming weekend. She tells Jessica and Tony that Bryce's father was responsible for Tony's family being deported. Tony confronts Bryce. Bryce tries to return the Mustang, and Tony makes him listen to the tapes. Bryce attempts to apologize to Olivia, but she rejects him. Olivia calls Clay and expresses her wish for Bryce's death. Meanwhile, Clay considers asking Ani to Homecoming, but after a confrontation with Bryce, becomes suspicious of Ani's true nature. While drunk, Bryce tells Ani he misses her and tries to grab her. Present: Olivia is questioned about Bryce's murder. Clay tells Jessica Justin is still an addict. Jessica shows up at Monet's during his shift to get back together with him, promising to help. Clay meets Olivia, where she tells him she is worried about how a voicemail she left him makes them look guilty. Olivia and Mrs. Walker meet up and talk about outliving their children. At home, Justin forgives Clay for telling Jessica. The police arrive with a search warrant. Suspects: Olivia Baker because of the voicemail she left Clay; Tony Padilla because Bryce's father had his family deported.
37	11	"There Are a Few Things I Haven't Told You"	Kevin Dowling	Helen Shang	August 23, 2019
Flashbacks: Bryce confronts Tyler about the gun, and Tyler reveals what Monty did. Principal Bolan tells Jessica that he is considering allowing Bryce to return to Liberty High next semester. On Homecoming night, Bryce asks Jessica to meet him at the docks after the game, and confronts Monty about Tyler's rape in front of Charlie, telling him to leave Tyler alone or be arrested for his actions during the trial. During halftime, Jessica and her group stage a protest, stripping and painting themselves red. When a Hillcrest player touches Jessica inappropriately, Justin leads the team to attack the Hillcrest team. Other students, including Clay and Alex, join the fight. Present: Clay admits to his parents that he texted threats to Bryce after Homecoming. Tyler offers to take pressure off him by telling him about Monty, but Clay tells him to speak when he's ready. Tyler tells Jessica, who confronts Monty. Principal Bolan tells Jessica to publicly apologize for Homecoming or she will lose her position as student body president. Clay asks Tony to help him disappear. Suspect: Clay Jensen because of the voicemail and texts on his phone.
38	12	"And Then the Hurricane Hit"	Kevin Dowling	Teleplay by : Allen MacDonald & M.K. Malone & Helen Shang; Story by : Thomas Higgins & Hayley Tyler & Trevor Marti Smith	August 23, 2019
Flashbacks: Chloë tells Bryce about her abortion, and that Zach supported her through it. Clay watches Ani and Bryce kiss. Later, Bryce attacks Zach over Chloë, dislocating his knee and ending his football career. Ani spills red paint on herself and hurries home to remove it. Zach finds Bryce at the pier and attacks him. He throws his phone in the river and leaves Bryce to die while he reconciles with Chloë. Present: Tyler convinces Clay to come to an assembly where Jessica apologizes for the protests. Tyler and Justin publicly reveal that they are sexual assault survivors. In private, Justin tells Jessica about his childhood experience. Clay is arrested. Tyler reports his sexual assault to the police. Monty is arrested. Ani tells Jessica that she slept with Bryce. Zach surrenders to the police, believing he killed Bryce. Deputy Standall reveals that Bryce drowned. Zach is released but charged for assault and battery. Suspect: Ani Achola because of the red paint on her clothes.
39	13	"Let the Dead Bury the Dead"	John T. Kretchmer	Brian Yorkey	August 23, 2019
Flashbacks: Shortly following the Homecoming game, everyone's alibis are revealed: Tony was laundering money through the Mexican cartel for his family, Justin was dealing and using drugs at the docks, and Monty was sleeping with Winston. Bryce, at the pier, is met by Alex and Jessica, and he hands Jessica a cassette tape. Alex helps him up. When Bryce threatens Zach, Alex pushes Bryce into the river, where he drowns. Jessica ends her relationship with Alex, and they go home. Present: Ani shares details of Bryce's murder with Deputy Standall, claiming Monty's involvement due to his lack of a strong alibi. Deputy Standall mentions Monty died in jail, and Ani encourages him to pin the murder on him. Deputy Standall realizes Alex killed Bryce but keeps it to himself, destroying the evidence. Ani starts dating Clay. The group covers up Alex's involvement in the murder. They listen to Bryce's tape. Tyler displays a photography project at Monet's for those who supported him. Winston confronts Ani for lying about Monty. A fisherman discovers the bag of guns stashed in the river during Spring Fling. Suspect: Monty de la Cruz because of the fight he had with Bryce in the changing rooms.

=== Season 4 (2020) ===
No. overall	No. in season	Title	Directed by	Written by	Original release date
40	1	"Winter Break"	Russell Mulcahy	Brian Yorkey	June 5, 2020
Clay has been having nightmares and hallucinations involving Monty ever since Monty was framed for Bryce's murder. The police questions Tyler after finding his bag of guns and tracing it back to him. Tyler tells Clay he lied to the police about the bag being stolen from him. Ani is planning to move to Oakland with her mother, unbeknownst to Clay. The group throws Justin a welcome-home party when he returns home from drug rehabilitation. Tyler starts behaving oddly after being questioned, worrying the rest of the group. After the party, Jessica tries to have sex with Justin, but he breaks up with her in order to focus on his sobriety. Ani's mother allows her to move in with Jessica so she can finish her senior year at Liberty High. Jessica burns the tape Bryce made for her. Winston transfers to Liberty, determined to investigate Bryce's death. Clay starts a fight at school with some of the jocks when they pressure Monty's sister Estela into wearing his jersey. While hanging out on a rooftop, Alex kisses Zach.
41	2	"College Tour"	Russell Mulcahy	Allen MacDonald	June 5, 2020
Clay struggles to fill out college applications due to anxiety over Monty. At school, the students find graffiti stating Monty was framed; Ani believes Winston is responsible, while Clay thinks it is one of them. In the school's dark room, Tyler confesses to Winston that Monty raped him. Clay and Justin go on a college tour together, with Clay's father as their guide. Zach skips the tour to attend a college party, and Clay follows him; at the party, a vision of Bryce encourages Clay to rape an unconscious girl, but Clay is spotted standing in her bedroom by her boyfriend. After missing a meeting with the dean, Clay and Justin talk about their plans for college. Alex begins hanging out with Winston and realizes he has feelings for him, eventually going to Tony to find answers about his sexuality. Ani talks to Estela, who says she is not trying to defend Monty but wonders why he would kill Bryce. When Clay comes home from a therapy session, he has a panic attack when the sheriff is talking to his parents about the school's security measures. In his anxiety, Clay writes on his application that he covered up Bryce's murder.
42	3	"Valentine's Day"	Michael Sucsy	Hayley Tyler	June 5, 2020
Clay's anxiety worsens when he sees how the school has tightened security. Throughout the day, Clay keeps receiving calls from Monty's number; when answered, a distorted voice torments him. The calls distract Clay from Ani's hints that she wants to go to the forthcoming "Love Is Love" dance with him. Alex rejects Jessica's offer to go to the dance with him, and the two talk about how Bryce's murder affected them. Alex asks Winston to the dance and the two kiss while Jessica asks out Charlie. A concerned Tony learns Tyler has been missing shifts at work and discovers him meeting Deputy Standall. Justin attends a support group at the encouragement of his coach. The caller tormenting Clay tells him that he will get Monty's phone if he shows up at the dance. At the dance, Clay dances with Ani before being called to go to the locker room. Once there, Clay is chased onto the field, hallucinates Monty bleeding out, and sees Bryce calling him a monster. When Clay recovers his senses, he realizes he was subjected to a cruel prank by the football team, led by Diego. Diego returns to the dance where he hooks up with Jessica, but the dance is stopped when Clay enters the gym with a knife.
43	4	"Senior Camping Trip"	Michael Sucsy	Thomas Higgins	June 5, 2020
The pranks cause Clay and Diego to be suspended for two weeks. However, they are allowed to attend a senior camping trip. Clay's friends receive an email from Clay's account threatening to expose them unless they confess on the trip; Clay denies sending it, and they conclude his account was hacked. Alex realizes Winston could provide an alibi for Monty. The students go on a treasure hunt in pairs, aided by clue sheets. Clay is paired with Justin, from whom he gets separated; Clay is then abducted by the football team, who place him in a hole, where he talks with a vision of Monty. Tyler and Alex find out Winston was using them to discover the truth about Monty. Alex joins Zach on a boat on the lake but falls overboard, but Zach saves him. As Jessica is tormented by nightmarish visions of Bryce, Diego confesses to being behind the prank but thinks something else is going on when Beecher goes missing; his suspicions are confirmed when Clay disappears from the hole and Beecher is found bound and gagged. The students are tormented by someone, while Clay makes his way back to camp with all the treasure bags.
44	5	"House Party"	Brenda Strong	M. K. Malone & Franky D. Gonzalez	June 5, 2020
Clay and Justin are grounded by their parents when one of them fails a drug test. Justin meets his coach and talks about his fears about breaking his sobriety; at home he expresses concern over Clay's behavior and anxiety. Jessica has been seeing Diego, and her father invites him for diner. The group meet at Monet's to talk about how their parents always seem to know their plans. The students plan on having a party behind their parents' backs. Winston tells Jessica and Estela that the football team is holding a memorial for Monty. That night, a student sneaks into Liberty and destroys the security cameras. At the party, Charlie and Alex get closer. Justin catches Clay smoking marijuana, and they get into an argument regarding their parents before Justin leaves. During Monty’s memorial, Jessica flees after seeing a vision of him. Clay hangs out with Zach, and gets involved with a girl named Valerie, to whom he loses his virginity. Zach meets Chloë and discovers she has a new boyfriend. Winston and Diego are revealed to be working together to uncover the truth about Monty's death. Tony and Justin catch Tyler handing a package to an arms dealer.
45	6	"Thursday"	Brenda Strong	Evangeline Ordaz	June 5, 2020
Principal Bolan announces Code Red, a non-drill school shooter lockdown. Alex, Tony, and Charlie wonder where Tyler is and find pictures of guns in his backpack. Estela hides in the girls' bathroom, where she finds Tyler hiding in one of the stalls. The football team, along with Justin, hide in the locker room, Clay hides in an empty classroom, Jessica hides in a storage unit, and Zach and Winston hide near the dark room. Clay is tormented by visions of Bryce and Monty. Zach and Winston do drugs, and Justin leaves to look for Jessica after an argument with Diego. Tony decides to tell Dean Foundry about the pictures, Estella and Tyler talk about Monty, and Zach reveals to Winston he beat up Bryce. After hearing gunshots, and fearing he will die not helping, Clay leaves the room, only to be told by Principal Bolan that the lockdown was merely a drill. While frantically arguing that the drill was unnecessary, Clay steals a police officer's gun, is knocked out and taken to a mental hospital.
46	7	"College Interview"	Sunu Gonera	Allen MacDonald & Hayley Tyler & Evangeline Ordaz	June 5, 2020
In a college interview, Tyler tells the interviewee that he is afraid of guns, yet finds them beautiful. Winston convinces Estella that Jessica is lying about Bryce's death, and Jessica is worried that the school thinks that she was the one to suggest the securities cameras, metal detectors, and the drill to Principal Bolan. Tyler confronts Tony about turning his pictures in to Dean Foundry, and Diego tells Zach that Winston told him his secret about Bryce. Clay escapes from the mental hospital to meet with Ani, who admits to rewriting his essay for the college admission to land him the interview at Brown University. Tony discovers the police are investigating Tyler's pictures, and Ani tells Jessica she is moving out to stay at Tony's. The next day, Justin is informed that his mother has died. Jessica, Alex, Ani, Justin, and Clay have their college interviews, and Mrs. Walker tells Ani she wants to pay for her college tuition. At night, Diego beats up Zach, and Tony and Clay find Tyler buying a gun. They attempt to stop him, but the police arrive.
47	8	"Acceptance/Rejection"	Sunu Gonera	Sahar Jahani & Thomas Higgins	June 5, 2020
Sheriff Diaz reveals to Clay and Tony that Tyler had been helping the police as an informant in order to catch illegal gun dealers. Jessica is rejected by three schools, including Columbia, while Alex and Justin receive acceptance letters from Berkeley and Occidental College, respectively. Clay has not heard back from Brown yet. At school, Jessica reveals she initially had been helping Principal Bolan, further convincing Estella she is lying about what happened to Monty. Tony is offered a full-ride scholarship to University of Nevada, which he initially rejects. After seeing Jessica kiss Diego, Justin breaks up with her. Clay discovers that his parents have been going to meetings at his school, where all the parents are instructed to track their children via smartphones. The next day, Diego accuses Justin of killing Bryce, causing a fight between them, ending in Diego being arrested by a racist police officer who believes he started the fight. This causes the entire school to participate in a walkout against SROs, resulting in a brawl between students and police officers, and in Clay destroying Principal Bolan's car. Dr. Ellman believes Clay has been experiencing dissociation, and Clay tells him he is ready to confess all his secrets.
48	9	"Prom"	Tommy Lohmann	Brian Yorkey	June 5, 2020
Dean Foundry threatens to cancel prom and begins an investigation to find who was responsible for inciting the walkout. The group decides to tell their parents part of the truth and ask for prom to be reinstated, in order to stop the investigation. Clay confesses to his parents he vandalized the school, destroyed the security cameras, and set fire to Principal Bolan's car, while Justin confesses he has relapsed. Charlie comes out as bisexual to his father, and Alex introduces Charlie as his boyfriend to his family. Jessica claims responsibility for the walkout. Ani goes to prom with Jessica, Tyler goes with Estela, Alex goes with Charlie, and Tony goes with his boyfriend Caleb. Alex and Charlie are both announced as prom kings, and Jessica ultimately chooses Justin over Diego. Winston imagines dancing with Monty, which gives him closure. While dancing with Jessica, Justin suddenly faints.
49	10	"Graduation"	Brian Yorkey	Brian Yorkey	June 5, 2020
Justin acquires undiagnosed HIV as a result of his prior drug use and unprotected sex work. Hiding his initial illnesses, he later develops AIDS and suffers through meningitis and pneumonia, ultimately dying. As a result, Clay suffers a severe breakdown and attempts suicide by cop but is dissuaded by Sheriff Diaz. A month later, Clay is chosen to give the graduation speech while Tony is encouraged by his father and Caleb to go to college. Alex confesses to Winston the truth about Bryce's murder, but Winston decides not to turn Alex in because, although he loved Monty, he also loves Alex. Diaz tells Deputy Standall that Bryce's case is permanently closed while implying that he suspects the truth. After graduation, Clay imagines Justin and Bryce together, as Justin encourages Clay to find peace with Hannah's memory right before Clay meets Heidi, an incoming Brown freshman, and they plan to go out for coffee. Afterwards, the surviving tape recipients bury Hannah's tapes while Jessica states that Bryce, despite his cruelty, played a part in uniting them. Clay finds Justin's college admissions essay, wherein Justin considered Clay his brother and a positive influence in his life. Clay decides to continue therapy and leaves with Tony on a road trip.
