= Refugee Camp All-Stars =

American hip hop group

- Origin: New Jersey, United States
- Genre: Hip hop
- Years active: 1997
- Label: Arista Records

Refugee Camp All-Stars (sometimes called Refugee Crew or Refugee All-Stars) was a loosely defined American musical collective and production alias associated with the Fugees (Wyclef Jean, Lauryn Hill, and Pras) and their extended creative circle. Active primarily in the late 1990s, the name was used for various collaborations involving John Forté, Canibus, Akon, Melky Sedeck, Darryl Pearson, Free, and The Product G&B other affiliated artists. In some instances, the name functioned more as a production imprint than a performing group.

Although they did not release any full projects or studio albums under their own name, members of the collective were heavily involved in Wyclef Jean's 1997 debut solo album Wyclef Jean Presents The Carnival. They also produced remixes of Michael Jackson's "Blood on the Dance Floor" and "2 Bad" for his remix album Blood on the Dance Floor: HIStory in the Mix.

Their single "Avenues", featured on the soundtrack to the 1997 comedy film Money Talks, became a top 40 hit in the United States. That same year, their single "The Sweetest Thing" featuring Lauryn Hill, was released as part of the soundtrack for Love Jones. In 2001, they were featured on the single "Loving You (Ole Ole Ole)" by Brian Harvey.

== Discography ==
Singles

- March 1997: "The Sweetest Thing"
- 1997: "Avenues" - No. 35 U.S.
