= The Sweetest Thing (Refugee Camp All Stars song) =

Single by Refugee Camp All-Stars featuring Lauryn Hill

from the album Love Jones (soundtrack)
- Released: March 1997
- Recorded: 1996
- Genre: R&B; neo soul
- Length: 4:50
- Label: Ruffhouse; Columbia
- Songwriters: Lauryn Hill; Nelust Jean
- Producers: Lauryn Hill; Wyclef Jean

"The Sweetest Thing" is a 1997 single by Refugee Camp All-Stars featuring Lauryn Hill, released as part of the soundtrack for the romantic drama film Love Jones. The song credits Refugee Camp All-Stars as the primary artist, but only Hill appears on vocals, with production and songwriting by her and Wyclef Jean.

The song received critical acclaim, with several outlets deeming it a standout on the Love Jones soundtrack. It gained widespread radio play, reaching number two on the Billboard Hot R&B/Hip-Hop Airplay chart and number one on the Mainstream R&B/Hip-Hop Airplay chart. It also peaked within the top twenty on the UK Singles Chart. It was nominated at the 1998 Soul Train Lady of Soul Awards for Best R&B/Soul or Rap Song of the Year.

== Background and release ==
Released during the height of Hill's success with the Fugees, the song showcased her transition into a more personal, acoustic-driven solo style, and served as a precursor to her debut solo album The Miseducation of Lauryn Hill. It was originally released in 1997 as part of the soundtrack for the romantic drama film Love Jones. The track was credited to Refugee Camp All-Stars featuring Lauryn Hill, though Hill is the sole vocalist, with production and songwriting by Hill and Wyclef Jean.

A remix of the song by Salaam Remi—featuring different vocals and instrumentation—was later included on the Fugees' 2003 compilation album Greatest Hits, under the title "The Sweetest Thing (Mahogany Mix)". The remix samples "Theme from S.W.A.T." by Rhythm Heritage.

== Critical reception ==
Billboard called the song a "gorgeous acoustic mid-tempo ballad", comparing it to Hill's later solo work. In a retrospective review, Revolt described it as the "crown jewel" of the Love Jones soundtrack. NME praised the sample use of the track in H.E.R.'s 2021 song "Cheat Code" from her album Back of My Mind, describing the original as "a mellifluous neo-soul gem".

BET, Vibe, and TheGrio have all highlighted the song as a defining moment of 1990s Black film soundtracks.

== Legacy and cultural impact ==
In 2020, "The Sweetest Thing" was named one of Pandora's Most Thumbed Movie Songs of All Time, based on cumulative listener interactions. The song has also appeared in curated playlists like Apple Music's Neo-Soul Essentials and is frequently cited as a favorite by artists including John Legend and Jennifer Hudson. The song was covered live by PJ Morton in 2023.

It has been sampled by several artists, including:

- "Know That" by Mos Def (1999)
- "Crazy Love" by Ne-Yo feat. Fabolous (2010)
- "Ever Ever" by Teyana Taylor (2020)

== Charts ==
Chart performance for "The Sweetest Thing"
Chart (1997)	Peak position
UK Singles (OCC)	18
US Hot R&B/Hip-Hop Airplay (Billboard)	2
US Mainstream R&B/Hip-Hop Airplay (Billboard)	1

== Personnel ==
- Vocals: Lauryn Hill
- Writers: Lauryn Hill, Wyclef Jean
- Producers: Lauryn Hill, Wyclef Jean
