= Demascus =

2025 American comedy series

- Genre: Science fiction, comedy
- Created by: Tearrance Arvelle Chisholm
- Showrunners: Tearrance Arvelle Chisholm; Kirk A. Moore
- Starring: Okieriete Onaodowan; Janet Hubert; Caleb Eberhardt; Shakira Ja'nai Paye
- Country of origin: United States
- No. of seasons: 1
- No. of episodes: 6

Production
- Executive producers: Tearrance Arvelle Chisholm; Myki Bajaj; Mark Johnson; Kirk A. Moore; Solvan "Slick" Naim
- Production companies: AMC Studios; Gran Via Productions

Original release
- Network: Tubi
- Release: August 7, 2025

Demascus is an American sci-fi comedy series. The show was created by Tearrance Arvelle Chisholm and stars Okieriete Onaodowan in the titular role as a 33-year-old Black man that engages in a virtual reality experiment. The series was released by Tubi on August 7, 2025. It received positive reception.

== Synopsis ==
"The comedic, genre-fluid, coming-of-age series follows a 33-year-old Black man who navigates the field of digital psychiatry while trying to discover his truest self."

== Cast ==
=== Main ===
- Okieriete Onaodowan as Demascus
- Janet Hubert as Dr. Bonnetville, Demascus' therapist
- Caleb Eberhardt as Redd, a public defender and Demascus' best friend
- Shakira Ja’nai Paye as Naomi, an artist

=== Recurring ===
- Martin Lawrence, Demascus' Uncle Forty
- Brittany Adebumola as Shaena, Demascus' sister
- Sasha Hutchings as Budhi, Demascus' girlfriend
- Brie Eley as Shekinah, Demascus' virtual assistant

== Episodes ==
No.	Title	Directed by	Written by	Original release date
1	"Pilot"	Solvan "Slick" Naim	Tearrance Arvelle Chisholm	August 7, 2025
2	"Establishing Episode"	Solvan "Slick" Naim	Lauren Glover & Nathan Alan Davis	August 7, 2025
3	"Anthology"	Theodore Witcher	Aalia Brown	August 7, 2025
4	"The Thanksgiving Episode"	Theodore Witcher	Theodore Witcher	August 7, 2025
5	"Penultimate"	Destiny Ekaragha	Kirk A. Moore	August 7, 2025
6	"Season Two Prequel"	Destiny Ekaragha	Tearrance Arvelle Chisholm	August 7, 2025

== Production ==
The series is based on a script written by Tearrance Arvelle Chisholm. It is produced by Mark Johnson and Myki Bajaj of Gran Via Productions, and Kirk A. Moore, who is also the co-showrunner with Chisholm. The series has six episodes.

AMC ordered Demascus in 2022 as an original series; however, it was shelved in 2023. In 2025 a partnership between AMC Networks and Tubi resulted in Tubi picking up the series as a Tubi Original.

== Release ==
The series was released on August 7, 2025 on Tubi.

== Reception ==
Demascus received mainly positive reception according to Rotten Tomatoes, where it received 86% positive reviews based on seven critics' reviews. Robert Lloyd of the Los Angeles Times praised the writing as “sharp and smart and natural" in addition to the direction and the performances.
