= Embrya =

Studio album by Maxwell
- Released: June 30, 1998
- Recorded: 1996–98
- Genres: Contemporary R&B; soul; neo soul
- Length: 62:57
- Label: Columbia
- Producers: Maxwell, Stuart Matthewman

Maxwell chronology
MTV Unplugged (1997)	Embrya (1998)	Now (2001)

Singles from Embrya
- 1. "Luxury: Cococure" Released: June 20, 1998; 2. "Matrimony: Maybe You" Released: December 29, 1998

Embrya is the second studio album by American recording artist Maxwell, released on June 30, 1998, by Columbia Records. As on his 1996 debut album Maxwell's Urban Hang Suite, he collaborated with record producer and Sade member Stuart Matthewman. A neo soul album, Embrya features heavy basslines, string arrangements, and an emphasis on groove over melodies. It has themes of love and spirituality.

== Background ==
With a lesser jazz emphasis than his debut album, Embrya continues the trend towards heavy basslines and string arrangements, and it focuses on themes such as love and spirituality. However, the album features more of an emphasis on groove than melodies. Its production sound contains bassy, electronic and slight syncopated beats. Maxwell has defined the album's title as "an approaching growing transition thought to be contained but destined for broader perception."

== Critical reception ==
Professional ratings
Review scores
Source	Rating
AllMusic	3/5 stars
Chicago Sun-Times	2.5/4 stars
The Encyclopedia of Popular Music	4/5 stars
Entertainment Weekly	B+
Los Angeles Times	3.5/4 stars
Pitchfork	8.3/10
Q	3/5 stars
Rolling Stone	3.5/5 stars
Spin	7/10
USA Today	3.5/4 stars

Embrya was originally received unfavorably by many critics. In the Chicago Tribune, Greg Kot wrote that the record "functions primarily as background music, sustaining its contemplative tone and percolating groove almost too well". Ann Powers of The New York Times called Maxwell "an expert seducer" and the music "the aural equivalent of lotion rubbed on one's back by someone interesting", but believed the lyrics lacked substance. Greg Tate wrote in Spin that the album "comes off as a tad New Agey, art-rock pretentious, emotionally calculated, and sappy." Dream Hampton, writing in The Village Voice, said that the "listless and unfocused" songwriting does not redeem the "ridiculous, loaded song titles" and found the music "lazy": "The band drones along as if in some somnambulant session that never ends." In The Village Voice, Robert Christgau cited "Luxury: Cococure" as a "choice cut", indicating "a good song on an album that isn't worth your time or money". Stephen Thomas Erlewine deemed Embrya "a bit of a sophomore stumble, albeit one with promising moments", while writing in AllMusic, "[Maxwell] overstuffs his songs with ideas that lead nowhere". In (The New) Rolling Stone Album Guide (2004), Arion Berger assigned the album two stars out of five, and found the songs monotonous and called the album "unfocused and pretentious ... full of overwrought, underwritten songs with obscure, fancy titles revolving around a sort of sexual gnosticism."

In a positive review, Connie Johnson from the Los Angeles Times viewed Maxwell's music as unique and the album as an improvement from his debut album, which was "somewhat derivative". Rob Sheffield of Rolling Stone magazine complimented its lush musical backdrops and found the songs "pretty wonderful, even though they're impossible to tell apart or to remember after they're done." David Browne, writing in Entertainment Weekly, called the album "beautiful R&B background music" and felt that, despite vague and pretentious lyrics, it serves as "the culmination of the retro-soul movement that began taking shape several years ago." Amy Linden of Vibe called it "neo-soul via ambience" and said that "like smoke, Maxwell's love songs drift away, fading ever so seductively into the background, where they stay." Critics have since reappraised Embrya as a groundbreaking forerunner to later trends in Alternative R&B, and Columbia Records reissued the album in 2018 on its 20th anniversary. Embrya was nominated for a Grammy Award for Best R&B Album, losing to Lauryn Hill's The Miseducation of Lauryn Hill (1998). In 1999, it won the Soul Train Music Award for Best Male Soul/R&B Album.

In 2024, Uncut ranked the album at number 110 in their list of "The 500 Greatest Albums of the 1990s", describing it as a "mighty smooth" record inspired by the "longform works" of Marvin Gaye and D'Angelo and writing that "the result is more distinct and enduring than was reckoned at the time."

== Commercial performance ==
Embrya was released on June 10, 1998. It sold more than one million copies and garnered Maxwell a new alternative fanbase, but confounded urban consumers. On May 26, 1999, the album was certified platinum by the Recording Industry Association of America (RIAA).

== Track listing ==
All tracks are written by Maxwell (credited as Musze), except where noted.

No.	Title	Writer(s)	Length
1.	"Gestation: Mythos"		3:11
2.	"Everwanting: To Want You to Want"		7:30
3.	"I'm You: You Are Me and We Are You (Pt. Me & You)"		6:31
4.	"Luxury: Cococure"		5:30
5.	"Drowndeep: Hula"	Stuart Matthewman, Musze	5:39
6.	"Matrimony: Maybe You"		4:37
7.	"Arroz con pollo"		2:55
8.	"Know These Things: Shouldn't You"	Matthewman, Musze	5:14
9.	"Submerge: Til We Become the Sun"		6:24
10.	"Gravity: Pushing to Pull"	Matthewman, Musze	6:11
11.	"Eachhoureachsecondeachminuteeachday: Of My Life"		5:51
12.	"Embrya"		3:04
Total length:			62:57

Notes:

- "Gestation: Mythos" on initial CD pressings is a pregap track, later pressings include it as track 1, thus pushing the other track numbers forward by one. A 2019 remaster approved by Maxwell places the track at the end of the album.

== Personnel ==
Credits are adapted from Allmusic.

- Gloria Agostini – harp
- Chris Apostle – production coordination
- Carl Carter – bass
- Tom Coyne – mastering
- Clark Gayton – trombone
- Kerry Griffin – drums
- Lisa Guastella – production coordination assistant
- Russell Gunn – trumpet
- Reggie Hamilton – bass, nylon-string guitar
- Bashiri Johnson – percussion
- Gene Lake – drums
- Glen Marchese – engineer, mixing
- Stuart Matthewman – beats, guitar, mixing, producer, programming, baritone saxophone
- Maxwell – beats, engineer, horn arrangements, mixing, producer, vocals
- Greg Moore – guitar
- Mike Pela – associate producer, mixing
- Julian Peploe – art direction
- Susan Poliacik – cello
- Matthew Raimondi – violin
- Andrew Richardson – stylist
- Daniel Sadownick – percussion
- Veronica Salas – viola
- Darrell Smith – beats, engineer, producer
- Mario Sorrenti – phjo
- Gerald Tarack – violin

== Charts ==
=== Weekly charts ===
Chart (1998)	Peak position
Australian Albums (ARIA)	20
Canada Top Albums/CDs (RPM)	42
Dutch Albums (Album Top 100)	29
European Top 100 Albums (Music & Media)	43
French Albums (SNEP)	23
New Zealand Albums (RMNZ)	39
Scottish Albums (Official Charts)	80
Swedish Albums (Sverigetopplistan)	10
Swiss Albums (Schweizer Hitparade)	38
UK Albums (Official Charts)	11
UK R&B Albums (Official Charts)	1
US Billboard 200	3
US Top R&B/Hip-Hop Albums (Billboard)	2

=== Year-end charts ===
Chart (1998)	Position
US Billboard 200	117
US Top R&B/Hip-Hop Albums (Billboard)	32
Chart (1999)	Position
US Top R&B/Hip-Hop Albums (Billboard)	99

== Certifications ==
Region	Certification	Certified units/sales
United States (RIAA)	Platinum	1,000,000^{^}
^{^} Shipments figures based on certification alone.

== Bibliography ==
- Berger, Arion; et al. (November 2, 2004). Brackett, Nathan; Hoard, Christian (eds.). The New Rolling Stone Album Guide (4th ed.). Simon & Schuster. ISBN 0-7432-0169-8.
