= Luxury: Cococure =

Single by Maxwell

from the album Embrya
- Released: June 9, 1998
- Recorded: 1996–97
- Genre: Funk; soul; R&B
- Length: 5:30
- Label: Columbia
- Songwriter(s): Musze
- Producer(s): MUSZE (Maxwell); Stuart Matthewman

Maxwell singles chronology
"Sumthin' Sumthin'" (1996)	"Luxury: Cococure" (1998)	"Matrimony: Maybe You" (1998)

"Luxury: Cococure" is a song by American R&B singer Maxwell, released in June 1998 by Columbia Records as the first single from his second album, Embrya (1998). The song was written by him and co-produced with Stuart Matthewman. It received heavy radio play on mainstream pop and r&b radio markets, but failed to reach either the US Billboard Hot 100 or R&B songs chart. The single peaked to no. 16 on Hot R&B/Hip-Hop Airplay in 1998.

== Critical reception ==
Larry Flick from Billboard magazine wrote, "Sophomore jinx? Not for this gifted young artist. Maxwell previews his hotly anticipated second set, Embrya, with a sleek funk jam that expands upon the steamy romance of his debut—while revealing a far more confident and primal side of his personality. Within the song's richly textured arrangement, a slippery bassline glides over a rugged beat, supporting plush keyboards and swirling strings. There is no question that this single will flood R&B airwaves within seconds. Perhaps popsters would be wise to join the party a little earlier this time around."

== Charts ==
Chart (1998)	Peak position
US Hot R&B/Hip-Hop Airplay (Billboard)	16
US Urban AC (Billboard)	2
