= Matrimony: Maybe You =

Single by Maxwell

from the album Embrya
- Released: December 29, 1998
- Recorded: 1997–98
- Genre: Soul; R&B
- Length: 4:31
- Label: Columbia
- Songwriter(s): Musze
- Producer(s): Musze (Maxwell); Stuart Matthewman

Maxwell singles chronology
"Luxury: Cococure" (1998)	"Matrimony: Maybe You" (1998)	"Fortunate" (1999)

Music video
- "Matrimony: Maybe You" on YouTube

"Matrimony: Maybe You" is a song by American soul singer Maxwell. Released in 1998 as the follow-up single to "Luxury Cococure", the song was a modest radio airplay hit, and peaked at no. 79 on Billboard Hot R&B/Hip-Hop Songs chart.

== Critical reception ==
Larry Flick of Billboard wrote, "If you've made the mistake of not investigating Maxwell's gorgeous second album, "Embrya", use this fine single as an excuse to finally do so. One of the leading figures of the alterna-soul movement, he deftly combines current hip-hop concepts with old-school R&B flavors with remarkable ease—without sounding like just another kid with a great record collection. This shuffling jam crackles with tight live instrumentation and a falsetto-sprinkled vocal that reverently recalls Marvin Gaye."

== Charts ==
Chart (1999)	Peak position
US Billboard Hot R&B/Hip-Hop Songs	79
