= Sumthin' Sumthin' =

Single by Maxwell

from the album Maxwell's Urban Hang Suite and Love Jones: The Music
- Released: December 1996
- Recorded: 1995
- Genre: Neo soul; R&B
- Length: 4:18
- Label: Columbia
- Songwriters: Maxwell, Leon Ware
- Producer: Maxwell

Maxwell singles chronology
"Ascension (Don't Ever Wonder)" (1996)	"Sumthin' Sumthin'" (1996)	"Luxury: Cococure" (1998)

Music video
- "Sumthin' Sumthin'" on YouTube

"Sumthin' Sumthin'" is a mid-uptempo song by American neo soul singer Maxwell, released as the third single from his debut album, Urban Hang Suite. It peaked at number 22 on the Billboard Hot Dance Music/Maxi-Singles Sales chart in the US. An alternate version of the song, titled "Sumthin' Sumthin': Mellosmoothe", was released as a single from the soundtrack album to the film Love Jones (1997). The soundtrack album's single peaked at number 23 on the Hot R&B/Hip-Hop Singles & Tracks chart. The song scored him a second UK top 40 peaking to 27 on UK Singles chart. The woman featured in the song's music video is French fashion model Chrystele Saint-Louis Augustin.

== Critical reception ==
Christopher A. Daniel from Albumsism wrote that "Sumthin' Sumthin" is "an inviting track hinting at Maxwell trying to get someone’s attention, filling in the blanks with rhythmic handclaps and syrupy Larry Graham-styled bass slaps." Ralph Tee from Music Week's RM Dance Update rated the song four out of five, saying that it is "the most exciting new soul record of the year so far. While steeped in the tradition of the greatest R&B, 22-year-old Maxwell fuses acoustic sounds with the most soulful of vocals on this blissful mid-paced funk groove that heads straight for the D'Angelo and Don-E market." He added, "Hear the music, feel the quality."

== Charts and certifications ==
=== Weekly charts ===
Chart (1997)	Peak position
Scotland (OCC)	65
UK Singles (OCC)	27
US Hot Dance Music/Maxi-Singles Sales (Billboard)	22
US R&B/Hip-Hop Songs (Billboard)	23

=== Certifications ===
Region	Certification	Certified units/sales
United States (RIAA)	Gold	500,000^{‡}
^{‡} Sales+streaming figures based on certification alone.
