= Shakira Ja'nai Paye =

American actress, writer, producer and comedian

Shakira Ja'nai Paye is an American actress, writer, producer, and comedian. She is a co-founder of the sketch troupe Obama's Other Daughters. She has acted in productions including All Day and a Night, the House Party reboot, and the sc-ifi series Demascus.

== Life and career ==
Paye was born and raised in Baltimore. She began acting at the Arena Players at age 10 and was a theatre major in high school. She later trained at American Musical Dramatic Academy.

Paye is a co-founder of the sketch troupe Obama's Other Daughters alongside Ashley Holston, Maame-Yaa Aforo, and Yazmin Monet Watkins. The group, all Black women comedians who met on UCB's diversity Facebook group, formed in 2016. They hosted a monthly show, Black Girl Magic, at UCB Sunset in Los Angeles. The group had a digital series on Comedy Central that was produced by Hacks co-creators Paul W. Downs and Lucia Aniello. They also hosted the culture podcast You Down? through Shondaland Audio.

Paye appeared in The Gambler, Modern Family, Black-ish, Grand Crew, and Sydney to the Max. She starred in the film All Day and a Night (2020) on Netflix. She also appeared in the House Party (2023) reboot.

Paye is a main cast member in the sci-fi comedy series Demascus (2025– ), which was initially picked up AMC and cancelled, but later revived by Tubi. She portrays Naomi, a love interest to the lead who embodies "the dark feminine: Cleopatra-esque, Lilith, Kali… all of my favorite ladies, but grounded and human."

== Accolades ==
- 2021 – BlogHer VOTY 100 Honoree (for Obama's Other Daughters)
