= Kirk A. Moore =

American writer and producer

Kirk A. Moore is an American writer and producer. He was a staff writer for 13 Reasons Why, American Crime, and both writer and producer for Runaways. He was a supervising producer on For Life and Jack Ryan. Moore was a co-executive producer for The Irrational (2023–2025). In recently, he served as co-showrunner and executive producer of Demascus.

== Awards and nominations ==
Organization	Year	Category	Work	Result	Ref.
Black Reel Awards for Television	2017	Outstanding Writing, TV Movie/Limited Series	American Crime (for "Season Three: Episode Seven")	Nominated	
Writers Guild of America	2017	Television: Long Form – Original	American Crime (Shared with: Julie Hébert, Sonay Hoffman, Keith Huff, Stacy A. Littlejohn, Davy Perez, Diana Son)	Nominated	
