= Theodore Witcher =

American screenwriter and director

- Born: 1969 (age 56–57); United States
- Occupations: Film director, screenwriter
- Notable work: Love Jones

Theodore Witcher (born 1969) is an American writer and director. He is known for writing and directing the film Love Jones (1997).

== Filmography ==
=== Film ===
- Love Jones (1997) – writer and director
- Body Count (1998) – writer

=== Television ===
- Games People Play (2019–2021) – writer (4 episodes)
- Demascus (2025) – writer (1 episode) and director (2 episodes)
