= Ascension (Don't Ever Wonder) =

Single by Maxwell

from the album Maxwell's Urban Hang Suite
- B-side: "Lock You Up N' Love Fa Days"
- Released: July 1996
- Recorded: 1995
- Genre: Neo soul; funk; psychedelic soul
- Length: 5:46 (album version); 4:15 (video edit)
- Label: Columbia
- Songwriters: Maxwell; Itaal Shur
- Producer: Maxwell

Maxwell singles chronology
"...Til the Cops Come Knockin'" (1996)	"Ascension (Don't Ever Wonder)" (1996)	"Sumthin' Sumthin'" (1996)

Music video
- "Ascension (Don't Ever Wonder)" on YouTube

"Ascension (Don't Ever Wonder) is a song by American R&B/neo soul singer Maxwell, released in July 1996 by Columbia Records as the second single from his debut album, Maxwell's Urban Hang Suite (1996). The song was written by Maxwell and Itaal Shur, and he also produced it. It received favorable reviews from music critics and peaked at number eight on the US Billboard R&B/Hip-Hop Songs chart, numbers 36 and 25 on the Billboard Hot 100 and Cash Box Top 100. In Europe, the song reached number 28 on the UK Singles Chart. The accompanying music video was directed by Liz Friedlander. The B side of the single is "Lock You Up N' Love Fa Days", which was previously unreleased and also written and produced by Musze.

== Critical reception ==
Larry Flick from Billboard magazine wrote that the song continues to revisit the classic soul ground first mined by legends like Marvin Gaye and Smokey Robinson. He remarked, "Cruising at a chilled midtempo pace, Maxwell flexes his voice to falsetto heights while also displaying a rich lower register that's so sexy. Wrap in a rubbery bassline and jiggly funk guitars and you have a tasty single". Monyca D. Coleman from Indianapolis Recorder praised it as "brilliant". Pan-European magazine Music & Media stated, "It won't take long for the world to discover the Next Big Thing In Soul Music. Maxwell is quickly capturing hearts all over the world. He even got TAFKAP to do the sound of his recent Paris show. He oozes charisma and he has the musical clout to back it up. He glides his way through this mid-tempo smoothie with a delicious deep bass and wah wah guitars."

A reviewer from Music Week gave it three out of five, describing it as a "dreamy soul offering", that "could see him making inroads into the charts." Bob Jones from Muzik said it's "the next best thing since soul was invented. Awesome, truly awesome!" Malaysian newspaper New Straits Times' commented, "Forget about Viagra, this is the real thing! If ethereal tracks like 'Ascension', 'Whenever, Wherever' and '...Til the Cops Keep Knockin'' don't raise body temperatures, you're in serious "shagadelic" trouble my friend. Lights off, stimulus on!" Damien Mendis from the RM Dance Update praised the track, writing, "The class just oozes out of the speakers. He lays down sophisticated soul that will have purists gagging at the first four bars." He added, "So good it hurts." San Antonio Express-News described it as "slinky". A writer for Vibe called it a "smooth" and "slow" track, with a "sultry mood".

== Chart performance ==
"Ascension (Don't Ever Wonder)" debuted on the Billboard Hot R&B/Hip-Hop Singles & Tracks chart in the US in August 1996, at number 11, eventually peaking at number eight and spending 29 weeks on the chart. It also spent eighteen weeks on the Billboard Hot 100, peaking at number 36 on September 28, 1996. In Europe, the single reached the Top 30 in the UK, peaking at number 28 on the UK Singles Chart. But it was even more successful on the UK R&B Chart, peaking at number six. Additionally, it also charted in Scotland, reaching number 52.

== Retrospective response ==
In 2020, Christopher A. Daniel from Albumism stated that the song "keeps the groove in motion". AllMusic editor Stephen Cook named it one of the highlights from Maxwell's Urban Hang Suite. Daryl Easlea for BBC in 2009 felt it "was the rightful hit single".

== Music video ==
The music video for the song was directed by American music video and television director and television producer Liz Friedlander. At the beginning, Maxwell stands alone, dancing in the dark in a room that is a large stage surrounded by white screens. As he begins to sing, the light slowly turns on the singer. He is dressed in a shiny gray outfit and a band is now performing around him on stage. Throughout the video, different people are entering the room through a large oval opening. Towards the end, these people are dancing among the musicians while Maxwell sings until the end of the video. The video for "Ascension (Don't Ever Wonder)" was later made available on Maxwell's official YouTube channel, remastered in 4K, in 2009 and had generated more than 132 million views as of late 2025.

== Track listing ==
12" single, Europe (1996)
No.	Title	Length
1.	"Ascension No One's Gonna Love You, So Don't Ever Wonder" (The Tribute Uncut)
2.	"Ascension No One's Gonna Love You, So Don't Ever Wonder" (The Tribute Unsung)
3.	"Ascension Don't Ever Wonder" (Uncut)
4.	"Dub Ever Wonder (Ascension)"

12" single, US (1996)
No.	Title	Length
1.	"Ascension No One's Gonna Love You, So Don't Ever Wonder" (The Tribute Cut)
2.	"Ascension No One's Gonna Love You, So Don't Ever Wonder" (Uncut)
3.	"Ascension No One's Gonna Love You, So Don't Ever Wonder" (Unsung)
4.	"Dub Ever Wonder (Ascension)"
5.	"Ascension Don't Ever Wonder" (Uncut)
6.	"Lock You Up N' Love Fa Days"

CD single, Europe (1996)
No.	Title	Length
1.	"Ascension Don't Ever Wonder" (Cut)	3:47
2.	"Ascension No One's Gonna Love You, So Don't Ever Wonder" (The Tribute Uncut)	5:48

CD maxi, Europe (1996)
No.	Title	Length
1.	"Ascension Don't Ever Wonder" (No One's Gonna Love You, So Don't Ever Wonder The Tribute Uncut)	4:18
2.	"Ascension Don't Ever Wonder" (Dub Ever Wonder Ascension)	3:28
3.	"Lock You Up N' Love Fa Days"	5:26
4.	"Lock You Up N' Love Fa Days" (Unsung)	5:28

CD maxi, UK (1996)
No.	Title	Length
1.	"Ascension Don't Ever Wonder" (Uncut)
2.	"Ascension No One's Gonna Love You, So Don't Ever Wonder" (The Tribute Uncut)
3.	"Ascension No One's Gonna Love You, So Don't Ever Wonder" (The Tribute Unsung)
4.	"Reunion"

CD single, US (1997)
No.	Title	Length
1.	"Ascension Don't Ever Wonder" (Uncut)
2.	"Ascension No One's Gonna Love You, So Don't Ever Wonder" (The Tribute Uncut)
3.	"Ascension No One's Gonna Love You, So Don't Ever Wonder" (The Tribute Unsung)
4.	"Reunion"

== Charts and certifications ==
=== Weekly charts ===
Chart (1996–1997)	Peak position
Europe (European Dance Radio)	7
Scotland (OCC)	52
UK Singles (OCC)	28
UK R&B (OCC)	6
US Billboard Hot 100	36
US R&B/Hip-Hop Songs (Billboard)	8
US Cash Box Top 100	25

=== Certifications ===
Region	Certification	Certified units/sales
New Zealand (RMNZ)	Gold	15,000^{‡}
United Kingdom (BPI)	Silver	200,000^{‡}
United States (RIAA)	Platinum	1,000,000^{‡}
^{‡} Sales+streaming figures based on certification alone.
