= Maxwell's Urban Hang Suite =

Studio album by Maxwell
- Released: April 2, 1996
- Recorded: 1994–1995
- Studios: Electric Lady; RPM; Sorcerer; Chung King (New York); CRC (Chicago)
- Genres: R&B; neo soul; soul; retro-soul
- Length: 64:47
- Label: Columbia
- Producers: Maxwell; Peter Mokran; Stuart Matthewman

Maxwell chronology
Maxwell's Urban Hang Suite (1996)	MTV Unplugged (1997)

Singles from Maxwell's Urban Hang Suite
- 1. "...Til the Cops Come Knockin'" Released: May 15, 1996; 2. "Ascension (Don't Ever Wonder)" Released: July 30, 1996; 3. "Sumthin' Sumthin'" Released: December 1996; 4. "Suitelady (The Proposal Jam)" Released: May 1997

Maxwell's Urban Hang Suite is the debut album by American R&B singer-songwriter Maxwell. It was recorded in 1994 and 1995 and released on April 2, 1996, by Columbia Records.

Maxwell largely wrote and produced the album himself, recording in sessions at Electric Lady Studios, RPM, Sorcerer, and Chung King Studios in New York City, and CRC recording studios in Chicago. The resulting music features a mellow, groove-based sound with elements of funk, jazz, smooth soul, and quiet storm. A concept album, Maxwell's Urban Hang Suite was composed as a song cycle that focuses on an adult romance, based in part on Maxwell's personal experiences.

Maxwell's Urban Hang Suite was not an immediate commercial success, but it was helped by the release of its second single "Ascension (Don't Ever Wonder)" in July 1996, and the album eventually became a million-seller. It was also a success with critics, who praised it as a departure from the mainstream, hip hop-oriented R&B of the time, while earning Maxwell several accolades and comparisons to soul singers of the past, particularly Marvin Gaye and Prince.

The success of Maxwell's Urban Hang Suite elevated Maxwell's reputation to that of a sex symbol and a notable performer in the music industry. He was credited with shaping the "neo soul" movement of musicians that rose to prominence during the late 1990s. Along with D'Angelo's Brown Sugar (1995) and Erykah Badu's Baduizm (1997), the album provided commercial exposure to neo soul and has since been cited by several critics as Maxwell's greatest work.

== Background ==
After receiving a low-cost Casio keyboard from a friend, Brooklyn, New York-native Maxwell began composing material at age 17. Raised in the borough's East New York-section, Maxwell's previous musical experience included his beginnings as a singer in the congregation of his Baptist church, which had become an integral part of his life after the death of his father in a plane crash. Already a fan of what he described as "jheri curl soul", which was the trademark of early 1980s R&B acts such as Patrice Rushen, S.O.S. Band and Rose Royce, Maxwell began to teach himself to play a variety of instruments. According to him, the R&B of the early 1980s contained "the perfect combination of computerized instrumentation with a live feel", and that the genre's dynamics later became lost due to the influence of hip hop on R&B. Despite facing ridicule from classmates for being shy and awkward, he progressed and continued to develop his musical abilities.

At 19, Maxwell began performing throughout the New York club circuit while supporting himself by waiting tables during the day. He was able to gain access to a 24 track recording studio and started to record songs for a demo tape, which he circulated among his friends. The demo engendered interest, and his official debut concert performance at Manhattan nightclub Nell's drew a crowd. During the next two years, Maxwell wrote and recorded over three hundred songs and played frequently at small venues throughout New York City. Maxwell's performances continued to draw interest and increase the buzz about him, and he was called "the next Prince" by a writer from Vibe magazine who attended one of his shows. After earning a considerable reputation, Maxwell signed a recording contract with Columbia Records in 1994. He adopted his middle name as a moniker out of respect for his family's privacy.

== Recording and production ==
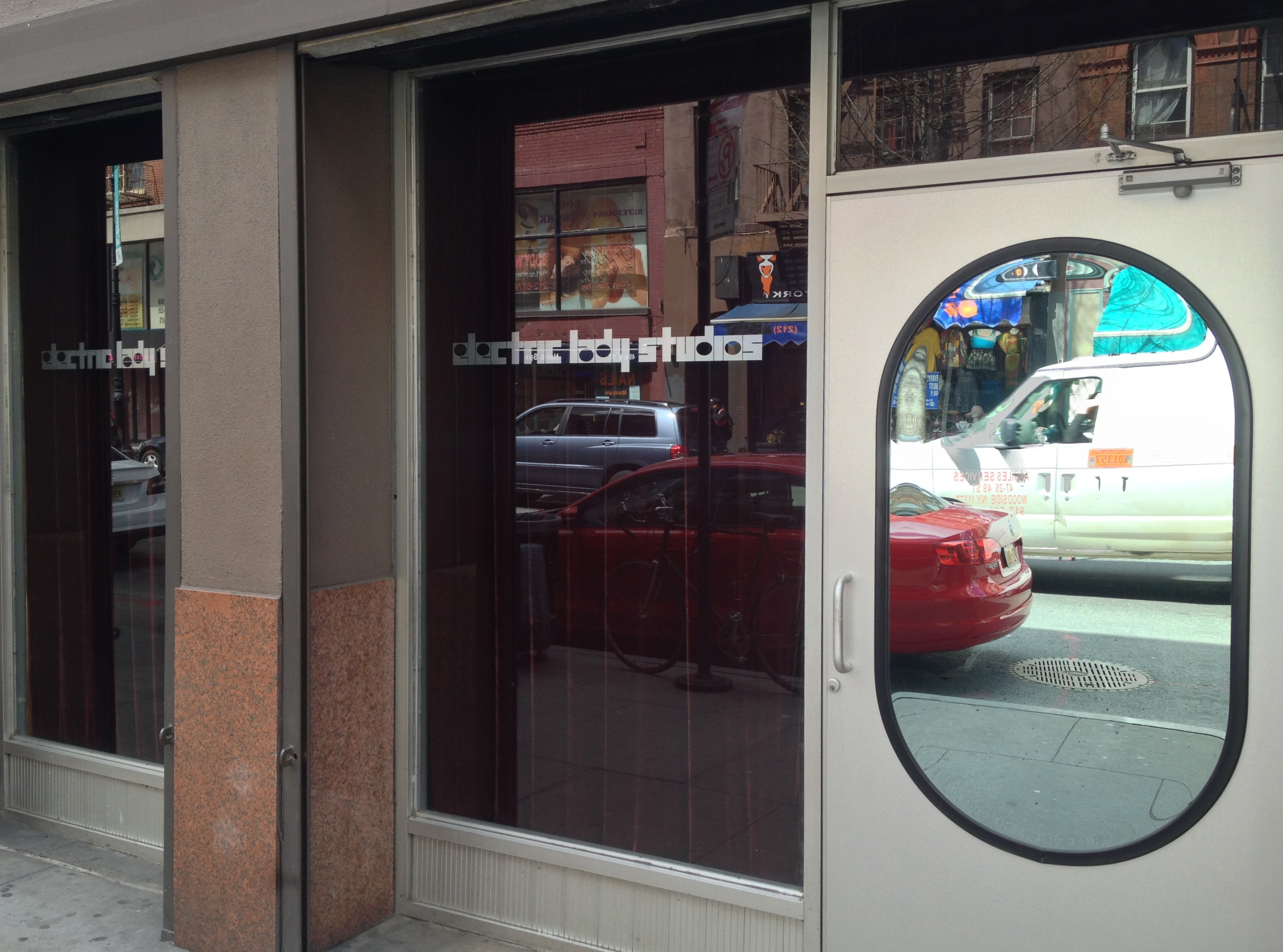
Electric Lady Studios (entrance pictured) in New York City, where part of the album was recorded

Maxwell recorded his debut album between 1994 and 1995 at Electric Lady Studios, RPM Studios, Sorcerer Studios and Chung King Studios in New York City, and at CRC Studios in Chicago, Illinois. Maxwell's Urban Hang Suite was produced primarily by Peter Mokran, who was credited as P.M., and Maxwell, who was credited as "MUSZE", a play on the word muse. Columbia executives reluctantly gave Maxwell creative freedom in his contract and were hesitant to allow him produce the album alone. They assigned Chicago-based, English producer and multi-instrumentalist Stuart Matthewman to the project, but he only produced the first few tracks. Matthewman had previously worked with English R&B and jazz group Sade. During the recording sessions, Maxwell worked extensively with collaborators, including Matthewman, soul singer-songwriter Leon Ware, and funk guitarist Melvin "Wah-Wah Watson" Ragin. Prior to working with Maxwell, Ware and Ragin were collaborators of soul musician Marvin Gaye; Ware had produced and composed most of Gaye's tenth album I Want You (1976).

Production assistance and instrumentation from such veteran session musicians contributed significantly to Urban Hang Suite's vintage overtones and classic R&B influences. Matthewman and Maxwell played several instruments during recording for the album, including guitar, drums, saxophone, bass, and keyboards. They also composed three of the album's eleven tracks together. After the recording sessions ended in March 1995, Urban Hang Suite was mixed by P.M. (Peter Mokran) and audio engineer Mike Pela, after which it was mastered by Tom Coyne at Sterling Sound in New York City.

== Music and lyrics ==
"Sumthin' Sumthin'"
"Sumthin' Sumthin'" was written by Maxwell and Leon Ware.

Although one of his earliest influences was early 1980s urban R&B, Maxwell's Urban Hang Suite was inspired by the sounds and themes of classic soul artists such as Marvin Gaye, Curtis Mayfield, Barry White, Stevie Wonder and Prince. According to Prince biographer Alex Hahn, Maxwell adopts the singer's sound and style, particularly from songs such as "Do Me, Baby" (1982) and "Pink Cashmere" (1993), while The New York Times's Amy Linden said that he "melds a soft-spoken singing style with the fluid, spacious grooves often associated with the cocktail funk of Sade". Critics have also noted Maxwell's falsetto singing voice, and the music's atmospheric, funky instrumentation, featuring mellow horns, wah wah guitar, Rhodes piano and deep, articulate bass lines. The tempo of the songs slowly diminishes through the course of the album's songs. One critic attributes the tempo decrease to Stuart Matthewman's production. The album contains elements of funk, jazz, contemporary R&B and quiet storm, and it is mostly composed of sexual balladry and slow jams.

A concept album, Maxwell's Urban Hang Suite is a song cycle that focuses on an adult romance from first encounter to its dramatic conclusion. Over the course of the album, Maxwell details a single passionate encounter. Throughout, it examines the concept with lyrical themes of love, sex and spirituality, as well as issues such as commitment, marriage and monogamy. Maxwell has described the themes and his thoughts on romance as "idealistic" on Urban Hang Suite. Rolling Stone editor David Fricke compared the album's concept to that of Marvin Gaye's 1978 record Here, My Dear, which dealt with his divorce, saying that Maxwell's Urban Hang Suite had been reworked as a treatise on monogamy. The album has been noted for the sincerity of Maxwell's lyrics, which depict a man's weakness and vulnerability to a woman's love. In an interview with music journalist Mark Coleman, Maxwell cited his respect for African-American women as the inspiration for the respectful nature of his lyrics towards women. Maxwell told Interview's Dimitri Erhlich that his main muse for Urban Hang Suite was women, and further elaborated on his inspiration, stating:

I think creativity is innately feminine. Obviously women at 12 or 13 get either cursed or blessed with the fact that they're vessels for human life to come through. And that's what music--what creativity--is to me. I guess being a man is a truly physical state and mentally it's a little bit limiting. But what I'm talking about is not a person's 'female side' or 'male side'. The only way I can pay homage to that feminine thing--not necessarily women but to what they represent as creative forces--is by getting artistic and making music.

Maxwell also cited his grandmother and other West Indian women he knows as the inspiration behind his romantic notions. Music journalists inferred that the album was inspired by or based on an unsuccessful affair in Maxwell's life. Maxwell said in an interview, "I'm so innately romantic and always have been, and I went through this particular romantic experience and based my album on that". The album's liner notes have a dedication from Maxwell to his "musze", stating "I could never have done this without you".

"Ascension (Don't Ever Wonder)"
The funk and gospel-influenced "Ascension (Don't Ever Wonder)" was co-written by Itaal Shur.

The album opens with an instrumental track, "The Urban Theme", which begins with the sound of a stylus dropping on a vinyl record. The track's prominent funk sound is reminiscent of the music of the Brand New Heavies. "Welcome" features the album's prominent sexual vibe, and contains a quiet storm sound and saxophone. The two opening tracks both contain prominent funk influence. Roni Sarig wrote that their "early '80s full-band R&B and jazz pop grooves are reminiscent of Maze's brightest days and Steely Dan's coolest nights." The funk-influenced "Sumthin' Sumthin'", which was co-written by Leon Ware, contains a strong, rhythmically tight groove created by the implementation of the "pocket" bass technique. Co-written by songwriter Itaal Shur, "Ascension (Don't Ever Wonder)" opens with a funky groove and bass line, and features a forceful rhythm and rough funk sound. The song contains strong gospel overtones with references to God in the lyrics. The song has been covered by gospel artists such as Londa Larmond and LaShun Pace.

Cited by Blender magazine as one of the "Greatest Make-Out Songs of All Time", "...Til the Cops Come Knockin'" contains sexually explicit lyrics and a slower tempo than its preceding tracks. It also contains the sound of distant sirens and "grinding porn-movie" guitar licks. The songs "Whenever Wherever Whatever" and "Lonely's the Only Company (I & II)" are ballads that contain themes of vulnerability to love. "Suitelady (The Proposal Jam)" completes the album's concept of monogamy with lyrics depicting a marriage proposal from Maxwell. Maxwell's Urban Hang Suite closes with the instrumental track "The Suite Theme". While the length of the track is listed as 13:47 minutes, the song ends after 6:00 minutes, followed by a period of silence, before resuming with a hidden track, which consists of 1:41 minutes of an instrumental version of "...Til the Cops Come Knockin'".

== Release and promotion ==
After Maxwell's Urban Hang Suite was completed, the finished recordings were presented to Columbia Records in mid 1995. It was shelved for nearly a year, because of issues with Columbia's management, the label's extensive reorganization, and record executives' doubts regarding the album's commercial potential. The marketplace dominance of hip hop soul in 1995 was in contrast with Maxwell's monogamous themes and older soul influences, which Columbia worried would be interpreted as old-fashioned. The label's executives also feared that his romantic concept and image would not appeal to listeners. Maxwell made matters worse by refusing to allow his picture to be placed on the album's front cover; instead he preferred to have the track listing and other information he felt was more important about the album in place of his photo. Regarding the cover, Maxwell later said "I wanted people to have the facts: the title, the selections and the fact that you had to basically buy it. I wanted people to come to the music and not base any opinion on the image". Columbia reached a compromise with Maxwell and used a promotional shot of him as the back cover. The album's front cover art also features a picture of a pair of golden women's shoes on the floor of a hotel room, with the bar coding prominently displayed.

In the period before its release, Maxwell wrote and demoed songs for a subsequent studio album, and embarked on an African American college tour with Groove Theory and the Fugees. The album was eventually released on April 2, 1996, and was a slow performer commercially. On April 20, it made its chart debut at number 38 on the Top R&B/Hip-Hop Albums in the United States. The gold-certified single "Ascension (Don't Ever Wonder)", which had shipped 500,000 copies in the US by October, was considered by music journalists to be a significant factor in consumers' increased interest in the album. On September 17, Maxwell's Urban Hang Suite was certified gold by the Recording Industry Association of America (RIAA). By 1997, the album had shipped one million copies, earning platinum status from the RIAA. It spent seventy-eight weeks on the Billboard 200 albums chart, while becoming a Top 30 chart hit in the United Kingdom. In 2002, it was certified double platinum, and by 2008, it stood as Maxwell's best-selling album, having sold 1,790,000 copies, according to Nielsen SoundScan.

== Critical reception ==
Professional ratings
Review scores
Source	Rating
AllMusic	5/5 stars
Chicago Tribune	3/4 stars
Robert Christgau	(dud)
The Encyclopedia of Popular Music	5/5 stars
Entertainment Weekly	B+
The Guardian	5/5 stars
Los Angeles Times	4/4 stars
MusicHound R&B	4/5 stars
Pitchfork	9.0/10
Q	3/5 stars
The Rolling Stone Album Guide	3/5 stars

Maxwell's Urban Hang Suite received positive reviews from critics. It was called a "masterpiece" by several reviewers who viewed it as a departure from the mainstream, hip hop-oriented R&B of the time. Maxwell was also compared to soul singers of the 1960s and 1970s.

Writing for Vibe, OJ Lima said the record was a "refreshing detour from hump-bouncin' '90s R&B", while Dimitri Ehrlich from Entertainment Weekly wrote that Maxwell "smooths hip-hop's and soul's edges, proving that black dance music doesn't automatically mean ghetto culture." Jim Farber of the New York Daily News called it "one of the few modern sex albums to offer a sense of succor", and Urban Latino hailed it as "one of the most soulful releases of the year", writing that Maxwell exhibited "the soul of Curtis Mayfield, the poetics of Beni More and the stage presence of Michael Jackson, pre-Thriller". In American Visions, Michael George wrote, "In an age where young, black artists are criticized (often rightly so) for misogynistic lyrics, Maxwell's focus on commitment is refreshing. But more important, he can flat-out sing." In The Rolling Stone Album Guide (2004), Arion Berger later said, "[Maxwell's] laid-back romanticism has heat at its core and a powerful groove that grounds the music: By varying the push of the beat but retaining the central mellow vibe, Maxwell creates a sound as felicitous on headphones as it is in the bedroom." Peter Shapiro was more critical, panning Maxwell's lyrics and calling the album an "overly mannered pastiche of early 70s soul ... all style and no substance". In The Village Voice, Robert Christgau jokingly accused Maxwell of "expiring of Afrocentric texturitis", while rating the album a "dud", which indicated "a bad record whose details rarely merit further thought".

At the end of 1996, Maxwell's Urban Hang Suite named one of the year's 10 best albums in lists published by Rolling Stone, Time, and USA Today. It was named the 20th best album of 1996 in the Pazz and Jop, an annual poll of American critics nationwide, published by The Village Voice. For the record, Maxwell was nominated for the 1997 Grammy Award for Best R&B Album, received three NAACP Image Award nominations, and wins in the categories of Best Male R&B/Soul Album and Best Male R&B/Soul Single (for "Ascension"), as well as Best R&B/Soul or Rap New Artist, for the 1997 Soul Train Awards. That year, Rolling Stone voted him Best R&B Artist. The album's success also earned Maxwell his own MTV Unplugged special, which was a popular measure of mainstream success for recording artists in the 1990s. Nick Coleman from The Independent later cited Maxwell's Urban Hang Suite as the "sexiest record of 1996", while Q magazine called it "one of the very best R&B records of the '90s." Stylus Magazine ranked it at number six on their list of the Top Ten Albums from 1996. The album was also included in the book 1001 Albums You Must Hear Before You Die.

== Legacy ==
Maxwell's Urban Hang Suite heralded the arrival of a top-of-the-class graduate of the old school of soul, one who could sing about romantic aspiration and tribulation with heart-wrenching emotion. It was as if the aesthetic that [Marvin] Gaye ascribed to -- 'music that has feeling, hope and meaning -- all the things people are looking for' -- had been rediscovered after a long, hedonistic interlude.

— The Washington Post, 1997

Along with musicians D'Angelo and Erykah Badu, Maxwell was credited with helping to shape the "neo soul" movement that rose to prominence during the late 1990s. Along with D'Angelo's Brown Sugar (1995) and Badu's Baduizm (1997), Urban Hang Suite has been recognized by writers for beginning neo soul's popularity and helping the genre obtain commercial visibility. However, in contrast to D'Angelo, Maxwell was more conventional in his approach on his debut album. The term "neo soul" was penned in the late 1990s by record executive Kedar Massenburg, who managed both D'Angelo and Erykah Badu. According to Shapiro, the term itself refers to a musical style that obtains its influence from more classical styles, and bohemian musicians seeking a soul revival, while setting themselves apart from the more contemporary sounds of their mainstream R&B counterparts. In commenting on the "new soul revival" in music, Maxwell told Entertainment Weekly in 1997 that "everything out there musically was inspired or influenced by something from the past. It's not about creating some super-fresh new thing. If it doesn't lend itself to your history, how is it going to extend to your future?" According to Kerika Fields, Maxwell received an overwhelmingly positive reaction to his debut album from music listeners due to their weariness of contemporary black music's predictability.

Maxwell's role in writing and producing the album exhibited a level of artistic control by an R&B artist that was uncommon in the recording industry at the time. On Maxwell's emergence with Urban Hang Suite, writer Carol Brennan cited him, along with the Fugees, D'Angelo and Tony Rich, as neo soul musicians that "exhibited the identifying characteristics of this new breed of R&B artists: lyrics that give voice to intense personal expression, creative control over the music, and a unexpectedly successful debut." In his book A Change Is Gonna Come: Music, Race & the Soul of America (2006), Craig Hansen Werner lists Maxwell's Urban Hang Suite as important in neo soul, including it along with R. Kelly's R. (1998), D'Angelo's Voodoo (2000), the Young Disciples' Road to Freedom (1991), Aaliyah's self-titled final release (2001), Faith Evans' Keep the Faith (1998) and "anything by Seal" as among "the starter kit" for the genre. In Songs in the Key of Black Life: A Rhythm and Blues Nation (2003), writer Mark Anthony Neal cited the album as one of the most popular of neo soul recordings, along with Musiq Soulchild's Aijuswanaseing (2000) and India.Arie's Acoustic Soul (2001), that helped to redefine the boundaries and contours of black pop and R&B.

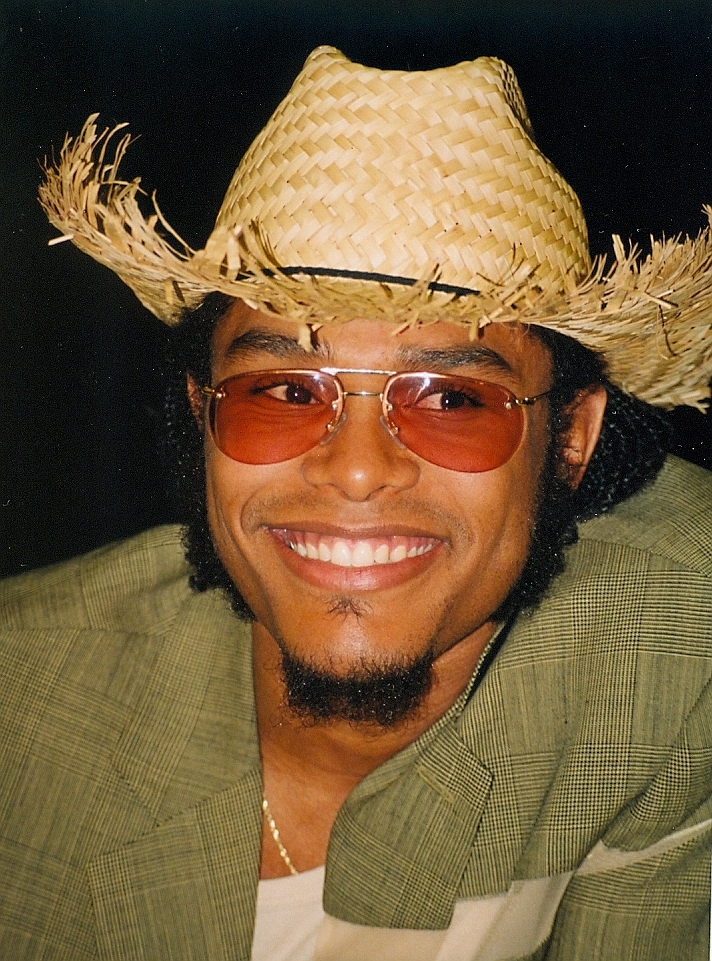
Maxwell in 1998

The unexpected commercial and critical success of Maxwell's Urban Hang Suite helped establish Maxwell as a serious performer in the music industry. He was described by critics as "part of a new generation of smooth soul crooners", and he obtained a reputation among fans as a sex symbol, which according to one journalist, was due to his "wild" afro and "extravagant cheekbones". His concert performances in promotion of the album attracted many female fans. One sold-out concert at New York City's Radio City Music Hall was praised by Rolling Stone, who compared him to R&B singers such as Gaye, Prince, Frankie Beverly, and Luther Vandross. The magazine highlighted Maxwell's showmanship, "down-to-earth" attitude and body movements including dropping down to his knees, swiveling his hips in a "slow grind", and crawling across the stage while singing. Essence writer Jeannine Amber compared his stage presence to Teddy Pendergrass. According to some journalists, Maxwell's appeal to female fans was due to the respectful and sincere nature of his lyrics regarding women. In Contemporary Musician (1998), Mary Alice Adams examined the personal impact of his debut album on listeners:

To his fans, Maxwell's Urban Hang Suite lures them into the heart of a romantic encounter that ends with a marriage proposal. The honest, sincere sexuality has struck a collective nerve with many in his audience who have built, renewed, or refined relationships based on the many messages found in the songs from Urban Hang Suite ... Maxwell's emotive power seduced not only significant numbers of both the urban and pop audiences but critics as well.

Maxwell's following studio albums were received less enthusiastically by critics, who were more critical of his songwriting on his next two studio albums, Embrya (1998) and Now (2001). Maxwell's Urban Hang Suite has since been cited by several critics as his best album, including Stephen Cook from AllMusic, who said it was "destined to become a classic contemporary R&B disc".

== Track listing ==
No.	Title	Writer(s)	Producer(s)	Length
1.	"The Urban Theme"	Maxwell	Maxwell	2:42
2.	"Welcome"	Maxwell, Stuart Matthewman	Maxwell, Stuart Matthewman	5:18
3.	"Sumthin' Sumthin'"	Maxwell, Leon Ware	Maxwell	4:18
4.	"Ascension (Don't Ever Wonder)"	Maxwell, Itaal Shur	Maxwell	5:46
5.	"Dancewitme"	Maxwell, Hod David	Maxwell	6:15
6.	"...Til the Cops Come Knockin'"	Maxwell, David	Maxwell, Peter Mokran	6:56
7.	"Whenever Wherever Whatever"	Maxwell, Matthewman	Maxwell, Matthewman	3:45
8.	"Lonely's the Only Company (I & II)"	Maxwell, Matthewman	Maxwell, Matthewman	6:22
9.	"Reunion"	Maxwell	Maxwell, Mokran	4:53
10.	"Suitelady (The Proposal Jam)"	Maxwell, David	Maxwell, Mokran	4:48
11.	"The Suite Theme" (ends at 6:00; hidden track at 12:06)	Maxwell	Maxwell, Federico Pena	13:47
Total length:				64:47

== Personnel ==
Credits for Maxwell's Urban Hang Suite adapted from liner notes.

Players

Guitars: Wah Wah Watson, Stuart Matthewman, H, Maxwell
Keyboards: Amp Fiddler, Federico Pena, Itaal Shur, David Gamson, Stuart Matthewman, Maxwell
Bass: Mike Neal, Gary Foote, Jonathan Maron, Stuart Matthewman
Drums/Beatmachine: Gene Lake, Stuart Matthewman, Itaal Shur, Peter Mokran, David Gamson, Maxwell
Percussion: Bashiri Johnson, Karl Vanden Bossche, Gregory Marsh
Horns: The Beverly Soul Sextion
Saxophone: Stuart Matthewman
Trombone: Clark Gayton
Trumpet: Kevin Batchelor
French horn: Vincent Chauncey
Cello: Erik Friedlander, Rufus Cappadocia
Voices: Maxwell

	Maxwell's Urban Hang Suite	Produced or co-produced by Maxwell with Stuart Matthewman or Peter Mokran; Additional production assistance: H (Mike Humphries), Wah Wah Watson (Melvin Ragin) and Itaal Shur; Written by Maxwell or co-written with Hod David, Stuart Matthewman, Leon Ware, Itaal Shur or Melvin Ragin; Recorded at Electric Lady (NYC), RPM (NYC), CRC (Chicago), Chung King (NYC), Sorcercer (NYC); Engineers: Mike Pela, Peter Mokran and Ed Tuton; Assistant engineers: Michael Nuceder, Jamie Campbell, Brian "Mr. Bones" Kinkead, Phil Castellano, John Seymour and Ron Lowe; Mastered by Tom Coyne at Sterling Sound (NYC); Art direction: Stacey Drummond and Julian Peploe; Photography: Eric Johnson; Photo assistance: Michael Stryder and Jamel; A&R direction: Mitchell Cohen
#	Title	Notes
1	"The Urban Theme"	Arranged and produced by MUZSE; Mixed by Peter Mokran
2	"Welcome"	Written by MUSZE, Stuart Matthewman and Sade Adu Produced by Maxwell and Stuart Matthewman; Mixed by Mike Pela
3	"Sumthin' Sumthin'"	Written by Maxwell and Leon Ware; Produced by Maxwell; Mixed by Mike Pela
4	"Ascension (Don't Ever Wonder)"	Written by Maxwell and Itaal Shir; Produced by Maxwell; Mixed by Mike Pela
5	"Dancewitme"	Written by Maxwell and Hod David; Produced by Maxwell; Mixed by Mike Pela
6	"...Til the Cops Come Knockin'"	Written by Maxwell and Hod David; Produced by Maxwell and Peter Mokran; Mixed by Peter Mokran
7	"Whenever Wherever Whatever"	Written by MUSZE, Stuart Matthewman and Sade Adu Produced by Maxwell and Stuart Matthewman; Mixed by Mike Pela
8	"Lonely's the Only Company (I & II)"	Written by MUSZE, Stuart Matthewman and Sade Adu Produced by Maxwell and Stuart Matthewman; Mixed by Mike Pela
9	"Reunion"	Written by Maxwell; Produced by Maxwell and Peter Mokran; Mixed by Peter Mokran
10	"Suitelady (The Proposal Jam)"	Written by Maxwell and Hod David; Produced by Maxwell and Peter Mokran; Mixed by Peter Mokran
11	"The Suite Theme"	Produced by Maxwell; Arranged by Maxwell and Federico Pena; Mixed by Peter Mokran

== Charts ==
=== Weekly charts ===
Chart (1996–1997)	Peak position
Australian Albums (ARIA)	100
Dutch Albums (Album Top 100)	52
French Albums (SNEP)	33
New Zealand Albums (RMNZ)	33
Swedish Albums (Sverigetopplistan)	46
UK Albums (Official Charts)	39
UK R&B Albums (Official Charts)	8
US Billboard 200	37
US Top R&B/Hip-Hop Albums (Billboard)	8

=== Year-end charts ===
Chart (1996)	Position
US Billboard 200	151
US Top R&B/Hip-Hop Albums (Billboard)	22

Chart (1997)	Position
US Billboard 200	94
US Top R&B/Hip-Hop Albums (Billboard)	22

== Certifications ==
Region	Certification	Certified units/sales
United Kingdom (BPI)	Gold	100,000^{^}
United States (RIAA)	2× Platinum	2,000,000^{^}
^{^} Shipments figures based on certification alone.

== Bibliography ==
- Craig Hansen Werner (2006). A Change Is Gonna Come: Music, Race & the Soul of America. University of Michigan Press. ISBN 0-472-03147-3.
- Mellonee Victoria Burnim, Portia K. Maultsby (2006). African American Music: An Introduction. Routledge. ISBN 0-415-94137-7.
- Carol Brennan, Gale Group (2002). Contemporary Black Biography: Profiles Form the International Black Community. Vol. 32. Gale Group. ISBN 0-7876-2417-9.
- Mary Alice Adams, Gale Group (1998). Contemporary Musicians. Vol. 21. Gale Research. ISBN 0-7876-1178-6.
- Chris Kringel (2004). Hal Leonard Funk Bass: A Guide to the Styles and Techniques of Funk Bass. Hal Leonard Corporation. ISBN 0-634-06710-9.
- Maxwell (1996). Maxwell's Urban Hang Suite. (CD liner notes). Columbia Records, 550 Madison Avenue, New York, NY 10022.
- Nathan Brackett, Christian Hoard, ed. (November 1, 2004). The New Rolling Stone Album Guide. Completely Revised and Updated 4th Edition. Simon & Schuster. ISBN 0-7432-0169-8.
- Alex Hahn (2003). Possessed: The Rise and Fall of Prince. Watson-Guptill. ISBN 0-8230-7748-9.
- Peter Shapiro, Al Spicer (2006). The Rough Guide to Soul and R&B. Rough Guides. ISBN 1-84353-264-6.
- Mark Anthony Neal (2003). Songs in the Key of Black Life: A Rhythm and Blues Nation. Routledge. ISBN 0-415-96571-3.
