= Love Jones (film) =

1997 film by Theodore Witcher

- Theatrical release poster
- Directed by: Theodore Witcher
- Written by: Theodore Witcher
- Produced by: Nick Wechsler; Jeremiah Samuels
- Starring: Larenz Tate; Nia Long; Isaiah Washington; Lisa Nicole Carson; Bill Bellamy
- Cinematography: Ernest Holzman
- Edited by: Maysie Hoy
- Music by: Darryl Jones
- Distributed by: New Line Cinema
- Release dates: January 17, 1997 (Sundance); March 14, 1997 (United States)
- Running time: 108 minutes
- Country: United States
- Language: English
- Budget: $7 million
- Box office: $12.7 million

Love Jones (stylized as love jones) is a 1997 American romantic comedy-drama film written and directed by Theodore Witcher, in his feature film directing debut. The film stars Larenz Tate, Nia Long, Isaiah Washington, Bill Bellamy, and Lisa Nicole Carson.

Love Jones had its world premiere at the Sundance Film Festival on January 17, 1997, where it tied with Hurricane Street for the Audience Award. It was released in the United States on March 14, 1997, by New Line Cinema. Although the film received favorable critical reviews, it was not a financial success. It is Theodore Witcher's only directorial work to date.

== Plot ==
In Chicago, Darius Lovehall, a writer and poet, meets photographer Nina Mosley at the Sanctuary, a nightclub where jazz and spoken-word are performed. After an awkward first meeting at the bar, Darius is called to the stage and performs a poem that he dedicates to Nina. The two are attracted to each other, but Nina is hesitant because she has recently ended an engagement with Marvin. Darius sees Nina again at the record store and asks her out. After she declines, he obtains her address through her friend Sheila and later arrives at her apartment with a compact disc she had been searching for. Nina eventually agrees to spend time with him, and the two begin a romantic relationship, Although they become close, both avoid clearly expressing what they want from each other. Nina remains uncertain about her unresolved feelings for Marvin, while Darius is reluctant to admit the depth of his feelings for her.

Their relationship becomes strained when Marvin asks Nina to come to New York to discuss their future. Nina tells Darius that she has unfinished business with Marvin and leaves Chicago. Darius is hurt by he decision and later becomes involved with another women. When Nina returns and learns about it, she distances herself from him and begins spending time with Hollywood, one of Darius's friend. This leads to tension between Darius and Hollywood, later Darius and Nina briefly reconcile. Despite their reconciliation, Darius and Nina continue to struggle with mistrust, pride, and poor communication. Nina eventually accepts an opportunity in New York and prepares to leave Chicago again.

Darius realizes that he wants to be with her and tries to reach her before she departs, but he arrives at Union Station too late and misses her train. After time apart, Nina returns to Chicago and sees Darius again. The two acknowledge that their feelings for each other remain unresolved. Darius tells Nina that he still loves her, and the film ends with them considering whether to continue their relationship despite the distance between Chicago and New York.

== Cast ==
- Larenz Tate as Darius Lovehall
- Nia Long as Nina Mosley
- Isaiah Washington as Savon Garrison
- Lisa Nicole Carson as Josie Nichols
- Bill Bellamy as Hollywood
- Leonard Roberts as Eddie Coles
- Bernadette Speakes as Sheila Downes (as Bernadette L. Clarke)
- Khalil Kain as Marvin Cox

== Production ==
The producers of Love Jones stated that they wanted to make a modern film about Black American life that did not use violence and recreational drugs as elements in the story. Witcher developed the film from his interest in Chicago's underground poetry scene. In a 2017 oral history, he said that a Chicago poetry club called Spices provided the setting that he used as the background for a story about a relationship between twentysomethings. With encouragement from New Line executive Helena Echegoyen, Witcher wrote the screenplay over about nine months.

Two of the poems recited by Nia Long's character, Nina, were written by Sonia Sanchez and are included in her book Like the Singing Coming Off the Drums: Love Poems.

The film was shot in Chicago. According to the Los Angeles Times, cold weather and persistent rain affected the production, and rain was incorporated into the film's visual style and story.

== Soundtrack ==
The soundtrack included songs by artists such as Maxwell, Lauryn Hill, Groove Theory, and Cassandra Wilson. A 2022 essay published by the Criterion Collection stated that the soundtrack's reception helped renew interest in the film after its initial theatrical underperformance.

== Reception ==
On Rotten Tomatoes, the film holds a 76% approval rating based on reviews from 29 critics, with an average rating of 6.7/10. The consensus summarizes: "An endearing romance that puts a fairly fresh perspective on familiar framework, Love Jones is worth falling for." On Metacritic it has a score of 65% based on reviews from 22 critics. Audiences surveyed by CinemaScore gave the film a grade "A" on scale of A to F.

Roger Ebert gave the film a score of three out of four stars, and expressed the view that "There is also a bow to the unconventional in the ending of his film. Many love stories contrive to get their characters together at the end. This one contrives, not to keep them apart, but to bring them to a bittersweet awareness that is above simple love. Some audience members would probably prefer a romantic embrace in the sunset, as the music swells. But Love Jones is too smart for that." He also noted on the acting: "It's hard to believe that Tate--so smooth, literate and attractive here--played the savage killer O-Dog in Menace II Society. Nia Long was Brandi, one of the girl friends, in Boyz n the Hood. Love Jones extends their range, to put it mildly".

James Berardinelli, writing for ReelReviews, also awarded the film three out of four stars, writing that "There are several reasons why this film works better than the common, garden-variety love story. To begin with, the setting and texture are much different than that of most mainstream romances. The culture, in which post-college African Americans mingle while pursuing careers and relationships, represents a significant change from what we're used to. The Sanctuary, the intimate Chicago nightclub where Darius and Nina meet, is rich in its eclectic, bluesy atmosphere. And Love Jones's dialogue is rarely trite. When the characters open their mouths, it usually is because they have something intelligent to say, not because they're trying to fill up dead air with meaningless words".

== Home media ==
The film was released on VHS by New Line Home Entertainment. It later received a standalone DVD release, as well as a New Line "double feature" DVD release, the latter of which also included the 1996 film A Thin Line Between Love and Hate.

A 4K restoration of the film was released on Blu-ray by the Criterion Collection on March 29, 2022.

The Criterion Collection released a director-approved Blu-ray edition on March 29, 2022. The release included a new 4K digital restoration supervised by Theodore Witcher, a 5.1 surround DTS-HD Master Audio soundtrack, an audio commentary by Witcher new interviews, a panel discussion with members of the cast and crew, and an essay by Danielle Amir Jackson.

== Legacy ==
In a 2017 oral history, the Los Angeles Times described Love Jones as part of a group of late- 1990s and early-2000s films, including Soul Food, The Wood, and Brown Sugar, that broadened screen depiction of Black life, love, and relationships.

In 2025, the American Black Film Festival announced that Nia Long and Larenz Tate would serve as ambassadors for that year's festival and participate in "ABFF Remembers: Love Jones," s conversation and musical tribute focused on the film.
