= Wasted Energy =

"Wasted Energy" (Remix)

Single by Alicia Keys featuring Kaash Paige and Diamond Platnumz

from the album Alicia (Digital edition)
- Released: December 17, 2020
- Studio: Jungle City (New York, NY); Oven (New York, NY); Record Plant (Los Angeles, CA)
- Length: 4:38
- Label: RCA
- Songwriters: Keys; Richard Isong; Ariowa Irosogie; Nathaniel Warner; Kali McLoughlin
- Producer: P2J

Alicia Keys singles chronology
"A Beautiful Noise" (2020)	"Wasted Energy" (Remix) (2020)	"Lala" (2021)

"Wasted Energy" is a song by American singer and songwriter Alicia Keys featuring Tanzanian recording artist Diamond Platnumz. It was written by Keys, Richard Isong, Ariowa Irosogie, Nathaniel Warner, Kali McLoughlin and produced by P2J, and released on Keys' seventh studio album Alicia (2020). A remixed version of the song featuring American singer and songwriter Kaash Paige was released as a single from the digital reissue of the album on December 17, 2020.

== Background ==
"Wasted Energy" was released on Keys' seventh studio album Alicia on September 18, 2020. Following the song's release, Keys received criticism from Diamond Platnumz's fans, who complained that his verse for too short. Diamond Platnumz responded to the criticism by alluding that there is another version of the song, featuring a longer verse. In an interview with Grammy.com, Diamond Platnumz commented on the collaboration:

That came from Swizz Beatz. He's been supporting me since way back. When I came to L.A. this year [before the coronavirus] to perform, he called me and said come to the studio. When I got to the studio, I found Alicia Keys recording our song. Swizz was like, "You have to jump on this and do a verse." I was shocked they preferred me to be on the song. Alicia was working on her album, so I said, "Right now? Where's my part?" She said she wanted me to give her 100 percent bongo flava, so that's where that came from.

Keys commented that "I also love that Diamond Platnumz was part of this" who according to Keys "bless[ed] this track with his unique style" On December 18, Keys released a bonus tracks edition of the album, with "Wasted Energy" remix being one of the new songs. On Twitter, Keys posted a picture of her and Kaash Paige in the studio with the caption "cooked up some magic on the remix". The remix features an extended verse from Diamomnd Platnumz.

== Composition ==
"Wasted Energy" in an R&B song that samples Red Rat's dancehall song "Tight Up Skirts" and features "dub reggae stylings". Diamond Platnumz sings his verse in his native Swahili language. The song was described as featuring "dub guitar flips", "samba snaps" and "sampled squeals". Adi Mehta from Entertainment Voice noted the "Medúlla-era Björk" sounding "haunting, fanciful vocal harmonies" in the beginning of the song.

The song contains explicit lyrics. On the song, Keys sings "Too many times you turn a blind eye to how I feel". OkayAfrica wrote that the song speaks of a "relationship with someone who intentionally ignores their needs and desires". According to Antwane Folk from Rated R&B, Keys "airs out frustrations for an inattentive lover" on the song. According to A.D. Amorosi from Variety, the song "tell[s] a tale of being ignored and unloved". Shakeena Johnson from Clash compared the song to "Ghetto Story" (2006) by Cham, on which Keys is featured.

== Critical reception ==
"Wasted Energy" was generally well received by music critics in their reviews for Alicia. According to Nick Levine from NME, the song is "dewy reggae" while David Smyth from Evening Standard called it "throbbing reggae". Sal Cinquemani from Slant named it one of the most interesting collaborations on the album, writing that "the dub-infused" song "inspires in Keys a blissed-out vocal performance reminiscent of Sade". Joe Muggs from The Arts Desk wrote that "Keys's vocal is sultry throughout" the "weighty dub reggae" song while Fiona Shepherd from The Scotsman commented that "Diamond Platnumz matches Keys’ aching vocals" on the song. Adi Mehta from Entertainment Voice noted Diamond Platnumz's "unique verse" and complimented the personality he brings to the song. In their ranking of the best R&B albums of 2020, Rated R&B wrote that the song is "an absolute highlight in striking a balance between lovers rock and Afrobeat. Konstantinos Pappis from Our Culture Mag wrote that the song “lacks any sense of momentum” and named it one of the album’s “weakest spots”.

== Live performances ==
Keys performed the song during iHeartRadio Album Release Party for her album Keys (2021) airing on December 9, 2021 Keys also performed the song during concert at Expo 2020 in Dubal, United Arab Emirates on December 10, 2021. The song is performed as part of Alicia + Keys World Tour immediately following You Don't Know My Name.

== Track listing ==
- Digital download
1. "Wasted Energy" (featuring Diamond Platnumz) – 4:19
- Digital download
1. "Wasted Energy (Remix) (featuring Kaash Paige & Diamond Platnumz) – 4:37

== Release history ==
Region	Date	Format	Label	Ref.
France	December 18, 2020	Digital download	RCA	
United States	December 17, 2020	Digital download	RCA	
