= Keys to the Summer Tour =

2023 concert tour by Alicia Keys

- Continental tour by Alicia Keys
- Tour poster
- Location: North America
- Start date: June 28, 2023
- End date: August 2, 2023
- Legs: 1
- No. of shows: 22

Alicia Keys concert chronology
- Alicia + Keys World Tour (2022–2023); Keys to the Summer Tour (2023)

Keys to the Summer Tour was the seventh concert tour by American singer and songwriter Alicia Keys. The tour started on June 28, 2023, at the FLA Live Arena in Sunrise, FL, and concluded on August 2, 2023, at the Kia Forum in Inglewood, CA, United States.

== Background ==
Keys announced the tour and unveiled the tour dates on April 18, 2023. The tour will present Keys in a 360-degree production stage, allowing "fans to experience her live performance in an entirely new and exhilarating way". Keys stated that "This is my first time creating a 360 experience and we’ve made sure it’s like nothing you’ve ever seen! Pre-sale for the tour took place from April 18 to April 20 and the general sale began on April 21, 2023. The tour's setlist included "deep cuts" as well as well known songs from Songs in A Minor (2001), The Diary of Alicia Keys (2003), As I Am (2007) and The Element of Freedom (2009).

== Critical reception ==
In his review of the concert at Spectrum Center in Charlotte, Théoden Janes from The Charlotte Observer wrote that Keys "gave a positively massive performance that pulled no punches as it sailed boldly through her stunning catalog of R&B-, hip-hop- and pop-inflected tracks", adding that from midpoint onwards came "the most powerful portions of the show" culminating in a "goosebump-inducing" rendition of "If I Ain't Got You". Reviewing Keys' concert at the State Farm Arena in Atlanta, Olivia Wakim from The Atlanta Journal-Constitution commented that "One of the most immersive aspects of the show were the light displays and visuals" but concluded that "Keys’ vocal and musical talents were the star of the show. The moments where her voice was on full display topped even the most impressive display of lights. Maura Johnston from The Boston Globe, wrote that "Keys whirled through her discography and a few well-chosen covers during a triumphant set for both performer and audience" and according to her, the concert was "all about reveling in human connection". Jane Stevenson from the Toronto Sun rated the concert Scotiabank Arena four out of four stars and commented that Keys has evolved into a "top-notch and blessedly natural performer" while Nick Krewen from Toronto Star rated the same show three stars, commenting that Keys was "immaculate in her performance". Malcolm Abraham from Cleveland.com wrote that Keys "made sure to hang out, dance and show love to fans" throughout the concert and described Keys's vocals as "impassioned and strong".

Brian McCollum from Detroit Free Press commented that Keys' concert at Little Ceasars Palace was "at turns elegant and empowering, intimate and anthemic" and where "the lighting was dazzling, the onscreen visuals sharp and lively", concluded in his review that "despite all the production trimmings, the show maintained a close-knit feel". Britt Julious from the Chicago Tribune wrote that the "songs blended seamlessly into one another, threading a connection between genre (soul and pop) and the phases of Keys’ career" while the round stage "makes for a lovely viewing experience" and mentioned that "perhaps most interesting about her live performances is how she is able to represent the dual sides of her career and her sound". In his review of the Louisville concert, J. Tyler Franklin from Louisville Public Media complimented the concert's song selection and stage design and concluded that "the charisma, talent and showmanship on display at the Keys to the Summer Tour is enough to silence any critic". Steve Leftridge from Riverfront Times commented that Keys' voice at Enterprise Center was "resplendent all night" and added that the concert was "as defined by intimate gestures, songful recitations and intimate connections with the audience as by musical combustion, vocal infernos and stagecraft conflagrations". Of Keys' concert at Austin’s Moody Center, Deborh Sengupta Stith from Austin American-Statesman said that "Keys performs with pure emotion". She praised Keys' performance, writing that Keys "came to slay" and offered a "musical odyssey marked by jaw-dropping technical prowess, exultant sing-alongs and a joyous celebration of love in all its many forms".

== Opening acts ==
- Libianca
- Simi

== Set list ==
This set list is representative of the concert in Tampa on June 30, 2023. It does not represent all concerts for the tour.

1. "Fallin'"
2. "New Day"
3. "Love Looks Better"
4. "Limitedless"
5. "You Don't Know My Name"
6. "Teenage Love Affair"
7. "Karma"
8. "Try Sleeping With A Broken Heart"
9. "Un-Thinkable (I'm Ready)"
10. "Underdog"
11. "Blended Family (What You Do For Love)"
12. "Holy War"
13. "Come for Me"
14. "My Boo"
15. "City of Gods (Part II)"
16. "How Come U Don't Call Me"
17. "The Thing About Love"
18. "A Woman's Worth"
19. "Superwoman"
20. "Not Even The King"
21. "Butterflyz"
22. "That's How Strong My Love Is"
23. "Diary"
24. "Like You'll Never See Me Again"
25. "I Need You"
26. "The Gospel"
27. "Where Do We Go from Here"
28. "Girl on Fire"
29. "Empire State of Mind"
30. "Sweet Dreams (Are Made of This)"
31. "In Common"
32. "No One"
  Encore
33. "If I Ain't Got You"

Notes

- In Detroit, Keys performed "Lesson Learned".

== Tour dates ==
List of concerts
Date	City	Country	Venue	Attendance	Revenue
June 28, 2023	Sunrise	United States	FLA Live Arena	—	—
June 30, 2023	Tampa	United States	Amalie Arena	—	—
July 2, 2023	Charlotte	United States	Spectrum Center	—	—
July 3, 2023	Atlanta	United States	State Farm Arena	7,856 (92,76%)	$527,995
July 5, 2023	Memphis	United States	FedExForum	—	—
July 7, 2023	Washington, D.C.	United States	Capital One Arena	7,977 (79,43%)	$823,630
July 9, 2023	Boston	United States	TD Garden	8,597 (85,36%)	$852,160
July 10, 2023	Philadelphia	United States	Wells Fargo Center	—	—
July 12, 2023	New York City	United States	Barclays Center	—	—
July 14, 2023	Toronto	Canada	Scotiabank Arena	—	—
July 15, 2023	Cleveland	United States	Rocket Mortgage FieldHouse	—	—
July 17, 2023	Detroit	United States	Little Caesars Arena	—	—
July 18, 2023	Chicago	United States	United Center	—	—
July 20, 2023	Louisville	United States	KFC Yum! Center	—	—
July 21, 2023	St. Louis	United States	Enterprise Center	—	—
July 23, 2023	New Orleans	United States	Smoothie King Center	—	—
July 24, 2023	Austin	United States	Moody Center	—	—
July 27, 2023	Denver	United States	Ball Arena	—	—
July 28, 2023	West Valley City	United States	Maverik Center	—	—
July 30, 2023	Seattle	United States	Climate Pledge Arena	—	—
August 1, 2023	Oakland	United States	Oakland Arena	—	—
August 2, 2023	Inglewood	United States	Kia Forum	—	—
Total				24,430	$2,203,785

== Accolades ==
Organization	Year	Award	Recipient(s)	Result	Ref.
Pollstar Awards	2024	R&B Tour of the Year	Keys to the Summer Tour	Nominated	
