= Perfect Way to Die =

2020 song by Alicia Keys

Single by Alicia Keys

from the album Alicia
- Released: June 19, 2020
- Studio: Jungle City Studios (New York, NY); Record Plant (Los Angeles, CA)
- Length: 3:31
- Label: RCA
- Songwriters: Alicia Keys; Sebastian Kole
- Producers: Alicia Keys; Sebastian Kole

Alicia Keys singles chronology
"Good Job" (2020)	"Perfect Way to Die" (2020)	"So Done" (2020)

Music video
- "Perfect Way To Die" on YouTube

"Perfect Way to Die" is a song by American singer-songwriter Alicia Keys. It was written and produced by Keys and Sebastian Kole. The song was released on July 19, 2020, through RCA Records as the fifth single from Keys' seventh studio album Alicia (2020).

"Perfect Way to Die" is a piano ballad about police brutality and racism, and was inspired by the deaths of Mike Brown and Sandra Bland. The music video was directed by Chris Robinson, and was premiered at the BET Awards held in June 2020.

== Background ==
Keys appeared on the Daily Show with Trevor Noah on June 15, 2020, to talk about the song and the killings of Mike Brown and Sandra Bland, where she stated that "you hear their stories in these lyrics and the devastating thing is that it's never not going to be relevant". Keys officially announced the song on Twitter on June 19, 2020, posting the cover art, and a message explaining the inspiration and meaning of the song. The songs release coincided with Juneteenth and amid weeks of civil unrest across the United States in response to police brutality against African Americans. While posting the single on her Twitter account, Keys commented on its relevancy and condemned "the destructive culture of police violence" as senseless as the song's titular phrase. "Sometimes I don't have the words and music is the only thing that can speak", she went on to say.⁣ "I hope this speaks to you."

In an interview with British Vogue, Keys stated that the song is "a musical expression of what we’re seeing every day, this police brutality that is completely out of hand". Keys has stated that the song wasn't going to be on the Alicia album, but decided to include the song on the album "when all that started happening with Breonna [Taylor], and Ahmaud [Arbery], and George".

== Composition and lyrics ==
The song is written in the key of F♭ major with a 12/8 time signature and a tempo of 86 beats per minute. In the song, Keys discusses killings at the hands of the police, singing about a mother who receives "a call from the coroner" about her son that has been "gunned down". Keys sings about "another king and queen lost", which according to Althea Legaspi of Rolling Stone are references to the deaths of Michael Brown and Sandra Bland.

As noted by Sal Cinquemani from Slant, the "spare arrangements of piano and vocal" on the song are "functionally effective at highlighting the lyrical content". Variety described the song as having "chamber pop vibe" and a "light chorus". According to BBC, "Perfect Way to Die" is a protest song inspired by the aftermath of the murder of George Floyd. Joe Muggs of The Arts Desk stated that the song contains "fearsomely direct lyrics on police violence, street life and protest" while Nick Smith from musicOMH noted its "desolate sense of despair". Atwood Magazine's Josh Weiner said that the song's lyrics contain "startling imagery of urban protests" while described the song being a "gentle keyboard number".

== Music video ==
The video is a tribute to people who lost their lives at the hand of police. The video was directed by Chris Robinson and premiered at the 2020 BET Awards. In the video, Keys sits behind a piano on an empty street and sings the song while images of victims were displayed on buildings. At the end of the video Keys stands up and the street is covered in the names of people who lost their lives due to police brutality, including Aiyana Stanley-Jones, Renisha McBride, Korryn Gaines, Reno Owens, Dante Parker, Jack Lamar Roberson Jr., Darius Tarver and Ahmaud Arbery, among others. Keys released behind the scenes footage of making of the video on July 5, 2020.

== Critical reception ==
Konstantinos Pappis from Our Culture Mag singled out the song as one of the album's “most illuminating moments” and wrote that the song is a “somber, heart-wrenching piano ballad tackling police brutality and systemic racism” Vulture called the song "raw and heart-wrenching" while Entertainment Weekly called it "powerful" and "poignant". Mike Wass from Idolator noted that "All of the songs from the enduring hitmaker’s upcoming 7th LP have been immaculate, but this is extra special". In Rolling Stone, Jon Dolan wrote of the "powerfully sung" track that it "offers a Black Lives Matter protest ballad in vividly personal terms". In a negative review, Shamira Ibrahim of NPR wrote that "the lyrics, in isolation, technically speak towards the current moment gripping Black America", but concluded that the "end result falls flat".

== Live performances ==
Keys performed the song during her Verzuz battle with John Legend on June 19, 2020.

== Credits and personnel ==
Adapted from Alicia album liner notes.

- Produced by Alicia Keys and Sebastan Kole
- Piano by Alicia Keys
- Strings arranged and performed by Davide Rossi
- Engineered and mixed by Ann Mincieli at Jungle City Studios (NYC) and Record Plant (LA)
- Assistant engineer: Brendan Morawski

== Track listing ==
- Digital download
1. "Perfect Way to Die" – 3:31
