= Alicia (album) =

Studio album by Alicia Keys
- Released: September 18, 2020
- Recorded: c. 2015–2019 (Note: According to Keys' sound engineer and creative partner Ann Mincieli, the singer originally recorded the songs "Love Looks Better" and "3 Hour Drive" for her 2016 album Here; while the latter song was completed in 2015, the former underwent various re-recordings for Alicia. The album itself was reportedly being completed in May 2019.)
- Studios: Conway (Los Angeles); ELBO (Los Angeles); Record Plant (Los Angeles); Fieldwork (Los Angeles); Fieldwork (London, UK); Fieldwork (Nashville, Tennessee); Jungle City (New York City); Oven (New York City); RAK (New York City); Triangle Sound (Atlanta, Georgia)
- Genres: R&B; soul; orchestral pop
- Length: 54:40
- Label: RCA
- Producers: Sean C; Jonny Coffer; Larrance Dopson; Ludwig Göransson; Alicia Keys; Sebastian Kole; Morgan Matthews; Johnny McDaid; Jimmy Napes; P2J; Rob Knox; Sampha; Tricky Stewart; Khirye Tyler; Ryan Tedder; Noel Zancanella

Alicia Keys chronology
Here (2016)	Alicia (2020)	Keys (2021)

Singles from Alicia
- 1. "Show Me Love" Released: September 17, 2019; 2. "Time Machine" Released: November 20, 2019; 3. "Underdog" Released: January 9, 2020; 4. "Good Job" Released: April 23, 2020; 5. "Perfect Way to Die" Released: June 19, 2020; 6. "So Done" Released: August 14, 2020; 7. "Love Looks Better" Released: September 10, 2020

Alicia is the seventh studio album by American singer-songwriter and pianist Alicia Keys. It was primarily recorded at Oven Studios and Jungle City Studios, both in New York, after her 2016 album Here and her judgeship on the singing competition series The Voice, before being released by RCA Records on September 18, 2020. Written and produced largely by Keys, the album also features songwriting and production contributions from Swizz Beatz, Ryan Tedder, Johnny McDaid, Ed Sheeran, and the-Dream, among others. Keys collaborated with more artists on the recording than in her previous albums, enlisting vocalists such as Sampha, Tierra Whack, Diamond Platnumz, Snoh Aalegra, and Jill Scott for certain tracks.

Alicia's mostly low-tempo and melodically subtle music reconciles the experimental direction of Here with her earlier work's bass drum-driven R&B and piano-based balladry. Throughout, individual songs incorporate sounds from a wide range of other genres, including orchestral pop, progressive soul, funk, ambient, country, and Caribbean music. Thematically, they explore the concept of a multifaceted identity, sociopolitical concerns, and forms of love within the framework of impressionistic lyrics, personal narratives, and self-knowledge. Keys has described the album as therapeutic and reflective of greater introspection, and as expressing ideas and feelings of hope, frustration, despair, ambivalence, and equanimity shared in her memoir More Myself (2020), which was written during Alicia's recording.

The album was originally scheduled to be released on March 20, 2020, then May 15, before being delayed indefinitely in response to the COVID-19 pandemic. It was marketed with an extended traditional rollout campaign that featured various media appearances by Keys and the release of seven singles, including the Miguel duet "Show Me Love", "Time Machine", "Underdog", and "So Done" (with Khalid). After a surprise announcement of its impending release in September, Alicia debuted at number four on the Billboard 200 in its first week and became Keys' eighth top-10 record in the US, while charting in the top 10 in several other countries. However, it fell off the US chart a few weeks later.

A critical success, Alicia received praise for Keys' nuanced vocal performances and the music's broad appeal, while her thematic messages were considered balanced, healing, and timely against the backdrop of unfolding world events. The singles "Good Job" and "Perfect Way to Die" resonated especially with the importance of essential workers during the pandemic and with the 2020–2021 racial unrest over police brutality in the US, respectively. The album also won the Grammy Award for Best Immersive Audio Album at the 2022 Grammy Awards. In further support of the album, Keys performed in concert from June to November 2022 and in May 2023 on the Alicia + Keys World Tour, which had been postponed from 2020 and 2021 due to the pandemic.

== Background ==
In 2016, singer-songwriter Alicia Keys released her sixth studio album Here, a raw departure from the more sophisticated and anthemic R&B music of her first five albums. Sung with tougher vocals and against edgy sounds from hip hop, funk, and jazz, Keys' topical lyrics for the album explored themes beyond the uncertain romantic relationships that predominated her earlier music, such as sexuality, addiction, poverty, and environmental degradation. In another departure from her perfectionist inclinations, the singer stopped wearing makeup that year. After Here's release, she took a break from recording music and served as a coach on the singing competition series The Voice. She took a leave of absence from the show's 13th season in 2017 to focus on making Alicia.

== Recording and production ==
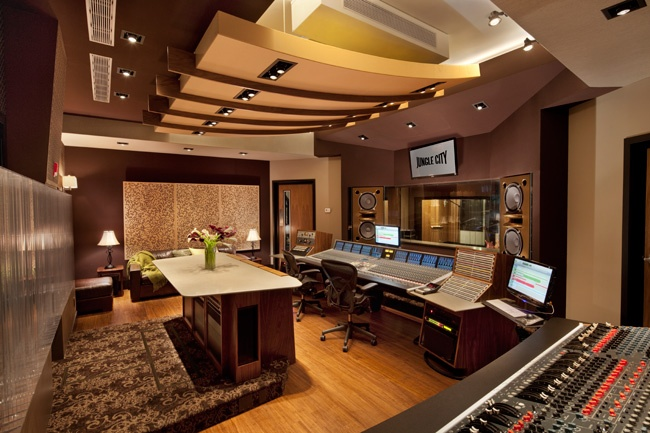
Jungle City Studios, where all but one of Alicia's songs were recorded

Keys reportedly returned to Oven Studios, her personal studio in New York City, to record Alicia. However, several other studios were later credited for its recording, including NYC's Jungle City Studios, where recording for 14 of the album's 15 tracks took place. The studio was founded by Ann Mincieli, Keys' longtime recording engineer and studio director who also engineered much of Alicia. The album was produced primarily by Keys, with alternating contributions from an assorted group of record producers and songwriters, including her husband Swizz Beatz, Ludwig Göransson, Ed Sheeran, Tory Lanez, and The-Dream.

For certain songs, Keys collaborated with guest vocalists such as Tierra Whack, Jill Scott, Miguel, Sampha, and Khalid. A few songs had been originally recorded for Here, including the Sampha duet "3 Hour Drive" (recorded in 2015) and "Love Looks Better", which underwent various unsuccessful takes with different producers before Keys revisited the song on her own with contributions from Ryan Tedder. "It was Alicia, in the end", as Mincieli recounts, "pulling few pieces from Ryan and added [sic] some things on her own for you to hear her lyrics, vocals, and emotions without all the scratches, scribbles, stutters, and production that was overtaking the song". By May 2017, the album had been almost "halfway" finished, according to Keys.

During Alicia's recording, Keys wrote her memoir More Myself: A Journey (2020), reflecting on her life and career up to that point. In its final chapter, she explained how the album's creative process encouraged more collaborations than in her earlier recordings, when she had preferred to work alone from fear of being misunderstood, controlled, and vulnerable as an artist. She continued writing the memoir into May 2019, by which time the album was being completed. The singer said that working on both projects served as "the best therapy" ever for her, lending her a greater sense of artistic freedom and desire to collaborate with others.

== Music ==
Alicia continues in the experimental manner of Here while revisiting the distinctive piano-based balladry and bass drum-driven R&B of Keys' earlier music. However, it avoids the emphatic hooks and motifs typical of her past. Instead, the album's "subtly melodic soul" experiments are embellished with ambient, electro, and textured sounds from music sequencers, according to A. D. Amorosi of Variety, who adds that Alicia is "still a singer and pianist's album" but one that renders Keys' instrument in new forms. The music throughout has largely subtle and downtempo dynamics, except for "Love Looks Better", which is produced in a loftier pop-soul style. According to The New York Times chief pop critic Jon Pareles, the music "often hollows itself out around her, opening deep bass chasms or surrounding sparse instrumentation with echoey voids".

"Authors of Forever"
A 20-second sample featuring sounds from smooth soul and dance-pop, among the wide range of stylistic elements featured on the album

The album's direction, which Keys describes as "genreless", is oriented toward evoking a particular mood rather than conforming to a singular genre. In the process, individual songs incorporate elements of particular styles, including progressive soul ("Truth Without Love"), old-fashioned funk ("Time Machine"), dance-pop ("Authors of Forever"), Caribbean folk music ("Underdog"), dub ("Wasted Energy"), hip hop ("Me x 7"), downtempo R&B ("Show Me Love"), folk and country ("Gramercy Park"), and chamber music ("Perfect Way to Die"). Keys says that "Time Machine" is influenced specifically by the funk rock band Funkadelic. "Me x 7" has upbeat, sparsely produced rhythms in the manner of its guest mumble rapper Tierra Whack's solo work. A section of Alicia's middle tracks substitute Keys' piano for acoustic guitar within a more free-form style of neo soul. On "Jill Scott" (titled after its guest vocalist), Keys sings in a high register vocal similar to the characteristic style of Scott, who provides a brief spoken word interlude.

Altogether, Alicia is described by The Line of Best Fit writer Udit Mahalingam as a collection of "orchestral pop, acoustic soul, and jittery contemporary R&B", while Nick Smith of musicOMH observes "sonics [that] are manifold", encompassing "reggae, R&B, funk and even country". In comparison to Here, Clash magazine's Shakeena Johnson says it is "less pop and more R&B". Although deeming it often a work of contemporary R&B, Helen Brown of The Independent believes the album conveys traditional soul melodies "through some stranger – and certainly more eclectic – sounds than [Keys has] tried before".

=== Lyrics ===
The conversation turned toward all the varieties of people in the world. Givers and takers. Builders and breakers. Dreamers and bystanders. I tend to want every person to embody the best of humanity – for all of us to be givers and builders and dreamers. That's not reality. At different seasons in life, we each fall into various categories. Even still, every one of us also has a strong behavioral tendency, and that is okay. I'm coming to terms with the fact that so-called perfection – this idea that everything should be beautiful and in order at all times – is just not going to happen.

— Keys in More Myself (2020) discussing Alicia's themes (Note: The quote is recollected from a conversation between Keys and songwriter-producer Johnny McDaid out on the terrace of Oven Studios about their respective experiences as New Yorkers.)

Alicia is described by Keys in More Myself as "a musical exploration of identity – both my own and ours collectively". Continuing in the socially-conscious thematic vein of Here, her impressionistic lyrics and personal narratives throughout the album make sociopolitical connections between the singer's view of herself and the world around her. The album's pervading theme of self-knowledge departs from the thematic focus that had made Keys popular in the past, specifically her meditations on romantic relationships, strong families, and female empowerment. Alicia explores and conceptualizes identity similarly to More Myself, mirroring different dimensions of her relationship to people as a whole; as Keys explains, "what makes us up to be who we are, and the expectations that are put upon us mostly from outside sources – societally or from your family, or from those people that you love, or yourself".

For Keys, writing Alicia encouraged greater introspection and acceptance of her dichotomous identity, the calm and rational side of which she had largely shown up to that point. (Note: In More Myself, Keys writes that she titled the album after herself to reflect the newfound freedom and comprehension of identity she had developed over the course of the creative process.) "I never realized how much I relied on only one side", she explains. "How much I had hidden away the parts that expressed anger, rage, sensuality, or vulnerability." Reflecting on this theme in More Myself, she calls herself "strong and fierce and brave, no doubt", before qualifying that, "I'm also someone who has found myself on the bathroom floor, boo-hooing and feeling vulnerable. I'm also the woman who doesn't always know how to rise to my feet and take the next step." In Pareles' observations, the singer advocates equanimity throughout the album, "but it's often tinged with ambivalence", reflecting "misgivings, recriminations and regrets" shared in her memoir. Similarly, musicOMH journalist Nick Smith observes feelings of "hope, despair, frustration and even ambivalence" in her narratives.

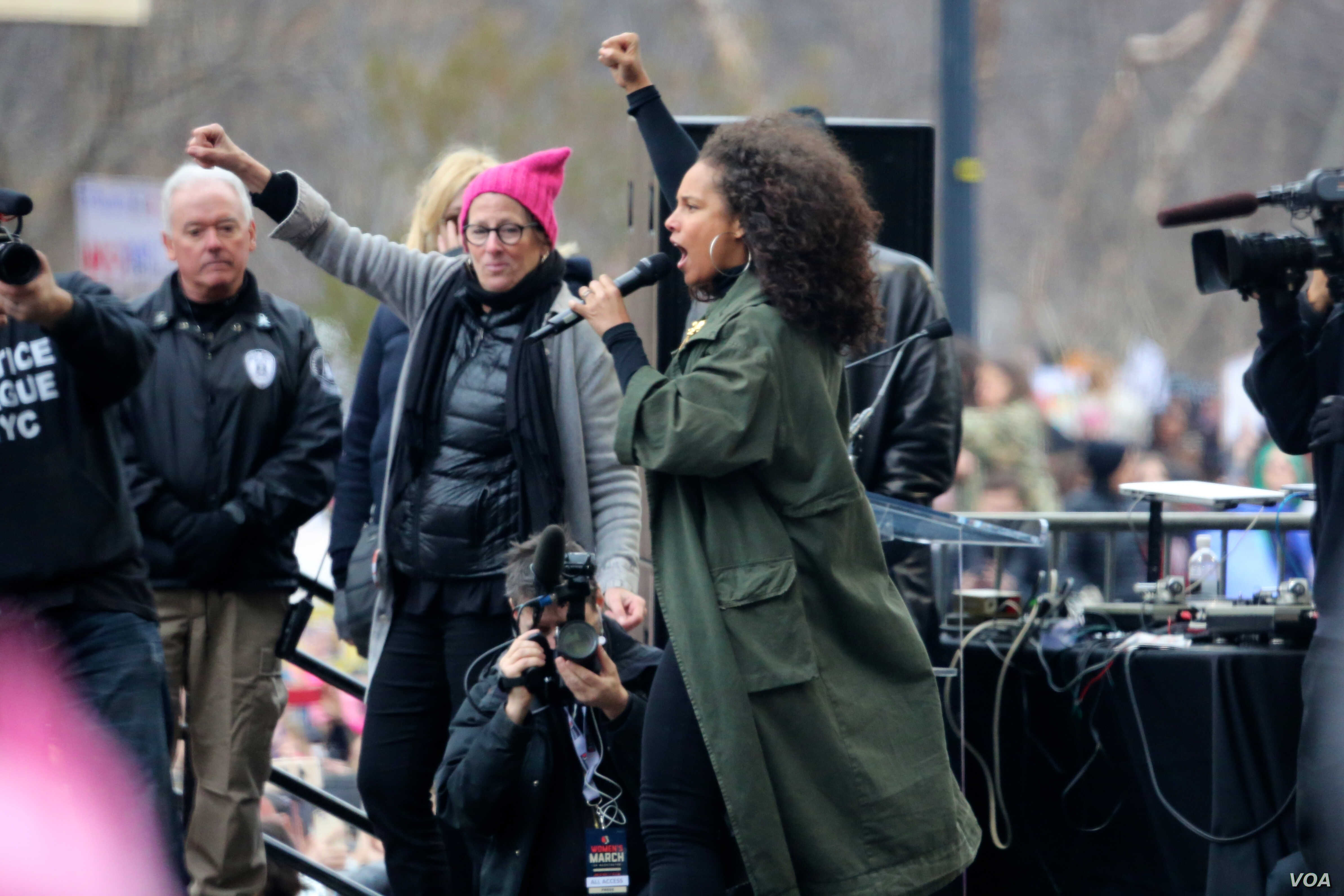
Keys (center) at the 2017 Women's March. Alicia reflects on sociopolitical concerns and the singer's relationship to the world around her.

Alicia opens with "Truth Without Love", which puts forth the idea that truth in society has become "elusive". The next song, "Time Machine", addresses fears of introspection and advocates the pursuit of free thought, rather than longing for the past, as a means to achieve peace of mind. "Underdog" is an ode to "young teachers", "student doctors", and "single mothers waiting on a check to come". Subsequent tracks advocate more positive pleas for hope and change in the world, such as "Authors of Forever". The lyrics to that song promote unity and an understanding of the multifaceted nature in individuals, with Keys reasoning in the lyrics that, "We're here to make meanin' for as long we're breathin' / And it's alright / Whoever you are / It's alright". She regards the track as representative of the album's themes, citing the refrain in particular.

We are lost and lonely people and we're looking for a reason and it's all right
So let's celebrate the dreamers, we embrace the space between us, and it's all right
We're all in this boat together and we're sailing toward the future and it's all right
We can make the whole thing better, we're the authors of forever – and it's all right

— Keys, "Authors of Forever", Alicia

A more desperate sense of hope features in the album's closing series of unadorned piano-and-vocal performances, "Perfect Way to Die" and "Good Job", which thematize police brutality and essential work, respectively. The former is written from the perspective of a mother in grief over her son, who was shot to death by the police, while the latter is written in tribute to "the mothers, the fathers, the teachers that reach us", and other people simply trying to get through an ordinary day. The bonus-track ballad "A Beautiful Noise", featuring Brandi Carlile, advocates voter turnout in the context of a social movement.

Among Alicia's love songs, "3 Hour Drive" has Keys and Sampha each lamenting a lover's separation over a descending chord progression. "Show Me Love" and "Love Looks Better" express more confident relations between lovers. Both the waltz-like "Gramercy Park" and the Khalid duet "So Done" feature Keys trying to make peace with having struggled to appease the expectations of other people, with the latter expressing a departure from "fighting myself, going to hell" in favor of "living the way that I want".

== Marketing ==
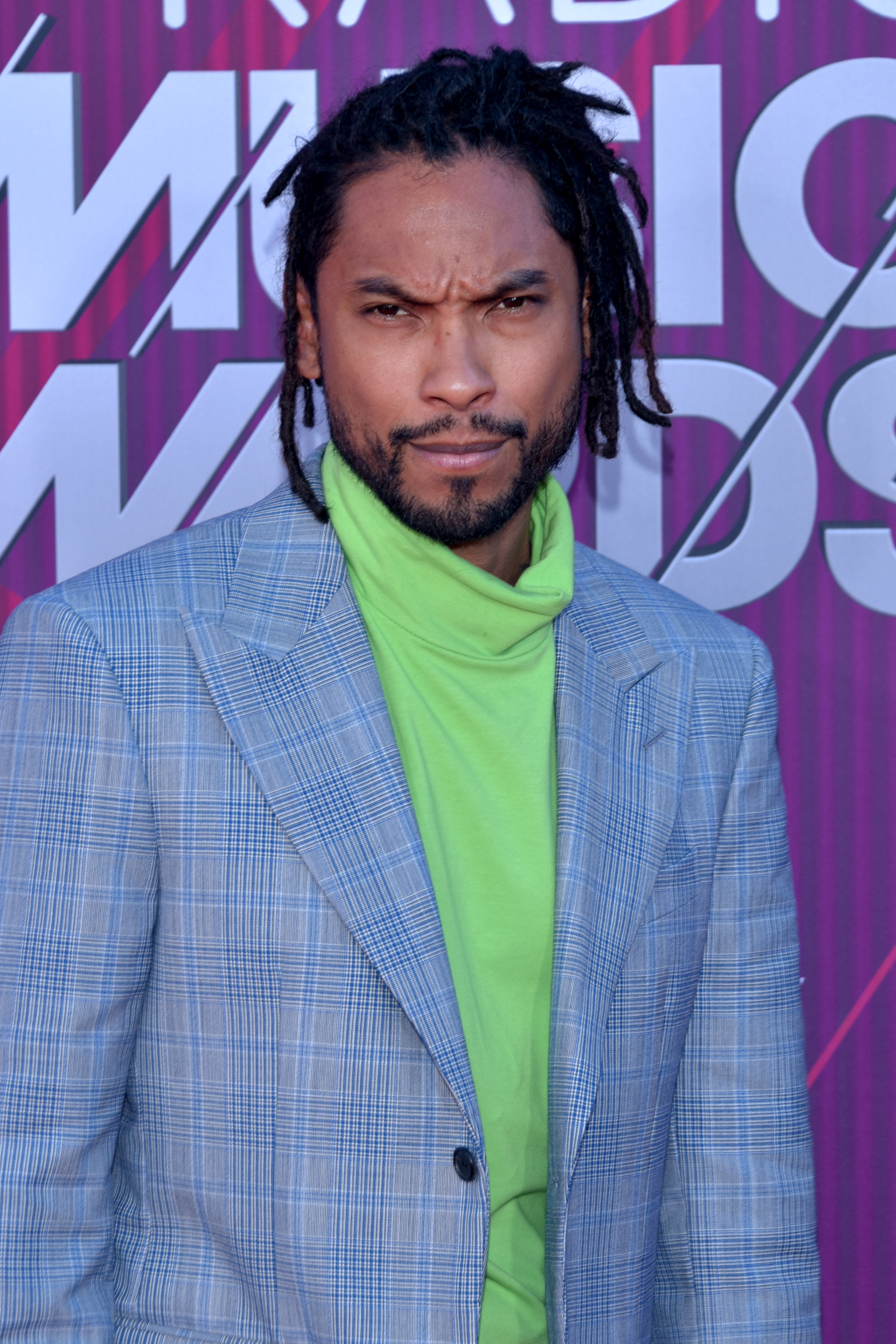
Miguel performed with Keys on the single "Show Me Love" and at the 2019 Latin Grammy Awards.

On September 17, 2019, Keys debuted the album's lead single, "Show Me Love", and its accompanying music video at Dolby Soho in New York City. The first live performance of the track took place that weekend as part of her set at the 2019 iHeartRadio Music Festival. In November, Keys was joined by Miguel, Pedro Capó, and Farruko at the 20th Annual Latin Grammy Awards for a medley of a Spanish version of the song and "Calma" (2018). On November 20, "Time Machine" was released as the next single. Keys revealed the album's title in a December interview with Billboard and formally announced Alicia the following month by posting a release date of March 20, 2020, and the cover art to her Instagram account. In January, Keys also returned as host for the 62nd Annual Grammy Awards, where she was joined by Brittany Howard in a performance of "Underdog" (released as Alicia's third single on January 9). The single was featured in a TV ad for Amazon Music and performed by Keys on The Ellen DeGeneres Show.

Keys also made promotional appearances in Europe, including a guest spot on the radio station NRJ in Paris on February 4, 2020, and a concert at Bush Hall in London on February 7. The latter was an atypically small venue for the singer (with an approximately 400-person crowd that day). At Bush Hall, she was joined by a four-person backing band and two vocalists while playing an upright piano (rather than her customary grand piano) and a Moog synthesizer, used specifically for a psychedelic funk rendition of "Time Machine" and "Try Sleeping with a Broken Heart" (2009). Other songs played were "Unbreakable" (2005), a piano-based cover of Billie Eilish's "Everything I Wanted" (2019), "Show Me Love", the acoustic "Underdog", and the more vocally virtuosic "Girl on Fire" (2012) and "Empire State of Mind Part II" (2010), which closed the show in rousing fashion. For much of the concert, however, "she stood at the upright [piano], bashing out melodies and singing with versatility", as reported by Financial Times critic Ludovic Hunter-Tilney.

Further promotional efforts in the UK included Keys' performance of "Underdog" in February 2020 on both The Graham Norton Show and the Live Lounge segment on BBC Radio 1, where she also performed "Time Machine".

=== Pandemic delays ===
In March 2020, online retailers were listing Alicia for pre-order with a new release date of May 15. In response to the COVID-19 pandemic (declared later in March), Keys became among the many high-profile recording acts and adherents of traditional rollout campaigns to delay their albums, joining Lady Gaga, Willie Nelson, and Sam Smith. The pandemic's closure of physical retailers and distribution systems impacted veteran recording artists especially, as their fans tended to be older and more likely to still purchase CDs and vinyl records. On March 29, Keys performed an acoustic rendition of "Underdog" at the iHeart Living Room Concert for America (staged in response to the COVID-19 pandemic). Prior to the pandemic's declaration, the song had ascended on the record charts and become Keys' most successful single since "Girl on Fire". In April, the singer appeared on The Late Show with Stephen Colbert via video call, where she discussed the album's extended delay and her memoir, which had been published the previous month. She also performed a cover of the Flo Rida song "My House" (2015), with lyrics altered to reflect the collective feelings of listeners living under the COVID-19 lockdowns.

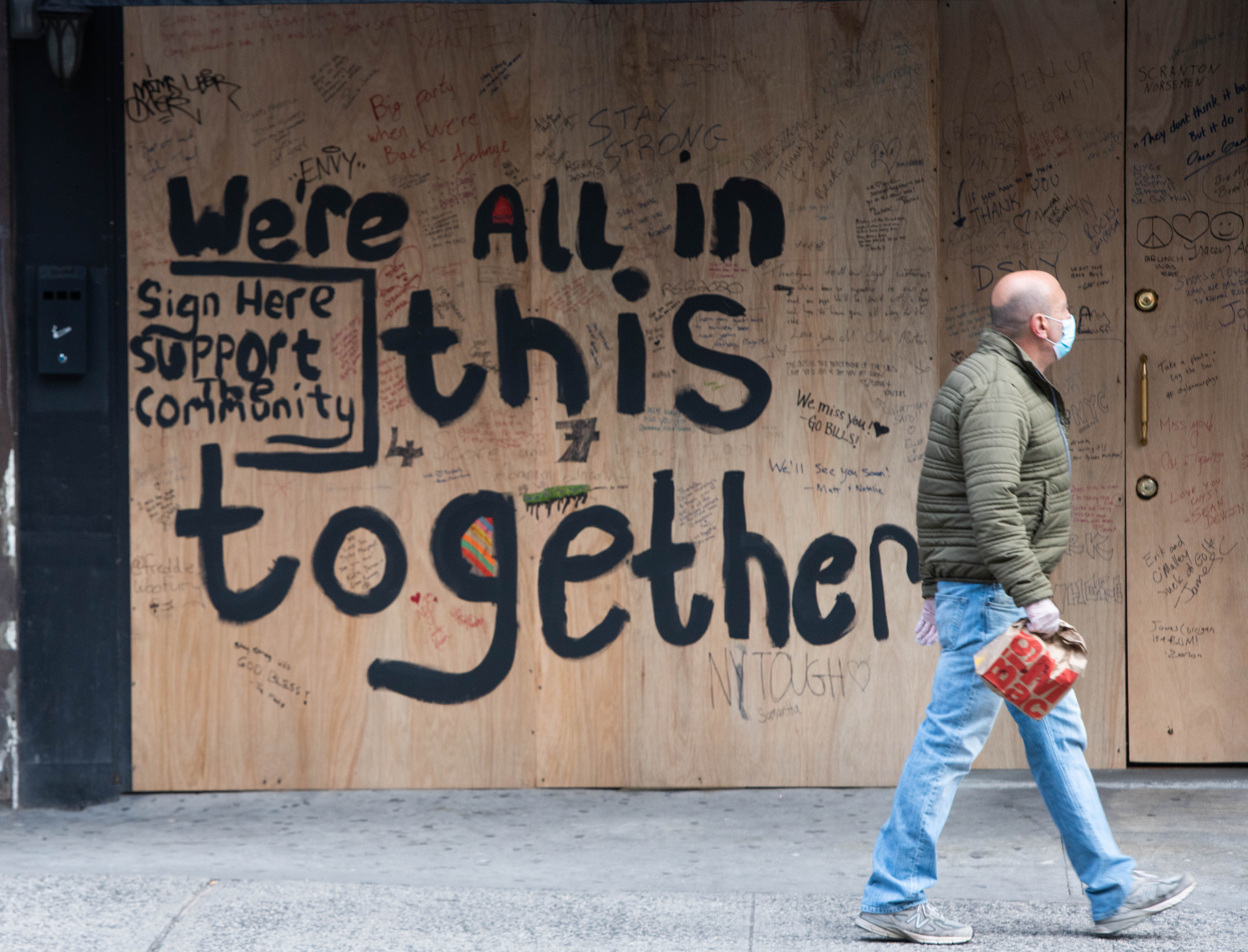
A boarded-up business in New York during the COVID-19 lockdowns, April 2020. The pandemic's disruption of the economy delayed Alicia's release.

Alicia's next single was "Good Job", released on April 23, 2020. It was accompanied with a press release written by Keys, dedicating the song to essential workers and other ordinary people dealing with the pandemic. "Whether you're on the front lines at the hospitals, balancing work, family, and homeschool teaching, delivering mail, packages, or food, or facing other personal difficulties because of COVID-19 ... You are seen, loved, and deeply appreciated", she wrote. Rolling Stone magazine's Jon Blistein found the song's message especially resonant against the backdrop of the pandemic. "Perfect Way to Die" was released as the next single on June 19, coinciding with Juneteenth and amid weeks of civil unrest across the US in response to police brutality against African Americans. While posting the single on her Twitter account, Keys commented on its relevancy and condemned "the destructive culture of police violence" as senseless as the song's titular phrase. "Sometimes I don't have the words and music is the only thing that can speak", she went on to say.⁣ "I hope this speaks to you." She performed "Good Job" and "Perfect Way to Die" on CNN's global town hall broadcast and at the 2020 BET Awards, respectively. The former song was also used as the musical theme to a social media campaign produced by CNN Heroes in recognition of individuals' humanitarian efforts during the pandemic, which Keys said had given the song new meaning: "It's almost like the song was written for this and I didn't know it."

In June 2020, Keys premiered "Gramercy Park" during her first-ever appearance on NPR's Tiny Desk Concerts, alongside performances of "Underdog", "Show Me Love", and her 2001 song "Fallin'". On August 11, "Show Me Love" and "Underdog" were both certified Gold by the Recording Industry Association of America (RIAA), denoting sales of at least 500,000 units for each single. Two more singles were then released: "So Done" on August 14 and "Love Looks Better" on September 10. The latter was debuted by Keys that same day at the NFL Network 2020 Kickoff concert, where she also performed a cover of "Lift Every Voice and Sing", often referred to as the "Black national anthem".

=== Release and sales ===
On September 14, 2020, Keys announced on Twitter that Alicia would be released in four days; Nick Smith of musicOMH later compared the manner of its release to that of a surprise album. During its first week of release, she made appearances on Good Morning America and at the iHeartRadio Music Festival. She also headlined the virtual concert Unstaged in partnership with American Express to coincide with the album's worldwide release on September 18. The London-based marketing firm Diabolical was also hired by Sony Music (the owner of Keys' record label RCA) to design and put up posters promoting the release at various points in the city's eight boroughs. Echoing Alicia's front cover, the design posed a seemingly nude and barefaced Keys against a pale red backdrop with the album title rendered in simple font. Further promotional appearances by the singer included a week-long engagement on The Late Late Show with James Corden from September 21 to 24, an appearance on The One Show on September 24, and a performance at the 2020 Billboard Music Awards on October 14.

In the week of September 27, 2020, Alicia entered the US Billboard 200 chart at the number-four position on the basis of 62,000 album-equivalent units. The recorded units included 51,000 traditional album sales, 10,000 streaming-equivalent units (or 13.6 million in on-demand streams of album tracks), and 1,000 track-equivalent units (sales of individual tracks). It was Keys' eighth album to reach the top 10 of the chart and, according to Billboard, received a sales boost from "a concert ticket/album sale redemption offer with her upcoming US tour". In the UK, Alicia became her eighth album to chart within the top 40, debuting at number 12 on the Official Albums Chart, while in Canada, it debuted at number two and was her highest-charting release since As I Am reached the same position in 2007. In its second week on the Billboard 200, Alicia registered a drop of one-hundred-and-four places, falling to number 108. Altogether, the album spent three weeks on the chart.

Subsequently, Keys performed the televised concert special Alicia Keys Rocks New Year's Eve, pre-recorded in Los Angeles and broadcast by BBC One on December 31, 2020. She had been scheduled to embark on Alicia – The World Tour, with the tour itinerary beginning in June in the UK and continuing through Europe into mid July, followed by a US leg through late September. However, it was delayed into 2021 due to the pandemic, and on May 17, 2021, Keys announced on Twitter that the tour was postponed again for 2022. While the tour was scheduled to end with a September 25, 2022, date in Nashville, an earlier San Diego concert was postponed for November 5 due to concerns about weather conditions. A Latin American leg was added to the tour the following year, running though May with shows in Brazil, Argentina, and Mexico.

On July 30, 2021, RCA released ALICIA: The Selects for streaming. It featured in the following order: "Time Machine", "3 Hour Drive", "Show Me Love", "Authors of Forever", "So Done", "You Save Me", and "Love Looks Better".

== Critical reception ==
Professional ratings
Aggregate scores
Source	Rating
AnyDecentMusic?	7.2/10
Metacritic	77/100
Review scores
Source	Rating
AllMusic	3/5 stars
Clash	7/10
Evening Standard	4/5 stars
The Independent	4/5 stars
Mojo	4/5 stars
NME	4/5 stars
The Observer	3/5 stars
Rolling Stone	3.5/5 stars
Slant Magazine	3.5/5 stars
The Times	4/5 stars

Alicia was met with generally positive reviews. At Metacritic, which assigns a normalized rating out of 100 to reviews from professional publications, the album received an average score of 77, based on 12 reviews. AnyDecentMusic? assigned it a score of 7.2 out of 10, based on the site's assessment of the critical consensus.

Reviewing for The Times, chief music critic Will Hodgkinson hailed Alicia as "songs in the key of modern life from R&B royalty" and welcomed Keys' return to the sophisticated sounds of her first album, Songs in A Minor (2001). Nick Levine, writing for NME, was impressed by the cohesive musical feel throughout and the skill behind Keys' ballads, which he said emanate well-intentioned positive energy and empathic political engagement. He also believed that the album's postponed release amid the pandemic made the subject matter more timely and therapeutic for listeners. Slant Magazine's Sal Cinquemani also applauded the content and compared it to "the most effective political pop", saying Keys "strikes a careful balance between hope and despair". While highlighting the more radically styled collaborations in "Wasted Energy" and "Me x 7", he concluded that Alicia is "at once her most accessible and forward-minded album in years".

In Rolling Stone, Jon Dolan regarded it as among Keys' "most musically engaging" records and felt her strong suit was coping ballads such as "Perfect Way to Die" and "Good Job". "Generosity tempered with humility is a rare and welcome look", he wrote of the singer. "It takes knowledge of self, care for others, truth through a lens of love, to get it right." Expanding on Levine and Dolan's points, Atwood Magazine's Josh Weiner said that the repeated delays had not dated the record's musical qualities while recent events in the world had "rendered it an especially powerful and timely release", particularly in the case of the last two songs. "Great art sure does have a way of gaining even more meaning and impact as time goes on", he concluded.

Several reviewers highlighted Keys' singing on Alicia. In The Sunday Times, Dan Cairns said the compositions are on-par with the "classic" songwriting of her earliest albums and that they accentuate her vocals, which he described as "soaring, swooping, scatting, richly nuanced, deploying full-throated passion and pin-drop restraint". The Arts Desk journalist Joe Muggs singled out Keys' performances on "Perfect Way to Die", "Wasted Energy", and "Time Machine", where her "multi-octave range is put to fantastic use harmonizing with herself". While observing a few instances of flashy singing techniques elsewhere, he speculated whether the album as a whole hints at "a Keys album where she drops the showbiz and kicks out the jams the whole way through". AllMusic reviewer Andy Kellman found Alicia to be performed "with some of her most nuanced vocals", but was less impressed by the material, the best of which he felt had already been released as singles. Ultimately, he deemed it "Keys' most moderate work, seemingly hedged with an objective to appeal to as many listeners as possible". Mojo magazine's James McNair griped about Keys' altruistic politics being "at times a tad cloyingly expressed" on an album otherwise impressive for her "exquisitely malleable voice, slickly inventine production tics, and winning vocal support" from artists such as Sampha and Diamond Platnumz.

=== Accolades ===
For the 2021 NAACP Image Awards, Alicia was nominated in the category of Outstanding Album, while earning Keys a nomination for Outstanding Female Artist. "Jill Scott" and "So Done" received nominations for Outstanding Duo, Group or Collaboration in its subcategories of traditional and contemporary song, respectively. Keys also received Grammy Award nominations in the categories of Best Immersive Audio Album (dedicated to recordings released in surround sound formats) and Song of the Year (for "A Beautiful Noise", which appeared on Alicia's digital edition); these were presented on April 3, 2022, at the 64th Annual Grammy Awards, where she won for Best Immersive Audio Album.

== Track listing ==
Alicia track listing
No.	Title	Writer(s)	Producer(s)	Length
1.	"Truth Without Love"	Alicia Keys; Larrance Dopson; Khirye Tyler; Kasseem Dean; Terius Nash; Justus Alexander West; Damien Romel Farmer	Dopson; Tyler	2:34
2.	"Time Machine"	Keys; Sebastian Kole; Robin Tadross	Keys; Rob Knox; Emile Haynie^{[a]}	4:26
3.	"Authors of Forever"	Keys; Johnny McDaid; Jonny Coffer	Keys; McDaid; Coffer; Mark Ronson^{[a]}	3:37
4.	"Wasted Energy" (featuring Diamond Platnumz)	Keys; Richard Isong; Ariowa Irosogie; Nathaniel Warner; Kali McLoughlin	P2J	4:19
5.	"Underdog"	Keys; McDaid; Ed Sheeran; Foy Vance; Coffer; Amy Wadge	Keys; McDaid	3:24
6.	"3 Hour Drive" (featuring Sampha)	Keys; Sampha Sisay; Jimmy Napes	Keys; Sampha	4:01
7.	"Me x 7" (featuring Tierra Whack)	Keys; Christopher A. Stewart; Patrick William Postlewait; Samuel Kirk Thomas; Jeremiah Bethea; J. Pierre Medor; Tierra Whack	C. "Tricky" Stewart; Postlewait^{[a]}; Medor^{[a]}; Thomas^{[a]}	3:32
8.	"Show Me Love" (featuring Miguel)	Keys; Daystar Peterson; Morgan Matthews; Miguel Pimentel	Keys; Matthews	3:08
9.	"So Done" (featuring Khalid)	Keys; Ludwig Göransson; Khalid Robinson	Göransson	3:54
10.	"Gramercy Park"	Keys; Napes; Sam Romans	Keys; Napes	3:12
11.	"Love Looks Better"	Keys; Ryan Tedder; Dopson; Noel Zancanella; Christopher "Brody" Brown	Keys; Tedder; Zancanella; Dopson^{[a]}	3:23
12.	"You Save Me" (featuring Snoh Aalegra)	Keys; Snoh Nowrozi	Keys	3:41
13.	"Jill Scott" (featuring Jill Scott)	Keys; Delano Matthews; Dean; Jill Scott	Sean C	4:05
14.	"Perfect Way to Die"	Keys; Kole	Keys; Kole	3:31
15.	"Good Job"	Keys; Nash; Dean; Avery Chambliss	Keys	3:53
Total length:				54:40

Digital edition bonus tracks
No.	Title	Writer(s)	Producer(s)	Length
16.	"Three Hour Drive – A Colors Show" (featuring Sir)	Keys	(Note: No producer is credited for the track.)	4:04
17.	"A Beautiful Noise" (with Brandi Carlile)	Keys; Carlile; Brandy Clark; Hailey Whitters; Hillary Lindsey; Linda Perry; Lori McKenna; Ruby Amanfu	Keys; Carlile	3:19
18.	"Wasted Energy" (featuring Diamond Platnumz and Kaash Paige)	Keys; Isong; Irosognie; Warner; McLoughlin	P2J	4:37

=== Notes ===
- ^{^[a]} denotes co-producer

== Personnel and credits ==
Information is taken from the album credits.

=== Recording locations ===
- Conway Recording; Los Angeles, California (recording: track 9, 11)
- ELBO Studios; Los Angeles (recording: track 9)
- Fieldwork Studios; London, UK (recording: track 3, 5)
- Fieldwork Studios; Los Angeles, California (recording: track 5)
- Fieldwork Studios; Nashville, Tennessee (recording: track 5)
- Jungle City; New York (recording: track 1–2, 4–15; mixing: track 12, 15)
- Larrabee Sound; North Hollywood, California (mixing: track 1–2, 4–5, 7–9)
- Mixstar Studios; Virginia Beach Virginia (mixing: track 3, 11)
- Oven Studios; New York (recording: track 1–4, 8, 10–11; mixing: track 12)
- RAK Studios, New York (recording: track 6)
- Record Plant; Los Angeles, California (recording: track 4, 7, 12, 14)
- Triangle Sound; Atlanta, Georgia (recording: track 7)

=== Musicians ===
- Alicia Keys – lead vocals, Moog bass (track 2, 11–12), piano (track 3, 5–6, 10, 12, 14–15), keyboards (track 3, 5–6, 10–11), background vocals (track 5), drum programming (track 6), vocal arrangement (track 8)
- Diamond Platnumz – featured artist (track 4)
- Sampha – featured artist (track 6), keyboards (track 6), piano (track 6)
- Tierra Whack – featured artist (track 7)
- Miguel – featured artist (track 8)
- Khalid – featured artist (track 9)
- Snoh Aalegra – featured artist (track 12)
- Jill Scott – featured artist (track 13)
- John Benthal – electric sitar (track 2)
- Jonny Coffer – programming (track 3, 5)
- Alexandria Dopson – background vocals (track 1)
- Larrance Dopson – keyboards (track 1)
- Dammo Farmer – bass (track 1)
- Ludwig Göransson – keyboards (track 9), bass (track 9), programming (track 9)
- Emile Haynie – additional programming (track 2), programming (track 5), drum programming (track 6)
- Jukebox – programming (track 5), drum programming (track 11)
- Rob Knox – keyboards (track 2), programming (track 2)
- Tory Lanez – vocal arrangement (track 8)
- Morgan Matthews – guitars (track 8)
- Johnny McDaid – bass (track 3, 5), vocoder vocals (track 3), programming (track 3, 5), background vocals (track 5)
- Pierre Medor – keyboards (track 7)
- Ann Mincieli – bass guitar (track 11)
- Jimmy Napes – piano (track 10), drums (track 10)
- P2J – keyboards (track 4), programming (track 4)
- Patrick Postlewait – bass (track 7)
- The Picard Brothers – programming (track 3)
- Will Reynolds – electric guitar (track 5)
- Sam Roman – guitar (track 10)
- Mark Ronson – bass (track 3), guitar (track 3), programming (track 3)
- Davide Rossi – strings arrangement (track 14), strings (track 14)
- Raphael Saadiq – guitars (track 8)
- Ed Sheeran – acoustic guitar (track 5), background vocals (track 5)
- Ash Soan – drums (track 5)
- Tricky Stewart – keyboards (track 7)
- Ryan Tedder – drum programming (track 11), keyboards (track 11)
- Sam Thomas – keyboards (track 7)
- Khirye Tyler – keyboards (track 1)
- Justus West – guitar (track 1)
- Steven Wolf – drums (track 5), programming (track 5)

=== Technical ===
- Alicia Keys – executive production, production (track 2–3, 5–6, 8, 10–12, 14–15)
- Graham Archer – engineering (track 3, 5)
- Jim Caruana – vocals mixing (track 12)
- Jonny Coffer – production (track 3)
- Riccardo Damian – engineering (track 3)
- Scott Desmarais – assistant mixing (track 1–2, 5, 7–9)
- Larrance Dopson – production (track 1), co-production (track 11)
- Chris Galland – mix engineering (track 1–2, 5, 7–9)
- Serban Ghenea – mixing (track 3, 11)
- Ludwig Göransson – production (track 9), engineering (track 9)
- John Hanes – engineering for mix (track 3, 11)
- Emile Haynie – co-production (track 2)
- Jeremie Inhaber – assistant mixing (track 1–2, 5, 7–9)
- Andrew Keller – assistant engineering (track 7–8)
- Kez Khou – assistant
- Rob Knox – production (track 2)
- Sebastian Kole – production (track 14)
- Denis Kosiak – engineering (track 9)
- Dave Kutch – mastering
- Manny Marroquin – mixing (track 1–2, 5, 7–9)
- Tony Maserati – mixing (track 6)
- Morgan Matthews – production (track 8)
- Johnny McDaid – production (track 3, 5), engineering (track 5)
- Pierre Medor – co-production (track 7)
- Ann Mincieli – engineering, recording (track 2, 8), mixing (track 4, 10, 12–15)
- Brendan Morawski – engineering (track 1, 7, 11), assistant engineering (track 2, 8, 10, 12, 14–15), assistant mixing engineering (track 4), additional engineering (track 5), assistant recording (track 5, 9), mixing (track 12–13)
- Jimmy Napes – production (track 10)
- P2J – production (track 4)
- Kevin Peterson – assistant mastering
- Patrick Postlewait – co-production (track 7)
- Will Reynolds – assistant engineering (track 3), assistant recording (track 5)
- Ramon Rivas – assistant
- Mark Ronson – co-production (track 3)
- Sampha – production (track 6)
- Sean C – production (track 13)
- Tricky Stewart – production (track 7)
- Ryan Tedder – production (track 11)
- Sam Thomas – co-production (track 7), engineering (track 7)
- Khirye Tyler – production (track 1)
- Noel Zancanella – production (track 11)

=== Art and design ===
- Alicia Keys – concept
- James Bailey – creative direction
- Jason Bolden – styling
- FISK – design
- Naivasha Johnson – hair
- Ramon Rivas – videography
- Romy Soleimani – skin
- Milan Zrnic – photography

== Charts ==
Chart performance for Alicia
Chart (2020)	Peak position
Australian Albums (ARIA)	13
Austrian Albums (Ö3 Austria)	10
Belgian Albums (Ultratop Flanders)	5
Belgian Albums (Ultratop Wallonia)	18
Canadian Albums (Billboard)	2
Czech Albums (ČNS IFPI)	73
Dutch Albums (Album Top 100)	10
French Albums (SNEP)	28
German Albums (Offizielle Top 100)	14
Irish Albums (Official Charts)	72
Italian Albums (FIMI)	40
Japan Hot Albums (Billboard Japan)	40
Japanese Albums (Oricon)	43
New Zealand Albums (RMNZ)	38
Polish Albums (ZPAV)	19
Portuguese Albums (AFP)	9
Scottish Albums (Official Charts)	12
Spanish Albums (PROMUSICAE)	18
Swiss Albums (Schweizer Hitparade)	4
UK Albums (Official Charts)	12
UK R&B Albums (Official Charts)	3
US Billboard 200	4
US Top R&B/Hip-Hop Albums (Billboard)	3

== Release history ==
Release dates and formats for Alicia
Region	Date	Edition(s)	Format(s)	Label(s)	Ref.
Various	September 18, 2020	Standard	CD; digital download; streaming	RCA	
Various	September 18, 2020	Digital	Digital download; streaming	RCA	
Japan	October 7, 2020	Standard	CD	Sony Music	
Various	October 9, 2020	Live	Digital download; streaming	RCA	
United States	December 18, 2020	Standard	Vinyl	RCA	
Various	July 30, 2021	ALICIA: The Selects	Digital download; streaming	RCA	
