= Good Job (song) =

Single by Alicia Keys

from the album Alicia
- Released: April 23, 2020
- Studio: Jungle City Studios (New York, NY)
- Length: 3:50
- Label: RCA
- Songwriters: Alicia Keys; Terius Nash; Kasseem Dean; Avery Chambliss
- Producer: Alicia Keys

Alicia Keys singles chronology
| "Underdog" (2020) | "Good Job" (2020) | "Perfect Way to Die" (2020) |

"Good Job" is a song by American singer and songwriter Alicia Keys. It was written by Keys, The-Dream, Swizz Beatz and Avery Chambliss and produced by Keys. The song was released through RCA Records on April 23, 2020, as the fourth single from Keys' seventh studio album Alicia (2020).

A piano ballad, the song is dedicated to frontline workers fighting against the COVID-19 pandemic. The song received a positive critical reception, with many complimenting the song's message and Keys' vocals. Keys premiered the song during a performance on CNN, which was used as the song's visual. Lyric video for the song was released on May 28, 2020.

== Background ==
"Good Job" was written by Keys in 2019 before the COVID-19 pandemic. Inspiration behind the song were people in Keys' own life who "work so hard and never hear the words 'good job'", such as her mother and grandmother. In an Instagram post, one of the song's songwriters, The-Dream, explained that Keys "play[ed] some of the idea to Good Job and I fell in love with the idea of the song and shared my own experiences as we seem to feel similar when it comes to the engines that move life unknowingly to most". Keys stated that :" “Crazily enough, this song is like, it was written for this moment…there are so many people who are heroes among us right now”. The song was used in a campaign by Ad Council called Out There for Us, to thank the essential workers during the coronavirus pandemic. The former song was also used as the musical theme to a social media campaign produced by CNN Heroes in recognition of individuals' humanitarian efforts during the pandemic.

== Composition and lyrics ==
The song is written in the key of A♭ major with a 12/8 time signature and a tempo of 60 beats per minute. The song uses piano as the main instrumentation. According to The Suffolk Journal, the lyrics pay tribute to the essential workers during the coronavirus pandemic and it has a similar storyline to Keys song "Underdog". Keys starts the song singing: “You are the engine that makes all things go / And you are always in disguise, my hero” In the song, Keys repeats ""Good job / You're doing a good job". As noted by Sal Cinquemani from Slant, the "spare arrangements of piano and vocal" on the song are "functionally effective at highlighting the lyrical content".

== Critical reception ==
Shakeena Johnson from Clash named the song one of the standout tracks on Alicia. Jon Blistein from Rolling Stone described the song as a "classic Keys ballad". According to PopSugar, "Good Job" is an "empowering and uplifting anthem" that "every essential worker needs to hear and take to heart". Nick Smith from musicOMH called it a "genuine Thursday night clap for all of the essential workers". That Grape Juice called it an "haunting hymn" while Revolt called it an "emotionally-charged number". Euphoria. Magazine described the song as "sonically simple" in which Keys' "assuring, confident voice booms". Fox 2 Detroit also praised Keys' vocals, writing that her "voice reverberat[es] louder with poise and passion as the tune progresses". In their reviews of the Alicia album, Nick Levine from NME wrote that the song is "warm, well-meaning and primed to provide some much-needed musical healing" like most songs on the album while Tara Joshi from The Observer wrote that the song "works wonders with a simple vocal and piano". Konstantinos Pappis from Our Culture Mag singled out the song as one of the album's “most illuminating moments” and wrote that the song is “stirring highlight that might as well be the most vital song Keys has ever penned”.

== Live performances ==
Keys performed the song at CNN Global Town Hall: Coronavirus, Facts and Fears programme on April 23 and Rise Up New York! telethon on May 11, 2020. Keys performed medley of "Good Job" and "Empire State of Mind (Part II) Broken Down" (2010) during Good Morning America on September 17, 2020. Keys performed the song at Verizon Big Concert for Small Business on February 7, 2021.

== Credits and personnel ==
Adapted from Alicia album liner notes.

- Produced by Alicia Keys
- Piano by Alicia Keys
- Engineered and mixed by Ann Mincieli at Jungle City Studios (NYC)
- Assistant engineer: Brendan Morawski

== Charts ==
Chart performance for "Good Job"
| Chart (2020) | Peak position |
|---|---|
| Canadian Digital Song Sales (Billboard) | 42 |
| US R&B Digital Songs Sales (Billboard) | 4 |
