= Underdog (Alicia Keys song) =

2020 single by Alicia Keys

Single by Alicia Keys

from the album Alicia
- Released: January 9, 2020
- Studio: Fieldwork (London, UK); Fieldwork (Los Angeles, CA); Fieldwork (Nashville, TN); Jungle City (New York, NY)
- Genre: Pop; R&B
- Length: 3:24
- Label: RCA
- Songwriters: Alicia Keys; Johnny McDaid; Ed Sheeran; Amy Wadge; Jonny Coffer; Foy Vance
- Producers: Alicia Keys; Johnny McDaid

Alicia Keys singles chronology
| "Time Machine" (2019) | "Underdog" (2020) | "Good Job" (2020) |

Music video
- "Underdog" on YouTube

"Underdog" is a song by American singer-songwriter Alicia Keys. It was written by Keys, Johnny McDaid, Ed Sheeran, Amy Wadge, Jonny Coffer and Foy Vance, and produced by Keys and McDaid for her seventh studio album Alicia (2020). Released on January 9, 2020, as the album's third single, "Underdog" became a top 40 hit in many countries and was certified Platinum by the Recording Industry Association of America, indicating 1,000,000 units recorded in the US.

== Background and release ==
"Underdog" was recorded for Keys' seventh studio album Alicia (2020). Speaking on the meaning behind the song, she told Rolling Stone:

I love this song so much because it's about real life and real people and our experiences. We've all been in a place in our lives where we've had to defy the odds. It's never easy. One of my favorite lyrics in the song is, 'They say I would never make it but I was built to break the mold.' I don't think there's a person on the planet that hasn't felt that way.

"Underdog" was released on January 9, 2020, as the third single from Alicia. Meg Bishop from Minnesota Daily wrote that on the song, Keys "implores listeners to view people in their true context, below the surface of one glance". The single was featured in a TV ad for Amazon Music. On March 27, 2020, the song was remixed by Keys and featured reggae singers Protoje and Chronixx. On May 14, 2021, 16 months after the song's original release date, another remix of the song was released featuring American singer Nicky Jam and Puerto Rican singer Rauw Alejandro. In November 2021, Keys released a lullaby version of the song on Sweet Dreams extended play.

== Critical reception ==
Reviewing for NME, Nick Levine called "Underdog" a "slick pop-R&B single" with "unpretentious and affecting" lyrics. USA Today's Gary Dinges named it among the songs from Alicia that "take on new meaning when you listen to them within the scope of the pandemic and social strife plaguing the country". Adi Mehta from Entertainment Voice wrote that the song's "main melody is hopelessly trite" but "Keys manages to sound so sleek and modest". Konstantinos Pappis from Our Culture Mag wrote that the “uplifting” song is “anchored by Keys’ ability to sell everyday stories about perseverance” and named it one of the album's highlights.

== Live performances ==
Keys performed "Underdog" with Keys and Brittany Howard playing acoustic guitars at the 62nd Annual Grammy Awards and on The Ellen DeGeneres Show on January 29, 2020. Keys performed "Underdog" at BBC Radio 1 Live Lounge on February 6, 2020. Keys performed the song at a concert to promote the Alicia album held at Bush Hall in London as well as on The Graham Norton Show on February 7, 2020. In March, Keys performed an acoustic rendition of the song in iHeart Living Room Concert for America on the 29th and in #KidsTogether: The Nickelodeon Town Hall on the 30th.

Keys performed "Underdog" at fundraising concert From Milan with Love on May 3, at a Salesforce virtual event Leading Through Change on May 21, and Front Row From Home on radio station 106.1 BLI on May 28, 2020. Keys performed the song on Super Soul Sunday on March 29, 2020. On June 7, 2020, Keys performed the song on Dear Class of 2020. In June 2020, Keys performed the song on NPR's Tiny Desk Concerts. Keys performed the song during her Verzuz battle with John Legend on June 19, 2020. Keys performed the song on The Late Late Show with James Corden on September 25, 2020. Keys performed the song during the Alicia Keys Rocks New Year's Eve concert on BBC One on December 31, 2020. The song is performed as part of Alicia + Keys World Tour.

== Music video ==
A corresponding music video directed by Wendy Morgan was released the same day. Thematizing the idea of overcoming challenging situations, the video captures ordinary people hustling to improve their circumstances and is intercut with a dynamic performance from Keys.

== Commercial performance ==
On February 7, 2020, "Underdog" debuted on the Billboard Hot 100 at position 93, making it the second single from Alicia to chart on the Hot 100. "Underdog" later peaked at number 69.

== Track listings ==
- Digital download
1. "Underdog" – 3:24
- Digital download
1. "Underdog" (Acoustic Version) – 3:30
- Digital download
1. "Underdog" (Remix) (featuring Chronixx and Protoje) – 2:59
- Digital download
1. "Underdog" (Nicky Jam & Rauw Alejandro Remix) (featuring Nicky Jam & Rauw Alejandro) – 3:25

== Charts ==
=== Weekly charts ===
| Chart (2020) | Peak position |
|---|---|
| Australia Digital Tracks (ARIA) | 36 |
| Austria (Ö3 Austria Top 40) | 24 |
| Belgium (Ultratop 50 Flanders) | 13 |
| Belgium (Ultratop 50 Wallonia) | 6 |
| Canada AC (Billboard) | 34 |
| Canada Hot AC (Billboard) | 37 |
| Croatia (HRT) | 9 |
| Czech Republic Airplay (ČNS IFPI) | 3 |
| Euro Digital Song Sales (Billboard) | 12 |
| Germany (GfK) | 24 |
| Hungary (Rádiós Top 40) | 19 |
| Hungary (Single Top 40) | 19 |
| Iceland (Tónlistinn) | 20 |
| Japanese Downloads (Billboard Japan) | 76 |
| Mexico Ingles Airplay (Billboard) | 16 |
| Netherlands (Dutch Top 40) | 11 |
| Netherlands (Single Top 100) | 41 |
| New Zealand Hot Singles (RMNZ) | 7 |
| Romania (Airplay 100) | 85 |
| Scotland Singles (OCC) | 60 |
| Slovakia Airplay (ČNS IFPI) | 16 |
| Slovenia (SloTop50) | 24 |
| Switzerland (Schweizer Hitparade) | 21 |
| UK Singles Downloads (OCC) | 35 |
| US Billboard Hot 100 | 69 |
| US Adult Contemporary (Billboard) | 12 |
| US Adult Pop Airplay (Billboard) | 16 |
| US Hot R&B/Hip-Hop Songs (Billboard) | 30 |
| US Pop Airplay (Billboard) | 27 |

=== Year-end charts ===
| Chart (2020) | Position |
|---|---|
| Belgium (Ultratop Flanders) | 39 |
| Belgium (Ultratop Wallonia) | 24 |
| Hungary (Rádiós Top 40) | 92 |
| Netherlands (Dutch Top 40) | 31 |
| Switzerland (Schweizer Hitparade) | 97 |
| US Adult Contemporary (Billboard) | 23 |
| US Adult Top 40 (Billboard) | 41 |

== Certifications ==
| Region | Certification | Certified units/sales |
|---|---|---|
| Austria (IFPI Austria) | Platinum | 30,000^{‡} |
| Canada (Music Canada) | Gold | 40,000^{‡} |
| France (SNEP) Remix version | Gold | 100,000^{‡} |
| Germany (BVMI) | Gold | 200,000^{‡} |
| New Zealand (RMNZ) | Gold | 15,000^{‡} |
| Switzerland (IFPI Switzerland) | Gold | 10,000^{‡} |
| United States (RIAA) | Platinum | 1,000,000^{‡} |
^{‡} Sales+streaming figures based on certification alone.
