= Time Machine (Alicia Keys song) =

2019 single by Alicia Keys

Single by Alicia Keys

from the album Alicia
- Released: November 20, 2019
- Studio: Jungle City (New York, NY); Oven (New York, NY)
- Genre: R&B; funk
- Length: 4:30
- Label: RCA
- Songwriters: Alicia Keys; Sebastian Kole; Rob Knox
- Producers: Alicia Keys; Rob Knox

Alicia Keys singles chronology
"Show Me Love" (2019)	"Time Machine" (2019)	"Underdog" (2020)

Music video
- "Time Machine" on YouTube

"Time Machine" is a song by American singer and songwriter Alicia Keys. It was written by Keys, Sebastian Kole and Rob Knox and produced by Keys and Rob Knox, with co-production from Emile Haynie. The song was released on November 20, 2019, through RCA Records as the second single from Keys' seventh studio album Alicia (2020).

As a song with retro-funk sound, the song is a departure from Keys' previous singles. The song received a positive critical reception, with many critics complimenting the new musical direction. A music video directed by Art Johnson and Cole Cook was released on the same day and features a cameo from American rapper Tierra Whack. Remixes by Cedric Gervais, MK and KC Lights were released in February 2020. In the United States, the song peaked on the Billboard Dance Club Songs at number 25 in March 2020.

== Background ==
In September 2019, Keys released the first single "Show Me Love" featuring Miguel, from her then untitled seventh studio album. In November, it was announced that Keys would host the 62nd Annual Grammy Awards, having hosted it also the previous year. Keys released "Time Machine" after announcing 2020 Grammy nominees on November 20, 2019, with Gayle King and Bebe Rexha on CBS This Morning.

On the song's release day, Keys tweeted: "You have your roller skates ready? I’ve been dying for you to hear this one!!". In an interview with Entertainment Weekly, Keys described the song as "a zone — it's such a vibration and frequency that you can't help but just feel good".

== Composition and lyrics ==
"Time Machine" is an R&B song and is composed in key of E♭ minor with a tempo of 106 beats per minute. As described by Althea Legaspi from Rolling Stone, the lyrics talk about "letting go of hang-ups and finding freedom". On the chorus, Keys "croons": "No we can't rewind/Life ain't no time machine. But once you free your mind/There is beauty in everything". Nick Smith from musicOMH described the song as having a "backdrop of retro-funk and sitars" and according to him, the song "advocates mindfulness and forward thinking, rather than overanalysing and harking back to the past". Adi Mehta from Entertainment Voice described the song as having a "sculpted dark noise framed in an instantaneous, minimal dance beat". Andy Kellman from Allmusic wrote that the song is "built on a sliding groove" and likened the song to "Cranes in the Sky" by Solange. Meg Bishop from Minnesota Daily wrote that the song is "carpeted with funk pop" and according to her reminiscent of "Mirror" by Lil Wayne and "Man in the Mirror" by Michael Jackson.

== Critical reception ==
Rap-Up described the song as a "retro-funk bop". Vulture described the song with the words "smooth, old-school" and "throwback". According to New Music Weekly, the song "celebrates the freedom that comes with letting go". Michael Saponara from Billboard noted that the production of the song is "a stark change compared to the heavy key-laden records we've become accustomed to from Keys recently". Writing for Rated R&B, Anders Hare opined that the "haunting" song "steadily grows in intensity as Keys delivers some of the best vocals to date". musicOMH's Nick Smith in his review of the Alicia album found Keys' vocals on the song "divine". According to Shakeena Johnson from Clash, the song "takes you back to the sound of the 80s". Andy Kellman from Allmusic named it one of the highlights on the album and wrote that it is Keys' "funkiest and spaciest songs, unlike anything else she has recorded". Adi Mehta from Entertainment Voice praised the vocals, writing that "Keys sings with an effortless cool and seasoned showmanship, with her increasingly impassioned, wispy utterances giving way to angelic falsetto cascades". The Arts Desk's Joe Muggs wrote that the song "is a heavy disco-funk stomp, where Keys's multi-octave range is put to fantastic use harmonising with herself" and added that "dirty synth basslines and sitars are treated to all sorts of trippy effects". A. D. Amorosi from Variety gave a positive review of the song, writing that the "swipe-and-swoosh soul" of the song "finds Keys’ reverb-dripping voice pushed to the back, then given multilayered harmonies, before reaching a synth-bass-filled chorus".

== Music video ==
The music video was released on November 20, 2019. It was directed by Art Johnson and Keys’ brother Cole Cook and filmed at World on Wheels in Los Angeles.

== Live performances ==
Keys performed "Time Machine" along with "Underdog" (2020), "Try Sleeping with a Broken Heart" (2009), Billie Eilish song "Everything I Wanted" (2019) and "Fallin'" (2001) at BBC Radio 1 Live Lounge on February 6, 2020. Keys performed the song at a concert to promote the Alicia album held at Bush Hall in London on February 7, 2020. Keys performed the song during the Alicia Keys Rocks New Year's Eve concert on BBC One on December 31, 2020. The song is performed as part of Alicia + Keys World Tour.

== Track listings ==
- Digital download
1. "Time Machine" – 4:30
- Digital download (Remixes)
1. "Time Machine" (Cedrick Gervais Remix) – 3:01
2. "Time Machine" (MK Remix) – 3:38
3. "Time Machine" (KC Lights 6am Remix) – 4:08

== Charts ==
Chart (2020)	Peak position
UK Singles Downloads (Official Charts)	90
US Dance Club Songs (Billboard)	25
