= Show Me Love (Alicia Keys and Miguel song) =

Single by Alicia Keys featuring Miguel

from the album Alicia
- Released: September 17, 2019
- Studio: Jungle City (New York, NY); Oven (New York, NY)
- Length: 3:08
- Label: RCA
- Songwriters: Alicia Keys; Daystar Peterson; Morgan Matthews; Miguel Pimentel
- Producers: Alicia Keys; Morgan Matthews

Alicia Keys singles chronology
"Calma (Alicia Remix)" (2019)	"Show Me Love" (2019)	"Time Machine" (2020)

Miguel singles chronology
"I Found You / Nilda's Story" (2019)	"Show Me Love" (2019)	"Funeral" (2019)

Music video
- "Show Me Love" on YouTube

"Show Me Love" is a song by American singers and songwriters Alicia Keys and Miguel. It was written by Keys, Miguel, Tory Lanez (credited to his legal name Daystar Peterson), and guitarist-producer Morgan Matthews, while production was handled by Keys and Matthews. The song was released on September 17, 2019 through RCA Records with UMPG as the lead single from Keys' seventh studio album Alicia. It is an R&B ballad involving feelings of desire. A remix version of the song featuring rapper 21 Savage was released on November 4, 2019.

The song received positive reviews from music critics, who went on to compliment the chemistry between the duo, as well as praising its sultriness and charm. Commercially, the song debuted on the US Billboard Hot 100 chart at number 90, becoming Keys' first single as a lead artist to debut on that chart in seven years; the last one being "Girl on Fire" (2012). It would also become her eleventh chart topper on Adult R&B Songs, extended her record as the artist with the most number ones on the chart. A music video directed by Cara Stricker was released on the same day, and it features actors Michael B. Jordan, Zoe Saldaña and her husband Marco Perego Saldaña, alongside Keys and Miguel.

As of March 2024, the song has been certified Platinum by the RIAA.

== Background ==
After the release of her sixth studio album, Here (2016), Keys took a time off from music, and served as coach from the American singing competition series The Voice, where she would remain for three seasons. During 2017, she released a few singles, such as a collaborative track with KAYTRANADA on "Sweet F'n Love" and "That's What's Up", a song that samples Kanye West's "Low Life". Meanwhile, in 2019, she released the acclaimed single Raise a Man", while also embarking on a remix version of the latin successful song "Calma". During the week of its release, Keys posted a series of videos teasing a visual from what was going to be the video for the song. On September 16, 2019, a day before the song's release, Keys announced she was going to release "Show Me Love" with its accompanying music video the following day. On November 4, 2019, Keys released a remixed version of the song featuring rapper 21 Savage.

== Critical reception ==
Adi Mehta from Entertainment Voice called it a "Spanish guitar laden track" in which "Keys sings in airy, sinuous stretches", exchanging "thrilling harmonies" with Miguel. Konstantinos Pappis from Our Culture Mag wrote that the song "comes off as painfully generic" and named it one of the album's "weakest spots".

== Live performances ==
Keys performed the track for the first time during her appearance at the iHeartRadio Music Festival in Las Vegas on September 21, 2019. She also performed the song at Global Citizen Festival on September 28, 2019. In October, Keys performed the song on Jimmy Kimmel Live! from Tidal X Rock the Vote concert. In November, Keys was joined by Miguel, Pedro Capó, and Farruko at the 20th Annual Latin Grammy Awards for a medley of a Spanish version of the song and "Calma" (2019). In June 2020, Keys performed the song on NPR's Tiny Desk Concerts. Keys performed the song at a concert to promote the Alicia album held at Bush Hall in London on February 7, 2020. The song is performed as part of The Alicia + Keys World Tour.

== Track listings ==
- Digital download
1. "Show Me Love" – 3:08
- Digital download
1. "Show Me Love" (Remix) – 3:59

== Credits and personnel ==
"Show Me Love" credits and personnel.

- Songwriters – Alicia Keys, Daystar Peterson, Morgan Matthews, Miguel Pimentel
- Producers – Alicia Keys, Morgan Matthews
- Recording engineer – Ann Mincieli
- Engineer – Chris Galland
- Mastering engineer – Dave Kutch
- Mixing engineer – Manny Marroquin
- Assistant engineers – Jeremie Inhaber, Brendan Morawski, Andrew Keller, Scott Desmarais
- Associated performers – Alicia Keys, Miguel
- Guitars – Raphael Saadiq, Morgan Matthews

== Charts ==
=== Weekly charts ===
Chart (2019)	Peak position
US Billboard Hot 100	90
US Hot R&B/Hip-Hop Songs (Billboard)	41
US R&B/Hip-Hop Airplay (Billboard)	8
US Adult R&B Songs (Billboard)	1

=== Year-end charts ===
Chart (2020)	Position
US Adult R&B Songs (Billboard)	19

== Certifications ==
Region	Certification	Certified units/sales
United States (RIAA)	Platinum	1,000,000^{‡}
^{‡} Sales+streaming figures based on certification alone.
