= So Done (Alicia Keys song) =

Single by Alicia Keys featuring Khalid

from the album Alicia
- Released: August 14, 2020
- Studio: Conway (Los Angeles, CA); ELBO (Los Angeles, CA); Jungle City (New York, NY)
- Length: 3:54
- Label: RCA
- Songwriters: Alicia Keys; Khalid; Ludwig Göransson
- Producer: Ludwig Göransson

Alicia Keys singles chronology
| "Perfect Way to Die" (2020) | "So Done" (2020) | "Love Looks Better" (2020) |

Khalid singles chronology
| "Be Like That" (2020) | "So Done" (2020) | "Otra Noche Sin Ti" (2021) |

Music video
- "So Done" on YouTube

"So Done" is a song by American singer Alicia Keys featuring fellow American singer Khalid. Written alongside producer Ludwig Göransson, the song was released on August 14, 2020 through RCA Records as the sixth single from her seventh studio album Alicia. The song is a mid-tempo R&B song and talks about living freely and on your own terms. A music video directed by Andy Hines was released on the same day and stars actress Sasha Lane alongside Keys and Khalid.

== Critical reception ==
Entertainment Voice's Adi Mehta wrote that the song "reaches new emotional depths, with a vulnerable intimacy from Keys that sends chills", adding that Keys and Khalid sound "wide-eyed and dreamy" on the song. Andy Kellman from AllMusic described it as "soft, intimate love ballad" on which "Keys and Khalid make an ideal pair". Meg Bishop from Minnesota Daily wrote that "[l]istening to the track feels like an act of self-care" adding that "[t]he song fits perfectly into the tracklist" with "some smooth lo-fi beats" and "the repeated lyrics, “I’m living the way that I want.”. Konstantinos Pappis from Our Culture Mag wrote that the song features “spare electric guitar and luminous vocals“ and that it “excel[s] at capturing an utterly entrancing mood” and “evokes a kind of listless, late-night vibe that somehow manages to amplify the album’s overall message of inner strength”.

== Live performances ==
Keys performed the song at the iHeartRadio Music Festival on September 18, 2020. Keys performed the song during Good Morning America on September 19, 2020. Keys and Khalid performed the song together as part of the drive-in concert series on The Late Late Show with James Corden on September 22, 2020. The song is performed as part of The Alicia + Keys World Tour.

== Charts ==
=== Weekly charts ===
Weekly chart performance for "So Done"
| Chart (2020) | Peak position |
|---|---|
| Netherlands (Single Tip) | 27 |
| New Zealand Hot Singles (RMNZ) | 10 |
| US Adult R&B Songs (Billboard) | 1 |

=== Year-end charts ===
2020 year-end chart performance for "So Done"
| Chart (2020) | Position |
|---|---|
| US Adult R&B Songs (Billboard) | 42 |

2021 year-end chart performance for "So Done"
| Chart (2021) | Position |
|---|---|
| US Adult R&B Songs (Billboard) | 14 |

== Certifications ==
| Region | Certification | Certified units/sales |
|---|---|---|
| Brazil (Pro-Música Brasil) | Gold | 20,000^{‡} |
^{‡} Sales+streaming figures based on certification alone.
