= NAACP Image Award for Outstanding Duo or Group =

American music award

This article lists the winners and nominees for the NAACP Image Award for Outstanding Duo or Group. The award is also often called Outstanding Duo, Group, or Collaboration. Currently Beyoncé holds the record for most wins in this category with eight, including her five awards as part of Destiny's Child. In 2022 for the 52nd NAACP Image Awards, for the time, the category was split into two separate sections for both "contemporary" and "traditional" forms.

== 1980s ==
Year	Artist	Ref
1980
1980	The Jacksons	
1981
1981	Commodores	
1982
1982	Kool & the Gang	
1983
1983	Gladys Knight and the Pips	
1984 – 86	—N/a	
1987
1987	Atlantic Starr	
1987	Cameo	
1987	Loose Ends	
1987	LeVert	
1987	The Whispers	
1988
1988	Gladys Knight and the Pips	
1988	LeVert	
1988	Loose Ends	
1988	New Edition	
1988	Earth, Wind & Fire	
1989
1989	LeVert	
1989	Kool & the Gang	
1989	The O'Jays	
1989	Skyy	
1989	Surface	

== 1990s ==
Year	Artist	Ref
1990
1990	After 7	
1991	—N/a	
1992
1992	The O'Jays	
1992	Boyz II Men	
1992	Color Me Badd	
1992	En Vogue	
1992	LeVert	
1993
1993	Boyz II Men	
1994
1994	En Vogue	
1995	—N/a	
1996
1996	Boyz II Men	
1996	Kirk Franklin and the Family	
1996	Hootie & the Blowfish	
1996	Sade	
1996	TLC	
1997
1997	Kirk Franklin and the Family	
1997	Blackstreet	
1997	The Fugees	
1997	New Edition	
1997	Bebe Winans and Cece Winans	
1998
1998	Boyz II Men	
1998	Dru Hill	
1998	God's Property	
1998	The Isley Brothers	
1998	Sounds of Blackness	
1999
1999	Whitney Houston and Mariah Carey	
1999	Boyz II Men	
1999	Brandy & Monica	
1999	K-Ci & JoJo	
1999	The Temptations	

== 2000s ==
Year	Artist	Ref
2000
2000	Destiny's Child	
2000	K-Ci & JoJo	
2000	Les Nubians	
2000	Sounds of Blackness	
2000	TLC	
2001
2001	Destiny's Child	
2001	Kirk Franklin and the Family	
2001	Quincy Jones and Sammy Nestico	
2001	Mary Mary	
2001	Lucy Pearl	
2002
2002	Destiny's Child	
2002	Kirk Franklin and Jill Scott	
2002	The Isley Brothers	
2002	The O'Jays	
2002	Outkast	
2003
2003	India.Arie and Stevie Wonder	
2003	Erykah Badu and Common	
2003	Mary Mary	
2003	The Roots	
2003	TLC	
2004
2004	OutKast	
2004	The Black Eyed Peas	
2004	Mary J. Blige and Eve	
2004	The Neptunes	
2004	The Roots	
2005
2005	Destiny's Child	
2005	Ray Charles and Gladys Knight	
2005	The O'Jays	
2005	New Edition	
2005	The Roots	
2006
2006	Destiny's Child	
2006	The Black Eyed Peas	
2006	Ray Charles and Various Artists	
2006	Earth, Wind & Fire	
2006	Floetry	
2007
2007	The Roots	
2007	Dave Matthews Band	
2007	Gnarls Barkley	
2007	Outkast	
2007	The Cheetah Girls	
2008
2008	Eddie Levert and Gerald Levert	
2008	Bow Wow and Omarion	
2008	Aretha Franklin and Fantasia	
2008	Stephen Marley and Damian Marley	
2008	Sounds of Blackness	
2009
2009	Jennifer Hudson and Fantasia	
2009	Natalie Cole and Nat King Cole	
2009	Anthony David and India.Arie	
2009	Estelle and Kanye West	
2009	Jordin Sparks and Chris Brown	

== 2010s ==
Year	Artist	Ref
2010
2010	The Black Eyed Peas – The E.N.D.	
2010	3 Mo' Divas	
2010	Day26	
2010	Jay Z and Alicia Keys	
2010	Jay Z, Rihanna and Kanye West	
2011
2011	John Legend and The Roots	
2011	The Black Eyed Peas – "The Beginning"	
2011	Diddy-Dirty Money	
2011	Eminem and Rihanna – "Love The Way You Lie"	
2011	Herbie Hancock, Chaka Khan and India.Arie	
2012
2012	Mary J. Blige and Drake	
2012	Boyz II Men	
2012	Cee Lo Green and Melanie Fiona	
2012	The Roots	
2012	Sounds of Blackness	
2013
2013	Mary Mary	
2013	Chuck D, Johnny Juice, will.i.am and Herbie Hancock	
2013	fun. feat. Janelle Monáe – "We Are Young"	
2013	Lupe Fiasco feat. Guy Sebastian	
2013	Ne-Yo, Herbie Hancock, Johnny Rzeznik, Delta Rae and Natasha Bedingfield	
2014
2014	Robin Thicke, T.I. and Pharrell – "Blurred Lines"	
2014	Toni Braxton and Babyface	
2014	Mariah Carey and Miguel – "#Beautiful"	
2014	Alicia Keys and Miguel	
2014	Justin Timberlake and Jay Z – "Suit & Tie"	
2015
2015	Sam Smith and Mary J. Blige – "Stay With Me"	
2015	Toni Braxton and Babyface	
2015	Smokey Robinson and Mary J. Blige	
2015	Pharrell Williams and Daft Punk – "Get Lucky"	
2015	Pharrell Williams and Justin Timberlake	
2016
2016	Empire Cast feat. Estelle and Jussie Smollett – "Conqueror"	
2016	Alabama Shakes	
2016	Big Sean, Kanye West and John Legend	
2016	Cast of Hamilton: An American Musical	
2016	Janet Jackson and J. Cole – "No Sleeep"	
2017
2017	Beyoncé feat. Kendrick Lamar	
2017	Robert Glasper and Miles Davis	
2017	Alicia Keys feat. A$AP Rocky	
2017	Solange feat. Lil Wayne	
2017	Sounds of Blackness feat. High School for Recording Arts	
2018
2018	Kendrick Lamar feat. Rihanna	
2018	Mary J. Blige feat. Kanye West – "Love Yourself"	
2018	Andra Day feat. Common – "Stand Up For Something"	
2018	SZA feat. Travis Scott – "Love Galore"	
2018	Charlie Wilson feat. T.I. – "I'm Blessed"	
2019
2019	Kendrick Lamar & SZA – "All the Stars"	
2019	John Legend feat. BloodPop – "A Good Night"	
2019	H.E.R. feat. Bryson Tiller – "Could've Been"	
2019	Bruno Mars feat. Cardi B – "Finesse (Remix)"	
2019	The Carters – "Everything Is Love"	

== 2020s ==
Year	Artist	Ref
2020
2020	Blue Ivy, Saint Jhn, Beyoncé & Wizkid – "Brown Skin Girl"	
2020	Chris Brown feat. Drake – "No Guidance"	
2020	PJ Morton feat. JoJo – "Say So"	
2020	Ari Lennox & J. Cole – "Shea Butter Baby"	
2020	Alicia Keys & Miguel – "Show Me Love"	
2021
2021	Chloe x Halle – "Wonder What She Thinks of Me"	
2021	Alicia Keys feat. Jill Scott – "Jill Scott"	
2021	Jimmy Jam and Terry Lewis feat. Babyface – "He Don’t Know Nothin’ Bout It"	
2021	Kem feat. Toni Braxton – "Live Out Your Love"	
2021	Ledisi & PJ Morton – "Anything For You"	
2021	Megan Thee Stallion feat. Beyoncé – "Savage (Remix)"	
2021	Alicia Keys feat. Khalid – "So Done"	
2021	Big Sean feat. Nipsey Hussle – "Deep Reverence"	
2021	Chloe x Halle – "Do It"	
2021	Jhené Aiko feat. H.E.R. – "B.S."	
2022
2022	Silk Sonic – "Leave the Door Open"	
2022	Anthony Hamilton feat. Jennifer Hudson – "Superstar"	
2022	Chloe x Halle – "Georgia on My Mind"	
2022	Jazmine Sullivan feat. H.E.R. – "Girl Like Me"	
2022	Leela James feat. Anthony Hamilton – "Complicated (Remix)"	
2022	Tobe Nwigwe feat. Fat Nwigwe – "Fye Fye"	
2022	Chris Brown feat. Young Thug, Future, Lil Durk and Latto – "Go Crazy"	
2022	Doja Cat feat. SZA – "Kiss Me More"	
2022	Drake feat. Future and Young Thug – "Way 2 Sexy"	
2022	H.E.R. feat. Chris Brown – "Come Through"	
2023
2023	Silk Sonic – "Love's Train"	
2023	Kendrick Lamar feat. Blxst and Amanda Reifer – "Die Hard"	
2023	Mary J. Blige feat. H.E.R. – "Good Morning Gorgeous (Remix)"	
2023	PJ Morton feat. Alex Isley and Jill Scott – "Still Believe"	
2023	Summer Walker, Cardi B and SZA – "No Love (Extended Version)"	
2023	Chris Brown feat. Wizkid – "Call Me Every Day"	
2023	Beyoncé feat. Grace Jones and Tems – "Move"	
2023	City Girls feat. Usher – "Good Love"	
2023	Future feat. Drake and Tems – "Wait for U"	
2023	Latto feat. Mariah Carey and DJ Khaled – "Big Energy (Remix)"	
2024
2024	Ciara and Chris Brown – "How We Roll"	
2024	Coco Jones feat. Justin Timberlake – "ICU (Remix)"	
2024	Dreamville, Bas and Black Sherif feat. Kel-P – "Creed III: Soundtrack"	
2024	Karen Clark Sheard, Hezekiah Walker and Kierra Sheard – "God Is Good"	
2024	Voices of Fire – "Joy (Unspeakable)"	
2024	Chris Brown feat. Davido and Lojay – "Sensational"	
2024	Burna Boy feat. 21 Savage – "Sittin' on Top of the World"	
2024	Lil Durk feat. J. Cole – "All My Life"	
2024	Usher, Summer Walker and 21 Savage – "Good Good"	
2024	Victoria Monét feat. Lucky Daye – "Smoke"	
2025
2025	Adam Blackstone and Fantasia – "Summertime"	
2025	Leela James feat. Kenyon Dixon – "Watcha Done Now"	
2025	Maverick City Music feat. Miles Minnick – "God Problems (Not by Power)"	
2025	Muni Long and Mariah Carey – "Made for Me"	
2025	Sounds of Blackness feat. Jamecia Bennett and Buddy McLain – "Thankful"	
2025	Wizkid feat. Brent Faiyaz – "Piece of My Heart"	
2025	FLO and GloRilla – "In My Bag"	
2025	GloRilla feat. Kirk Franklin, Maverick City Music, Kierra Sheard and Chandler Moore – "Rain Down on Me"	
2025	Usher and Burna Boy – "Coming Home"	
2025	Victoria Monét feat. Usher – "SOS (Sex on Sight)"	
2026
2026	803Fresh feat. Fantasia – "Boots on the Ground (Remix)"	
2026	Clipse, Kendrick Lamar, Pharrell Williams, Pusha T, Malice – "Chains & Whips"	
2026	Cynthia Erivo, Ariana Grande – "For Good"	
2026	Mariah Carey with The Clark Sisters – "Jesus I Do"	
2026	Travis Greene with Andra Day – "Let Freedom Ring"	
2026	Chris Brown feat. Bryson Tiller & Usher – "It Depends"	
2026	Cardi B feat. Kehlani – "Safe"	
2026	Kwn feat. Kehlani – "Worst Behavior"	
2026	FLO – "The Mood"	
2026	Leon Thomas feat. Chris Brown – "Mutt (Remix)"	

== Multiple wins and nominations ==
=== Wins ===
8 wins

- Beyoncé (5 with Destiny's Child)

5 wins

- Destiny's Child

4 wins

- Chris Brown

3 wins

- Boyz II Men
- Fantasia
- Kendrick Lamar

2 wins

- Eddie Levert (1 with LeVert)
- Gerald Levert (1 with LeVert)
- Silk Sonic

=== Nominations ===
9 nominations

- Chris Brown

6 nominations

- Alicia Keys
- Sounds of Blackness

5 nominations

- Destiny's Child
- The Roots
- Kendrick Lamar
- Usher

4 nominations

- The Black Eyed Peas
- Mary J. Blige
- Boyz II Men
- Fantasia
- Mariah Carey

3 nominations

- Babyface
- Toni Braxton
- Kirk Franklin and the Family
- Jay Z
- Mary Mary
- Miguel
- The O'Jays
- Outkast
- Justin Timberlake
- J. Cole
- Wizkid
- Pharrell Williams
- Cardi B

2 nominations

- Big Sean
- Chloe x Halle
- Ray Charles
- H.E.R.
- PJ Morton
- New Edition
- Jill Scott
- Silk Sonic
- TLC
- Summer Walker
- Lil Durk
- Kierra Sheard
- Maverick City Music
- Kirk Franklin
- GloRilla
- Burna Boy
- Victoria Monét
- Andra Day
- Bryson Tiller
- Kehlani
- FLO
