= Rob Knox (producer) =

American record producer and songwriter

Robin Tadross (born August 8, 1980), professionally known as Rob Knox, is an American Grammy nominated record producer and songwriter. He is best known for working with artists including Justin Timberlake, Lil Wayne, T.I., Rihanna, Britney Spears and Chris Brown. Knox has produced singles including "Dead and Gone" by T.I. and Justin Timberlake and "Love Sex Magic" by Ciara and Justin Timberlake.

== Credits ==
Artist(s)	Year	Album	Song
B5	2007	Don't Talk, Just Listen	"What It Do"
Chris Brown	2007	Exclusive	"Lottery" "Help Me" "Get At Ya"
Katharine Mcphee	2007	Katharine Mcphee	"Do What You Do"
Marques Houston	2007	Veteran	"Always And Forever"
T.I.	2008	Paper Trail	"Dead and Gone" (featuring Justin Timberlake)
Britney Spears	2008	Circus	"Mannequin"
Ciara	2009	Fantasy Ride	"Love Sex Magic" (featuring Justin Timberlake) "G Is For Girl"
Esmée Denters	2009	Otta Here	"Bigger Than The World"
Leona Lewis	2009	Echo	"Don't Let Me Down" (featuring Justin Timberlake)
Rihanna	2009	Rated R	"Hole In My Head" (featuring Justin Timberlake) "Cold Case Love"
Elliott Yamin	2009	Fight For Love	"Door Way"
Jamie Foxx	2010	Best Night Of My Life	"Winner" (featuring Justin Timberlake and T.I.)
Joe Jonas	2011	Fast Life	"Just In Love" (featuring lil Wayne) "Sorry"
Justin Timberlake	2013	The 20/20 Experience	"Dress On" (featuring Timbaland) "Body Count" (featuring Timbaland)
Justin Timberlake	2013	The 20/20 Experience 2 of 2	"Blindness"
Logic	2013	Under Pressure	"Metropolis"
Prince Royce	2015	Double Version	"Paris On A Sunday"
Jon Bellion	2015	The Human Condition	"Woke the Fuck Up"
Isac Elliot	2016	A Little More	"Not for Nothing"
Charlie Wilson	2017	In It to Win It	"Us Trust" (featuring Wiz Khalifa)
Charlie Wilson	2017	In It to Win It	"Dance Tonight"
Charlie Wilson	2017	In It to Win It	"Better"
Charlie Wilson	2017	In It to Win It	"Gold Rush" (featuring Snoop Dogg)
Justin Timberlake	2018	Man of the Woods	"Morning Light" (featuring Alicia Keys)
Justin Timberlake	2018	Man of the Woods	"The Hard Stuff"
Lennon Stella	2019	Non-album single	"Bitch (Takes One to Know One)"
Alicia Keys	2020	Alicia	"Time Machine"
Meek Mill	2020	TBA	"Believe" (featuring Justin Timberlake)
Justin Timberlake	2024	Everything I Thought It Was	"Sanctified" (featuring Tobe Nwigwe)
Justin Timberlake	2024	Everything I Thought It Was	"Flame"
Agnez Mo, Ciara	2024	Non Album Single	"Get Loose"
Lisa	2025	Alter Ego	"Thunder"
Nmixx	2026	Heavy Serenade	"Loud"

== Singles ==
Title	Year	Peak Chart Position	Certifications	Album
"Dead And Gone" (featuring T.I. and Justin Timberlake)	2008	2	3× Platinum	Paper Trail
"Love Sex Magic"	2009	10	-	Fantasy Ride

== Cites ==
https://www.vevo.com/watch/nuvotv/DJ-Skee-deconstructs-Dead-and-Gone-with-Rob-Knox-(The-Collective-Powered-by-VEVO)/TIVEV1413564 http://www.grammyintheschools.com/features/real-rob-knox http://ca.complex.com/music/2013/03/the-25-best-justin-timberlake-songs/justin-timberlake-dead-gone http://popcrush.com/justin-timberlake-cast-characters-2020-experience http://rollingout.com/2008/12/18/the-next-great-hitmaker-rob-knox-marches-to-the-beat-of-his-own-drum http://istandardproducers.com/interviews/rk http://www.blazetrak.com/professional?proid=106633 http://channeldynamic.com/rob-knox-music-producer-bio-discography http://www.blazetrak.com/professional-bio?proid=10 http://thelosangelesbeat.com/2014/05/ascap-i-create-music-expo http://www.billboard.com/articles/list/466094/king-back-tis-10-biggest-billboard-hits http://www.billboard.com/artist/299324/ciara/chart?f=379
