= Alicia + Keys World Tour =

2022–2023 concert tour by Alicia Keys

- Tour by Alicia Keys
- Tour poster
- Associated album: Alicia; Keys
- Start date: June 9, 2022
- End date: May 19, 2023
- Legs: 3
- No. of shows: 19 in Europe; 35 in North America; 5 in South America; 59 total

Alicia Keys concert chronology
- Set the World on Fire Tour (2013); Alicia + Keys World Tour (2022–2023); Keys to the Summer Tour (2023)

The Alicia + Keys World Tour was the sixth concert tour by American singer and songwriter Alicia Keys in support of her seventh and eighth studio albums Alicia (2020) and Keys (2021). This is Keys' first global tour since her 2013 Set the World on Fire Tour. The tour started on June 9, 2022, at the Utilita Arena in Birmingham, England, and is set to conclude on May 19, 2023, at the Telmex Auditorium in Mexico, South America, after 59 concerts in 20 countries and 3 continents. (Note: The tour was announced before the COVID-19 pandemic. The European leg of the tour was supposed to begin on June 5, 2020 in Dublin, Ireland and conclude on July 20, 2020 in Krakow, Poland. The North American leg was supposed to run from July 28 through September 22, 2020, concluding in Miami, Florida.) Recordings from the concerts in São Paulo, Buenos Aires, Santiago, Bogotá and Mexico City were released as digital live albums. The tour earned nearly $35 million from 51/59 shows in 2022. Keys performed 8 shows as part of the Latin American leg in 2023.

== Background ==
Keys announced the tour on January 21, 2020 along with the release date of her seventh studio album Alicia. The tour is Alicia Keys’ first world concert tour in seven years, with her last world tour being her Set the World on Fire Tour in 2013. American Express card holders in select markets in Europe and North America were able to purchase tickets on pre-sale. Tickets for several engagements sold out, prompting additional dates to be added to the tour.

== Critical reception ==
For the concert at the AO Arena in Manchester, Louisa Gregson from Manchester Evening News wrote that Keys "deliver[ed] a slick but highly charged performance" and her "range and tone was as soulful as ever, enough to give goose bumps, enough to transport you mentally to her part of the world". Adam Davidson from Clash, who reviewed The O2 Arena concert in London, wrote that the concert “encapsulated why she is one of the great talents of modern music” and without many brakes in the concert, Keys “managed to hit all the difficult notes right to the end and was on top form throughout". He further commented that Keys “can do it all: sing, play piano, DJ and most importantly put on an incredible spectacle for her fans”.

Gary Graff from The Oakland Press wrote that Keys “deftly blended musical substance with visual style and just a bit of schtick, but with a grounded earthiness and intimacy that’s often missing from the spectacles of her pop and soul peers”. In her review of the Jacobs Pavilion concert in Cleveland, Annie Nickoloff from Cleveland.com noted that “Keys instantly commanded the crowd before she sang a note or struck a single piano key” and further commented that Keys “regularly sat at the piano, showing off her prowess of the instrument, meshing her performance with her talented backing band to create soulful, jazz-tinged textures”. For the concert at the Huntington Bank Pavilion, Eloise Marie Valadez from The Times of Northwest Indiana wrote that "Keys kept the audience's attention with her impeccable vocals and exceptional keyboard playing" and performed a "fascinating segment" of original and unlocked versions of songs. In his review of the Smart Financial Centre concert, Douglas Devaughn from Houston Press noted that "Her show is almost two hours of hits" and concluded that "while Alicia has been gone from the major tour circuit for almost a decade, she hasn’t lost a step". Reviewing Keys’ concert at Seminole Hard Rock Tampa Event Center in Tampa, Maggie Duffy from Tampa Bay Times wrote that Keys “connected with the audience throughout her intimate concert” and “went on to deliver an outstanding live performance that cemented her as one of the greatest musicians and singers of all time”.

== Set list ==
=== European set list ===
1. "Nat King Cole"
2. "Truth Without Love"
3. "You Don't Know My Name"
4. "Wasted Energy"
5. "Time Machine"
6. "Karma"
7. "Un-Thinkable (I'm Ready)"
8. "So Done"
9. "3 Hour Drive"
10. "Show Me Love"
11. "Diary"
12. "The Gospel" / "Plentiful" / "Nobody"
13. "Skydive"
14. "Is It Insane"
15. "Only You"
16. "Authors of Forever"
17. "Unbreakable"
18. "My Boo"
19. "City of Gods (Part II)"
20. "Empire State of Mind (Part II) Broken Down"
21. "Try Sleeping with a Broken Heart"
22. "Girl on Fire"
23. "Superwoman"
24. "Dead End Road"
25. "Fallin'"
26. "In Common" (Black Coffee Remix)
27. "Gypsy Woman (She's Homeless)"
28. "Underdog"
29. "No One"
  Encore
30. "Like You'll Never See Me Again"
31. "If I Ain't Got You"

=== North American set list ===
This set list is representative of the concert in Tampa on September 18, 2022. It does not represent all concerts for the tour.

1. "Nat King Cole"
2. "You Don't Know My Name"
3. "Wasted Energy"
4. "Karma"
5. "New Day"
6. "Un-Thinkable (I'm Ready)"
7. "Diary"
8. "The Gospel"
9. "Plentiful"
10. "Nobody"
11. "Skydive"
12. "Is It Insane"
13. "Only You"
14. "A Woman's Worth"
15. "Unbreakable"
16. "My Boo"
17. "City of Gods (Part II)"
18. "Empire State of Mind (Part II) Broken Down"
19. "Try Sleeping with a Broken Heart"
20. "Girl on Fire"
21. "Superwoman"
22. "Fallin'"
23. "In Common" (Black Coffee Remix)
24. "Underdog"
25. "No One"
26. "If I Ain't Got You"

=== Notes ===
- In Manchester, Keys performed "This Charming Man" by The Smiths with Johnny Marr.
- During the show in London, Keys invited Mahalia on stage to perform "Show Me Love", Sampha to perform "3 Hour Drive" and Jorja Smith to perform "On My Mind".
- In Paris, Keys performed "Djadja" with Aya Nakamura.
- In Nashville, Keys performed "Jill Scott" and "The Way" with Jill Scott.
- In Rio de Janeiro and São Paulo, Keys invited Iza on stage to perform "Un-Thinkable (I'm Ready)" and "Dona de Mim".
- In Santiago, Keys was joined on stage by Chilean singer and MC Ana Tijoux to perform a mash-up of her song "1977" and "Girl on Fire".
- In Bogotá, Keys invited Karol G on stage to perform "Mientras Me Curo del Cora" and "No One".

== Tour dates ==
| Date | City | Country | Venue | Attendance | Revenue |
Europe
| June 9, 2022 | Birmingham | England | Utilita Arena | — | — |
| June 11, 2022 | Manchester | England | AO Arena | — | — |
| June 13, 2022 | London | England | The O_{2} Arena | — | — |
| June 15, 2022 | Antwerp | Belgium | Sportpaleis | — | — |
| June 17, 2022 | Oslo | Norway | Oslo Spektrum | — | — |
| June 21, 2022 | Berlin | Germany | Mercedes-Benz Arena | 16,700/17,000 (97%) | — |
| June 23, 2022 | Mannheim | Germany | SAP Arena | 14,960/15,000 (98%) | — |
| June 26, 2022 | Kraków | Poland | Tauron Arena | — | — |
| June 28, 2022 | Milan | Italy | Mediolanum Forum | — | — |
| June 30, 2022 | Barcelona | Spain | Palau Sant Jordi | — | — |
| July 4, 2022 | Madrid | Spain | WiZink Center | 9,126/12,340 (73.9%) | $878,472 |
| July 5, 2022 | Bordeaux | France | Arkéa Arena | — | — |
| July 7, 2022 | Paris | France | Accor Arena | — | — |
| July 8, 2022 | Cologne | Germany | Lanxess Arena | 17,300/20,000 (88%) | — |
| July 10, 2022 | Rotterdam | Netherlands | Rotterdam Ahoy | — | — |
| July 12, 2022 | Zürich | Switzerland | Hallenstadion | 11,200/13,000 (86.15%) | $1,172,766 |
| July 13, 2022 | Munich | Germany | Olympiahalle | 15,000/15,500 (97%) | — |
| July 15, 2022 | Esch-sur-Alzette | Luxembourg | Rockhal | — | — |
| July 18, 2022 | Monaco | | Monte Carlo Casino | — | — |
North America
| August 2, 2022 | Charlotte | United States | Charlotte Metro Credit Union Amphitheatre | — | — |
| August 3, 2022 | Baltimore | United States | Pier Six Pavilion | — | — |
| August 5, 2022 | Oxon Hill | United States | MGM National Harbor Theater | 2,707/2,769 (97.7%) | $313,601 |
| August 6, 2022 | Atlantic City | United States | Hard Rock Live | — | — |
| August 7, 2022 | Philadelphia | United States | The Met Philadelphia | — | — |
| August 9, 2022 | Boston | United States | Leader Bank Pavilion | — | — |
| August 11, 2022 | New York City | United States | Radio City Music Hall | 11,888/11,888 (100%) | $1,362,746 |
| August 12, 2022 | New York City | United States | Radio City Music Hall | 11,888/11,888 (100%) | $1,362,746 |
| August 14, 2022 | Toronto | Canada | Budweiser Stage | — | — |
| August 16, 2022 | Sterling Heights | United States | Michigan Lottery Amphitheatre | — | — |
| August 18, 2022 | Cincinnati | United States | PNC Pavilion | — | — |
| August 19, 2022 | Cleveland | United States | Jacobs Pavilion | — | — |
| August 21, 2022 | Maryland Heights | United States | St. Louis Music Park | — | — |
| August 23, 2022 | Chicago | United States | Huntington Bank Pavilion | — | — |
| August 24, 2022 | Kansas City | United States | Starlight Theatre | — | — |
| August 25, 2022 | Denver | United States | Bellco Theatre | — | — |
| August 28, 2022 | Seattle | United States | WaMu Theater | — | — |
| August 29, 2022 | Vancouver | Canada | Rogers Arena | — | — |
| August 31, 2022 | Portland | United States | Theater of the Clouds | — | — |
| September 3, 2022 | San Francisco | United States | Chase Center | — | — |
| September 5, 2022 | Inglewood | United States | YouTube Theater | — | — |
| September 6, 2022 | Los Angeles | United States | Greek Theatre | — | — |
| September 7, 2022 | Los Angeles | United States | Greek Theatre | — | — |
| September 10, 2022 | Phoenix | United States | Arizona Financial Theatre | — | — |
| September 13, 2022 | Sugar Land | United States | Smart Financial Centre | — | — |
| September 14, 2022 | Irving | United States | The Pavilion at Toyota Music Factory | — | — |
| September 16, 2022 | Hollywood | United States | Hard Rock Live | — | — |
| September 17, 2022 | Orlando | United States | Walt Disney Theater | — | — |
| September 18, 2022 | Tampa | United States | Hard Rock Event Center | — | — |
| September 23, 2022 | Atlanta | United States | Cadence Bank Amphitheatre | — | — |
| September 24, 2022 | Nashville | United States | Ascend Amphitheater | — | — |
| November 5, 2022 (Note: The concert in San Diego on November 5, 2022, was originally scheduled on September 9, 2022, at CalCoast Credit Union Open Air Theatre, before being postponed due to weather conditions.) | San Diego | United States | Viejas Arena | — | — |
Latin America
| May 3, 2023 | Rio de Janeiro | Brazil | Jeunesse Arena | — | — |
| May 5, 2023 | São Paulo | Brazil | Allianz Parque | — | — |
| May 7, 2023 | Buenos Aires | Argentina | Movistar Arena | 5,693 | — |
| May 9, 2023 | Santiago | Chile | Movistar Arena | 11,129 | — |
| May 11, 2023 | Bogotá | Colombia | Movistar Arena | 14,000 | — |
| May 14, 2023 | Monterrey | Mexico | Auditorio Citibanamex | — | — |
| May 17, 2023 | Mexico City | Mexico | Auditorio Nacional | — | — |
| May 19, 2023 | Zapopan | Mexico | Telmex Auditorium | — | — |
| Total | | | | — | — |

=== Cancellations ===
| Date | City | Country | Venue |
|---|---|---|---|
| June 18, 2022 | Stockholm | Sweden | Avicii Arena |
| June 20, 2022 | Hamburg | Germany | Barclays Arena |
| June 25, 2022 | Prague | Czech Republic | O2 Arena |
