= Love Looks Better =

Single by Alicia Keys

from the album Alicia
- Released: September 10, 2020
- Studio: Conway (Los Angeles, CA); Jungle City (New York, NY); Oven (New York, NY)
- Length: 3:23
- Label: RCA
- Songwriters: Alicia Keys; Ryan Tedder; Larrance Dopson; Noel Zancanella; Christopher "Brody" Brown
- Producers: Alicia Keys; Ryan Tedder; Noel Zancanella; Larrance Dopson

Alicia Keys singles chronology
"So Done" (2020)	"Love Looks Better" (2020)	"A Beautiful Noise" (2020)

Music video
- "Love Looks Better" on YouTube

"Love Looks Better" is a song by American recording artist Alicia Keys. It was written by Keys, Ryan Tedder, Larrance Dopson, Noel Zancanella, Christopher "Brody" Brown and produced by Keys, Tedder, Zancanella and Dopson. The song was released through RCA Records as the seventh single from Keys' seventh studio album Alicia (2020) on September 10, 2020.

== Background ==
"Love Looks Better" was originally recorded for Keys' sixth studio album Here (2016). In an interview for Revolt, Keys' recording engineer Ann Mincieli explained the creative process of the song:

"So many producers tried to work on it, but in the end, it went back to Alicia peeling the layers back. We had Jukebox, Ryan Tedder, Alicia, Swizz, and other producers who took a stab at it and it didn’t work. It was Alicia, in the end, pulling few pieces from Ryan and added some things on her own for you to hear her lyrics, vocals, and emotions without all the scratches, scribbles, stutters, and production that was overtaking the song".

According to Keys, the song "really talks about how busy we’ve become, how fast we got used to moving, and now we realise that my love looks better on you. It’s time to really be present for each other".

== Composition ==
Nick Smith from musicOMH wrote that "trademark Ryan Tedder shimmer and bombastics" are heard on the song. Sal Cinquemani from Slant wrote that the song "update[s] the “No One” template" with "swooning synths". Adi Mehta from Entertainment Voice called it "perfect pop song" and noted the song's "mobilizing stomp" and "Coldplay piano refrain" with the "ubiquitous “Oh Oh” chants".

== Critical reception ==
Aaron William from Uproxx described it as an "anthemic song" that "employs a booming beat" while the lyrics, in his view, "implore rekindling passion in a stalled relationship". According to the Manila Standard, the "high-energy" song is "loud, passionate, and unapologetically vulnerable". Nick Smith from musicOMH opined that the "lofty" song contains "some celestial piano and vocals" and named it the album's stand-out track. In her review of Alicia, Tara Joshi from The Observer wrote that the song is one in which the lyrics "occasionally" are "heavy on platitudes", and described the song as "EDM-lite"

== Music video ==
The music video for the single was released on September 24, 2020 and was directed by Gina Prince-Bythewood. The video is set in New York City streets, and begins with a scene in which Keys is either according to Uproxx "whisked away to a fancy event" or according to Rap-Up "filming a video". Keys sees a girl on the street with a fist in the air and follows her, first, in a car and, then, by running barefoot on the street. Keys "dramatically" gets rid of her skirt and picks up a pair of Timberland boots from a power line. In the end of the video, Keys, according to Revolt "performs an impromptu concert on top of a parked truck" and eventually founds the girl on a stoop and dances and vibes to the song with her. The video also features images of people showing their support for the Black Lives Matter movement. Keys released behind the scenes footage of making of the video on September 27, 2020.

== Live performances ==
Keys performed "Love Looks Better" along with a rendition of "Lift Every Voice and Sing" at the 2020 NFL Kickoff event on September 10, 2020. Keys performed the song on Good Morning America on September 17, 2020. Keys performed the song at the iHeartRadio Music Festival on September 18, 2020. Keys performed the song on The Late Late Show with James Corden on September 21, 2020. Keys performed the song at the 2020 Billboard Music Awards on October 14 and on Japanese television show Sukkiri on October 20, 2020.

Keys performed the song on The Jonathan Ross Show on November 7, 2020. Keys performed the song at the 2020 MTV Europe Music Awards on November 8, 2020. Due to the COVID-19 pandemic, Keys' performance for the show was filmed on a moving truck in downtown Los Angeles. Keys performed the song along with a medley of "Ave Maria" and "Fallin'" (2001) for SiriusXM, which performance aired on December 18, 2020. Keys performed the song during the Alicia Keys Rocks New Year's Eve concert on BBC One on December 31, 2020.

== Charts ==
Chart (2020)	Peak position
Belgium (Ultratip Bubbling Under Wallonia)	39
Netherlands (Dutch Top 40 Tipparade)	23

== Release history ==
Region	Date	Format	Label	Ref.
United States	September 21, 2020	Hot/Modern/AC	RCA	
