= A Beautiful Noise =

2020 song by Alicia Keys and Brandi Carlile

Single by Alicia Keys and Brandi Carlile
- Released: October 29, 2020
- Studio: Record Plant (Los Angeles, CA)
- Genre: R&B; soul
- Length: 3:19
- Label: RCA
- Songwriters: Alicia Keys; Brandi Carlile; Brandy Clark; Hailey Whitters; Hillary Lindsey; Linda Perry; Lori McKenna; Ruby Amanfu
- Producers: Alicia Keys; Brandi Carlile

Alicia Keys singles chronology
"Love Looks Better" (2020)	"A Beautiful Noise" (2020)	"Wasted Energy (Remix)" (2021)

Brandi Carlile singles chronology
"Hold On" (2020)	"A Beautiful Noise" (2020)	"Take Me Home, Country Roads" (2021)

Music video
- "A Beautiful Noise" on YouTube

"A Beautiful Noise" is a song recorded by American recording artists Alicia Keys and Brandi Carlile. The song was written by Keys, Carlile, Brandy Clark, Hillary Lindsey, Lori McKenna, Hailey Whitters, Linda Perry and Ruby Amanfu. It was released as a single on October 29, 2020, through RCA Records. The song was performed live on Every Vote Counts: A Celebration of Democracy, and they released the single immediately following the song's premiere on CBS. The song was also included on the digital reissue of Keys' seventh studio album Alicia (2020), released on December 18, 2020. The song received a nomination for Song of the Year at the 64th Annual Grammy Awards.

== Background ==
"A Beautiful Noise" was recorded to inspire American voters to vote in the 2020 presidential election. The song was created by an all-female songwriting team consisting of Alicia Keys, Brandi Carlile, Brandy Clark, Hillary Lindsey, Lori McKenna, Hailey Whitters, Linda Perry and Ruby Amanfu. Brandy Clark was the first songwriter added to the team, followed by Lori McKenna, Hillary Lindsey and so on. The song was passed around between all eight writers with the goal of representing diversity through a variety of views, voices, and perspectives. In a Variety article, Ali Harnell of Live Nation discussed how the song came to be, stating that they had hoped to celebrate women's suffrage in advance of the 2020 Presidential Election. The year 2020 marks the 100-year anniversary of the Nineteenth Amendment to the United States Constitution and the 55th anniversary of the Voting Rights Act of 1965, and the song aims to honor these causes according to Harnell.

The #ABeautifulNoise Challenge was created on social media inspired by the song to encourage voter turnout via social channels. The #ABeautifulNoice Challenge tasks viewers with sharing how and why they plan to make a beautiful noise in the 2020 election and beyond. Keys commented that "Everyone has the power to make beautiful noise and to lift others up with their voice. And now more than ever, we need to let those voices be heard by voting". Carlile stated that the song "is an important reminder that we all have a voice and that our voices count".

== Composition and lyrics ==
The song is a stripped-down, piano-driven R&B/soul track that lasts for a duration of three minutes and nineteen seconds. It is written in the key of A♭ minor with a 4/4 time signature and a tempo of 76 beats per minute. Jon Blistein from Rolling Stone described the song as "straightforward but effective bit of piano balladry". Writer for the website PopSugar stated that the "powerful track" offers "a dose of inspiration" in lyrics like "It's believing you belong / It's calling out the wrong". In the song, Keys and Carlile assure that "I have a voice", and writing for the website Live For Live Music, Michael Broerman opined that the song "tell[s] the story of marginalized communities finally gaining their birthright to fully participate in society". Sidney Miller from Country Queer wrote that albeit having "a sense of anger and righteousness", the "calming, melodic" song "masterfully blends both of their piano-playing skills and voices".

== Live performance ==
Alicia Keys hosted CBS' Every Vote Counts: A Celebration of Democracy special alongside Kerry Washington and America Ferrera which is where the song was first premiered. Alicia Keys and Brandi Carlile sat at separate pianos across from each other as they performed a live rendition of the song. Keys and Carlile performed with no additional musical accompaniment besides their pianos.

== Charts ==
Chart performance for "A Beautiful Noise"
Chart (2020)	Peak position
US Digital Song Sales (Billboard)	8
