= Dead and Gone =

2009 song by T.I. featuring Justin Timberlake

Single by T.I. featuring Justin Timberlake

from the album Paper Trail
- Released: January 12, 2009
- Recorded: 2008
- Genre: Conscious hip-hop
- Length: 4:59 (album version); 3:52 (radio edit)
- Label: Grand Hustle; Atlantic
- Songwriters: Clifford Harris, Jr.; Justin Timberlake; Robin Tadross
- Producers: Justin Timberlake; Rob Knox

T.I. singles chronology
"Ain't I" (2008)	"Dead and Gone" (2009)	"Day Dreaming" (2009)

Justin Timberlake singles chronology
"4 Minutes" (2008)	"Dead and Gone" (2009)	"Love Sex Magic" (2009)

"Dead and Gone" is a song by American rapper T.I. featuring singer Justin Timberlake. It became available for digital download in September 2008 and was released on January 12, 2009 as the eighth single from T.I.'s sixth studio album, Paper Trail (2008). Due to the high number of digital downloads upon the album's release, the song debuted on the Billboard Hot 100 before its official single release. The song marked the second collaboration between T.I. and Justin Timberlake, the first being the hit single "My Love", from Timberlake's second album, FutureSex/LoveSounds (2006).

T.I. and Timberlake performed this song at the 51st Grammy Awards. The song was later nominated twice at the 52nd Grammy Awards, for Best Rap/Sung Collaboration and Best Rap Song. It was the 10th bestselling digital single of 2009 in the United States. As of early February 2018, it had sold 3.5 million copies in the country.

== Background and composition ==
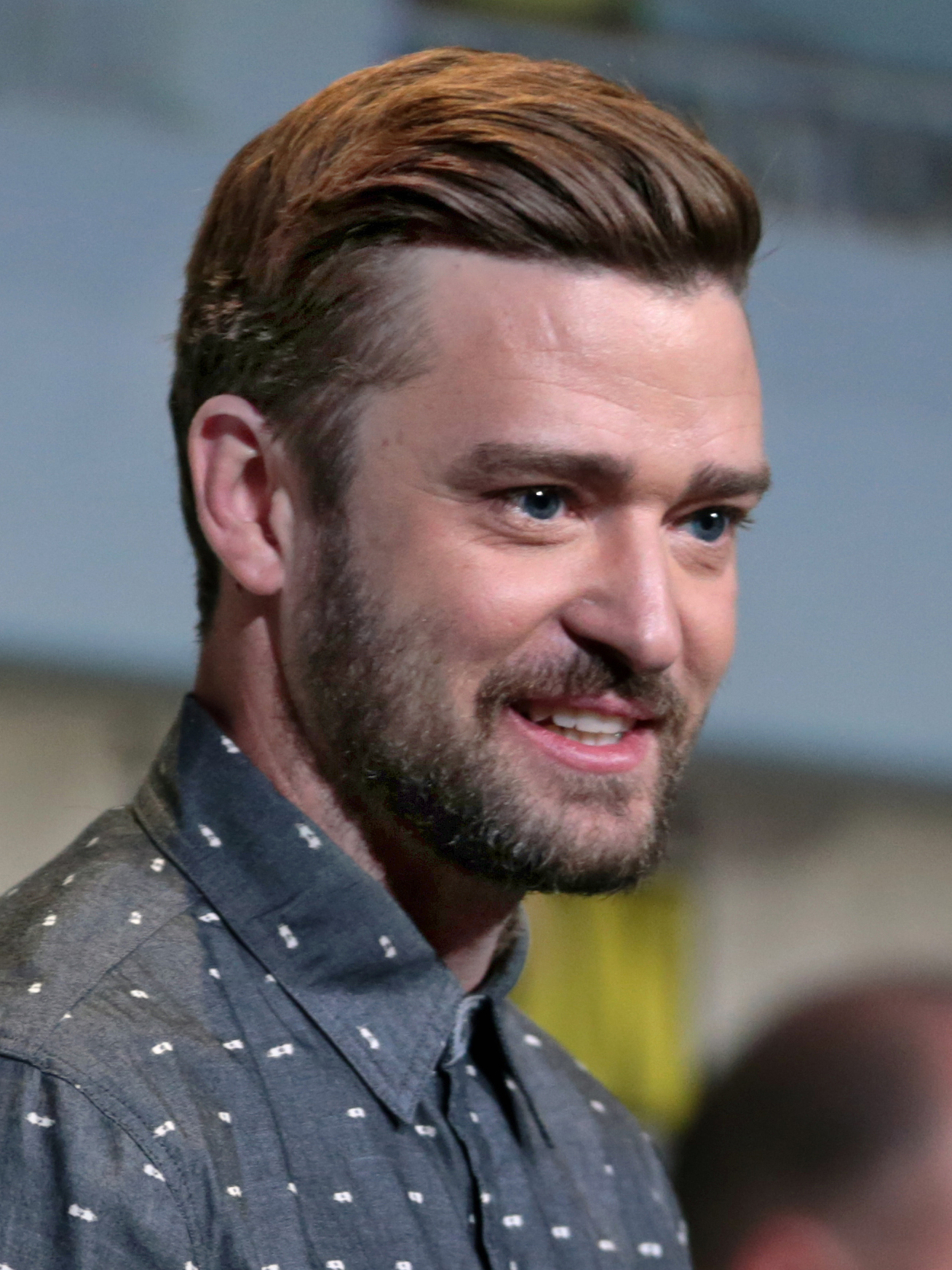
Justin Timberlake is featured in the song.

Rob Knox, one of the song's producers, expressed his feelings about creating the song:

We were like, this guy's going through a lot with his whole court case situation and his best friend dyin', and everything in the world kind of crumbling in front of him in a way. We [agreed that] it would be real cool and unexpected to give people something a little more heartfelt – not the club, party, typical record that everybody wanted. We even had a feeling that T.I. was gonna mention that, but we already had a plan for him.

"Dead and Gone" is a hip hop beat. In the song, T.I. deals with the death of his best friend and former bodyguard, Philant Johnson, who was killed on May 3, 2006, when T.I.'s crew was caught up in a shooting after a show in Cincinnati that left three injured and Johnson dead. The lyrics include lines such as: "Whoever thought I'd never see Philant no more," and "Big Phil this is for you." Johnson's tombstone is shown in the video.

There are two radio edits. One with the intro and outro cut off, and the explicit words being censored. Another edit, had cut the intro, the first chorus from Justin Timberlake, and the outro of the song, as well as replaced explicit words with less-offensive words. "Dead And Gone" is set in common time with a tempo of 84 beats per minute and is set in the key of A minor, with a chord sequence of Am-C-G-F-E.

== Release ==
The song was first confirmed as the next single by co-producer Rob Knox. T.I. later confirmed the release of the single himself. Song was first made available to digital download on September 29, 2008. It was sent to US rhythmic and contemporary hit radio on January 12, 2009. On March 26, 2009 12-inch vinyl was released.

== Reception ==
Sputnikmusic was extremely positive in its review: "You can't help but not skip the track. "Dead and Gone", yet another Timberlake / T.I. track is bolstered by its impressive Timbaland beat [although he is not the producer of the song] and the fact that it ends the album on a very, very strong note."

Before the single was announced, the track debuted at number 76 on the Billboard Hot 100 due to high downloads as an album track. Following its official release as a single, the song made a re-entry on the chart at number 99 and was able to reach number two for five consecutive weeks. After reaching its peak, the following week it fell to the number four position and then to number 6. It is T.I.'s fourth consecutive top 5 hit on the Hot 100 from Paper Trail, and seventh of his career as a lead artist. On the Hot R&B/Hip-Hop Songs Billboard sub-chart it also reached number two. The song reached number one on the Billboard Hot Rap Tracks and the Hot 100 Airplay chart on the week of March 14, 2009. It also peaked at number nine on the Billboard Pop 100 Airplay chart and number three on the Billboard Pop 100 chart. It was the 10th best-selling digital single of 2009 in the United States.

In the United Kingdom, the song made a strong debut at number 30 on the UK Singles Chart, and the following week climbed to number 17 and peaked at number four. In Canada, it debuted at number 59 on the Canadian Hot 100 the same week it did as in the U.S., and after its physical release it made a re-entry at number 70 and has now peaked at number three. As of February 2018, the song has sold 3.5 million copies in the US.

== Music video ==
The video was directed by Chris Robinson and was filmed in the first week of February in Lancaster, California. It surfaced on the internet a few hours before the official release date on February 17. In it, T.I. is filmed driving through a desert landscape, interspersed with shots of Justin Timberlake standing alone in the desert or playing a piano. T.I. eventually drives up in a '67 Camaro SS and meets with Timberlake and they continue the song together as the camera circles around them. Shortly before the final rendition of the chorus, there is a break in the music and a brief montage of images, with the words "good", "evil", and "redemption", appears. As the song draws to a close, T.I. is seen returning to his car and driving off, leaving Timberlake standing alone once again in the dark, with his piano set ablaze in the background. The very end of the video shows T.I. getting out of the car and entering a prison whose gates close behind him. This is a cliffhanger that is resolved in "Remember Me".

The video ranked at number 34 on BET's Notarized: Top 100 Videos of 2009 countdown.

The music video on YouTube has received over 140 million views as of April 2024.

== Track listings ==
Digital single

1. "Dead and Gone" (feat. Justin Timberlake) – 4:59

12-inch vinyl

1. "Dead and Gone" (feat. Justin Timberlake) [Radio Version] – 3:53
2. "Dead and Gone" (feat. Justin Timberlake) [Amended Album Version] – 4:59
3. "Dead and Gone" (feat. Justin Timberlake) [Explicit Album Version] – 4:59
4. "Dead and Gone" (Instrumental) – 4:59

== Charts ==
=== Weekly charts ===
Chart (2009)	Peak position
Australia (ARIA)	4
Austria (Ö3 Austria Top 40)	11
Belgium (Ultratop 50 Flanders)	28
Canada Hot 100 (Billboard)	3
Denmark (Tracklisten)	11
Finland (Suomen virallinen lista)	12
Germany (GfK)	7
Ireland (IRMA)	3
Netherlands (Dutch Top 40)	22
Netherlands (Single Top 100)	20
New Zealand (Recorded Music NZ)	2
Norway (VG-lista)	8
Romania (Romanian Top 100)	7
Romania Airplay (Media Forest)	4
Russia Airplay (TopHit)	3
Sweden (Sverigetopplistan)	20
Switzerland (Schweizer Hitparade)	18
Turkey (Türkiye Top 20)	3
UK Singles (Official Charts)	4
UK Airplay (Music Week)	8
UK Hip Hop/R&B (Official Charts)	1
US Billboard Hot 100	2
US Billboard Pop 100	1
US Hot R&B/Hip-Hop Songs (Billboard)	2
US Hot Rap Songs (Billboard)	1
US Pop Airplay (Billboard)	4
US Rhythmic Airplay (Billboard)	1

=== Year-end charts ===
Chart (2009)	Position
Australia (ARIA)	36
Brazil (Crowley)	74
Canada (Canadian Hot 100)	25
Germany (Official German Charts)	80
New Zealand (Recorded Music NZ)	21
Russia Airplay (TopHit)	75
Sweden (Sverigetopplistan)	68
UK Singles (Official Charts Company)	47
US Billboard Hot 100	12
US Hot R&B/Hip-Hop Songs (Billboard)	30
US Mainstream Top 40 (Billboard)	23
US Rhythmic (Billboard)	4

== Certifications ==
Region	Certification	Certified units/sales
Australia (ARIA)	Platinum	70,000^{^}
New Zealand (RMNZ)	Platinum	15,000^{*}
United Kingdom (BPI)	Platinum	600,000^{‡}
United States (RIAA)	5× Platinum	3,500,000
United States (RIAA) Mastertone	Gold	500,000^{^}
^{*} Sales figures based on certification alone.^{^} Shipments figures based on certification alone.^{‡} Sales+streaming figures based on certification alone.

== Release history ==
Release dates and formats for "Dead and Gone"
Region	Date	Format	Version	Label	Ref.
Various	September 29, 2008	Digital download	Original; Explicit	Grand Hustle	
United States	January 12, 2009	Contemporary hit radio	Radio edit	Grand Hustle; Atlantic	
United States	January 12, 2009	Rhythmic radio	Radio edit	Grand Hustle; Atlantic	
Various	March 26, 2009	12-inch vinyl	Original	Atlantic	

== Covers and parodies ==
- "Dead and Gone" – Travis Garland – This version was produced in January 2009 by Nicholas "RAS" Furlong, and written and performed by boy band NLT member Travis Garland. It was released in March 2009.
- "Dead and Gone" – Metro Station
- "Dead and Gone" – Cute Is What We Aim For – Released on Punk Goes Pop 3.
- "Things Gotta Change" – Avery Storm
- "I Don't Like White People" – Rucka Rucka Ali – This version was produced in 2009 and released for purchase in September 2010, this version was released on Rucka Rucka Ali's album I'm Black, You're White & These Are Clearly Parodies.

== See also ==
- List of Billboard Hot 100 top-ten singles in 2009
- List of UK R&B Singles Chart number ones of 2009
