= More Myself =

2020 book by Alicia Keys

More Myself: A Journey
- Author: Alicia Keys; Michelle Burford
- Language: English
- Publisher: Flatiron Books
- Publication date: March 31, 2020
- Publication place: United States
- Pages: 272
- ISBN: 9781529046045

More Myself: A Journey is a book by American recording artist Alicia Keys, written with the assistance of writer Michelle Burford. The book is the first release on Oprah Winfrey's imprint An Oprah Book. The book appeared at number three on The New York Times Best Seller list for Hardcover Nonfiction and at number four for Combined Print & E-Book Nonfiction. It also appeared at number seven on Publishers Weekly's list of the best selling Hardcover Frontlist Nonfiction books. In 2021, the book won the Audie Award for Best Narration by Author, while also being nominated for Best Audiobook.

== Background and release ==
Keys and Oprah Winfrey announced the book on 30 March 2019 on their respective social media accounts. Described as "part autobiography, part narrative documentary", Keys expressed much excitement at the announcement of the book's release about both the book and getting to release it through her friend's (Oprah's) imprint. The book was originally slated to be released on November 5, 2019. The audiobook version narrated by Keys, includes introductions and vignettes by Oprah Winfrey, Bono, Swizz Beatz, Jay Z and Michelle Obama, as well as original music by Keys. The memoir in combination with her album Alicia (2020) were described by Keys as "the best therapy I ever had" Keys stated that the book and album are "similar in this exploration, in the concept, in the conversation about identity, and what makes us up to be who we are".

== Promotion ==
In October 2019, Keys appeared on Jimmy Kimmel Live! to promote the book and said "I'm definitely looking and I've been on a journey to discover more of who I am and how to be more authentically who I am without kind of worrying about what other people think". In an interview with CBS News Sunday Morning in March 2020, Keys stated that journey to knowing herself has been a struggle for her, saying that "the craziest part is that I didn't know that I didn't know myself". Keys also revealed that her mother considered abortion after getting pregnant. In April 2020, Keys appeared on The Late Show with Stephen Colbert via video call to discuss the book. Keys appeared on El Hormiguero to promote the Spanish version of the book, More Myself: Mi Viaje, on June 10, 2021.

== Release history ==
Region	Date	Format	Publisher
Australia	March 30, 2020	Hardcover, eBook	MacMillan
Brazil	March 30, 2020	eBook	Flatiron Books
Spain	June 16, 2021	Hardcover	Ediciones Camelot
Sweden	April 4, 2020	Hardcover	MacMillan
United States	March 30, 2020	Hardcover	Flatiron Books
