= IHeart Living Room Concert for America =

COVID-19 pandemic benefit concert

iHeart Living Room Concert for America
- Presented by: Elton John
- Starring: Alicia Keys; Backstreet Boys; Billie Joe Armstrong; Billie Eilish; Finneas O'Connell; Camila Cabello; Shawn Mendes; Tim McGraw; Dave Grohl; Sam Smith; H.E.R. Demi Lovato; Mariah Carey
- Country of origin: United States
- Original language: English

Production
- Executive producers: Joel Gallen; Rob Wade; John Sykes; Tom Poleman
- Camera setup: Videotelephony

Original release
- Network: Fox iHeartRadio
- Release: 29 March 2020

The iHeart Living Room Concert for America was a concert special held on March 29, 2020, by iHeartMedia in response to the COVID-19 pandemic; to provide relief and support to the public in an effort to combat the spread of COVID-19. The special aired on Fox and was simulcast across their sister cable networks, along with a number of iHeartRadio broadcast radio stations and within its mobile app.

== Overview ==
The concert was hosted by Elton John, and it served as a partial replacement for the original timeslot for the 2020 iHeartRadio Music Awards, which was initially delayed to a later date and later cancelled due to the COVID-19 pandemic. It also served as a benefit for Feeding America and the First Responders Children's Foundation. The entire production utilized video conferencing and video apps from each artist and band who appeared to compile the special.

John, himself, volunteered to host the special, despite not having a piano in his Los Angeles home. Originally, Fox and iHeart were in talks with an undisclosed comedian to host the special, but it fell through.

It initially saw donations of nearly $8 million (and counting) raised for the charities. This was credited from not only numerous fan contributions, but also $500,000 from corporate partner Procter & Gamble, which Fox matched, and also additional funds raised by Fox employees and corporate partner PricewaterhouseCoopers. It was later reported that special eventually raised more $10 million for the charities as well.

== Performances ==
Performers and performances on iHeart Living Room Concert for America
Artist(s)	Song(s)
Alicia Keys	"Underdog"
Backstreet Boys	"I Want It That Way"
Billie Joe Armstrong	"Boulevard of Broken Dreams"
Billie Eilish; Finneas O'Connell	"Bad Guy"
Camila Cabello; Shawn Mendes (on guitar)	"My Oh My"
Tim McGraw	"Something Like That"
Dave Grohl	"My Hero"
Sam Smith	"How Do You Sleep?"
H.E.R.	"Keep Holding On"
Demi Lovato	"Skyscraper"
Mariah Carey	"Always Be My Baby"
Elton John	"Don't Let the Sun Go Down on Me"

== Appearances ==
- Melissa McCarthy and Ben Falcone
- Ellen DeGeneres
- Ryan Seacrest
- Lady Gaga
- Lizzo
- Ciara and Russell Wilson

== Broadcast ==
The special was broadcast at 9pm EST on Fox and was simulcast on Fox Corporation-owned networks Fox News, Fox Business, Fox Sports 2, and Fox Deportes. It was also broadcast on a majority of iHeartRadio broadcast radio stations, including its mobile app.

In Canada, the special was simulcast on Much, MTV, and CP24, wherein its broadcast benefits the Canadian Red Cross.

On Fox, the special scored 5.5 million viewers. It also scored 1.5 in the key 18-49 ratings demographic, beating American Idol as most watched show for the evening in this demographic. Overall, the special scored 8.7 million viewers.

== See also ==
- Impact of the COVID-19 pandemic on the music industry
- Stronger Together, Tous Ensemble
- Together at Home
