= Our Culture Mag =

British arts and culture online magazine

Our Culture
- Website type: Arts & culture magazine
- Available in: English
- Headquarters: Cambridge, England
- Editor: Modestas Mankus
- Website: ourculturemag.com
- Commercial: Yes
- Registration: None
- Launched: 2016; 10 years ago
- Current status: Active

Our Culture Mag (stylised ourculture) is a British arts and culture online magazine launched in 2016 by Modestas Mankus, based in Cambridge, England. It covers film, fashion, music, art, photography and literature.

== History ==
In 2016, Modestas Mankus launched Our Culture Mag, an online magazine covering latest news in the world of underground and mainstream music. In April 2017, the website announced that will cover film, art, and fashion. In October 2017, Our Culture Mag began covering gaming. The magazine has interviewed creatives in the music industry, such as Arlo Parks, Jonas Blue and Martin Solveig, and in film, such as Jonas Mekas, and Andy Nyman.

In January 2019, Our Culture Mag announced the launch of their affiliate website OC Lifestyle. The website's purpose was to replace Pay-per-click advertisement and to enhance the experience behind Our Culture Mag. In February 2019, Our Culture Mag launched Filmland, a forum that allows British filmmakers, film fanatics and critics to discuss film. Filmland became defunct in January 2020.

In 2020, Our Culture Mag partnered with Mercedes-Benz Fashion Week Russia as their media partner.

In February 2025, Our Culture Mag launched their sister site Dusty Mag.
