= Jungle City Studios =

Recording studios

Coordinates: 40.750521°N 74.003656°W

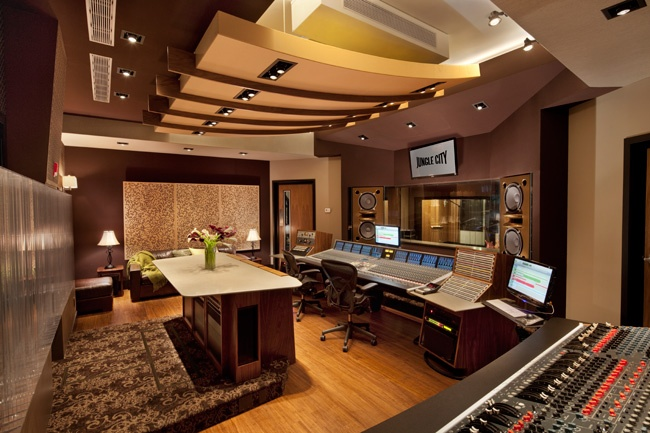
- Type: Recording studio
- Industry: Music
- Founded: 2011
- Headquarters: 520 West 27th Street, New York City, New York, U.S.
- Owner: Ann Mincieli
- Website: www.junglecitystudios.com

Jungle City Studios is a recording studio owned and operated by Ann Mincieli, Alicia Keys's longtime engineer and studio coordinator. Located in Chelsea, Manhattan, it was designed by John Storyk of Walters-Storyk Design Group.

== Recordings at Jungle City Studios ==
- Beyoncé – 4 (2011)
- Professor Green – At Your Inconvenience (2011)
- Cher Lloyd – Sticks and Stones (2011)
- Rihanna – Talk That Talk (2011)
- Emeli Sandé – Our Version of Events (2012)
- fun. – Some Nights (2012)
- Nas – Life Is Good (2012)
- Rick Ross – God Forgives, I Don't (2012)
- DJ Khaled – Kiss the Ring (2012)
- Alicia Keys – Girl on Fire (2012)
- Justin Timberlake – The 20/20 Experience (2013)
- Depeche Mode – Delta Machine (2013)
- Kelly Rowland – Talk a Good Game (2013)
- Robin Thicke – Blurred Lines (2013)
- Justin Timberlake – The 20/20 Experience – 2 of 2 (2013)
- Jay-Z – Magna Carta Holy Grail (2013)
- Pusha T – My Name Is My Name (2013)
- M.I.A. – Matangi (2013)
- Beyoncé – Beyoncé (2013)
- Pharrell Williams – Girl (2014)
- Iggy Azalea – The New Classic (2014)
- Mariah Carey – Me. I Am Mariah... The Elusive Chanteuse (2014)
- Irma – Faces (2014)
- Jon Bellion – The Definition (2014)
- Ed Sheeran – x (2014)
- Michael Jackson – "A Place with No Name" (2014)
- Nicki Minaj – The Pinkprint (2014)
- J. Cole – 2014 Forest Hills Drive (2014)
- Taylor Swift – 1989 (2014)
- Justin Bieber – Purpose (2015)
- Beyoncé – Lemonade (2016)
- Rihanna – Anti (2016)
- Zayn – Mind of Mine (2016)
- Alicia Keys – Here (2016)
- Kendrick Lamar – Damn (2017)
- Lorde – Melodrama (2017)
- Demi Lovato – Tell Me You Love Me (2017)
- Nicki Minaj – Queen (2018)
- Ariana Grande – Thank U, Next (2019)
- Roddy Ricch – The Box (2019)
- NCT 127 – We Are Superhuman (2019)
- The Weeknd – After Hours (2020)
- Alicia Keys – Alicia (2020)
- Ariana Grande – Positions (2020)
- Sabrina Carpenter – Emails I Can't Send (2022)
- Future – I Never Liked You (2022)
- Lil Uzi Vert – Pink Tape (2023)
- Ariana Grande – Eternal Sunshine (2024)
- Addison Rae – Addison (2025)
- Lil Uzi Vert – Maverick "Almost Forever" (2026)
- Ariana Grande – petal (2026)

== In popular culture ==
Lorde mentions the recording studio in her song "Hard Feelings/Loveless," which was recorded there. The lyric goes, "I'm at Jungle City / It's late and this song is for you."
