= Piano & I: A One Night Only Event with Alicia Keys =

2011 concert tour by Alicia Keys

Piano & I
- Promotional tour by Alicia Keys
- Promotional poster for the tour
- Associated album: Songs in A Minor: 10th Anniversary Edition
- Start date: June 11, 2011
- End date: June 30, 2011
- No. of shows: 5

Alicia Keys concert chronology
- Freedom Tour (2010); Piano & I (2011); Set the World on Fire Tour (2013)

Piano & I: A One Night Only Event with Alicia Keys, commonly referred to as Piano & I, was a promotional concert tour by American singer and songwriter Alicia Keys. The tour commemorated the tenth anniversary of Keys' debut album, Songs in A Minor (2001), which Keys re-released in late June 2011, with unreleased tracks, live performances, remixes and a documentary. The tour consisted of five concerts in Paris, London, New York City and Los Angeles. In addition to performing a number of songs from Songs in a Minor, Keys’ setlist included songs from all of her other studio albums as well as covers from DeBarge, Mary J. Blige and Marvin Gaye.

== Background ==
Keys announced the tour in April 2011 on her official website. In the blog post, the singer stated a deluxe and collector's edition of the "Songs in A Minor" re-release would be highlighted by two intimate concerts in London and New York City. Later in the month, Keys added Paris and Los Angeles to the agenda. The singer expresses her goal for the concerts was to provide the audience with the journey of her recording career. Each concert will be set in an intimate atmosphere, with only Keys and a piano on stage. The trek not only featured Keys original works but also covers of artists that have inspired her. Keys says the reason behind the show's setup was to reflect the early stages of her career, when she would perform for record executives with only a microphone and a keyboard. To introduce the promotional tour, Keys stated:

“I can’t think of a better way to celebrate the 10th anniversary of '[S]ongs in A [M]inor, than by holding a special, intimate concert for my fans. It’s my absolute favorite way to perform. There is something so special about just me on my piano connecting with the audience. It brings me back to the very beginning when I could only perform with a keyboard and to now be able to take it back to the essence of who I am with this show, it is so exciting".

== Critical reception ==
During the outing, Keys received high acclaim from music critics. Neil McCormick from The Telegraph rated the concert at Royal Albert Hall five stars. According to him, “before Lady Gaga and Adele, Alicia Keys set a new standard for the modern urban female star”. He wrote that the concert was “masterclass to her pop peers, a demonstration of how to match production pyrotechnics with the most elemental of musical tools, keyboard and voice, the art of the song. He further commented that “as the deep bass keys rang out and her hoarse, sweet voice climbed through the octaves to hit and hold the power notes, she was a picture of joyful concentration” and opined that Keys ”has proved she can vamp it up with the best, but this was a chance to really put the music before the business”. Will Hodgkinson from The Times and noted in his review that the Royal Albert Hall concert “was to highlight Keys’s continued status as a woman of distinction”. He further wrote that “from the chandeliers surrounding a grand piano to the two-hour solo set that Keys played on it, featuring much-loved classics alongside highlights from her own songbook, everything emphasised sophistication. Caragh Logan from Rewind Magazine reviewed Keys' Royal Albert Hall concert positively, writing "Seeing Alicia perform just about her entire body of work makes you realise what a consistent artist she is. Song after song, you are reminded why you own the entire Alicia Key[s'] album collection. Closing the show with 'Empire State of Mind', 'Sure Looks Good to Me' and 'No One', the audience were on their feet, lighters (and “cell phones”) in hand, belting out the songs with all our might". Matilda Egere- Cooper from The Independent described the show as “stunning” and noted that Keys “display[ed] the prowess of a truly remarkable virtuoso, rarely missing a note during her generous two-hour performance”.

The praise continued as the singer moved the concerts to the United States. According to Rolling Stone’s Steve Appleford, “Keys sang with authentic joy and anguish of romantic struggles, empowerment and long goodbyes” and “brought the weight of experience to her performances of A Minor ballads” at the concert in Pantages Theatre. Ben Wener from the Orange County Register noted that despite the intimate setting at the Pantages, Keys was still able to deliver a powerhouse performance. He continued, "To her credit, Keys has been deftly striking a balance between meaningful artistry and commercialism all along. Most everyone else in the game went the other way around: they started as mere entertainment, then dug deep so as not to be forgotten. Alicia was soul-deep to begin with, a virtuosic talent struggling to be heard, who then had to learn how to be an entertainer". For the show at the Beacon Theatre, Jim Farber from New York Daily News commented that Keys shines best in the "less is more" setting. He explained, "Here, with the piano once again her anchor, Keys was back in her element. The setup also provided the best way to showcase the sturdy bones of her melodies, as well as the purity of her vocals".

== Opening acts ==
- Tal (Paris – Grand Amphithéâtre)
- Emeli Sande (London – Royal Albert Hall)

== Setlist ==
1. "Raindrop Prelude"
2. "Blackbird"
3. "Stay with Me" / "A Dream" / "I Ain't Mad at Cha" / "Real Love"
4. "Never Felt This Way"
5. "Butterflyz"
6. "Trouble Man"
7. "Troubles"
8. "How Come You Don't Call Me"
9. "Goodbye"
10. "A Woman's Worth"
11. "Girlfriend"
12. "Why Do I Feel So Sad"
13. "Caged Bird"
14. "Moonlight Sonata"
15. "Fallin'"
16. "You Don't Know My Name"
17. "Diary"
18. "Karma"
19. "Unbreakable"
20. "Like You'll Never See Me Again"
21. "Try Sleeping with a Broken Heart"
22. "Un-Thinkable (I'm Ready)"
23. "If I Ain't Got You"
24. "New York State of Mind"
25. "Empire State of Mind (Part II) Broken Down"
  Encore
26. "Sure Looks Good to Me"
27. "No One"

Notes
- In addition, Keys performed “Superwoman” at Royal Albert Hall and Pantages.

== Tour dates ==
Date	City	Country	Venue
Europe
June 11, 2011	Paris	France	Grand Amphithéâtre
June 13, 2011	London	England	Royal Albert Hall
North America
June 24, 2011	Los Angeles	United States	Pantages Theatre
June 28, 2011	New York City	United States	Joe's Pub
June 30, 2011	New York City	United States	Beacon Theatre

=== Box office score data ===
Venue	City	Tickets sold / available	Gross revenue
Beacon Theatre	New York City	2,654 / 2,654 (100%)	$228,162

== Broadcasts and recordings ==
The promotional tour was filmed at the Beacon Theatre on June 30, 2011. The show was streamed live on AOL Music's Sessions +1. Keys was the first artist to be broadcast on this new programming. The special, entitled, Alicia Keys: AOL Music "Sessions +1" Concert in NYC, is available on AOL and VEVO.
