= Songs in A Minor Tour =

2002 concert tour by Alicia Keys

- Tour by Alicia Keys
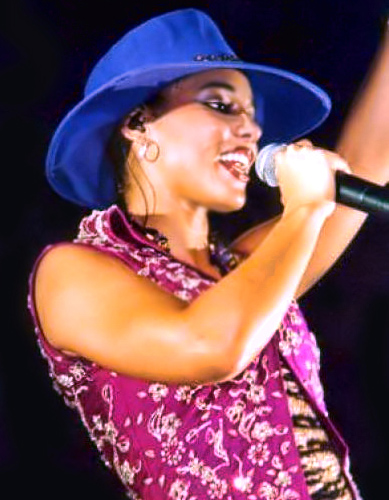
- Keys performing during her 2002 tour
- Associated album: Songs in A Minor
- Start date: January 22, 2002
- End date: August 30, 2002
- Legs: 2
- No. of shows: 58 in North America

Alicia Keys concert chronology
- Songs in A Minor Tour (2002); Verizon Ladies First Tour (2004)

The Songs in A Minor Tour was a concert tour by American singer and songwriter Alicia Keys set out in support of her debut studio album Songs in A Minor (2001). Dates for the tour in North America as well as Europe kicked off January 22, 2002 in Wallingford, Connecticut. During the first leg of the tour, Keys played mostly mid-sized venues. From August to October 2001, Keys toured alongside American singer and songwriter Maxwell in the United States. The tour concluded on August 30, 2002 in Virginia Beach, Virginia.

== Critical reception ==
In his review of Keys' concert at the Orpheum Theatre, James Sullivan from SFGate commented that Keys "has a self-confidence that's absolute" and "there's no doubt that Keys wants the spotlight". He further commented that "her voice is undeniably a beautiful thing" and found that during a performance of Fallin', Keys "found a powerful middle ground between her solo ruminations and her frenzied, scale-shredding vocal athleticism". In his review of the Massey Hall concert, Robert Everett-Green from The Globe and Mail wrote that Keys’ “material has changed in the shift from disc to stage, getting bigger and bolder at one end, and more intimate at the other” and “her stage presentation sought and found a path between the pink steel niceness of Mariah Carey and the blatant raunchiness of many women in urban music”. David Segal from The Washington Times was disappointed with the concert at DAR Constitution Hall, writing that Keys’ “intimate stylings were at times overwhelmed by the elaborate staging”. He found the concert “overproduced” and further opined that Keys “needs to undersell herself by keeping it simple and intimate rather than overpromised and extravagant”.

== Opening acts ==
- Musiq Soulchild (North America) (select venues)
- Donell Jones (North America)
- Glenn Lewis (Canada)

== Setlist ==
1. "Beethoven's 5th Symphony"
2. "Rock Wit U" (contains elements of "Juicy")
3. "The Life"
4. "How Come You Don't Call Me"
5. "Troubles"
6. "Challenge" (DJ vs Band)
7. "Moonlight Sonata" / "Aint Misbehavin"
8. "Piano and I"
9. "Goodbye"
10. "Never Felt This Way"
11. "Why Do I Feel So Sad"
12. "Butterflyz"
13. "Caged Bird"
14. "A Song For You"
15. "Someday We'll All Be Free"
16. "Fragile" [A]
17. Spanish Dance Segment [B]
18. "Mr. Man"
19. "Jane Doe"
20. "Shhh"
21. "A Woman's Worth"
22. "Light My Fire" [B]
23. "Girlfriend" (contains elements of "That Girl")
24. "Fallin'"

Notes

- A Only performed on first leg.
- B Only performed on second leg.

== Tour dates ==
| Date | City | Country | Venue |
First leg
| January 22, 2002 | Wallingford | United States | Oakdale Theatre |
| January 23, 2002 | Washington, D.C. | United States | DAR Constitution Hall |
| January 25, 2002 | Upper Darby Township | United States | Tower Theater |
| January 26, 2002 | Boston | United States | Orpheum Theatre |
| January 28, 2002 | Toronto | Canada | Massey Hall |
| January 29, 2002 | Detroit | United States | State Theatre |
| January 30, 2002 | Cleveland | United States | State Theatre |
| February 1, 2002 | New York City | United States | Radio City Music Hall |
| February 2, 2002 | New York City | United States | Radio City Music Hall |
| February 4, 2002 | Columbus | United States | Palace Theatre |
| February 5, 2002 | Milwaukee | United States | Riverside Theater |
| February 7, 2002 | Chicago | United States | Arie Crown Theater |
| February 8, 2002 | Chicago | United States | Arie Crown Theater |
| February 11, 2002 | Richmond | United States | Landmark Theatre |
| February 12, 2002 | Charlotte | United States | Ovens Auditorium |
| February 15, 2002 | Orlando | United States | Hard Rock Live |
| February 16, 2002 | Atlanta | United States | The Tabernacle |
| February 18, 2002 | New Orleans | United States | Saenger Theatre |
| February 19, 2002 | Houston | United States | Aerial Theatre |
| February 20, 2002 | Dallas | United States | Bronco Bowl |
| February 22, 2002 | Denver | United States | Fillmore Auditorium |
| February 28, 2002 | Los Angeles | United States | Wiltern Theatre |
| March 1, 2002 | Los Angeles | United States | Wiltern Theatre |
| March 3, 2002 | Oakland | United States | Paramount Theatre |
| March 4, 2002 | Oakland | United States | Paramount Theatre |
| March 6, 2002 | Tempe | United States | Gammage Auditorium |
| March 8, 2002 | Las Vegas | United States | Aladdin Theatre |
| March 10, 2002 | San Diego | United States | Copley Symphony Hall |
Second leg
| July 2, 2002 | New Orleans | United States | Louisiana Superdome |
| July 6, 2002 | Clarkston | United States | Pine Knob Music Theatre |
| July 8, 2002 | Toronto | Canada | Sears Theatre |
| July 10, 2002 | Boston | United States | Fleet Boston Pavilion |
| July 11, 2002 | Boston | United States | Fleet Boston Pavilion |
| July 13, 2002 | Uncasville | United States | Mohegan Sun Arena |
| July 16, 2002 | Holmdel | United States | PNC Bank Arts Center |
| July 17, 2002 | Wantagh | United States | Jones Beach Theater |
| July 19, 2002 | Camden | United States | Tweeter Center |
| July 20, 2002 | Atlantic City | United States | Etess Arena |
| July 22, 2002 | Atlanta | United States | Chastain Park Amphitheatre |
| July 24, 2002 | The Woodlands | United States | Cynthia Woods Mitchell Pavilion |
| July 26, 2002 | Tempe | United States | Gammage Auditorium |
| July 27, 2002 | Las Vegas | United States | Aladdin Theatre |
| July 30, 2002 | Los Angeles | United States | Greek Theatre |
| July 31, 2002 | Los Angeles | United States | Greek Theatre |
| August 1, 2002 (Note: This concert is part of California Mid-State Fair.) | Paso Robles | United States | Paso Robles Event Center |
| August 4, 2002 (Note: This concert is part of Summer Pops.) | San Diego | United States | Summer Pops at Navy Pier |
| August 5, 2002 | Santa Barbara | United States | Santa Barbara Bowl |
| August 7, 2002 | Sacramento | United States | Sacramento Memorial Auditorium |
| August 8, 2002 | Concord | United States | Chronicle Pavilion |
| August 10, 2002 | Seattle | United States | KeyArena |
| August 11, 2002 | Vancouver | Canada | General Motors Place Concert Bowl |
| August 12, 2002 | Portland | United States | Theater of the Clouds |
| August 16, 2002 (Note: This concert is part of Kentucky State Fair.) | Louisville | United States | Kentucky Exposition Center |
| August 17, 2002 (Note: This concert is part of Iowa State Fair.) | Des Moines | United States | Iowa State Fairgrounds |
| August 18, 2002 | Kansas City | United States | Starlight Theatre |
| August 20, 2002 | Memphis | United States | Orpheum Theatre |
| August 21, 2002 | Maryland Heights | United States | UMB Bank Pavilion |
| August 23, 2002 (Note: This concert is part of Minnesota State Fair.) | Saint Paul | United States | Minnesota State Fair Grandstand |
| August 25, 2002 (Note: This concert is part of Great New York State Fair.) | Syracuse | United States | New York State Fair Grandstand |
| August 27, 2002 (Note: This concert is part of Great Allentown Fair.) | Allentown | United States | Allentown Fairgrounds |
| August 29, 2002 | Columbia | United States | Merriweather Post Pavilion |
| August 30, 2002 (Note: This concert is part of American Music Festival.) | Virginia Beach | United States | American Music Festival |
United Kingdom
| October 23, 2002 | Nottingham | England | Nottingham Arena |
| October 24, 2002 | Manchester | England | Manchester Evening News Arena |
| October 30, 2002 | Cardiff | Wales | Cardiff International Arena |
| October 31, 2002 | Plymouth | England | Plymouth Pavilions |
| November 2, 2002 | London | England | Wembley Arena |
| November 3, 2002 | London | England | Wembley Arena |
| November 5, 2002 | Brighton | England | Brighton Centre |
| November 6, 2002 | Birmingham | England | Birmingham NEC |
