= Set the World on Fire Tour =

2013 concert tour by Alicia Keys

- Tour by Alicia Keys
- Promotional poster for the tour
- Associated album: Girl on Fire
- Start date: March 7, 2013
- End date: December 19, 2013
- Legs: 5
- No. of shows: 31 in North America; 30 in Europe; 9 in Oceania; 9 in Asia; 5 in South America; 83 total
- Box office: US $44 million ($60.81 in 2025 dollars)

Alicia Keys concert chronology
- Piano & I (2011); Set the World on Fire Tour (2013); Alicia + Keys World Tour (2022–2023)

The Set the World on Fire Tour was the fifth concert tour by American recording artist Alicia Keys to promote her fifth studio album, Girl on Fire (2012). The tour ranked 22nd on Pollstar's annual "Top 100 Worldwide Tours – Year End". It earned nearly $44 million from 70/74 shows.

== Background ==
Alicia Keys announced 6 UK and Ireland Arena dates following a performance on The X Factor. Tickets for the show went on sale on 23 November 2012 and almost immediately an extra date was added at The O2 Arena in London due to the high demand. The American leg of the tour was announced on 10 January 2013 and the pre-sale tickets went on sale on January 14. General sale tickets went on sale on January 18 and many of the dates sold-out within hours.

== Critical reception ==
In his review of the concert at Echo Arena in Liverpool, Ed Potton from The Times commented on Keys stage presence, writing "She can move, but her restrained shimmying contrasted with the exuberance of her dancers, like a slightly embarrassed older sister surrounded by her kid brother’s cheeky mates" but "that didn’t matter" on some songs, for example on "Fallin'", which Keys "finished with a one-woman vocal fanfare that brought the house down".

== Opening acts ==
- Miguel (North America, Europe) (select dates)
- John Legend (Australia)
- Bluey Robinson (Liverpool, Newcastle)
- André Henriques (Lisbon)
- Jason Derulo (Dubai)

== Setlists ==
=== North American setlist ===
This set list is representative of the concert in Montreal on April 3, 2013. It does not represent all concerts for the tour.

1. "Karma"
2. "You Don't Know My Name"
3. "Tears Always Win"
4. "Listen to Your Heart"
5. "Like You'll Never See Me Again"
6. "A Woman's Worth"
7. "Diary"
8. "Un-Thinkable (I'm Ready)"
9. "Try Sleeping with a Broken Heart"
10. "101"
11. "Fallin'"
12. "You're All I Need to Get By" (by background vocalists)
13. "When It's All Over"
14. "Limitedless"
15. "Fire We Make"
16. "Unbreakable"
17. "Brand New Me"
18. "If I Ain't Got You"
19. "No One"
20. "New Day"
21. "Girl on Fire"
  Encore
22. "Empire State of Mind (Part II) Broken Down"

=== New Zealand setlist ===
This set list is representative of the concert in Vector Arena on December 19, 2013.

1. "Karma"
2. "You Don't Know My Name"
3. "Tears Always Win"
4. "Listen to Your Heart"
5. "Like You'll Never See Me Again"
6. "A Woman's Worth"
7. "Diary"
8. "Un-Thinkable (I'm Ready)"
9. "Try Sleeping with a Broken Heart"
10. "Fallin'"
11. "You're All I Need to Get By"
12. "When It's All Over"
13. "Limitedless"
14. "Unbreakable"
15. "How Come U Don't Call Me Anymore?"
16. "Brand New Me"
17. "If I Ain't Got You"
18. "No One"
19. "New Day"
20. "Girl on Fire"
21. "Empire State of Mind"

=== Notes ===
- In Los Angeles, Keys performed "Any Time, Any Place" by Janet Jackson, before Kendrick Lamar came onstage to perform two songs.

== Tour dates ==
Date	City	Country	Venue
North America
March 7, 2013	Seattle	United States	WaMu Theater
March 8, 2013	Vancouver	Canada	Rogers Arena
March 10, 2013	Oakland	United States	Oracle Arena
March 12, 2013	Los Angeles	United States	Staples Center
March 13, 2013	San Diego	United States	Valley View Casino Center
March 15, 2013	Las Vegas	United States	Mandalay Bay Events Center
March 17, 2013	Grand Prairie	United States	Verizon Theatre at Grand Prairie
March 18, 2013	Houston	United States	Toyota Center
March 20, 2013	Cedar Park	United States	Cedar Park Center
March 21, 2013	New Orleans	United States	New Orleans Arena
March 23, 2013	Miami	United States	American Airlines Arena
March 24, 2013	Tampa	United States	Tampa Bay Times Forum
March 27, 2013	Cherokee	United States	Harrah's Cherokee Events Center
March 29, 2013	Atlanta	United States	Philips Arena
March 30, 2013	Greensboro	United States	Greensboro Coliseum
April 2, 2013	Toronto	Canada	Air Canada Centre
April 3, 2013	Montreal	Canada	Bell Centre
April 5, 2013	Brooklyn	United States	Barclays Center
April 6, 2013	Ledyard	United States	MGM Grand Theater
April 8, 2013	Newark	United States	Prudential Center
April 10, 2013	Boston	United States	Agganis Arena
April 11, 2013	New York City	United States	Madison Square Garden
April 13, 2013	Atlantic City	United States	Ovation Hall
April 14, 2013	Washington, D.C.	United States	Verizon Center
April 17, 2013	Detroit	United States	Joe Louis Arena
April 18, 2013	Chicago	United States	United Center
April 20, 2013^{[A]}	Nassau	The Bahamas	Imperial Ballroom
Europe
May 18, 2013	Liverpool	England	Echo Arena Liverpool
May 19, 2013	Newcastle	England	Metro Radio Arena
May 21, 2013	Belfast	Northern Ireland	Odyssey Arena
May 22, 2013	Dublin	Ireland	The O_{2}
May 24, 2013	Manchester	England	Manchester Arena
May 25, 2013	Birmingham	England	National Indoor Arena
May 28, 2013	Nottingham	England	Capital FM Arena Nottingham
May 30, 2013	London	England	The O_{2} Arena
May 31, 2013	London	England	The O_{2} Arena
June 2, 2013	Esch-sur-Alzette	Luxembourg	Rockhal
June 4, 2013	Frankfurt	Germany	Festhalle Frankfurt
June 5, 2013	Cologne	Germany	Lanxess Arena
June 7, 2013	Amsterdam	Netherlands	Ziggo Dome
June 8, 2013	Antwerp	Belgium	Sportpaleis
June 10, 2013	Hamburg	Germany	O_{2} World Hamburg
June 12, 2013	Prague	Czech Republic	O_{2} Arena
June 13, 2013	Vienna	Austria	Wiener Stadthalle
June 15, 2013	Zürich	Switzerland	Hallenstadion
June 16, 2013	Munich	Germany	Olympiahalle
June 18, 2013	Lyon	France	Halle Tony Garnier
June 19, 2013	Turin	Italy	Torino Palasport Olimpico
June 21, 2013	Monte Carlo	Monaco	Salle des Étoiles
June 22, 2013	Marseille	France	Le Dôme de Marseille
June 24, 2013	Paris	France	Palais Omnisports de Paris-Bercy
June 25, 2013	Paris	France	Palais Omnisports de Paris-Bercy
June 28, 2013	Lisbon	Portugal	MEO Arena
June 30, 2013	Poznań	Poland	Inea Stadion
July 2, 2013^{[C]}	Istanbul	Turkey	Parkorman
Asia
July 4, 2013	Tel Aviv	Israel	Nokia Arena
Europe
August 9, 2013^{[D]}	Helsinki	Finland	Suvilahti
August 10, 2013^{[E]}	Gothenburg	Sweden	Slottsskogen
South America
September 12, 2013	São Paulo	Brazil	Espaço das Américas
September 15, 2013^{[G]}	Rio de Janeiro	Brazil	Parque dos Atletas
September 17, 2013	Porto Alegre	Brazil	Auditório Araújo Vianna
September 20, 2013	Buenos Aires	Argentina	Estadio G.E.B.A.
September 23, 2013	Santiago	Chile	Movistar Arena
Asia
November 15, 2013	Dubai	United Arab Emirates	Dubai Media City Amphitheatre
November 18, 2013	Yokohama	Japan	Yokohama Arena
November 20, 2013	Shanghai	China	Mercedes-Benz Arena
November 22, 2013	Macau	China	Venetian Theatre
November 23, 2013	Macau	China	Venetian Theatre
November 25, 2013	Pasay	Philippines	Mall of Asia Arena
November 27, 2013	Kuala Lumpur	Malaysia	Putra Indoor Stadium
November 29, 2013	Jakarta	Indonesia	Skeeno Hall
Oceania
December 5, 2013	Perth	Australia	Perth Arena
December 7, 2013^{[J]}	Yarra Valley	Australia	The Amphitheatre at Rochford
December 8, 2013	Melbourne	Australia	Rod Laver Arena
December 9, 2013	Adelaide	Australia	Adelaide Entertainment Centre
December 11, 2013	Sydney	Australia	Allphones Arena
December 13, 2013	Brisbane	Australia	Brisbane Entertainment Centre
December 14, 2013	Hunter Valley	Australia	Hope Estate Winery Amphitheatre
December 17, 2013	Sydney	Australia	Star Event Centre
December 19, 2013	Auckland	New Zealand	Vector Arena

Festivals and other miscellaneous performances
^{A} Atlantis Live

^{C} Istanbul International Jazz Festival
^{D} Flow Festival
^{E} Way Out West
^{G} Rock in Rio
^{J} A Day on the Green

Cancellations and rescheduled shows

March 27, 2013	Southaven, Mississippi	Lander's Center	Cancelled

=== Box office score data ===
Venue	City	Tickets sold / Available	Gross revenue
Oracle Arena	Oakland	11,536 / 13,372 (86%)	$845,959
Staples Center	Los Angeles	13,591 / 14,120 (96%)	$1,070,436
Verizon Theater at Grand Prairie	Grand Prairie	4,546 / 5,490 (83%)	$410,397
American Airlines Arena	Miami	8,748 / 9,220 (95%)	$654,450
Harrah's Cherokee Event Center	Cherokee	3,009 / 3,009 (100%)	$246,334
Philips Arena	Atlanta	8,785 / 12,219 (72%)	$592,200
Air Canada Centre	Toronto	10,535 / 11,500 (92%)	$969,297
Bell Centre	Montreal	6,806 / 7,580 (90%)	$619,397
Barclays Center	Brooklyn	14,061 / 14,061 (100%)	$1,103,800
Prudential Center	Newark	6,357 / 7,947 (80%)	$502,036
Agganis Arena	Boston	4,922 / 5,947 (83%)	$451,470
Verizon Center	Washington, D.C.	8,322 / 12,195 (68%)	$763,838
Manchester Arena	Manchester	8,830 / 10,993 (80%)	$556,639
The O_{2} Arena	London	27,441 / 31,780 (86%)	$1,741,330
O_{2} World Hamburg	Hamburg	8,945 / 9,542 (94%)	$717,439
Hallenstadion	Zurich	13,000 / 13,000 (100%)	$1,142,860
Espaço das Américas	São Paulo	2,050 / 2,700 (76%)	$307,233
Auditório Araújo Viana	Porto Alegre	1,617 / 2,600 (62%)	$155,729
Estadio G.E.B.A.	Buenos Aires	4,264 / 7,500 (57%)	$377,550
Perth Arena	Perth	7,753 / 7,951 (98%)	$940,827
Rod Laver Arena	Melbourne	9,806 / 9,806 (100%)	$1,074,190
Allphones Arena	Sydney	11,011 / 11,974 (92%)	$1,304,530
Brisbane Entertainment Centre	Brisbane	6,291 / 6,684 (94%)	$706,496
TOTAL		202,226 / 230,540 (88%)	$17,254,437

== Notes ==
1.Data from study is collected from all worldwide concerts held between January 1 and June 30, 2013. All monetary figures are based in U.S. dollars. All information is based upon extensive research conducted by Pollstar.
