= Now Tour =

Now Tour may refer to:

- Now Tour (Maxwell), a 2001-02 concert tour by Maxwell
- Now Tour (Shania Twain), a 2018 concert tour by Shania Twain
