= List of Dutch Top 40 number-one singles of 2001 =

These hits topped the Dutch Top 40 in 2001 (see 2001 in music).

Issue date	Artist	Song
6 January	LeAnn Rimes	"Can't Fight the Moonlight"
13 January	LeAnn Rimes	"Can't Fight the Moonlight"
20 January	Jennifer Lopez	"Love Don't Cost a Thing"
27 January	Jennifer Lopez	"Love Don't Cost a Thing"
3 February	Outkast	"Ms. Jackson"
10 February	Def Rhymz	"Puf" / "Schudden"
17 February	Def Rhymz	"Puf" / "Schudden"
24 February	Shaggy and Rikrok	"It Wasn't Me"
3 March	Shaggy and Rikrok	"It Wasn't Me"
10 March	Shaggy and Rikrok	"It Wasn't Me"
17 March	Shaggy and Rikrok	"It Wasn't Me"
24 March	Shaggy and Rikrok	"It Wasn't Me"
31 March	Shaggy and Rikrok	"It Wasn't Me"
7 April	Shaggy and Rikrok	"It Wasn't Me"
14 April	Starmaker	"Damn (I Think I Love You)"
21 April	Starmaker	"Damn (I Think I Love You)"
28 April	Starmaker	"Damn (I Think I Love You)"
5 May	Starmaker	"Damn (I Think I Love You)"
12 May	Starmaker	"Damn (I Think I Love You)"
19 May	One Day Fly	"I Wanna Be a One Day Fly"
26 May	One Day Fly	"I Wanna Be a One Day Fly"
2 June	One Day Fly	"I Wanna Be a One Day Fly"
9 June	One Day Fly	"I Wanna Be a One Day Fly"
16 June	Atomic Kitten	"Whole Again"
23 June	Shaggy and Rayvon	"Angel"
30 June	Shaggy and Rayvon	"Angel"
7 July	Shaggy and Rayvon	"Angel"
14 July	Shaggy and Rayvon	"Angel"
21 July	Shaggy and Rayvon	"Angel"
28 July	Shaggy and Rayvon	"Angel"
4 August	Shaggy and Rayvon	"Angel"
11 August	U2	"Elevation"
18 August	Herman Brood	"My Way"
25 August	Herman Brood	"My Way"
1 September	Dante Thomas	"Miss California"
8 September	Alicia Keys	"Fallin'"
15 September	Alicia Keys	"Fallin'"
22 September	Alicia Keys	"Fallin'"
29 September	Alicia Keys	"Fallin'"
6 October	Kylie Minogue	"Can't Get You Out of My Head"
13 October	Kylie Minogue	"Can't Get You Out of My Head"
20 October	Kylie Minogue	"Can't Get You Out of My Head"
27 October	Kylie Minogue	"Can't Get You Out of My Head"
3 November	Kylie Minogue	"Can't Get You Out of My Head"
10 November	Kylie Minogue	"Can't Get You Out of My Head"
17 November	De Poema's	"Zij maakt het verschil"
24 November	De Poema's	"Zij maakt het verschil"
1 December	Sita	"Happy"
8 December	Sita	"Happy"
15 December	Gigi d'Agostino	"L'amour toujours"
22 December	Gigi d'Agostino	"L'amour toujours"
29 December	Gigi d'Agostino	"L'amour toujours"

== See also ==
- 2001 in music
