= List of UK R&B Albums Chart number ones of 2001 =

The logo of the Official Charts Company, responsible for compiling all of the official music charts in the United Kingdom, including the R&B albums chart.

The UK R&B Chart is a weekly chart, first introduced in October 1994, that ranks the 40 biggest-selling singles and albums that are classified in the R&B genre in the United Kingdom. The chart is compiled by the Official Charts Company, and is based on sales of CDs, downloads, vinyl and other formats over the previous seven days.

The following are the number-one albums of 2001.

== Number-one albums ==
Issue date	Album	Artist(s)	Record label	Ref.
7 January	The Marshall Mathers LP	Eminem	Aftermath/Interscope/Shady	
14 January	The Marshall Mathers LP	Eminem	Aftermath/Interscope/Shady	
21 January	The Marshall Mathers LP	Eminem	Aftermath/Interscope/Shady	
28 January	J.Lo	Jennifer Lopez	Epic	
4 February	Stankonia	OutKast	LaFace/Arista	
11 February	Stankonia	OutKast	LaFace/Arista	
18 February	Stankonia	OutKast	LaFace/Arista	
25 February	The Marshall Mathers LP	Eminem	Aftermath/Interscope/Shady	
4 March	The Marshall Mathers LP	Eminem	Aftermath/Interscope/Shady	
11 March	Born to Do It	Craig David	Atlantic/Edel	
18 March	Born to Do It	Craig David	Atlantic/Edel	
25 March	Born to Do It	Craig David	Atlantic/Edel	
1 April	Westwood	Various Artists	Def Jam	
8 April	Save the Last Dance	Various Artists	Hollywood	
15 April	Save the Last Dance	Various Artists	Hollywood	
22 April	Save the Last Dance	Various Artists	Hollywood	
29 April	All for You	Janet Jackson	Virgin	
6 May	Survivor	Destiny's Child	Columbia	
13 May	Survivor	Destiny's Child	Columbia	
20 May	Survivor	Destiny's Child	Columbia	
27 May	Survivor	Destiny's Child	Columbia	
3 June	Survivor	Destiny's Child	Columbia	
10 June	Pure R&B 3	Various Artists	BMG/Sony/Telstar	
17 June	R&B Selector	Various Artists	Universal Music TV	
24 June	Devil's Night	D12	Shady/Interscope	
1 July	Devil's Night	D12	Shady/Interscope	
8 July	Devil's Night	D12	Shady/Interscope	
15 July	8701	Usher	Arista	
22 July	8701	Usher	Arista	
29 July	Survivor	Destiny's Child	Columbia	
5 August	Survivor	Destiny's Child	Columbia	
12 August	The Very Best of Prince	Prince	Warner Bros.	
19 August	The Very Best of Prince	Prince	Warner Bros.	
26 August	The Very Best of Prince	Prince	Warner Bros.	
2 September	Street Vibes 8	Various Artists	BMG/Sony/Telstar	
9 September	Street Vibes 8	Various Artists	BMG/Sony/Telstar	
16 September	Glitter	Mariah Carey	Virgin	
23 September	The Id	Macy Gray	Epic	
30 September	The Id	Macy Gray	Epic	
7 October	The Id	Macy Gray	Epic	
14 October	8701	Usher	Arista	
21 October	Pain Is Love	Ja Rule	Murder Inc./Def Jam	
28 October	Songs in A Minor	Alicia Keys	J	
4 November	Invincible	Michael Jackson	Epic	
11 November	Songs in A Minor	Alicia Keys	J	
18 November	Dreams Can Come True, Greatest Hits Vol. 1	Gabrielle	PolyGram	
25 November	Dreams Can Come True, Greatest Hits Vol. 1	Gabrielle	PolyGram	
2 December	Dreams Can Come True, Greatest Hits Vol. 1	Gabrielle	PolyGram	
9 December	Dreams Can Come True, Greatest Hits Vol. 1	Gabrielle	PolyGram	
16 December	Dreams Can Come True, Greatest Hits Vol. 1	Gabrielle	PolyGram	
23 December	Dreams Can Come True, Greatest Hits Vol. 1	Gabrielle	PolyGram	
30 December	Dreams Can Come True, Greatest Hits Vol. 1	Gabrielle	PolyGram	

== See also ==
- List of UK Albums Chart number ones of the 2010s
