= Songs in A Minor =

- Standard cover (Note: UK special edition cover features a photograph of Keys wearing a white top and black hat, against a white background; Remixed & Unplugged cover uses a similar photograph. 20th anniversary edition cover features a wide shot of the original cover's photograph.)

Studio album by Alicia Keys
- Released: June 26, 2001
- Recorded: 1998–2001
- Studios: Backroom (Glendale); Battery (New York); Doppler (Atlanta); The Hit Factory (New York); KrucialKeys (New York); Southside (Atlanta); Unique (New York)
- Genres: Neo soul; classical; R&B; soul; jazz
- Length: 63:04
- Label: J
- Producers: Alicia Keys; Kerry "Krucial" Brothers; Arden Altino; Miri Ben-Ari; Jimmy Cozier; Jermaine Dupri; Kandi; Brian McKnight

Alicia Keys chronology
Songs in A Minor (2001)	The Diary of Alicia Keys (2003)

Alternative cover
- Deluxe edition cover, in lenticular print (Note: On the physical deluxe edition cover, two photographs of Keys shift depending on the viewing angle. Digital deluxe edition cover solely displays the photograph from the original cover, with the purple tinting. Collector's edition cover features a silhouette of Keys' head, with Manhattan skyscrapers and piano keys painted over it.)

Singles from Songs in A Minor
- 1. "Fallin'" Released: March 28, 2001; 2. "A Woman's Worth" Released: October 2, 2001; 3. "How Come You Don't Call Me" Released: March 11, 2002; 4. "Girlfriend" Released: November 25, 2002

Songs in A Minor is the debut studio album by American singer-songwriter Alicia Keys. It was released on June 26, 2001, by J Records. A classically trained pianist, Keys wrote, arranged and produced the majority of the album herself, though she frequently worked with her then-partner Kerry "Krucial" Brothers. The efforts resulted in a neo soul record fusing contemporary classical music with R&B, soul, and jazz, alongside influences of hip-hop, blues, and gospel. Its lyrics focus on themes of love, perseverance, self-worth, survival, and introspection. Despite the album's polysemic title, only two of its tracks are composed in the key of A minor.

Keys began writing songs for her debut studio album in 1995, aged 14, before signing a record deal with Columbia Records in 1996. Dissatisfied with Columbia's attempts to control her artistry and diminish her own creative inputs, she began recording Songs in A Minor independently in 1998. Upon being presented with finished recordings, Columbia rejected them. Around that time, Keys met Clive Davis, founder and then-president of Arista Records, who was impressed with her and bought out her contract with Columbia to sign her at Arista. She later finished the album under J Records in 2001. Further collaborative efforts included those with Jermaine Dupri, Kandi Burruss, Brian McKnight, and Jimmy Cozier. Autobiographical allusions to past relationships and the album's tumultuous creation are also interspersed throughout its lyricism.

Upon release, Songs in A Minor received widespread critical acclaim, primarily for its musical style and Keys' artistic maturity, though its lyricism elicited criticism. A commercial success, it debuted at number one on the US Billboard 200, with first-week sales of 236,000 units. Though a sleeper hit internationally, it went on to become one of the best-selling albums of 2001 worldwide. At the 44th Annual Grammy Awards (2002), Keys tied Lauryn Hill's record for most awards won by a woman in a single night with five wins, including the Grammy Award for Best R&B Album. Songs in A Minor produced four singles, including the US Billboard Hot 100 number-one and worldwide hit "Fallin'", and the US top-10 hit "A Woman's Worth". To further promote the album, Keys embarked on her headlining debut Songs in A Minor Tour (2002).

Songs in A Minor is widely regarded as an idiosyncratic, yet influential, album of the early 2000s; numerous publications have included it among the best albums of its era. Its immediate critical acclaim went on to be sustained with retrospective commentaries, which unanimously emphasized the record's timeless quality. Furthermore, Songs in A Minor is credited with solidifying Keys as a viable and ubiquitous recording artist. Based on its "cultural, historical or aesthetic importance", the album was inducted into the 2022 class of the National Recording Registry in the Library of Congress. In 2020, the album was certified septuple platinum by the Recording Industry Association of America (RIAA), for combined sales and album-equivalent units of seven million in the US. As of 2011, it has sold over 12 million copies worldwide.

== Writing and recording ==
In 1995, then-14-year-old Alicia Keys, a classically trained pianist, began writing songs that would eventually constitute Songs in A Minor, with "Butterflyz" and "The Life" being among the first compositions. (Note: attributed to multiple sources) At the time, she was a member of the girl group EmBishion. She was noticed by vocal coach Conrad Robinson, who subsequently introduced her to his brother Jeff, who became her manager after the disbandment of EmBishion. Jeff Robinson and artists and repertoire (A&R) executive Peter Edge helped Keys assemble demo recordings and arrange showcases for record label executives. After a bidding war ensued between labels, Keys signed a record deal with Columbia Records and Jermaine Dupri's So So Def Recordings in 1996. Around that time, she began working with Kerry Brothers Jr. After graduating from the Professional Performing Arts School in 1997, aged 16, Keys was accepted into Columbia University; however, she dropped out after four weeks to pursue her music career. Keys had already recorded the Rodney Jerkins-produced "Little Drummer Girl" for Dupri's 12 Soulful Nights of Christmas (1996), and co-wrote and recorded "Dah Dee Dah (Sexy Thing)" for the soundtrack to the 1997 film Men in Black. However, she grew frustrated with recording sessions for Columbia, whose executives aimed to diminish her creative inputs, instead bringing established producers in order to construct her image into that of "the next teen pop idol". Brothers consequently advised Keys to purchase her own equipment and to record without Columbia's interference.

Keys began producing and recording Songs in A Minor herself in 1998, after moving out of her mother's apartment into an apartment in Harlem, where she recorded in her bedroom. Afterwards, Keys and Brothers moved into a house in Queens, transforming its basement into the KrucialKeys Studios. In the studio, Keys completed the record by the end of 1998. However, upon being presented with the demo, Columbia rejected it for lacking radio-friendly material. As she felt her creativity was being disrespected, Keys desired to terminate her contract with Columbia. Upset by the situation, she wrote "Troubles", retrospectively stating: "Everything that I said in the verses was exactly how I felt, and what was said in the chorus was what I felt like God would be saying to me. I almost wanted to call it 'Conversations with God'." According to Keys, as she wrote "Troubles", Songs in A Minor "started comin' together. Finally, I knew how to structure my feelings into something that made sense, something that can translate to people." Soon thereafter, Edge introduced Keys to Clive Davis, founder and then-president of Arista Records. Davis, who sensed a "special, unique" artist in Keys upon first hearing her, bought out her contract with Columbia, and Keys signed with Arista in early 1999. Keys was also able to keep her recordings created under Columbia.

As Davis encouraged Keys to take creative control over her career, she continued writing and recording songs for Songs in A Minor, also learning how to produce recordings by consulting with producers and audio engineers. While recording, Keys sought permission from Prince to cover his 1982 song "How Come U Don't Call Me Anymore?". Prince, notoriously reluctant to allow his songs to be covered and sampled by other artists, invited Keys to his estate Paisley Park. After Keys performed the song in front of Prince's close associates, he allowed her to cover the song, and the two established a rapport. As Songs in A Minor neared completion in 2000, Davis was ousted from Arista and founded a new record label, J Records. Keys consequently left Arista and signed a record deal with J, under which she completed the album by early 2001. A total of 32 tracks were recorded for Songs in A Minor, 16 of which made its final track listing. Apart from the KrucialKeys Studios, the album was also recorded at the Battery Studios, The Hit Factory and the Unique Recording Studios in New York, the Doppler Studios and Dupri's Southside Studios in Atlanta, and the Backroom Studios in Glendale, while a substantial number of tracks were mixed at the Electric Lady Studios and the Sony Music Studios in New York. The album was largely self-written, self-arranged and self-produced: Keys wrote 14 of the tracks and produced 15, some in collaboration with contributors such as Brothers, Dupri, Kandi Burruss, and Brian McKnight. Prior to its inclusion on the album, "Rock wit U" was featured on the soundtrack for Shaft (2000), while the eventual Japanese edition bonus track "Rear View Mirror" was included on the soundtrack for Dr. Dolittle 2 (2001).

== Musical style ==
"Fallin'"
Widely considered Keys' signature song, (Note: attributed to multiple sources) "Fallin'" is a gospel-influenced piano ballad. Russell Baillie of The New Zealand Herald and Barry Walters of Rolling Stone described Keys' vocal performance on the track as evocative of Aretha Franklin.

Songs in A Minor is a neo soul album with classical piano references and arpeggios, fusing contemporary classical music with R&B, soul and jazz. Influenced by classical music, traditional soul and East Coast hip hop, Keys described the record as a "fusion of my classical training, meshed with what I grew up listening to [...] things I've been exposed to and drawn from and my life experiences". She cited Frédéric Chopin as the primary classical influence, and Marvin Gaye, Earth, Wind & Fire, Curtis Mayfield, and Stevie Wonder as soul-R&B influences. Jane Stevenson of Jam! described the musical style as "old-school urban sounds and attitude set against a backdrop of classical piano". USA Today's Steve Jones wrote that Keys "taps into the blues, soul, jazz and even classical music to propel haunting melodies and hard-driving funk". John Mulvey of Dotmusic called the album "a gorgeous and ambitious melding of classic soul structures and values to hyper-modern production technique". Despite its title, only two tracks on Songs in A Minor are composed in the key of A minor—"Jane Doe" and "Mr. Man".

The record opens with "Piano & I", which begins with a rendition of Ludwig van Beethoven's Piano Sonata No. 14, before transitioning into a contemporary hip-hop beat. Hip-hop influences are further present on "Girlfriend", a new jack swing-infused R&B track sampling Ol' Dirty Bastard's "Brooklyn Zoo". Reflecting Prince's original counterpart, "How Come You Don't Call Me" incorporates a funk-influenced sound, as does "Jane Doe". Also a funk track, "Rock wit U" is based on an elaborate orchestral instrumentation, including strings and flute played by Isaac Hayes, (Note: Hayes composed and recorded the soundtrack to the 1971 film Shaft, whose 2000 sequel's soundtrack included "Rock wit U".) alongside bass, conga and snare drums, and light synths. Sonically containing "the urgency of a New York minute", "The Life" received comparisons to Curtis Mayfield's "Gimmie Your Love", as well as work of Sade. "Swirling" string-driven "Mr. Man" is a duet with Jimmy Cozier, and is infused with reggae and Latin music styles. The "stripped-down" interlude "Never Felt This Way" segues into the piano and acoustic guitar-driven ballad "Butterflyz". Meanwhile, "Fallin'" and "A Woman's Worth" explore traditional soul and gospel-influenced elements; the former contains a sample of James Brown's "It's a Man's Man's Man's World". Similarly, the closing hidden track "Lovin' U" is an organ-driven gospel-soul song influenced by the Supremes.

== Lyrical themes ==
Songs in A Minor explores lyrical themes such as love, perseverance, self-worth, survival, and introspection. Some songs, such as "Troubles" and "The Life", are autobiographical and contain allusions to Keys' tumultuous, yet stagnant, period at Columbia Records. "The Life" further discusses universal adversities: "'Cause when it rains, it pours, isn't life worth more? / I don't even know what I’m hustlin' for / You got to do what you gotta do just to make it through all the hard times that are gonna face you". On the spoken-word "Piano & I", Keys explicitly addresses difficulties of the creative process preceding Songs in A Minor. For "How Come You Don't Call Me", Keys was inspired by a previous long-term relationship. "Girlfriend" is a female protagonist's admission of jealousy of her partner's friendship with another woman, while the lyrics of "Jane Doe" condemn a woman attempting to seduce the protagonist's partner. Songs such as "Fallin'" lyrically describe vicissitudes of romantic relationships. "Troubles" follows a woman concerned over her partner's potentially illicit activities. Keys later revealed she wrote the song as a conversation with God, with the chorus representing what she perceived as God's answer to her apprehension.

Feminist-themed "A Woman's Worth" urges male listeners to show adequate affection and respect to their female partners. Keys felt inspired to write it after seeing a televised L'Oréal commercial using the slogan "Because I'm worth it". "Butterflyz" describes "the sweet ascent into love with childlike brevity", while its successor "Why Do I Feel So Sad" is contrarily a "clear-eyed meditation on familiarity of heartbreak". Songs in A Minor closes with "Caged Bird", which pays homage to Maya Angelou's autobiography I Know Why the Caged Bird Sings (1969), reinterpreting the book's theme to describe quelling isolation and denigration with music. "Caged Bird" is followed by the hidden track "Lovin' U", which sees Keys simultaneously feel enraptured and anxious over a committed relationship. Christian Ward of NME and Clover Hope of Pitchfork emphasized Keys' expressive vocal performance and ability to convey different emotional themes, despite singing in a restrained style. Keys demonstrates distinct "shades of fatigue" throughout "Fallin'", ranging from a "swelling" falsetto to a hoarse alto. On "How Come You Don't Call Me", she uses crescendoed ad-libs to convey despair, while singing in a "hauntingly" low register on "Rock wit U" to express feeling captivated by her love interest.

== Marketing and touring ==
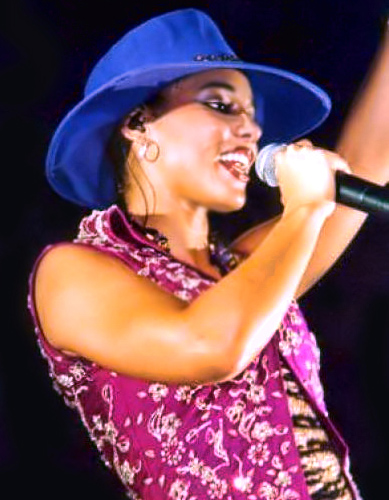
Keys during the Songs in A Minor Tour in 2002

Regarding the "grass-roots" marketing campaign for Songs in A Minor, J Records' then-executive vice president of A&R Jeff Edge remarked that it was based on exposing Keys "in terms of performing in front of people in every way possible, because it wasn't just about listening to her record—to see her was to believe in her". Originally titled Soul Stories in A Minor, the album was retitled to expand its marketability, and not to cater exclusively to R&B and hip-hop radio stations and retailers. In advance of the album's lead single, "Girlfriend" was serviced to urban contemporary radio as a promotional single in early 2001 to "introduce" Keys to the general public. Keys first performed "Fallin'" live at Davis' pre-43rd Annual Grammy Awards gala on February 20, 2001. "Fallin'" was released as the lead single from Songs in A Minor on March 28, going on to peak atop the US Billboard Hot 100, and becoming a worldwide top-10 hit and the second-best-performing single of 2001 in the US. Keys further promoted the album through print media, having been interviewed for the spring 2001 issue of The Fader, and photographed for the cover of the June 2001 issue of Dazed. Davis subsequently booked Keys for The Tonight Show with Jay Leno, and wrote a letter to Oprah Winfrey, persuading her to allow Keys to perform on The Oprah Winfrey Show. Winfrey agreed, and Keys performed on the show, alongside Yolanda Adams, India Arie, Mary Mary, and Jill Scott, on June 21. The performance led to the album's pre-orders to double.

Having been postponed from its original June 12 release at the last minute, Songs in A Minor was released on June 26, 2001, by J Records. (Note: Contemporary articles regarding Songs in A Minor in multiple publications, as well as the Recording Industry Association of America (RIAA), state June 26 as the album's release date. Multiple retrospective articles incorrectly state June 5 as the release date.) Although originally set for a June 11 international release, it would be progressively issued worldwide in subsequent months, starting with the UK on July 23. (Note: attributed to multiple sources) Despite "Jane Doe" receiving heavy unsolicited airplay, "A Woman's Worth" was released as the second single from Songs in A Minor on October 2, peaking at number seven on the Billboard Hot 100. Keys promoted the album with televised performances on Good Morning America on July 13, on Saturday Night Live on September 29, at the VH1/Vogue Fashion Awards on October 23, at the 2001 Billboard Music Awards on December 4, and on Last Call with Carson Daly on January 8, 2002. At the 2001 MTV Video Music Awards on September 6, 2001, she performed "Fallin'" while interpolating Ludwig van Beethoven's "Für Elise", later performing it as a medley with "A Woman's Worth", accompanied by flamenco dancer Joaquín Cortés, at the 44th Annual Grammy Awards on February 27, 2002. Internationally, Keys promoted the album by performing on Later... with Jools Holland in the UK on November 5, 2001, on Wetten, dass..? in Germany on November 17, and during the Sanremo Music Festival 2002 in Italy on March 8, 2002.

Having toured as a supporting act on Maxwell's Now Tour from August to October 2001, Keys embarked on her debut concert tour, the Songs in A Minor Tour, on January 22, 2002, initially touring North America until March 10. On March 11, "How Come You Don't Call Me" was released as the third single from Songs in A Minor, failing to replicate the success of its predecessors by peaking at number 59 on the Billboard Hot 100. Afterwards, Keys commenced Good Morning America's annual Summer Concert Series on May 31. The Songs in A Minor Tour resumed with the second North American leg on July 2. The August 10 concert at KeyArena in Seattle was partially recorded, and several live performances were included on the Remixed & Unplugged edition of Songs in A Minor, released in select countries in October. (Note: In select countries, Songs in A Minor was reissued to include a bonus disc of live performances and remixes, subtitled Remixed & Unplugged. In Japan, the bonus disc was released as the standalone Remixed & Unplugged in A Minor.) The tour was then expanded with a leg in Europe, from September to November 2002, and ended with an Oceanian leg in December. "Girlfriend" was released as the fourth and final single from Songs in A Minor outside North America on November 25, 2002, peaking at number 24 on the UK Singles Chart.

=== Anniversary projects ===
In April 2011, Keys announced plans to commemorate the 10th anniversary of Songs in A Minor, with reissues in multiple formats and Piano & I: A One Night Only Event with Alicia Keys, originally intended as a singular concert at the Beacon Theatre in New York City on June 30. In a statement, Keys said: "This album is possibly the most precious to me as your first album only happens once, and so Songs in A Minor will always hold a special place in my life that's filled with amazing memories. I'm so proud the songs are still being enjoyed, and I'm crazy excited to share songs never heard before." The concert was subsequently expanded into a promotional tour, with additional dates in Paris, London and Los Angeles during June. During the shows, Keys performed the album in its entirety and told stories of its recording.

Double-disc deluxe and box set collector's editions of Songs in A Minor were released on June 28, 2011. Both included previously unreleased material, while the collector's edition bonus DVD featured a documentary chronicling the making of the record. The original album was simultaneously made available on vinyl for the first time. Furthermore, Keys performed a medley of "Typewriter", "Fallin'", "A Woman's Worth" with Bruno Mars, and "Maybach Music" with Rick Ross at the BET Awards 2011 on June 26, as well as performing "Fallin'", "Butterflyz", and "Empire State of Mind (Part II) Broken Down" on Good Morning America on June 28, the same day a wax figure of her was unveiled at Madame Tussauds New York. BET aired The Story So Far, a special highlighting Keys' ten-year career through her BET performances and interviews, on June 29.

Songs in A Minor was reissued again on June 4, 2021, in commemoration of its 20th anniversary, including the previously unreleased "Foolish Heart" and "Crazy (Mi Corazon)". To promote the release, Keys performed a medley of "Piano & I", "A Woman's Worth", "How Come You Don't Call Me", and "Fallin'" at the 2021 Billboard Music Awards on May 23; the performance was introduced with a speech from Michelle Obama. Keys also appeared on the cover of the May 26, 2021 issue of Bustle, which featured a story on the creation of Songs in A Minor and its subsequent impact. Sony Music also launched an interactive website dedicated to fan letters regarding the album. For its 25th anniversary, the album was reissued in two limited-edition vinyl variants on June 26, 2026, including "Foolish Heart" and "Crazy (Mi Corazon)" as bonus tracks. Keys performed "Fallin'" with British singer-songwriter Raye, and "Lovin' U" with the top three contestants, on the season 24 finale of American Idol on May 11, 2026.

== Critical reception ==
=== Initial response ===
Initial professional ratings
Review scores
Source	Rating
E! Online	A
Entertainment Weekly	B
Los Angeles Times	3/4 stars
The New Zealand Herald	3/5 stars
NME	4.5/5 stars
Q	4/5 stars
Rolling Stone	3/5 stars
Slant Magazine	3.5/5 stars
USA Today	3.5/4 stars
The Village Voice	A−

On release, Songs in A Minor received widespread critical acclaim, with critics predominantly hailing it as an auspicious and accomplished debut. (Note: attributed to multiple sources) At Metacritic, which assigns a normalized rating out of 100 to reviews from mainstream critics, it received an average score of 78, based on 10 reviews. Reviewing the album for NME, Sam Faulkner described the balance between classical music and R&B as "an act of pure genius". Q praised Keys as "a prime candidate to head up the nu-soul revolution ... with a voice that challenges Mary J. Blige's", while Steve Jones of USA Today said that "Keys already has a musical, artistic and thematic maturity that many more experienced artists never achieve". The Washington Post's Richard Harrington shared those sentiments, further directing praise towards Keys' musical influences. In his review published via PopMatters, Mark Anthony Neal called the album "a distinct and oft-times brilliant debut from an artist who clearly has a fine sense of her creative talents". Robert Christgau, writing in The Village Voice, commended it for its first half and closing tracks, despite some "bores that threaten to sink the project midway through".

Keys' vocal performance was also lauded; (Note: attributed to multiple sources) Sal Cinquemani from Slant Magazine declared that Keys' displayed a "powerful range, proving she can belt along with the best of them". Uncut called the album "frequently stunning" and compared Keys' vocal performance to a young Aretha Franklin. However, some critics found Keys' lyricism to be subpar to her singing and musical abilities. The New Zealand Herald's Russell Baillie stated that Keys "might indicate abundant talent aligned to neatly reverential vintage soul style", but expressed that the songs "don't add up to anything particularly memorable". Beth Johnson of Entertainment Weekly called the second half of the album slacked with "sad sack teen themes", but called it a promising album. Rolling Stone's Barry Walters perceived her singing as more mature than her songwriting, but commended Keys for her "commanding presence" on the album. Los Angeles Times writer Robert Hilburn said that the album "makes a convincing case that's she's going far—in both a commercial and creative sense".

=== Retrospective commentary ===
Retrospective professional ratings
Aggregate scores
Source	Rating
Metacritic	78/100
Review scores
Source	Rating
AllMusic	5/5 stars
American Songwriter	4/5 stars
The Encyclopedia of Popular Music	4/5 stars
The Great Rock Discography	9/10 stars
Piero Scaruffi	7/10
Pitchfork	8.5/10
Rolling Stone	4/5 stars
The Rolling Stone Album Guide	3/5 stars
Tom Hull	A−

Critical plaudits for Songs in A Minor persevered in retrospective reviews, with numerous critics concurring that the record had aged well by its 10th anniversary. (Note: attributed to multiple sources) Accordingly, George Lang of The Oklahoman felt the 10th anniversary reissue was "oddly premature", while Barry Walters of Rolling Stone opined that "excepting a drum-machine beat or two, [the album] feels timeless". In a review for AllMusic, Stephen Thomas Erlewine further perceived the sonic quality as "rich enough to compensate for some thinness in the writing" and called the album "a startling assured, successful debut that deserved its immediate acclaim". In The Encyclopedia of Popular Music (2007), Colin Larkin called it an "exotic" fusion of urban R&B, hip hop, and blues on "a minor classic of modern soul". Lloyd Bradley, via BBC, hailed the record as "a masterpiece of contemporary soul songwriting and arrangement". Stephen Deusner wrote for American Songwriter that the original album's "resourceful musicality extends to the bonus tracks" on the collector's edition.

In 2016, Preezy of The Boombox praised Songs in A Minor for being a "phenomenal debut" and "quite sophisticated for a 20-year-old piano prodigy". Dissecting its structure, he concluded: "One positive of the deeper cuts on Songs in A Minor is that they reveal a bit of the woman sitting behind the piano, as opposed to showcasing her immense talent, a mission the opening tracks on the accomplished." Ahead of the 20th anniversary of Songs in A Minor, Clover Hope of Pitchfork also exalted it as an outstanding debut, and—despite dismissing tracks such as "Girlfriend" and "Jane Doe", which she perceived as thematically dated—she praised Keys' self-sufficient musicianship and "incredibly persuasive" vocal performance. Like Preezy, Justin Chadwick of the website Albumism noted a loss of consistency throughout the record's second half, but nonetheless declared the album a "masterfully executed hybrid of classic and contemporary soul with an acute streetwise sensibility to balance its creator's musical intelligence and passion".

== Accolades ==
=== Awards ===
Awards and nominations
Year	Award	Category	Result	Ref.
2001	My VH1 Music Award	Must Have Album	Nominated	
2001	Billboard Music Award	R&B/Hip-Hop Album of the Year	Nominated	
2001	Billboard Music Award	Female Albums Artist of the Year	Nominated	
2002	American Music Award	Favorite Soul/R&B Album	Nominated	
2002	Brit Award	International Album	Nominated	
2002	NAACP Image Award	Outstanding Album	Won	
2002	Edison Award	R&B/HipHop	Won	
2002	Grammy Award	Best R&B Album	Won	
2002	Soul Train Music Award	R&B/Soul or Rap Album of the Year	Nominated	
2002	Soul Train Music Award	Best R&B/Soul Album – Female	Won	
2002	Billboard R&B/Hip-Hop Award	Top R&B/Hip-Hop Album	Won	
2002	Teen Choice Award	Choice Music – Album	Nominated	
2002	Soul Train Lady of Soul Award	R&B/Soul Album of the Year – Solo	Won	
2002	MOBO Award	Best Album	Won	
2002	TEC Award	Outstanding Creative Achievement – Record Production/Album	Nominated	
2003	Brit Award	International Album	Nominated	
2003	Hungarian Music Award	Foreign Rap or Hip-Hop Album of the Year	Won	

=== Listings ===
Listings
Year	Publication	List	Position	Ref.
2001	Billboard	The Critics' Choice	3	
2001	Blender	The 50 Greatest Albums of 2001	7	
2001	Mojo	Best 40 Albums of 2001	27	
2001	Musikexpress	Kritiker Top 50	18	
2001	Oor	Jaarlijst	22	
2001	Q	The Best 50 Albums of 2001	—	
2001	Rolling Stone	Top 10 Albums of 2001	2	
2001	Slant Magazine	Top 10 Albums of 2001	(Note: While Songs in A Minor did not make the top 10, it was listed among honorable mentions.)	
2001	The Village Voice	Pazz & Jop	18	
2003	Q	100 Greatest Albums Ever	—	
2007	Vibe	150 Albums That Define the Vibe Era	—	
2009	Adresseavisen	100 Best Albums of the Decade	66	
2009	MTV Base; MTV Two; VH1	Greatest Albums Ever	26	
2009	Rolling Stone	100 Best Albums of the 2000s	95	
2012	Entertainment Weekly	The Best Albums Ever	57	
2013	Vibe	The Greatest 50 Albums Since '93	49	
2017	NPR	The 150 Greatest Albums Made by Women	149	
2019	The Guardian	The 100 Best Albums of the 21st Century	66	
2022	Rolling Stone	100 Best Debut Albums of All Time	46	

== Commercial performance ==
In the United States, Songs in A Minor sold more than 50,000 copies on its first day of release. It sold 236,000 copies in its first week, debuting atop the Billboard 200 and Top R&B/Hip-Hop Albums charts dated July 14, 2001; it thus became the first number-one for J Records on both charts. The number-one debut for then-new artist Keys in a highly competitive week was largely attributed to the critical acclaim the album received, the burgeoning performance of its lead single "Fallin'", and Keys' appearance on The Oprah Winfrey Show upon the album's release. Selling 174,000 units in its second week, the album descended to number two to Devil's Night by D12; the albums were separated by just 306 copies, a margin of 0.17 percent. Keys' performance on Good Morning America prompted Songs in A Minor to return to the summit in its third week, where it remained the following week for a final week atop the chart. On the Top R&B/Hip-Hop Albums, it spent six consecutive weeks at number one. The album registered its best-selling week during the holiday season of 2001, with sales of 241,000 units. It became the sixth best-selling album of 2001 in the US, selling 4,100,000 copies by the end of the year, having placed at number 13 on the Billboard 200 year-end chart. Following its 10th anniversary reissue in June 2011, the album re-entered the Billboard 200 at number 69; it has spent a total of 70 weeks on the chart. For combined sales and album-equivalent units amounting to seven million in the country, the album was certified septuple platinum by the Recording Industry Association of America (RIAA) in August 2020.

Internationally, Songs in A Minor was a sleeper hit. For over two months, it progressively ascended towards its peak of number two on the Canadian Albums Chart, and went on to be certified quintuple platinum by then-Canadian Recording Industry Association (CRIA) in July 2002, for shipments of 500,000 units in Canada. Across Europe, the album generally debuted at low positions but gradually reached the top 10 in 13 countries, peaking at number one in the Netherlands, within the top three in Germany and Switzerland, and at number five on the European Top 100 Albums. By selling three million copies in Europe, it earned a triple-platinum certification from the International Federation of the Phonographic Industry (IFPI) in 2004. Debuting at number 75 on the UK Albums Chart, the album peaked at number six in its 28th week on the chart, having spent two non-consecutive weeks atop the UK R&B Albums Chart. In November 2002, it was certified triple platinum by the British Phonographic Industry (BPI), for sales of 900,000 units in the UK. Songs in A Minor debuted at number 57 on the Australian Albums Chart, reaching its number-three peak six months later in March 2002. It was certified triple platinum by the Australian Recording Industry Association (ARIA) in 2019, for combined sales and album-equivalent units of 210,000 in Australia. Similarly, the album fluctuated within the New Zealand Albums Chart for six months before peaking at number four, being certified platinum by then-Recording Industry Association of New Zealand (RIANZ) in August 2002, for shipments of 15,000 units in the country. Songs in A Minor was the seventh best-selling album in the world of 2001, having sold 6,700,000 units by the end of the year. As of 2011, it has sold over 12 million copies worldwide. (Note: attributed to multiple sources)

== Legacy ==
"I'm so honored and grateful that 'Songs in A Minor,' the entire album, gets to be recognized as such a powerful body of work that is just going to be timeless. What is it about [the album] that I think resonates with everybody for so long? I just think it was so pure. People hadn't quite seen a woman in Timberlands and cornrows and really straight 100% off of the streets of New York performing classical music and mixing it with soul music and R&B. And people could find themselves in it. And I love that."

— Keys ahead of the induction of Songs in A Minor into the National Recording Registry in 2022

Released during the early-2000s period of heightened creativity in contemporary R&B and the upsurge of neo soul, Songs in A Minor is widely regarded as an idiosyncratic, yet influential, album of its era. (Note: attributed to multiple sources) According to J'na Jefferson in USA Today, it largely influenced subsequent contemporary R&B trends and "set the new millennium's artistic bar sky high". Numerous critics accentuated the record's distinction from 2001's pop music landscape, predominantly due to its earnest and sensible lyricism, and fusion of classical and modern musical styles. (Note: attributed to multiple sources) The self-produced Songs in A Minor was further placed in juxtaposition with more elaborately produced concurrent recordings of other R&B artists, largely produced by Timbaland, Rodney Jerkins, and Bryan-Michael Cox, such as Aaliyah's eponymous third and final studio album and Usher's 8701. Including Songs in A Minor on their listing of best debut albums of all time, Rolling Stone concluded: "In an increasingly digitized pop age, this album was a reminder that history still lived and talent still mattered." The Library of Congress selected the album for induction in the 2022 class of the National Recording Registry, based on its "cultural, historical or aesthetic importance".

In August 2001, Margena A. Christian of Jet classified Keys as one of the fastest-rising recording artists, while Touré regarded her as "the next queen of soul" in the November 8, 2001 issue of Rolling Stone's cover story. Upon the release of her second studio album The Diary of Alicia Keys (2003), Kris Ex of Blender declared Keys "the first new pop artist of the millennium who was capable of changing music", which he attributed to Songs in A Minor. A later Billboard article reflected on Songs in A Minor introducing Keys as "a different kind of pop singer. Not only was she mean on the ivories, but she showed true musicianship, writing and performing her material." Hope observed how its background and structure separated Keys from her contemporaries, namely Destiny's Child, Britney Spears, NSYNC, and Usher, and ultimately led to Keys being positioned at the forefront of popular music, alongside India Arie, as "new ambassadors of neo-soul". Gail Mitchell of Billboard shared those sentiments, adding that the album exhibited Keys' multifaceted talents. Stephen Thomas Erlewine further credited it for eliciting a rise of not only fellow neo soul musicians, but also "ambitious yet classicist" singers-songwriters of other genres—such as Nelly Furtado and Norah Jones—to ubiquitous prominence.

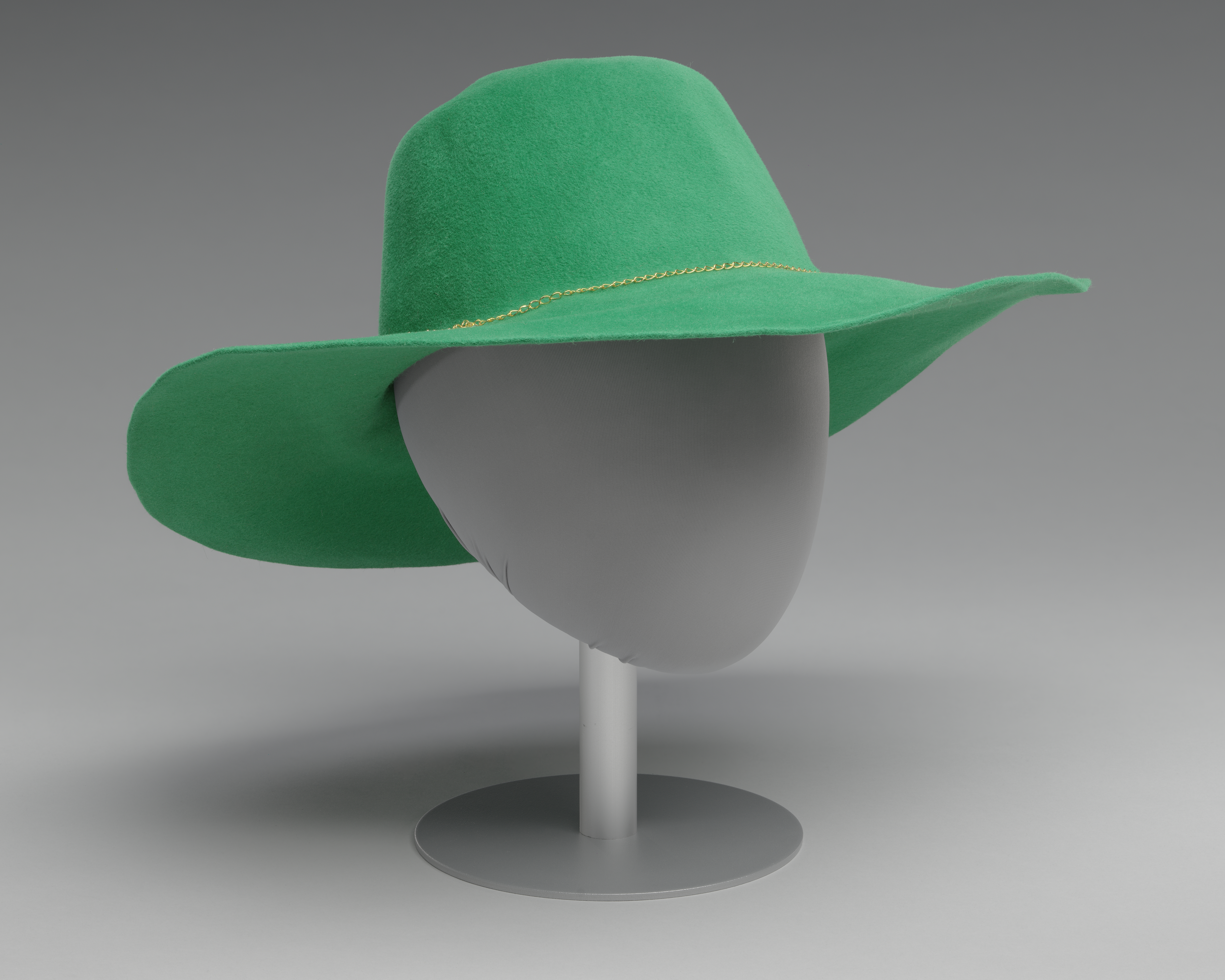
The hat Keys wore on the cover of Songs in A Minor is exhibited at the National Museum of African American History and Culture.

With five wins at the 44th Annual Grammy Awards, Keys tied Lauryn Hill's record of most Grammy Awards won by a woman at a single ceremony; the record would eventually be broken by Beyoncé, who won six awards at the 52nd Annual Grammy Awards (2010). Keys was also among the most nominated and awarded artists at numerous award ceremonies between 2001–2002, including the American Music Awards, the Billboard Music Awards, and the Soul Train Music Awards. In an essay published by the Library of Congress, author Jene Roswell emphasized the significance of Keys' record-breaking Grammy Award wins and performance on the 2001 Billboard Year-End charts with her debut effort, as those achievements helped her solidify her status among leading recording artists of the time. Songs in A Minor was thus credited with setting high expectations for The Diary of Alicia Keys, regarding both artistic merit and commercial performance. However, the latter exceeded first-week sales of the former, becoming Keys' second consecutive Billboard 200 number-one entry with 618,000 units sold, and won Keys her second Best R&B Album award at the 47th Annual Grammy Awards (2005).

== Track listing ==
Songs in A Minor
No.	Title	Writer(s)	Producer(s)	Length
1.	"Piano & I"	Alicia Keys	Keys; Kerry "Krucial" Brothers	1:51
2.	"Girlfriend"	Keys; Jermaine Dupri; Joshua Thompson	Keys; Dupri	3:34
3.	"How Come You Don't Call Me"	Prince	Keys; Brothers	3:57
4.	"Fallin'"	Keys	Keys	3:30
5.	"Troubles"	Keys; Kerry Brothers Jr.	Keys; Brothers^{[a]}	4:28
6.	"Rock wit U"	Keys; Taneisha Smith; Brothers	Keys; Brothers	5:36
7.	"A Woman's Worth"	Keys; Erika Rose	Keys	5:03
8.	"Jane Doe"	Keys; Kandi Burruss	Keys; Kandi	3:48
9.	"Goodbye"	Keys	Brian McKnight	4:20
10.	"The Life"	Keys; Smith; Brothers	Keys; Brothers^{[a]}	5:25
11.	"Mr. Man" (with Jimmy Cozier)	Keys; Cozier	Keys; Cozier; Arden Altino; Miri Ben-Ari	4:09
12.	"Never Felt This Way" (Interlude)	McKnight; Brandon Barnes	Keys	2:00
13.	"Butterflyz"	Keys	Keys	4:08
14.	"Why Do I Feel So Sad"	Keys; Warryn Campbell	Keys; Brothers	4:25
15.	"Caged Bird"	Keys	Keys	3:02
16.	"Lovin U" (hidden track)	Keys	Keys	3:48
Total length:				63:04

Japanese editions
No.	Title	Writer(s)	Producer(s)	Length
17.	"Rear View Mirror"	Keys; LaShawn Daniels; Brothers; Fred Jerkins III; Rodney Jerkins; Green	Keys; Brothers	4:06
Total length:				67:07

Deluxe edition
No.	Title	Writer(s)	Producer(s)	Length
17.	"A Woman's Worth" (remix featuring Nas)	Keys; Rose	Keys; Brothers^{[a]}	4:28
18.	"Juiciest" (Mixtape version)	Keys; James Mtume; Brothers	Brothers	3:03
19.	"If I Was Your Woman" (Original Funky Demo)	Clay McMurray; Gloria Jones; Pam Sawyer	Keys; Brothers; D'Wayne Wiggins	2:59
20.	"Fallin'" (Ali version)	Keys	Keys	4:26
21.	"Typewriter"	Keys; Brothers	Keys; Brothers	3:10
22.	"Butterflyz" (The Drumline Mix)	Keys	Brothers	3:49
23.	"I Won't (Crazy World)"	Keys; Brothers	Keys; Brothers	3:44
24.	"Foolish Heart"	Allen Cato	Cato	4:39
25.	"Crazy (Mi Corazon)"	Keys; Brothers; Paul L. Green; Taneisha Smith	Brothers	3:53
26.	"Ghettoman" (featuring muMs da Schemer)	Bernard Doss; Brothers; Keys	Doss; Brothers	4:17
27.	"Girlfriend" (KrucialKeys Sista Girl Mix – The UK Video Remix Edit)	Keys; Dupri; Thompson	Keys; Brothers^{[a]}	3:52
28.	"I Got a Little Something for You" (live)	Keys		1:45
29.	"Moonlight Sonata" / "L'Interludio, Ambivalente" / "Ain't Misbehavin'" (live)	Ludwig van Beethoven; Ray Chew; Harry Brooks; Andy Razaf; Thomas Waller		2:22
30.	"Light My Fire" (live)	Jim Morrison; John Densmore; Ray Manzarek; Robbie Krieger		3:27
31.	"Fallin'" (remix featuring Busta Rhymes and Rampage)	Keys; Trevor Smith Jr.; Roger McNair	Keys; Brothers^{[a]}	3:56

=== Notes ===
- ^{^[a]} signifies an additional producer
- ^{^[b]} signifies a co-producer
- Live tracks, on both deluxe and Remixed & Unplugged editions, were recorded at KeyArena in Seattle, on August 10, 2002.
- Japanese Remix Plus and UK special edition pressings include track 31 and a remix of "A Woman's Worth".
- Remixed & Unplugged pressings include "Gangsta Lovin'" by Eve featuring Keys, alongside tracks 20, 27–29, and 31; remixes of tracks 3, 5, 7, and 13 by The Neptunes, Jay-J and Chris Lum, Kerry Brothers, and Roger Sanchez, respectively; and live performances of tracks 9, 12, 13, 15, and "Someday We'll All Be Free".
- DVD-Audio pressings include the music videos for "Fallin'", "A Woman's Worth", and "Girlfriend".

Anniversary reissues

- Deluxe edition tracks 17–22 originally appeared on the physical deluxe edition bonus disc. They were accompanied by tracks 23 and 26–30 on the collector's edition.
- Collector's edition pressings include a bonus DVD containing the Songs in A Minor documentary and music videos for all four singles.
- Deluxe edition tracks 20 and 23–25 originally appeared on the 20th anniversary edition. Tracks 20 and 23 are excluded from anniversary vinyl pressings.
- Track 31 was excluded from the digital deluxe edition prior to the 25th anniversary reissue.

Sample credits

- "Girlfriend" contains an interpolation of "Brooklyn Zoo" by Ol' Dirty Bastard.
- "Fallin'" contains an uncredited sample of "It's a Man's Man's Man's World" by James Brown.

== Personnel ==
Credits are adapted from the liner notes of Songs in A Minor.

- A&C Productions – strings (track 16)
- Alli – art direction, creative direction
- Arden Altino – additional keyboards (track 11), production (track 11)
- Miri Ben-Ari – additional strings (track 16), keyboards (track 11), production (track 11), violin (tracks 4 and 11)
- Brandon Barnes – songwriting (track 12)
- Kerry "Krucial" Brothers – additional production (tracks 5 and 10), digital programming (tracks 4–6, 8, 10, 14, and 16), drum programming (tracks 1 and 3), engineering (tracks 3–6, 10, and 13–16), production (1, 3, 6, and 14), songwriting (tracks 5, 6, and 10)
- Gerry Brown – engineering (track 1), mixing (tracks 1, 5, 6, 13, and 14)
- Kandi Burruss – background vocals (track 8), production (track 8), songwriting (track 8)
- Ralph Cacciurri – engineering (track 8)
- Warryn Campbell – songwriting (track 14)
- Cato – guitar concept (track 13)
- Brian Cox – keyboards (track 2)
- Jimmy Cozier – production (track 11), vocals (track 11), songwriting (track 11)
- Clive Davis – executive production
- Jermaine Dupri – production (track 2), songwriting (track 2)
- Tony Duran – photography
- Peter Edge – executive production
- Russ Elevado – mixing (tracks 3, 4, and 16)
- Gerald G. Flowers – guitar (tracks 6, 13, and 14)
- Reggie Flowers – additional fills (track 14)
- Vic Flowers – bass (tracks 6 and 14)
- Brian Frye – engineering (track 2)
- Richie Goods – bass (track 16), upright bass (track 13)
- Paul L. Green – background vocals (tracks 5 and 7)
- Andricka Hall – background vocals (track 4)
- Isaac Hayes – flute arrangement (track 6), Rhodes piano (track 6), string arrangement (track 6)
- The Isaac Hayes Orchestra – flute arrangement (track 6), string arrangement (track 6)
- Norman Hedman – percussion (tracks 6 and 10)
- Rufus Jackson – bass (track 10)
- Acar Key – engineering (track 12)
- Alicia Keys – arrangement (tracks 4, 5, 7–13, 15, and 16), background vocals (tracks 1–3, 5–10, 13, 14, and 16), digital programming (tracks 7 and 10), executive production, instrumentation (tracks 3, 4, 5, and 8), keyboards (tracks 1, 6, 11, and 16), piano (tracks 1, 2, 6, 11–14, and 16), piano concept (track 9), production (tracks 1–8 and 10–16), songwriting (tracks 1, 2, 4–11, and 13–16), string arrangements (track 16), vocals (all tracks)
- Manny Marroquin – mixing (tracks 7 and 10)
- Tony Maserati – mixing (track 11)
- Brian McKnight – instrumentation (track 9), production (track 9), songwriting (track 12)
- Cindy Mizelle – background vocals (track 4)
- Anthony Nance – drum programming (track 9)
- Nowhere – design, logo design
- John Peters – organ (track 16)
- Herb Powers Jr. – mastering
- Prince – songwriting (track 3)
- Jeff Robinson – executive production, management
- Erika Rose – songwriting (track 7)
- Tammy Saunders – background vocals (track 4)
- Tim Shider – bass (track 5), bass concept (track 14)
- Rick St. Hillaire – engineering (track 11)
- Mary Ann Souza – engineering assistance (track 9)
- Taneisha Smith – songwriting (tracks 6 and 10)
- Phil Tan – mixing (track 2)
- Joshua Thompson – songwriting (track 2)
- Dionne Webb – hair
- Patti Wilson – styling
- Kéla Wong – makeup
- Chris Wood – engineering (track 9)
- Arty White – guitar (tracks 7 and 10)

== Charts ==
=== Weekly charts ===
2001–2002 weekly chart performance
Chart	Peak position
Australian Albums (ARIA)	3
Australian Urban Albums (ARIA)	1
Austrian Albums (Ö3 Austria)	4
Belgian Albums (Ultratop Flanders)	8
Belgian Albums (Ultratop Wallonia)	10
Canadian Albums (Billboard)	2
Canadian R&B Albums (Nielsen SoundScan)	1
Danish Albums (Hitlisten)	4
Dutch Albums (Album Top 100)	1
European Top 100 Albums (Music & Media)	5
Finnish Albums (Suomen virallinen lista)	8
French Albums (SNEP)	12
German Albums (Offizielle Top 100)	2
Greek International Albums (IFPI)	5
Hungarian Albums (MAHASZ)	18
Icelandic Albums (Tónlistinn)	16
Irish Albums (IRMA)	5
Italian Albums (FIMI)	4
Japanese Albums (Oricon)	44
New Zealand Albums (RMNZ)	4
Norwegian Albums (VG-lista)	12
Polish Albums (ZPAV)	9
Scottish Albums (Official Charts)	9
South African Albums (RISA)	9
Spanish Albums (AFYVE)	19
Swedish Albums (Sverigetopplistan)	10
Swiss Albums (Schweizer Hitparade)	3
UK Albums (Official Charts)	6
UK R&B Albums (Official Charts)	1
US Billboard 200	1
US Top R&B/Hip-Hop Albums (Billboard)	1

2011 weekly chart performance (Note: The 2011 chart entries in France and the Netherlands are credited to the deluxe and collector's editions. In the US, the original album re-entered the Billboard charts, based on combined units of standard, deluxe, and collector's editions.)
Chart (2011)	Peak position
Dutch Albums (Album Top 100)	69
French Albums (SNEP)	124
US Billboard 200	69

=== Monthly charts ===
2002 monthly chart performance
Chart	Peak position
South Korean International Albums (RIAK)	15

=== Year-end charts ===
2001 year-end chart performance
Chart	Position
Austrian Albums (Ö3 Austria)	35
Belgian Albums (Ultratop Flanders)	98
Canadian Albums (Nielsen SoundScan)	7
Canadian R&B Albums (Nielsen SoundScan)	3
Dutch Albums (Album Top 100)	18
European Top 100 Albums (Music & Media)	28
French Albums (SNEP)	98
German Albums (Offizielle Top 100)	21
Global 20 (Billboard)	7
Italian Albums (Musica e Dischi)	100
New Zealand Albums (RMNZ)	47
Swedish Albums (Sverigetopplistan)	32
Swiss Albums (Schweizer Hitparade)	19
UK Albums (OCC)	38
US Billboard 200	13
US Top R&B/Hip-Hop Albums (Billboard)	3
Worldwide Albums (IFPI)	7

2002 year-end chart performance
Chart	Position
Australian Albums (ARIA)	14
Australian Urban Albums (ARIA)	3
Austrian Albums (Ö3 Austria)	44
Belgian Albums (Ultratop Flanders)	38
Belgian Albums (Ultratop Wallonia)	21
Canadian Albums (Nielsen SoundScan)	41
Canadian R&B Albums (Nielsen SoundScan)	8
Dutch Albums (Album Top 100)	21
European Top 100 Albums (Music & Media)	10
French Albums (SNEP)	45
German Albums (Offizielle Top 100)	37
Italian Albums (FIMI)	50
New Zealand Albums (RMNZ)	28
Swedish Albums (Sverigetopplistan)	85
Swiss Albums (Schweizer Hitparade)	28
UK Albums (OCC)	31
US Billboard 200	23
US Top R&B/Hip-Hop Albums (Billboard)	12
Worldwide Albums (IFPI)	43

2003 year-end chart performance
Chart	Position
Australian Urban Albums (ARIA)	18
UK Albums (OCC)	153

=== Decade-end charts ===
2000s decade-end chart performance
Chart	Position
US Billboard 200	32
US Top R&B/Hip-Hop Albums (Billboard)	12

=== Centurial charts ===
21st century chart performance
Chart	Position
US Billboard 200	76
US Top R&B/Hip-Hop Albums (Billboard)	44

=== All-time charts ===
All-time chart performance
Chart	Position
Irish Female Albums (IRMA)	47
US Billboard 200	107
US Billboard 200 (Women)	31

== Certifications ==
Certifications and sales
Region	Certification	Certified units/sales
Australia (ARIA)	3× Platinum	210,000^{‡}
Austria (IFPI Austria)	Gold	20,000^{*}
Belgium (BRMA)	Gold	25,000^{*}
Canada (Music Canada)	5× Platinum	500,000^{^}
Croatia (HDU)	Silver	
Denmark (IFPI Danmark)	Platinum	50,000^{^}
France (SNEP)	Platinum	300,000^{*}
Germany (BVMI)	Platinum	300,000^{^}
Italy (FIMI)	Platinum	150,000
Japan (RIAJ)	Gold	100,000^{^}
Netherlands (NVPI)	2× Platinum	160,000^{^}
New Zealand (RMNZ)	Platinum	15,000^{^}
Norway (IFPI Norway)	Gold	25,000^{*}
Poland (ZPAV)	Gold	20,000^{*}
South Africa (RISA)	Platinum	50,000^{*}
South Korea	—	23,138
Spain (Promusicae)	Platinum	100,000^{^}
Sweden (GLF)	Platinum	80,000^{^}
Switzerland (IFPI Switzerland)	2× Platinum	80,000^{^}
United Kingdom (BPI)	3× Platinum	1,144,603
United States (RIAA)	7× Platinum	7,000,000^{‡}
Summaries
Europe (IFPI)	3× Platinum	3,000,000^{*}
Worldwide	—	12,000,000
^{*} Sales figures based on certification alone.^{^} Shipments figures based on certification alone.^{‡} Sales+streaming figures based on certification alone.

== Release history ==
Release dates and formats
Region	Date	Edition(s)	Format(s)	Label(s)	Ref.
Canada	June 26, 2001	Standard	CD	BMG	
United States	June 26, 2001	Standard	Cassette; CD	J	
United Kingdom	July 23, 2001	Standard	CD	J	
Sweden	July 30, 2001	Standard	CD	BMG	
South Korea	August 16, 2001	Standard	Cassette; CD	BMG	
Australia	September 3, 2001	Standard	CD	BMG	
Germany	September 3, 2001	Standard	CD	BMG	
Japan	September 26, 2001	Standard	CD	BMG	
France	October 15, 2001	Standard	CD	BMG	
Japan	February 27, 2002	Remix Plus	CD	BMG	
United Kingdom	March 11, 2002	Special	Enhanced CD	J	
Sweden	October 14, 2002	Remixed & Unplugged	Double CD	BMG	
Germany	October 28, 2002	Remixed & Unplugged	Double CD	BMG	
United Kingdom	October 28, 2002	Remixed & Unplugged	Double CD	J	
Canada	November 12, 2002	Remixed & Unplugged	Double CD	BMG	
Japan	February 26, 2003	Remixed & Unplugged	CD	BMG	
United States	December 9, 2003	Standard	DVD-Audio	J	
Germany	June 24, 2011	Collector's; deluxe	Box set; double CD	Sony	
Australia	June 27, 2011	Collector's; deluxe	Box set; double CD	Sony	
France	June 27, 2011	Collector's; deluxe	Box set; double CD	Sony	
United Kingdom	June 27, 2011	Collector's; deluxe	Box set; double CD	Sony	
United States	June 28, 2011	Collector's; deluxe	Box set; double CD	J; Legacy	
United States	June 28, 2011	Standard	Vinyl	J; Legacy	
Japan	July 3, 2011	Collector's; deluxe	Box set; double CD	Sony Japan	
United Kingdom	September 19, 2011	Standard	Vinyl	Sony	
Various	June 4, 2021	Anniversary	Digital download; streaming	RCA; Legacy	
Various	January 21, 2022	Anniversary	Vinyl (Note: The anniversary vinyl was reissued on June 26, 2026, the 25th anniversary of Songs in A Minor, in two limited-edition variants.)	RCA; Legacy	
Various	June 5, 2026	Deluxe (Note: Digital deluxe edition had previously been made available in 2023, excluding one track.)	Digital download; streaming	RCA; Legacy	

== See also ==
- Alicia Keys discography
- List of best-selling albums by women
- List of Billboard 200 number-one albums of 2001
- List of Billboard number-one R&B albums of 2001
- List of UK R&B Albums Chart number ones of 2001
- List of top 25 albums for 2002 in Australia
- New Zealand top 50 albums of 2001
- New Zealand top 50 albums of 2002
