= List of Billboard Mainstream Top 40 number-one songs of 2001 =

This is a list of songs which topped the Billboard Mainstream Top 40 chart in 2001.

During 2001, a total of 14 singles hit number-one on the charts.

The best-performing song of 2001, "Hanging by a Moment" by Lifehouse, never reached #1 on the weekly charts.

Issue date	Song	Artist(s)	Ref
January 6	"Independent Women Part I"	Destiny's Child	
January 13	"It Wasn't Me"	Shaggy featuring Rikrok	
January 20	"It Wasn't Me"	Shaggy featuring Rikrok	
January 27	"Independent Women Part I"	Destiny's Child	
February 3	"Independent Women Part I"	Destiny's Child	
February 10	"Again"	Lenny Kravitz	
February 17	"Again"	Lenny Kravitz	
February 24	"Love Don't Cost a Thing"	Jennifer Lopez	
March 3	"Again"	Lenny Kravitz	
March 10	"Angel"	Shaggy featuring Rayvon	
March 17	"Angel"	Shaggy featuring Rayvon	
March 24	"Angel"	Shaggy featuring Rayvon	
March 31	"Angel"	Shaggy featuring Rayvon	
April 7	"Angel"	Shaggy featuring Rayvon	
April 14	"Angel"	Shaggy featuring Rayvon	
April 21	"Angel"	Shaggy featuring Rayvon	
April 28	"Angel"	Shaggy featuring Rayvon	
May 5	"All for You"	Janet	
May 12	"All for You"	Janet	
May 19	"All for You"	Janet	
May 26	"Lady Marmalade"	Christina Aguilera, Lil' Kim, Mýa, and P!nk	
June 2	"Lady Marmalade"	Christina Aguilera, Lil' Kim, Mýa, and P!nk	
June 9	"Lady Marmalade"	Christina Aguilera, Lil' Kim, Mýa, and P!nk	
June 16	"Lady Marmalade"	Christina Aguilera, Lil' Kim, Mýa, and P!nk	
June 23	"Lady Marmalade"	Christina Aguilera, Lil' Kim, Mýa, and P!nk	
June 30	"Lady Marmalade"	Christina Aguilera, Lil' Kim, Mýa, and P!nk	
July 7	"Lady Marmalade"	Christina Aguilera, Lil' Kim, Mýa, and P!nk	
July 14	"Lady Marmalade"	Christina Aguilera, Lil' Kim, Mýa, and P!nk	
July 21	"Lady Marmalade"	Christina Aguilera, Lil' Kim, Mýa, and P!nk	
July 28	"All or Nothing"	O-Town	
August 4	"All or Nothing"	O-Town	
August 11	"All or Nothing"	O-Town	
August 18	"All or Nothing"	O-Town	
August 25	"Let Me Blow Ya Mind"	Eve featuring Gwen Stefani	
September 1	"Hit 'em Up Style (Oops!)"	Blu Cantrell	
September 8	"Hit 'em Up Style (Oops!)"	Blu Cantrell	
September 15	"Hit 'em Up Style (Oops!)"	Blu Cantrell	
September 22	"Hit 'em Up Style (Oops!)"	Blu Cantrell	
September 29	"Hit 'em Up Style (Oops!)"	Blu Cantrell	
October 6	"Fallin'"	Alicia Keys	
October 13	"Fallin'"	Alicia Keys	
October 20	"Fallin'"	Alicia Keys	
October 27	"Fallin'"	Alicia Keys	
November 3	"Fallin'"	Alicia Keys	
November 10	"I'm Real"	Jennifer Lopez featuring Ja Rule	
November 17	"I'm Real"	Jennifer Lopez featuring Ja Rule	
November 24	"Family Affair"	Mary J. Blige	
December 1	"Family Affair"	Mary J. Blige	
December 8	"Family Affair"	Mary J. Blige	
December 15	"Family Affair"	Mary J. Blige	
December 22	"How You Remind Me"	Nickelback	
December 29	"How You Remind Me"	Nickelback	

== See also ==
- 2001 in music
