= Girlfriend (Alicia Keys song) =

2002 single by Alicia Keys

Single by Alicia Keys

from the album Songs in A Minor
- B-side: "Troubles"
- Released: November 11, 2002
- Studio: Southside (Atlanta)
- Length: 3:34
- Label: J
- Songwriters: Jermaine Dupri; Alicia Keys; Joshua Thompson; Robert Diggs; Russell Jones
- Producers: Alicia Keys; Jermaine Dupri

Alicia Keys singles chronology
"Gangsta Lovin'" (2002)	"Girlfriend" (2002)	"You Don't Know My Name" (2003)

Music video
- "Girlfriend" on YouTube

"Girlfriend" is a song by American singer-songwriter Alicia Keys for her debut studio album Songs in A Minor (2001). It was written by Keys, Jermaine Dupri, and Joshua Thompson, while production was helmed by Dupri and Keys. The song is built around an interpolation from Ol' Dirty Bastard's 1995 song "Brooklyn Zoo". Due to the inclusion of the sample, Robert Diggs and Russell Jones are also credited as songwriters. "Girlfriend" was released as the fourth and final single from Songs in A Minor outside the United States on November 11, 2002, by J Records.

In the US, "Girlfriend" peaked at number 82 on the Billboard Hot R&B/Hip-Hop Singles & Tracks chart as an album cut. Although it outpeaked previous single "How Come You Don't Call Me" in the United Kingdom and Australia, it failed to make an impact elsewhere. The song's KrucialKeys Sista Girl Mix, which appears on the re-release Songs in A Minor: Remixed & Unplugged, was used in the song's accompanying music video, directed by Patrick Hoelck, and was serviced to radio instead of the album version.

== Music and lyrics ==
Lyrically, in "Girlfriend", Keys cannot help but think that her boyfriend is having a relationship with his close female friend. She says she knows that the woman is only a friend of him, but she cannot stop thinking that her boyfriend may leave her. Keys then proceeds to say that she thinks she is jealous of his "girlfriend". Musically, the song contains an interpolation from Ol' Dirty Bastard's 1995 song "Brooklyn Zoo".

== Music video ==
The video for "Girlfriend" was directed by Patrick Hoelck and shot on location in East London, England, the video uses the KrucialKeys Sista Girl Mix. The video starts in Keys' bedroom where her boyfriend is talking to his close female friend on the phone. She gets frustrated so she leaves the house to take a long walk through the city. While walking, she sees her boyfriend also on a walk with his female friend across the street. Keys then walks into a clothing store, performing in the fitting room. Strolling through clothing aisles, she spots a pair of red leather pants—at the same time the female friend had seen them. Keys yanks the hanger into her own hands. After the second verse is performed, the video shifts to a large, empty basement where she plays a musical piece on the piano. The video then goes back to the store, where Keys leaves out of to perform choreography with three other dancers at the corner of a street. Shortly after, she returns home to discover that her boyfriend and his female friend had been planning a surprise party for her all along.

== Track listings and formats ==
- European CD single
1. "Girlfriend" (KrucialKeys Sista Girl Mix) – 3:27
2. "Girlfriend" (Original Album Version) – 3:34
- European and Australian CD maxi-single
1. "Girlfriend" (KrucialKeys Sista Girl Mix) – 3:27
2. "Girlfriend" (Brat Pac Remix) – 3:54
3. "Girlfriend" (Original Album Version) – 3:34
4. "Fallin'" (Ali Version) – 4:30
- UK CD and 12-inch single
1. "Girlfriend" (KrucialKeys Sista Girl Mix) – 3:27
2. "Girlfriend" (Brat Pac Remix) – 3:54
3. "Troubles" (Jay-J & Chris Lum Bootleg Mix) – 4:24

- UK cassette single

A1. "Girlfriend" (KrucialKeys Sista Girl Mix) – 3:27
A2. "Troubles" (Jay-J & Chris Lum Bootleg Mix) – 4:24
B1. "Girlfriend" (KrucialKeys Sista Girl Mix) – 3:27
B2. "Troubles" (Jay-J & Chris Lum Bootleg Mix) – 4:24

- US 12-inch single

A1. "Girlfriend" (Club Mix) – 3:30
A2. "Girlfriend" (Instrumental) – 3:30
B1. "Girlfriend" (Acappella) – 3:30
B2. "Fallin'" – 3:16

== Personnel ==
Personnel are adapted from the liner notes of Songs in A Minor.

- Alicia Keys – production, arrangement, vocal arrangement, lead vocals, backing vocals, piano
- Bryan-Michael Cox – keyboards
- Jermaine Dupri – production
- Phil Tan – mixing

== Charts ==
Weekly chart performance for "Girlfriend"
Chart (2001–2003)	Peak position
Australia (ARIA)	13
Belgium (Ultratip Bubbling Under Flanders)	17
Belgium (Ultratip Bubbling Under Wallonia)	12
Canada (Nielsen SoundScan)	71
Europe (Eurochart Hot 100)	85
Germany (GfK)	100
Ireland (IRMA)	40
Netherlands (Dutch Top 40)	18
Netherlands (Single Top 100)	18
Scottish Singles Sales (Official Charts)	37
UK Singles (Official Charts)	24
UK Hip Hop/R&B (Official Charts)	6
US Hot R&B/Hip-Hop Songs (Billboard)	82

== Release history ==
Release dates and formats for "Girlfriend"
Region	Date	Format(s)	Label(s)	Ref.
Sweden	November 11, 2002	Maxi CD	BMG	
Germany	November 25, 2002	Maxi CD	BMG	
United Kingdom	November 25, 2002	12-inch vinyl; cassette; maxi CD	J	
Australia	January 13, 2003	Maxi CD	BMG	
