= Mashimaro =

- Flash animation cartoons character
- Created by: Kim Jae In

In-universe information
- Nickname: Yeopki Tokki
- Species: Rabbit

Mashimaro (Korean: 마시마로) or Yeopgi Tokki (엽기토끼; lit. 'bizarre rabbit') is a South Korean fictional character who resembles a fat rabbit, created by Kim Jae In (김재인). Mashimaro debuted in a series of Flash animations (mostly without any dialogue) on the internet. Mashimaro is far more often seen in merchandise, similar to Hello Kitty. (Mashimaro would in fact be best described as Korea's answer to Sanrio). Mashimaro merchandise can be found on the internet and in Korean communities around the world.

The original Mashimaro cartoons are full of toilet humour, which can also be found in some of the merchandise. Mashimaro himself is often portrayed with a plunger stuck to his head.

When this character was first designed, multiple directors decided not to use him because they believed "cartoon characters must have big eyes and positive attitudes", in contrast to Mashimaro's thin eyes and pessimistic attitude. Creator Kim Jae In created a series of flash animations on an internet cartoon site, which gained popularity. Some years later, the company began to professionally market Mashimaro.

Mashimaro also has a look-alike, Chocomaro, who is brown. Chocomaro appears in two parodies of Mashimaro episodes, including Episodes 2 and 3. Chocomaro tries to do what Mashimaro would normally do in these episodes, but always messes them up and ends up getting hurt. It is unknown exactly what relationship Chocomaro shares with Mashimaro, but most believe that he is the brother of Mashimaro.

The name "Mashimaro" came from the creator's niece/nephew mispronouncing the word "marshmallow" and this character was modeled after the creator's nephew.

A Chinese-Korean animated series based on the character was created in 2018. In 2020, it was announced that a live-action movie of Mashimaro would be produced. The movie was released on April 6, 2022, and was titled Detective Mashimaro.

== See also ==
- Contemporary culture of South Korea
