= Fallin' (Alicia Keys song) =

2001 single by Alicia Keys

Single by Alicia Keys

from the album Songs in A Minor
- B-side: "Rear View Mirror"
- Released: March 28, 2001
- Studio: KrucialKeys (New York City)
- Genre: Neo soul; R&B
- Length: 3:30 (album version); 3:16 (radio edit)
- Label: J
- Songwriter: Alicia Keys
- Producer: Alicia Keys

Alicia Keys singles chronology
"Fallin'" (2001)	"A Woman's Worth" (2001)

Audio sample
- file; help

Music video
- "Fallin'" on YouTube

"Fallin'" is a song by American singer-songwriter Alicia Keys. It was released as the lead single from her debut studio album, Songs in A Minor (2001), and as Keys' debut single. Written and produced by Keys, "Fallin'" is generally considered her signature song. It was released on March 28, 2001, by J Records. The official remix features rappers Busta Rhymes and Rampage.

"Fallin'" attained global commercial success, reaching number one on the US Billboard Hot 100 and the top 10 in several countries, topping the charts of Flanders, the Netherlands, and New Zealand. In 2009, "Fallin'" was named the 29th most successful song of the 2000s, on the Billboard Hot 100 Songs of the Decade. Critically acclaimed, it won three Grammy Awards at the 44th Annual Grammy Awards in 2002, including Song of the Year, Best R&B Song, and Best Female R&B Vocal Performance, and was also nominated for Record of the Year.

== Music and lyrics ==
"Fallin'" was written and produced solely by Alicia Keys for her debut album Songs in A Minor. When asked about the lyrical background for the song, Keys told Billboard: "I wanted to write a song for someone who was 10 or 12 years old – like a young Michael Jackson. Even though he was young, he was singing some deep stuff back then. [The song] is about the ins and outs of a relationship. Sometimes, you're completely head-over-heels in love with someone, and sometimes you can't stand that person. You fall in and out, sometimes it goes back and forth, and that's just what relationships are about."

According to the sheet music published at Musicnotes.com by Sony/ATV Music Publishing, "Fallin'" is set in 12/8 time with a "free" tempo of 60 beats per minute. It is composed in the key of E minor, with Keys's vocal range spanning from the low-note of B_{3} to the high-note of E_{5}. The song has a basic chord progression of Em–Bm_{7}–Em–Bm_{7} as it follows a "moderate blues tempo" throughout the chorus of the song.

The underlying piano motif in "Fallin'" strongly resembles the repeating piano riff in James Brown's 1966 single "It's a Man's Man's Man's World".

== Critical reception ==
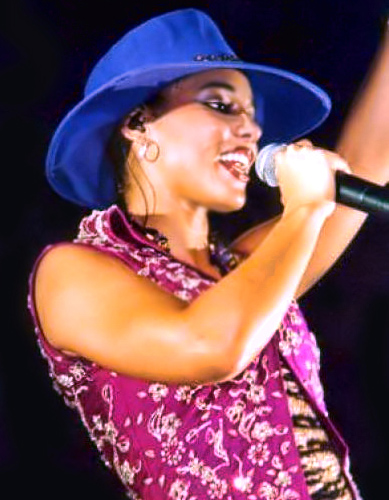
Keys performing "Fallin'" in Frankfurt, Germany in 2002

NME called "Fallin'" a "[m]assive, massive massive hit" adding "Piano tinkles, drum machine coughs like an athsmatic [sic] whippet and Alicia strokes your spine with ice cubes and spatters your spotty back with hot candle wax". The song was described as "gospel fervor of lovesick righteousness" by Beth Johnson of Entertainment Weekly. Robert Hilburn of the Los Angeles Times described the song as having "the neo-soul vitality of Macy Gray and Jill Scott." Sam Faulkner of NME said that the song had "deeper moments [that] creep up and grab you exemplified." Mark Anthony Neal of PopMatters said that the song "combines Keys' natural blues register with a subtle, and brilliantly so, sample of James Brown's 'It's a Man's, Man's, Man's World'." Barry Walters of Rolling Stone said "there's no denying the serious early Aretha vibe permeating the hit."

Sal Cinquemani of Slant Magazine said that "the gospel-tinged [song] starts out simply with measured piano and basic drum programming, eventually building to a crescendo of operatic proportions." Steve Jones of USA Today described the song as "a bluesy ode to self-destructive love" and further commented that the song "is only a teaser for what she has to offer." Simon Price of The Independent called the song Keys' breakthrough song and noted how the melody of the song is similar to Queen's "We Are the Champions". Stephen Thomas Erlewine of AllMusic pointed out the lack of depth in the song, saying it "doesn't have much body to it", which he felt was "a testament to Keys' skills as a musician."

== Accolades ==
One of the most critically acclaimed singles of 2001, "Fallin'" was nominated for numerous awards. It connected well with National Academy of Recording Arts and Sciences (NARAS) and was nominated for four Grammy Awards at the 44th ceremony (2002): Song of the Year, Record of the Year, Best Female R&B Vocal Performance, and Best R&B Song. It ended up winning all but one of the four awards, as Record of the Year was awarded to U2's "Walk On". At the 2001 Billboard Music Awards, "Fallin'" was nominated for the Hot 100 Single of the Year; however, it lost the award to Lifehouse's "Hanging by a Moment". The song was also nominated for Outstanding Song and Outstanding Music Video at the 2002 NAACP Image Awards; it did not win in either category.

On The Village Voice's 2001 Pazz & Jop critics' poll, "Fallin'" appeared at number four. In 2003, Q Magazine ranked "Fallin'" at number 713 in their list of the "1001 Best Songs Ever". In September 2011, "Fallin'" was placed at number 22 by VH1 on its list "100 Greatest Songs of the '00s". "[G]ospel vibe and powerful vocals form Keys" led Complex to place the song on number two on its list "The 25 Best Alicia Keys Songs". The Telegraph compiled a list of "100 songs that defined the Noughties" and placed "Fallin'" at number 97. In December 2009, Rolling Stone ranked it at number 62 on their list "100 Best Songs of the Decade". "Fallin'" placed at number 413 on Blender magazine's "500 Greatest Songs Since You Were Born". In 2011, the song was ranked at number five on Nerve's list "The 25 Greatest Love Songs of the 2000s". In January 2024, Rolling Stone ranked "Fallin'" at number seven on their list of "100 Greatest R&B Songs of the 21st Century".

== Commercial performance ==
In the United States, "Fallin'" debuted at number 98 on the Billboard Hot 100 for the week of June 16, 2001. The song peaked atop the chart in its eighth week, where it would remain for six non-consecutive weeks. It remained on the chart for a total of 34 weeks and managed to chart on the 2001 Billboard Year-End Hot 100 at number two, behind Lifehouse's "Hanging by a Moment"; however, it was the highest-charting number-one single on the chart in 2001.

== Music video ==
The accompanying music video for "Fallin'" was directed by Chris Robinson. The video opens with a radio playing "Girlfriend", where Keys is sitting at a piano. The plot has Keys traveling to a prison to visit her incarcerated boyfriend. The plot is continued in the video for Keys' next single "A Woman's Worth", which explores what happens when Keys' boyfriend is released and, with her help, adjusts back to regular life. Keys said in an interview that originally, she was supposed to be the one incarcerated, and her boyfriend was visiting her.

== Track listings and formats ==
- US 12-inch vinyl (remix)

A1. "Fallin'" (remix) (featuring Busta Rhymes and Rampage) – 4:15
A2. "Fallin'" (remix) (instrumental version) – 4:15
B1. "Fallin'" (remix) (without rap) – 3:35
B2. "Fallin'" (radio version) – 3:16

- UK CD single
1. "Fallin'" (radio version) – 3:16
2. "Fallin'" (remix) (featuring Busta Rhymes and Rampage) – 4:15
3. "Rear View Mirror" – 4:03
4. "Fallin'" (video/picture gallery/lyrics)
- UK 12-inch single

A1. "Fallin'" (remix) (featuring Busta Rhymes and Rampage) – 4:15
B1. "Fallin'" (album version) – 3:30
B2. "Fallin'" (instrumental) – 3:06

- UK cassette single
1. "Fallin'" (radio version) – 3:16
2. "Fallin'" (remix) (featuring Busta Rhymes and Rampage) – 4:15
3. "Rear View Mirror" – 4:03
- European CD single
1. "Fallin'" – 3:30
2. "Fallin'" (extended remix) (featuring Busta Rhymes and Rampage) – 4:15
- European CD maxi-single
1. "Fallin'" (radio edit) – 3:16
2. "Fallin'" (album version) – 3:30
3. "Fallin'" (extended remix) (featuring Busta Rhymes and Rampage) – 4:15
4. "Fallin'" (Remix) (without rap) – 3:35
5. "Fallin'" (remix instrumental) – 4:15
6. "Fallin'" (video)
- Australian and New Zealand CD maxi-single
1. "Fallin'" (radio edit) – 3:16
2. "Fallin'" (album version) – 3:30
3. "Fallin'" (extended remix) (featuring Busta Rhymes and Rampage) – 4:15
4. "Fallin'" (remix) (without rap) – 3:35
5. "Fallin'" (remix instrumental) – 4:15

== Credits and personnel ==
Credits are adapted from the liner notes of Songs in A Minor.

- Alicia Keys – lead vocals, backing vocals, all other instruments, producer, arranger
- Miri Ben-Ari – violin
- Kerry "Krucial" Brothers – drum programming
- Spaceman Patterson – guitar
- Cindy Mizelle – backing vocals
- Tammy Saunders – backing vocals
- Andricka Hall – backing vocals
- Russ Elevado – mixer

== Charts ==
=== Weekly charts ===
Chart (2001)	Peak position
Australia (ARIA)	7
Australian Urban (ARIA)	3
Austria (Ö3 Austria Top 40)	3
Belgium (Ultratop 50 Flanders)	1
Belgium (Ultratop 50 Wallonia)	3
Canada (Nielsen SoundScan)	24
Canada CHR (Nielsen BDS)	1
Croatia (HRT)	5
Denmark (Tracklisten)	14
Europe (Eurochart Hot 100)	3
France (SNEP)	5
Germany (GfK)	2
Greece (IFPI)	10
Ireland (IRMA)	3
Italy (FIMI)	6
Netherlands (Dutch Top 40)	1
Netherlands (Single Top 100)	1
New Zealand (Recorded Music NZ)	1
Norway (VG-lista)	2
Poland (ZPAV)	4
Scottish Singles Sales (Official Charts)	6
Spain (Promusicae)	6
Sweden (Sverigetopplistan)	7
Switzerland (Schweizer Hitparade)	2
UK Singles (Official Charts)	3
UK Hip Hop/R&B (Official Charts)	1
US Billboard Hot 100	1
US Adult Contemporary (Billboard)	24
US Adult Pop Airplay (Billboard)	14
US Hot R&B/Hip-Hop Songs (Billboard)	1
US Pop Airplay (Billboard)	1
US Rhythmic Airplay (Billboard)	2

Chart (2012)	Peak position
South Korea International Singles (Gaon)	161

=== Year-end charts ===
Chart (2001)	Position
Australia (ARIA)	52
Austria (Ö3 Austria Top 40)	20
Belgium (Ultratop 50 Flanders)	14
Belgium (Ultratop 50 Wallonia)	26
Brazil (Crowley)	22
Canada Airplay (Nielsen BDS)	27
Europe (Eurochart Hot 100)	15
France (SNEP)	87
Germany (Media Control)	16
Ireland (IRMA)	35
Netherlands (Dutch Top 40)	2
Netherlands (Single Top 100)	3
New Zealand (RIANZ)	21
Sweden (Hitlistan)	21
Switzerland (Schweizer Hitparade)	10
UK Singles (OCC)	54
UK Urban (Music Week)	33
US Billboard Hot 100	2
US Adult Top 40 (Billboard)	75
US Hot R&B/Hip-Hop Singles & Tracks (Billboard)	9
US Mainstream Top 40 (Billboard)	22
US Rhythmic Top 40 (Billboard)	13

Chart (2002)	Position
Canada Airplay (Nielsen BDS)	61
Europe (Eurochart Hot 100)	26
France (SNEP)	35
Italy (FIMI)	33
Switzerland (Schweizer Hitparade)	36
UK Airplay (Music Week)	60
US Adult Top 40 (Billboard)	43
US Mainstream Top 40 (Billboard)	69

=== Decade-end charts ===
Chart (2000–2009)	Position
Netherlands (Dutch Top 40)	94
Netherlands (Single Top 100)	21
US Billboard Hot 100	29

=== All-time charts ===
Chart (1958–2018)	Position
US Billboard Hot 100	171

== Certifications ==
Region	Certification	Certified units/sales
Australia (ARIA)	3× Platinum	210,000^{‡}
Austria (IFPI Austria)	Platinum	40,000^{*}
Belgium (BRMA)	Platinum	50,000^{*}
Canada (Music Canada)	2× Platinum	160,000^{‡}
Denmark (IFPI Danmark)	Platinum	90,000^{‡}
France (SNEP)	Gold	250,000^{*}
Germany (BVMI)	Platinum	500,000^{‡}
Italy (FIMI)	Gold	25,000^{‡}
Netherlands (NVPI)	Platinum	60,000^{^}
New Zealand (RMNZ)	2× Platinum	60,000^{‡}
Norway (IFPI Norway)	Platinum	
Portugal (AFP)	Gold	20,000^{‡}
Spain (Promusicae)	Platinum	60,000^{‡}
Sweden (GLF)	Platinum	30,000^{^}
Switzerland (IFPI Switzerland)	Platinum	40,000^{^}
United Kingdom (BPI)	Platinum	600,000^{‡}
United States (RIAA)	4× Platinum	4,000,000^{‡}
^{*} Sales figures based on certification alone.^{^} Shipments figures based on certification alone.^{‡} Sales+streaming figures based on certification alone.

== Release history ==
Release dates and formats for "Fallin'"
Region	Date	Format(s)	Label(s)	Ref.
United States	March 28, 2001	Rhythmic contemporary radio; urban contemporary radio; urban adult contemporary radio	J	
Germany	August 20, 2001	CD; maxi CD	BMG	
Sweden	September 3, 2001	Maxi CD	BMG	
France	September 24, 2001	Maxi CD	J	
Australia	October 15, 2001	Maxi CD	BMG	
United Kingdom	October 29, 2001	12-inch vinyl; cassette; maxi CD	RCA	
France	November 27, 2001	CD	J	

== See also ==
- Billboard Year-End Hot 100 singles of 2001
- List of best-selling singles of 2001 (Germany)
- List of Billboard Hot 100 number ones of 2001
- List of Billboard Mainstream Top 40 number-one songs of 2001
- List of Dutch Top 40 number-one singles of 2001
- List of Hot 100 Airplay number-one singles of the 2000s
- List of Hot R&B/Hip-Hop Singles & Tracks number ones of 2001
- List of number-one singles in 2001 (New Zealand)
- List of UK top-ten singles in 2001
- Ultratop 50 number-one hits of 2001
