= Now Tour (Maxwell) =

2001–02 concert tour by Maxwell

- Tour by Maxwell
- Associated album: Now
- Start date: August 13, 2001
- End date: August 10, 2002
- Legs: 2
- No. of shows: 49 in North America; 49 in total

Maxwell concert chronology
- Urban Hang Suite Tour (1997); Now (2001-02); Maxwell 08 Tour (2008)

The Now Tour is a concert tour by American R&B singer Maxwell, in support of his multi-platinum selling album Now. The tour started in North America on August 13, 2001, in New York City at the Irving Plaza with additional dates through October. The itinerary included multiple dates in Washington, D.C., Atlanta and Chicago.

== Background ==
Before the release of Maxwell's album, the singer performed an intimate show on August 6 in Detroit for the second of a series of small-venue dates to promote his anticipated next album Now, which is due out August 21. Seven of the 11 songs Maxwell and his 10-piece band performed during his one-hour "open rehearsal"—in front of a capacity crowd of 1,000 at St. Andrews Hall—came from the album, including the epic love ballad "Lifetime", a version of Kate Bush's "This Woman's Work", and the upbeat encore "Get To Know Ya." Maxwell scheduled to perform seven concert dates in New York City between August 13 through the 25, with J Records new artist Alicia Keys as supporting act.

Alicia Keys will join soul man Maxwell for a 25-date, 14-city tour that kicks off August 13 in New York. Keys is touring behind her Songs in A Minor, her first album, which debuted at #1 on the Billboard albums chart. Throughout the tour, more dates were added in several cities across the U.S. with two final shows in December. Maxwell resumed touring in 2002, planning a mini summer tour in the U.S.

== Opening Acts ==
- Alicia Keys (USA—Leg 1)
- Angie Stone (USA—Indianapolis)

== Set list ==
1. "Urban Suite" (Intro interlude)
2. "Now/At the Party"
3. "Sumthin' Sumthin'"
4. "Everwanting:To Want you to Want Me"
5. "Lifetime"
6. "This Woman's Work"
7. "Get to Know Ya"
8. "Dancewitme"
9. "W/As My Girl"
10. "For Lovers Only"
11. "Fortunate"
12. "Changed"
13. "...Til the Cops Come Knockin'"
14. "You're the Kinda Woman"
15. "Whenever Wherever Whatever"
16. "Suite Theme" (tease)
17. "Ascension (Don't Ever Wonder)"

== Band ==
- Guitar: Wah Wah Watson

== Tour dates ==
Date	City	Country	Venue
North America
August 6, 2001	Detroit	United States	Saint Andrew's Hall
August 13, 2001	New York City	United States	Irving Plaza
August 14, 2001	New York City	United States	Apollo Theater
August 17, 2001	New York City	United States	Roseland Ballroom
August 19, 2001	New York City	United States	Hammerstein Ballroom
August 20, 2001	New York City	United States	Beacon Theatre
August 24, 2001	New York City	United States	City Center Theater
August 25, 2001	New York City	United States	Theater at Madison Square Garden
September 5, 2001	Washington, D.C.	United States	DAR Constitution Hall
September 6, 2001	Washington, D.C.	United States	DAR Constitution Hall
September 8, 2001	Washington, D.C.	United States	DAR Constitution Hall
September 9, 2001	Washington, D.C.	United States	DAR Constitution Hall
September 11, 2001	Washington, D.C.	United States	DAR Constitution Hall
September 12, 2001	Washington, D.C.	United States	DAR Constitution Hall
September 14, 2001	Atlanta	United States	Chastain Park Amphitheater
September 15, 2001	Atlanta	United States	Chastain Park Amphitheater
September 17, 2001	Fort Pierce	United States	Sunrise Theatre
September 18, 2001	Orlando	United States	Hard Rock Live
September 20, 2001	Charlotte	United States	Ovens Auditorium
September 22, 2001	St. Louis	United States	Fox Theatre
September 23, 2001	Kansas City	United States	Midland Theatre
September 25, 2001	Milwaukee	United States	Riverside Theater
September 26, 2001	Minneapolis	United States	Orpheum Theatre
September 28, 2001	Chicago	United States	Arie Crown Theater
September 29, 2001	Chicago	United States	Arie Crown Theater
October 1, 2001	Grand Rapids	United States	DeVos Hall
October 2, 2001	Indianapolis	United States	Murat Centre
October 4, 2001	Columbus	United States	Palace Theatre
October 5, 2001	Cleveland	United States	Cleveland Music Hall
October 7, 2001	Cincinnati	United States	Music Hall
October 9, 2001	Detroit	United States	Fox Theater
October 13, 2001	Toronto	Canada	Massey Hall
October 17, 2001	Wallingford	United States	Oakdale Theatre
October 18, 2001	Boston	United States	Wang Center for the Performing Arts
October 20, 2001	Philadelphia	United States	Tweeter Center
October 22, 2001	Baltimore	United States	Lyric Opera House
December 4, 2001	Houston	United States	Aerial Theater
December 5, 2001	Houston	United States	Aerial Theater
July 24, 2002	Upper Darby Township	United States	Tower Theater
July 25, 2002	Wantagh	United States	Tommy Hilfiger at Jones Beach Theater
July 27, 2002	Newark	United States	New Jersey Performing Arts Center
July 28, 2002	Newark	United States	New Jersey Performing Arts Center
July 31, 2002	Washington, D.C.	United States	DAR Constitution Hall
August 1, 2002	Washington, D.C.	United States	DAR Constitution Hall
August 3, 2002	Toronto	Canada	Hummingbird Centre
August 4, 2002	Cleveland	United States	Cleveland Music Hall
August 7, 2002	Chicago	United States	Arie Crown Theater
August 8, 2002	Detroit	United States	Chene Park
August 10, 2002	Richmond	United States	Landmark Theater

Note

- Not all 2002 U.S. tour dates my not be listed.
