= 2001 Billboard Music Awards =

Annual American music awards ceremony

- Date: December 4, 2001
- Location: MGM Grand Garden Arena, Las Vegas
- Country: United States
- Hosted by: Bernie Mac
- Website: http://www.billboard.com/bbma/

Television/radio coverage
- Network: Fox

The 2001 Billboard Music Awards. took place on December 4, 2001 at the MGM Grand Garden Arena in Las Vegas. The ceremony was hosted by Bernie Mac.

== Artist of the Year ==
- Destiny's Child
- Jennifer Lopez
- Nelly
- Shaggy

== Female Artist of the Year ==
- Alicia Keys
- Dido
- Jennifer Lopez
- Janet Jackson

== Male Artist of the Year ==
- Shaggy
- Lenny Kravitz
- Nelly
- Ja Rule

== Artist of the Year – Duo/Group ==
- Destiny's Child
- 112
- Lifehouse
- Train

== New Artist of the Year ==
- Lifehouse
- Alicia Keys
- Dream
- Linkin Park

== Album of the Year ==
- Backstreet Boys – Black & Blue
- The Beatles – 1
- Shaggy – Hotshot
- Various artists – Now That's What I Call Music! Vol. 5

== Albums Artist of the Year ==
- Backstreet Boys
- The Beatles
- NSYNC
- Shaggy

== Male Albums Artist of the Year ==
- Ja Rule
- Tim McGraw
- Nelly
- Shaggy

== Female Albums Artist of the Year ==
- Enya
- Alicia Keys
- Sade
- Britney Spears

== Duo/Group Albums Artist of the Year ==
- Backstreet Boys
- The Beatles
- Limp Bizkit
- ’NSYNC

== Hot 100 Single of the Year ==
- Janet Jackson – "All for You"
- Alicia Keys – "Fallin'"
- Lifehouse – "Hanging by a Moment"
- Train – "Drops of Jupiter (Tell Me)"

== Hot 100 Singles Artist of the Year ==
- Destiny's Child
- Janet Jackson
- Jennifer Lopez
- Matchbox Twenty

== Male Hot 100 Singles Artist of the Year ==
- Ja Rule
- Jay-Z
- Nelly
- Shaggy

== Female Hot 100 Singles Artist of the Year ==
- Faith Hill
- Janet Jackson
- Alicia Keys
- Jennifer Lopez

== Hot 100 Singles Artist of the Year – Duo/Group ==
- 112
- Destiny's Child
- Lifehouse
- Matchbox Twenty

== R&B/Hip-Hop Artist of the Year ==
- Ja Rule
- Jay-Z
- R. Kelly
- Musiq Soulchild

== Male R&B/Hip-Hop Artist of the Year ==
- Ja Rule
- Jay-Z
- R. Kelly
- Musiq Soulchild

== Female R&B/Hip-Hop Artist of the Year ==
- Missy "Misdemeanor" Elliott
- Eve
- Alicia Keys
- Jill Scott

== R&B/Hip-Hop Artist of the Year – Duo/Group ==
- 112
- Destiny's Child
- Jagged Edge
- Outkast

== New R&B/Hip-Hop Artist of the Year ==
- Jaheim
- Alicia Keys
- Ludacris
- Musiq Soulchild

== R&B/Hip-Hop Album of the Year ==
- R. Kelly – TP-2.com
- Alicia Keys – Songs in A Minor
- Shaggy – Hot Shot
- Musiq Soulchild – Aijuswanaseing (I Just Want to Sing)

== R&B/Hip-Hop Single of the Year ==
- Case – "Missing You"
- Jagged Edge w/ Nelly – "Where the Party At"
- R. Kelly f/ Jay-Z – "Fiesta"
- Musiq Soulchild – "Love"

== Country Artist of the Year ==
- Kenny Chesney
- Toby Keith
- Tim McGraw
- Travis Tritt

== Male Country Artist of the Year ==
- Kenny Chesney
- Toby Keith
- Tim McGraw
- Travis Tritt

== Female Country Artist of the Year ==
- Sara Evans
- Jo Dee Messina
- Jamie O’Neal
- Lee Ann Womack

== Country Artist of the Year – Duo/Group ==
- Brooks & Dunn
- Diamond Rio
- Dixie Chicks
- Lonestar

== New Country Artist of the Year ==
- Jamie O’Neal
- Trick Pony
- Blake Shelton
- Cyndi Thomson

== Country Album of the Year ==
- Faith Hill – Breathe
- Tim McGraw – Greatest Hits
- Various artists – "Coyote Ugly" soundtrack
- Various artists – "O Brother, Where Art Thou?" soundtrack

== Country Single of the Year ==
- Brooks & Dunn – "Ain’t Nothing ’Bout You"
- Kenny Chesney – "Don't Happen Twice"
- Toby Keith – "You Shouldn't Kiss Me Like This"
- Travis Tritt – "It's a Great Day to Be Alive"

== Modern Rock Artist of the Year ==
- Fuel
- Incubus
- Linkin Park
- Staind

== Modern Rock Single of the Year ==
- Incubus – "Drive"
- Lifehouse – "Hanging by a Moment"
- Staind – "It's Been Awhile"
- Tool – "Schism"

== Rock Artist of the Year ==
- 3 Doors Down
- Godsmack
- Linkin Park
- Staind

== Rock Single of the Year ==
- Fuel – "Hemorrhage (In My Hands)"
- Godsmack – "Awake"
- Staind – "It's Been Awhile"
- Tool – "Schism"

== Rap Artist of the Year ==
- City High
- Lil’ Bow Wow
- Lil’ Romeo
- Outkast

== Rap Single of the Year ==
- City High – "What Would You Do?"
- Lil’ Bow Wow – "Bow Wow (That's My Name)"
- Lil’ Romeo – "My Baby"
- Outkast – "Ms. Jackson"

== Special awards ==
- Century Award: John Mellencamp
- Artist Achievement Award: Janet Jackson
- Biggest one-week sales for an album in 2001: NSYNC, Celebrity (Jive)
- Special award for first four albums debuting at No. 1: DMX
