= A Woman's Worth =

2001 single by Alicia Keys

Single by Alicia Keys

from the album Songs in A Minor
- B-side: "Fallin'"
- Released: October 2, 2001
- Studio: Quad Recording (New York City); Emerald (Nashville, Tennessee); NRG (West Hollywood, California)
- Length: 5:03 (album version); 4:13 (radio edit)
- Label: J
- Songwriters: Alicia Keys; Erika Rose
- Producer: Alicia Keys

Alicia Keys singles chronology
"Fallin'" (2001)	"A Woman's Worth" (2001)	"How Come You Don't Call Me" (2002)

Music video
- "A Woman's Worth" on YouTube

"A Woman's Worth" is a song recorded by American singer-songwriter Alicia Keys for her debut studio album Songs in A Minor (2001). It was written by Keys and Erika Rose and produced by Keys. The song was released as the second single from Songs in A Minor on October 2, 2001, by J Records, following the worldwide success of her debut single "Fallin'".

"A Woman's Worth" became another top-ten success for Keys in the United States, where it reached number seven on the Billboard Hot 100 and number three on the Hot R&B/Hip-Hop Songs. The accompanying music video for the song, directed by Chris Robinson, is a continuation of the video for "Fallin'" video and explores what happened when Keys' on-screen love interest got released from prison and tried to acclimate to society. The video was nominated for both Best R&B Video and Best Cinematography at the 2002 MTV Video Music Awards, while the song won an NAACP Image Award for Outstanding Song the same year.

== Music video ==
The single's music video was directed by Chris Robinson and shot entirely in Brooklyn, New York. Its plot continues from Keys' previous video for "Fallin'" which revolves around Keys' travel to her imprisoned boyfriend. "A Woman's Worth" picks up where the previous video left, depicting his release from prison and tries to acclimate to society. The clip premiered on BET's 106 & Park on October 16, 2001.

== Live performances ==
At the 2002 Grammy Awards ceremony, Keys performed both "Fallin'" and a tango-influenced version of "A Woman's Worth". On June 26, 2011, at the BET Awards, Keys performed the song as a duet with Bruno Mars.

== Track listings and formats ==
- European CD single
1. "A Woman's Worth" (Original Radio Version) – 4:21
2. "A Woman's Worth" (Remix Radio Version) – 4:28
- European enhanced CD single
1. "A Woman's Worth" – 5:05
2. "A Woman's Worth" (Remix) – 4:45
3. "A Woman's Worth" (Instrumental) – 5:11
4. "A Woman's Worth" (Video)
- European CD maxi-single
1. "A Woman's Worth" (Original Radio Version) – 4:21
2. "A Woman's Worth" (Remix Radio Version) – 4:28
3. "A Woman's Worth" (Remix Club Version) – 4:28
4. "A Woman's Worth" (Remix Instrumental Version) – 5:02
5. "A Woman's Worth" (Video)
- Australian CD maxi-single
1. "A Woman's Worth" (Original Radio Version) – 4:21
2. "A Woman's Worth" (Remix Radio Version) – 4:28
3. "A Woman's Worth" (Remix Club Version) – 4:28
4. "A Woman's Worth" (Remix Instrumental Version) – 5:02
5. "Fallin'" (Remix) (featuring Busta Rhymes and Rampage) – 3:35

- European cassette single

A1. "A Woman's Worth" – 5:05
A2. "A Woman's Worth" (Remix) – 4:45
B1. "A Woman's Worth" – 5:05
B2. "A Woman's Worth" (Remix) – 4:45

- US 12-inch single (The Remix)

A1. "A Woman's Worth" (Club Mix) – 4:28
A2. "A Woman's Worth" (Radio Mix) – 4:28
B1. "A Woman's Worth" (Instrumental) – 5:02
B2. "A Woman's Worth" (Acappella) – 4:25

- European 12-inch single

A1. "A Woman's Worth" – 5:05
B1. "A Woman's Worth" (Remix) – 4:45
B2. "A Woman's Worth" (Instrumental) – 5:11

== Personnel ==
- Alicia Keys – producer, arranger, drum programming, lead vocals, backing vocals
- Arty White – guitar
- Paul L. Green – backing vocals
- Manny Marroquin – mixing

== Charts ==
=== Weekly charts ===
Chart (2001–2002)	Peak position
Australia (ARIA)	16
Australian Urban (ARIA)	5
Austria (Ö3 Austria Top 40)	71
Belgium (Ultratop 50 Flanders)	31
Belgium (Ultratop 50 Wallonia)	37
Croatia (HRT)	1
Europe (Eurochart Hot 100)	56
Germany (GfK)	45
Hungary (Single Top 40)	9
Ireland (IRMA)	25
Italy (FIMI)	29
New Zealand (Recorded Music NZ)	5
Netherlands (Dutch Top 40)	11
Netherlands (Single Top 100)	22
Norway (VG-lista)	14
Romania (Romanian Top 100)	68
Scottish Singles Sales (Official Charts)	28
Spain (Promusicae)	15
Sweden (Sverigetopplistan)	31
Switzerland (Schweizer Hitparade)	32
UK Singles (Official Charts)	18
UK Hip Hop/R&B (Official Charts)	3
US Billboard Hot 100	7
US Hot R&B/Hip-Hop Songs (Billboard)	3
US Pop Airplay (Billboard)	16
US Rhythmic Airplay (Billboard)	10

=== Year-end charts ===
Chart (2002)	Position
New Zealand (RIANZ)	29
US Billboard Hot 100	51
US Hot R&B/Hip-Hop Singles & Tracks (Billboard)	27
US Mainstream Top 40 (Billboard)	77
US Rhythmic Top 40 (Billboard)	51

== Certifications ==
Region	Certification	Certified units/sales
Australia (ARIA)	Gold	35,000^{^}
United States (RIAA)	Gold	500,000^{‡}
^{^} Shipments figures based on certification alone.^{‡} Sales+streaming figures based on certification alone.

== Release history ==
Release dates and formats
Region	Date	Format(s)	Label(s)	Ref.
United States	October 2, 2001	Rhythmic contemporary radio; urban contemporary radio; urban adult contemporary	J	
United States	November 20, 2001	Contemporary hit radio	J	
Germany	February 11, 2002	Maxi CD	BMG	
Sweden	February 11, 2002	Maxi CD	BMG	
France	February 19, 2002	Maxi CD	J	
Australia	March 11, 2002	Maxi CD	BMG	
United Kingdom	March 18, 2002	12-inch vinyl; cassette; maxi CD	J	
Canada	April 30, 2002	Maxi CD	BMG	

== See also ==
- New Zealand Top 50 Singles of 2002
