= How Come U Don't Call Me Anymore? =

1982 single by Prince

Song by Prince
- A-side: "1999" (US, UK 7-inch); "D.M.S.R." (UK 12-inch)
- Released: September 24, 1982
- Studio: Sunset Sound (Los Angeles, California)
- Length: 3:50; 6:11 ("Take 2" version)
- Label: Warner Bros.
- Songwriter: Prince
- Producer: Prince

"How Come U Don't Call Me Anymore?" is a song by American musician Prince. It is a ballad of romantic longing with some gospel elements. On his original recording of the song, which was released as the non-album B-side to his 1982 single "1999", Prince performs most of the song in his falsetto range, with his own bluesy piano playing providing the only instrumental accompaniment. The song's first album appearance was on his 1993 compilation The Hits/The B-Sides. It was later included on the soundtrack to the 1996 film Girl 6. Prince also performs the song on his 2002 live album One Nite Alone... Live!.

Artists who have covered the song include Stephanie Mills (1983) whose version reached No. 12 on the Billboard R&B chart, Joshua Redman (1998), and Alicia Keys (2001). Bilal recorded the song which appears on his 2001 single "Fast Lane". Roger Cicero recorded the song with Soulounge for the 2004 album Home; a live version by Cicero is included on his 2008 single "Alle Möbel verrückt". American Idol season 11 finalist Jessica Sanchez performed the song on the American Idols Live! Tour 2012.

== Alicia Keys version ==
"How Come You Don't Call Me"

Single by Alicia Keys

from the album Songs in A Minor
- B-side: "Butterflyz"
- Released: March 12, 2002
- Studio: KrucialKeys (New York City)
- Length: 3:57 (album version); 3:31 (radio edit)
- Label: J
- Songwriter: Prince
- Producers: Alicia Keys; Kerry "Krucial" Brothers

Alicia Keys singles chronology
"A Woman's Worth" (2001)	"How Come You Don't Call Me" (2002)	"Gangsta Lovin'" (2002)

Music video
- "How Come You Don't Call Me" on YouTube

=== Recording and production ===
Alicia Keys recorded a cover of the song—retitled "How Come You Don't Call Me"—for her debut studio album Songs in A Minor (2001). She later told Billboard: "I had never heard [the original] before. They gave me a copy of the song on tape. I played it every day for three weeks. It is so raw and so truthful – I was just feeling it. It really came out well."

Keys' cover of "How Come You Don't Call Me" was inspired by a long-term relationship with a partner, and was produced by Keys alongside Kerry Brothers, Jr. An official remix of the song, produced by the Neptunes, was included on the Remixed & Unplugged in A Minor reissue of Songs in A Minor in 2002. It features vocals from Justin Timberlake towards the end of the track.

=== Music video ===
The accompanying music video for "How Come You Don't Call Me" was directed by Little X. It contains references to Japanese popular culture, such as San-X's Buru Buru Dog and Cardcaptor Sakura's Kero-chan, besides Korean character Mashimaro. The video starts with Keys waking up in the morning, and following her daily routine throughout the video, ending with a performance on stage. The video ends with a phone call from her supposed "boyfriend" (portrayed by Mike Epps) making an excuse about why he hasn't called her, and she hangs up on him, laughing.

=== Critical reception ===
Mark Anthony Neal of PopMatters felt that the song was credible, but fell short from the original or Stephanie Mills' 1983 cover. Keys has said that Prince told her he loved her cover of the song.

=== Track listings and formats ===
- UK and Irish CD single
1. "How Come You Don't Call Me" (Original Radio Version) – 3:31
2. "How Come You Don't Call Me" (Neptunes Remix) – 4:23
- UK and Irish maxi CD single
1. "How Come You Don't Call Me" (Original Radio Version) – 3:31
2. "How Come You Don't Call Me" (Neptunes Remix) – 4:23
3. "How Come You Don't Call Me" (Live Version) – 5:18
4. "Butterflyz" (Roger's Release Mix) – 9:11
5. "How Come You Don't Call Me" (Video)
- European maxi CD single
1. "How Come You Don't Call Me" (Original Radio Version) – 3:31
2. "How Come You Don't Call Me" (Neptunes Remix) – 4:23
3. "Butterflyz" (Roger's Release Mix) – 9:11
4. "How Come You Don't Call Me" (Video)
- Australian and New Zealand maxi CD single
1. "How Come You Don't Call Me" (Neptunes Remix) – 4:23
2. "How Come You Don't Call Me" (Original Radio Version) – 3:31
3. "How Come You Don't Call Me" (Album Version) – 3:57
4. "How Come You Don't Call Me" (Video)
- US 12-inch vinyl

A. "How Come You Don't Call Me" (Neptunes Remix – Main) – 4:21
B. "How Come You Don't Call Me" (Neptunes Remix – Instrumental) – 4:21

- UK 12-inch vinyl

A1. "How Come You Don't Call Me" (Original Album Version) – 3:57
A2. "How Come You Don't Call Me" (Neptunes Remix) – 4:23
B1. "Butterflyz" (Roger's Release Mix) – 9:11

=== Credits and personnel ===
- Alicia Keys – lead vocals, backing vocals, production, all other instruments
- Kerry "Krucial" Brothers – production, drum programming
- Russ Elevado – mixing

=== Charts ===
Weekly chart performance for "How Come You Don't Call Me"
Chart (2002)	Peak position
Australia (ARIA)	29
Belgium (Ultratip Bubbling Under Flanders)	9
Belgium (Ultratip Bubbling Under Wallonia)	3
Europe (Eurochart Hot 100)	62
Germany (GfK)	80
Hungary (Single Top 40)	4
Ireland (IRMA)	32
Netherlands (Dutch Top 40 Tipparade)	18
Netherlands (Single Top 100)	73
Romania (Romanian Top 100)	97
Scottish Singles Sales (Official Charts)	40
Switzerland (Schweizer Hitparade)	60
UK Singles (Official Charts)	26
UK Hip Hop/R&B (Official Charts)	6
US Billboard Hot 100	59
US Hot R&B/Hip-Hop Songs (Billboard)	30
US Pop Airplay (Billboard)	34
US Rhythmic Airplay (Billboard)	23

=== Release history ===
Release dates and formats for "How Come You Don't Call Me"
Region	Date	Format(s)	Label(s)	Ref.
United States	March 12, 2002	Contemporary hit radio; rhythmic contemporary radio; urban contemporary radio	J	
Australia	July 1, 2002	Maxi CD	BMG	
Sweden	July 1, 2002	Maxi CD	BMG	
United Kingdom	July 8, 2002	12-inch vinyl; cassette; maxi CD	J	
France	July 9, 2002	Maxi CD	J	
