= Keys Soulcare =

American lifestyle brand

- Industry: Personal care
- Founded: 2020
- Headquarters: United States
- Key people: Alicia Keys
- Products: Skin care, bodycare, candles
- Owner: e.l.f.; Alicia Keys
- Website: KeysSoulcare.com

Keys Soulcare is a beauty and wellness lifestyle brand by American singer and songwriter Alicia Keys. It includes a variety of skincare and bodycare products, candles, and cosmetics.

The brand's products were first sold in the UK with Cult Beauty.

== History ==
In September 2020, Keys announced plans to launch her own lifestyle brand, called Keys Soulcare. The brand is a joint venture between Keys and cosmetics retailer e.l.f. cosmetics, the latter's chief marketing officer Kory Marchisotto acting as the president of Keys Soulcare.

The brand was launched in December 2020 in the US, early 2021 in the UK. In April 2021, the brand was launched in France, then in Canada in March 2022.

== Distribution ==
In September 2020, the brand began its prelaunch through an editorial site hosted at KeysSoulcare.com and a social campaign, with product sales to follow later that year. The first products became available through the brand's direct-to-consumer website and Ulta Beauty's online store in December 2020.

Ulta Beauty was an early U.S. retail partner for Keys Soulcare. In February 2021, e.l.f. Beauty announced that the brand's collection was available at Ulta Beauty stores nationwide, as well as through Ulta.com and KeysSoulcare.com.

Keys Soulcare later expanded internationally through selected beauty retailers. In the United Kingdom, the brand launched through Cult Beauty. In March 2022, e.l.f. Beauty announced that Keys Soulcare would make its Canadian debut exclusively with Sephora Canada, first through Sephora's website and app and then through more than 85 stores across Canada. The brand has also been distributed through H-Beauty in the United Kingdom and Douglas in other European markets.

In January 2024, Keys Soulcare expanded its online distribution by launching in the Amazon Premium Beauty store. The Amazon launch included the brand's broader skincare, complexion, body care, color care, and lifestyle assortment, along with an Amazon-exclusive facial oil and an online “Offering Selector” intended to help shoppers choose routines.
