= The Great Wall Concert =

- Also known as: Wall of Hope
- Written by: Brian Ransom
- Directed by: Phil Chilvers
- Presented by: Cynthia Garrett
- Starring: Alicia Keys; Cyndi Lauper; Nellie McKay; Boyz II Men; Doyle Bramhall II; Sylvia Tosun
- Ending theme: Walking on the Chinese Wall
- Country of origin: United States
- Original language: English

Production
- Executive producers: Steven C. Daniels; Cary Floyd; Paul Stevens; John Stewart
- Producers: Leigh Steinberg; Richard Lee; Eugene Lou; John Stewart; Louis Horvitz
- Production locations: Great Wall of China, Juyongguan Northern Gate
- Editor: Paul Renner
- Running time: 88 minutes

The Great Wall Concert, also called Wall of Hope – China 2004, was a concert headlined by Alicia Keys, Cyndi Lauper, Nellie McKay, Boyz II Men, Doyle Bramhall II, and Sylvia Tosun, held on the Great Wall of China, Northern Gate of the Juyongguan section on September 25, 2004. The concert was filmed as a television special. The concert was commemorating the 20th anniversary of the Great Wall of China's restoration project that was part of a series of benefit concerts.

The event was invitation-only. It was held to help fund the Chinese Children's Foundation and the restoration of The Great Wall. A press conference with the featured artists was held in the Shangri-La Hotel in Beijing.

The show was broadcast by MTV Network by the Asia Pacific region. Eugene J Lou, a producer of the show, was quoted as saying "We could imagine how great would be the contrast between the magnificent building of the ancient Eastern country and today's Western pop music."

Additional performers included B2K, 3LW, and a Chinese student choir from 171 Middle School who sang "Jasmine Flower" led by Syvia Tosun.

== Production ==
The audio for Great Wall of China Concert was recorded by Jim Pavett of Allusion Studios. The show was broadcast in the United States on MTV and other music TV broadcast stations.

The Great Wall of China Concert production was a 14 camera high definition video shoot. The audio was recorded by Jim Pavett of Allusion Studios, using four Alesis HD24 recorders in 24-bit, 48 kHz mode for a 5.1 surround DVD mix.
