= Tears for Water =

Lyrics and poetry collection

Tears for Water: Songbook of Poems and Lyrics
- Author: Alicia Keys
- Language: English
- Genre: Poetry
- Publisher: G. P. Putnam's Sons
- Publication date: November 4, 2004
- Publication place: United States
- Pages: 179
- ISBN: 0-425-20560-6

Tears for Water: Songbook of Poems and Lyrics is a collection of poems and lyrics written by American recording artist Alicia Keys. It was first issued in the United States as a hardcover edition by G. P. Putnam's Sons, on November 4, 2004. Later in November 2005, it was issued in Canada and Europe in paperback format by Berkley Books. The book consists of twenty-seven poems and lyrics to songs from her studio albums Songs in A Minor (2001) and The Diary of Alicia Keys (2003).

The book appeared on The New York Times Best Seller list and has generated over 500.000 dollars in sales. Another volume was planned for release in fall 2005. To promote the book, Keys appeared on The Early Show and at Barnes & Noble store where she signed copies of it. In 2006, she appeared on the television series Def Poetry Jam, citing the poem "P.O.W.". The book was re-released in October 2018 with a new cover.

== Background and release ==
It's actually gonna be a collection of my poetry and unreleased lyrics and songs from the albums. It's also connected with stories about what provoked me to write what you read. It's very personal and intense and shows a lot of different sides of me. It's gonna be beautiful, it's a great first book.

— Keys, talking about the book to MTV News.

In late 2003, Keys released her second studio album The Diary of Alicia Keys to commercial and critical success. Following was a tour from March to April 2004, The Verizon Ladies First Tour, that she co-headlined with Beyoncé and Missy Elliott. In March 2004, it was reported that a dispute had broken out between literary agents Noah Lukeman and David Vigliano, with Lukeman claiming that he had the right over Vigliano to represent Keys for book publishers, possibly delaying the release of the book. In May 2004, it was announced that Keys had signed a deal to publish two books with G.P. Putnam's Sons, "Songbook" and "The Diary of Alicia Keys". The president of G.P. Putnam's Sons, Carole Baron, commented that "It isn't everyday you are offered the opportunity to publish someone as unbelievably talented as Alicia Keys. Her story is as inspiring as it is astonishing, and we are excited to be publishing her story, in her own words".

Keys explained that "[the book] won't be exactly autobiography, but I love to read so much that I want to make sure the story is really powerful, like Catcher in the Rye or one of the books I love". The title of the book is derived from one of the poems, "Love and Chains", which contains the line: "I don't mind drinking my tears for water". In an interview with The Early Show, Keys further explained that:

And when I read that, it resonated in me because I said, 'Wow, I realized at that moment that all of the songs I write, all of the poetry that I write, every way that I express myself comes from some form of my tears, my pain, my happiness, my joy, my frustration, my confusion.' And I drink them for water to be nourished and to survive, in a way.

The poetry slam themed release party for the book was held at the Harlem Grill in New York City. The release party was hosted by Mums and featured appearances by Kanye West, Mos Def and Common.

== Content ==
- Poems
1. Golden Child
2. P.O.W.
3. 6:33 a.m.
4. Gold of Johannesburg
5. Lilly of the Valley
6. Beckoning Green
7. Damn You!
8. Mind Sex
9. Love in Chains
10. Unfulfilled Keys
11. Bus Ride Through a Periwinkle Sky
12. The Shore (You Sure?)
13. Constant Evolution of Going Nowhere
14. Love with a Shot of Distance
15. Cosmopolitan Woman
16. Still Water
17. Is It Insane?
18. In My Search for Heaven
19. Mr. Jealousy
20. Angel
21. No Room for Religion
22. Such a Strong Word
23. Everywhere is Nowhere
24. Lady Malasuérte
25. Stolen Moment
26. 4 Letter Word
27. When Gone is the Glory
- Lyrics from Songs in A Minor
  1. Girlfriend
  2. Fallin'
  3. Troubles
  4. Rock With You
  5. A Woman's Worth
  6. Jane Doe
  7. Goodbye
  8. The Life
  9. Mister Man
  10. Butterflyz
  11. Why Do I feel So Sad?
  12. Caged Bird
  13. Lovin' You
- Lyrics from The Diary of Alicia Keys
  1. Karma
  2. Heartburn
  3. You Don't Know My Name
  4. If I Ain't Got You
  5. Diary
  6. Dragon Days
  7. Wake Up
  8. So Simple
  9. When You Really Love Someone
  10. Slow Down
  11. Samsonite Man
  12. Nobody, Not Really

== Critical reception ==
Troy Patterson from Entertainment Weekly gave the book a C, stating that "her work would not pass muster in an introductory writing course at a four-year college." Publishers Weekly gave the book a positive review and wrote "nearly half of the book consists of lyrics from her two albums, Songs in A Minor and The Diary of Alicia Keys; while they make a nice complement to the poems, the words feel a bit flat without the blaxploitation beat of "Heartburn", say, or the impassioned vocal delivery of "Fallin'"". The review concluded that "for the Keys completist, however, this will be a compelling book of rock ephemera".

== Release history ==
Region	Date	Format	Publisher
Australia	November 1, 2005	Paperback	Berkley
Canada	November 1, 2005	Paperback	Berkley
Finland	November 1, 2005	Paperback	Berkley
France	November 1, 2005	Paperback	Berkley
Germany	November 1, 2005	Paperback	Berkley
Italy	November 1, 2005	Paperback	Berkley
Japan	November 1, 2005	Paperback	Berkley
Spain	November 1, 2005	Paperback	Berkley
Sweden	November 1, 2005	Paperback	Berkley
United Kingdom	November 1, 2005	Paperback	Berkley
United States	November 4, 2004	Hardcover	G. P. Putnam's Sons
United States	October 28, 2018	Paperback; Kindle	Berkley
