= Keep a Child Alive =

US-based non-profit organization

- Formation: 2003
- Founder: Leigh Blake, Alicia Keys
- Type: Nonprofit organization
- Headquarters: New York City, New York, U.S.
- Executive Chairman and CEO: Antonio Ruiz-Giménez Jr.
- Website: www.keepachildalive.org

Keep a Child Alive (KCA) is a nonprofit organization founded in 2003 by Alicia Keys and Leigh Blake. The organization supports children and families through partnerships with community organizations and programs addressing health, education, safety and other social and economic challenges.

KCA has historically focused on communities affected by HIV/AIDS, particularly in Africa and India. Its work has since expanded to include children's health, education, livelihoods, child protection and other community-based programs. One of its current initiatives, Every Life, focuses on expanding access to neonatal care in Africa, beginning with the building of a neonatal intensive care unit at Ngudu Hospital in Kwimba District, Tanzania.

KCA is led by Executive Chairman and CEO Antonio Ruiz-Giménez Jr. and is headquartered in New York City. The organization also operates Team KCA, a fundraising program through which participants take part in running events to support its work.

== History ==
Keep a Child Alive was established in 2003 following work with children and families affected by HIV/AIDS in Kenya. The organization was founded by Leigh Blake and Alicia Keys and initially focused on supporting children and families affected by HIV/AIDS.

In 2004, KCA expanded its work beyond Kenya by providing funding to Ikageng Itireleng in Soweto, South Africa. In 2007, the organization expanded into Asia, funding the Living India orphanage in Chandrakal, India.

By 2013, KCA had been operating for a decade and reported nine partners and support across five countries. By 2016, KCA reported that its programs had reached approximately 89,000 children, young people and adults in Africa and India.

In 2023, KCA marked its 20th anniversary. The organization reported that it had worked in 25 countries with 36 partners and reached 9 million children and young people over its first two decades.

In 2024, KCA expanded its work through partnerships addressing health and other social and economic challenges affecting children and families. The organization publishes annual reports and financial reports documenting its programs and activities.

In 2024, KCA began a partnership with the Doris Mollel Foundation in Tanzania focused on improving care for premature and critically ill newborns. The partnership developed into a neonatal intensive care unit at Ngudu Hospital in Kwimba District, Tanzania. The facility was inaugurated in February 2026.

The Tanzania project became the first project of Every Life, a KCA initiative focused on expanding access to neonatal care in underserved areas of Africa. The unit at Ngudu Hospital was designed to provide care for more than 1,300 sick and low-birth-weight newborns annually. KCA's stated long-term vision for Every Life is to build 100 neonatal intensive care units across Africa, beginning with the facility in Tanzania.

Keep a Child Alive
- Formation: 2003
- Founder: Leigh Blake, Alicia Keys
- Type: Nonprofit organization
- Headquarters: New York City, New York, U.S.
- Executive Chairman and CEO: Antonio Ruiz-Giménez Jr.
- Website: www.keepachildalive.org

Keep a Child Alive (KCA) is a nonprofit organization founded in 2003 by Alicia Keys and Leigh Blake. The organization supports children and families through partnerships with community organizations and programs addressing health and other social and economic challenges.

KCA has historically focused on communities affected by HIV/AIDS, particularly in Africa and India. Its work has since expanded to include children's health, education, livelihoods, child protection and other community-based programs. One of its current initiatives, Every Life, focuses on expanding access to neonatal care in Africa, beginning with a neonatal intensive care unit at Ngudu Hospital in Kwimba District, Tanzania.

KCA is led by Executive Chairman and CEO Antonio Ruiz-Giménez Jr. and is headquartered in New York City. The organization also operates Team KCA, a fundraising program through which participants take part in running events to raise funds for its work.

== History ==
Keep a Child Alive was established in 2003 following work with children and families affected by HIV/AIDS in Kenya. The organization was founded by Leigh Blake and Alicia Keys and initially focused on supporting children and families affected by HIV/AIDS.

In 2004, KCA expanded its work beyond Kenya by providing funding to Ikageng Itireleng in Soweto, South Africa. In 2007, the organization expanded into Asia, funding the Living India orphanage in Chandrakal, India.

By 2013, KCA had been operating for a decade and reported nine partners and support across five countries. By 2016, KCA reported that its programs had reached approximately 89,000 children, young people and adults in Africa and India.

In 2023, KCA marked its 20th anniversary. The organization reported that it had worked in 25 countries with 36 partners and reached 9 million children and young people over its first two decades.

In the years following its founding, KCA's work expanded beyond its original focus on HIV/AIDS treatment and support. The organization's current programs address a range of issues affecting children and families, including health, education, livelihoods and child protection.

== Programs ==
KCA works with community organizations and other partners on programs addressing health and social challenges affecting children and families. Its activities have included healthcare, education, livelihoods and child protection initiatives.

=== Every Life ===
Every Life is a KCA initiative focused on expanding access to neonatal care in underserved areas of Africa. The initiative began in Tanzania, where KCA partnered with the Doris Mollel Foundation and Tanzania's public health system to establish a neonatal intensive care unit at Ngudu Hospital in Kwimba District, Mwanza Region.

The neonatal unit at Ngudu Hospital was inaugurated on February 28, 2026. The facility was designed to care for more than 1,300 sick and low-birth-weight newborns annually and to provide neonatal services within the local public health system.

KCA's stated long-term vision for Every Life is to build 100 neonatal intensive care units across Africa, beginning with the facility in Tanzania.

== Team KCA ==
Team KCA is a fundraising program operated by Keep a Child Alive through which participants take part in running events and marathons to raise funds for the organization.

== Fundraising ==
=== The Black Ball ===
The Black Ball is a fundraising event established by Keep a Child Alive in 2004. The event was originally organized as the "Pusher's Ball" before being renamed the Black Ball and has historically raised funds for HIV treatment and support programs in Africa and India.

The event has featured performances by musicians and appearances by artists, philanthropists and other public figures. Empire Entertainment has produced the Black Ball since its inception in 2004.

== Leadership ==
Antonio Ruiz-Giménez Jr. serves as Executive Chairman and CEO of Keep a Child Alive. He joined the organization's board in 2015 and later became its chairman and chief executive officer.

Alicia Keys is a co-founder of Keep a Child Alive and has been associated with the organization as a global ambassador.

== Financial information ==
Keep a Child Alive publishes annual impact reports, financial reports and Form 990 filings. Its website currently provides reports dating from 2008 through 2024, including its 2024 annual report and financial report.
