= H Beauty =

British beauty store chain

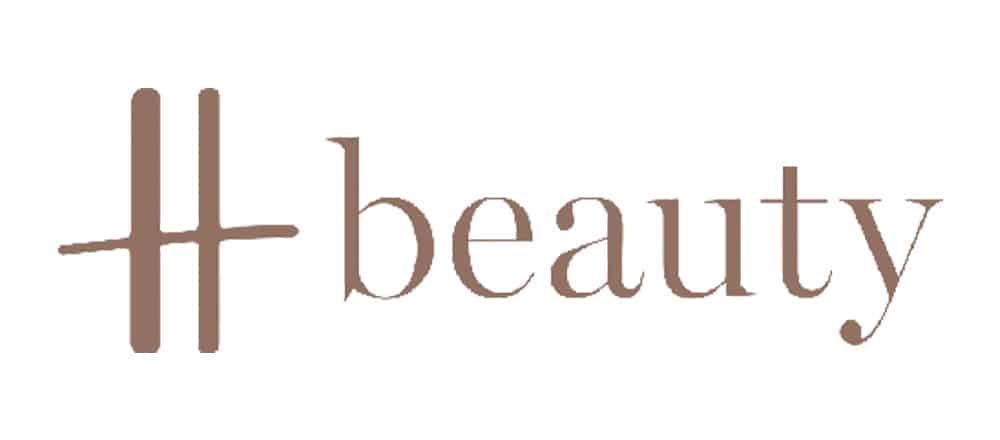
- Type: Subsidiary
- Industry: Cosmetics
- Founded: 17 September 2020; 6 years ago
- Number of locations: 5 (2024)
- Area served: United Kingdom
- Products: Cosmetics; skincare; fragrances; beauty products; haircare products
- Parent: Harrods Group
- Website: Official website

H Beauty is a beauty store chain that operates exclusively outside of London city limits, with locations spanning between 23,000 square feet (2,100 m^{2}) and 30,200 square feet (2,810 m^{2}) of selling space. It is designed to gain market share beyond the reach of the flagship Harrods store.

The flagship Harrods department store unveiled its renovated 90,000-square-foot (8,400 m^{2}) beauty department and 9,000-square-foot (840 m^{2}) skincare department in June and October 2019, respectively. In November 2019, the group announced H Beauty as "a major extension to [their] current beauty business" that underscored their confidence in the beauty industry in the United Kingdom. Industry analysts stated that the specialty store concept was a defensive strategy in light of the retail apocalypse, which saw brick-and-mortar department stores disproportionately impacted.

The first location opened at the Lakeside Shopping Centre in Thurrock, Essex in September 2020, with four subsequent stores operating as of December 2024. The first location in Scotland (third overall) opened at St James Quarter in Edinburgh in December 2021.

H Beauty features beauty products from nearly 80 brands, compared to the nearly 250 brands carried at the flagship store. The target market consists of "younger, regional [customers]" that differs from the older, tourist traffic in Knightsbridge. Selling space ranges between 21,000 square feet (2,000 m^{2}) at St James Quarter in Edinburgh, and 30,200 square feet (2,810 m^{2}) at MetroCentre in Gateshead, Tyne and Wear.
