= Bodycare =

British health and beauty retailer

GR & MM Blackledge plc

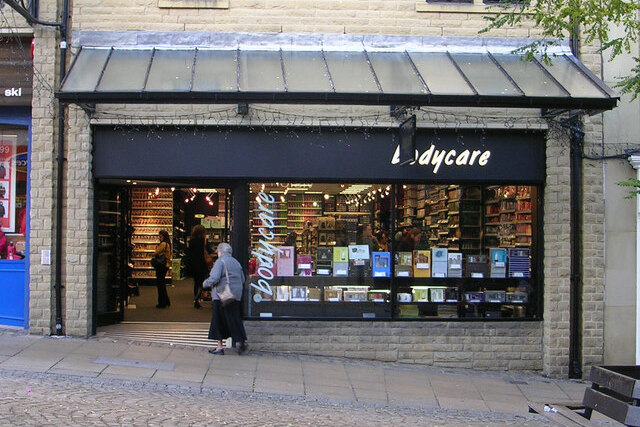
- Bodycare branch in Halifax, England
- Trade name: Bodycare
- Industry: Health and beauty
- Founded: 1970; 56 years ago
- Founders: Graham and Margaret Blackledge
- Defunct: 27 September 2025; 9 months ago
- Fate: Administration
- Website: bodycareonline.co.uk

GR & MM Blackledge plc (trading as Bodycare) was a British health and beauty retailer, founded in 1970, which had 130 stores in the United Kingdom.

== History ==
In 1970, Bodycare was founded by Graham and Margaret Blackledge as a market stall in Lancashire.

The Blackledges sold Bodycare to Baaj Capital in 2022. In June 2023, Baaj Capital announced it would engage in expanding its estate in Southern England, and would introduce a loyalty card.

On 26 August 2025, it was announced that Bodycare was on the brink of collapse. On 5 September 2025, it was announced that the company had entered administration; 32 of the 147 retail stores it owns faced immediate closure, leading to 450 job losses. A further 30 store closures were announced two weeks later. With no buyer being found, on September 22, it was announced that all remaining stores would close by the September 27.

Bodycare was then acquired out of administration by an investment group in October 2025, led by Charles Denton, former CEO of The Body Shop and Molton Brown. Bodycare announced that it would begin reopening locations in early 2026 under the new ownership. The deal transfers the brand and its intellectual property to Denton’s investment group, though financial details were not disclosed. Plans include relaunching 30–50 stores in the first half of 2026, beginning in the Northwest of England.
