= VH1 Storytellers (Alicia Keys album) =

Live album by Alicia Keys
- Released: June 25, 2013
- Recorded: May 2013
- Studio: Metropolis Studios (New York City)
- Length: 59:45
- Label: RCA

Alicia Keys chronology
Girl on Fire (2012)	VH1 Storytellers (2013)	Here (2016)

Alicia Keys live albums chronology
Unplugged (2005)	VH1 Storytellers (2013)

VH1 Storytellers is the second live album and video by American singer Alicia Keys. It was released on June 25, 2013 by RCA Records. The album was recorded as a part of the television show VH1 Storytellers; the episode originally aired on November 12, 2012.

== Critical reception ==
Professional ratings
Review scores
Source	Rating
AllMusic	3/5 stars

Andy Kellman of AllMusic described VH1 Storytellers as enjoyably off-the-cuff, noting that Keys' anecdotes and spontaneous remarks add a personal touch to the live performances.

== Track listing ==
VH1 Storytellers – CD/DVD
No.	Title	Writer(s)	Length
1.	"No One"	Keys; Kerry Brothers Jr.; George M. Harry	6:10
2.	"Brand New Me"	Keys; Emeli Sandé	4:49
3.	"You Don't Know My Name"	Keys; Kanye West; Harold Lilly; J. R. Bailey; Mel Kent; Ken Williams	7:00
4.	"Empire State of Mind (Part II) Broken Down"	Keys; Al Shuckburgh; Shawn Carter; Jane't "Jnay" Sewell-Ulepic; Angela Hunte; Bert Keyes; Sylvia Robinson	4:18
5.	"Not Even The King"	Keys; Emeli Sandé	4:11
6.	"Fallin'"	Keys	4:44
7.	"If I Ain't Got You"	Keys	7:17
8.	"Girl on Fire"	Keys; Jeff Bhasker; Salaam Remi; Billy Squier	4:57
9.	"New Day"	Keys; Kasseem Dean; Trevor Lawrence Jr.; Andre Brissett; Amber "Sevyn" Streeter; Andre Young	4:48
10.	"Try Sleeping with a Broken Heart"	Bhasker; Keys; Patrick "Plain Pat" Reynolds	5:49
11.	"Un-thinkable (I'm Ready)"	Keys; Aubrey Graham; Brothers; Noah Shebib	5:40
Total length:			59:45

== Charts ==
=== Weekly charts ===
Chart (2013)	Peak position
Austrian Albums (Ö3 Austria)	75
Austrian Music DVD (Ö3 Austria)	5
Belgian Music DVD (Ultratop Flanders)	9
Belgian Albums (Ultratop Wallonia)	176
Belgian Music DVD (Ultratop Wallonia)	3
Czech Albums (ČNS IFPI)	31
Croatian International Albums (HDU)	38
Dutch Music DVD (MegaCharts)	6
French Albums (SNEP)	127
French Music DVD (SNEP)	3
German Albums (Offizielle Top 100)	42
Italian Albums (FIMI)	62
South Korean Albums (Circle)	49
South Korean International Albums (Circle)	49
Portuguese Albums (AFP)	20
Spanish Music DVD (Promusicae)	13
Swiss Albums (Schweizer Hitparade)	35
Swiss Music DVD (Schweizer Hitparade)	2
UK R&B Albums (Official Charts)	23
UK Music Videos (Official Charts)	8
US Billboard 200	108
US Top R&B/Hip-Hop Albums (Billboard)	19

=== Year-end charts ===
Chart (2013)	Position
Belgian Music DVD (Ultratop Flanders)	49
Belgian Music DVD (Ultratop Wallonia)	23
