= Dylan Wissing =

American drummer

- Genres: Rock, Pop, R&B
- Occupations: Musician, Engineer
- Instruments: Drums, Percussion, Backing Vocals
- Years active: 1994 - present
- Labels: RCA, Def Jam, Warner Bros., Young Money, Roc-A-Fella
- Website: dylanwissing.com

Dylan Wissing is an American drummer, percussionist and composer.

== Biography ==
Wissing is a native of Bloomington, Indiana. He graduated from Bloomington High School North in 1988, and Indiana University in 1993, with a bachelor's degree in French. He studied at the Indiana University School of Music for two years.

Wissing is best known for playing the "big drums" on Alicia Keys' Grammy Award-winning Number One Hit "Girl on Fire. Besides recording records with artists such as Drake, Kanye West, Eminem and Jay-Z, he was a constant member of the bands Skidmore Fountain and Johnny Socko. The more he has worked with Maybach Music Group, Just Blaze and Saigon. Wissing's song credits include 4 Grammy Award-nominations and 2 wins to date. Wissing was featured in the New York Times for his meticulous session work in duplicating famous rhythms, notably the James Brown "Funky Drummer" beat.

== Discography ==
- 1994 - Johnny Socko - Bovaquarium
- 1996 - Johnny Socko - Oh I Do Hopte It's the Roast Beef
- 1997 - Johnny Socko - Full Trucker Effect
- 1999 - Johnny Socko - Quatro
- 2001 - Johnny Socko - Double Live
- 2002 - Johnny Socko - Johnny Socko
- 2006 - Skidmore Fountain - Skidmore Fountain
- 2007 - Skidmore Fountain - Break
- 2011 - Jay-Z - Watch The Throne
- 2011 - Maybach Music Group - Self Made Vol. 1
- 2011 - Drake - Take Care
- 2012 - Alicia Keys - Girl on Fire
- 2013 - Kanye West - Yeezus
- 2014 - Eminem - Shady XV
