= Brand New Me (Alicia Keys song) =

Single by Alicia Keys

from the album Girl on Fire
- Released: November 19, 2012
- Recorded: The Oven Studios; (New York City, NY)
- Genre: Pop; R&B
- Length: 3:53
- Label: RCA
- Songwriters: Alicia Keys; Emeli Sandé
- Producer: Alicia Keys

Alicia Keys singles chronology
"Girl on Fire" (2012)	"Brand New Me" (2012)	"New Day" (2013)

Music video
- "Brand New Me" on YouTube

"Brand New Me" is a song recorded by American singer-songwriter Alicia Keys for her fifth studio album, Girl on Fire (2012). It was sent to radio by RCA Records on November 19, 2012, as the album's second official single. It was co-written by Keys and Scottish singer-songwriter Emeli Sandé. A follow-up to Keys' previous single "Girl on Fire", "Brand New Me" is a soft ballad, which Keys credits as her autobiography. Lyrically, the song is about personal growth and becoming a brand new version of yourself. It has been met with positive reviews. Keys has performed the song on several occasions including the iTunes Festival of 2012 and VH1 Storytellers.

== Background and release ==
"There may be people in your life that knew you for a long time and they think of you only as the person you used to be and not the person you now are! And this song is a conversation introducing them to the new you. Where nothing can hold you back and no one can hold you down!"

— Alicia Keys, on the song's concept

Girl on Fire is Keys' fifth studio album and a follow-up to The Element of Freedom (2009). It is her first release under RCA Records, after a re-organization at parent company Sony Music Entertainment led to her previous label J Records roster being absorbed into RCA. On November 10, 2012, Keys posted the link for the audio of "Brand New Me" while also tweeting the song's official artwork. She confirmed that it is the second single from Girl on Fire, stating: "'Brand New Me' is one of my favourites, it's going to be my second single and to me it's like my autobiography. It says everything about everywhere that I've come and who I am now. It's about being completely happy with finding yourself." The song's audio was uploaded to Keys' official VEVO channel. It impacted urban adult contemporary radio on November 19.

== Composition ==
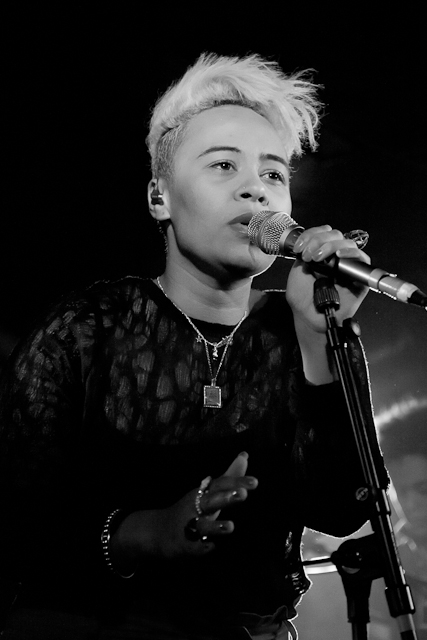
Keys called working with Emeli Sandé "instant magic".

"Brand New Me" is a pop and R&B piano ballad with a duration of three minutes and fifty-three seconds (3:53), which is described as "delicate". Keys co-wrote the song with Scottish recording artist and writer Emeli Sandé. The pair had previously collaborated on Sandé's album, Our Version of Events (2012) for a song entitled "Hope". Sandé explained: "Writing with Alicia Keys was really great. I was nervous, but she’s a very warm person. She knew how to make people feel at ease." They also collaborated on two other songs from Girl on Fire. Of working with Sandé, Keys called it "instant magic" stating: "I have to say, myself and Emeli Sande – when we met and we really began to write together, it was instant magic and that doesn't happen all the time."

Lyrically, the song speaks about growing and evolving. Keys sings about being a brand new version of herself, where nobody has control of her mind, heart and soul. On her official website, the singer wrote: "Brand new me is about the journey it takes to get to a place where you are proud to be a new you." She sings over the soft piano melody: "It's been awhile, I'm not who I was before/You look surprised your words don't burn me anymore/Been meaning to tell ya, but I guess it's plain to see/Don't be mad, it's just a brand-new kinda me/Can't be bad, I've found a brand-new kinda free." According to Andy Kellman of Allmusic, Keys regards "Brand New Me" as her autobiography.

== Critical reception ==
Melissa Maerz of Entertainment Weekly called the song "triumphant" and wrote that Keys "shows off her trills and her cocky attitude". X. Alexander of Idolator wrote: "We like Alicia Keys just the way she’s always been, but if she wants to be a 'Brand New Me' more power to her" and called the song "a graceful piano ballad of the sort we know and love from Alicia." Carl Williott, also from Idolator, praised the track for not being generic, calling it: "the restrained type of pop song that’s becoming harder to find amidst the deluge of hyper-processed vocals and pseudo-dubstep." Mark Edward Nero of About.com praised the song for its empowering message of independence and compared it to her previous single, "Girl on Fire", writing: "Although the song couldn't be more different from the album's title track when it comes to tone and mood, the two songs share a theme of self-empowerment and independence." Scott Shetler of PopCrush noted Keys' vocals to be "breathy". Keenan Higgins of Vibe wrote that it is lyrically "one of her most powerful & inspirational songs to date" and said: "Be prepared to feel a boost of self-worth and intense inspiration with the sound of Alicia's crisp, confident vocals."

== Music video ==
The music video premiered on BET's 106 & Park on December 17, 2012. The video opens with Keys looking uncomfortable as she sits down at her piano while "getting her a massive mop of curls prepped before a shoot". The director shows her affection, but she pulls away. Following her shoot, Keys strolls around the music video set in a quest for "self-discovery" and at one point is seen viewing herself in a handful of mirrors. She then rips off her curly wig, revealing her own hair. The clip ends with a smiling Keys returning to her piano as herself, as a note that says "The journey continues..." appears.

Rolling Stone called the music video a "triumphant turn at reinvention" from Keys. David Greenwald of Billboard said Keys is "starting a fresh story" with "style to match".

== Live performances ==
Keys premiered the track at the iTunes Festival with a live performance on September 28, 2012, along with another new track from the album entitled "Not Even the King". A writer from the website Idolator commented that it was the best part of her set at the festival. On October 16, she performed the song during the 'City Advantage Love the Journey Concert' at Lincoln Center's Avery Fisher Hall in New York City. Georgette Cline of AOL reported that her performance of "Brand New Me" earned her a standing ovation from the crowd.

On November 12, Keys performed the song on VH1 Storytellers, as well as "Not Even the King" and other songs. Josh Stillman of Entertainment Weekly praised her appearance on the show as a whole; he wrote: "She carries herself onstage with cool and confidence – not showy or attention-seeking, merely comfortable – and speaks in a voice so smooth you could drape it over your shoulders." He noted that Keys was backed by a six-piece band for songs such as "No One" and "If I Ain't Got You", but stripped down the mood for the "passionate solo renditions" of "Not Even the King" and "Brand New Me". Keys has announced plans to tour the UK in May 2013, and has confirmed that "Brand New Me" is on the setlist along with several other songs from Girl on Fire as well as her older hits.

== Official remix ==
In celebration of her thirty-second birthday, Keys released a remix of "Brand New Me" entitled "BNM Part 2", on January 25, 2013. Speaking about the remix and her birthday, Keys said: "I’ve been so overwhelmed by all of your birthday love that I HAD to do something extra special for you! Love to you!!!" The up-tempo dance-inspired remix samples "Gypsy Woman (She's Homeless)" (1991) by American recording artist Crystal Waters. Vibe commented that the remix is a "definite departure" from the original song and features "highly stylized elements and a lot of bleeps and pops". Jake Updegraff writing for RyanSeacrest.com noted that the remix version "has an upbeat tone to it that makes the song much different from the original". Complex wrote that Keys sings "in a up-tempo fashion" and described the production as "funky" and "techno".

On January 31, 2013, Keys invited husband Swizz Beatz and close friend Jada Pinkett Smith to Brooklyn in New York City to film a music video for the remix. It was directed by Taj Stansberry. The video remains unreleased; Keys continued to promote Girl on Fire, releasing music videos for "New Day", "Fire We Make" and "Tears Always Win".

== Track listing and formats ==
Digital download
No.	Title	Length
1.	"Brand New Me"	3:53

Official streaming remix
No.	Title	Length
1.	"Brand New Me" (Part II)	3:09

== Credits and personnel ==
Credits adapted from the Girl on Fire liner notes.

Recording

- Recorded and mixed at Oven Studios, New York City, New York

Personnel

- Lead vocals, background vocals, production, piano – Alicia Keys
- Vocal recording – Ann Mincieli
- Vocal mixing – Manny Marroquin
- Mixing assistant – Chris Galland
- Songwriting – Alicia Keys, Emeli Sandé
- Assistant vocal engineers – Val Brathwaite, Ramon Rivas

== Charts ==
=== Weekly charts ===
Chart (2012–13)	Peak position
Belgium (Ultratip Bubbling Under Flanders)	18
Belgium (Ultratip Bubbling Under Wallonia)	32
Israel International Airplay (Media Forest)	7
Italy (FIMI)	98
Netherlands (Dutch Top 40 Tipparade)	2
Netherlands (Single Top 100)	64
South Korea International Singles (Gaon)	35
Canada Urban AC (Nielsen BDS)	20
US Bubbling Under Hot 100 (Billboard)	3
US Adult R&B Songs (Billboard)	7
US Hot R&B/Hip-Hop Songs (Billboard)	37

=== Year-end charts ===
Chart (2013)	Position
US R&B Songs (Billboard)	40

== Certifications ==
Region	Certification	Certified units/sales
United States (RIAA)	Gold	500,000^{‡}
^{‡} Sales+streaming figures based on certification alone.

== Release history ==
Region	Date	Format	Label
United States	November 19, 2012	Urban airplay	RCA Records
Australia	November 29, 2012	Mainstream airplay	RCA Records
Italy	November 30, 2012	Mainstream airplay	Sony Music
