= Not Even the King =

Promotional single by Alicia Keys

from the album Girl on Fire
- Released: September 8, 2012
- Studio: Oven Studios (New York, NY)
- Length: 3:07
- Label: RCA
- Songwriters: Alicia Keys; Emeli Sandé
- Producer: Alicia Keys

Lyric video
- "Not Even the King" on YouTube

"Not Even the King" is a song recorded by American singer-songwriter Alicia Keys for her fifth studio album, Girl on Fire (2012). Co-written by Emeli Sandé, "Not Even the King" is a piano ballad about love which is bigger than the world, and which could not be afforded by a king. The song serves as a promotional single from Girl on Fire. She has performed the song on a number of occasions, and released an artistic lyric video for it on September 8, 2012. It has garnered acclaim by music critics, who praised Keys' vocals and the song's message. It was also included on Keys' ninth studio album, Santa Baby (2022).

== Background and release ==
Girl on Fire is Keys' fifth studio album and a follow-up to The Element of Freedom (2009). It is her first release under RCA Records, after a re-organization at parent company Sony Music Entertainment led to her previous label J Records roster being absorbed into RCA. After 2009, Keys married record producer and rapper Swizz Beatz, became a mother, began co-managing her own career, produced and directed both a Broadway Play and short film, in addition to designing a line of trainers for Reebok. Speaking on how the events of the last three years inspired her during an interview with Billboard, Keys stated: "These last three years have been the most in every way. The most newest, the most difficult, the most loving, the most dream-filled, the most breaking free ... an entire crazy dynamic of lessons and emotions to grow into and claim." She explained that she felt connected to the album, and called it something "very different", stating: "I feel like even the writing style and the way that I've been able to access how I feel has gone to a different place and I feel it's even more raw. It's even more kind of diverse in its topics and I love how it feels." "Girl on Fire", the album's title track, was released as the album's lead single. Apart from the main version, two other versions of the song were released: the "Inferno remix" featuring rapper Nicki Minaj and a softer "Bluelight" version. She released the studio version of "Not Even the King" through a lyric video uploaded to VEVO on September 8, 2012, following her performance of the track at Stand Up to Cancer.

== Music and lyrics ==
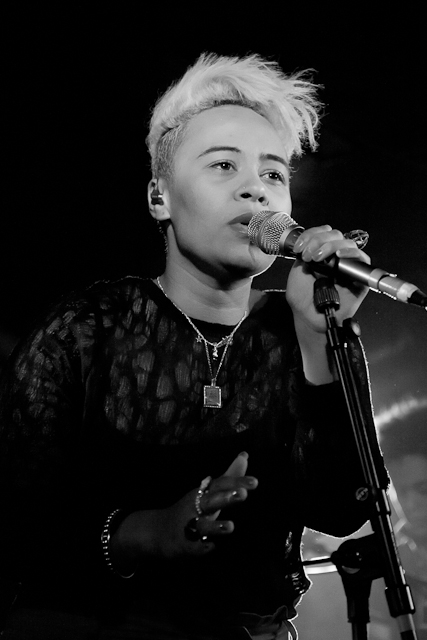
Emeli Sandé co-wrote "Not Even the King" as well as two other tracks from the album.

"Not Even the King" is a piano ballad with a length of three minutes and seven seconds (3:07). Keys co-wrote the song with Scottish recording artist and writer Emeli Sandé. The pair had previously collaborated on Sandé's album, Our Version of Events on a song entitled "Hope". Sandé explained: "Writing with Alicia Keys was really great. I was nervous, but she’s a very warm person. She knew how to make people feel at ease." They also collaborated on two other songs from Girl on Fire, "Brand New Me" and "101". Of working with Sandé, Keys called it "instant magic" stating: "I have to say, myself and Emeli Sande – when we met and we really began to write together, it was instant magic and that doesn't happen all the time."

Lyrically, "Not Even the King" is about "good wealth versus less-good wealth" according to MTV. Over the piano-driven melody, Keys sings about a love of hers which is bigger than the entire world: "Yeah believe that, the trust that we feel the kings never felt that / Yeah, this is the song we sing, we don't need anything / They can't afford this, this is priceless / They can't afford what we got, not even the king." In the song, she describes "your arms around me" as "worth more than a kingdom".

== Lyric video ==
On September 8, 2012, a lyric video was uploaded to Keys' official VEVO channel. It was produced by The Uprising Creative and directed by Laban Pheidias. According to Idolator, the lyric video depicted "artful illustrations of a tune that’s all about being rich in love." According to Trent Fitzgerald of Popcrush said: "The artsy clip gets its muse from late artist-painter Basquiat and creates a collage of typographic images to paint Keys’ sky-reaching vocals [sic] It’s great to hear and see how Keys’ vision of empowerment is taking shape with her songs and visuals." Essence praised the video, writing: "With Basquiat references and artistic touches throughout, the lyric video is unique in itself and isn't like anything we've seen from Keys in recent memory."

== Critical reception ==
Upon its release, the song received acclaim from music critics. Melissa Maerz of Entertainment Weekly commented that she "returns to the bench on 'Not Even the King'" after there are "one too many jazzy smoothfests" on Girl on Fire. Maerz praised the song, stating that: "the music feels surprisingly intimate. You can hear her take a deep breath and press down the pedal before she starts to sing." X. Alexander of Idolator wrote: "Not even the king can afford a voice as lovely as Alicia’s on this sweet, sentimental track." Trent Fitzgerald noted it to be "quite different from her anthemic hit ‘Girl on Fire,’ the song is just as inspirational and emotive." Rap-Up called the song "powerful". Charley Rogulewski of Vibe magazine described the song as a "Tearjerker" and said "It will make you cry." Jenna Rubenstein of MTV Buzzworthy called the lyrics "deep" and wrote: "we can't help it if all we wanna do is sit back with a nice glass of red wine and a boyfriend, and just soak in the sound of Alicia's voice." A less favorable review came from Andy Kellman of Allmusic, who labeled it as a "low" of the album and dismissed it as "an obvious "love is worth more than money" ballad".

== Live performances ==
On September 8, 2012, Keys performed "Not Even the King" at the Stand Up to Cancer telethon; which featured several other artists including Coldplay and Taylor Swift. Of the performance, Charley Rogulewski of Vibe magazine said that she: "commands attention right from the start thanks to the stripped down setup". She performed it at the iTunes Festival on September 28, along with multiple other new tracks from Girl on Fire. On October 16, she performed the song during the 'City Advantage Love the Journey Concert' at Lincoln Center's Avery Fisher Hall in New York City. Her performance earned her a standing ovation and "endless applause".

On November 12, Keys performed the song on VH1 Storytellers, as well as "Brand New Me" and other songs. Josh Stillman of Entertainment Weekly praised her appearance on the show as a whole; he wrote: "She carries herself onstage with cool and confidence – not showy or attention seeking, merely comfortable – and speaks in a voice so smooth you could drape it over your shoulders." He noted that Keys was backed by a six-piece band for songs such as "No One" and "If I Ain't Got You", but stripped down the mood for the "passionate solo renditions" of "Not Even the King" and "Brand New Me". Keys announced plans to tour the UK in May 2013; "Not Even the King" was on the setlist along with several other songs from Girl on Fire, as well as her older hits.

== Credits and personnel ==
Credits adapted from the Girl on Fire liner notes.

Recording

- Recorded and mixed at Oven Studios, New York City, New York

Personnel

- Lead vocals, production, piano – Alicia Keys
- Vocal recording, mixing – Ann Mincieli
- Songwriting – Alicia Keys, Emeli Sandé
- Assistant vocal engineers – Val Brathwaite, Ramon Rivas
