= New Day (50 Cent song) =

Single by 50 Cent featuring Dr. Dre and Alicia Keys
- Released: July 27, 2012
- Recorded: 2012
- Genre: East Coast hip-hop
- Length: 4:24
- Label: Shady; Aftermath; G-Unit; Interscope; Universal
- Songwriters: Curtis Jackson; Andre Young; Kasseem Dean; Alicia Keys; Ryan Montgomery; Marshall Mathers; Trevor Lawrence Jr.; Andrew Brissett; Amber Streeter
- Producers: Dr. Dre; Swizz Beatz

50 Cent singles chronology
"I Just Wanna" (2012)	"New Day" (2012)	"First Date" (2012)

Dr. Dre singles chronology
"The Recipe" (2012)	"New Day" (2012)	"Stronger" (2014)

Alicia Keys singles chronology
"International Party" (2011)	"New Day" (2012)	"Girl on Fire" (2012)

Lyric Video
- "New Day" on YouTube

"New Day" is a song by American rapper 50 Cent. The song was released on July 27, 2012, originally as a single from his scrapped album Street King Immortal, but it was eventually removed from the project. The song was produced by Dr. Dre and mixed by Eminem, while co-written by the two along with 50 Cent, Alicia Keys, Royce da 5'9", Swizz Beatz, Andrew Brissett, Amber Streeter from RichGirl and Trevor Lawrence Jr. from Aftermath Records. The song features a verse from Dr. Dre, while the hook is sung by Alicia Keys. Keys also recorded and released her own version of "New Day" which is featured on her fifth album Girl on Fire (2012).

The song first charted on the week of August 6, 2012 debuting at No. 79 on the Billboard Hot 100. The song fell outside the top 100 during its second week. It also debuted at No. 66 on Billboard Hot R&B/Hip-Hop Songs and managed to climb to number 43, and at No. 28 on Digital Songs. Internationally, the song, charted at No. 43 on Canadian Hot 100, and at No. 52 on Japan Hot 100.

== Background ==
On July 17, 2012, the single was announced during an interview with Digital Spy, with the cover art being unveiled that same day. The single was premiered with DJ Camilo on New York City radio station Hot 97 on July 27, 2012, and then later on Thisis50. The song later was released on iTunes for purchase as digital single on July 30, 2012.

On June 28, Swizz Beatz had leaked the solo version of his wife Alicia Keys' "New Day" on the internet. Later on August 8, 2012, in an interview with XXL, 50 Cent said the single was originally produced for Dr. Dre's album, Detox. They changed the chorus, sending it to Alicia Keys. She later sent it back with the new name, making them change additional strings on it. 50 Cent also revealed that Alicia recorded additional verses for it and leaked the record. Her solo version appears on her fifth studio album Girl on Fire (2012).

In a video uploaded via his YouTube account, 50 Cent also talked about the origins of the song, first meant to be This Life Won't Last Forever. The song's original chorus was vocally recorded and written by Ester Dean. It was sent to Alicia Keys, and then she sent it back with the "New Day" concept. He also said that Dr. Dre wanted the record to "feel like a movie".

On June 4, 2014, 50 Cent confirmed in an interview that all previous singles released on Interscope that were intended for the album, including "New Day", were scrapped and would not appear on the final track listing.

=== A Bronx Tale sample ===
"It don't take much strength to pull a trigger, but try to get up every morning day after day and work for a living. Let's see 'em try that, then we'll see who's the real tough guy; the working man is a tough guy"

— Lorenzo Anello, of the gangster movie A Bronx Tale (1993).

The song contains an eight-second-long spoken-word introduction, indicative of and related to the content of the subsequent music. It an excerpt taken from the highly acclaimed 1993 gangster film, A Bronx Tale. The speaker's voice is that of Robert De Niro, who in the film, plays the role of Lorenzo Anello.

== Music video ==
On August 17, 2012, 50 Cent released the official lyric video for the song via the site Rap Genius, where he also explained the lyrics of it. The lyric video featured scenes from others clips by him and Dr. Dre. It also features scenes from New York City such as Times Square. No official music video confirmed yet. Another lyric video was uploaded to 50 Cent's YouTube channel on August 24, 2012.

In an interview with Hot 97's Angie Martinez, 50 Cent spoke on several topics including the death of his manager, Chris Lighty as well as "New Day"'s conception and its accompanying music video that was supposed to begin filming in September 2012:

I had the record for like four months. Originally the record was recorded for Detox. [Alicia's version] sounds similar, but Swizz reproduced the entire track. We were actually scheduled to shoot a video and then the Chris Lighty situation took place.

The song and video has received over 14 million views on YouTube.

== Live performances ==
50 Cent performed the song in Dubai at Atelier Live Music Festival, with Tony Yayo, Kidd Kidd, Precious Paris and DJ Whoo Kid.

== Track listing ==
Digital download

1. "New Day" (featuring Alicia Keys and Dr. Dre) – 4:24

== Credits and personnel ==
Credits adapted from Billboard chart listing.

- Songwriter – Curtis Jackson, Andre Young, Kasseem Dean, Alicia Keys, Ryan D. Montgomery, Marshall Mathers, T. Lawrence Jr., Andrew Brissett, Amber Streeter
- Production – Dr. Dre
- Mixing – Eminem

== Charts ==
Chart (2012)	Peak position
Australia (ARIA)	44
Canada Hot 100 (Billboard)	43
France (SNEP)	109
Germany (GfK)	53
Japan (Japan Hot 100)	52
Netherlands (Dutch Top 40 Tipparade)	14
Netherlands (Single Top 100)	92
Slovakia Airplay (ČNS IFPI)	31
US Billboard Hot 100	79
US Hot R&B/Hip-Hop Songs (Billboard)	43

== Radio and release history ==
Country	Date	Format	Label	Ref.
Canada	July 30, 2012	Digital download	Shady, Aftermath, Interscope	
United States	July 30, 2012	Digital download	Shady, Aftermath, Interscope	
United States	August 14, 2012	Rhythmic contemporary radio	Shady, Aftermath, Interscope	
United States	August 14, 2012	Urban contemporary radio	Shady, Aftermath, Interscope	
United States	August 28, 2012	Contemporary hit radio	Shady, Aftermath, Interscope	
