= Better You, Better Me =

Single by Alicia Keys
- Released: October 11, 2013
- Label: RCA

Alicia Keys singles chronology
"Tears Always Win" (2013)	"Better You, Better Me" (2013)	"I Will Pray (Pregherò)" (2013)

"Better You, Better Me" is a song by American singer and songwriter Alicia Keys. The song is featured in The Inevitable Defeat of Mister & Pete, a film about two inner-city boys living on their own in New York City and directed by George Tillman, Jr and starring Skylan Brooks, Ethan Dizon, Jennifer Hudson and Anthony Mackie. The film features an original score from Keys and Mark Isham. The song was released through RCA Records as a single on October 11, 2013. Music videos for the song was released on the DVD release of the film.

== Composition and lyrics ==
The song was written by Keys, Marsha Ambrosius and Ron Haney. Musically, "Better You, Better Me" is a midtempo song, and according to ThisisRnB, is "led by marching drums". Describing its composition, Sam Lansky from Idolator observed its "skittering backbeat and inspirational lyrics". Brittany Lewis from Global Grind also found the lyrics inspirational and described the song as a "a drum-riddled ballad". The song was found to be "powerful" as Keys sings: "I know I’m gonna make it/ I’ve come too far to lose it/ I’ve gotta stay focused and find a better me". According to Rap-Up, the song features a "drum-patterned beat" while the lyrics "provide[] some words of encouragement".

Brian Josephs from The Boombox wrote that "The song has the minor key violins and the marching drum patterns to evoke emotion". In an interview with CBS This Morning, Keys explained that the song "speaks to all of the troubles that you have, and all the feelings that you realize when you're looking everywhere, but inside of yourself for everything that you need". On the song, Keys sings: "I searched the world for the answers/But I've been searching too far/Because I've been here all along".

== Critical reception ==
The song received a positive response from music critics. Keithan Samuels from Rated R&B called it "inspirational" while Hip-Hop-N-More called it "uplifting". Sam Lansky from Idolator commented that while the "effort is no “Try Sleeping with a Broken Heart" it is a "perfectly respectable" song. Rose Lilah from HotNewHipHop felt that the song is a "fine addition" to Keys's discography. Edwin Ortiz from Complex noted the song's "warm melody" and wrote that "it's a spendid piece of work that highlights self-reflection in the face of doubt. Keys' words here are focused and uplifting, displaying her beautiful vocals that could move mountains. Karas Lamb from Okayplayer called the song "triumphant" while Rap-Up dubbed it "Alicia’s statement record" and further described it being a "motivational anthem". Brian Josephs from The Boombox wrote that "as moody as the instrumentals are, Keys sounds pretty optimistic. Her voice is convicting while her lyrics carry a sense of hope". ThisisRnB wrote that the song is "inspiring and powerful" and features a "captivating vocal from Keys".

== Release history ==
Region	Date	Format	Label	Ref.
Various	October 11, 2013	Digital download; streaming	RCA	
