= List of number-one songs of the 2010s (Slovakia) =

Rádio Top 100 Oficiálna is the official chart of Slovakia, ranking the top songs based on radio airplay as compiled and published weekly by the Slovak national section (SNS IFPI). Beginning in 2010, IFPI Czech Republic took over that responsibility.

Below are the songs that reached number one on the chart from 2010, 2012 to April 2013 and October 2016 to December 2019.

== Number-one songs ==
Issue date	Artist	Song	Weeks at number one
2010
December 22, 2009	Lady Gaga	"Bad Romance"	10
February 17	Kristina	"Horehronie"	5
March 24	Keri Hilson	"I Like"	1
March 31	Kristina	"Horehronie"	1
April 7	Edward Maya and Vika Jigulina	"Stereo Love"	4
May 5	Stromae	"Alors on danse"	11
July 20	David Guetta featuring Fergie	"Gettin' Over You"	3
August 20	Yolanda Be Cool and DCUP	"We No Speak Americano"	5
September 14	Eminem featuring Rihanna	"Love the Way You Lie"	2
September 28	Katy Perry	"Teenage Dream"	1
October 5	Kristina	"V sieti ťa mám"	2
October 19	Eminem featuring Rihanna	"Love The Way You Lie"	1
October 26	Taio Cruz	"Dynamite"	1
November 2	Rihanna	"Only Girl (In the World)"	3
November 23	Enrique Iglesias featuring Nicole Scherzinger	"Heartbeat"	2
December 7	The Black Eyed Peas	"The Time (Dirty Bit)"	3
2012
January 3	Rihanna featuring Calvin Harris	"We Found Love"	2
January 17	Maroon 5 featuring Christina Aguilera	"Moves like Jagger"	1
January 24	Pitbull featuring Chris Brown	"International Love"	3
February 14	Don Omar and Lucenzo	"Danza Kuduro	2
February 28	Avicii	"Levels"	4
March 27	Pitbull featuring Chris Brown	"International Love"	1
April 3	Zuzana Smatanová	"Dvere"	1
April 10	Foster the People	"Pumped Up Kicks"	1
April 17	Peter Bič Project	"Hey Now"	1
April 24	Avicii	"Levels"	1
May 1	Peter Bič Project	"Hey Now"	1
May 8	Gotye featuring Kimbra	"Somebody That I Used to Know"	1
May 15	Peter Bič Project	"Hey Now"	1
May 22	Flo Rida	"Whistle"	1
May 29	Peter Bič Project	"Hey Now"	2
June 12	Kelly Clarkson	"Stronger (What Doesn't Kill You)"	1
June 19	Gotye featuring Kimbra	"Somebody That I Used to Know"	4
July 17	Carly Rae Jepsen	"Call Me Maybe"	10
September 25	Ego featuring Robert Burian	"Žijeme len raz"	3
October 16	DJ Antoine	"Ma Chérie"	1
October 23	Loreen	"Euphoria"	4
November 20	will.i.am featuring Eva Simons	"This Is Love"	1
November 27	Ego featuring Robert Burian	"Žijeme len raz"	1
December 4	Pink	"Try	1
December 11	Rihanna	"Diamonds"	1
December 18	Alicia Keys	"Girl on Fire"	3
2013
January 8	Rihanna	"Diamonds"	2
January 23	Asaf Avidan	"One Day / Reckoning Song"	4
February 19	Bruno Mars	"Locked Out of Heaven"	1
February 26	Asaf Avidan	"One Day / Reckoning Song"	1
March 5	Bruno Mars	"Locked Out of Heaven"	2
March 19	Nela	"So In Love"	1
March 26	James Arthur	"Impossible"	1
April 2	Bruno Mars	"Locked Out of Heaven"	1
April 9	Pink featuring Nate Ruess	"Just Give Me a Reason"	9
2016
February 15	Adele	"Hello"	2
March 14	Justin Bieber	"Love Yourself"	2
October 31	Álvaro Soler	"Sofia"	1
November 7	Imany	"Don't Be So Shy"	2
November 14	Álvaro Soler	"Sofia"	2
November 28	Rag'n'Bone Man	"Human"	1
December 5	Álvaro Soler	"Sofia"	1
December 12	LP	"Lost on You"	6
2017
January 23	Rag'n'Bone Man	"Human"	5
February 27	Ed Sheeran	"Shape of You"	1
March 6	Robbie Williams	"Love My Life"	1
March 13	Ed Sheeran	"Shape of You"	1
March 20	Rag'n'Bone Man	"Human"	1
March 27	Ed Sheeran	"Shape of You"	11
June 12	Luis Fonsi and Daddy Yankee	"Despacito"	1
June 19	The Chainsmokers and Coldplay	"Something Just Like This"	2
July 3	Rag'n'Bone Man	"Skin"	1
July 10	Peter Bič Project	"Where Did You Go"	3
July 31	Rag'n'Bone Man	"Skin"	2
August 14	Ed Sheeran	"Galway Girl"	4
September 4	Alle Farben and Janieck	"Hollywood"	1
September 11	Ed Sheeran	"Galway Girl"	2
September 25	Pink	"What About Us"	2
October 9	Welshly Arms	"Legendary"	1
October 16	Emma Drobná	"Words"	3
November 6	Pink	"What About Us"	1
November 13	Ed Sheeran	"Perfect"	1
November 20	Emma Drobná	"Words"	1
November 27	Ed Sheeran	"Perfect"	5
2018
January 1	Portugal. The Man	"Feel It Still"	1
January 8	Ed Sheeran	"Perfect"	2
January 22	Portugal. The Man	"Feel It Still"	1
January 29	Camila Cabello featuring Young Thug	"Havana"	1
February 5	Ed Sheeran	"Perfect"	1
February 12	Camila Cabello featuring Young Thug	"Havana"	2
February 26	Imagine Dragons	"Whatever It Takes	3
March 19	Luis Fonsi and Demi Lovato	"Échame la Culpa"	2
April 2	Imagine Dragons	"Whatever It Takes"	5
May 7	Justin Timberlake	"Say Something"	1
May 14	Zayn and Sia	"Dusk Till Dawn"	1
May 21	Lost Frequencies and Zonderling	"Crazy"	1
May 28	Rita Ora	"Anywhere"	2
June 11	Álvaro Soler	"La Cintura"	2
June 25	David Guetta and Sia	"Flames"	3
July 16	Álvaro Soler	"La Cintura"	2
July 30	David Guetta and Sia	"Flames"	4
August 27	Lost Frequencies and Zonderling	"Crazy"	1
September 3	David Guetta and Sia	"Flames"	6
October 22	Maroon 5	"Girls Like You"	2
November 5	Dynoro and Gigi D'Agostino	"In My Mind"	5
December 10	Lady Gaga and Bradley Cooper	"Shallow"	1
December 17	Dynoro and Gigi D'Agostino	"In My Mind"	1
December 24	Lady Gaga and Bradley Cooper	"Shallow"	2
2019
January 7	Dynoro and Gigi D'Agostino	"In My Mind"	1
January 14	Imagine Dragons	"Natural"	2
January 28	Dynoro and Gigi D'Agostino	"In My Mind"	1
February 4	Imagine Dragons	"Natural"	8
April 1	Ava Max	"Sweet but Psycho"	5
May 6	Mark Ronson featuring Miley Cyrus	"Nothing Breaks Like a Heart"	8
July 1	Imagine Dragons	"Bad Liar"	6
August 12	Dermot Kennedy	"Power Over Me"	1
August 19	Shawn Mendes and Camila Cabello	"Señorita"	11
November 4	Ed Sheeran and Justin Bieber	"I Don't Care"	1
November 11	Tones and I	"Dance Monkey"	3
December 2	Tiësto, Jonas Blue and Rita Ora	"Ritual"	1
December 9	Tones and I	"Dance Monkey"	7

== See also ==
- 2010s in music
- List of number-one songs of the 2010s (Czech Republic)
