= List of number-one international songs of 2012 (South Korea) =

The international Gaon Digital Chart is a chart that ranks the best-performing international songs in South Korea. The data is collected by the Korea Music Content Association. Below is a list of songs that topped the weekly, monthly, and year-end charts, as according to the Gaon 국외 (Foreign) Digital Chart. The Digital Chart ranks songs according to their performance on the Gaon Streaming, Download, BGM, and Mobile charts.

== Weekly chart ==
Week ending	Song	Artist(s)	Reference(s)
January 7	"I Won't Give Up"	Jason Mraz	
January 14	"I Won't Give Up"	Jason Mraz	
January 21	"Livin' My Love"	Steve Aoki featuring LMFAO and Nervo	
January 28	"Livin' My Love"	Steve Aoki featuring LMFAO and Nervo	
February 4	"Livin' My Love"	Steve Aoki featuring LMFAO and Nervo	
February 11	"Be Be Your Love"	Rachael Yamagata	
February 18	"Be Be Your Love"	Rachael Yamagata	
February 25	"Be Be Your Love"	Rachael Yamagata	
March 3	"Live My Life"	Far East Movement featuring Justin Bieber	
March 10	"Rolling in the Deep"	Adele	
March 17	"The Freedom Song"	Jason Mraz	
March 24	"Moves Like Jagger"	Maroon 5 featuring Christina Aguilera	
March 31	"Moves Like Jagger"	Maroon 5 featuring Christina Aguilera	
April 7	"Moves Like Jagger"	Maroon 5 featuring Christina Aguilera	
April 14	"Moves Like Jagger"	Maroon 5 featuring Christina Aguilera	
April 21	"Payphone"	Maroon 5 featuring Wiz Khalifa	
April 28	"Payphone"	Maroon 5 featuring Wiz Khalifa	
May 5	"Payphone"	Maroon 5 featuring Wiz Khalifa	
May 12	"Payphone"	Maroon 5 featuring Wiz Khalifa	
May 19	"Payphone"	Maroon 5 featuring Wiz Khalifa	
May 26	"Payphone"	Maroon 5 featuring Wiz Khalifa	
June 2	"Payphone"	Maroon 5 featuring Wiz Khalifa	
June 9	"Payphone"	Maroon 5 featuring Wiz Khalifa	
June 16	"Payphone"	Maroon 5 featuring Wiz Khalifa	
June 23	"Payphone"	Maroon 5 featuring Wiz Khalifa	
June 30	"One More Night"	Maroon 5	
July 7	"One More Night"	Maroon 5	
July 14	"One More Night"	Maroon 5	
July 21	"One More Night"	Maroon 5	
July 28	"One More Night"	Maroon 5	
August 4	"One More Night"	Maroon 5	
August 11	"One More Night"	Maroon 5	
August 18	"One More Night"	Maroon 5	
August 25	"One More Night"	Maroon 5	
September 1	"One More Night"	Maroon 5	
September 8	"One More Night"	Maroon 5	
September 15	"Girl on Fire"	Alicia Keys	
September 22	"One More Night"	Maroon 5	
September 29	"One More Night"	Maroon 5	
October 6	"One More Night"	Maroon 5	
October 13	"One More Night"	Maroon 5	
October 20	"One More Night"	Maroon 5	
October 27	"One More Night"	Maroon 5	
November 3	"One More Night"	Maroon 5	
November 10	"Miss Right"	Ne-Yo	
November 17	"Miss Right"	Ne-Yo	
November 21	"Call Me Maybe"	Carly Rae Jepsen	
November 28	"Tears Always Win"	Alicia Keys	
December 8	"Tears Always Win"	Alicia Keys	
December 15	"Young Girls"	Bruno Mars	
December 22	"Young Girls"	Bruno Mars	
December 29	"One Day More"	Les Misérables Cast	

== Monthly charts ==
Month	Song	Artist(s)	Reference(s)
January	"I Won't Give Up"	Jason Mraz	
February	"Be Be Your Love"	Rachael Yamagata	
March	"Moves Like Jagger"	Maroon 5 featuring Christina Aguilera	
April	"Payphone"	Maroon 5 featuring Wiz Khalifa	
May	"Payphone"	Maroon 5 featuring Wiz Khalifa	
June	"Payphone"	Maroon 5 featuring Wiz Khalifa	
July	"One More Night"	Maroon 5	
August	"One More Night"	Maroon 5	
September	"One More Night"	Maroon 5	
October	"One More Night"	Maroon 5	
November	"Call Me Maybe"	Carly Rae Jepsen	
December	"Tears Always Win"	Alicia Keys	

== Year-end chart ==
Rank	Song	Artist(s)	Total Downloads
1	"Payphone"	Maroon 5 featuring Wiz Khalifa	2,062,177
2	"Moves Like Jagger"	Maroon 5 featuring Christina Aguilera	2,229,057
3	"Rolling In the Deep"	Adele	1,839,509
4	"One More Night"	Maroon 5	1,526,552
5	"Livin' My Love"	LMFAO & Steve Aoki	1,426,314
6	"I Won't Give Up"	Jason Mraz	1,452,256
7	"Party Rock Anthem"	LMFAO featuring Lauren Bennett & GoonRock	1,218,812
8	"Sex Appeal"	Bueno Clinic	1,013,466
9	"Call Me Maybe"	Carly Rae Jepsen	752,956
10	"Be Be Your Love"	Rachael Yamagata	1,035,114
