= Johnny Socko =

- Origin: Bloomington, Indiana, United States
- Genres: Third wave ska, ska punk, indie rock
- Years active: 1990 - 2003
- Labels: Triple R Records; B.I.B., Asian Man Records, Scarab

Johnny Socko was an American third wave ska band formed in Bloomington, Indiana, United States, in 1990. It was founded by Joseph Welch, Mike Wiltrout, and Steve Mascari. Welch recruited Dylan Wissing at a musical instrument store in Bloomington where they both worked. Wissing recruited Eric Evans (trumpet), who in turn recruited Dave Sterner (Alto sax), and Al Batton (trombone). Soon after, Josh Silbert (sax) and Charlie Krone (trombone) replaced Sterner and Batton respectively. Originally signed to BiB Records and later Asian Man Records, they later started their own record label, Triple R Records. Their first album, Bovaquarium, was described by music critic Marc D. Allan of the Indianapolis Star as "intricately written and brilliantly arranged and performed." Johnny Socko performed everywhere from the legendary Whiskey-a-go-go in Hollywood, California to the infamous CBGBs, Lion's Den, and Limelight in Manhattan. They were known as a band that toured heavily, having performed over 2,000 shows since their inception, but stopped touring in 2003. One of their songs, "Full Trucker Effect", is used in its entirety as part of the introduction to the Bubba The Love Sponge show on Sirius Satellite Radio. The band takes its name from Johnny Sokko and his Flying Robot, a 1960s Japanese action television show.

Michael "Trout" Wiltrout, the group's original vocalist, has since formed The Leisure Kings with Sean Baker. He also provides lead vocals for the bands Mr. Sparkle and The Impalas. Joey Welch, the group's original guitarist, has since formed the Born Again Floozies (Formerly including Charlie Krone as well) and continues to work with the Las Vegas Body Snatchers. Chris Smail, Charlie Krone, Josh Silbert, and Matt Wilson now play as a punk/powerpop band called Coolidge. Saxophonist Josh Silbert also plays in the Impalas with Wiltrout and Wilson, and fronts the electronic/experimental band ESW. Eric Evans was the original trumpet player and toured and recorded with the band for the first four years. Before that, he toured internationally with Ringling Brother's Barnum Bailey Circus and on cruise ships. Evans plays with a number of projects including funk/soul band The Hollywood Getdown and fronts his funk/jazz group, The Raoul Duke Jazz All-Stars.

The original line-up of the band reunited for one night to open the 2009 Broad Ripple Music Fest on October 16, 2009. The performance received the top honor in The Indianapolis Star's Metromix readers' poll. The original lineup reunited again October 18 and 19, 2013 in Bloomington, Indiana at The Bluebird

== Influence ==
Johnny Socko was influenced by the American rock band Red Hot Chili Peppers whose musical style primarily consists of rock with an emphasis on funk, as well as Fishbone, which plays a fusion of ska, punk rock, funk, hard rock and soul.

== Discography ==
=== Studio albums ===
- Bovaquarium (1994, B.I.B.)
- Oh I Do Hope It's Roast Beef (1996, B.I.B.)
- Full Trucker Effect (1997, Asian Man Records)
- Quatro (1999, Scarab)
- Johnny Socko (2002, Triple R)

=== Live albums ===
- Double Live (2001, Scarab)

== Members ==
- Joe Welch (guitars, vocals)
- Michael Wiltrout (vocals)
- Steve Mascari (bass guitar)
- Dylan Wissing (drums)
- Eric Evans (trumpet)
- Joshua Silbert (saxophone, vocals)
- Charlie Krone (trombone)
- Demian Hostetter (trumpet, vocals)
- Matt Wilson (bass guitar, vocals)
- Chris Smail (guitar, vocals)
- Rob Henson (bass guitar)
- Eric Lenington (trombone & bass guitar)
- Al Batton (trombone)
- Dave Sterner (alto sax)
- Nils Fredland (trombone)
- Jeremy Radway (bass guitar)
- Philip Williams (bass guitar)

== Related projects ==
- Born Again Floozies
- Coolidge
- ESW
- Hush
- Las Vegas Body Snatchers
- The Leisure Kings
