= Tears Always Win =

Single by Alicia Keys

from the album Girl on Fire
- Released: May 7, 2013
- Studio: Oven Studios (New York, New York)
- Genre: Pop; R&B
- Length: 3:59 (album version); 3:38 (single version)
- Label: RCA
- Songwriters: Alicia Keys; Jeff Bhasker; Bruno Mars; Phillip Lawrence
- Producers: Jeff Bhasker; Alicia Keys

Alicia Keys singles chronology
"Fire We Make" (2013)	"Tears Always Win" (2013)	"Better You, Better Me" (2013)

Music video
- "Tears Always Win" on YouTube

"Tears Always Win" is a song recorded by American singer-songwriter Alicia Keys for her fifth studio album, Girl on Fire (2012). It was written by Keys, along with Bruno Mars, Jeff Bhasker and Phillip Lawrence, and produced by Keys and Bhasker. It was digitally released on May 7, 2013, as the fifth single from Girl on Fire. Keys debuted the single during a performance on American Idol on May 9, 2013. The song had positive critical reaction. Keys included the song in the setlist for her fifth concert tour, the Set the World on Fire Tour. It is being released as the second Top 40/Mainstream single following the lead single "Girl on Fire". Keys also performed the song on the May 9, 2013 episode of American Idol.

== Background and release ==
Girl on Fire is Keys' fifth studio album and a follow-up to The Element of Freedom (2009). It is her first release under RCA Records, after a re-organization at parent company Sony Music Entertainment led to her previous label J Records roster being absorbed into RCA. After 2009, Keys married record producer and rapper Swizz Beatz, became a mother, began co-managing her own career, produced and directed both a Broadway Play and short film, in addition to designing a line of trainers for Reebok. Keys revealed the inspiration behind the song during one of her live performances while on tour, stating, "Some things don't always work out the way that you wish that they would, but [...] you have to give it a try, and at the very least, I have a song for that too." It was digitally released on May 7, 2013, through the iTunes Store and serves as the fifth single from Girl on Fire. Keys officially debuted the single during her performance of the song on American Idol on May 9, 2013. The single was supposed to impact Top 40/Mainstream radio in the U.S. on July 1, 2013, however, its release was scrapped at the last minute. This is the third push back of the song to radio, it previously had two impact dates: May 21, 2013 and June 11, 2013.

== Critical reception ==
The song was met with general critical acclaim. While Allmusic did not name it one of the standout tracks on the album, they reacted positively to it. Billboard said of the song, "In Keys' hands alone, this missing-my-baby ballad might have fallen victim to overly sappy platitudes about life on the road without her man by her side. But with a little help from Bhasker and songwriting partners Bruno Mars and The Smeezingtons, "Tears Always Win" becomes an anthemic, soaring winner worthy of Keys' heroes Prince and Stevie Wonder." Rap-Up also reacted positively to the track and deemed it a highlight of the album. The co-writing credits shared partially by Bruno Mars and Philip Lawrence was met positively, with some critics, BET in particular, saying, "this song has a nice doo-wop touch, a welcome turn with the album sometimes threatening to veer towards Alicia's middle-of-the-road R&B comfort zone."

== Chart performance ==
Upon release the album Girl on Fire, "Tears Always Win" debuted at the top of the South Korean Gaon Chart for international singles with 56,340 sold. That same week, every song on the album charted in South Korea. The following week it remained at number one with 62,799 units sold. In its third week, it dropped to number two with 46,212 sold and to number three in its fourth week with sales of 40,825. In 2013, "Tears Always Win" charted for a further 24 weeks on the South Korean Gaon International Download chart, selling 285,213 units. Between 2012 and 2013, "Tears Always Win" sold 531,161 units in South Korea. Following Keys' announcement that the song would be a single and its debut live performance on season twelve of American Idol, "Tears Always Win" sold 15,000 copies in the United States.

== Music video ==
The official video for "Tears Always Win" was filmed in May 2013 by director Robert Hales. The video was released June 13, 2013.

== Charts ==
Chart (2012–13)	Peak position
Belgium (Ultratip Bubbling Under Flanders)	67
Belgium (Ultratip Bubbling Under Wallonia)	26
South Korean International Singles (Gaon)	1
U.S. Bubbling Under R&B/Hip-Hop (Billboard)	3
U.S. R&B/Hip-Hop Digital Songs (Billboard)	28

== See also ==
- List of number-one international songs of 2012 (South Korea)

== Release history ==
Region	Date	Format
United States	May 7, 2013	Digital download
Italy	June 14, 2013	Contemporary hit radio
United States	July 1, 2013	Contemporary hit radio
