= Girl on Fire (song) =

2012 single by Alicia Keys

Single by Alicia Keys

from the album Girl on Fire
- Released: September 4, 2012
- Recorded: 2012
- Studio: Jungle City (New York); Oven Studios (New York); Record Plant (Los Angeles)
- Genre: R&B
- Length: 3:44
- Label: RCA
- Songwriters: Alicia Keys; Salaam Remi; Jeff Bhasker; Billy Squier
- Producers: Alicia Keys; Jeff Bhasker; Salaam Remi

Alicia Keys singles chronology
"New Day" (2012)	"Girl on Fire" (2012)	"Brand New Me" (2012)

Music video
- "Girl on Fire" on YouTube

"Girl on Fire" is a song recorded by American singer-songwriter Alicia Keys for her fifth studio album of the same name. Keys co-wrote and co-produced the R&B ballad with Jeff Bhasker and Salaam Remi. The song contains an interpolation of the drums from the 1980 song "The Big Beat" by American rock guitarist Billy Squier, who received a writing credit on "Girl on Fire". Released on September 4, 2012, as the lead single from the album, "Girl on Fire" is Keys' first release under RCA Records following the closure of J Records, after a reorganization at Sony Music Entertainment.

"Girl on Fire" was inspired by Keys' giving birth to her son Egypt and marriage to her husband Swizz Beatz. Keys recorded a three-track suite for the song, consisting of the main version in addition to two remixes. The first remix, titled "Inferno", adds two new verses from American hip hop artist Nicki Minaj, whilst the second mix titled "Bluelight" strips back the drums and piano leaving a sparse bass-led production and re-recorded "smokey" vocals. "Girl on Fire" opened to widespread universal acclaim from critics, with many praising Keys' vocals and the song's production. Keys performed "Girl on Fire" for the first time at the 2012 MTV Video Music Awards on September 6, 2012, where she was joined by Minaj and American gymnastics gold-medalist Gabby Douglas. The song has been certified six-times platinum by the Recording Industry Association of America.

== Background and release ==
"Girl on Fire" is the lead single and title track from Alicia Keys' fifth studio album, Girl on Fire (2012). Alongside the main single, Keys recorded two other versions: the Inferno Remix which features new verses from Nicki Minaj, and a Bluelight Remix which strips back the vocals and production from the main single. Gerrick Kennedy from the LA Times spoke of the multiple versions of the song commenting that the main single was most likely made for pop radio, but noted that Minaj's verses on the Inferno Remix would probably get noticed more. On being able to premiere her new song at the 2012 MTV Video Music Awards, Keys said,

Debuting a new song at the VMAs is definitely special. I debuted 'No One' at the VMAs — it was the first time anyone in the world heard 'No One,' Keys said. "It's the perfect setting. It's the right energy. It's the right vibe. People are so excited about the night of music and hearing different styles that it just goes over really well. I can't wait!

== Music and lyrics ==
=== Main version ===
"Girl on Fire" is a midtempo song written by Keys, Jeff Bhasker, Salaam Remi and American rock guitarist Billy Squier. Squier earns a writing credit for the inclusion of an interpolation of the drums from his 1980 song "The Big Beat". The chorus of Eddie Holman's 1970 hit song "Hey There Lonely Girl" is also interpolated in the bridge. ("She's a lonely girl, and it's a lonely world") "Girl on Fire" uses common time and is set to a "heavy beat" at a tempo of 93 beats per minute and is in the key of A major. Keys' vocals range in the song over an octave from a low note of C♯_{4} up to a high note of E_{5}. On the main single, Keys opens the songs with the lyrics "She got both feet on the ground and she's burning it down. She got her head in the clouds and she's not backing down. This girl is on fire!" Keys' lyrics centre around toasting the "achievements of women everywhere", particularly with the hook "She's just a girl and she's on fire", which according to MTV's Rob Markman is delivered with a "calming-yet-commanding wail". Markman also spoke of the pace of the song, describing it as "pulsating". LA Times' Gerrick Kennedy expanded further describing the songs components as "a fierce battlecry over a fast-building simplistic hook". Critics likened "Girl on Fire" to Keys' previous singles "No One" (2007) and "Try Sleeping with a Broken Heart" (2009). Throwing "If I Ain't Got You" (2004) into the list of comparisons, Erin Thompson from Seattle Weekly said "Girl on Fire" compares to previous Keys' ballads with its "quiet, unassuming verses leading into big, empathic choruses."

=== Inferno version ===
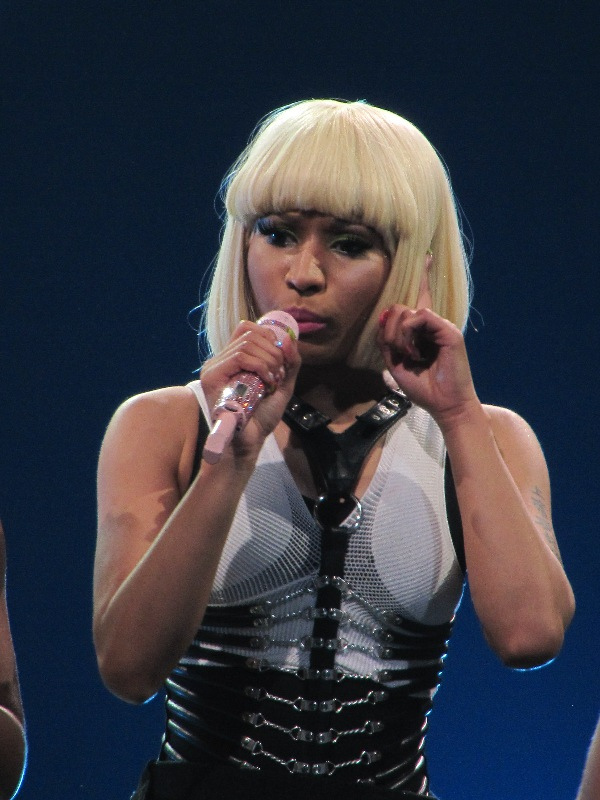
Nicki Minaj is featured on the Inferno version of the song.

The Inferno version features Nicki Minaj, who wrote and rapped two new verses on the song. Minaj's vocals were recorded at Chalice Recording Studios in Los Angeles, California. The inferno remix uses the same production and sample as the main single however, the first two verses of the song were described as "understated" by Carl Williot from Idolator, with Minaj leading the remix with a new rap verse. She raps "Took me on the balcony, telling me to jump with her/ Yeah I'm in the ghost but I ain't doing stunts with her/ I ain't trying to be that, haters want to see that/ But I got 'em aggy, cause I win the gold like Gabby". Minaj also talks about being haunted by the ghost of Marilyn Monroe. In the second verse from Minaj, the subject matter switches to her fans the "Barbz" with the lyric "And to my core fans, keep reppin' me/ Do it till the death of me/ 'X' in the box, cause ain't nobody checkin' me." Markman noted that in this verse, Minaj switched her delivery style to "more of a whisper". Entertainment Weekly's Kyle Anderson described Minaj's verses as "more prominent" than Keys' and noted that the production was influenced by garage music.

=== Bluelight version ===
By contrast, the Bluelight version features a slower production and re-recorded vocals. According to the Los Angeles Times' Gerrick Kennedy, the Bluelight remix has a production based on "dripping" synths and "light" chord progressions. Kennedy particularly noted a difference in Keys' vocal tone, describing it as "smokey" and comparable to that seen on Keys' 2009 single "Un-Thinkable (I'm Ready)". Mark Edward Nero from About.com also compared the "Girl on Fire" to Keys' single "You Don't Know My Name" (2003). Idolator's Carl Williot described how on this stripped version, "gone is Minaj, gone are the piano plinks and gone are the martial drums" completely changing the composition of the Bluelight version. Williot described how Keys' vocals take on a "more emotional performance" while the melody is replaced with "faint bass drops and a hushed drum machine".

== Reception ==
=== Critical response ===
The song received universal acclaim. Jon Pareles from the New York Times described "Girl on Fire" and the previously released song "New Day" as "booming anthems" and the complete opposite to Girl on Fire's ballads which feature just Keys' vocals and a piano. Rob Markman from MTV's RapFix blog described "Girl on Fire" as a "high-powered Alicia ballad" just like previous singles "No One" and "Try Sleeping with a Broken Heart". Agreeing with those comparisons was Gerrick Kennedy from the LA Times who went on to describe the main single as a "sweeping ballad with powerful vocals and an anthemic hook". Then commenting on the remixes Kennedy said that on the Inferno remix, Minaj's "fluid verses" and an "added thump" might make that version of the song get noticed more, while it's the Bluelight version Kennedy called the "most intoxicating". On the latter, Kennedy said "it would be unfortunate to overlook" due to Keys' sensual vocal tone. Kyle Anderson from Entertainment Weekly commented that the "hook was weak" and that Minaj verses were much stronger, supporting the song.

By contrast, Charley Rogulewski from Vibe said it was "Keys who stands out on the track. [She] lays down powerful and flawless vocals over her trademark piano punches and a trash-can-lid beat." Erin Thompson from Seattle Weekly praised Keys' on the song for making the "often cheesy" girl-power theme seem "genuinely stirring and elegant", commenting that "only Alicia Keys could do it". Describing the chorus of the song, Thompson said "it booms with thudding drums as her drawn-out notes soar on top. It's heavily bombastic, but the drama of it makes it memorable, and the hooky melody is beautiful and exhilarating. Keys seems to have to set out to make a statement song about power, and it's undeniable that she's succeeded in that". Speaking of the song's inferno remix, Idolator's Carl Williot agreed with previous reviewers particularly noting Keys' vocals, using term "trademark soaring vocals" to describe Keys' performance on the song.

=== Commercial performance ===
In the chart week ending September 7, 2012, "Girl on Fire" debuted on the US Hot R&B/Hip-Hop Songs chart at number 67. This in part was driven by 2.1 million radio impressions according to Nielsen BDS. The song rose to number seven in its fifth week, becoming her fifteenth Top 10 hit on the Billboard Hot R&B/Hip-Hop Songs chart, peaking at number 2 behind Rihanna's Diamonds. It has peaked at number 11 on the Billboard Hot 100 chart and has sold 2 million copies in the United States as of February 13, 2013. The song has also become an international hit for Keys as well for Minaj, reaching number one in Austria, South Korea, and Slovakia, the Top 5 in the Netherlands, Brazil, Israel, Denmark, Japan, Germany, Switzerland, France, and the United Kingdom, and a Top 20 hit in the US, Australia, Belgium, Canada, Czech Republic, Ireland, New Zealand, Norway, Scotland, Italy, Finland, Hungary, and Spain.

The song was included in a popular Brazilian soap opera, Salve Jorge, which contributed for the success in Brazil. It was also featured in the credits for Borderlands 3.

== Music videos ==
The music video for the song, premiered on BET's 106 & Park on October 19, 2012, and was directed by Sophie Muller. The video portrays Keys as a working mother caring for her kids and an elderly mother, has received wide acclaim from critics. Christopher Farley from the Wall Street Journal was of the opinion that Keys is making 21st-century domesticity sexy, and is "an intriguing move for a pop-soul star". Rolling Stone magazine says Keys "applies glamour and magic to household chores", and made reference to Mary Poppins being an inspiration in the videos magic scene.

The video for the Inferno remix was uploaded to VEVO on November 2, 2012. It is much the same video as the main version but with Minaj's scenes pasted in the video. In Minaj's first verse, she appears in front of a red and black wall wearing a black and white outfit. In Minaj's second verse, we see her rapping on a TV screen wearing a black outfit and having a starry night sky behind her. A completely new video was released for Japan in January 2013.

== Live performances ==
Keys performed "Girl on Fire" for the first time at 2012 MTV Video Music Awards on September 6, 2012, at the Staples Center in Los Angeles, California. She was joined by Nicki Minaj who rapped her verses from the Inferno Remix of the song as well as the 2012 Summer Olympics gymnastics gold medalist Gabby Douglas who performed during the second half of the song. The Team USA female gymnasts performed a brief routine while Keys was introduced to the stage. Keys was dressed in a "pewter-colored top and black form-fitting tights." Minaj was dressed in a "black hooded top and bright blonde wig". During the performance, Keys began stood up at a keyboard before walking down the steps to the main stage. It was only after Minaj rapped the line "But I got 'em aggy, cause I win the gold like Gabby", Douglas appear on stage with a brief routine containing cartwheels, jumps and back handsprings. American Superstar magazine described the performance a "true TV performance" thanks in part Minaj and Douglas, as well as "Keys hit[ting] many high notes — and then some". The magazine concluded that the performance was "sexy, yet intimate". Jack Antonoff, guitarist of indie band fun., said he thought Keys' performance could be "that performance that people will be talking about for 10 years". VH1's Sabrina Rojas Weiss agreed, stating that it was "just due to Keys' soaring vocals" but also Douglas' surprise appearance.

"Girl on Fire" was performed on ITunes Festival on September 28, 2012. Keys performed the song live on the UK version of The X Factor on November 18. On November 12, 2012, Alicia Performed New Music like "Girl On Fire" and another new song off her upcoming album titled "Brand New Me" + Our Favorites On VH1 Storytellers. On November 11, 2012, Alicia took the MTV Europe Music Awards stage by storm with a jaw-dropping performance of her new songs "New Day" and "Girl On Fire" On November 20 at 7:00 PM EST, Alicia exclusively performed on YouTube Live Stream with Google+ Hangout, also premiering her new album, "Girl on Fire" for the very first time. The "Girl On Fire" singer performed on November 26, 2012, on Good Morning America, as well as November 29, 2012, on The X Factor USA. On January 21, 2013, Keys sang the song with modified lyrics during President Barack Obama's Inaugural Balls, which celebrated his second term. On January 25, 2013, Keys did a medley of the song with "New Day" and "Brand New Me" at Los Premios 40 Principales in Spain. The next day, she sang "Girl on Fire" in Cannes, France, during the NRJ Music Awards. At the 2013 Grammy Awards, she performed the song and "Daylight" with Maroon 5. The song is performed on The Alicia + Keys World Tour.

== Cover versions ==
In September 2012, Misha B covered the track. One critic described the acoustic cover as that "awkward moment when someone sings your new song better than you". American drag queens Willam Belli, Detox and Vicky Vox released a parody of the song titled "Boy Is a Bottom" on January 26, 2013. Willam Belli later on released a Spanish version of "Boy Is a Bottom" called "Es Una Pasiva" on January 13, 2015. In 2021, Halsey covered the track for the 2021 film Sing 2, in which she voices Porsha.

== Use in media ==
In March 2023, Lloyds Bank began airing a television commercial in the United Kingdom which heavily used "Girl on Fire" as the advert's soundtrack. The song saw increased popularity in that country, and, on 24 March 2023, "Girl on Fire" peaked at number 14 on the UK Singles Downloads Chart.

== Track listings ==
- Digital Single
1. "Girl on Fire" (Main Version) – 3:44
- Digital Single – Inferno
1. "Girl on Fire" (Inferno Version; featuring Nicki Minaj) – 4:30
- Digital Single – Bluelight
1. "Girl on Fire" (Bluelight Version) – 4:22
- Germany, Austria, and Switzerland CD single
1. "Girl on Fire" – 3:44
2. "Girl on Fire" (Inferno Version; featuring Nicki Minaj) – 4:30
- Digital EP
1. "Girl on Fire" (Main Version) – 3:44
2. "Girl on Fire" (Inferno Version; featuring Nicki Minaj) – 4:30
3. "Girl on Fire" (Bluelight Version) – 4:22
4. "Girl on Fire" (Instrumental) – 3:45

== Credits and personnel ==
Recording

- Recorded at Jungle City Studios (NYC), Oven Studios (NYC) & The Record Plant (Los Angeles, CA)

Personnel

- Producer, writer, lead & background vocals – Alicia Keys
- Producer, writer, CP-70 piano, organ – Jeff Bhasker
- Producer, writer, drum-programming – Salaam Remi
- Writer – Billy Squier
- Big drums – Dylan Wissing
- Engineered and recorded by Ann Mincieli
- Big drums engineered by Ken Lewis
- Assistant engineers – Val Brathwaite, Ramon Rivas, Ghazi Hourani
- Mixed by Manny Marroquin
- Mix assistant – Chris Galland

== Charts ==
=== Weekly charts ===
Weekly chart performance for "Girl on Fire"
Chart (2012–13)	Peak position
Australia (ARIA)	12
Australia Urban (ARIA)	2
Austria (Ö3 Austria Top 40)	1
Belgium (Ultratop 50 Flanders)	6
Belgium (Ultratop 50 Wallonia)	6
Brazil (Crowley Broadcast Analysis)	3
Canada Hot 100 (Billboard)	6
Canada AC (Billboard)	11
Canada CHR/Top 40 (Billboard)	18
Canada Hot AC (Billboard)	7
Czech Republic Airplay (ČNS IFPI)	8
Denmark (Tracklisten)	5
Euro Digital Songs (Billboard)	4
Finland (Suomen virallinen lista)	17
France (SNEP)	5
Germany (GfK)	4
Honduras (Honduras Top 50)	48
Hungary (Rádiós Top 40)	6
Hungary (Single Top 40)	7
Iceland (RÚV)	9
Ireland (IRMA)	11
Israel International Airplay (Media Forest)	5
Italy (FIMI)	15
Japan (Billboard Japan Hot 100)	5
Mexico (Billboard Ingles Airplay)	2
Netherlands (Dutch Top 40)	5
Netherlands (Single Top 100)	5
New Zealand (Recorded Music NZ)	7
Norway (VG-lista)	13
Poland Dance (ZPAV)	49
Portugal Digital Songs (Billboard)	2
Romania (Airplay 100)	7
Scottish Singles Sales (Official Charts)	6
Slovakia Airplay (ČNS IFPI)	1
Slovenia (SloTop50)	36
South Korea Downloads (Gaon International Chart)	1
Spain (Promusicae)	10
Sweden (Sverigetopplistan)	29
Switzerland (Schweizer Hitparade)	5
UK Singles (Official Charts)	5
UK Hip Hop/R&B (Official Charts)	2
US Billboard Hot 100	11
US Adult Contemporary (Billboard)	14
US Adult Pop Airplay (Billboard)	10
US Adult R&B Songs (Billboard)	3
US Dance Club Songs (Billboard)	23
US Pop Airplay (Billboard)	10
US Hot R&B/Hip-Hop Songs (Billboard)	2
US Rhythmic Airplay (Billboard)	15

Weekly chart performance for "Girl on Fire"
Chart (2023–2025)	Peak position
Moldova Airplay (TopHit)	55
UK Singles Downloads (Official Charts)	14

=== Year-end charts ===
2012 year-end chart performance for "Girl on Fire"
Chart (2012)	Position
Austrian Singles Chart	57
Australian Singles Chart	69
Australian Urban Singles Chart	20
Belgian Singles Chart (Flanders)	62
Belgian Singles Chart (Wallonia)	92
Dutch Top 40	25
Dutch Mega Single 100	21
French Singles Chart	56
German Singles Chart	48
Italian FIMI Singles Chart	73
Spanish Airplay Chart	38
Swiss Singles Chart	42
UK Singles Chart	111
US Hot R&B/Hip-Hop Songs	79

2013 year-end chart performance for "Girl on Fire"
Chart (2013)	Position
Australian Urban Singles Chart	19
Austrian Singles Chart	68
Belgian Singles Chart (Flanders)	71
Belgian Singles Chart (Wallonia)	55
Brazil (Crowley)	9
Canada (Canadian Hot 100)	44
Dutch Top 40	86
Germany (Media Control AG)	86
Hungarian Airplay Chart	48
Spanish Airplay Chart	15
Swiss Singles Chart	53
UK Singles Chart	140
US Billboard Hot 100	49
US Adult Contemporary Songs	40
US Adult Pop Songs	44
US Hot R&B/Hip-Hop Songs	12

== Certifications ==
Certifications and sales for "Girl on Fire"
Region	Certification	Certified units/sales
Australia (ARIA)	6× Platinum	420,000^{‡}
Austria (IFPI Austria)	Gold	15,000^{*}
Belgium (BRMA)	Gold	15,000^{*}
Canada (Music Canada)	2× Platinum	160,000^{*}
Denmark (IFPI Danmark)	Platinum	30,000^{^}
Finland (Musiikkituottajat)	Gold	14,713
France (SNEP)	Gold	113,000
Germany (BVMI)	Platinum	300,000^{^}
Italy (FIMI)	Platinum	30,000^{*}
Mexico (AMPROFON)	3× Platinum	180,000^{‡}
Netherlands (NVPI)	Gold	10,000^{^}
New Zealand (RMNZ) Inferno remix	3× Platinum	90,000^{‡}
Portugal (AFP)	Gold	10,000^{‡}
South Korea (Gaon) (Note: Sales from 2012)	—	250,000
Spain (Promusicae)	Platinum	60,000^{‡}
Sweden (GLF)	Platinum	40,000^{‡}
Switzerland (IFPI Switzerland)	Platinum	30,000^{^}
United Kingdom (BPI)	2× Platinum	1,200,000^{‡}
United States (RIAA)	8× Platinum	8,000,000^{‡}
^{*} Sales figures based on certification alone.^{^} Shipments figures based on certification alone.^{‡} Sales+streaming figures based on certification alone.

== See also ==
- List of number-one hits of 2012 (Austria)
- List of singles certified multi-platinum in Australia
- List of number-one pop hits of 2013 (Brazil)
- List of best-selling singles in 2012 (France)
- List of top 10 singles in 2012 (France)
- List of top 10 singles in 2013 (France)
- List of number-one singles of 2013 (Slovakia)
- List of number-one singles of 2012 (Slovakia)
- List of number-one international songs of 2012 (South Korea)
- List of number-one singles of 2012 (Spain)
- List of UK top 10 singles in 2012
- Billboard Year-End Hot 100 singles of 2013

== Radio adds and release history ==
List of radio and release dates, showing country, format, version and record label
Region	Date	Format	Version(s)	Label
France	September 4, 2012	Digital download	Main single; Inferno remix; Bluelight remix	Sony Music
Germany	September 4, 2012	Digital download	Inferno remix	Sony Music
United States	September 4, 2012	Digital download	Main single; Inferno remix; Bluelight remix	RCA Records
United States	September 11, 2012	Rhythmic airplay; Urban airplay	Inferno remix	RCA Records
United States	September 11, 2012	Urban AC airplay	Bluelight remix	RCA Records
United States	October 16, 2012	Mainstream airplay	Main Single; Inferno remix	RCA Records
United States	October 16, 2012	Hot Adult Contemporary airplay	Main Single	RCA Records
Germany	November 2, 2012	CD single	Main single; Inferno remix	Sony Music
United Kingdom	November 18, 2012	Digital EP	Main Single; Bluelight remix; Inferno remix; Instrumental	RCA Records
United States	March 18, 2013	Adult Contemporary airplay	Main Single	RCA Records
