= Girl on Fire (album) =

Studio album by Alicia Keys
- Released: November 22, 2012
- Recorded: 2011–2012
- Studios: Jungle City; Oven (New York City); Geejam (Port Antonio); Chalice; Record Plant (Los Angeles); Metropolis (London)
- Genre: R&B
- Length: 53:08
- Label: RCA
- Producers: Alicia Keys; Babyface; Jeff Bhasker; Antonio Dixon; Dr. Dre; Rodney Jerkins; Malay; Pop & Oak; Salaam Remi; Jamie Smith; Swizz Beatz

Alicia Keys chronology
The Platinum Collection (2010)	Girl on Fire (2012)	VH1 Storytellers (2013)

Singles from Girl on Fire
- 1. "Girl on Fire" Released: September 4, 2012; 2. "Brand New Me" Released: November 19, 2012; 3. "New Day" Released: February 21, 2013; 4. "Fire We Make" Released: March 28, 2013; 5. "Tears Always Win" Released: May 7, 2013

Girl on Fire is the fifth studio album by American singer and songwriter Alicia Keys. It was released on November 22, 2012, being Keys' first release with RCA Records following Sony Music Entertainment's decision to close J Records during a company reshuffle. The album is an R&B album with elements of different musical styles, including rock, electro, reggae and hip-hop. It features a largely minimalist production, includes piano-driven songs and balances traditional R&B with atypical chords and melodic changes.

Upon its release, Girl on Fire received generally positive reviews from music critics. The album debuted at number one on the Billboard 200 with 159,000 copies sold in its first week. It produced five singles: the title track, which peaked at number two on Hot R&B/Hip-Hop Songs and number 11 on the US Billboard Hot 100, "Brand New Me", "New Day", "Fire We Make" (featuring Maxwell), and "Tears Always Win". To further promote the album, Keys embarked on her fifth worldwide concert tour, titled Set the World on Fire Tour, which commenced in March 2013 and ended in December. At the 56th Annual Grammy Awards, Girl on Fire won Best R&B Album, making Keys the most awarded artist in this category, with three wins.

== Background and development ==
Girl on Fire is Keys' fifth studio album and the follow-up to The Element of Freedom (2009). It also serves as her first release under RCA Records, after a reorganization at parent company Sony Music Entertainment led to her previous label J Records being absorbed into RCA. Between the two albums, Keys married record producer and rapper Swizz Beatz, became a mother, began co-managing her own career, produced and directed both a Broadway play and short film, in addition to designing a line of trainers for Reebok. Keys had also either appeared on or produced material for several other artists, including work on Kanye West, Emeli Sandé and Miguel's albums. Essence reported that Keys began working on Girl on Fire in February 2011. Speaking on how the events of the previous three years inspired her, during an interview with Billboard, Keys stated: "These last three years have been the most in every way. The most newest, the most difficult, the most loving, the most dream-filled, the most breaking free . . . an entire crazy dynamic of lessons and emotions to grow into and claim. This whirlwind has definitely forced me to be who I am, to be free enough and brave enough to just not accept anything else—nor try to be anything else."

Speaking on how Girl on Fire was different to The Element of Freedom, Keys said: "I've stepped more into my business and really... taken control for how I want that to be. So every way that I've created now is totally in a new space. It's more in a true space of who I am and what story it is that I'm trying to tell, what it is I'm going through, what the world is going through. And it's really important for me to describe that and say that exactly how I see it, period. So, things are just new. The world is new! Everything feels like brand new to me." Keys even explained that the album title is a slight reference to Katniss Everdeen, the central character in the adventure novel series The Hunger Games, of which she is a fan.

== Recording and production ==
Recording sessions for the album took place at Jungle City Studios and Oven Studios in New York, Chalice Studios and The Record Plant in Los Angeles, Geejam Studios in Jamaica, and Metropolis Studios in London. Keys worked with a range of producers for Girl on Fire, including husband Swizz Beatz, Babyface, Kerry Brothers Jr. and Jeff Bhasker. When working on the album, Keys said she was not inspired by the current rhythmic trends in pop music. "I was really focused on writing, on the crafting of a song, more so than anything else. I didn't care about a beat. I didn't care about a hot track. I didn't even want to hear those things. I wanted to create a song." During a Keep a Child Alive concert in New York City, Keys met blues-rock guitarist Gary Clark Jr. Keys had initially asked Clark, Jr. if he would play the guitar elements from "While My Guitar Gently Weeps" by George Harrison. Seeing potential in Clark, Jr.'s skills, Keys would present him with the song "Fire We Make" and asked him if he could play some guitar on the track. Speaking about the collaboration he said, "I went in and I was like, 'What do you want me to do?' and she was like, 'This is the song. You just do what you do, and we'll see what happens.' It was one of the best studio experiences I've ever had."

== Music and lyrics ==
An R&B album, Girl on Fire has a balance of conventional R&B songs and piano ballads. The album's music is typified by Keys' heightened singing, piano playing, and a minimalist production. It also showcases her attempt at different styles, which range from electro soul and hip-hop to rock and reggae flourishes. The songs are mostly midtempo and feature unconventional chords and melodic changes.

The album's lyrics features aphorisms about relationships and God. A portion of the album's songs have their narrator examining and struggling with a stifling relationship, while others touch on Keys' recent personal life, including marriage and motherhood. Pitchfork's Stephen M. Deusner views Girl on Fire as an album "about rebirth and renewal", writing that Keys "use[s] romantic tragedy as the engine for transformation." James Reed of The Boston Globe writes that its "emphasis on looking inward recalls the mood of Beyoncé's 4."

The quiet opening track "De Novo Adagio", which translates to adagio again, exhibits Keys' classically trained musicianship. "Listen to Your Heart" is one of the album's uptempo songs, taking a dancier direction than Keys' previous material. "Brand New Me", a slow-burning declaration of the narrator's independence, was penned with Scottish singer-songwriter Emeli Sandé, as an autobiographical snapshot of Keys' life. Sandé also helped Keys write the songs "Not Even the King" and "101". On "Brand New Me", Keys sings about finally taking control over a domineering partner. "Not Even the King" is a piano-driven song about "rich love" which is bigger than the entire world, where Keys sings: "They offer the world to have what we got, but I found the world in you."

== Release and promotion ==
In early September 2012, the audio for the song "Not Even the King" was uploaded to Keys' official Vevo channel. On September 24, Keys performed an exclusive set for an MTV event called MTV Crashes Manchester. The set, which took place outside the City Cathedral in Manchester, included a variety of songs from her discography, as well as songs from Girl on Fire. On September 28, she performed several new tracks from the album as well as older hits at the iTunes Festival. On October 16, Keys performed her set at the "City Advantage Love the Journey Concert" at Lincoln Center's Avery Fisher Hall in New York City. On November 12, Keys was featured on an episode of VH1 Storytellers, where she performed both old and new material. Josh Stillman of Entertainment Weekly praised her appearance on the show as a whole: "She carries herself onstage with cool and confidence – not showy or attention-seeking, merely comfortable – and speaks in a voice so smooth you could drape it over your shoulders." He noted that Keys was backed by a six-piece band for songs such as "No One" and "If I Ain't Got You", but stripped the mood down for the "passionate solo renditions" of "Not Even the King" and "Brand New Me".

On November 18, 2012, Keys performed "Girl on Fire" on The X Factor results show. On November 20, Keys streamed a Google+ Hangout on her official YouTube channel live from her studio, to give fans a "guided tour" of the album. When announcing the session, she stated: "hear all the songs on the record [and] I'll be able to share my creative process and also tell you some of the very special and important meanings behind some of the songs." Girl on Fire was released in the United States on November 27, as her first album released by RCA Records. In November 2012, following her performance on The X Factor, Keys announced an eight-date UK and Ireland arena tour, which took place in 2013. Keys also said that she would tour with Miguel beginning in March 2013. On January 10, 2013, Keys announced that she would embark on the Set the World on Fire Tour in North America; tickets went on sale on January 14.

== Singles ==
The album's title song was unveiled on September 4, 2012, as the lead single. Recorded as a three-part suite, "Girl on Fire" was accompanied by its "Inferno" version featuring rapper Nicki Minaj and a "Bluelight" remix featuring Keys singing the song in a stripped-back production. The song was composed by Keys, Jeff Bhasker and Salaam Remi. Rock guitarist Billy Squier is also credited as a writer due to "Girl on Fire" including a music sample of the drum track from his song "The Big Beat" (1980). Keys performed the song for the first time at the 2012 MTV Video Music Awards on September 6, 2012, being joined by Minaj and the 2012 Summer Olympics gymnastics gold medalist Gabby Douglas, who made a special appearance during the performance. In the United States, "Girl on Fire" peaked at number two on the Hot R&B/Hip-Hop Songs and number 11 on the Billboard Hot 100.

On November 19, "Brand New Me", which was co-written with Scottish singer-songwriter Emeli Sandé, impacted the urban adult contemporary radio in the United States as the album's second single.

"New Day" served as the album's third single for international markets only, being sent to radio stations in France on February 21, 2013, in Australia on May 17, and finally in the United Kingdom on May 29.

"Fire We Make", Keys' duet with Maxwell, was serviced to US urban adult contemporary radio stations on March 28 as the fourth single.

The album's fifth single, "Tears Always Win", was released for digital download via iTunes Store on May 7. Keys performed the song on American Idol on May 9.

== Critical reception ==
Professional ratings
Aggregate scores
Source	Rating
Metacritic	69/100
Review scores
Source	Rating
AllMusic	3.5/5 stars
The Daily Telegraph	4/5 stars
Entertainment Weekly	B
The Guardian	3/5 stars
The Independent	3/5 stars
Los Angeles Times	2.5/4 stars
Pitchfork	7.1/10
Rolling Stone	4/5 stars
Spin	7/10
USA Today	3.5/4 stars

Girl on Fire received generally positive reviews from critics. At Metacritic, which assigns a normalized rating out of 100 to reviews from mainstream publications, the album received an average score of 69, based on 25 reviews. In Rolling Stone, Jody Rosen called Keys a musical "iconoclast" and Girl on Fire "both her catchiest and subtlest album yet – and one of the best R&B records of 2012." Uncut wrote in its review, "Her technical brilliance remains stunning; it's now matched by her maturity and modernity." Will Hodgkinson of The Times wrote that the album "works by combining odd modern touches with a classic songwriting sensibility." Helen Brown from The Daily Telegraph felt that, although "the powerful simplicity of her lyrics" occasionally "tends toward the trite", the album "does at least see her classily smouldering and occasionally ablaze." Andrew Hampp of Billboard felt that it is "low on the filler" of some of Keys' previous albums and dubbed it "arguably [her] most consistent album to date." Melissa Maerz of Entertainment Weekly wrote that "the music feels surprisingly intimate" when Keys plays her piano-based songs rather than the "jazzy smoothfests". Robert Christgau said Girl on Fire was "heartfelt, lively, and sweet—as r&b maturity statements go", while naming the title track and "One Thing" as its highlights. He gave it a two-star honorable mention in his column for MSN Music, indicating a "likable effort consumers attuned to its overriding aesthetic or individual vision may well enjoy".

In a mixed review, Ben Ratliff of The New York Times observed "so many clichés" and critiqued that the songs with Keys' personal "subtext ... quickly grow trite, in words and music." Dave Simpson of The Guardian wrote that, "as a reinvention, the album doesn't go far enough, and there are some underwhelming tunes". Simon Price of The Independent found it to be "dominated by navel-gazing auto-therapy sessions" and asserted, "What it lacks, ironically, is fire." Slant Magazine's Eric Henderson found the album to be "less a portrait of Keys's womanhood at a crossroads as it is another extension of a career spent predominantly navigating straight down the middle of the road." Greg Kot of the Chicago Tribune felt that, like her previous albums, Keys still "keeps her guard up and the listener at arm’s length." Kitty Empire of The Observer quipped, "she's supposed to be on fire here, not just warming the piano stool", while Mikael Wood of the Los Angeles Times viewed it as another "collection of handsomely crafted, gorgeously sung ballads interrupted by several overworked anthems about the value of perseverance."

== Accolades ==
Year	Award	Category	Nominee(s)	Result	Ref.
2012	La chanson de l'année	Song of the Year	"Girl on Fire"	Nominated	
2013	NAACP Image Award	Outstanding Music Video	"Girl on Fire"	Won	
2013	NAACP Image Award	Outstanding Album	Girl on Fire	Nominated	
2013	NAACP Image Award	Outstanding Female Artist	Alicia Keys	Won	
2013	International Dance Music Award	Best R&B/Urban Dance Track	"Girl on Fire"	Nominated	
2013	RTHK International Pop Poll Award	Top Ten International Gold Songs	"Girl on Fire"	Won	
2013	RTHK International Pop Poll Award	Top Female Artist	Alicia Keys	Nominated	
2013	Billboard Music Award	Billboard Music Award for Top R&B Artist	Alicia Keys	Nominated	
2013	Billboard Music Award	Top R&B Album	Girl on Fire	Nominated	
2013	Billboard Music Award	Top R&B Song	"Girl on Fire"	Nominated	
2013	MTV Video Music Award Japan	Best Female Video	"Girl on Fire"	Nominated	
2013	MTV Video Music Award Japan	Best R&B Video	"Girl on Fire"	Nominated	
2013	BMI Urban Award	Most Performed Song	"Girl on Fire"	Won	
2013	Soul Train Music Award	Best R&B/Soul Female Artist	Alicia Keys	Nominated	
2013	Soul Train Music Award	The Ashford & Simpson Songwriter's Award	"Fire We Make"	Nominated	
2013	Soul Train Music Award	Best Collaboration	"Fire We Make"	Nominated	
2014	TEC Award	Outstanding Creative Achievement – Record Production/Album	Girl on Fire	Nominated	
2014	Grammy Award	Best R&B Album	Girl on Fire	Won	
2014	NAACP Image Award	Outstanding Song	"Fire We Make"	Nominated	
2014	NAACP Image Award	Outstanding Music Video	"Fire We Make"	Nominated	
2014	NAACP Image Award	Outstanding Duo, Group or Collaboration	"Fire We Make"	Nominated	
2014	ASCAP Rhythm & Soul Award	Award Winning R&B/Hip-Hop Song	"Girl on Fire"	Won	

== Commercial performance ==
In the United States, Girl on Fire debuted at number one the US Billboard 200 chart, selling 159,000 copies in its first week. It became Keys' fifth number-one album on the chart but also registered Keys' lowest first-week sales for an album until her sixth and seventh studio albums, Here (2016) and Alicia (2020). Keys' previous album, The Element of Freedom (2009), had opened to sales of 417,000 units, "buoyed by its week-before Christmas release date". In its second week, Girl on Fire dropped to number seven on the chart, selling an additional 77,000 copies. In its third week, the album fell to number nine, selling 61,000 more copies. On August 11, 2020, the album was certified platinum by the Recording Industry Association of America (RIAA) for combined sales and album-equivalent units of one million units in the United States.

In the United Kingdom, the album debuted at number 15 on the UK Albums Chart and number two on the UK R&B Albums Chart, selling 31,675 copies in its first week. In Australia, it debuted at number 12 on the ARIA Albums Chart and number two on the ARIA Urban Albums Chart. Upon the release of Girl on Fire in South Korea, the entire album charted on the Gaon International Singles Chart: "Tears Always Win" debuted at number one, "Not Even the King" at number 24, "Girl on Fire" (Inferno Version, featuring Nicki Minaj) at number 46, "That When I Knew" and "Brand New Me" at numbers 50 and 51, respectively, "One Thing" at 56, "Fire We Make" (with Maxwell) at number 64, "New Day" at number 66, "Listen to Your Heart" at number 68, "When Its All Over" at number 72, "Limitedless" at number 82, "De Novo Adagio (Intro)" at number 84 and "101" at number 87. According to the International Federation of the Phonographic Industry (IFPI), Girl on Fire was the 32nd best-selling album worldwide of 2012 with sales of 1.3 million copies.

== Track listing ==
Girl on Fire – Standard edition
No.	Title	Writer(s)	Producer(s)	Length
1.	"De Novo Adagio" (Intro)			1:19
2.	"Brand New Me"	Alicia Keys; Emeli Sandé	Keys	3:53
3.	"When It's All Over"	Keys; John Stephens; Stacy Barthe	Keys; Jamie Smith	4:34
4.	"Listen to Your Heart"	Keys; Stephens	Darkchild; Keys	3:46
5.	"New Day"	Keys; Kasseem Dean; Trevor Lawrence, Jr.; Andre Brissett; Sevyn Streeter; Dr. Dre	Dr. Dre; Swizz Beatz	4:02
6.	"Girl on Fire" (Inferno version; featuring Nicki Minaj)	Keys; Jeff Bhasker; Salaam Remi; Onika Tanya Maraj; Billy Squier	Keys; Bhasker; Salaam Remi	4:30
7.	"Fire We Make" (duet with Maxwell)	Keys; Andrew "Pop" Wansel; Warren "Oak" Felder; Gary Clark, Jr.	Keys; Pop & Oak	5:21
8.	"Tears Always Win"	Keys; Bhasker; Bruno Mars; Phillip Lawrence	Bhasker; Keys	3:59
9.	"Not Even the King"	Keys; Sandé	Keys	3:07
10.	"That's When I Knew"	Keys; Kenny Edmonds; Antonio Dixon	Edmonds; Dixon	4:05
11.	"Limitedless"	Keys; Wansel; Felder; Streeter; Barthe	Keys; Pop & Oak	3:57
12.	"One Thing"	Keys; Frank Ocean; James Ho	Ho	4:08
13.	"101"	Keys; Sandé	Keys	6:29
Total length:				53:08

Girl on Fire – Japanese edition (bonus tracks)
No.	Title	Writer(s)	Producer(s)	Length
14.	"Girl on Fire"	Keys; Bhasker; Remi; Squier	Keys; Bhasker; Salaam Remi	3:44
15.	"Girl on Fire" (Bluelight version)	Keys; Bhasker; Remi; Squier	Keys; Bhasker; Salaam Remi	4:22
Total length:				61:14

Girl on Fire – Australian tour edition (bonus DVD–VH1 Storytellers)
No.	Title	Length
1.	"No One"	6:10
2.	"Brand New Me"	4:49
3.	"You Don't Know My Name"	7:00
4.	"Empire State of Mind (Part II) Broken Down"	4:18
5.	"Not Even the King"	4:11
6.	"Fallin'"	4:44
7.	"If I Ain't Got You"	7:17
8.	"Girl on Fire"	4:57
9.	"New Day"	4:48
10.	"Try Sleeping with a Broken Heart"	5:49
11.	"Un-Thinkable (I'm Ready)"	5:40

Sample credits

- "Girl on Fire" contains a sample from the drum track from Billy Squier's 1980 song "The Big Beat".

== Personnel ==
Credits adapted from the liner notes of Girl on Fire.

Musicians

- Alicia Keys – concept, CP-70 piano, keyboards, Moog synthesizer, piano, synthesizers, background vocals, vocals
- Jeff Bhasker – drum programming, keyboards ("Tears Always Win"), organ, piano ("Girl on Fire")
- Andre Brissett – keyboards ("New Day")
- Gary Clark, Jr. – electric guitar ("Fire We Make")
- Antonio Dixon – drum programming ("That's When I Knew")
- Kenneth "Babyface" Edmonds – acoustic guitar, bass guitar ("That's When I Knew")
- Warren "Oak" Felder – drum programming, keyboard programming (tracks 7, 11)
- Emile Haynie – drum programming ("Tears Always Win")
- James "Malay" Ho – acoustic guitar, bass guitar, drum programming, electric guitar ("One Thing")
- Rodney "Darkchild" Jerkins – drum programming, keyboard programming ("Listen To Your Heart")
- Billy Kraven – background vocals ("Tears Always Win")
- Trevor Lawrence Jr. – drum programming ("New Day")
- Bruno Mars – background vocals, bass, guitar ("Tears Always Win")
- Steve Mostyn – bass guitar ("Limitedless")
- Phillip Lawrence – background vocals ("Tears Always Win")
- Salaam Remi – drum programming ("Girl on Fire")
- Lenford "Brutus" Richards – electric guitar ("Limitedless")
- Davide Rossi – string arrangement, strings ("Brand New Me")
- Jamie Smith – drum and synth programming ("When It's All Over")
- Amber "Sevyn" Streeter – background vocals (tracks 5, 11)
- Andrew "Pop" Wansel – drum programming (tracks 7, 11)
- Dylan Wissing – drums ("Girl on Fire")

Additional personnel

- Michelangelo Di Battista – photography
- David S. Blanco – design, layout
- Erwin Gorostiza – creative director
- Simon Henwood – creative director, design, layout, logo design
- Steffan McMillan – design, layout
- Nino Muñoz – photography

Technical personnel

- Alicia Keys – executive producer, producer
- Jeff Bhasker – producer
- Antonio Dixon – producer
- Dr. Dre – producer
- Kenneth "Babyface" Edmonds – producer
- James "Malay" Ho – producer
- Rodney "Darkchild" Jerkins – producer
- Pop & Oak – producer
- Salaam Remi – producer
- Jamie Smith – producer
- Swizz Beatz – producer
- Val Brathwaite – assistant engineer, engineer, project assistant
- Paul Boutin – engineer
- Ghazi Hourani – assistant engineer
- Chad Jolley – vocal engineer
- Ken Lewis – engineer
- Jared Lynch – assistant engineer
- Take Mendez – assistant engineer
- Ann Mincieli – coordination, engineer, mixing
- Paul Norris – assistant engineer
- Ramon Rivas – assistant engineer, engineer, project assistant
- Miki Tsutsumi – assistant engineer
- Emerson Mancini – mastering assistant
- Chris Galland – mixing assistant
- Justin Hergett – mixing assistant
- James Krause – mixing assistant
- Manny Marroquin – mixing
- Tony Maserati – mixing
- Greg Morgan – sound design
- David Kutch – mastering

== Charts ==
=== Weekly charts ===
Chart (2012–2013)	Peak position
Argentine Albums (CAPIF)	7
Australian Albums (ARIA)	12
Australian Urban Albums (ARIA)	2
Austrian Albums (Ö3 Austria)	7
Belgian Albums (Ultratop Flanders)	11
Belgian Albums (Ultratop Wallonia)	16
Canadian Albums (Billboard)	8
Croatian International Albums (HDU)	27
Czech Albums (ČNS IFPI)	16
Danish Albums (Hitlisten)	21
Dutch Albums (Album Top 100)	7
Finnish Albums (Suomen virallinen lista)	19
French Albums (SNEP)	8
German Albums (Offizielle Top 100)	6
Greek Albums (IFPI)	24
Hungarian Albums (MAHASZ)	28
Irish Albums (IRMA)	27
Italian Albums (FIMI)	17
Japanese Albums (Oricon)	13
Mexican Albums (Top 100 Mexico)	86
New Zealand Albums (RMNZ)	22
Norwegian Albums (VG-lista)	13
Polish Albums (ZPAV)	17
Portuguese Albums (AFP)	16
Russian Albums (2M)	23
Scottish Albums (Official Charts)	20
Slovenian Albums (RTV)	19
Spanish Albums (Promusicae)	13
Swedish Albums (Sverigetopplistan)	39
Swiss Albums (Schweizer Hitparade)	3
UK Albums (Official Charts)	13
UK Album Downloads (Official Charts)	6
UK R&B Albums (Official Charts)	2
US Billboard 200	1
US Top R&B/Hip-Hop Albums (Billboard)	1

=== Year-end charts ===
Chart (2012)	Position
Australian Urban Albums (ARIA)	32
Dutch Albums (Album Top 100)	69
French Albums (SNEP)	71
German Albums (Offizielle Top 100)	79
South Korean International Albums (Gaon)	77
Swiss Albums (Schweizer Hitparade)	95
UK Albums (OCC)	71

Chart (2013)	Position
Australian Urban Albums (ARIA)	20
Belgian Albums (Ultratop Flanders)	106
Belgian Albums (Ultratop Wallonia)	126
Dutch Albums (Album Top 100)	94
Swiss Albums (Schweizer Hitparade)	59
US Billboard 200	25
US Top R&B Albums (Billboard)	5
US Top R&B/Hip-Hop Albums (Billboard)	8

== Certifications ==
Region	Certification	Certified units/sales
Australia (ARIA)	Gold	35,000^{^}
Canada (Music Canada)	Gold	40,000^{^}
France (SNEP)	Gold	50,000^{*}
Germany (BVMI)	Gold	100,000^{^}
Netherlands (NVPI)	Platinum	50,000^{^}
New Zealand (RMNZ)	Platinum	15,000^{‡}
Philippines (PARI)	Gold	7,500^{*}
Poland (ZPAV)	Gold	10,000^{*}
Switzerland (IFPI Switzerland)	Gold	15,000^{^}
United Kingdom (BPI)	Gold	100,000^{*}
United States (RIAA)	Platinum	1,000,000^{‡}
^{*} Sales figures based on certification alone.^{^} Shipments figures based on certification alone.^{‡} Sales+streaming figures based on certification alone.

== Release history ==
Release dates and formats for Girl on Fire
Region	Date	Edition(s)	Format(s)	Label(s)	Ref.
Netherlands	November 22, 2012	Standard	CD; digital download	Sony Music	
Australia	November 23, 2012	Standard	CD; digital download	Sony Music	
Germany	November 23, 2012	Standard	CD; digital download	Sony Music	
France	November 26, 2012	Standard	CD; digital download	Jive Epic	
United Kingdom	November 26, 2012	Standard	CD; digital download; vinyl	RCA	
Italy	November 27, 2012	Standard	CD; digital download	Sony Music	
United States	November 27, 2012	Standard	CD; digital download	RCA	
Japan	November 28, 2012	Standard	CD; digital download	Sony Music	
Sweden	November 28, 2012	Standard	CD; digital download	Sony Music	
France	December 14, 2012	Standard	Vinyl	Jive Epic	
Germany	December 14, 2012	Standard	Vinyl	Sony Music	
Netherlands	December 17, 2012	Standard	Vinyl	Sony Music	
Sweden	December 19, 2012	Standard	Vinyl	Sony Music	
United States	December 25, 2012	Standard	Vinyl	RCA	
Australia	November 29, 2013	Tour	CD+DVD	Sony Music	

== See also ==
- List of Billboard 200 number-one albums of 2012
- List of Billboard number-one R&B albums of 2012
