= New Day (Alicia Keys song) =

Single by Alicia Keys

from the album Girl on Fire
- Released: February 21, 2013
- Studio: Jungle City (New York, NY); Oven (New York, NY)
- Genre: R&B; hip hop
- Length: 4:02
- Label: RCA
- Songwriters: Alicia Keys; Kasseem Dean; Trevor Lawrence, Jr.; Andre Young; Andre Brissett; Amber Streeter
- Producers: Swizz Beatz; Dr. Dre

Alicia Keys singles chronology
"Brand New Me" (2012)	"New Day" (2013)	"Fire We Make" (2013)

Music video
- "New Day" on YouTube

"New Day" is a song by American recording artist Alicia Keys from her fifth studio album Girl on Fire (2012). Produced by Swizz Beatz and Dr. Dre, the song showcases a musical departure from the previous singles by the singer, with a more upbeat sound led by drums and percussion, as opposed to her classical R&B sound. On the song, Keys sings about "touching the sky and not letting chances go to waste". It received praise from music critics, who complimented the new musical direction, as well as criticizing the downgrade of Keys' "powerhouse voice" in favor of percussion. Rapper 50 Cent has a version of the song with one verse by Dr. Dre and the hook by Alicia Keys, also called "New Day". It was released as the second international single from the album and was officially sent to French radio stations on February 21, 2013.

== Background ==
On June 28, 2012, Keys officially released "New Day" online, and she previewed the song earlier in the day. During an interview on the 2012 BET Awards, Swizz Beatz commented that Keys was "in [a] whole new creative place, the chorus ‘It's a new day' speaks of everything." Beatz further added that "It's a new day for music. It's a new day for her spiritually, mentally. The concept is celebrating life, and that's just the beginning of it. People are going to see how many parts of that record are going to come alive." He also described her upcoming album Girl on Fire as "timeless", and said that "fans should be on the look out for new pieces any day now." In August 2012, Keys revealed the artwork of Girl on Fire and stated that the album will be released under RCA Records on November 27, 2012. The singer commented via a press release that Girl on Fire "is about finding your voice, about being unleashed and about trusting your instincts and trusting yourself."

== Composition ==
"New Day"
A 14-second sample of "New Day", with Alicia Keys singing the bridge and first verse of the chorus, with heavily processed vocals alongside a percussion background: a change of musical style attributed to her husband and producer of the song, Swizz Beatz.

"New Day" is a contemporary R&B song with house, hip hop, pop and reggae influences, and a duration of four minutes and four seconds, which was produced by Keys' husband Swizz Beatz. The song is structured by "rat-a-tat drums" and a beat that "springs back and forth" alongside some "piano flourishes" that adds "a bit of seriousness" to the song. On a YouTube message, the singer said: "I got something fresh for you, something fresh for the summer. I’m feeling good, and I’m thinking.", moments prior to releasing the song.

On "New Day", Keys sings about "touching the sky and not letting chances go to waste", singing: "There's no limitation, no / Fill up your life / Let me see your hands up." On the theme of the song, Keys expressed that for her, "a new day is the possibility to choose how to create the life of your dreams and letting no one to stop you." Jenna Hally Rubenstein from MTV noted that the song is "clearly inspired" by the experiences and feelings the singer had about her son, Egypt. She further added that "In short, 'New Day' is a strong start to what will hopefully be a banger of an album."

Amy Sciaretto from PopCrush compared the song with Beyoncé's "Run the World (Girls)" (2011), commenting that "it’s all about the beats and the percussion," and further stating that "the drums, as opposed to her voice, drive this song." She also said that "New Day" doesn't "showcase her powerhouse voice like other signature hits on her cataloge", mentioning "Fallin'", "No One" and "Empire State of Mind" as examples. Keenan Higgins from Vibe stated that "New Day" was a "strong step back" for her, but praised its "heavy bass" and "powerful" vocals, as well as the "crazy turntable mix" close to the end of the song, considering that it "proves to be an amazing start" for what she named as "another chart-topper" for the singer.

== Critical reception ==
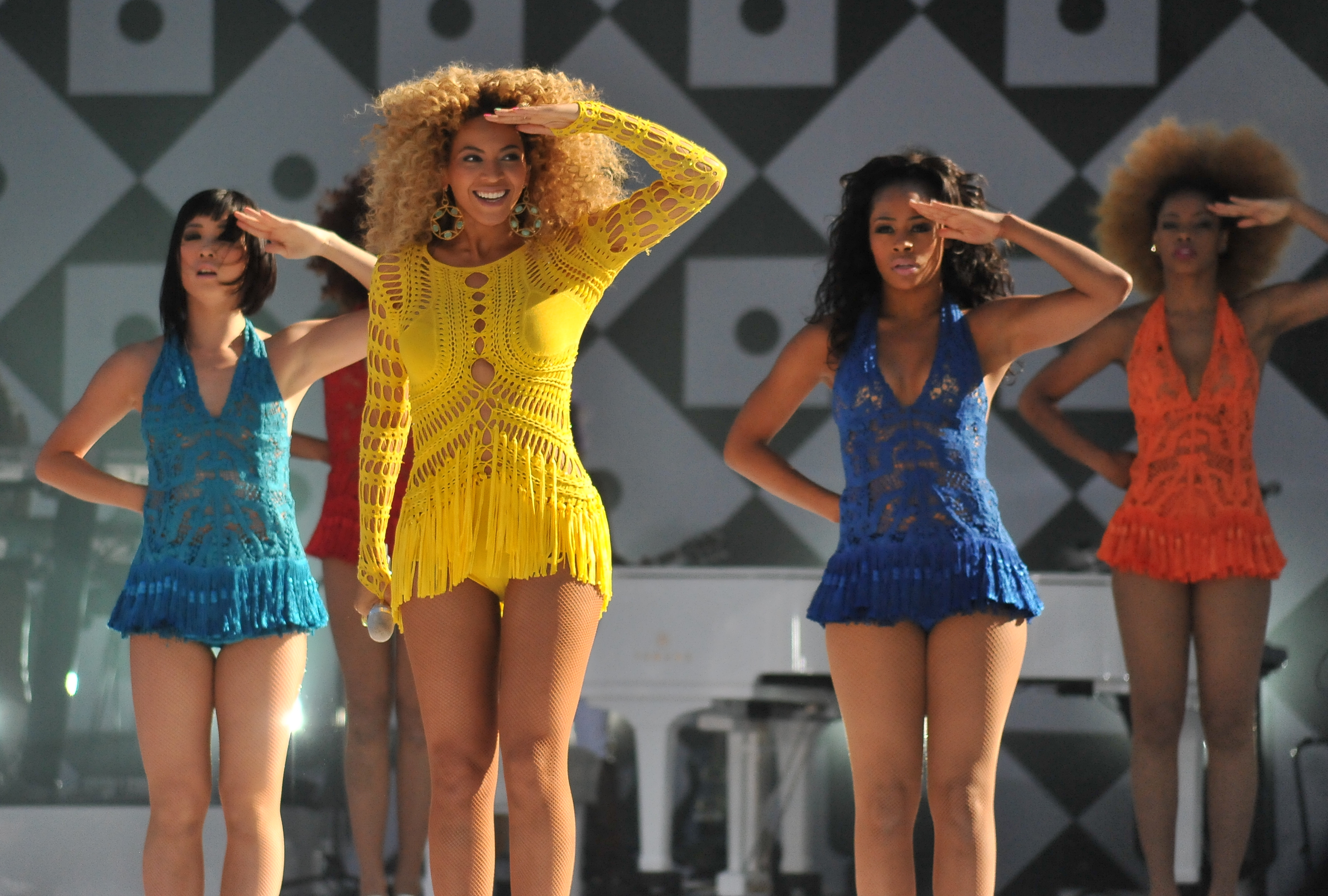
Critics noted similarities between "New Day" and Beyoncé's "Run the World (Girls)".

"New Day" has received positive response from music critics. Jason Lipshutz from Billboard gave a positive review of the song, stating that "If 'New Day' is indeed the lead single to Keys' fifth studio album, the track is her most upbeat lead single yet." Becky Bain from Idolator agreed with Lipshutz, stating that it's "one of the most upbeat songs she’s ever released". Leah Collins from The Province was positive over the song's change in style, commenting that it "definitely marks a new sound for the singer—or at least a new tempo. Driven by a drumline beat—and some house-style piano—the track's more propulsive than Keys' typical torchy R&B."

Amy Sciaretto from PopCrush gave the song a mixed review, stating that "This is a club banger, which is not something we expect from Keys." She further stated that on the song, Keys sounds "harder and tougher", explaining that "It sounds like a rhythmic jam with some vocals tucked underneath." Sciaretto finally concluded that "When you have a gift like Keys, why not use it to its full potential?" Andrew Santana from Entertainment Weekly attributed to Swizz Beatz the musical change that Keys showcased in "New Day", stating that it is "a different sound for the usually more subdued Keys."

Katherine St Asaph from Popdust gave the song three stars out of five, and recognized that "the clear inspiration" behind the "clattering military drums, party-hearty lyrics and brash-and-scattered vocals is traceable to one person", referencing Swizz Beatz as the reason for the musical change. She further stated that "if you like Keys for her ballads and piano work, you definitely won’t like how Beatz minces it all toward the end." Jarett Wieselman from The Insider gave an optimist preview of the song, ensuring that "it's an uptempo jam that's perfect for summertime driving with the windows rolled down and the bass pumped up high."

== Music videos ==
=== Viral video ===
The viral video for the song is composed of a 4-minute series of dozens of images, including many Instagram photographs and short snippets of videos presented in staccato style to the bass beat. Images on the video include people dancing and drumming, parades, same sex weddings, birthday parties, graduations, a wedding anniversary photo session, fireworks, news video of events of the Arab Spring, and military homecomings.

=== Official video ===
The official video was premiered via Keys' official VEVO account on May 1, 2013. It was directed by fashion photographer-turned video director Indrani.

== Charts ==
Chart (2012–13)	Peak position
Belgium (Ultratip Bubbling Under Flanders)	14
Belgium (Ultratip Bubbling Under Wallonia)	3
France (SNEP)	106
Japan (Japan Hot 100)	52
Netherlands (Dutch Top 40 Tipparade)	8
South Korea International Singles (Gaon)	47
US Hot R&B/Hip-Hop Songs (Billboard)	73

== Release history ==
Country	Date	Format
Australia	May 17, 2013	
France	February 21, 2013	Contemporary hit radio
United Kingdom	June 24, 2013	Contemporary hit radio
