= VH1 Storytellers =

- Created by: VH1
- Country of origin: United States

Production
- Running time: 60 minutes

Original release
- Network: VH1
- Release: 1996 – 2015

Storytellers is a television music series produced by the VH1 network.

In each episode, artists perform in front of a (mostly small and intimate) live audience, and tell stories about their music, writing experiences and memories, somewhat similar to MTV Unplugged. The show started in 1996 with a broadcast of Ray Davies, during his "Storyteller" tour, and took its name from this first show.The original idea and title was suggested by a young music lawyer at Sony Music, Jonathan Polk, who suggested to the Kink's manager in 1991, that Davies do a one man show called 'Ray Davies: Storyteller" at New York City's The Bottom Line, where he told the story behind each song. 98 episodes aired before the show's cancellation, and many of the performances have subsequently been released on CD or DVD. "Best of" collections have also been released. In February 2025, many Storytellers episodes became available to stream on Paramount+.

== Performers ==
=== VH1 Storytellers ===
Episode	Name	Date
01	Ray Davies	February 6, 1996
02	Jackson Browne	June 3, 1996
03	Elvis Costello	June 16, 1996
04	Lyle Lovett	June 23, 1996
05	Sting	July 15, 1996
06	The Black Crowes	August 27, 1996
07	Melissa Etheridge	September 13, 1996
08	Garth Brooks	October 20, 1996
09	Bee Gees	November 25, 1996
10	James Taylor	March 26, 1997
11	Phil Collins	April 14, 1997
12	Willie Nelson & Johnny Cash	December 5, 1997
13	John Fogerty	June 6, 1997
14	Counting Crows	December 8, 1997
15	Billy Joel	January 9, 1997
16	Elton John	Sep 19, 1997
17	Paul Simon	Oct 20, 1997
18	Sarah McLachlan with Paula Cole	Jan 29, 1998
19	Shawn Colvin	Mar 27, 1998
20	Rod Stewart	Apr 28, 1998
21	Culture Club	May 2, 1998
22	Bonnie Raitt	December 5, 1998
23	Ringo Starr	May 13, 1998
24	Hanson	June 27, 1998
25	Stevie Nicks	August 18, 1998
26	Sheryl Crow	August 20, 1998
27	Natalie Merchant	September 14, 1998
28	John Mellencamp	January 10, 1998
29	Meat Loaf	May 10, 1998
30	R.E.M.	October 23, 1998
31	Tori Amos	October 24, 1998
32	Tony Bennett and Backstreet Boys	October 25, 1998
33	Dave Matthews Featuring Tim Reynolds	March 24, 1999
34	Tom Petty and The Heartbreakers	March 31, 1999
35	Tom Waits	January 4, 1999
36	Jewel	September 6, 1999
37	The Pretenders	June 25, 1999
38	Alanis Morissette	July 26, 1999
45	Def Leppard	July 26, 1999
46	David Bowie	August 23, 1999
47	Lenny Kravitz	August 22, 1999
48	Wyclef Jean And Friends	July 9, 1999
49	Eurythmics	August 28, 1999
50	Crosby, Stills, Nash & Young	February 18, 2000
51	Steely Dan	January 2, 2000
52	Don Henley	February 19, 2000
53	Pete Townshend	April 26, 2000
54	The Best of Storytellers	2000
55	Stone Temple Pilots	August 3, 2000
56	Bon Jovi	September 22, 2000
57	No Doubt	October 8, 2000
58	Duran Duran	June 25, 2000
59	The Smashing Pumpkins	August 24, 2000
60	A tribute to The Doors	September 26, 2000
61	Matchbox Twenty	January 6, 2001
62	Travis	August 6, 2001
63	Electric Light Orchestra	June 15, 2001
64	Billy Idol	Jun 22, 2001
65	Train & Fuel	July 9, 2001
66	Goo Goo Dolls	February 6, 2002
67	Robert Plant	Jul 14, 2002
68	Green Day	May 6, 2005
69	Bruce Springsteen	Apr 23, 2005
70	Coldplay	August 6, 2005
71	Dave Matthews Band	Sep 13, 2005
72	Pearl Jam	May 31, 2006
73	Dixie Chicks	Oct 28, 2006
74	Jay-Z	August 11, 2007
75	Mary J. Blige	Feb 25, 2008
76	Snoop Dogg	Mar 31, 2008
77	Kid Rock	Nov 27, 2008
78	Kanye West	Feb 28, 2009
79	ZZ Top	Jun 27, 2009
80	Foo Fighters	Nov 27, 2009
81	John Mayer	October 12, 2009
82	Christina Aguilera	May 5, 2010
83	Infant Sorrow	April 6, 2010
84	T.I.	October 12, 2010
85	Kings of Leon	May 13, 2011
86	Cee-Lo Green	May 20, 2011
87	Death Cab for Cutie	May 27, 2011
88	My Morning Jacket	March 6, 2011
89	Ray LaMontagne	October 6, 2011
90	Maxwell	Jun 17, 2011
91	Jill Scott	December 5, 2012
92	Jason Mraz	January 6, 2012
93	Norah Jones	August 6, 2012
94	Grace Potter and the Nocturnals	Jun 15, 2012
95	Taylor Swift	November 11, 2012
96	Alicia Keys	December 11, 2012
97	Pink	Nov 13, 2012
98	Ed Sheeran	Jan 24, 2015

Meat Loaf enjoyed the show so much that he bought the stage decorations from VH1 and went on to do a "Storytellers" tour in 1998/1999.

=== MTV Japan Storytellers ===
Episode	Name	Date
01	Scandal	Oct 21, 2017
